= 2021–22 WRU Championship =

2021–22 Admiral Championship
- Countries: Wales
- Date: 13 November 2021 - 7 May 2022
- Champions: Bargoed
- Matches played: 79 (out of a scheduled 91)

The 2021–22 WRU Championship (or Admiral Championship for sponsorship reasons) was the ninth season of the WRU Championship, the second tier of club rugby in Wales run by the Welsh Rugby Union. The league expanded to a 14 team format, up from 12 in previous seasons. The league was won by Bargoed for the second time; the first being the 2014–15 season.

The season was truncated and not all fixtures fulfilled. Ultimately, this had no bearing on the title as Bargoed could not be mathematically caught.

The large amount of cancelled fixtures caused friction from some clubs within the league, the most vocal being Pontypool, who called for the entire WRU Community Game Board to resign.

== Structure ==
For 2021-22, instead of a traditional league, each team played each other team on a home or away basis for a total of 13 games. League points were awarded as such – 4 points for a win, 2 for a draw and 0 for a loss. Teams could also earn an additional bonus point by scoring four or more tries in a match and/or losing by less than seven points. The club with the most points after 13 games were declared the winners, although not all clubs completed their full 13 matches. As the previous two seasons were disrupted during the COVID-19 pandemic, there was no promotion or relegation this year.

== Teams ==
As the previous seasons (2019–20 & 2020–21) were cancelled due to COVID-19 pandemic, no teams were promoted or relegated from any league. Therefore, the same 14 teams that competed the previous season will compete again this season.

Locations of the 2021–22 WRU Championship teams with colour markers to represent the region they belong to:

Orange = Dragons
Blue = Cardiff Rugby
Black = Ospreys

Red = Scarlets

Club	Stadium	Capacity	Area
Bargoed	Bargoed Park	1,500	Bargoed, Caerphilly
Beddau	Mount Pleasant Park	unknown	Beddau, Rhondda Cynon Taf
Bedwas	Bridge Field	2,000	Bedwas, Caerphilly
Cardiff Metropolitan University	Cyncoed Campus	1,620	Cyncoed, Cardiff
Cross Keys	Pandy Park	3,000	Crosskeys, Caerphilly
Glamorgan Wanderers	Memorial Ground	3,000	Ely, Cardiff
Maesteg Quins	South Parade Playing Fields	unknown	Maesteg, Bridgend County Borough
Narberth	Lewis Lloyd Ground	unknown	Narberth, Pembrokeshire
Neath	The Gnoll	6,000	Neath, Neath Port Talbot
Pontypool	Pontypool Park	8,800	Pontypool, Torfaen
Tata Steel	Tata Sports and Social Club	unknown	Port Talbot, Neath Port Talbot
Trebanos	Trebanos Park	unknown	Trebanos, Neath Port Talbot
Ystalyfera	Ynysdarren Park	unknown	Ystalyfera, Neath Port Talbot
Ystrad Rhondda	Gelligaled Park	unknown	Ystrad, Rhondda Cynon Taf

== Standings ==
2021–22 Admiral National Championship Table
Pos	Team	Pld	W	D	L	PF	PA	PD	TF	TA	TB	LB	Pts
1	Bargoed (C)	13	12	0	1	368	158	+210	51	19	8	0	56
2	Neath	13	11	0	2	382	246	+136	51	26	7	2	53
3	Pontypool	11	9	0	2	441	100	+341	61	11	9	1	46
4	Bedwas	12	9	0	3	290	234	+56	39	29	4	1	41
5	Narberth	12	7	0	5	307	214	+93	37	27	4	3	35
6	Cardiff Metropolitan University	13	7	0	6	355	297	+58	48	42	4	2	34
7	Cross Keys	11	5	0	6	196	224	−28	27	27	2	4	26
8	Maesteg Quins	12	5	0	7	223	265	−42	26	38	2	3	25
9	Ystrad Rhondda	10	4	0	6	136	219	−83	20	29	2	1	19
10	Glamorgan Wanderers	12	4	0	8	212	384	−172	27	55	1	1	18
11	Trebanos	10	3	0	7	150	250	−100	18	36	0	1	13
12	Tata Steel	12	1	0	11	199	433	−234	21	61	2	2	8
13	Ystalyfera	8	1	0	7	126	199	−73	15	26	1	2	7
14	Beddau	9	1	0	8	90	252	−162	12	27	1	0	5

Updated to match(es) played on 7 May 2022. Source: "Admiral National Championship". allwalessport.
Rules for classification: If teams are level at any stage, tiebreakers are applied in the following order:
1. Number of matches won
2. Number of tries scored
3. Ratio between points for:points against
  (C) Champion
