= 2019–20 WRU Championship =

2019–20 WRU National Championship
- Countries: Wales
- Date: 7 September 2019 – 14 March 2020 (cancelled)
- Champions: NONE
- Relegated: NONE
- Matches played: 115 (out of a scheduled 182)

The 2019–20 WRU Championship was the eighth season of the WRU Championship, the second tier of club rugby in Wales run by the Welsh Rugby Union. The league expanded to 14 teams from 12 seasons for the previous three seasons.

The season was cancelled on 20 March 2020 due to the COVID-19 pandemic in the United Kingdom.

== Structure ==
Each team in the Championship will play each other twice on a home and away basis for a total of 26 matches played each. The team with the most points at the end of the season will be declared the winners. The winning club will be promoted to the 2020-21 WRU Premiership, provided they meet the "A" License criteria. At the end of the season, the bottom four clubs will be relegated.

== Teams ==
At the end of last season, Bedlinog, Newcastle Emlyn, Newbridge and Rhydyfelin were all relegated to Division 1 (specific league based on geographic location). The winners of each Division 1 entered into play-offs to decide the remaining two places. The winners of the two Eastern divisions faced each other as did the winners of the two Western divisions. The winners were East Central champions Glamorgan Wanderers and West Central champions Ystalyfera who beat Brecon and Felinfoel respectively. Joining these teams are the four clubs relegated from last season's Premiership. These clubs are Bedwas, Cross Keys, Bargoed and Neath.

== Promotion play-offs ==
11 May 2018
14:30

Brecon	28 – 23	Glamorgan Wanderers

Parc de Pugh

7 May 2018
19:00

Ystalyfera	34 – 28	Felinfoel

Ynysydarren Park

18 May 2018
14:30

Glamorgan Wanderers	34 – 12	Brecon

Ely Memorial Ground

Glamorgan Wanderers won 57–40 on aggregate.

12 May 2018
15:00

Felinfoel	20 – 30	Ystalyfera

St George Field

Ystalyfera won 64–48 on aggregate.

Locations of the 2019–20 WRU Championship teams with colour markers to represent the region they belong to:

Orange = Dragons
Blue = Cardiff Blues
Black = Ospreys

Red = Scarlets

Club	Stadium	Capacity	Area
Bargoed	Bargoed Park	1,500	Bargoed, Caerphilly
Beddau	Mount Pleasant Park	unknown	Beddau, Rhondda Cynon Taf
Bedwas	Bridge Field	2,000	Bedwas, Caerphilly
Cardiff Metropolitan University	Cyncoed Campus	1,620	Cyncoed, Cardiff
Cross Keys	Pandy Park	3,000	Crosskeys, Caerphilly
Glamorgan Wanderers	Memorial Ground	3,000	Ely, Cardiff
Maesteg Quins	South Parade Playing Fields	unknown	Maesteg, Bridgend County Borough
Narberth	Lewis Lloyd Ground	unknown	Narberth, Pembrokeshire
Neath	The Gnoll	6,000	Neath, Neath Port Talbot
Pontypool	Pontypool Park	8,800	Pontypool, Torfaen
Tata Steel	Tata Sports and Social Club	unknown	Port Talbot, Neath Port Talbot
Trebanos	Trebanos Park	unknown	Trebanos, Neath Port Talbot
Ystalyfera	Ynysdarren Park	unknown	Ystalyfera, Neath Port Talbot
Ystrad Rhondda	Gelligaled Park	unknown	Ystrad, Rhondda Cynon Taf

== Standings ==
2019–20 WRU Championship Table
Pos	Team	Pld	W	D	L	PF	PA	PD	TF	TA	TB	LB	Pts
1	Pontypool	16	16	0	0	746	136	+610	112	18	14	0	78
2	Bargoed	16	14	1	1	663	148	+515	96	16	14	1	73
3	Bedwas	17	13	0	4	477	236	+241	65	29	10	3	65
4	Cardiff Metropolitan University	18	13	1	4	528	393	+135	75	56	9	0	63
5	Neath	17	8	0	9	344	413	−69	44	55	5	4	41
6	Narberth	16	8	1	7	339	335	+4	40	47	4	1	39
7	Cross Keys	17	8	0	9	316	395	−79	39	51	3	3	38
8	Glamorgan Wanderers	16	8	0	8	233	340	−107	24	43	1	2	35
9	Maesteg Quins	16	8	0	8	235	370	−135	25	44	2	0	34
10	Ystrad Rhondda	16	6	0	10	270	350	−80	31	41	3	4	31
11	Beddau	16	4	0	12	220	505	−285	29	75	2	1	19
12	Trebanos	16	2	2	12	175	336	−161	21	45	0	6	18
13	Tata Steel	16	2	1	13	232	521	−289	29	68	1	4	15
14	Ystalyfera	17	2	0	15	204	504	−300	23	65	0	5	13

Updated to match(es) played on unknown. Source: "WRU Championship". allwalessport.
Rules for classification: If teams are level at any stage, tiebreakers are applied in the following order:
1. Number of matches won
2. Number of tries scored
3. Ratio between points for:points against
