= 2022–23 WRU Championship =

Rugby union competition

2022–23 Admiral Championship
- Countries: Wales
- Date: 3 September 2022 - 20 May 2023
- Promoted: Pontypool
- Matches played: 160 (including 3 walkovers)

The 2022–23 WRU Championship (or Admiral Championship for sponsorship reasons) was the tenth season of the WRU Championship, the second tier of club rugby in Wales run by the Welsh Rugby Union. It was contested by 14 Welsh clubs.

== Structure ==
The structure reverted to its traditional league format following truncation the previous season. Each team played each other team on a home and away basis for a total of 26 games. League points were awarded as follows – 4 points for a win, 2 for a draw and 0 for a loss. Teams could also earn an additional bonus point by scoring four or more tries in a match and/or losing by less than seven points. As the Premiership will expand to 14 teams for the 2023–24 season, the top two clubs will be promoted - providing they meet the WRU A Licence criteria. No teams were relegated.

== Teams ==
The same 14 teams from the 2021–22 season competed this term. Bargoed were the reigning champions.

Locations of the 2022–23 Admiral Championship teams with colour markers to represent the region they belong to:

Orange = Dragons
Blue = Cardiff Rugby
Black = Ospreys

Red = Scarlets

| Club | Stadium | Capacity | Area |
|---|---|---|---|
| Bargoed | Bargoed Park | 1,500 | Bargoed, Caerphilly |
| Beddau | Mount Pleasant Park | unknown | Beddau, Rhondda Cynon Taf |
| Bedwas | Bridge Field | 2,000 | Bedwas, Caerphilly |
| Cardiff Metropolitan University | Cyncoed Campus | 1,620 | Cyncoed, Cardiff |
| Cross Keys | Pandy Park | 3,000 | Crosskeys, Caerphilly |
| Glamorgan Wanderers | Memorial Ground | 3,000 | Ely, Cardiff |
| Maesteg Quins | South Parade Playing Fields | unknown | Maesteg, Bridgend County Borough |
| Narberth | Lewis Lloyd Ground | unknown | Narberth, Pembrokeshire |
| Neath | The Gnoll | 6,000 | Neath, Neath Port Talbot |
| Pontypool | Pontypool Park | 8,800 | Pontypool, Torfaen |
| Tata Steel | Tata Sports and Social Club | unknown | Port Talbot, Neath Port Talbot |
| Trebanos | Trebanos Park | unknown | Trebanos, Neath Port Talbot |
| Ystalyfera | Ynysdarren Park | unknown | Ystalyfera, Neath Port Talbot |
| Ystrad Rhondda | Gelligaled Park | unknown | Ystrad, Rhondda Cynon Taf |

== Standings ==
2022–23 Admiral Championship Table
| Pos | Team | Pld | W | D | L | PF | PA | PD | TF | TA | TB | LB | Pts |
|---|---|---|---|---|---|---|---|---|---|---|---|---|---|
| 1 | Pontypool (P) | 22 | 22 | 0 | 0 | 1073 | 232 | +841 | 161 | 26 | 21 | 0 | 109 |
| 2 | Neath | 22 | 19 | 0 | 3 | 851 | 316 | +535 | 128 | 37 | 20 | 3 | 99 |
| 3 | Bargoed | 24 | 20 | 0 | 4 | 809 | 378 | +431 | 121 | 50 | 17 | 1 | 98 |
| 4 | Ystrad Rhondda | 21 | 15 | 1 | 5 | 642 | 348 | +294 | 94 | 44 | 11 | 3 | 76 |
| 5 | Cardiff Metropolitan University | 25 | 14 | 0 | 11 | 746 | 699 | +47 | 105 | 102 | 13 | 1 | 70 |
| 6 | Bedwas | 24 | 12 | 0 | 12 | 595 | 609 | −14 | 81 | 90 | 12 | 3 | 63 |
| 7 | Narberth | 22 | 12 | 0 | 10 | 610 | 455 | +155 | 82 | 63 | 10 | 5 | 63 |
| 8 | Cross Keys | 23 | 11 | 0 | 12 | 647 | 616 | +31 | 94 | 84 | 14 | 4 | 62 |
| 9 | Beddau | 21 | 10 | 0 | 11 | 496 | 492 | +4 | 71 | 67 | 8 | 0 | 48 |
| 10 | Glamorgan Wanderers | 22 | 7 | 0 | 15 | 473 | 753 | −280 | 66 | 106 | 10 | 2 | 40 |
| 11 | Maesteg Quins | 24 | 7 | 1 | 16 | 368 | 755 | −387 | 41 | 111 | 4 | 1 | 35 |
| 12 | Trebanos | 23 | 5 | 0 | 18 | 347 | 670 | −323 | 48 | 100 | 3 | 4 | 27 |
| 13 | Ystalyfera | 23 | 5 | 0 | 18 | 352 | 739 | −387 | 52 | 107 | 4 | 1 | 25 |
| 14 | Tata Steel | 24 | 0 | 0 | 24 | 263 | 1210 | −947 | 32 | 189 | 1 | 0 | −3 (Note: Tata Steel were deducted 4 points for failing to fulfil a fixture.) |

Updated to match(es) played on 6 May 2023. Source: "Admiral Championship". allwalessport.
Rules for classification: If teams are level at any stage, tiebreakers are applied in the following order:
1. Number of matches won
2. Number of tries scored
3. Ratio between points for:points against
  (P) Promoted
  Notes:
