= 2018–19 WRU Championship =

2018–19 WRU National Championship
- Countries: Wales
- Date: 1 September 2018 – 10 May 2019
- Champions: Pontypool (3rd title)
- Relegated: Bedlinog; Newcastle Emlyn; Newbridge; Rhydyfelin
- Matches played: 132

The 2018–19 WRU Championship was the seventh season of the WRU Championship, the second tier of club rugby in Wales run by the Welsh Rugby Union. It was the third season to feature 12 teams, reduced from 14 in previous seasons. For this season, "ring-fencing" was abolished and the winner would play-off against the 12th placed team in the 2018–19 Principality Premiership at a neutral venue to determine the 12th team for the 2019–20 season. The competition was won by Pontypool for the third consecutive year and completed the season unbeaten for the second year running. The bottom four clubs relegated were Bedlinog, Newbridge (both to 1 East), Newcastle Emlyn (to 1 West) and Rhydyfelin (to 1 East Central).

== Structure ==
Each team in the Championship will play each other twice on a home and away basis for a total of 22 matches played each. The team with the most points at the end of the season will be declared the winners. Provided that the champion club holds an 'A-License', they will play-off against the 12th placed team in the 2018-19 Principality Premiership at a neutral venue to determine the 12th team for the 2019–20 season. The bottom four clubs at the end of the season will be relegated to Division 1 (based on geographical location).

== Teams ==
At the end of last season, Skewen and Glynneath were both relegated to Division 1 West Central. The winners of each Division 1 entered into playoffs to decide the remaining two places. The winners of the two Eastern divisions faced each other as did the winners of the two Western divisions. The winners were East Central champions Ystrad Rhondda and West Central champions Maesteg Quins who beat Brynmawr and Felinfoel respectively. Both clubs were making their debuts in the competition.

== Promotion play-offs ==
12 May 2018
14:30

Ystrad Rhondda	47 – 31	Brynmawr

Gelligaled Park

22 May 2018
18:45

Maesteg Quins	28 – 27	Felinfoel

South Parade Playing Fields

16 May 2018
19:15

Brynmawr	5 – 28	Ystrad Rhondda

Recreation Ground

Ystrad Rhondda won 75–36 on aggregate.

25 May 2018
18:45

Felinfoel	6 – 25	Maesteg Quins

St George Field

Maesteg Quins won 53–33 on aggregate.

Locations of the 2018–19 WRU Championship teams with colour markers to represent the region they belong to:

Orange = Dragons
Blue = Cardiff Blues
Black = Ospreys

Red = Scarlets

Club	Stadium	Capacity	Area
Beddau	Mount Pleasant Park	unknown	Beddau, Rhondda Cynon Taf
Bedlinog	Recreation Ground	unknown	Bedlinog, Merthyr Tydfil
Cardiff Metropolitan University	Cyncoed Campus	1,620	Cyncoed, Cardiff
Maesteg Quins	South Parade Playing Fields	unknown	Maesteg, Bridgend County Borough
Narberth	Lewis Lloyd Ground	unknown	Narberth, Pembrokeshire
Newbridge	Welfare Ground	5,000	Newbridge, Caerphilly
Newcastle Emlyn	Dôl Wiber	unknown	Newcastle Emlyn, Carmarthenshire
Pontypool	Pontypool Park	8,800	Pontypool, Torfaen
Rhydyfelin	Recreation Ground	unknown	Rhydyfelin, Rhondda Cynon Taf
Tata Steel	Tata Sports and Social Club	unknown	Port Talbot, Neath Port Talbot
Trebanos	Trebanos Park	unknown	Trebanos, Neath Port Talbot
Ystrad Rhondda	Gelligaled Park	unknown	Ystrad, Rhondda Cynon Taf

== Standings ==
2018–19 WRU National Championship Table
Pos	Team	Pld	W	D	L	PF	PA	PD	TF	TA	TB	LB	Pts
1	Pontypool (C)	22	22	0	0	759	336	+423	118	43	18	0	106
2	Ystrad Rhondda	22	16	0	6	533	454	+79	70	58	11	1	76
3	Narberth	22	16	0	6	501	377	+124	61	45	6	3	73
4	Cardiff Metropolitan University	22	13	1	8	559	416	+143	72	56	8	4	66
5	Tata Steel	22	9	0	13	573	570	+3	80	74	11	5	52
6	Trebanos	22	10	0	12	437	446	−9	56	59	4	7	51
7	Maesteg Quins	22	11	0	11	405	479	−74	38	63	2	3	49
8	Beddau	22	8	0	14	426	516	−90	53	70	3	8	43
9	Bedlinog (R)	22	7	1	14	401	502	−101	48	57	5	7	42
10	Newcastle Emlyn (R)	22	7	0	15	422	599	−177	53	88	6	5	39
11	Newbridge (R)	22	6	1	15	385	518	−133	51	67	3	7	36
12	Rhydyfelin (R)	22	5	1	16	340	528	−188	50	70	4	5	31

Updated to match(es) played on unknown. Source: "WRU Championship". allwalessport.
Rules for classification: If teams are level at any stage, tiebreakers are applied in the following order:
1. Number of matches won
2. Number of tries scored
3. Ratio between points for:points against
  (C) Champion; (R) Relegated
