= 2016–17 WRU Championship =

2016–17 WRU National Championship
- Countries: Wales
- Date: 3 September 2016 – 29 April 2017
- Champions: Pontypool (1st title)
- Relegated: Glamorgan Wanderers; Dunvant
- Matches played: 132

The 2016–17 WRU Championship was the fifth season of the WRU Championship, the second tier of club rugby in Wales run by the Welsh Rugby Union. It is the first season to feature 12 teams, reduced from 14 in previous seasons. The next two seasons will be "ring-fenced" with the champion club not being promoted due to changes in the 2016–17 Principality Premiership. The competition was won by Pontypool. The bottom two clubs that were relegated were Glamorgan Wanderers (to 1 East Central) and Dunvant (to 1 West).

== Structure ==
Each team in the Championship will play each other twice on a home and away basis for a total of 22 matches played each. The team with the most points at the end of the season will be declared the winners. The winning club will not be promoted due to "ring-fencing" of the Premiership. The bottom two clubs at the end of the season will be relegated to Division 1 (based on geographical location).

== Teams ==
Last year's champions Merthyr were promoted alongside Swansea, Bargoed and RGC 1404 into the newly formatted 2016–17 Principality Premiership. Bridgend Athletic and Llanharan were relegated into Division 1 West Central and 1 East Central respectively. Unlike previous years, all 4 Division 1 champion clubs were promoted to the Championship. These were Bedlinog, Glamorgan Wanderers, Skewen and Dunvant.

Locations of the 2016–17 WRU Championship teams with colour markers to represent the region they belong to:

Orange = Newport Gwent Dragons
Blue = Cardiff Blues
Black = Ospreys

Red = Scarlets

Club	Stadium	Capacity	Area
Beddau	Mount Pleasant Park	unknown	Beddau, Rhondda Cynon Taf
Bedlinog	Recreation Ground	unknown	Bedlinog, Merthyr Tydfil
Cardiff Metropolitan University	Cyncoed Campus	1,620	Cyncoed, Cardiff
Dunvant	Broadacre	unknown	Dunvant, Swansea
Glamorgan Wanderers	Memorial Ground	3,000	Ely, Cardiff
Glynneath	Abernant Park	unknown	Glynneath, Neath Port Talbot
Narberth	Lewis Lloyd Ground	unknown	Narberth, Pembrokeshire
Newbridge	Welfare Ground	5,000	Newbridge, Caerphilly
Newcastle Emlyn	Dôl Wiber	unknown	Newcastle Emlyn, Carmarthenshire
Pontypool	Pontypool Park	8,800	Pontypool, Torfaen
Skewen	Tennant Park	unknown	Skewen, Neath Port Talbot
Tata Steel	Tata Sports and Social Club	unknown	Port Talbot, Neath Port Talbot

== Standings ==
2016–17 WRU Championship Table
Pos	Team	Pld	W	D	L	PF	PA	PD	TF	TA	TB	LB	Pts
1	Pontypool (C)	22	21	0	1	803	279	+524	114	31	14	0	98
2	Narberth	22	17	0	5	647	362	+285	88	47	11	2	81
3	Tata Steel	22	14	0	8	578	451	+127	82	58	12	2	70
4	Beddau	22	14	0	8	535	398	+137	70	47	10	4	70
5	Newcastle Emlyn	22	10	1	11	411	502	−91	51	64	7	5	54
6	Cardiff Metropolitan University	22	10	0	12	435	562	−127	53	74	4	2	46
7	Newbridge	22	9	0	13	403	532	−129	55	68	7	2	45
8	Glynneath	22	10	0	12	340	488	−148	37	67	2	2	44
9	Bedlinog	22	8	1	13	407	440	−33	52	49	3	7	44
10	Skewen	22	8	1	13	314	418	−104	34	56	0	7	41
11	Glamorgan Wanderers (R)	22	7	1	14	405	490	−85	47	62	4	7	41
12	Dunvant (R)	22	2	0	20	434	790	−356	50	110	3	5	16

Updated to match(es) played on unknown. Source: "WRU Championship". allwalessport.
Rules for classification: If teams are level at any stage, tiebreakers are applied in the following order:
1. Number of matches won
2. Number of tries scored
3. Total number of points for
4. Difference between points for and against
  (C) Champion; (R) Relegated
