= 2017–18 WRU Championship =

Rugby championship season

2017–18 WRU National Championship
- Countries: Wales
- Date: 2 September 2017 – 10 May 2018
- Champions: Pontypool (2nd title)
- Relegated: Skewen; Glynneath
- Matches played: 132

The 2017–18 WRU Championship was the sixth season of the WRU Championship, the second tier of club rugby in Wales run by the Welsh Rugby Union. It is the second season to feature 12 teams, reduced from 14 in previous seasons. This season is the second to be "ring-fenced" with the champion club not being promoted due to changes in the Principality Premiership. The competition was won again by Pontypool who completed the feat of going a whole season unbeaten, winning all 22 games. The bottom two clubs that were relegated were Skewen and Glynneath (both to 1 West Cenrtral).

== Structure ==
Each team in the Championship will play each other twice on a home and away basis for a total of 22 matches played each. The team with the most points at the end of the season will be declared the winners. The winning club will not be promoted due to "ring-fencing" of the Premiership. The bottom two clubs at the end of the season will be relegated to Division 1 (based on geographical location).

== Teams ==
At the end of last season, Glamorgan Wanderers and Dunvant were relegated to Division 1 East Central and West Central respectively. This season saw the return of playoffs between the Division 1 East and East Central champions and Division 1 West and West Central champions to determine which clubs will participate in this year's Championship. The promoted clubs were East champions Rhydyfelin and West Central champions Trebanos. Both clubs beat Treorchy and Kidwelly respectively. Both clubs were making their debuts in the competition.

== Promotion play-offs ==
6 May 2017
14:30

Rhydyfelin	42 – 24	Treorchy

Recreation Ground

18 May 2017
19:15

Trebanos	25 – 18	Kidwelly

Trebanos Park

13 May 2017
14:30

Treorchy	13 – 10	Rhydyfelin

The Oval

Rhydyfelin won 52–37 on aggregate.

25 May 2017
19:15

Kidwelly	5 – 31	Trebanos

Parc Stephens

Trebanos won 56–23 on aggregate.

Locations of the 2017–18 WRU Championship teams with colour markers to represent the region they belong to:

Orange = Dragons
Blue = Cardiff Blues
Black = Ospreys

Red = Scarlets

Club	Stadium	Capacity	Area
Beddau	Mount Pleasant Park	unknown	Beddau, Rhondda Cynon Taf
Bedlinog	Recreation Ground	unknown	Bedlinog, Merthyr Tydfil
Cardiff Metropolitan University	Cyncoed Campus	1,620	Cyncoed, Cardiff
Glynneath	Abernant Park	unknown	Glynneath, Neath Port Talbot
Narberth	Lewis Lloyd Ground	unknown	Narberth, Pembrokeshire
Newbridge	Welfare Ground	5,000	Newbridge, Caerphilly
Newcastle Emlyn	Dôl Wiber	unknown	Newcastle Emlyn, Carmarthenshire
Pontypool	Pontypool Park	8,800	Pontypool, Torfaen
Rhydyfelin	Recreation Ground	unknown	Rhydyfelin, Rhondda Cynon Taf
Skewen	Tennant Park	unknown	Skewen, Neath Port Talbot
Tata Steel	Tata Sports and Social Club	unknown	Port Talbot, Neath Port Talbot
Trebanos	Trebanos Park	unknown	Trebanos, Neath Port Talbot

== Standings ==
2017–18 WRU National Championship Table
Pos	Team	Pld	W	D	L	PF	PA	PD	TF	TA	TB	LB	Pts
1	Pontypool (C)	22	22	0	0	926	239	+687	139	30	19	0	107
2	Narberth	22	14	1	7	595	439	+156	79	60	11	3	72
3	Trebanos	22	14	0	8	501	335	+166	69	43	9	4	69
4	Tata Steel	22	13	0	9	546	483	+63	77	63	10	4	66
5	Newbridge	22	12	0	10	455	462	−7	62	61	7	3	58
6	Bedlinog	22	10	2	10	480	501	−21	59	66	9	5	58
7	Rhydyfelin	22	10	0	12	391	435	−44	52	59	4	5	49
8	Newcastle Emlyn	22	9	1	12	470	633	−163	59	84	6	3	47
9	Beddau	22	8	0	14	379	543	−164	49	73	5	6	43
10	Cardiff Metropolitan University	22	7	2	13	473	638	−165	60	92	5	3	40
11	Skewen (R)	22	7	0	15	352	535	−183	43	70	2	4	34
12	Glynneath (R)	22	3	0	19	292	617	−325	39	86	2	3	17

Updated to match(es) played on unknown. Source: "WRU Championship". allwalessport.
Rules for classification: If teams are level at any stage, tiebreakers are applied in the following order:
1. Number of matches won
2. Number of tries scored
3. Total number of points for
4. Difference between points for and against
  (C) Champion; (R) Relegated
