= Welsh Championship =

Rugby union club league in Wales

WRU Admiral Championship
- Founded: 2012
- Country: Wales
- Number of clubs: East - 13; West - 13
- Level on pyramid: 2
- Promotion to: WRU Admiral Premiership
- Relegation to: WRU League One (WRU Division One North / WRU Division One East / WRU Division One East Central / WRU Division One West Central / WRU Division One West)
- Domestic cup: WRU Championship Cup
- Current champions: 2024–25; East Beddau RFC; West Llanelli Wanderers RFC
- Most championships: 5 - Pontypool (1st Title in 2016-17)
- Broadcaster(s): BBC Wales, S4C, BBC Sport
- Website: WRU National Championship
- Current: 2024–25 WRU Championship

The WRU National Championship (or Admiral Championship for sponsorship reasons) is the third tier of professional rugby union in Wales. The league was reformed by the Welsh Rugby Union (WRU) in 2012.

== History ==
In 2012, the new division was formed from the restructuring of the Welsh Premier Division. The Premier Division was 'slimmed down' to 12 teams with Pontypool RFC and Tonmawr RFC relegated from the division. Tonmawr had already made the decision to opt out of the new league and would start the 2012–13 season in Division Six.

The National Championship is the third tier, which lies below the second tier Welsh Premier Division in Welsh club rugby. Above Welsh club rugby sides are the four regions, the Scarlets, Ospreys, Cardiff Blues, and Dragons, as part of regional rugby, who instead compete in the United Rugby Championship.

=== Restructuring process ===
The teams for the league would be decided on three factors. Firstly, the holding of an 'A Licence' based on stadium criteria. The signing of a 'Participation Agreement' and judged on league results over the previous six seasons. It was originally decided that the Premiership would reduce in size to ten teams. It was announced that four clubs, Pontypool, Tonmwar, Bridgend Ravens and Carmarthen Quins RFC had not achieved the required criteria to be included into the new league. However, pressure from Ospreys and Scarlets backers led to the league being extended to 12 teams with Bridgend and Carmarthen included. Tonmawr, citing financial reasons, opted not to take part in the new league at all and re-entered themselves into Division Six.

=== 2012 Pontypool legal challenge ===
The new league came under scrutiny in 2012 when Pontypool RFC launched a legal challenge to avoid being the only club relegated to the new division, which they ultimately lost on the grounds of 'meritocracy'. Pontypool had finished 12th in the previous campaign, above rivals Bedwas RFC and level on points with historic rivals Newport RFC.

== 2025–26 season ==
=== Clubs and locations ===
Colour markers to represent the region each club belongs to:
Blue = Cardiff Rugby || Orange = Dragons || Black = Ospreys || Red = Scarlets

Championship East
Club	Stadium	Capacity	Area	Previous season
Aberdare RFC	Ynys Stadium	500	Aberdare	7th Championship East
Abertillery RFC	Abertillery Park	15,250	Abertillery	1st League 1 East (Promoted)
Bedwas RFC	The Bridge Field	2,000	Bedwas	2nd Championship East
Bridgend Athletic RFC	Newbridge Fields		Bridgend	1st League 1 West Central (Promoted)
Mountain Ash RFC	Parc Duffryn Pennar		Mountain Ash	9th Championship East
Penallta RFC	Ystrad Fawr	200	Ystrad Mynach	5th Championship East
Rumney RFC	Riverside Park	250	Rumney	3rd Championship East
St. Joseph's RFC	Maes Y Coed Road		Heath, Cardiff	1st League 1 East Central (Promoted)
St Peters RFC	Harlequins Playing Fields		Roath, Cardiff	8th Championship East
Talywain RFC	Emlyn Park		Pontypool	6th Championship East
Treorchy RFC	The Oval		Treorchy	10th Championship East
The Wanderers	Memorial Ground	3,000	Ely, Cardiff	4th Championship East
Ynysddu RFC	The Welfare Ground		Ynysddu	11th Championship East

Championship West
Club	Stadium	Capacity	Area	Previous season
Aberystwyth RFC	Plascrug		Aberystwyth	1st League 1 West (Promoted)
Ammanford RFC	Manor Road		Ammanford	5th Championship West
Bonymaen RFC	Parc Mawr		Bonymaen, Swansea	12th Admiral Premiership (Relegated)
Crymych RFC	Parc Lloyd Thomas		Crymych	9th Championship West
Dunvant RFC	Broadacre		Dunvant, Swansea	4th Championship West
Glynneath RFC	Abernant Park		Glynneath	6th Championship West
Gorseinon RFC	Welfare Ground	1,200	Gorseinon, Swansea	10th Championship West
Gowerton RFC	Athletic Ground	3,000	Gowerton, Swansea	11th Championship West
Kenfig Hill RFC	Croft Goch Playing Fields		Kenfig Hill	7th Championship West
Newcastle Emlyn RFC	Dôl Wiber		Newcastle Emlyn	13th Admiral Premiership (Relegated)
Tata Steel RFC	Margam Sports Ground		Port Talbot	2nd Championship West
Tondu RFC	Pandy Park		Tondu	3rd Championship West
Trebanos RFC	The Park		Trebanos	8th Championship West

== 2024–25 season ==
Colour markers to represent the region each club belongs to:
Blue = Cardiff Rugby || Orange = Dragons || Black = Ospreys || Red = Scarlets

Championship East
TEAM	PL	W	D	L	PF	PA	DIFF	TF	TA	TB	LB	PTS
Beddau RFC	24	23	0	1	979	336	643	145	45	20	0	112
Bedwas RFC	24	21	0	3	1110	385	725	163	47	22	2	108
Rumney RFC	24	15	1	8	684	626	58	91	83	13	4	79
Glamorgan Wanderers RFC	24	14	1	9	771	587	184	110	78	15	6	79
Penallta RFC	24	14	1	9	745	571	174	106	75	14	5	77
Talywain RFC	24	12	1	11	586	699	-113	77	100	10	2	62
Aberdare RFC	24	12	0	12	589	637	-48	82	86	11	3	62
St. Peter's RFC	24	8	0	16	683	815	-132	96	113	12	6	50
Mountain Ash RFC	24	8	1	15	547	796	-249	75	117	10	3	47
Treorchy RFC	24	6	0	18	566	803	-237	74	117	10	7	41
Ynysddu RFC	24	7	0	17	452	941	-489	62	136	9	2	39
Brynmawr RFC	24	7	1	16	369	571	-202	42	80	3	5	38
Cambrian Welfare RFC	24	6	0	18	451	765	-314	58	104	6	6	36

Championship West
TEAM	PL	W	D	L	PF	PA	DIFF	TF	TA	TB	LB	PTS
Llanelli Wanderers RFC	24	22	0	2	890	401	489	114	48	16	1	105
Tata Steel RFC	24	19	1	4	761	495	266	110	60	16	2	96
Tondu RFC	24	18	0	6	753	414	339	103	54	12	2	86
Dunvant RFC	24	14	0	10	744	682	62	109	92	17	2	77
Ammanford RFC	24	14	0	10	829	525	304	122	73	14	6	76
Glynneath RFC	24	15	0	9	630	520	110	86	69	11	4	75
Kenfig Hill RFC	24	12	2	10	617	523	94	81	60	10	4	66
Trebanos RFC	24	12	1	11	631	644	-13	85	83	9	4	63
Crymych RFC	24	7	0	17	564	885	-321	81	130	12	4	44
Gorseinon RFC	24	8	1	15	499	646	-147	58	89	6	3	43
Gowerton RFC	24	6	1	17	561	722	-161	71	104	8	7	41
Ystalyfera RFC	24	6	0	18	532	737	-205	72	103	10	5	39
Maesteg Harlequins RFC	24	0	0	24	358	1175	-817	47	174	2	3	5

== 2023–24 season ==
Due to the creation of Super Rygbi Cymru, the Welsh Premiership underwent a reconstruction. The top five clubs from both Championships were promoted at the end of the 2023–24 season to join the three clubs not granted access to the Super Rygbi Cymru.

Championship East
TEAM	PL	W	D	L	PF	PA	DIFF	TF	TA	TB	LB	PTS
Bargoed RFC	22	20	0	2	898	374	524	131	49	19	0	99
Cardiff Met RFC	22	16	0	2	787	488	299	112	64	13	4	81
Cross Keys RFC	22	15	1	6	655	552	103	90	73	12	1	75
Ystrad Rhondda	22	15	0	7	659	547	112	100	72	14	3	75
Newbridge RFC	22	14	0	8	675	507	168	97	65	12	3	71
Beddau RFC	22	12	0	10	558	510	48	72	169	9	6	63
Bedwas RFC	22	12	0	10	550	612	-62	70	82	9	3	60
Rumney RFC	22	9	0	13	569	612	-43	73	81	9	8	53
The Wanderers	22	8	1	13	491	575	-84	61	85	5	6	45
St Peter's RFC	22	4	0	18	504	700	-196	73	101	10	11	37
Penallta RFC	22	5	0	17	523	745	-222	70	107	7	3	28
Treorchy RFC	22	1	0	21	305	952	-647	42	143	3	4	9

Championship West
TEAM	PL	W	D	L	PF	PA	DIFF	TF	TA	TB	LB	PTS
Narberth RFC	22	21	0	1	954	304	650	139	41	17	1	102
Brecon RFC	22	20	0	2	791	401	390	114	51	17	1	98
Llangennech RFC	22	17	0	5	862	422	440	131	57	19	2	89
Bonymaen RFC	22	14	0	8	573	435	138	86	55	14	5	75
Newcastle Emlyn RFC	22	11	0	11	521	567	-46	70	75	7	3	54
Dunvant RFC	22	10	0	12	504	583	-79	69	81	8	4	52
Trebanos RFC	22	11	0	11	450	595	-145	49	83	5	2	51
Crymych RFC	22	9	0	13	539	597	-58	70	82	9	6	51
Ammanford RFC	22	7	0	15	483	680	-197	64	95	5	5	38
Ystalyfera RFC	22	6	1	15	432	745	-313	63	104	7	3	36
Maesteg Harlequins	22	5	1	16	408	767	-359	45	107	4	3	29
Tata Steel RFC	22	0	0	22	363	784	-421	47	116	3	5	8

== 2022–23 season ==
POS	TEAM	PL	W	D	L	PF	PA	DIFF	TF	TA	TB	LB	PTS
1	Pontypool RFC (C)	26	26	0	0	1286	292	994	193	34	25	0	129
2	Neath RFC	26	23	0	3	973	342	631	147	41	24	3	119
3	Bargoed RFC	26	22	0	4	883	399	484	133	53	19	1	108
4	Ystrad Rhondda	25	17	1	7	739	428	311	109	56	14	4	88
5	Narberth RFC	26	15	0	11	734	518	216	102	72	13	5	74
6	Cardiff Met RFC	26	14	0	12	770	765	5	108	112	13	1	70
7	Bedwas RFC	26	13	0	13	673	657	16	94	96	14	3	65
8	Cross Keys RFC	26	11	0	15	700	723	-23	101	100	14	4	62
9	Beddau RFC	25	11	0	14	514	571	-57	74	80	9	4	57
10	Maesteg Harlequins	26	9	1	16	447	793	-346	50	116	5	1	44
11	The Wanderers	26	8	0	18	526	870	-344	76	124	11	2	41
12	Trebanos RFC	26	6	0	20	404	751	-347	55	115	4	4	24
13	Ystalyfera RFC	26	5	0	21	390	899	-509	58	129	4	1	21
14	Tata Steel RFC	26	0	0	26	266	1297	-1031	32	204	1	0	-3

== 2021–22 season ==
POS	TEAM	PL	W	D	L	PF	PA	DIFF	TF	TA	TB	LB	PTS
1	Bargoed RFC (C)	13	12	0	1	368	158	210	51	19	8	0	56
2	Neath RFC	13	11	0	2	382	246	136	52	27	7	2	53
3	Pontypool RFC	11	9	0	2	441	100	341	61	11	9	1	46
4	Bedwas RFC	12	9	0	3	290	234	56	38	29	4	1	41
5	Narberth RFC	12	7	0	5	307	214	93	36	27	4	3	35
6	Cardiff Met RFC	13	7	0	6	355	297	58	48	42	4	2	34
7	Cross Keys RFC	11	5	0	6	196	224	-28	25	28	2	4	26
8	Maesteg Harlequins	12	5	0	7	226	265	-39	26	36	2	3	25
9	Ystrad Rhondda RFC	10	4	0	6	136	219	-83	20	29	2	1	19
10	The Wanderers	12	4	0	8	212	384	-172	29	55	1	1	18
11	Trebanos RFC	10	3	0	7	150	253	-103	18	35	0	1	13
12	Tata Steel RFC	12	1	0	11	199	433	-234	25	61	2	2	8
13	Ystalyfera RFC	8	1	0	7	126	199	-73	14	25	1	2	7
14	Beddau RFC	9	1	0	8	90	252	-162	12	31	1	0	5

== 2020–21 season ==
Cancelled due to COVID-19

== 2019–20 season ==
POS	TEAM	PL	W	D	L	PF	PA	DIFF	TF	TA	TB	LB	PTS
1	Pontypool RFC	16	16	0	0	746	136	610	112	18	14	0	78
2	Bargoed RFC	16	14	1	1	663	148	515	96	16	14	1	73
3	Bedwas RFC	17	13	0	4	478	236	242	65	29	10	3	65
4	Cardiff Met RFC	18	13	1	4	528	393	135	75	56	9	0	63
5	Neath RFC	17	8	0	9	344	413	-69	44	55	5	4	41
6	Narberth RFC	16	8	1	7	339	335	4	41	47	4	1	39
7	Cross Keys RFC	17	8	0	9	316	395	-79	39	52	3	3	38
8	The Wanderers	16	8	0	8	233	340	-107	24	43	1	2	35
9	Maesteg Harlequins	16	8	0	8	235	370	-135	25	44	2	0	34
10	Ystrad Rhondda RFC	16	6	0	10	270	350	-80	31	41	3	4	31
11	Beddau RFC	16	4	0	12	220	506	-286	29	75	2	1	19
12	Trebanos RFC	16	2	2	12	175	336	-161	21	45	0	6	18
13	Tata Steel RFC	16	2	1	13	232	521	-289	29	68	1	4	15
14	Ystalyfera RFC	17	2	0	15	204	504	-300	23	65	0	5	13

== 2018–19 season ==
POS	TEAM	PL	W	D	L	PF	PA	DIFF	PTS
1	Pontypool RFC (C)	15	15	0	0	529	203	326	73
2	Ystrad Rhondda RFC	18	14	0	4	449	362	87	65
3	Narberth RFC	17	14	0	3	389	260	129	63
4	Cardiff Met RFC	19	12	1	6	475	328	147	59
5	Bedlinog RFC	16	6	1	9	276	350	-74	33
6	Maesteg Harlequins RFC	13	7	0	6	234	289	-55	29
7	Trebanos RFC	15	5	0	10	288	330	-42	29
8	Newbridge RFC	18	5	1	12	308	436	-128	28
9	Tata Steel RFC (R)	14	4	0	10	349	378	-29	26
10	Beddau RFC (R)	17	4	0	13	320	422	-102	26
11	Rhydyfelin RFC (R)	15	4	1	10	235	337	-102	24
12	Newcastle Emlyn RFC (R)	15	4	0	11	273	430	-157	21

Correct as of 26 February 2019

== 2017–18 season ==
POS	TEAM	PL	W	D	L	PF	PA	DIFF	PTS
1	Pontypool RFC (C)	22	22	0	0	926	239	687	107
2	Narberth RFC	22	14	1	7	595	439	156	72
3	Trebanos RFC	22	14	0	8	501	335	166	69
4	Tata Steel RFC	22	13	0	9	546	483	63	66
5	Newbridge RFC	22	12	0	10	460	461	-1	58
6	Bedlinog RFC	22	10	2	10	480	501	-21	58
7	Rhydyfelin RFC	22	10	0	12	391	435	-44	49
8	Newcastle Emlyn RFC	22	9	1	12	470	633	-163	47
9	Beddau RFC	22	8	0	14	379	543	-164	43
10	Cardiff Met RFC	22	7	2	13	473	638	-165	40
11	Skewen RFC (R)	22	7	0	15	351	535	-184	34
12	Glynneath RFC (R)	22	3	0	19	292	622	-330	17

(R) - denotes relegation to the WRU Division One East or WRU Division One West

== 2016–17 season ==
POS	TEAM	PL	W	D	L	PF	PA	DIFF	PTS
1	Pontypool RFC (C)	22	21	0	1	805	279	526	98
2	Narberth RFC	22	17	0	5	649	362	287	81
3	Tata Steel RFC	22	14	0	8	578	451	127	70
4	Beddau RFC	22	14	0	8	535	397	138	70
5	Newcastle Emlyn RFC	22	10	1	11	411	504	-93	54
6	Cardiff Met RFC	22	10	0	12	435	562	-127	46
7	Newbridge RFC	22	9	0	13	403	534	-131	45
8	Glynneath RFC	22	10	0	12	339	488	-149	44
9	Bedlinog RFC	22	8	1	13	407	440	-33	44
10	Skewen RFC	22	8	1	13	314	418	-104	41
11	The Wanderers (R)	22	7	1	14	405	490	-85	41
12	Dunvant RFC (R)	22	2	0	20	434	790	-356	16

== 2015–16 season ==
POS	TEAM	PL	W	D	L	PF	PA	DIFF	PTS
1	Merthyr RFC (C)	26	24	0	2	1192	289	903	118
2	Swansea RFC (P)	26	22	1	3	859	402	457	108
3	Bargoed RFC (P)	26	19	1	6	779	401	378	97
4	RGC 1404 RFC (P)	26	19	0	7	928	460	468	96
5	Pontypool RFC	26	19	1	6	794	428	366	94
6	Beddau RFC	26	10	1	15	537	567	-30	52
7	Cardiff Met RFC	26	9	0	17	631	828	-197	51
8	Tata Steel RFC	26	11	0	15	622	787	-165	50
9	Narberth RFC	26	8	1	17	564	710	-146	48
10	Newcastle Emlyn RFC	26	10	0	16	538	668	-130	47
11	Newbridge RFC	26	9	0	17	501	686	-185	47
12	Glynneath RFC	26	9	0	17	461	767	-306	45
13	Bridgend Athletic RFC (R)	26	9	1	16	362	648	-286	43
14	Llanharan RFC (R)	26	1	0	25	277	1404	-1127	7

== 2014–15 season ==
POS	TEAM	PL	W	D	L	PF	PA	DIFF	PTS
1	Bargoed RFC (C)	26	25	0	1	958	362	596	124
2	Swansea RFC	26	22	0	4	909	386	523	107
3	Merthyr RFC	26	19	0	7	671	452	219	89
4	RGC 1404 RFC	26	15	0	11	848	436	412	83
5	Pontypool RFC	26	16	0	10	639	483	156	77
6	Narberth RFC	26	15	1	10	542	562	-20	70
7	Cardiff Met RFC	26	14	0	12	648	533	115	66
8	Bridgend Athletic RFC	26	14	0	12	496	465	31	65
9	Tata Steel RFC	26	12	0	14	486	651	-165	58
10	Glynneath RFC	26	9	0	17	532	653	-121	43
11	Newbridge RFC	26	7	1	18	479	777	-298	39
12	Llanharan RFC	26	6	0	20	475	663	-188	33
13	Tondu RFC	26	4	0	22	461	717	-256	30
14	Blackwood RFC	26	3	0	23	368	1372	-1004	20

== 2013–14 season ==
POS	TEAM	PL	W	D	L	PF	PA	DIFF	PTS
1	Ebbw Vale (C)	26	25	0	1	1009	221	788	122
2	Cardiff Met RFC	26	17	1	8	716	487	229	86
3	RGC 1404 RFC	26	17	0	9	743	419	324	83
4	Pontypool RFC	26	17	1	8	644	463	181	83
5	Narberth RFC	26	16	2	8	656	469	187	80
6	Bargoed RFC	26	15	0	11	562	435	127	74
7	Tata Steel RFC	26	13	0	13	559	561	-2	65
8	Bridgend Athletic RFC	26	13	1	12	478	557	-79	60
9	Tondu RFC	26	11	0	15	431	637	-206	53
10	Llanharan RFC	26	10	0	16	471	676	-205	48
11	Blackwood RFC	26	6	1	19	505	773	-268	39
12	Newbridge RFC	26	7	1	18	349	610	-261	38
13	Beddau RFC	26	5	2	19	378	734	-356	30
14	Bonymaen RFC	26	5	1	20	294	753	-459	27

== 2012–13 season ==
POS	TEAM	PL	W	D	L	PF	PA	DIFF	PTS
1	Ebbw Vale (C)	26	25	0	1	1132	280	852	123
2	Bargoed RFC	26	20	1	5	715	400	315	98
3	Cardiff Met RFC	26	17	1	8	619	468	151	84
4	Tata Steel RFC	26	17	1	8	737	496	241	83
5	Newbridge RFC	26	15	1	10	573	551	22	71
6	Narberth RFC	26	14	0	12	608	625	-17	69
7	Llanharan RFC	26	12	0	14	539	645	-106	65
8	Blackwood RFC	26	12	0	14	562	688	-126	61
9	Bridgend Athletic RFC	26	12	0	14	548	662	-114	60
10	Beddau RFC	26	10	1	15	536	523	13	57
11	Bonymaen RFC	26	9	0	17	399	593	-194	47
12	Pontypool RFC	26	7	0	19	411	714	-303	36
13	The Wanderers	26	4	2	20	437	807	-370	29
14	Whitland RFC	26	4	1	21	388	752	-364	27

== Winners ==
Season	Winners
2012–13	Ebbw Vale RFC
2013–14	Ebbw Vale RFC
2014–15	Bargoed RFC
2015–16	Merthyr RFC
2016–17	Pontypool RFC
2017–18	Pontypool RFC
2018–19	Pontypool RFC
2019–20	Pontypool RFC
2020–21	COVID-19
2021–22	Bargoed RFC
2022–23	Pontypool RFC

=== Split into Championship West and East ===
Season	West Winners	East Winners
2023–24	Narberth RFC	Bargoed RFC
2024–25	Llanelli Wanderers RFC	Beddau RFC
2025–26		
2026–27		
2027–28		
