= Mid District Cup =

Welsh rugby union competition

The Mid District Cup, presently called the Worthington Mid District Cup for sponsorship reasons, is an annual rugby union competition that is contested between clubs in South Wales. The competition is a knock-out format and teams from the Welsh Premier Division are not eligible to participate. Organised by the Mid District Rugby Union, the competition is available to any team that is affiliated to the body.

== Mid District Cup finals ==
Year	Winners	Losing Finalists	Score	Venue
2004	Beddau RFC
2005	Beddau RFC
2006	Beddau RFC
2007	Beddau RFC	Merthyr RFC	18-12
2008	Beddau RFC	Ystrad Rhondda RFC	14-13
2009	Bargoed RFC	Caerphilly RFC	29-26	Rugby Park, Beddau
2010	Mountain Ash RFC	Merthyr RFC	21-16	Virginia Park, Caerphilly
2011	Merthyr RFC	Gilfach Goch RFC	21-15	Graig Park, Penygraig
2012	Treorchy RFC	Bargoed RFC	31-15	Sardis Road, Pontypridd
2013	Beddau RFC	Bargoed RFC	31-20	Sardis Road, Pontypridd
2014	Bargoed RFC	Ystrad Rhondda RFC	29-28
2015	Bargoed RFC	Merthyr RFC	39-20	Sardis Road, Pontypridd
