= Josh Tyler =

- Born: Josh Tyler; 17 December 1990 (age 35) Wales
- Height: 207 cm (6 ft 9 in)
- Weight: 114 kg (17 st 13 lb)

Rugby union career
- Position: Lock
Senior career
Years	Team	Apps	(Points)
2012–2013	NG Dragons	5	(0)
- Correct as of 14:01, 16 September 2012 (UTC)

Josh Tyler (born 17 December 1990) is a Welsh rugby union player. A lock forward, he played for UWIC RFC before making his debut for the Welsh regional team Newport Gwent Dragons on 27 January 2012 versus the Ospreys. He was released by Newport Gwent Dragons at the end of the 2012–13 season.
