= 2016–17 Principality Premiership =

- Countries: Wales
- Date: 2 September 2016 – 21 May 2017
- Champions: Merthyr (1st title)
- Runners-up: Aberavon
- Relegated: none
- Matches played: 182

The 2016–17 Principality Premiership was the first season of the new format of the Principality Premiership, the top tier of club rugby in Wales run by the Welsh Rugby Union. It was contested by sixteen Welsh clubs following an expansion from twelve teams. The next two seasons will be "ring-fenced" and will have no relegation until the 2018–19 season. The competition was won by Merthyr in their first season in the Premiership. The second-tier competition was won by Newport who won their first silverware since the 2003–04 Premiership season.

== Structure ==
The Principality Premiership's structure includes all the teams playing each other once, either home or away, before the table is split into a top 8 and bottom 8 after 15 rounds and points are reset to zero. Each team then plays each other team once, again either home or away, in their respective tier. After all fixtures have been played, a play-off system is implemented for the top 4 teams in each section to determine the winner. The play-off winner of the top 8 will be crowned 2016–17 Principality Premiership champions. This is the first season in which the "ring-fenced" system will be implemented, meaning no team is in danger of relegation until the 2018–19 season.

== Teams ==
After a two-season absence spent in the WRU Championship, Swansea returned to the Premiership finishing as runners-up in the 2015–16 WRU Championship. Also promoted to the Premiership, for the first time, were Championship winners Merthyr, Bargoed and RGC 1404, who narrowly finished above Pontypool to deny them a return to the Premiership after demotion in 2012.

Locations of the 2016–17 Principality Premiership teams with colour markers to represent the region they belong to:

Orange = Newport Gwent Dragons
Blue = Cardiff Blues
Black = Ospreys
Red = Scarlets

- RGC acts as a de facto club representing North Wales

Club	Stadium	Capacity	Area
Aberavon	Talbot Athletic Ground	3,000	Port Talbot, Neath Port Talbot
Bargoed	Bargoed Park	1,500	Bargoed, Caerphilly
Bedwas	Bridge Field	2,000	Bedwas, Caerphilly
Bridgend	Brewery Field	8,000	Bridgend
Cardiff	Cardiff Arms Park	12,125	Cardiff
Carmarthen Quins	Carmarthen Park	3,000	Carmarthen, Carmarthenshire
Cross Keys	Pandy Park	3,000	Crosskeys, Caerphilly
Ebbw Vale	Eugene Cross Park	8,000	Ebbw Vale, Blaenau Gwent
Llandovery	Church Bank Playing Fields	3,000	Llandovery, Carmarthenshire
Llanelli	Parc y Scarlets	14,870	Llanelli, Carmarthenshire
Merthyr	The Wern	4,500	Merthyr Tydfil
Neath	The Gnoll	6,000	Neath, Neath Port Talbot
Newport	Rodney Parade	11,676	Newport
Pontypridd	Sardis Road	7,861	Pontypridd, Rhondda Cynon Taf
RGC 1404	Eirias Stadium	6,000	Colwyn Bay, Conwy
Swansea	St Helen's	4,500	Swansea

== Standings (Phase One) ==
2016–17 Principality Premiership Table
Pos	Team	Pld	W	D	L	PF	PA	PD	TF	TA	TB	LB	Pts
1	Aberavon	15	11	1	3	475	277	+198	67	32	7	2	55
2	Bedwas	15	10	1	4	377	269	+108	47	34	6	4	52
3	Merthyr	15	10	0	5	442	323	+119	58	36	9	2	51
4	RGC 1404	15	10	1	4	431	281	+150	52	32	5	1	48
5	Pontypridd	15	10	0	5	389	373	+16	50	43	6	1	47
6	Carmarthen Quins	15	9	1	5	384	305	+79	42	39	5	4	47
7	Llandovery	15	8	1	6	416	287	+129	49	34	5	4	43
8	Ebbw Vale	15	9	0	6	354	311	+43	41	34	4	2	42
9	Cardiff	15	7	0	8	325	314	+11	36	38	2	7	37
10	Newport	15	7	0	8	291	339	−48	34	41	3	2	33
11	Llanelli	15	6	1	8	291	367	−76	35	48	4	2	32
12	Cross Keys	15	7	0	8	298	301	−3	36	35	2	1	31
13	Bridgend	15	4	0	11	232	332	−100	21	42	2	4	22
14	Neath	15	4	0	11	254	464	−210	29	57	0	3	19
15	Bargoed	15	3	0	12	196	393	−197	26	44	1	3	16
16	Swansea	15	2	0	13	239	458	−219	29	63	0	5	13

Updated to match(es) played on 4 December 2016. Source: "Principality Premiership". allwalessport.
Rules for classification: If teams are level at any stage, tiebreakers are applied in the following order:
1. Number of matches won
2. Number of tries scored
3. Total number of points for
4. Difference between points for and against
After 15 rounds, the table is split into two groups (top 8 and bottom 8)

== Phase Two ==
After 15 rounds, the table is split into a top 8 and bottom 8 and points are reset to zero. Each team now plays each other team once, either home or away, in their respective tiers to total 22 games over the entire season. After these 7 rounds, a play-off system is implemented for the top 4 teams of each tier respectively. The winners of the play-offs for Tier One are crowned 2016–17 Principality Premiership champions.

== Standings (Tier One) ==
Pos	Team	Pld	W	D	L	PF	PA	PD	TF	TA	TB	LB	Pts
1	Merthyr (C)	7	6	0	1	255	132	+123	32	17	5	1	30
2	Aberavon (F)	7	5	0	2	174	140	+34	23	17	4	0	24
3	Bedwas (S)	7	5	0	2	168	146	+22	18	17	2	0	22
4	RGC 1404 (S)	7	4	0	3	176	162	+14	22	17	3	1	20
5	Pontypridd	7	3	0	4	165	170	−5	21	21	2	1	15
6	Llandovery	7	3	0	4	156	240	−84	19	34	1	1	14
7	Ebbw Vale	7	2	0	5	142	160	−18	18	14	2	4	14
8	Carmarthen Quins	7	0	0	7	128	214	−86	15	31	0	2	2

Updated to match(es) played on 7 May 2017. Source: "Principality Premiership Tier 1". allwalessport.
Rules for classification: If teams are level at any stage, tiebreakers are applied in the following order:
1. Number of matches won
2. Number of tries scored
3. Total number of points for
4. Difference between points for and against
  (C) Champion; (F) Final; (S) Semifinals

== Fixtures (Tier One) ==
=== Semi-finals ===
13 May 2017
14:30

Merthyr	35–7	RGC 1404

The Wern

14 May 2017
15:30

Aberavon	31–24	Bedwas

Talbot Athletic Ground

=== Final ===
21 May 2017
15:30

Aberavon	18–22	Merthyr

Talbot Athletic Ground

== Standings (Tier Two) ==
Pos	Team	Pld	W	D	L	PF	PA	PD	TF	TA	TB	LB	Pts
1	Newport (C)	7	5	0	2	141	107	+34	18	13	2	1	23
2	Neath (F)	7	4	1	2	207	141	+66	25	17	4	1	23
3	Cross Keys (S)	7	5	0	2	126	133	−7	15	16	2	0	22
4	Llanelli (S)	7	4	0	3	172	122	+50	23	13	3	2	21
5	Bridgend	7	4	0	3	159	135	+24	19	18	3	1	20
6	Cardiff	7	2	0	5	161	160	+1	18	21	2	3	13
7	Bargoed	7	2	0	5	124	208	−84	18	27	3	1	12
8	Swansea	7	1	1	5	104	188	−84	13	24	2	1	9

Updated to match(es) played on 7 May 2017. Source: "Principality Premiership Tier 2". allwalessport.
Rules for classification: If teams are level at any stage, tiebreakers are applied in the following order:
1. Number of matches won
2. Number of tries scored
3. Total number of points for
4. Difference between points for and against
  (C) Champion; (F) Final; (S) Semifinals

== Fixtures (Tier Two) ==
=== Semi-finals ===
13 May 2017
14:30

Newport	22–17	Llanelli

Rodney Parade

14 May 2017
14:30

Neath	33–13	Cross Keys

The Gnoll

=== Final ===
20 May 2017
19:30

Neath	14–32	Newport

The Gnoll
