= Justin Tipuric =

Wales rugby union footballer

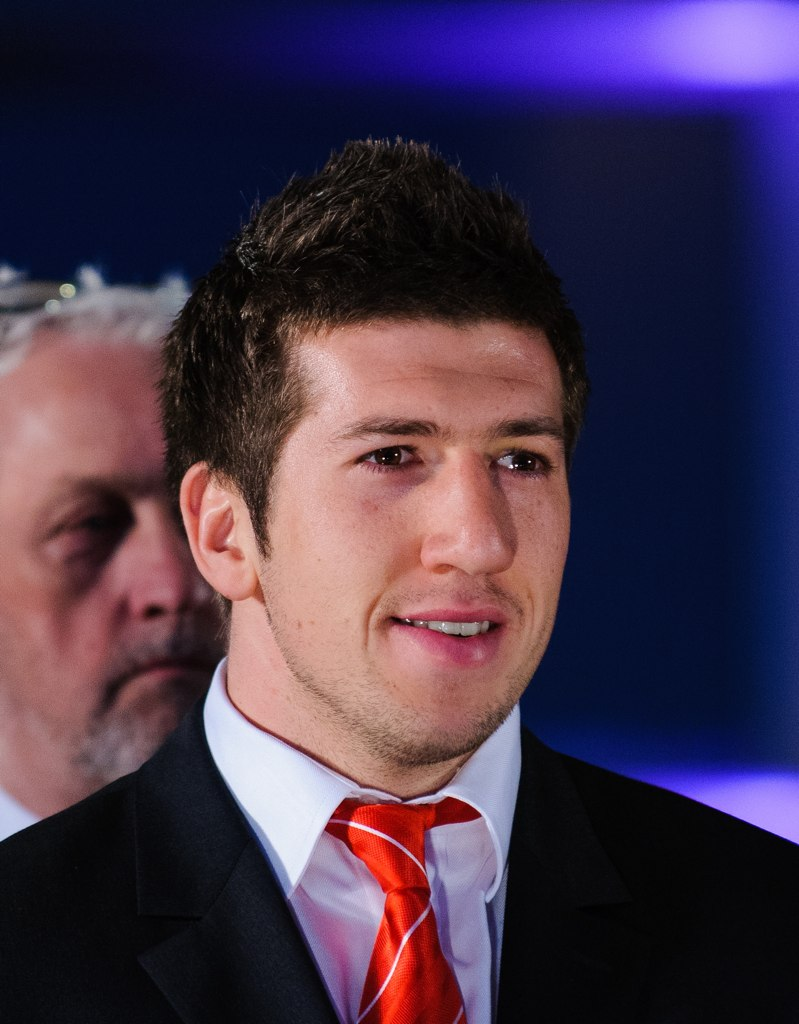
- Tipuric in 2012
- Born: Justin Tipuric; 6 August 1989 (age 37) Alltwen, Neath Port Talbot, Wales
- Height: 188 cm (6 ft 2 in)
- Weight: 102 kg (16 st 1 lb; 225 lb)
- School: Cwmtawe Community School

Rugby union career
- Position: Openside Flanker
Youth career
- Trebanos RFC
Senior career
Years	Team	Apps	(Points)
2007–2011	Aberavon RFC	32	(20)
2009–2025	Ospreys	229	(145)
International career
Years	Team	Apps	(Points)
2008–2009	Wales U20	15	(35)
2011–2023	Wales	93	(55)
2013, 2017, 2021	British & Irish Lions	12	(0)
- Correct as of 18 March 2023

Justin Tipuric (/ˈtɪpərɪk/ TIP-ə-rik; born 6 August 1989) is a Welsh former international rugby union player who played for Wales as an openside flanker. He has formerly been the captain at Ospreys. He joined the Ospreys coaching staff in 2025.

== Early life ==
Although Tipuric grew up in Trebanos, he was born in the village of Alltwen and is of Croatian descent. Tipuric's father was a keen rugby player and captain of Trebanos RFC. Justin and his younger brothers all played for this club and, on his mother's insistence, Tipuric was required to wear a Scrum cap from a young age. As such, he has worn a distinctive blue cap (the traditional Trebanos colours) throughout his career.

== Club career ==
Tipuric plays for the Ospreys Welsh regional team, having previously played for Aberavon RFC. His Ospreys debut came as a replacement in an LV= Cup home defeat to Northampton Saints on 5 November 2009, and he has now played more than 200 times for his home region, including starting in the 2012 Magners League title win over Leinster in Dublin in May, 2012. He was made Ospreys captain from the 2018/19 season.

== International career ==
In June 2011 he was named in the Wales national rugby union team 45-man training squad for the 2011 Rugby World Cup, but was ultimately left out of the final squad. He made his Wales international debut on 20 August 2011 versus Argentina as a second-half replacement. He was also included in the Wales Rugby Sevens in 10/11.

After his efforts for the Welsh side in the 2013 Six Nations Championship, he was selected by Warren Gatland for the 2013 British & Irish Lions tour to Australia.

In August 2015 Tipuric named to the Welsh national rugby union team 47-man training squad for 2015 Rugby World Cup, and started in the home & away warm-up fixtures against Ireland, scoring tries in both fixtures (the first was nominated for World Rugby Try of the Year) and being named man of the match in the second game. Tipuric was named to the final 31-man squad, and despite his fantastic form entering the tournament, he was dropped from the starting XV in favour of returning captain Sam Warburton. He did however feature in all 5 of Wales' games scoring a try in the win 54–9 against Uruguay, his third successive international with a try.

After being named in the squad for the 2016 Six Nations Championship, Tipuric went on to feature in all 5 games, starting alongside longtime rival Sam Warburton against Ireland & Scotland. In the final game against Italy, Tipuric sustained a heavy concussion during a line out which resulted in Tipuric requiring a three-month break from the sport to recover, ruling him out of the summer tour to New Zealand. Following his return from injury Tipuric was included Robert Howley's squad for the 2016 end-of-year rugby union internationals, going onto start in 3 fixtures including a man of the match try scoring performance versus South Africa.

Tipuric was named in the squad for the 2017 Six Nations Championship, and started in the first fixture versus Italy.

Tipuric announced his retirement from International Rugby on 20 May 2023. He will continue to play for the Ospreys.

=== International tries ===
Try	Opponent	Location	Venue	Competition	Date	Result
1	Ireland	Cardiff, Wales	Millennium Stadium	2015 Rugby World Cup warm-up matches	8 August 2015	Loss
2	Ireland	Dublin, Ireland	Lansdowne Road	2015 Rugby World Cup warm-up matches	29 August 2015	Win
3	Uruguay	Cardiff, Wales	Millennium Stadium	2015 Rugby World Cup	20 September 2015	Win
4	South Africa	Cardiff, Wales	Millennium Stadium	2016 Autumn Internationals	26 November 2016	Win
5	Italy	Cardiff, Wales	Millennium Stadium	2018 Six Nations	11 March 2018	Win
6	Georgia	Toyota, Japan	Toyota Stadium	2019 Rugby World Cup	23 September 2019	Win
7	Ireland	Dublin, Ireland	Lansdowne Road	2020 Six Nations	8 February 2020	Loss
8	England	London, England	Twickenham	2020 Six Nations	7 March 2020	Loss
9	England	London, England	Twickenham	2020 Six Nations	7 March 2020	Loss
10	Italy	Llanelli, Wales	Parc y Scarlets	Autumn Nations Cup	5 December 2020	Win
11	New Zealand	Cardiff, Wales	Millennium Stadium	2022 Autumn Internationals	5 November 2022	Loss
