= Justin Thomas (rugby union) =

Wales international rugby union player (born 1973)

- Born: William Justin Lloyd Thomas; 1 November 1973 (age 53) Carmarthen, Wales
- Height: 5 ft 10 in (1.78 m)
- Weight: 78 kg (12 st 4 lb)
- School: Queen Elizabeth Grammar School, Carmarthen
- University: University of Wales Institute, Cardiff

Rugby union career
- Position: Fullback
Amateur team(s)
Years	Team	Apps	(Points)
- Carmarthen Athletic RFC
–	UWIC RFC		
Senior career
Years	Team	Apps	(Points)
1996-1999	Cardiff RFC	76	(166)
1999-2000	Newport RFC	18	(7)
2000-2005	Caerphilly RFC		
–	Cross Keys RFC		
International career
Years	Team	Apps	(Points)
1995-1997	Wales	9	(5)

William Justin Lloyd Thomas (born 1 November 1973) is a Welsh International rugby union player. He made nine appearances for the Wales national team, as well as representing Llanelli RFC Cardiff RFC, Newport RFC and Caerphilly RFC in the top division of Welsh club rugby.

Thomas was playing for UWIC RFC in the second division of Welsh club rugby when he was first called up to the Wales national team, as an unused replacement for their Five Nations game against Scotland in March 1995. He was also included in Wales' squad for the 1995 Rugby World Cup, whilst playing at Cardiff Institute (UWIC) but didn't make any appearances during the tournament. Thomas made his debut for Wales against South Africa in September 1995. Thomas started all four of Wales' matches in the 1996 Five Nations Championship, as well as the friendly match against Fiji and Italy in 1996 where Thomas scored a try for the national team v Italy.

Thomas joined Cardiff RFC for the 1996-97 season, where he spent three seasons. He moved to Newport RFC for the 1999-2000 season. After one season at Newport, Thomas moved to Caerphilly RFC, where he could combine playing part-time with pursuing a teaching career. By 2001, Thomas had returned to UWIC as a mature student, studying for a Postgraduate Certificate in Education. While at Caerphilly, Thomas played in the 2002–03 European Shield final loss against Castres Olympique.

As well as playing for the full Wales team, Thomas also represented Wales Students, and made two appearances for the Barbarians invitational side.

As of 2024, Thomas is Director of Standards for physical education at Bassaleg School.
