= Angela Hui =

Welsh journalist and author (born 1991)

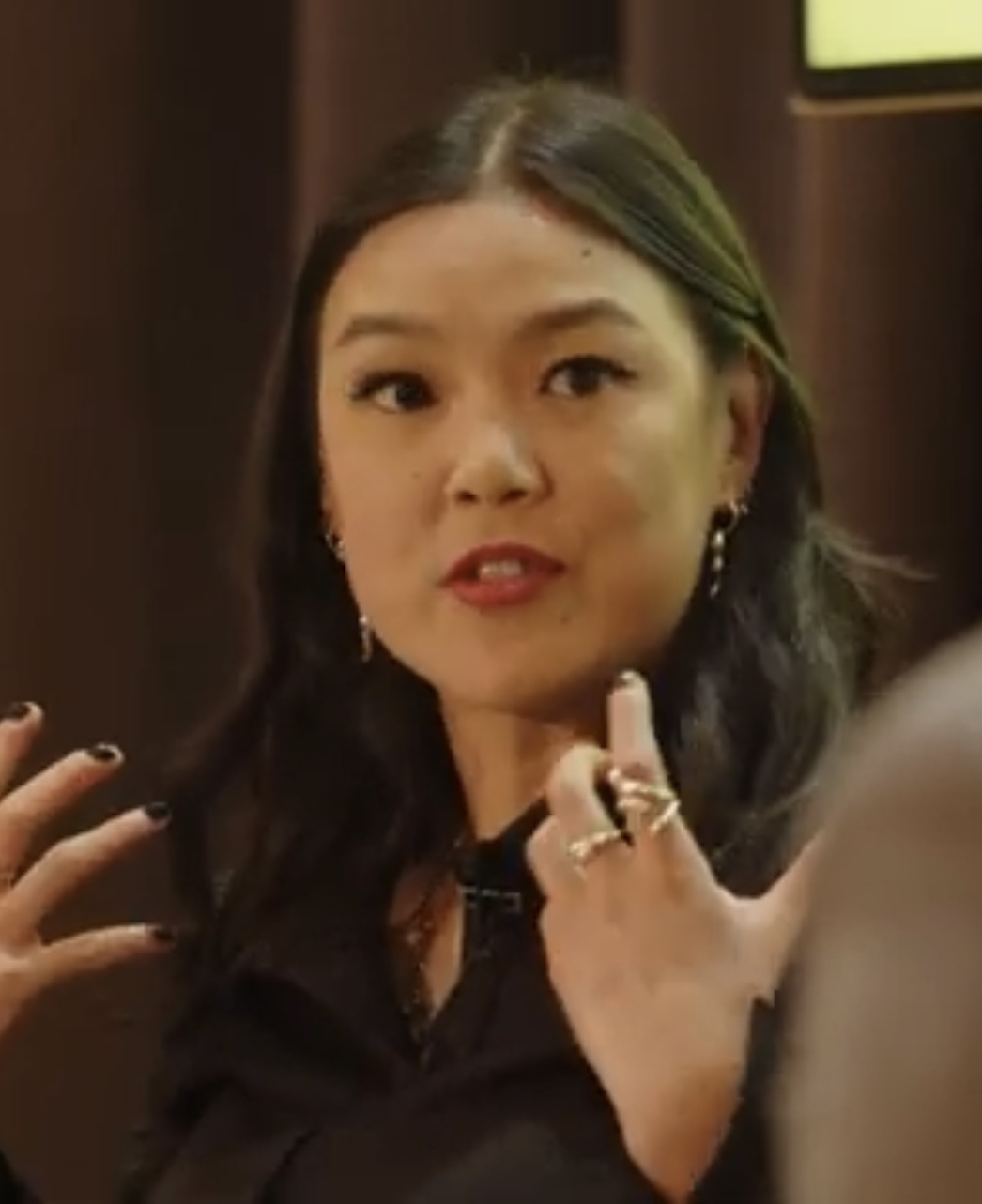
- Hui at the British Library in 2023
- Born: 1991 (age 34–35); Beddau, Wales
- Education: University of Glamorgan (BA); Cardiff University (MA)
- Years active: 2015–present
- Website: www.angelahui.co.uk

Angela Hui (born 1991) is a Welsh journalist and author. Her memoir Takeaway: Stories from a Childhood Behind the Counter (2022) was shortlisted for the 2023 Jhalak Prize.

== Early life ==
Hui was born 1991 in Beddau, a Welsh former mining village next to Pontypridd, to a father from Sai Kung and a mother from Shenzhen. Her parents had left Hong Kong for Britain in 1985, working at Chinese takeaways in Bournemouth, Reading, and London before settling in Beddau, where they opened their own takeaway called Lucky Star in 1988. It operated out of a converted terrace house on Commercial Street, and Hui lived above the shop with her two older brothers and helped out from the age of 8. Their relatives also opened takeaways in Pontlottyn, Bargoed and Blackwood.

Hui graduated from the University of Glamorgan in 2012 with a Bachelor of Arts (BA) in Journalism. She won a scholarship to pursue a Master of Arts (MA) in Magazine Journalism at Cardiff University. During her time at Cardiff, she was part of the magazine Feast.

== Career ==
In 2020, Hui joined HuffPost UK as a lifestyle reporter, writing about food, travel, and other topics. In 2021, Hui became a food and drink editor at Time Out London. She also contributed to the likes of Eater London, Vice, The Independent, and gal-dem.

In 2022, Trapeze (an Orion Publishing Group imprint) acquired the rights to publish Hui's debut book and memoir Takeaway: Stories from a Childhood Behind the Counter, delving into Hui's experiences, positive, negative and bittersweet, growing up in a Chinese takeaway in rural Wales, which her parents sold in 2018. Hui had written the memoir during the COVID-19 lockdown, and said the rise in anti-East Asian racism at the time was a motivating factor. Georgina Leung provided the illustrations. The book also incorporates Cantonese recipes. Takeaway was shortlisted for the 2023 Jhalak Prize and a Fortnum & Mason Award in the Debut Food Book category.

== Bibliography ==
=== Books ===
- Takeaway: Stories from a Childhood Behind the Counter (2022). ISBN 978-1-3987-0555-5.

=== Other ===
- Essay in The Polyester Book of Bad Taste (2026) edited by Ione Gamble
