= Greg Thomas =

Welsh cricketer

Personal information
- Full name: John Gregory Thomas
- Born: 12 August 1960 (age 66); Trebanos, Glamorgan, Wales
- Batting: Right-handed
- Bowling: Right-arm fast
- Role: Bowler

International information
- National side: England
- Test debut (cap 515): 21 February 1986 v West Indies
- Last Test: 7 August 1986 v New Zealand
- ODI debut (cap 86): 18 February 1986 v West Indies
- Last ODI: 25 May 1987 v Pakistan

Domestic team information
- Years: Team
- 1979–1988: Glamorgan
- 1983/84–1986/87: Border
- 1984/85–1986/87: Impalas
- 1987/88–1988/89: Eastern Province
- 1989–1991: Northamptonshire

Career statistics
Competition	Test	ODI	FC	LA
Matches	5	3	192	193
Runs scored	83	1	3,419	1,536
Batting average	13.83	1.00	16.43	13.12
100s/50s	0/0	0/0	2/7	0/1
Top score	31*	1*	110	65*
Balls bowled	774	156	27,916	8,801
Wickets	10	3	525	233
Bowling average	50.40	48.00	31.05	27.32
5 wickets in innings	0	0	18	3
10 wickets in match	0	0	1	0
Best bowling	4/70	2/59	7/75	5/17
Catches/stumpings	0/–	0/–	74/–	36/–
- Source: CricketArchive, 19 August 2012

Greg Thomas (born John Gregory Thomas, 12 August 1960) is a Welsh former cricketer, who played in five Test matches and three One Day Internationals for England between 1986 and 1987.

== Life and career ==
Thomas was born in Trebanos in Glamorgan. He was a genuine fast bowler, a rare sight in English cricket after the retirement of Bob Willis. However, apart from the raw pace, he was erratic and often had injury problems. At his best, he matched the speed of the fearsome West Indian pacemen on the tour of West Indies in 1985/86, but leaked too many runs with his wayward bowling. That difficult tour was followed by one Test in England, disruptive injury, and then a fruitless switch to play for Northamptonshire.

Highlights of his brief Test career included participating in a last-wicket stand of 72 with Richard Ellison in his second match, and taking 4–70 in his third. However, because he was in a struggling England side, and played most of his Tests against a dominant West Indies team, as of 2022, he jointly holds the unwanted record of playing the most Tests of any England player always to finish on the losing side. He did at least finish on the winning side in one of his one-day internationals against Pakistan, taking two wickets in his first over and helping in the last-wicket stand with Neil Foster that secured a series-clinching victory.

Thomas played for an England XI in limited-overs match against a Netherlands XI in 1989. However, he then joined the rebel tour to South Africa 1989–90 as a replacement for Philip DeFreitas, defying the international sporting boycott of the apartheid state. Although he took a first-class career-best 7 for 75 for Northamptonshire against Glamorgan the following season, Thomas had further injury problems and did not play for England again.

The West Indian batsman Viv Richards was notorious for punishing bowlers who dared to sledge him. So much so, that many opposing captains banned their players from the practice. However, in a county game against Glamorgan, Thomas attempted to sledge him after he had played at and missed several balls in a row. He told Richards: "It's red, round and weighs about five ounces, in case you were wondering". Richards hammered the next delivery out of the ground and into a nearby river. Turning to the bowler, he commented: "Greg, you know what it looks like, now go and find it".
