= Richard Diplock =

Wales international rugby union player

- Full name: Richard Sean Diplock
- Born: 7 May 1965 (age 61) Ebbw Vale, Wales
- Height: 5 ft 11 in (180 cm)

Rugby union career
- Position: Wing
International career
Years	Team	Apps	(Points)
1988	Wales	1	(0)

Richard Sean Diplock (born 7 May 1965) is a Welsh former rugby union international.

Born in Ebbw Vale, Diplock was educated at Glan Afan Comprehensive School.

Diplock, who is a steelworker by profession, played his rugby union as a winger and represented Wales Youth. His only Wales cap came in a loss at home to Romania in 1988. He competed mostly for Aberavon and Bridgend at club level, with a stint too at Sydney club Drummoyne, before retiring from rugby at the age of 35.

== See also ==
- List of Wales national rugby union players
