= Arwel Thomas =

Welsh rugby player

- Born: Arwel Camber Thomas; 8 November 1974 (age 52) Glanamman, Carmarthenshire, Wales
- Height: 1.73 m (5 ft 8 in)
- Weight: 72 kg (11.3 st; 159 lb)
- School: Cwmtawe Comprehensive School

Rugby union career
- Position: Fly-half
Youth career
- Trebanos
Senior career
Years	Team	Apps	(Points)
1993–1994	Swansea	1	(0)
1994–1995	Neath		
1995–1996	Bristol		
1996–2003	Swansea	153	(1,974)
2003–2004	Pau		
2004–2006	Llanelli Scarlets	12	(32)
2004–2005	Llandovery	1	(0)
2005	Harlequins	4	(30)
2005–2006	Carmarthen Quins	1	
2005–2008	Neath		
International career
Years	Team	Apps	(Points)
1996–2000	Wales	23	(211)

Arwel Camber Thomas (born 8 November 1974) is a Welsh former professional rugby union player who played as a fly-half. Born in Trebanos in the Swansea Valley, he played international rugby for Wales, earning 23 caps between 1996 and 2000. He played club rugby for Swansea, Neath, Bristol, Pau, the Llanelli Scarlets and Harlequins.

== Career ==
Thomas won his first of his 23 caps against Italy in 1996 when he replaced the injured Neil Jenkins in the starting line-up. He played club rugby for Swansea for seven years, scoring 1,974 points, including 39 tries. He turned down an offer to join Toulouse in 1999, and in 2005 he returned to Neath. In 2008 he announced his retirement from rugby after the 2008 Konica Minolta Cup final against Pontypridd. Thomas later reversed his decision and was given the captaincy of Neath for the 2009–10 season.
