= Trebanos =

Village in Neath Port Talbot, Wales

Coordinates: 51.711°N 3.865°W

Trebanos: Welsh: Trebannws
- Location within Neath Port Talbot
- OS grid reference: SN721040
- Principal area: Neath Port Talbot
- Preserved county: West Glamorgan
- Country: Wales
- Sovereign state: United Kingdom
- Post town: SWANSEA
- Postcode district: SA8
- Dialling code: 01792
- Police: South Wales
- Fire: Mid and West Wales
- Ambulance: Welsh
- UK Parliament: Brecon, Radnor and Cwm Tawe,

Trebanos (Welsh: Trebannws) is a village in the Swansea Valley, Wales. With Craig Trebanos and a part of Pontardawe, it forms the Trebanos electoral ward in the Neath Port Talbot county borough.

Controversy and opposition concerning the South Wales Gas Pipeline passing through the village led to media attention for the village and a protest camp in 2006 and 2007.

== Name ==
The village's name in standard Welsh is 'Trebannws'. But in the Welsh-language dialect of the area, there is a tendency to pronounce the final vowel as an 'o'. This has given rise to the form 'Trebanos', which is the form usually used in English.

== Education ==
A Welsh-medium primary school, Ysgol Gynradd Gymraeg Trebanos, is located in the village.

== Sport ==
Trebanos is home to the rugby union club Trebanos RFC. Founded in 1887, as of May 2025 it plays in the WRU Championship West league.

== Notable residents ==
Notable people from Trebanos include rugby union players Bleddyn Bowen, who captained Wales to the 1988 Triple Crown; Robert Jones, who was capped for Wales 54 times and helped win the 1988 Triple Crown; fly-half Arwel Thomas, who was capped for Wales 23 times; and openside flanker Justin Tipuric.

Greg Thomas, a first-class cricketer and fast bowler, was born in Trebanos.

Actress Harriet Lewis, who played Maggie Post in the Welsh soap opera Pobol y Cwm, was born in Trebanos.
