= Bedwas RFC =

Welsh rugby union club, based in Bedwas

(Wales) Bedwas RFC
- Full name: Bedwas Rugby Football Club
- Founded: 1889; 137 years ago
- Location: Bedwas, Wales
- Ground: The Bridge Field (Capacity: 3,000)
- League: Welsh Premiership
- 2026-2027: Welsh Premier Division
Team kit

Official website
- www.bedwasrfc.co.uk

Bedwas RFC (Welsh: Clwb Rygbi Bedwas) is a rugby union club located in the Welsh town of Bedwas. Bedwas has two senior teams, their 1st XV competing in the Welsh Championship and their development side, Bedwas Athletic . The club is a member of the Welsh Rugby Union and is a feeder club for Dragons regional team.

== Club history ==
Like many Welsh rugby teams the origin of the club is difficult to piece together having been formed by local workers rather than by a college or university. There is some evidence that a team played in Bedwas as early as 1885, though official recognition of Bedwas RFC is placed at 1889.

Bedwas RFC was a founding member of both the Junior Monmouthshire League (1903) and the Rhymney Valley League (1906), and in 1910 applied for and succeeded in joining the Welsh Rugby Union. At the outbreak of World War I (1914) rugby ceased in most of South Wales and this was true of Bedwas. After the war a period of rebuilding occurred with the club based initially at the Church Inn before moving to Bridge End Inn during the 1920–21 season. During this period Bedwas RFC enjoyed connections with local colliery owner and airline magnate Sir Samuel Instone.

1926 saw a great economic depression in South Wales and as local young men left to find work in more prosperous areas, rugby in Bedwas waned.

Post World War II saw a rebuilding of rugby in Bedwas and in 1947 the club acquired Bridge field and an ex-Ministry of Works long hut which became the club house. In 1960 the club formed a youth team. Bedwas also have a very successful seconds side which remains undefeated in the 2007–08 season.

In 2007, Bedwas were the only club in the Welsh Premier League to be threatened with relegation due to them initially failing a facilities review conducted by the WRU.

In 2026, Bedwas won the double, securing both the Championship East title and the Welsh Championship Cup Final, and regaining their place in the Welsh Premiership.

== Notable former players ==
The following players have represented Bedwas and have been capped at international level.

See also Category:Bedwas RFC players

- (Wales) Terry Cook (2 caps)
- (Wales) Leighton Jenkins (5 caps)
- (Wales) Eddie Watkins (8 caps)
- (Wales) Jeff Whitefoot (19 caps)
- (Wales) Elliot Dee (55 caps)
