= Maesteg Harlequins RFC =

Welsh rugby union club, based in Maesteg

(Wales) Maesteg Harlequins (Tir Iarll) RFC
- Full name: Maesteg Harlequins Rugby Football Club
- Nickname: Quins
- Founded: 1899(c)
- Location: Maesteg, Wales
- Ground: South Parade Playing Fields (Capacity: 2,999)
- President: Robert Williams
- Coach(es): Dean Ronan, Grant Epton
- League: WRU Division One South-West
Team kit

Official website
- www.maesteg-quins.co.uk

Maesteg Harlequins RFC is a rugby union team from the town of Maesteg, Wales. The Maesteg Harlequins were founded in 1899, their first captain being Tom Duckfield. They have reformed under different guises Llynfi Harlequins, Maesteg IIs, Maesteg Rangers, Maesteg Reserves, Maesteg Rovers and Tir Iarll Harlequins, but for the majority of their 126 years they have been known as Maesteg Harlequins. The club is a member of the Welsh Rugby Union having been made full members in 1987.

== Club honours ==
- WRU National League 1 West Central Champions 2017-2018
- WRU West Championship Play-Off Winners 2017-2018
- WRU National League 2 West Central Champions 2013-2014
- WRU National League 3 West Central Champions 2011-2012
- WRU National League 3 West Central Champions 2004-2005
- WRU National League 4 West Central Champions 2010-2011
- WRU National League 5 West Central Champions 2001–2002
- WRU National League 6 West Central Champions 2000–2001
- WRU National League 7 West Central Champions 1997–1998
- Glamorgan County Silver Ball Winners: 2000–2001 & 2010-2011
- Glamorgan County Silver Ball Finalists: 2011-2012 & 2017-2018
- Glamorgan County President's Cup Winners: 2000–2001 & 2010-2011
- Glamorgan County President's Cup Finalists: 1997-1998
- Hancocks HB Trophy Winners: 1997 – 1998
- Glamorgan County 'Performance of the Year': 1997 – 1998
- WRU SWALEC National Bowl Finalists: 2010-2011
- Central Glamorgan Cup Finalists: 1995–1996, 1997–1998 & 2001–2002
- Wistech Central Glamorgan League 3 Runner-up 1989-1990
- Wistech Central Glamorgan League 2 Runner-up 1990-1991
- Maesteg and District Champions 1899-1900
- Mid-Glam D.R.U. Division 1 Winners 2013-2014
- Mid-Glam D.R.U. Div 1 Play-off Winners 2013-2014
- Mid-Glam D.R.U. Division Two Winners: 1996 – 1997
- Mid-Glam D.R.U. ‘Lyn Sports’ Cup Winners: 1977 – 1978
- Mid-Glam D.R.U. ‘Lyn Sports’ Cup Finalists: 2006–2007; 2005 – 2006, 2004–2005 & 2003–2004
- Mid-Glam D.R.U. Plate Finalists 2013-2014
- Maesteg and District Champions 1899-1900

Seven-a-Side:

- Mid-Glamorgan DRU Sevens Winners 1961
- Bedlinog Sevens Winners 1988
- Le Havre Sevens Winners 1975
- Evs 7s Plate Winners 2011 & 2014
