= Ystrad Rhondda RFC =

Welsh rugby union club, based in Ystrad

Wales
- Full name: Ystrad Rhondda Rugby Football Club
- Founded: 1884; 142 years ago
- Location: Ystrad, Rhondda, Wales
- Ground: Gelligaled Park
- Coach(es): Bradley Hughes; Dylan Jones; Tom Heatherington
- Captain: Jarrad Llewellyn
- Most caps: Nathan Hughes (420)
- Top scorer: Rhys Truelove (1,000+)
- League: WRU Admiral Premiership
- 2024-25: 8th of 13
Team kit	Change kit

Official website
- www.ystradrhondda.rfc.wales

Ystrad Rhondda Rugby Football Club (Welsh: Clwb Rygbi Ystrad Rhondda) is a Welsh rugby union team based in Ystrad in the Rhondda Valley. The club was founded in 1884. Ystrad Rhondda RFC plays in the Welsh Rugby Union WRU Admiral Premiership.

== History ==
=== Foundation and early years ===
The club was founded in 1884 and is described by Beddau RFC as one of the leading Rhondda Valley and Mid District clubs. The earliest recorded match between Ystrad Rhondda and Pontypridd RFC took place on 24 September 1885, at Ystrad Rhondda, with Pontypridd winning by a goal, a try, and two touches down to nil.

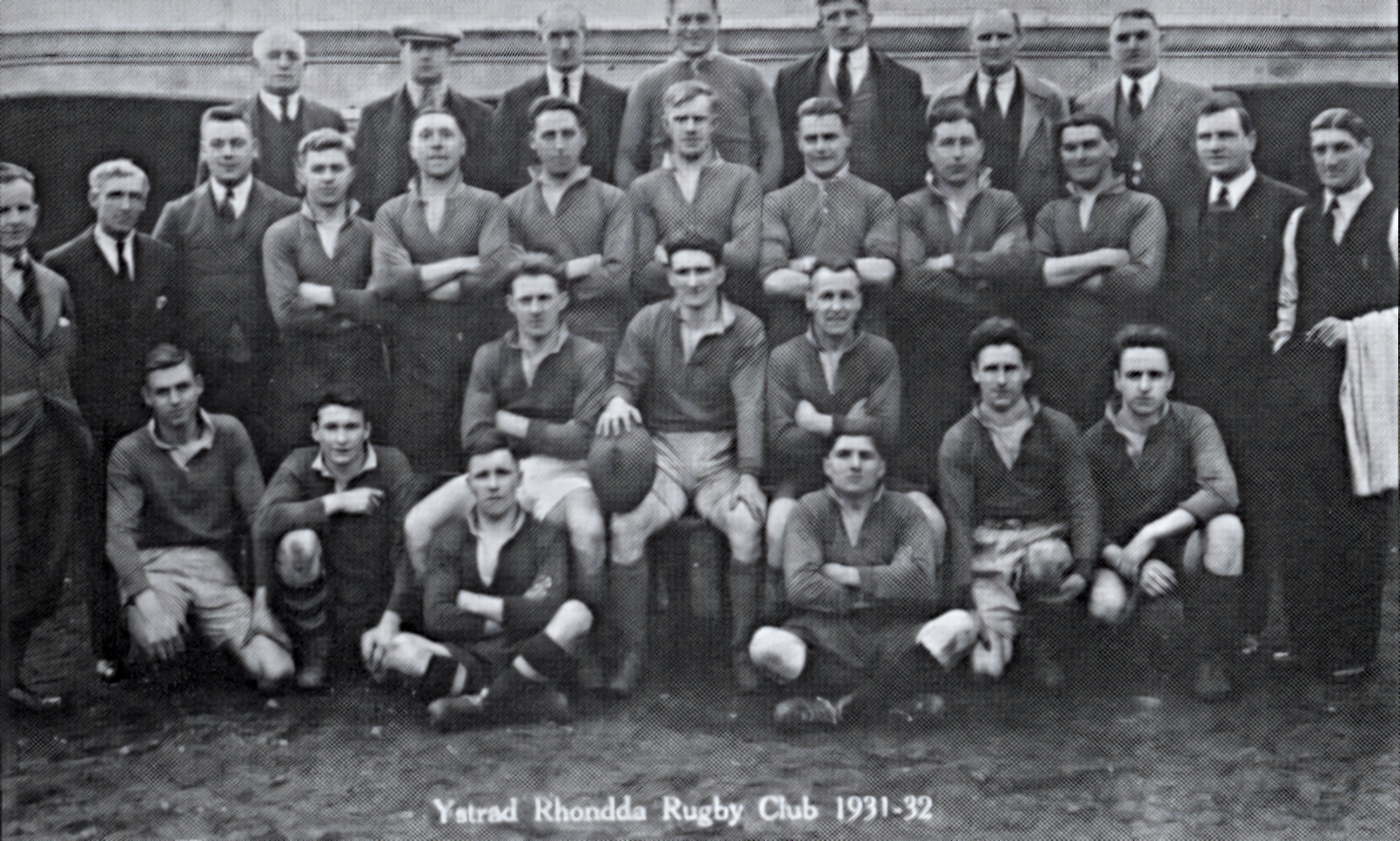
Ystrad Rhondda RFC squad, taken for the 1931-32 season

Willie Llewellyn began his rugby career at Ystrad Rhondda before moving on to play for Wales.

== Ground ==
The club plays at Gelligaled Park. First laid out in the 1920s, the space includes playing fields for rugby and cricket, a children's play area, a skatepark and bowling green.

== Current squad and structure ==
The club has junior teams, a youth side and a second XV.

Nathan Hughes played 420 times for Ystrad and retired at the end of the 2023-24 season, having been with the club since the age of 18. Outside-half Rhys Truelove has appeared more than 250 times and has scored over 1,000 points for the club.

== Honours ==
=== Domestic ===
- WRU Division One East Central:
  - Titles (1): 2017–18
- WRU Division Two East:
  - Titles (3): 2004–05, 2007–08, 2011–12
- Welsh League Division 6 Central:
  - Titles (1): 1994–95
- WRU Championship Cup:
  - Runners-up (1): 2022–23
- WRU Swalec Plate:
  - Winners (1): 2014–15
- Glamorgan County Silver Ball Trophy:
  - Runners-up (1): 2014–15
- Mid District Cup:
  - Winners (3): 1993–94, 2000–01, 2022–23
  - Runners-up (1): 2013–14

=== Notes ===
- All titles listed are at senior level unless otherwise stated
- Seasons shown reflect the Welsh rugby season format (e.g., 2022–23 represents the season spanning 2022 to 2023)

== Notable players ==
Willie Llewellyn began his rugby career at Ystrad Rhondda and went on to play for Wales, scoring four tries on his debut against England in 1899. He was a member of the Welsh team that defeated the All Blacks in 1905.

Mike Griffiths is a product of Ystrad Rhondda RFC who returned to coach the club after his playing career. He earned 38 caps for Wales and toured with the British & Irish Lions in 1989.

Alex Webber, another product of the club, played on the World Sevens circuit for Wales between 2012 and 2015. After 120 appearances and 69 tries for Pontypridd RFC, he returned to Ystrad as player-coach.
