= Glamorgan Wanderers RFC =

Welsh rugby union club, based in Ely

(Wales) Glamorgan Wanderers RFC
- Full name: Glamorgan Wanderers Rugby Football Club
- Nickname: The Wands
- Founded: 1893; 133 years ago
- Location: Cardiff, Wales
- Ground: Memorial Ground (Capacity: 3000)
- Chairman: Alyn Humphreys
- Coach: (Wales) Paul Matthews
- Captain: (Wales) Joshua Male
- League: WRU Championship East
- 2023/24: 9th
1st kit	2nd kit

Official website
- www.glamorganwanderers.co.uk

Glamorgan Wanderers are a Welsh rugby union club based in Ely, west Cardiff in Wales. The club is located just to the north of Western Cemetery. They currently play in the WRU Admiral Championship. Glamorgan Wanderers began as the Old Monktonians, formed by ex-pupils of Monkton House School in 1893. In 1913 the team changed their name to Glamorgan Wanderers to reflect the wider intake of their membership. The club played rugby on seven different grounds in the earlier years, including former Cardiff RFC ground Sophia Gardens and Llandaff RFC's pitch Bishop's Field, until they were able to purchase their present ground in 1951. The ground was purchased via various fund raising appeals and is named the Memorial Ground in honour of former players who had died in the two World Wars.

Former President of the club, and of the Welsh Rugby Union, and Deputy Lord Chief Justice, Sir Tasker Watkins, V.C., G.B.E., D.L. was awarded the Victoria Cross for his outstanding bravery in the Second World War.

== Rugby Sevens ==
The Wanderers were an important influence on rugby sevens in Wales, having hosted the country's first seven-a-side competition in April 1939. The game of seven-a-side rugby had been played in England since 1926, but the Welsh Rugby Union had blocked any attempts for the game to be played for profit. The profits from these first games by Glamorgan Wanderers were donated to charities stipulated by the WRU.

== Club honours ==
- Snelling Sevens 1986 - Champions
- Glamorgan County Silver Ball Trophy 1999-00 - Winners

== Coaches ==
- Head Coach (and backs coach) - Paul Matthews - Forwards Coach - Lee Highgate - Ceri Jones - S&C Coach - Team Manager - Mark Gould

== Notable former players ==
The following players have represented Glamorgan Wanderers and have been capped at international level.

- (Wales) Lynn 'Cowboy' Davies
- (Wales) Rhys Gill
- (Wales) Sam Warburton
- (Wales) Lloyd Williams
- (Wales) Josh Navidi
- (Wales) Andy Powell
- (Wales) Cory Allen
- (Wales) John Yapp
- (Wales) Gary Powell
- (Wales) Robin Sowden-Taylor
- (Australia) Ben White
- (Wales) Scott Andrews

== Games played against international opposition ==
Year	Date	Opponent	Result	Score	Tour
1987	28 October	United States	Win	25-6	1987 United States rugby union tour of Wales
