= Tata Steel RFC =

Welsh rugby union club, based in Port Talbot

(Wales) Corus Saints RFC
- Full name: Corus Saints Rugby Football Club
- Nickname: The Saints
- Founded: 1908; 118 years ago
- Location: Port Talbot, Wales
- Ground(s): Margam Sports & Social Club, Port Talbot
- Chairman: Alf Hays
- Coach: Lee Ratti
- League: WRU Championship
- 2011/12: 1st
Team kit

Official website
- www.pitchero.com/clubs/tatasteel/

Corus Rugby Football Club was a Welsh rugby union clubs based in Port Talbot. It is now known as Tata Steel RFC, the club is a member of the Welsh Rugby Union and is a feeder club for the Ospreys.

The club was historically known as The S.C.O.W, Steel Company of Wales, but changed its name to British Steel RFC in the late 1960s when the steel manufacture British Steel evolved from The SCOW. The name Tata Steel RFC was adopted following the demise of Corus and formally British Steel but locally, the team is still known as "The SCOW".

The team plays at the sports ground at Margam (just off J.38 of the M4) which it shares with other sections - Cricket, Soccer, Bowls etc.

Although it could be considered as a "works side" traditionally most of its players have not worked within the industry but have been Margam and Port Talbot parishners.

Over the years there has been a mistaken belief that the steel industry itself have sponsored the team, though this is untrue. Since 1980, the club has been totally self-sufficient due to the work of the committee and sponsors.

Like many of other rugby clubs, during the earlier part of this Century, playing numbers started to dwindle and the Club successfully joined up with a local District side called St Josephs Old Boys RFC. This jump started the Club and they quickly moved up the leagues.

Since the formation of the professional era the club has lost its local player base but this is being effectively managed

== Notable former players ==
Traditionally the club has produced a strong youth team. Between the 1960s and 1980s in particular the team was one of the strongest lower tier clubs in Wales producing the following players who moved on to the then "first class" set up - Mark Morgan (Aberavon), Alfred "Alfie" Hayes (Bridgend), John Mahoney (Aberavon), Richie Davies (Aberavon) - Captain during their Centenary Season, Hedley Jenkins (Bridgend ), Paul Hughes (Neath), Jeffrey Griffiths (Aberavon, Llanelli and Wales (Romania 1979- an un-capped game at the time)), Martin Thomas (Aberavon), Paul Ridsdale (Aberavon), Andrew Twomey (Aberavon, Maesteg), Robert Emmitt (Aberavon), Kevin O'Leary (Aberavon), Hywel Evans (Aberavon), Phil George (Aberavon), Dai Rees (Aberavon & South Wales Police RFC, Ian Rees (Neath & Maesteg), Robert Beresford (Aberavon), Andrew Jones (Aberavon and Bridgend), Stuart Evans (Swansea, Neath and Wales), Dai Joseph (Aberavon, Swansea, Cardidd and Neath), Huw Griffiths (Aberavon and South Wales Police RFC), Lee Bridgeman (Aberavon), Deane Jones (Aberavon, South Wales Police RFC and Neath), Richard Diplock (Wales - one cap v. Romania 1988), Chris Bradshaw (Aberavon, Bridgend, Cardiff and Swansea), Wayne Morris (Aberavon), John Wilyeo (Aberavon), Phil Hamley (Aberavon)- Captain.

== Club honours ==
- WRU Division One West 2011/2012 - Champions
