= Trebanos RFC =

Welsh rugby union club, based in Swansea

(Wales) Trebanos RFC
- Full name: Trebanos Rugby Football Club
- Nickname(s): Banws, The Crows
- Founded: 1897; 129 years ago
- Location: Trebanos, Wales
- Ground: The Park (Capacity: Unknown)
- Chairman: Chris Penhale
- Coach: Rhodri Jones/Justin Tipuric
- Captain: Rhys Thomas
- League: WRU National Championship

Official website
- www.trebanos.rfc.wales

Trebanos Rugby Football Club (Welsh: Clwb Rygbi Trebannws) is a Welsh rugby union team officially founded in 1897. Trebanos RFC is a member of the Welsh Rugby Union and is a feeder club for the Ospreys.

== Club history ==
=== 1920s ===
The club re-formed at the end of the First World War and was soon at full strength. Trebanos joined the Swansea and District Rugby Union in 1920, and during that decade, often as not, the Championship or Cup finals were contested between Swansea Harbour, Clydach and Glais, or Trebanos. The bulk of the representative league side that opposed Swansea First XV came from Clydach and Glais (one club until Vardre was formed), Swansea Harbour and Trebanos clubs.

The ‘Ancient Borough’ distinguished themselves in various competitions in the league. Between 1923 and 1928, they won the Second Division championship twice and the First Division championship once. In 1928 they lost the Swansea and District Cup Final to Swansea Harbour 4-3, but in 1929 they won the cup, playing the final against the same opposition at the Mond Field, Clydach. The gate receipts that day were £8. In 1926 Trebanos won the SKEWEN Cup, an invitation competition. One of their most famous games took place during the Cup final of 1925 played at St Helen's Ground against Swansea Harbour. There was no score after regular time, and two periods of extra time were played. In the 119th minute, Swansea scored a try, which to all ‘True Blues’, was miles offside, however the referee explained later, that he had to go to work at 10.00 pm. From 1930 onwards the club took no further part in competitions until joining the Welsh Rugby Union (WRU) in 1948.

These were the days of the depression and many locals left the village to find work all over the country, however, with no work available the remaining team trained every day. These were rough times but it produced some quality players notably William Bowen (Billy Boo), John Lewis (The Vaynol), Mel Lloyd, Elwyn Davies, Danny Hopkin and Aubrey Hyde, all played for Swansea.

=== 1930s ===
In the Thirties came the formation of the ex–schoolboys side Trebanos Barbarians, who like their prototypes placed accent on attacking play and in the process produced great performers. Who for instance, would deny that Arthur Kift as an outside half was the complete footballer and when he elected to join Newton Abbott in the years of industrial depression, he forfeited the opportunity of international recognition. He was for years, almost a permanent installation in the Devon County XV.

Then there was WT Jones (Willy Tom, who served as Treasurer in his beloved Trebanos club for 40 years) who caught the attention of those in charge at the Gnoll. He was a great player and a prolific try scoring winger, until the outbreak of war was to curtail a successful career as a ‘Mourner’. During the war Will was stationed in Cheshire in the RAF, where the Squadron Leader was an avid fan and Director of Wigan Rugby League club. Eventually he found out who Will was, and introduced him to Wigan, where Will played on the wing under an assumed name and received £3 a game plus every Saturday off. This was not to last! Senior officers uncovered that Will was a star in Welsh rugby and he was confined to rugby union with his camp side and the RAF. W.T.Jones returned after the war and played for Neath and Bridgend.

A controversy arose between Pontardawe and Trebanos when four members of Trebanos’ brilliant back division defected to play their football at Pontardawe in 1936, Danny Bowen, Arthur Kift, Mandy Kelly and WT Jones, and it was many years before the quartet were forgiven.

The club often produced famous backline players during this era, such as Danny Walters, who eventually played for Swansea and moved to London Welsh.

=== 1940s ===
Again the club was disbanded during the Second World War and re-formed in 1945, the chairman Tom Jones, secretary GB Williams and treasurer Stan John (plus Dai Gibbs as previously stated) making house to house collections in the village for clothing coupons so that a new rugby kit could be purchased.

Trebanos were one of the first minnow clubs to undertake a tour across the other side of Offa's Dyke. This annual pilgrimage first got underway in the twenties when they visited Durham.

In 1948 season they played three recognised Northern first class clubs, Percy Park, West Ho and Durham City, despite returning home empty handed they were not disgraced against such worthy opponents. The tour was organised by a former club player the Rev Len Lloyd Rees, who was then Chaplain at Durham Prison and latterly Bishop Len Lloyd Rees. He once fought Freddie Mills, the former world cruiserweight champion in a charity fight, which took place under lock and key, inside a prison of all places

Trebanos became a member of the Welsh Rugby Union in 1948, and with Mervyn Morgan now the Secretary, were successful in being accepted as members of the West Wales Rugby Union in 1949-50 season, the committee realising the way forward was playing organised league rugby.

=== 1950s ===
During the 1950s the club was always in the top half of the West Wales League table, which comprised 36 teams. Trebanos once met Llandybie in a first round cup match which developed into a four-game epic before eventually winning 16-3.

During this period they produced fine footballers in Ken and Des Lloyd, Gwyn Rees, Les James, John Lewis, Glan Morgan, Brian Canning, Peter Parker, Len Thomas, Tom Jones, Morgan Jones, Howell Hughes, John and Jack Lewis, Cliff Jones, Emlyn and Ned Thomas, Danny Walters, Jack Lewis, John Gower Rees, Anuerin Rees, Ceri Davies, Jim MacNamara, Bill Rees, Will Thomas, Howard James, Ken Davies, Byron Hopkin, Cliff Jones, Eurof Davies, Dilwyn Hughes, Doug Evans, Denzil Edwards David M Williams and hosts of others. During this period prop Islwyn Phillips created a club record playing in 88 consecutive games.

A former Trebanos player, Danny Griffiths was killed in the Llandow air disaster on 12 March 1950, returning from Ireland where Wales had won the Triple Crown.

After the war Trebanos produced a trio of players that all played with distinction for Swansea; Herbert Thomas, a wing who went on to play a final Welsh trial. Few players have sped down the St Helens touchline with more determination than Herbert and with a low centre of gravity and took an awful lot of tackling. In 1953/54 season whilst playing for Trebanos he was the only player in West Wales to cross for a try against Seven Sisters at their home ground.

=== 1960s ===
During the 1960s the club once more unearthed a wealth of talent and most of it was homebred. Indeed, in the 1959/60 season a glut of players started at the same time and even the same day. With prompting from Stan John and G.B. Williams, and the promise of a forthcoming tour to Marlow, the following young players started playing on the same day: Anthony Lloyd, Brian Rocke, Brynley Williams, Gerald Jones, Roy Bowen and Jeff Rhodes, and shortly after them came John Williams (from Birchgrove Stars) Eifryn Paddison (from Glais), Alwyn Thomas, Dai Daniels, Gerwyn Daniels, Colin Bowden, Reggie Jones, Adrian Chudleigh, Vernon Williams, Alwyn Williams Dai Howells (who became a top class referee and Secretary of Bonymaen RFC for many years), Mike Baugh, Hywel Pickerell, Ken Harris, Howard Williams, Islwyn Jenkins, Keri Jones, (who was in Ystalyfera Grammar School and played with the seconds, soon to be capped by Wales in 1967 and a British Lion in South Africa 1968, went North and played rugbyleague for Wigan), Keith Williams, Huw Williams, Noel Williams, Mike Thomas, Clive Sterl, Terry Bevan, Stuart Jones, John Walsh, Colin Herbert, Roland Williams, Robert Edwards, Mike Griffiths, David Jones, Stuart Fjaelberg, Gordon Best, Hugh Vaughan, Keith Davey, John Mills, Gary Landeg, Vernon Steadman, Alan Borsden from Vardre, David Pickerell, Ken Williams (former World and European power lifting champion, now weights manager at Trebanos RFC gymnasium) and Alan Jones (who won the British Athletics Youth hurdles championship and a terrific winger, Alan's studies took him to Northampton and he is now Dr Alan Jones).

With other young players including Peter Williams, Vian Lloyd, Tudor Davies, Del Williams, G.B.Morgan, Gwyn Williams, Glyn Lewis, Raymond Thomas, Derek Evans, Gwynne Morgan (Clydach), Tudor Ben Davies, Neil Kelly and Peter Thomas already playing for the firsts and second teams, the club maintained an active roster.

However that was soon to be changed, John Rodgers, a great clubman, received fatal injuries during a game with Gowerton at Trebanos Park in 1959. The committee, after launching an appeal, collected £2000 for his young widow and son. Gomer Davies, who was secretary at that time, was unstinting in his efforts to offer support to the family and administered the trust over many years. A charity match was played at Trebanos Park in aid of the fund.

When Eddie Burns the former Swansea hooker heard that Trebanos were without a hooker he offered his services, which the club accepted. Eddie brought some players with him to fill the team, including a big No 8 called John Bayliss, and John Greco, who eventually became winner of the British Latin/American dancing championship. John now has a school of dancing in Swansea. He later brought Arthur John, to play at the club and Arthur served Trebanos unstintingly in the 60's and 70's. Ken Hill, a prop forward of repute and a former Welsh Youth international, had transferred from Glais in 1959 and gained a Glamorgan County Cap and also represented Neath. Ken was building a house in Trebanos, and luckily for Trebanos it happened to be opposite G.B.Williams, the chairman's, residence.

=== 1970s ===
Whilst the club were proud of the players' achievements and education, career ambitions took many players from the village and the committee campaigned tirelessly to attract players to the club.

Velindre Tinworks was a source of talent for the club, with GB Williams, a superintendent, and Stan John, a senior hand at the works, plus a number of players employed by the company, all helping to recruit players to the club. Such were Michael Davies (Spike), who played on the wing for 14 seasons; Mike Jones (Kamikaze), who played on the other wing for seven seasons; Peter Roberts, who served the club as first and seconds player; and Malcolm Evans, a prop nicknamed Mad Murdoch.

During this era there came a tremendous number of players who had talent but the side underachieved after the heady days of 1969/1970/71 seasons when Trebanos won the Swansea Valley Cup.

During this period all three Penhale brothers played and they gave faithful service to the club. Clive, gained an Under 18 Welsh Boys Club Cap in 1968 and progressed to play for the club for 14 successive years and is the current Chairman of Trebanos RFC. Lynn played with distinction as a wing or centre and is the current Team Manager. Viv played for Trebanos at 17 years of age and had so much talent as a player that he must be classed as one of Trebanos's best outside half's. His talents were recognised by Neath and they invited him to play, but Viv was happy at Trebanos and declined their offer.

Another player of the 60's, 70's and 80's decades was Keith Williams who had started with Trebanos in 1967, and was already the recipient of three Swansea Valley Cup winners medals 1969/70/71. Like Neal Rogers before him, Keith was an exceptional soccer and rugby player and played for Wales Boys Clubs Under 18 team against England at the Vetch field in 1966. Such was his talent that in the first five minutes the Wales centre half was injured and had to leave the field. Alas! These were the days of no substitutes and Keith was moved from his left half position to fulfil the role of centre half and such was his talent that he finished man of the match. Leicester City, then a first division side plagued him to sign, but like many others he declined. Keith played for Pontardawe in the Welsh league for a season or so and then came to Trebanos RFC. The three brothers Huw, Keith and Noel played for the club.

Keith probably came to Trebanos because his ‘partner in crime,’ was playing, one John Vernon Thomas, and indeed are still partners to this day. John was a blond haired baby faced centre that opposition players often underestimated. One such player was Elwyn Davies of Glais, who was a bull of a man and straight running centre. When he lined up against John in a local derby, he must have thought all his birthdays had come together, and proceeded to run at John, only to be tackled around his ankles. After four or five attempts with the same result, he got up off the ground put his arm around John and said to him ‘OK let’s get on with it and have a game’’. Unfortunately for John his career came to an abrupt end at Laugharne on Boxing Day 1974. He broke his leg and had kneecap surgery undergoing several operations. He was on crutches for eighteen months and it was two years before he returned to his employment. He never played again, but is a’ true blue’ and an avid supporter of Trebanos RFC .

=== 1980s ===
During the late seventies the team improved and when the eighties arrived, Trebanos had a decent side and were playing in Division E Wales Wales League. They had invested in youth and junior sides during the seventies and its benefits had started to filter through.

Some of the players of this era were, brothers Paul Thomas who played for Aberavon, Andrew Thomas who played for Bristol and Aberavon and Ian Pugh, Anthony Jones who played for Neath, Llanelli and South Wales Police, Phil Hamer who played for Llanelli, John Bale, Peter Curnow, Byron Temblett, Andrew Francis, Chris Francis, Ian Gibson, Nigel Doyle, Steve Doyle, Carey Edwards, Colin Jenkins, Anthony Maher, Sean Maher, Kevin Danahar, Danny Watkins, Huw Jones, Adrian Richards, Andrew Richards, Steve Gardiner, Alan Martin, Darwyn Hopkins, Ian Wilson, Dai Hills, Robert Bibbs, Anthony Morgan, Nigel Jones, Alan Dixon, Kevin Jones, Geraint Thomas who played for Bridgend, Anthony Stone, Michael Powell, Russell Rogers, Simon Evans, Steffan Penhale, Mark Harding, Gary Chivers, Justin Jones, Craig Jones, Andrew Williams, James Davies, Andrew Gibson, Paul Williams, Paul Penhale, Andrew Davies, Anthony Howells, Anthony Wheeler, Paul, Michael and Tony Eustace and Steve Lewis, a 'true blue' who played 23 seasons at the Ancient Borough.

In 1980-1981 season Trebanos played in Section E, until 1983–1984 when they were promoted to Section D. In 1987–1988 there was an exceptional side at Trebanos captained by Andrew Thomas, it won promotion to Section C, losing only one game away to Cwmllynfell by 18 –12. They also drew at home with Llandeilo 6-6. That season they won the Eurof Davies Cup scoring 53 tries, and were narrowly defeated in the semi-final of the West Wales Cup by Tumble at Brynamman 9-6.

In 1989–1990 Trebanos Park was under construction for the renewal of drainage and a new playing surface. No games were played there that season, ‘The Ancient Borough’, played on the field adjacent to the Park with the kind permission of John Griffiths the owner. This was a major factor in a poor season and were again relegated to division D, having suffered a disastrous season winning only one game against Carmarthen Athletic. Trebanos drew with Gorseinon and Bynea, finishing bottom of their section. Along the way in the eighties annual tours continued and International rugby players appeared.

=== 1990s ===
In the nineties, the club conjured up changes and professionalism that was never seen before. Vernon Pugh's decision of "today we are amateurs and tomorrow professional", did not favour the small village clubs. Trebanos were never financially able to pay players, and it suffered over the following years, losing good players to the paid ranks until today. However, because of its investment in junior and youth rugby, a steady stream of players came through the system. Such players were, Carwyn Young who represented Wales at Under 18, 19 & 21 levels and played for Neath, Llanelli and Aberavon, Simon Knight, Mark Bevan, Chris Harris, Clive Warburton, Ian Gibson, Kevin Williams, Teifion Thomas, Gareth Williams, Chris Penhale who captained Trebanos three successive seasons, Kevin Penhale, Richard Thomas, Stuart Thomas, Ian Taylor, Arwel Thomas who went on to win international caps, Reiland Davies, Steve Williams, Dafydd Thomas, Aled Rowlands, Peter Cane, Richard Preece, Rhodri Bowen, Ceri Bowen, Simon Davies, Andrew Thomas, Jason Bailey, Owen Pickerell, Hugh Pickerell, Jonathan Fuller, Ryan Phillips, Mark Evans, Robin Williams, Richard Walker, Richard Langford, Chris Davies, Bleddyn Howells, Simon Thomas, Nick Lloyd, Amer Hussein, Jamie Watkins, Chris Jones, Neil Jeremiah, Rhodri Jones, who played for Wales B, Neath, Swansea and Gwent Dragons who is the current Youth coach.

In 1990–1991 season Trebanos played in section D West Wales League and finished in third position with 18 points. The league system was re-organised in 1991–1992 season and Trebanos found itself playing in Group A, finishing with 15 points (seven wins and a draw).

The league was again re-organised the following season and the club found itself playing in Division C in 1992/93 and 1993/94 seasons finishing 5th and 2nd respectively. This was to be the end of West Wales League, and the following season clubs voted for a Welsh National League to be formed.

=== 2000s ===
In 2000 the committee gave all its 270 club members a memento to mark the turn of the century, a Welsh dragon in Trebanos colours. They also had for sale commemorative plates and tankards and celebrated throughout that season with functions at the clubhouse.

In 2000 the old Pheasant Bush public house had become available and the committee decided to purchase this property. After protracted negotiations they finally purchased the building in 2001. The old building was re-furbuished and new extensions built at a cost of over £400,000. On 3 December 2003 the club was officially opened by Glanmor Griffiths, former Treasurer and President of the WRU and also attending was David Moffett, Chief Executive of the WRU.

Trebanos RFC were now located at 123 Swansea Road, Trebanos. However, due to the debt this move incurred, Trebanos RFC committee were forced to recommend the sale of the club and at a duly convened meeting of members in November 2007 they voted for the social club to be sold.

Currently Trebanos play in the WRU Championship having made the ascent from Division Three in the last six years. The club currently run a second XV, a Youth XV and a junior section.

== Players ==
Player	Position	Union
Rhys Thomas (c)	Hooker (rugby union)	Wales
Craig Howells	Hooker (rugby union)	
Chris Balph	Prop	
Alan Dew	Prop	
David Davies	Prop	
Declan Bale	Lock	
Chris Scarf	Lock	
Rhodri Davies	Lock	
Lee Danden	Lock	
Sean Hopkins	Flanker	
Malcolm Whiteman	Flanker	
Amer Hussain	Flanker	
Luke Davies	Number 8	
Nathan Jones	Scrum-Half	
Nic Danjanovic	Fly-half	
Shaun Hamer	Fly-half	
Gareth Hopkins	Center	
Rhodri Thomas	Center	
Stefan Lewis	Center	
Matthew Edwards	Wing	
Andrew Penhale	Wing	
Michael Morgan	Wing	
Rhoss Jones	Fullback	
Cerith Edwards	Fullback	

== Internationals ==
=== Bleddyn Bowen ===
Bleddyn Bowen won his first cap from South Wales Police in 1983 against Romania and played 24 times for Wales, his final appearance was against Ireland at Cardiff in 1989. He scored 37 points for Wales and captained them in 6 internationals, leading Wales to the Triple Crown in 1988. He was chosen as captain for the subsequent summer tour of New Zealand in 1988 but a broken wrist ended his trip.

=== Robert Jones M.B.E ===
Robert Jones made his debut as a schoolboy for Swansea in 1983 and played 286 games for Swansea from 1983 to 2002, scoring 50 tries and captaining the team in 1989/90 and 1990/91. He played for the British Lions in 1989 and in 1993. He captained Wales on five occasions.

=== Arwel Thomas ===
Arwel Thomas represented Swansea on 152 occasions, scored 1,965 points and is the club's third most prolific points scorer. He represented Wales 23 times and scored 216 points (12 tries 32 penalties and 30 conversions).
