= Beddau RFC =

Welsh rugby union club, based in Beddau

(Wales) Beddau RFC
- Full name: Beddau Rugby Football Club
- Founded: 1951–52
- Location: Beddau, Wales
- Ground: Mount Pleasant Park (Capacity: 1000)
- Coach: Lee Davies
- Captain: Lloyd Evans
- League: Welsh Premier Division
- 2024/25: Welsh Championship East, 1st (promoted)
Team kit

Official website
- www.pitchero.com/clubs/beddaurfc/

Beddau Rugby Football Club is a rugby union team from the village of Beddau, South Wales. The present club was formed in 1951–52, but it can trace its roots to around 1900. Beddau RFC is a member of the Welsh Rugby Union and is a feeder club for Cardiff Blues.

== History ==
Beddau had a village rugby team from around 1900 until the Second World War. During the war all the club's records were destroyed apart from a few remaining photographs of Beddau RFC teams from the late 1930s.

Beddau RFC was reformed in 1951-52 and has since been based in Castellau Road, Beddau. The club plays at Mount Pleasant Park, Beddau.

== Today ==
Today, Beddau RFC competes in the WRU Championship. In the 2006–07 season, the club won the Division One East League but was denied promotion to the Premier League because their grounds did not meet WRU criteria—a decision later upheld at an EGM by 67% of members. The club was entered into the inaugural Swalec Championship and had several good seasons in the second WRU league tier before being relegated in 2013/14. In 2014/15 With new coaches Lee Davies and Ben Daniels at the helm the Green and Golds led by Glenn Slater bounced back immediately to the Championship winning the Division One East Central title in emphatic fashion, winning 21 out of their 22 fixtures and going unbeaten at home. Winning the league meant a Play-off game for promotion to the Championship against Penallta RFC which Beddau won convincingly 22–13.

The club has a mini and junior section, a Youth team that all feeds into the Development XV and 1st XV.

== Club honours ==
- Worthington's Mid District Cup 2007-08 – Winners
- Swalec Division One East Champions 2014/15
- WRU Division One East Champions – 2006–07
- Mid District Cup 2006-07 – Winners
- Mid District Cup 2005-06 – Winners
- Mid District Cup 2004-05 – Winners
- Mid District Cup 2003-04 – Winners
- Glamorgan County Silver Ball Trophy 1989-90 – Winners
- Mid District Cup 1970-71 – Winners

== Notable former players ==
=== Full Internationals ===
- Gareth Prothero (Wales and British Lions)
- Steve Fenwick (Wales and British Lions)
- Chris Bridges (Wales)
- Andrew Lamerton (Wales)
- Gareth Wyatt (Wales)
- Michael Owen (Wales and British Lions)
- Gemma Hallett (Wales Women)
- Gethin Jenkins (Wales and British Lions)
- Bradley Davies (Wales)
- Dillon Lewis (Wales)

=== Other internationals ===
- Tom Slater (Wales Sevens)
- Tom Riley (Wales Sevens)
- Brett Davey (Wales Development XV)
