= Narberth RFC =

Welsh rugby union club, based in Narberth

(Wales) Narberth RFC
- Full name: Narberth Rugby Football Club
- Nickname: The Otters
- Founded: 1882; 144 years ago
- Location: Narberth, Wales
- Ground: Lewis Lloyd Ground
- Chairman: Jon Dodds
- President: Dorian Phillips
- Coach: Ricky Guest
- League: Welsh Premiership
- 2025-2026: Welsh Premier Division, 11th
Team kit

Official website
- www.narberthrfc.org.uk

Narberth RFC are a Welsh rugby union club based in Narberth in Pembrokeshire. They are members of the Welsh Rugby Union playing in the WRU Championship and are a feeder club for the Scarlets. The Otters have won the Pembrokeshire County Cup competition.

== Notable former players ==
- (Wales) Brian Williams
