= Cyncoed =

Community in Cardiff, Wales

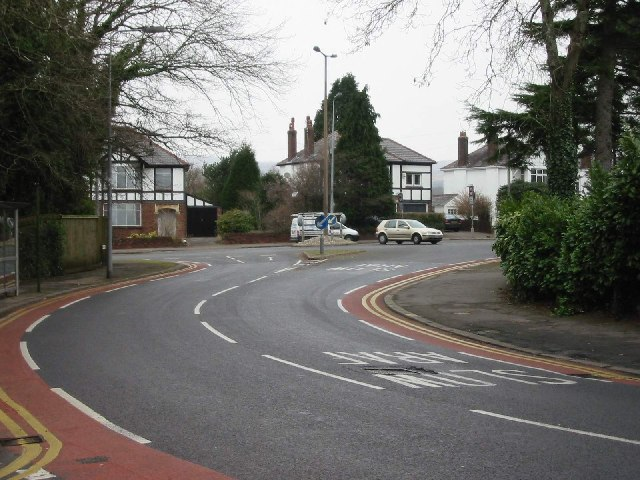
- Cyncoed Roundabout; Viewed from the top of Bettws y Coed Road looking towards the junction of Cyncoed Road and Rhyd y penau Road

- Location within Cardiff
- Population: 11,148 (2011)
- OS grid reference: ST183809
- Principal area: Cardiff
- Preserved county: South Glamorgan
- Country: Wales
- Sovereign state: United Kingdom
- Post town: CARDIFF
- Postcode district: CF23
- Dialling code: 029
- Police: South Wales
- Fire: South Wales
- Ambulance: Welsh
- UK Parliament: Cardiff East
- Senedd Cymru – Welsh Parliament: Cardiff Central
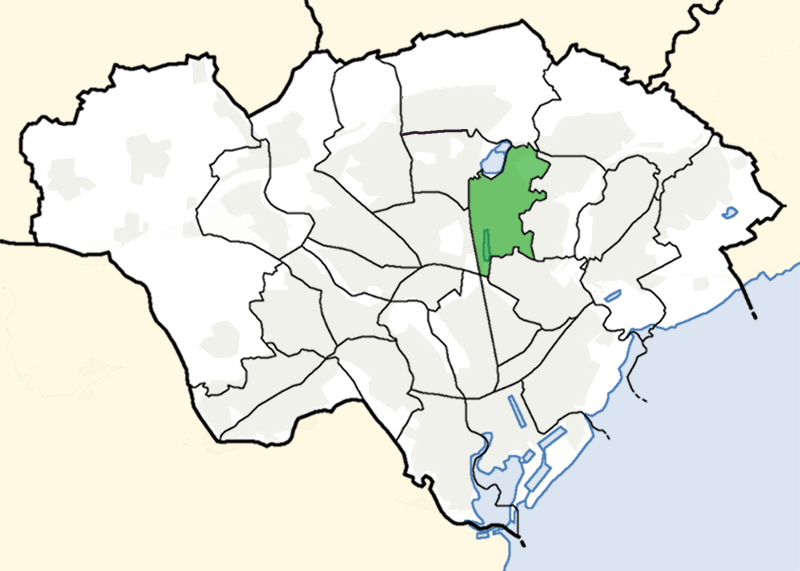
- List of places UK Wales Cardiff 51.519°N 3.163°W

Cyncoed (/kɪnˈkɔɪd/ kin-KOYD) is a community in the northeast of Cardiff, the capital of Wales. With many properties in the area fetching over £1 million, Cyncoed is considered to have some of the highest property prices in the country. Cyncoed overlooks the city centre of Cardiff, near Roath Park, with views of the surrounding mountains.

== Background and development ==
In 1887 John Crichton-Stuart, 3rd Marquess of Bute offered 121 acres (49 ha) of marshland to Cardiff Council, for use as a public park. In 1894, Roath Park was officially opened to the public. Work initially focused on creating the lake from an area of marshland. In 1915 a lighthouse was constructed in the lake containing a scale model of the 'Terra Nova' ship to commemorate Captain Scott's ill-fated voyage to the Antarctic from Cardiff in 1910. The park's atmosphere today still retains the Victorian elegance and has Conservation Area status.

In 1914, the council built Cefn Coed Road, which ran past the original (18th century, and still standing to this day), farmhouse, which allowed small builders to develop houses for coal merchants and exports who worked at the Coal Exchange.

Post World War I developers bought the farmland as Cardiff expanded rapidly, with high quality detached housing being built to access Cardiff Golf Club, which occupied land to the north, and The Cyncoed Tennis Club.

During World War II there was a US Army in the area. Post the war, in the 1950s this area was redeveloped as housing demand grew, and the rural nature of Cyncoed vanished forever, including the development of the Lakeside estate, centered on Celyn Avenue.

As of February 2022, Cyncoed had an average property price of £475,126.

== Description ==
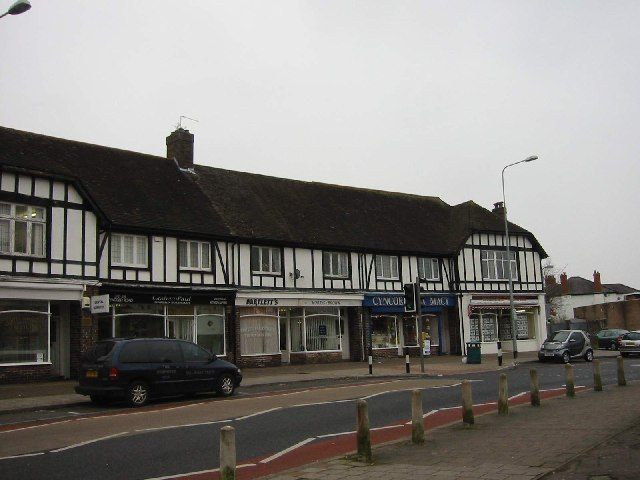
Part of the small conglomeration of shops in Cyncoed

Some of the older and larger properties have been demolished and replaced by smaller homes and supplemented with smaller semi-detached infill. Modern housing estates now surround the area. The surrounding communities are:

Llanishen	Lisvane	Pontprennau
Heath	Cyncoed	Pentwyn
Cathays	Roath	Penylan

Features include a small shopping village, a number of churches, and a synagogue because there is a sizable Jewish community living in Cyncoed. Cyncoed Medical Centre is actually just within neighbouring Pontprennau, on the road junction Cyncoed, Pontprennau and Pentwyn, to enable it to serve all three communities.

Between Cyncoed and Llanishen lie two defunct reservoirs. The company which owned this site, Western Power Distribution, intended to build houses on Llanishen Reservoir. Local residents campaigned for 15 years to stop the development. Eventually the reservoirs were sold to the steelworks and put back to their intended purpose of steelmaking. The reservoirs have recently been devolved back to the Welsh Water authority which, after draining and structural inspection, has returned both to public amenity use.

== Education ==
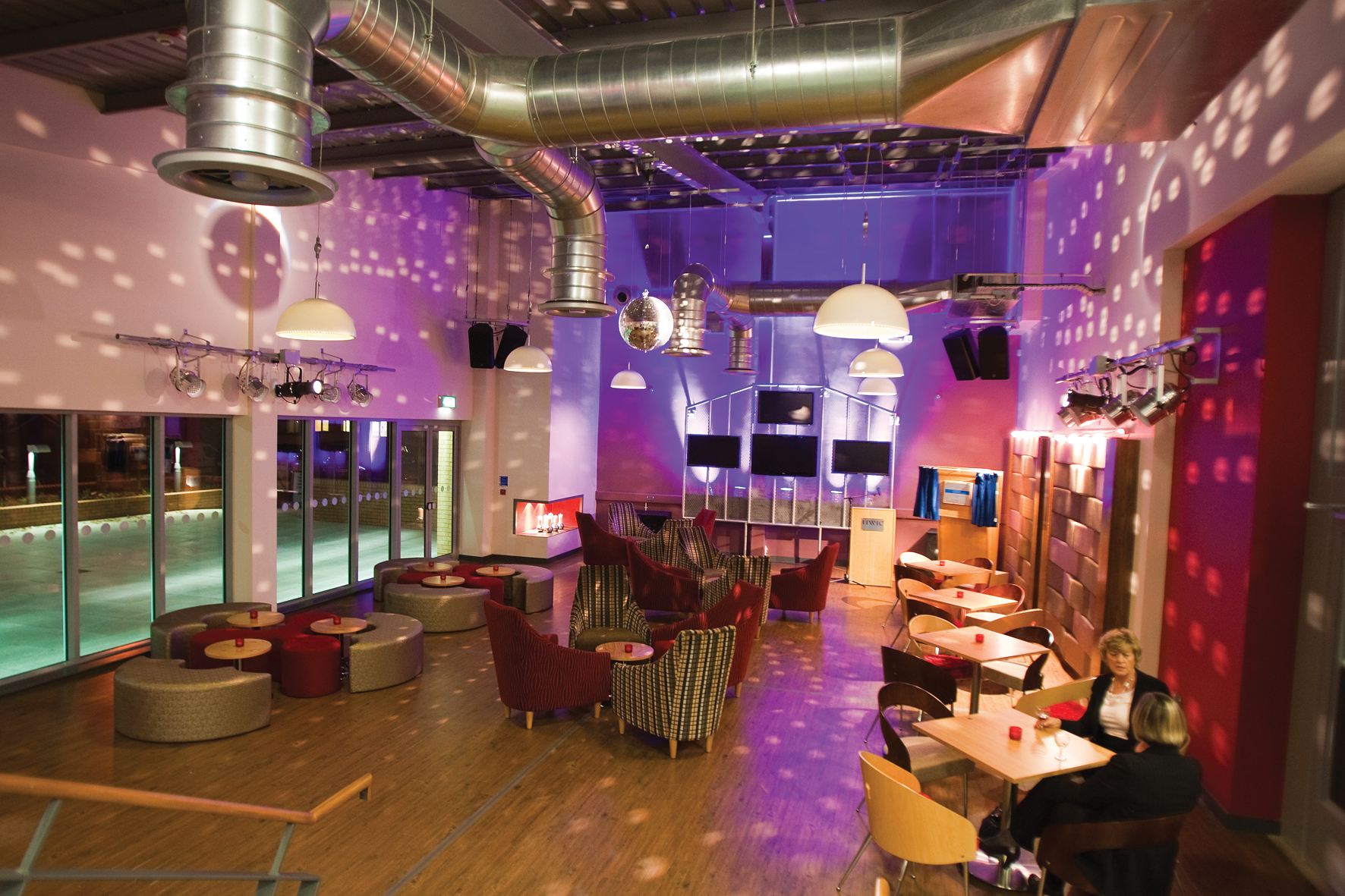
The students union of the Cyncoed campus of Cardiff Metropolitan University

Primary schools and secondary schools provide local education. Rhydypenau Primary School serves most of Cyncoed. There is also Lakeside Primary School which was built on Ontario Way, and Cardiff High School (used to be called 'Ty Celyn') which serves a large proportion of Cardiff's teenagers. It was built on the site of Celyn Farm, located towards Roath Park. There are campuses of Cardiff Metropolitan University and a Cardiff University hall of residence also in the vicinity.

As well as a modern hall of residence for Cardiff University, in 1961 the Cardiff College of Education providing teacher training opened. Various courses are now taught on the Cyncoed campus of Cardiff Metropolitan University, but it is most famous for its physical education department which has produced various sportspeople from its students, including: Dai Davies; Lynn Davies; Gareth Edwards; Clive Griffiths; Greg Thomas; Steve Watkin. As well as top football team Cardiff Metropolitan University F.C. who compete in the Welsh Premier League.

== Rhydypennau library ==
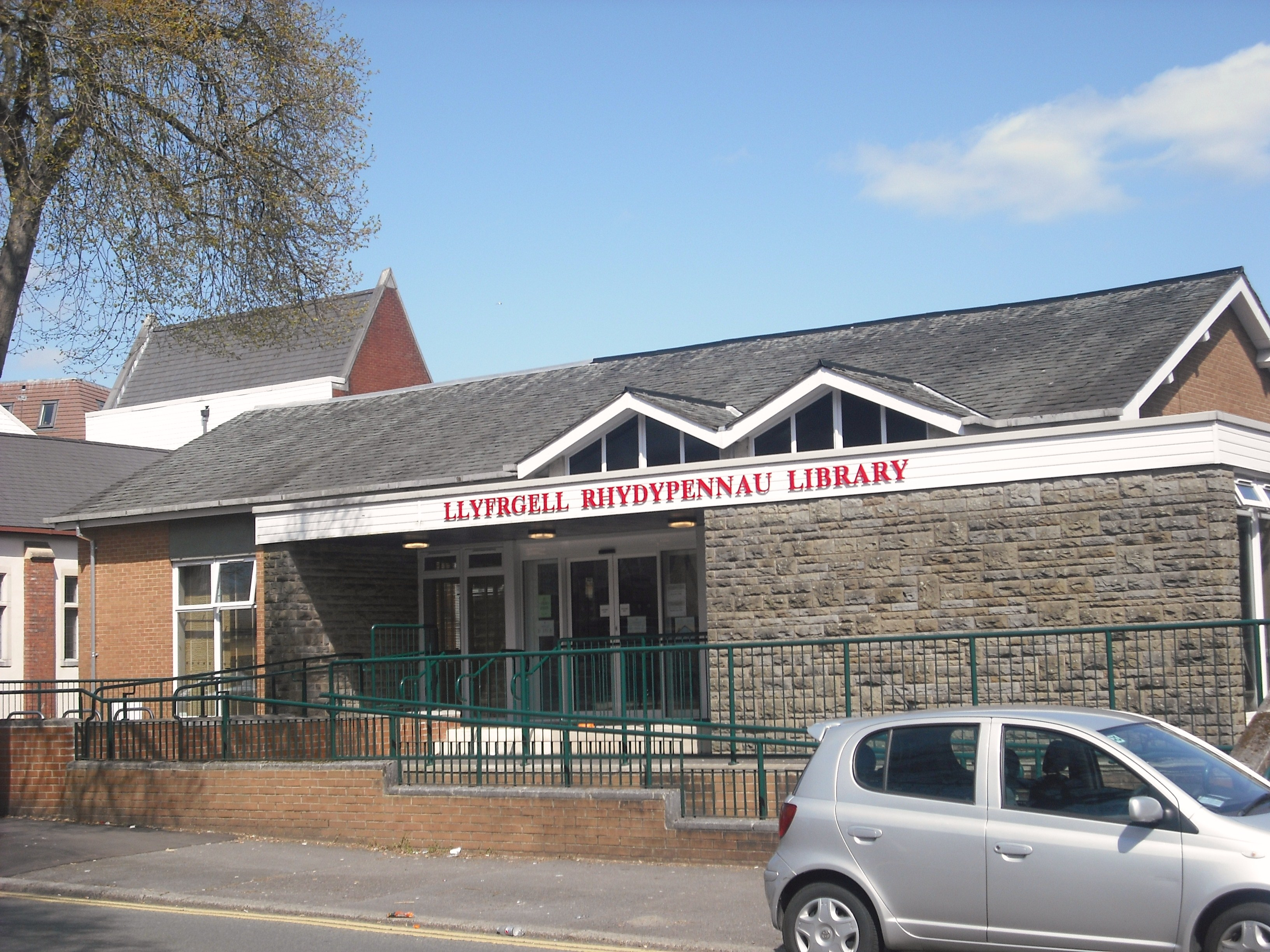
Rhydypennau Library

Rhydypennau Library (Welsh: Llyfrgell Rhydypennau) is situated near Cardiff High School. Refurbished in 2006–2007, modifications to the entrance included installing automatic doors and replacing existing ramps. New windows were also fitted and fascia boards were replaced. Accessible facilities for disabled people were introduced.

There are 4 PCs with free public Internet access and 1 PC in the children's section. Storytime for pre-school children followed by craft activities, and rhymetime for babies and toddlers are organised by the library.

== Electoral ward ==
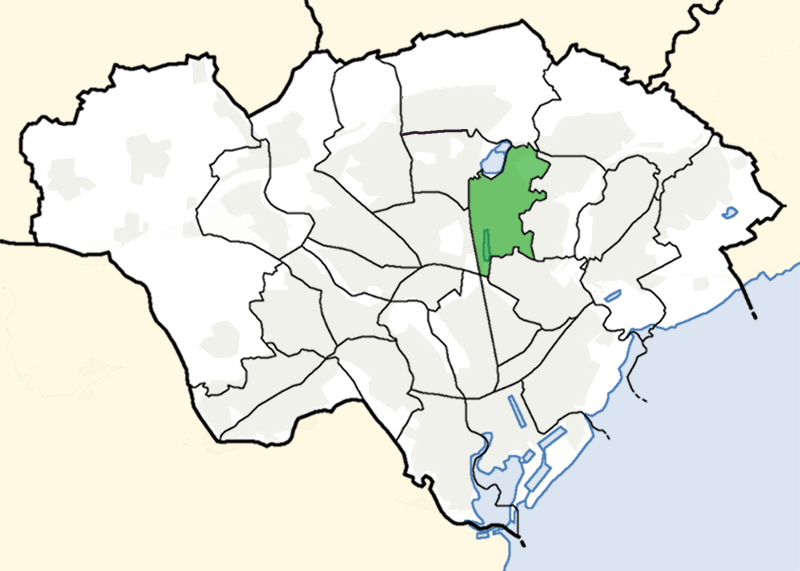
Cyncoed electoral ward of Cardiff

Cyncoed is both an electoral ward, and a community without a community council in Cardiff. The electoral ward is within the UK parliamentary constituency of Cardiff East and Senedd constituency of Cardiff Central. It is bounded by Llanishen to the northwest; Lisvane to the north; Pentwyn to the east; Penylan and Plasnewydd to the south; and Heath to the west. It is represented by three councillors on Cardiff Council. There have been three Liberal Democrat Councillors since the early 1990s with the sole exception of between 2017 and 2022 when there were two Liberal Democrats and one Conservative Councillor.

== Transport ==
Cyncoed is served by Cardiff Bus services 28, 28A, 28B, 51, 52 and 53 to and from the city centre. Heath High Level and Heath Low Level railway stations are 0.6 miles (1 km) southwest.

Cyncoed Road runs through Cyncoed, served by Cardiff Bus routes 51 and 53 connect the outer suburbs to the inner city with links to Lakeside, Roath and the city centre. The 28, 28A and 28B continues to Llanishen and Thornhill. Some western parts of the area have access to Heath Low Level railway station, with services northbound to Coryton on the City Line. Heath High Level station is nearby, on the Rhymney Line with services northbound to Rhymney via Lisvane & Thornhill and Caerphily. Both lines have services southbound to Cardiff Queen Street and Cardiff Central railway station.

Celyn Avenue leads west to Heath and Cyncoed Road leads north to Pontprennau and south to Cathays, the city centre, Roath and Penylan.

== Notable residents ==
- The poet Gillian Clarke lived there for many years.
