= Beddau =

Coordinates: 51.5560°N 3.3577°W

Beddau: Welsh: Y Beddau
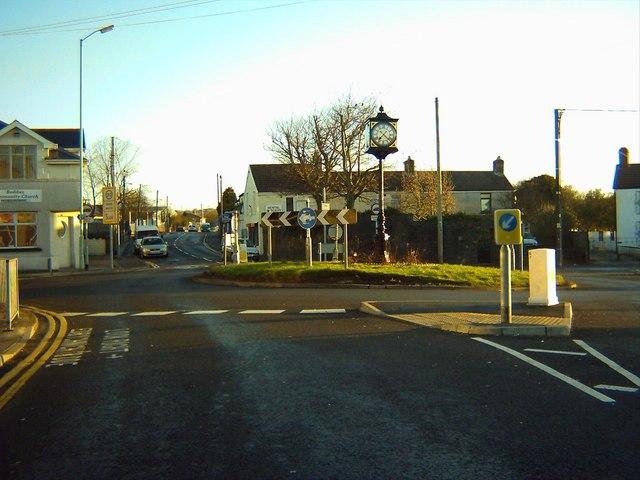
- Beddau Square

- Location within Rhondda Cynon Taf
- Population: 4,156 (2011 Ward)
- Community: Llantrisant
- Principal area: Rhondda Cynon Taf
- Preserved county: Mid Glamorgan
- Country: Wales
- Sovereign state: United Kingdom
- Post town: PONTYPRIDD
- Postcode district: CF38
- Dialling code: 01443
- Police: South Wales
- Fire: South Wales
- Ambulance: Welsh
- UK Parliament: Pontypridd
- Senedd Cymru – Welsh Parliament: Pontypridd

Beddau (Welsh for 'Graves'; Welsh: Y Beddau) is a large former mining village (and electoral ward) situated within the South Wales Valleys around 1.5 miles (2.4 km) from Llantrisant and 4 miles (6.4 km) from the larger town of Pontypridd in the county borough of Rhondda Cynon Taf, South Wales.

== Governance ==
Beddau was also the name of a county borough electoral ward within the Llantrisant community, bordered to the east by the Tyn-y-nant ward, which included Tynant. The Beddau ward elected a county councillor to Rhondda Cynon Taf County Borough Council. Apart from 2008 to 2012, when the ward elected an independent councillor, the ward has been represented by the Labour Party. Since 2012 the ward was represented by Councillor Ricky Yeo. The county councillor for the Tyn-y-Nant ward was Labour's Clayton Willis.

A 2018 review of electoral arrangements by the Local Democracy and Boundary Commission for Wales would see Beddau and Tyn-y-nant merged to form a single county ward. The proposals would take effect from the 2022 council elections.

Beddau is also a ward for Llantrisant Community Council, electing four community councillors. Tynant forms another community ward, electing three councillors to the community council.

== Education ==
Ysgol Gynradd Gymraeg Castellau is the village's Welsh speaking primary school. As of July 2016, it is a school to 256 children. English language medium schools are Gwaunmeisgyn Primary School and Llwyncrwn Primary School, which both feed into Beddau's secondary school Bryn Celynnog Comprehensive School.

== Sport ==
Beddau is notable for its exported rugby union talent. Neil Jenkins, Michael Owen and Gethin Jenkins are former pupils of Bryn Celynnog Comprehensive, and Gemma Hallett a former pupil of the Welsh School in Llanharry, all grew up in Beddau and played for the Welsh Rugby Union. Darts has also been represented well in the village, seeing 3 residents all selected for the Welsh Team. Ian Phillips, Ross Robson and Cavan Phillips have all represented the Welsh Darts Organisation in the British internationals and Europe cups (Youth for Ross 2008/9 and Cavan 2014/15/16)

Beddau fields a rugby union team, Beddau RFC, as well as its own football team, Cwm Welfare A.F.C.

== Transport ==
Beddau is served by bus services to Llantrisant, Cardiff and Pontypridd.

A station, Beddau Halt railway station on the Llantrisant and Taff Vale Junction Railway existed until 1964 quite some way south of the village. A private railway siding from the Treferig branch of the Llantrisant and Taff Vale Junction Railway to coal workings extended to the village existed for a time. Extensive sidings and rail traffic served Cwm Colliery and coking works until 1984 when the line to junction at Pontyclun station was closed and mothballed. Efforts are being made to reopen this line to passenger traffic.

== Notable residents ==
- Angela Hui, journalist and author, born and raised in Beddau
- Adrian Lewis Morgan, actor known for his role as Dr. Jimmi Clay in the BBC soap opera Doctors, was born in Beddau.

== Bibliography ==
- Davies, John; Jenkins, Nigel (2008). The Welsh Academy Encyclopaedia of Wales. Cardiff: University of Wales Press. ISBN 978-0-7083-1953-6.
