= Bargoed RFC =

Welsh rugby union club, based in Bargoed

(Wales) Bargoed RFC
- Full name: Bargoed Rugby Football Club
- Nickname(s): The Bulls, The Blues
- Founded: 1882; 144 years ago
- Location: Bargoed, Wales
- Ground(s): Bargoed Park (Capacity 1500 seated, 2500 standing)
- Chairman: Neil Carter
- Coach(es): 1st XV : Jeremy Rogers (Director of Rugby), Jack Condy ( Head Coach), Anthony Lott (Coach), Gareth Richards (Coach), Adam Powell (Coach), Strphen Rose (Coach), Brett Wakefield ( Team Manager) 2nd XV : Gary Williams, Matthew Hutcheon, Gareth McCarthy, Brian Jeremiah
- Captain: Keiron Brown
- League: Welsh Premier Division
- 2024-2025: Welsh Premiership - 4th
Team kit

Official website
- www.bargoedrfc.co.uk

Bargoed Rugby Football Club is a rugby union team from the town of Bargoed in South Wales. They are members of the Welsh Rugby Union and are a feeder club for Newport Gwent Dragons. The club holds the record for the number of points achieved in one season at Championship level and are Currently playing in the Admiral Premiership.

At the end of the 2023-2024 season Bargoed completed the "Double" winning both the Admiral Championship League and the Championship Cup. The Bulls beat Ystrad Rhonnda at the Principality Stadium in a resounding 65-12 win.

Bargoed got their hands on another Championship League trophy in 2022 and narrowly lost to Neath RFC in the Championship Cup Final at the Principality Stadium.

In 2024 the club signed former Wales International Tom James.

In 2005 Bargoed RFC received the recognition of being awarded Rugby World Magazine UK team of the year after winning 55 games in a row. This form helped them climb the leagues and they were crowned Championship Champions. In December 2015 the WRU granted Bargoed an A Licence meaning a top four finish would secure Premiership rugby for the first time which was achieved in 2016–17.

The 2016–17 season was the club's first in the Premiership.

The club has 16 Teams within the club, including teams from the Mini and Junior Section, a Youth Side, 2nd Team and 1st Team. The club has produced many talented players who came up through the club development system. Some of these key players are : Anthony Lott, Steffan Jones, Jonathan Evans, Dafydd Carter (Age Grade International), Grant Rogers (Age Grade International), Alex Herbert (Age Grade International) as of many more.

== Notable past players ==
See also Category:Bargoed RFC players

- (Wales) John Mantle (2 caps)
- (Wales) Cliff Williams (2 caps)
- (Wales) Steffan Jones (Bedford Blues)
- (Wales) Jonathan Evans
- (Wales) Lee Beach
- (Wales) Ben Fry (rugby union)
