= Cardiff Metropolitan University RFC =

Welsh rugby union football club

(Wales) Cardiff Metropolitan RFC
- Full name: Cardiff Metropolitan University RFC
- Nickname: The Archers
- Location: Cardiff, Wales
- Ground: Cyncoed Campus (Capacity: 1620)
- President: W. P. Davies
- Coach(es): Daniel Milton, Ian 'Gards Boy' Gardener, Alun 'Big Al' Williams, Tom Cole, Justin Thomas, Geraint Lewis
- League: Welsh Premier Division BUCS Super Rugby
- 2024–2025: Welsh Premier Division – 9th BUCS Super Rugby – 6th
Team kit

Cardiff Metropolitan University Rugby Football Club (aka Cardiff Met RFC) is a Welsh rugby union team currently playing in the Welsh Premiership and the top tier of University rugby based on Cyncoed Campus at Cardiff Metropolitan University.

== Notable former players ==
Inclusion criteria: Attained international caps

- (Wales) Mathew Back
- (Wales) Roy Bergiers
- (Wales) John Bevan
- (Wales) David Bryant
- (Wales) Nathan Budgett
- (Wales) Gareth Cooper
- (Wales) Tony Copsey
- (Wales) Sam Cross
- (Wales) John Davies
- (Wales) Lyn Davies
- (Wales) Stuart Davies
- (Wales) Dominic Day
- (Wales) John Devereux
- (Wales) Gareth Edwards
- (Wales) Ben Evans
- (Wales) Tony Gray
- (Wales) Clive Griffiths
- (Philippines) Gareth Holgate
- (Wales) Kevin Hopkins

- (Wales) Jonathan Humphreys
- (Scotland) Stuart Jardine
- (Wales) John Jeffery
- (Wales) Keri Jones
- (Wales) Ryan Jones
- (Wales) Steve Jones
- (Wales) Les Keen
- (Wales) Stuart Lane
- (Wales) Geraint Lewis
- (Wales) Rhodri Lewis
- (Wales) John Lloyd
- (Wales) Allan Martin
- (Scotland) Shaun Mcgaughie
- (Wales) Robert Morgan
- (Wales) Haydn Morris
- (Wales) David Nash
- (England) Luke Northmore

- (Wales) David Richards
- (Wales) Clive Rowlands
- (Wales) Clive Shell
- (England) Colin Smart
- (Wales) Denzil Thomas
- (Wales) Justin Thomas
- (Wales) T. Rhys Thomas
- (Wales) Gerry Wallace
- (Wales) Billy Watkins
- (Wales) Geoff Whitsun
- (Wales) Brynmor Williams
- (Wales) Gareth John Williams
- (Wales) Gareth Powell Williams
- (Wales) J. J. Williams
- (Wales) Ray Williams
- (Wales) Alex Cuthbert
- (England) Alex Dombrandt
- (England) Harry Paul
- (England) Tom Pearson
- (England) Jacob Newnam
- (Wales) Matthew Osborne
- (Pakistan) Matthew "Marshy" Marsh

== Club honours ==
- Glamorgan County Silver Ball Trophy 1968-69 – Winners
- Glamorgan County Silver Ball Trophy 1969-70 – Winners
- WRU Division One East 2009/10 – Champions
