= List of Welsh rugby union clubs =

Rugby union in Wales is governed by the Welsh Rugby Union. The top level of Welsh rugby is represented by the regional sides, formed in 2003, who play in the United Rugby Championship (formerly the Celtic League, Pro12 or Pro14). Originally consisting of five teams, there are currently four regional sides in the United Rugby Championship, after the Celtic Warriors were wound up in 2004.

Below these teams is the Super Rygbi Cymru, then the Welsh Premiership, the Welsh Championship split between east and west, then Leagues 1-6 which are also split geographically into further areas.

== United Rugby Championship ==
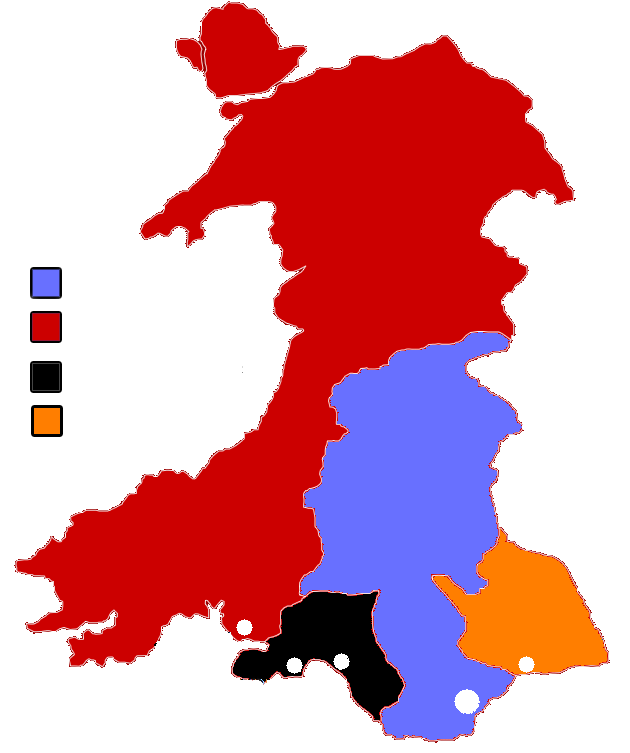
The 4 Welsh Rugby Union Regions of Wales

- Cardiff Rugby
- Dragons
- Ospreys
- Scarlets

== Super Rygbi Cymru ==
- Aberavon
- Bridgend Ravens
- Cardiff
- Carmarthen Quins
- Ebbw Vale
- Llandovery
- Newport
- Pontypool
- RGC 1404
- Swansea

== Welsh Premiership ==
- Bargoed
- Beddau
- Brecon
- Cardiff Metropolitan University
- Cross Keys
- Llanelli Wanderers
- Llangennech
- Merthyr
- Narberth
- Neath
- Newbridge
- Pontypridd
- Ystrad Rhondda

== Welsh Championship ==
=== Welsh Championship East ===
- Aberdare RFC
- Abertillery / Blaenau Gwent RFC
- Bedwas RFC
- Bridgend Athletic RFC
- Glamorgan Wanderers RFC
- Mountain Ash RFC
- Penalta RFC
- Rumney RFC
- St Joseph's RFC
- St Peter's RFC
- Talywain RFC
- Treorchy RFC
- Ynysddu RFC

=== Welsh Championship West ===
- Aberystwyth RFC
- Ammanford RFC
- Bonymaen RFC
- Clwb Rygbi Crymych RFC
- Dunvant RFC
- Glynneath RFC
- Gorseinion RFC
- Gowerton RFC
- Kenfig Hill RFC
- Newcastle Emlyn RFC
- Tata Steel RFC
- Tondu RFC
- Trebanos RFC

== Welsh Division 1 ==
=== Division 1 East ===
- Abergavenny RFC
- Bedlinog RFC
- Blaina RFC
- Blackwood RFC
- Brynmawr RFC
- Dowlais RFC
- Monmouth RFC
- Nelson RFC
- Newport HSOB RFC

=== Division 1 East Central ===
- Abercwmboi RFC
- Abercynon RFC
- Barry RFC
- Caerphilly RFC
- Cambrian Welfare RFC
- Llanharan RFC
- Llanishen RFC
- Penarth RFC
- Rhydyfelin RFC
- St Albans RFC

=== Division 1 West ===
- Burry Port RFC
- Felinfoel RFC
- Kidwelly RFC
- Lampeter Town RFC
- Laugharne RFC
- St. Clears RFC
- Swansea Uplands RFC
- Tenby United RFC
- Waunarlwydd RFC
- Yr Hendy RFC

=== Division 1 West Central ===
- Abercrave RFC
- Aberavon Green Stars RFC
- Builth Wells RFC
- Heol y Cyw RFC
- Maesteg Harlequins RFC
- Nantyffyllon RFC
- Skewen RFC
- Vardre RFC
- Ystalyfera RFC
- Ystradgynlais RFC

=== Division 1 North ===
- Bala RFC
- Bethesda RFC
- Caernarfon RFC
- Clwb Rygbi Rhuthun
- COBRA
- Colwyn Bay RFC
- Llandudno RFC
- Llangefni RFC
- Nant Conwy RFC
- Pwllheli RFC
- Welshpool RFC
- Wrexham RFC

== Welsh League 2 ==
=== League 2 East ===
- Abercarn RFC
- Caldicot RFC
- Croesyceiliog RFC
- Cwmbran RFC
- Newport Saracens RFC
- Pill Harriers RFC
- Pontypool United RFC
- Rhymney RFC
- Senghenydd RFC
- Usk RFC

=== League 2 East Central ===
- Cardiff Quins
- Cilfynydd RFC
- Cowbridge RFC
- Gilfach Goch RFC
- Llantwit Fardre RFC
- Pentyrch RFC
- Taffs Well RFC
- Ynysybwl RFC

=== League 2 West ===
- Betws RFC
- Carmarthen Athletic RFC
- Fishguard and Goodwick RFC
- Loughor RFC
- Milford Haven RFC
- Nantgaredig RFC
- Whitland RFC

=== League 2 West Central ===
- Aberavon Quins RFC
- Abercrave RFC
- Brynamman RFC
- Bryncethin RFC
- Heol y Cyw RFC
- Maesteg Celtic RFC
- Mumbles RFC
- Pencoed RFC
- Porthcawl RFC
- Resolven RFC
- South Gower RFC

=== League 2 North ===
- Abergele RFC
- Caernarfon RFC Athletic
- Dolgellau RFC
- Machynlleth RFC
- Nant Conwy RFC Athletic
- Newtown RFC
- Rhyl and District RFC

== Welsh League 3 ==
=== League 3 East ===
- Caerleon RFC
- Chepstow RFC
- Fleur de Lys RFC
- Garndiffaith RFC
- Gwernyfed RFC
- Machen RFC
- Nantyglo RFC
- New Panteg RFC
- Risca RFC
- RTB Ebbw Vale RFC

=== League 3 East Central ===
- Canton RFC
- Clwb Rygbi Cymry Caerdydd RFC
- Fairwater RFC
- Llandaff RFC
- Llantrisant RFC
- Llantwit Major RFC
- Penygraig RFC
- Tonyrefail RFC
- Treharris RFC
- Wattstown RFC

=== League 3 West ===
- Aberaeron RFC
- Amman United RFC
- Cardigan RFC
- Cefneithin RFC
- Haverfordwest RFC
- Llandeilo RFC
- Llangadog RFC
- Pontyberem RFC
- Tumble RFC
- Tycroes RFC

=== League 3 West Central ===
- Baglan RFC
- Bridgend Sports Club RFC
- Bryncoch RFC
- Cefn Cribbwr RFC
- Cwmavon RFC
- Nantymoel RFC
- Neath Athletic RFC
- Tonmawr RFC
- Tonna RFC

=== League 3 North East ===
- Bro Gwernant RFC
- Clwb Rygbi Rhuthun Athletic
- COBRA Athletic
- Dinbych RFC Athletic
- Flint RFC
- Llanidloes RFC
- Mold RFC Athletic
- Rhosllanerchrugog RFC
- Wrexham RFC Athletic

=== League 3 North West ===
- Bala RFC Athletic
- Bangor RFC
- Bethesda RFC Athletic
- Bro Ffestiniog RFC
- Colwyn Bay RFC Athletic
- Llangefni RFC Athletic
- Menai Bridge RFC
- Porthmadog
- Pwllheli RFC Athletic

== Welsh League 4 ==
=== League 4 East ===
- Abertysswg Falcons RFC
- Bedwellty RFC
- Crickhowell RFC
- Crumlin RFC
- Deri RFC
- Llanhilleth RFC
- Oakdale RFC
- Pontllanfraith RFC
- Tredegar Ironsides RFC
- Whiteheads RFC

=== League 4 East Central ===
- Brackla RFC
- Cardiff Saracens RFC
- Dinas Powys RFC
- Ferndale RFC
- Llandaff North RFC
- Old Illtydians RFC
- Pontyclun RFC
- Treherbert RFC
- Tylorstown RFC
- Ynysowen RFC

=== League 4 West Central ===
- Alltwen RFC
- Briton Ferry RFC
- Crynant (Creunant) RFC
- Cwmgors RFC
- Glais RFC
- Maesteg RFC
- Pontardawe RFC
- Pontrhydyfen RFC
- Rhigos RFC
- Seven Sisters RFC

=== League 4 West A ===
- Clwb Rygbi Crymych RFC Athletic
- Llangwm RFC
- Llanybydder RFC
- Narberth RFC Athletic
- Newcastle Emlyn RFC Athletic
- Neyland RFC
- Pembroke Dock Harlequins RFC
- Pembroke RFC
- St. Davids RFC

=== League 4 West B ===
- Bynea RFC
- Fall Bay RFC
- Furnace United RFC
- Llandybie RFC
- New Dock Stars RFC
- Pantyffynon RFC
- Penybanc RFC
- Pontyates RFC
- Tregaron RFC
- Trimsaran RFC

== Welsh League 5 ==
=== League 5 East ===
- Abersychan Alexanders RFC
- Bargoed Athletic RFC
- Beaufort RFC
- Bettws RFC (Newport)
- Blackwood Stars RFC
- Forgeside RFC
- Hafodyrynys RFC
- Hartridge RFC
- Hollybush RFC
- Trinant DFC

=== League 5 East Central ===
- Caerau Ely RFC
- Cefn Coed RFC
- Llandrindod Wells RFC
- Ogmore Vale RFC
- Old Penarthians RFC
- Pontycymmer RFC
- Tref-Y-Clawdd RFC

=== League 5 West Central ===
- Banwen RFC
- Bonymaen RFC Athletic
- Cwmgwrach RFC
- Cwmllynfell RFC
- Cwmtwrch RFC
- Dunvant RFC Athletic
- Glyncorrwg RFC
- Penlan RFC
- Pyle RFC
- Taibach RFC

== Welsh League 6 ==
=== League 6 East Central ===
- Brecon RFC Athletic
- Bridgend Athletic RFC 2nd XV
- Cardiff Met RFC Athletic
- Rumney RFC Athletic
- St Peters RFC Athletic
- Tondu RFC Athletic

=== League 6 East A ===
- Brynithel RFC
- Girling RFC
- Hirwaun RFC
- Magor RFC
- New Tredegar RFC
- Old Tylerian RFC
- Penallta Athletic RFC
- St Julians HSOB RFC

=== League 6 East B ===
- Cardiff Internationals RFC
- Glyncoch RFC
- Llanrumney RFC
- Sully View RFC
- Whitchurch RFC

== Women's Competitions ==
=== Premiership ===
- Bonymaen Ladies
- Burry Port Women
- Caereinion OBRA Women's
- Caernarfon Women's RFC
- Llandaff North Women RFC
- Pontyclun Women RFC
- Seven Sisters Women RFC
- Whitland Women RFC

=== Championship ===
- Clwb Rygbi Cymry Caerdydd Women
- Gwernyfed Women RFC
- Haverfordwest Women's RFC
- Lampeter Town Ladies
- Llantwit Fardre Women's
- Old Penarthians Women
- Porthcawl Women RFC
- Ynysddu Women RFC

=== East Wales League ===
- Blackwood RFC
- Dowlais Women's RFC
- Ebbw Vale RFC
- Newport HSOB
- Senghenydd Women RFC

=== West Wales League ===
- Morriston Women
- Newcastle Emlyn Womens
- Pembroke Women's RFC
- Tondu Women's
- Tumble Women RFC
- West Swansea Hawks Women's

=== North Wales League ===
- Abergele RFC Women's
- Holyhead RFC Women's
- Llangefni RFC Women's
- Wrexham RFC Womens

=== Central Division ===
- Abercwmboi RFC
- Penygraig RFC
- Taffs Well Women RFC
- Treorchy RFC
- Whitchurch Women RFC
- Ynysybwl RFC

== See also ==
- United Rugby Championship
- Principality Premiership
