= 2015–16 WRU League 1 East =

2015–16 SWALEC League 1 East
- Countries: Wales
- Date: 5 September 2015 – 17 May 2016
- Champions: Bedlinog (1st title)
- Relegated: Blackwood
- Matches played: 132

The 2015–16 SWALEC League 1 East was the second season of the new format of the WRU National Leagues. Previously, League 1 was the second tier of club rugby in Wales but since the creation of the WRU National Championship, League 1 is now the third tier. The competition was won by Bedlinog and the bottom team, Blackwood were relegated for a second consecutive year following relegation from last season's Championship.

== Structure ==
Each team in the league will play each other twice on a home and away basis for a total of 22 matches played each. Points will be awarded in accordance to the standard scoring system in rugby union - 4 points for a win, 2 points for a draw and 0 for a loss. Teams will also be awarded 1 additional bonus point for scoring 4 or more tries in a match or losing by 7 points or less in a match. The team with the most points at the end of the season will be declared the winners. This season sees the absence of a play-off with the winners of League 1 East Central to determine promotion. The champion clubs will instead be promoted automatically to the 2016-17 WRU Championship. As both teams relegated from this season's Championship were not geographically "East" then only the bottom side was relegated from League 1 East. If either team was geographically "East" then the bottom two clubs would be relegated from League 1 East.

=== Teams ===
Having lost last season's promotion playoff, last season's Champions Penallta remained in the league. Garndiffaith and Fluer De Lys were relegated to League 2 East. At the end of last season, Blackwood were relegated from the Championship to League 1 East. Last season's League 2 East Champions Nantyglo and runners-up Brynmawr were promoted to the league.

To allow for optimum participation between teams in the league, clubs were swapped between League 1 East and East Central based on geographical location. This saw; Cardiff HSOB, Glamorgan Wanderers, Llanishen, Rhiwbina and Rumney move to League 1 East Central and Bedlinog, Rhydyfelin, Ynysybwl and League 2 East Central Champions Brecon move to League 1 East.

The teams are:

- Bedlinog
- Blackwood
- Blaenavon
- Brecon
- Brynmawr
- Nantyglo
- Nelson
- Penallta
- Rhydyfelin
- Risca
- Senghenydd
- Ynysybwl
