= 2016–17 WRU Division 1 East =

2016–17 National Division 1 East
- Countries: Wales
- Date: 3 September 2016 – 13 May 2017
- Champions: Rhydyfelin (1st title)
- Relegated: Nantyglo; Senghenydd
- Matches played: 132

The 2016–17 WRU National Division 1 East was the third season of the new format of the WRU National Leagues. Previously, League 1 was the second tier of club rugby in Wales but since the creation of the WRU National Championship, League 1 is now the third tier. The league was won by Rhydyfelin and the bottom two clubs relegated to League 2 East were Nantyglo and Senghenydd.

== Structure ==
Each team in the league will play each other twice on a home and away basis for a total of 22 matches played each. Points will be awarded in accordance to the standard scoring system in rugby union - 4 points for a win, 2 points for a draw and 0 for a loss. Teams will also be awarded 1 additional bonus point for scoring 4 or more tries in a match or losing by 7 points or less in a match. The team with the most points at the end of the season will be declared the winners. This season sees the return of the promotion play-off whereby the winning club will enter a play-off with the winner of Division 1 East Central to determine which club is to be promoted to the 2017-18 WRU Championship.

=== Teams ===
Last season's Champions Bedlinog were promoted to the Championship from League 1 East and bottom club Blackwood were relegated to Division 2 East. Last season's League 2 East Champions Abertillery Blaenau Gwent and runners-up Caerleon were promoted to the league.

The teams are:

- Abertillery Blaenau Gwent
- Blaenavon
- Brecon
- Brynmawr
- Caerleon
- Nantyglo
- Nelson
- Penallta
- Rhydyfelin
- Risca
- Senghenydd
- Ynysybwl

== Promotion play-off ==
The winners of both 1 East (Rhydyfelin) and 1 East Central (Treorchy) would play-off on a home and away basis to determine which club would be promoted. The winner would be the club who scores more points on aggregate.

6 May 2017
14:30

Rhydyfelin	42 – 24	Treorchy

Recreation Ground

13 May 2017
14:30

Treorchy	13 – 10	Rhydyfelin

The Oval

Rhydyfelin win 52-37 on aggregate and are promoted to the Championship.
