= 2014–15 WRU League 1 East =

2014–15 SWALEC League 1 East
- Countries: Wales
- Date: 6 September 2014 – 9 May 2015
- Champions: Penallta (1st title)
- Relegated: Garndiffaith; Fleur De Lys
- Matches played: 132

The 2014–15 SWALEC League 1 East was the first season of the new format of the WRU National Leagues. Previously, League 1 was the second tier of club rugby in Wales but since the creation of the WRU National Championship, League 1 is now the third tier. The new structure of the National Leagues also sees the creation of two new League 1 divisions (League 1 East Central and League 1 West Central) bringing the total number of League 1 divisions to five. The league was won by Penallta and the bottom two clubs relegated to League 2 East were Garndiffaith and Fleur De Lys.

== Structure ==
Each team in the league will play each other twice on a home and away basis for a total of 22 matches played each. Points will be awarded in accordance to the standard scoring system in rugby union - 4 points for a win, 2 points for a draw and 0 for a loss. Teams will also be awarded 1 additional bonus point for scoring 4 or more tries in a match or losing by 7 points or less in a match. The team with the most points at the end of the season will be declared the winners. The winning club will enter a play-off with the winner of League 1 East Central to determine which club is to be promoted to the 2015-16 WRU Championship.

=== Teams ===
- Blaenavon
- Cardiff HSOB
- Fleur De Lys
- Garndiffaith
- Glamorgan Wanderers
- Llanishen
- Nelson
- Penallta
- Rhiwbina
- Risca
- Rumney
- Senghenydd

== Promotion play-off ==
The winners of both 1 East (Penallta) and 1 East Central (Beddau) would play-off at a neutral venue to determine which club would be promoted. The game was to be played at Taff's Well's ground, Maes Gwyn.

16 May 2015
14:30

Beddau	22 – 13	Penallta

Maes Gwyn

Beddau are promoted to the Championship.
