= WRU League 2 East =

Rugby union league in Wales

WRU Division Two East
- Founded: 1995
- No. of teams: 12
- Country: Wales
- Most recent champion: Talywain RFC (2022-23)
- Level on pyramid: 4
- Promotion to: WRU League 1 East
- Relegation to: WRU Division Three East, WRU Division Three South East
- Website: www.wru.co.uk/eng/club/swalecleagues/index.php

The Welsh Rugby Union League 2 East (also called the SWALEC League 2 East for sponsorship reasons) is a rugby union league in Wales.

== Competition format and sponsorship ==
=== Competition ===
There are 12 clubs in the WRU League 2 East. During the course of a season (which lasts from September to May) each club plays the others twice, once at their home ground and once at that of their opponents for a total of 22 games for each club, with a total of 132 games in each season. Teams receive four points for a win and two point for a draw, an additional bonus point is awarded to either team if they score four tries or more in a single match. No points are awarded for a loss though the losing team can gain a bonus point for finishing the match within seven points of the winning team. Teams are ranked by total points, then the number of tries scored and then points difference. At the end of each season, the club with the most points is crowned as champion. If points are equal the tries scored then points difference determines the winner. The team who is declared champion at the end of the season is eligible for promotion to the WRU League 1 East. The three lowest placed teams are relegated into the WRU Division Three East or WRU Division Three South East depending on geographical location.

=== Sponsorship ===
In 2008 the Welsh Rugby Union announced a new sponsorship deal for the club rugby leagues with SWALEC valued at £1 million (GBP). The initial three year sponsorship was extended at the end of the 2010/11 season, making SWALEC the league sponsors until 2015. The leagues sponsored are the WRU Divisions one through to seven.

- (2002-2005) Lloyds TSB
- (2005-2008) Asda
- (2008-2015) SWALEC

== 2011/2012 Season ==
=== League teams ===
- Abercynon RFC
- Bedlinog RFC
- Fleur De Lys RFC
- Heol y Cyw RFC
- Llantrisant RFC
- Llantwit Fardre RFC
- Penallta RFC
- Rhydyfelin RFC
- Rhymney RFC
- Tylorstown RFC
- Ynysybwl RFC
- Ystrad Rhondda

=== 2011/2012 Table ===
2010-2011 WRU Division Two East League Table
	Club	Played	Won	Drawn	Lost	Points for	Points against	Tries for	Tries against	Try bonus	Losing bonus	Points
1	Ystrad Rhondda RFC	22	18	0	4	657	233	92	26	12	3	87
2	Penallta RFC	22	18	0	4	542	295	70	26	8	3	83
3	Rhydyfelin RFC	22	14	0	8	599	322	83	30	9	6	71
4	Ynysybwl RFC	22	14	2	6	553	395	68	39	9	2	71
5	Heol y Cyw RFC	22	15	0	7	442	299	53	35	6	4	70
6	Llantrisant RFC	22	13	1	8	480	453	44	51	5	1	60
7	Llantwit Fardre RFC	22	8	0	14	424	489	51	62	4	4	40
8	Bedlinog RFC	22	8	0	14	406	529	38	58	3	4	39
9	Abercynon RFC	22	7	1	14	383	614	40	83	3	2	35
10	Tylorstown RFC	22	7	0	15	302	559	35	70	3	2	33
11	Fleur De Lys RFC	22	5	0	17	308	627	29	81	2	5	27
12	Rhymney RFC	22	3	0	19	276	557	30	72	1	5	18
Correct as of 26 May 2012												

== 2010/2011 Season ==
=== League teams ===
- Brynmawr RFC
- Caerphilly RFC
- Fleur De Lys RFC
- Llantrisant RFC
- Llantwit Fardre RFC
- Mountain Ash RFC
- Penallta RFC
- Penarth RFC
- Rhydyfelin RFC
- Tredegar RFC
- Tylorstown RFC
- Ynysybwl RFC

=== 2010/2011 Table ===
2010-2011 WRU Division Two East League Table
	Club	Played	Won	Drawn	Lost	Points for	Points against	Tries for	Tries against	Try bonus	Losing bonus	Points
1	Mountain Ash RFC	22	22	0	0	791	280	103	32	15	0	103
2	Tredegar RFC	22	19	0	3	786	361	107	39	17	2	95
3	Llantrisant RFC	22	13	0	9	617	520	79	71	11	2	65
4	Rhydyfelin RFC	22	13	1	8	593	489	87	61	8	2	64
5	Penallta RFC	22	11	0	11	433	407	56	49	7	4	55
6	Tylorstown RFC	22	10	1	11	501	517	66	63	7	5	54
7	Fleur De Lys RFC	22	9	1	12	535	575	65	70	10	5	53
8	Llantwit Fardre RFC	22	10	1	11	464	504	60	64	3	2	47
9	Ynysybwl RFC	22	9	1	12	470	564	56	70	4	4	46
10	Brynmawr RFC	22	8	1	13	474	560	61	71	7	5	46
11	Penarth RFC	22	5	0	17	335	556	37	74	2	4	26
12	Caerphilly RFC	22	0	0	22	295	961	32	145	2	2	4
Correct as of 26 May 2012												

== 2009/2010 Season ==
=== League teams ===
- Abercynon RFC
- Brynmawr RFC
- Gilfach Goch RFC
- Garndiffaith RFC
- Llantrisant RFC
- Llantwit Fardre RFC
- Mountain Ash RFC
- Newport Saracens RFC
- Penallta RFC
- Rhydyfelin RFC
- Treorchy RFC
- Ynysybwl RFC

=== 2009/2010 Table ===
2009-2010 WRU Division Two East League Table
Club	Played	Won	Drawn	Lost	Points for	Points against	Tries for	Tries against	Try bonus	Losing bonus	Points
Gilfach Goch RFC	22	16	1	5	560	343	65	37	7	3	76
Treorchy RFC	22	15	0	7	636	382	79	44	10	2	72
Rhydyfelin RFC	22	13	2	7	525	431	73	51	11	4	71
Mountain Ash RFC	22	13	3	6	404	292	50	33	6	3	67
Brynmawr RFC	22	11	0	11	508	406	65	47	9	7	60
Ynysybwl RFC	22	10	0	12	416	453	55	54	7	5	52
Llantrisant RFC	22	10	1	11	438	532	54	69	5	5	52
Penallta RFC	22	11	0	11	416	488	50	63	2	2	48
Llantwit Fardre RFC	22	10	1	11	392	470	50	60	2	1	45
Abercynon RFC	22	8	0	14	418	546	41	73	5	3	40
Newport Saracens RFC	22	6	1	15	365	453	49	56	3	6	35
Garndiffaith RFC	22	4	1	17	393	675	45	89	5	4	27
Correct as of 3 August 2010											

== 2008/2009 Season ==
=== League teams ===
- Abercynon RFC
- Abergavenny RFC
- Bedlinog RFC
- Brynmawr RFC
- Fleur De Lys RFC
- Gilfach Goch RFC
- Llantrisant RFC
- Mountain Ash RFC
- Rhydyfelin RFC
- Tredegar RFC
- Treherbert RFC
- Ynysybwl RFC

=== 2008/2009 Table ===
2008-2009 WRU Division Two East League Table
Club	Played	Won	Drawn	Lost	Points for	Points against	Tries for	Tries against	Try bonus	Losing bonus	Points
Tredegar RFC	22	19	0	3	634	333	87	37	10	1	87
Bedlinog RFC	22	17	0	5	570	252	71	25	8	1	77
Mountain Ash RFC	22	15	0	7	474	313	63	31	4	4	68
Gilfach Goch RFC	22	14	1	7	415	277	54	33	5	4	67
Brynmawr RFC	22	11	3	8	446	348	58	45	6	5	61
Abercynon RFC	22	11	0	11	472	407	55	53	5	5	54
Llantrisant RFC	22	10	0	12	412	426	49	54	4	6	50
Ynysybwl RFC	22	9	1	12	376	416	43	53	2	5	45
Rhydyfelin RFC	22	9	0	13	323	404	42	48	5	4	45
Abergavenny RFC	22	8	0	14	379	422	49	54	5	8	45
Fleur De Lys RFC	22	6	1	15	346	769	46	102	3	2	31
Treherbert RFC	22	0	0	22	282	762	30	112	0	2	2
Correct as of 00:00 16 May 2009											

== 2007/2008 Season ==
At the end of the season Ystrad Rhondda were crowned champions and gained promotion to the Division One East league, along with second placed Penallta. Newport High School Old Boys and Pill Harriers were relegated to Division Three East, while Llanishen were relegated to Division Three South East.

=== League teams ===
- Abercynon RFC
- Builth Wells RFC
- Llanishen RFC
- Mountain Ash RFC
- Newport High School Old Boys RFC
- Pill Harriers RFC
- Penallta RFC
- Rhydyfelin RFC
- Tredegar RFC
- Treherbert RFC
- Ynysybwl RFC
- Ystrad Rhondda RFC

=== 2007/2008 Table ===
2007-2008 WRU Division Two East League Table
Club	Played	Won	Drawn	Lost	Points for	Points against	Tries for	Tries against	Try bonus	Losing bonus	Points
Ystrad Rhondda RFC	22	19	0	3	672	280	81	34	9	2	87
Penallta RFC	22	17	0	5	499	312	73	40	10	2	80
Mountain Ash RFC	22	16	0	6	486	270	60	29	8	4	76
Tredegar RFC	22	13	0	9	521	327	69	41	10	4	66
Builth Wells RFC	22	13	0	9	517	297	66	37	10	3	65
Treherbert RFC	22	14	0	8	445	406	57	45	5	2	63
Abercynon RFC	22	12	0	10	535	476	71	64	9	2	59
Ynysybwl RFC	22	10	0	12	476	389	67	47	6	4	50
Rhydyfelin RFC	22	9	0	13	385	426	51	53	5	6	47
Newport HSOB RFC	22	5	0	17	380	710	53	99	5	5	30
Llanishen RFC	22	4	0	18	300	632	35	92	3	3	22
Pill Harriers RFC	22	0	0	22	208	899	33	135	1	3	5
Correct as of 00:00 11 May 2008											

== 2006/2007 Season ==
See 2006–07 in Welsh rugby union

== Winners ==
Season	Winners	Name of league
2006-07	Llantrisant RFC	WRU Division Two East
2007-08	Ystrad Rhondda RFC	WRU Division Two East
2008-09	Tredegar RFC	WRU League 2 East
2009-10	Gilfach Goch RFC	WRU League 2 East
2010-11	Mountain Ash RFC	WRU League 2 East
2011-12	Ystrad Rhondda RFC	WRU League 2 East
2012-13	Bedlinog RFC	WRU League 2 East
2013-14	Rhiwbina RFC	WRU League 2 East
2014-15		WRU League 2 East
2015-16		
2016-17	Dinas Powys RFC	
2017-18	Gilfach Goch RFC	
2018-19	St.Peters RFC	
