= Glamorgan County Silver Ball Trophy =

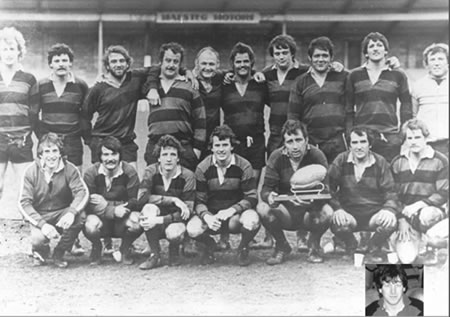
- Aberavon Harlequins, winners in 1982, with the trophy
- Founded: 1956
- Region: Glamorgan, Wales
- Current champions: Bonymaen RFC
- Most championships: Glynneath RFC

The Glamorgan County Silver Ball Trophy (also known as the Glamorgan County Silver Ball Trophy) is a Welsh rugby union competition open to all non-premier Welsh Rugby Union (WRU) clubs playing in the Glamorgan area.

== History ==
The Silver Ball competition was suggested by Glamorgan County president Glan Williams in 1955. The first tournament took place in 1956 when J. Norman Hunt volunteered to meet the costs. It was open to all 64 WRU clubs in the Glamorgan region. The Silver Ball Trophy was made by Birmingham-based trophy maker Thomas Fattorini Ltd and cost £100 to produce. The idea was to match eight junior teams against the county's eight first class sides, but a poor response from the senior teams resulted in the Welsh Academicals being drafted in to make a realistic quarter finals.

The tournament also produces the SA Brains trophy which is awarded to the team to have scored the most tries during the buildup to the final. This team is then invited to play the Silver Ball winners in a pre-season friendly for the President's Cup.

The trophy is sponsored by Chemical Corporation since season 2019/20.

== Silver Ball Trophy finals ==
| Season | Winners | Losing Finalists | Score | Venue |
|---|---|---|---|---|
| 1956–57 | Taibach RFC | Skewen RFC | 9–3 | The Gnoll, Neath |
| 1957–58 | Welsh Academicals RFC | Seven Sisters RFC | 8–6 | Talbot Athletic Ground Aberavon |
| 1958–59 | Maesteg Celtic RFC | Bargoed RFC | 6–3 | The Gnoll, Neath |
| 1959–60 | Seven Sisters RFC | Maesteg Celtic RFC | 6–5 | The Gnoll, Neath |
| 1960–61 | Glynneath RFC | Bargoed RFC | 12–0 | Brewery Field, Bridgend |
| 1961–62 | Glynneath RFC | Resolven RFC | 11–0 | The Gnoll, Neath |
| 1962–63 | Glynneath RFC | Cwmgwrach RFC | 6–5 | The Gnoll, Neath |
| 1963–64 | Llantwit Major RFC | Taibach RFC | 3–0 | Brewery Field, Bridgend |
| 1964–65 | Llantwit Major RFC | Kenfig Hill RFC | 3–0 | Brewery Field, Bridgend |
| 1965–66 | Cwmgwrach RFC | Senghenydd RFC | 6–3 | The Gnoll, Neath |
| 1966–67 | Cardiff Athletic RFC | Aberavon Quins RFC | 27–0 | Brewery Field, Bridgend |
| 1967–68 | Cardiff Athletic RFC | Taibach RFC | 27–3 | Brewery Field, Bridgend |
| 1968–69 | UWIC RFC | Penygraig RFC | 9–0 | Brewery Field, Bridgend |
| 1969–70 | UWIC RFC | Bridgend Sports RFC | 19–8 | Brewery Field, Bridgend |
| 1970–71 | Senghenydd RFC | Nantyffyllon RFC | 11–5 | Penygraig RFC |
| 1971–72 | Senghenydd RFC | Beddau RFC | 13–12 | Penygraig RFC |
| 1972–73 | Abercynon RFC | Penygraig RFC | 10–6 | Senghenydd RFC |
| 1973–74 | Kenfig Hill RFC | Mumbles RFC | 3–0 | Brewery Field, Bridgend |
| 1974–75 | Taffs Well RFC | Pyle RFC | 9–6 | Brewery Field, Bridgend |
| 1975–76 | Pyle RFC | Abercynon RFC | 22–11 | Old Parish Maesteg |
| 1976–77 | Abercynon RFC | Llanharan RFC | 30–12 | Sardis Road, Pontypridd |
| 1977–78 | Pyle RFC | British Steel RFC | 18–3 | Talbot Athletic Ground Aberavon |
| 1978–79 | Bridgend Sports RFC | Llanharan RFC | 16–7 | Old Parish Maesteg |
| 1979–80 | Bridgend Sports RFC | Pyle RFC | 9–3 | Brewery Field, Bridgend |
| 1980–81 | Bridgend Sports RFC | Cilfynydd RFC | 20–9 | Brewery Field, Bridgend |
| 1981–82 | Aberavon Quins RFC | Neath Athletic RFC | 22–14 | Old Parish Maesteg |
| 1982–83 | Swansea Athletic RFC | Old Illitydians RFC | 17–3 | Brewery Field, Bridgend |
| 1983–84 | Cilfynydd RFC | Seven Sisters RFC | 12–0 | Brewery Field, Bridgend |
| 1984–85 | Cilfynydd RFC | Nantyffyllon RFC | 14–7 | Brewery Field, Bridgend |
| 1985–86 | St. Peters RFC | Rumney RFC | 10–9 | Cardiff Arms Park Cardiff |
| 1986–87 | Tondu RFC | Vardre RFC | 16–4 | Brewery Field, Bridgend |
| 1987–88 | Neath Athletic RFC | Glamorgan Wanderers A RFC | 13-12 | Brewery Field, Bridgend |
| 1988–89 | Llantrisant RFC | Bridgend Athletic RFC | 35–12 | Brewery Field, Bridgend |
| 1989–90 | Beddau RFC | Maesteg Celtic RFC | 31–0 | Brewery Field, Bridgend |
| 1990–91 | Tondu RFC | Abercynon RFC | 16-4 | Brewery Field, Bridgend |
| 1991–92 | Tondu RFC | Cardiff Quins RFC | 18–7 | Brewery Field, Bridgend |
| 1992–93 | Tondu RFC | Tonmawr RFC | 22–14 | Brewery Field, Bridgend |
| 1993–94 | Llantrisant RFC | Glynneath RFC | 20–16 | Brewery Field, Bridgend |
| 1994–95 | Tonyrefail RFC | Gilfach Goch RFC | 12–10 | Brewery Field, Bridgend |
| 1995–96 | Resolven RFC | Penygraig RFC | 12–10 | Brewery Field, Bridgend |
| 1996–97 | Gilfach Goch RFC | Treherbert RFC | 31–13 | Brewery Field, Bridgend |
| 1997–98 | Gilfach Goch RFC | British Steel RFC | 34–22 | Sardis Road, Pontypridd |
| 1998–99 | Ynysybwl RFC | Nantymoel RFC | 22–13 | Sardis Road, Pontypridd |
| 1999–00 | Glamorgan Wanderers RFC | Beddau RFC | 28–21 | Brewery Field, Bridgend |
| 2000–01 | Maesteg Harlequins RFC | Vardre RFC | 20–17 | Brewery Field, Bridgend |
| 2001–02 | British Steel RFC | Bridgend Athletic RFC | 26–22 | Brewery Field, Bridgend |
| 2002–03 | Penygraig RFC | Pontypridd RFC | 30–25 | The Dairy Field Llanharan |
| 2003–04 | Banwen RFC | Maesteg RFC | 36–27 | Virginia Park, Caerphilly |
| 2004–05 | Penallta RFC | Rhydyfelin RFC | 43–30 | Sardis Road, Pontypridd |
| 2005–06 | Ynysybwl RFC | Tonna RFC | 21–14 | Sardis Road, Pontypridd |
| 2006–07 | Tonmawr RFC | Penallta RFC | 26–24 | Sardis Road, Pontypridd |
| 2007–08 | Tonmawr RFC | Aberavon Green Stars RFC | 50–12 | The Dairy Field Llanharan |
| 2008–09 | Aberavon Quins RFC | Llantwit Fardre RFC | 17–3 | The Dairy Field Llanharan |
| 2009–10 | Tonmawr RFC | Tondu RFC | 26–15 | Brewery Field, Bridgend |
| 2010–11 | Maesteg Harlequins RFC | Mountain Ash RFC | 19–16 | Brewery Field, Bridgend |
| 2011–12 | Glynneath RFC | Maesteg Harlequins RFC | 13–10 | The Dairy Field Llanharan |
| 2012–13 | Bedlinog RFC | Tondu RFC | 29–10 | Brewery Field Bridgend |
| 2013–14 | Glynneath RFC | Rhiwbina RFC | 34–15 | Brewery Field Bridgend |
| 2014–15 | Penallta RFC | Ystrad Rhondda RFC | 22–17 | Talbot Athletic Ground Aberavon |
| 2015–16 | Bedlinog RFC | Porth Harlequins RFC | 32–15 | Talbot Athletic Ground Aberavon |
| 2016–17 | Rhydyfelin RFC | TonduRFC | 17–10 | Brewery Field Bridgend |
| 2017–18 | Glamorgan Wanderers RFC | Maesteg Harlequins RFC | 37–32 | Brewery Field Bridgend |
| 2018–19 | Nantyffyllon RFC | Ystalyfera RFC | 18–12 | Brewery Field Bridgend |
| 2019–20 | COVID-19 | | | |
| 2020–21 | COVID-19 | | | |
| 2021–22 | COVID-19 | | | |
| 2022–23 | Morriston RFC | Pontarddulais RFC | 16–15 | Tata RFC Port Talbot |
| 2023–24 | Llanharan RFC | Abercrave RFC | 54–3 | Brewery Field Bridgend |
| 2024–25 | Beddau RFC | Penarth RFC | 50–14 | Brewery Field Bridgend |
| 2025-26 | Bonymaen RFC | Tondu RFC | 18-16 | Brewery Field Bridgend |
| 2026-27 | RFC | RFC | 0-0 | Brewery Field Bridgend |

== Competition multiple winners ==
- Five Wins

Glynneath RFC

- Four wins

Tondu RFC

- Three wins

Bridgend Sports RFC
Tonmawr RFC

- Two wins

Aberavon Quins RFC
Abercynon RFC
Beddau RFC
Cardiff Athletic
Cilfynydd RFC
Gilfach Goch RFC
Glamorgan Wanderers RFC
Llantrisant RFC
Llantwit Major RFC
Maesteg Harlequins RFC
Penallta RFC
Pyle RFC
Senghenydd RFC
UWIC RFC
Ynysybwl RFC

== Bibliography ==
- Davies, D.E. (1975). Cardiff Rugby Club, History and Statistics 1876–1975. Risca: The Starling Press. ISBN 0-9504421-0-0.
