= 2006–07 WRU Division Two East =

The 2006–07 WRU Division Two East or 2006–07 Asda Division Two East for sponsorship reasons was the twelfth season of the WRU Division Two and the first season of the WRU Division Two East. The season began on Saturday 2 September 2006 and ended on Saturday 5 May 2007. Twelve teams played each other on a home and away basis. This was also the last season where teams earned three points for a win and one point for a draw.

== Table ==
Pos	Team	Pld	W	D	L	PF	PA	PD	TF	TA	Pts
1	Llantrisant	22	22	0	0	642	309	+333	83	41	66
2	Rumney	22	17	0	5	680	403	+277	94	51	51
3	Treherbert	22	15	0	7	517	448	+69	61	58	45
4	Tredegar	22	14	0	8	595	397	+198	81	51	42
5	Ynysybwl	22	11	0	11	497	484	+13	62	59	33
6	Rhydyfelin	22	10	0	12	461	475	−14	62	59	30
7	Nantymoel	22	8	1	13	432	505	−73	55	67	25
8	Mountain Ash	22	8	1	13	360	430	−70	46	53	25
9	Pill Harriers	22	8	0	14	396	484	−88	50	71	24
10	Llantwit Fardre	22	7	0	15	384	472	−88	49	55	21
11	Croesyceiliog	22	6	2	14	435	729	−294	56	103	20
12	Abergavenny	22	4	0	18	376	639	−263	54	85	12

== Results ==
=== Matchday 1 ===
Saturday 2 September, 2:30pm
Abergavenny RFC	15 - 35	Rhydyfelin RFC
Croesyceiliog RFC	7 - 52	Rumney RFC
Llantrisant RFC	32 - 10	Nantymoel RFC
Llantwit Fardre RFC	26 - 0	Tredegar RFC
Mountain Ash RFC	8 - 12	Ynysybwl RFC
Treherbert RFC	12 - 6	Pill Harriers RFC

=== Matchday 2 ===
Saturday 16 September, 2:30pm
Nantymoel RFC	48 - 8	Croesyceiliog RFC
Pill Harriers RFC	20 - 29	Llantwit Fardre RFC
Rhydyfelin RFC	43 - 19	Treherbert RFC
Rumney RFC	20 - 8	Abergavenny RFC
Tredegar RFC	36 - 0	Mountain Ash RFC
Ynysybwl RFC	13 - 47	Llantrisant RFC

=== Matchday 3 ===
Saturday 23 September, 2:30pm
Abergavenny RFC	17 - 7	Nantymoel RFC
Croesyceiliog RFC	25 - 54	Ynysybwl RFC
Llantrisant RFC	35 - 24	Tredegar RFC
Mountain Ash RFC	8 - 30	Llantwit Fardre RFC
Pill Harriers RFC	17 - 36	Rhydyfelin RFC
Treherbert RFC	10 - 48	Rumney RFC

=== Matchday 4 ===
Saturday 7 October, 2:30pm
Llantwit Fardre RFC	8 - 15	Rhydyfelin RFC
Mountain Ash RFC	14 - 46	Llantrisant RFC
Nantymoel RFC	25 - 27	Treherbert RFC
Rumney RFC	27 - 16	Pill Harriers RFC
Tredegar RFC	83 - 14	Croesyceiliog RFC
Ynysybwl RFC	32 - 20	Abergavenny RFC

=== Matchday 5 ===
Saturday 14 October, 2:30pm
Abergavenny RFC	17 - 43	Tredegar RFC
Croesyceiliog RFC	13 - 13	Mountain Ash RFC
Llantrisant RFC	29 - 0	Llantwit Fardre RFC
Pill Harriers RFC	20 - 10	Nantymoel RFC
Rhydyfelin RFC	22 - 30	Rumney RFC
Treherbert RFC	41 - 24	Ynysybwl RFC

=== Matchday 6 ===
Saturday 28 October, 2:30pm
Llantrisant RFC	30 - 23	Croesyceiliog RFC
Llantwit Fardre RFC	36 - 30	Rumney RFC
Mountain Ash RFC	19 - 18	Abergavenny RFC
Nantymoel RFC	11 - 16	Rhydyfelin RFC
Tredegar RFC	38 - 3	Treherbert RFC
Ynysybwl RFC	26 - 10	Pill Harriers RFC

=== Matchday 7 (5/6) ===
Saturday 18 November, 2:30pm
Abergavenny RFC	22 - 23	Llantrisant RFC
Pill Harriers RFC	7 - 41	Tredegar RFC
Rhydyfelin RFC	15 - 10	Ynysybwl RFC
Rumney RFC	33 - 0	Nantymoel RFC
Treherbert RFC	26 - 13	Mountain Ash RFC

=== Matchday 8 ===
Saturday 2 December, 2:30pm
Croesyceiliog RFC	29 - 19	Abergavenny RFC
Llantrisant RFC	36 - 10	Treherbert RFC
Llantwit Fardre RFC	27 - 31	Nantymoel RFC
Mountain Ash RFC	22 - 7	Pill Harriers RFC
Tredegar RFC	13 - 18	Rhydyfelin RFC
Ynysybwl RFC	28 - 41	Rumney RFC

=== Matchday 9 (4/6) ===
Saturday 9 December, 2:30pm
Abergavenny RFC	28 - 22	Llantwit Fardre RFC
Pill Harriers RFC	12 - 38	Llantrisant RFC
Rhydyfelin RFC	23 - 12	Mountain Ash RFC
Treherbert RFC	47 - 6	Croesyceiliog RFC

=== Matchday 10 (3/6) ===
Saturday 16 December, 2:30pm
Abergavenny RFC	12 - 31	Treherbert RFC
Croesyceiliog RFC	14 - 18	Pill Harriers RFC
Mountain Ash RFC	20 - 32	Rumney RFC

=== Matchday 11 (2/6) ===
Saturday 6 January, 2:30pm
Pill Harriers RFC	7 - 8	Treherbert RFC
Ynysybwl RFC	6 - 23	Mountain Ash RFC

=== Matchday 12 (5/6) ===
Saturday 13 January, 2:30pm
Abergavenny RFC	22 - 24	Rumney RFC
Croesyceiliog RFC	12 - 12	Nantymoel RFC
Llantrisant RFC	8 - 6	Ynysybwl RFC
Mountain Ash RFC	13 - 15	Tredegar RFC
Treherbert RFC	15 - 0	Rhydyfelin RFC

=== Matchday 13 (3/6) ===
Saturday 20 January, 2:30pm
Nantymoel RFC	29 - 8	Abergavenny RFC
Tredegar RFC	6 - 16	Llantrisant RFC
Ynysybwl RFC	32 - 13	Croesyceiliog RFC

=== Matchday 14 ===
Saturday 27 January, 2:30pm
Abergavenny RFC	22 - 10	Ynysybwl RFC
Croesyceiliog RFC	24 - 33	Tredegar RFC
Llantrisant RFC	24 - 16	Mountain Ash RFC
Pill Harriers RFC	15 - 35	Rumney RFC
Rhydyfelin RFC	21 - 10	Llantwit Fardre RFC
Treherbert RFC	25 - 0	Nantymoel RFC

=== Matchday 15 ===
Saturday 3 February, 2:30pm
Llantwit Fardre RFC	12 - 21	Llantrisant RFC
Mountain Ash RFC	26 - 7	Croesyceiliog RFC
Nantymoel RFC	19 - 44	Pill Harriers RFC
Rumney RFC	33 - 21	Rhydyfelin RFC
Tredegar RFC	37 - 12	Abergavenny RFC
Ynysybwl RFC	18 - 17	Treherbert RFC

=== Matchday 16 ===
Saturday 17 February, 2:30pm
Abergavenny RFC	17 - 18	Mountain Ash RFC
Croesyceiliog RFC	22 - 41	Llantrisant RFC
Pill Harriers RFC	3 - 15	Ynysybwl RFC
Rhydyfelin RFC	15 - 32	Nantymoel RFC
Rumney RFC	31 - 14	Llantwit Fardre RFC
Treherbert RFC	15 - 9	Tredegar RFC

=== Mixed matchdays ===
Saturday 24 February, 2:30pm
Llantrisant RFC	11 - 0	Rhydyfelin RFC (M 10 - 4/6)
Llantwit Fardre RFC	5 - 10	Pill Harriers RFC (M 12 - 6/6)
Nantymoel RFC	27 - 22	Mountain Ash RFC (M 17 - 1/6)

=== Matchday 18 (5/6) ===
Saturday 3 March, 2:30pm
Llantrisant RFC	41 - 12	Abergavenny RFC
Llantwit Fardre RFC	11 - 10	Croesyceiliog RFC
Mountain Ash RFC	14 - 25	Treherbert RFC
Tredegar RFC	47 - 0	Pill Harriers RFC
Ynysybwl RFC	25 - 18	Rhydyfelin RFC

=== Matchday 17 (4/6) ===
Friday 9 March, 7:15pm
Rumney RFC	17 - 20	Llantrisant RFC
Wednesday 14 March, 7:15pm
Croesyceiliog RFC	28 - 22	Rhydyfelin RFC
Friday 16 March, 7:15pm
Ynysybwl RFC	13 - 17	Tredegar RFC

=== Matchday 11 (3/6) ===
Wednesday 21 March, 2:30pm
Rumney RFC	33 - 24	Croesyceiliog RFC

=== Matchday 19 ===
Saturday 24 March, 2:30pm
Abergavenny RFC	17 - 34	Croesyceiliog RFC
Nantymoel RFC	15 - 22	Llantwit Fardre RFC
Pill Harriers RFC	17 - 22	Mountain Ash RFC
Rhydyfelin RFC	12 - 39	Tredegar RFC
Rumney RFC	41 - 25	Ynysybwl RFC
Treherbert RFC	22 - 27	Llantrisant RFC

=== Matchday 20 ===
Saturday 31 March, 2:30pm
Croesyceiliog RFC	41 - 32	Treherbert RFC
Llantrisant RFC	42 - 5	Pill Harriers RFC
Llantwit Fardre RFC	20 - 26	Abergavenny RFC
Mountain Ash RFC	35 - 15	Rhydyfelin RFC
Tredegar RFC	10 - 24	Rumney RFC
Ynysybwl RFC	65 - 24	Nantymoel RFC

=== Matchday 21 ===
Saturday 7 April, 2:30pm
Nantymoel RFC	44 - 7	Tredegar RFC
Pill Harriers RFC	55 - 17	Croesyceiliog RFC
Rhydyfelin RFC	22 - 28	Llantrisant RFC
Rumney RFC	12 - 10	Mountain Ash RFC
Treherbert RFC	31 - 28	Abergavenny RFC
Ynysybwl RFC	21 - 9	Llantwit Fardre RFC

=== Matchday 7 (6/6) ===
Wednesday 11 April, 2:30pm
Croesyceiliog RFC	29 - 18	Llantwit Fardre RFC

=== Matchday 22 ===
Saturday 14 April, 2:30pm
Abergavenny RFC	12 - 20	Pill Harriers RFC
Llantrisant RFC	20 - 18	Rumney RFC
Llantwit Fardre RFC	18 - 29	Treherbert RFC
Mountain Ash RFC	20 - 0	Nantymoel RFC
Rhydyfelin RFC	33 - 35	Croesyceiliog RFC
Tredegar RFC	43 - 17	Ynysybwl RFC

=== Mixed matchdays ===
Wednesday 18 April
6:45pm
Rhydyfelin RFC	7 - 25	Pill Harriers RFC (M 13 - 4/6)
7:00pm
Tredegar RFC	18 - 12	Nantymoel RFC (M 10 - 5/6)

=== Mixed matchdays ===
Saturday 21 April, 2:30pm
Llantwit Fardre RFC	15 - 24	Ynysybwl RFC (M 10 - 6/6)
Rhydyfelin RFC	52 - 24	Abergavenny RFC (M 11 - 4/6)
Rumney RFC	20 - 41	Treherbert RFC (M 13 - 5/6)

=== Matchday 11 (6/6) ===
Wednesday 25 April
6:30pm
Nantymoel RFC	23 - 27	Llantrisant RFC
7:00pm
Tredegar RFC	31 - 15	Llantwit Fardre RFC

=== Mixed matchdays ===
Saturday 28 April, 2:30pm
Nantymoel RFC	24 - 21	Ynysybwl RFC (M 9 - 5/6)
Pill Harriers RFC	62 - 0	Abergavenny RFC (M 17 - 5/6)
Rumney RFC	60 - 5	Tredegar RFC (M 9 - 6/6)
Treherbert RFC	31 - 15	Llantwit Fardre RFC (M 17 - 6/6)

=== Matchday 18 (6/6) ===
Thursday 3 May, 6:30pm
Nantymoel RFC	29 - 19	Rumney RFC

=== Matchday 13 (6/6) ===
Saturday 5 May, 2:30pm
Llantwit Fardre RFC	22 - 12	Mountain Ash RFC
