= 2006–07 WRU Division One East =

The 2006–07 WRU Division One East or 2006–07 Asda Division One East for sponsorship reasons was the twelfth season of the WRU Division One and the first season of the WRU Division One East. The season began on Saturday 2 September 2006 and ended on Saturday 5 April 2007. Twelve teams played each other on a home and away basis. This was also the last season where teams earned three points for a win and one point for a draw.

== Table ==
POS	TEAM	PL	W	D	L	PF	PA	DIFF	TF	TA	PTS
1	Beddau	22	19	0	3	654	321	333	85	29	57
2	Bargoed	22	17	0	5	665	436	229	89	48	51
3	Newbridge	22	17	0	5	516	281	235	63	32	51
4	Pontypool	22	15	0	7	515	370	145	59	44	45
5	Fleur de Lys	22	10	0	12	422	523	-101	49	61	30
6	UWIC	22	9	1	12	625	604	21	74	72	28
7	Newport Saracens	22	9	1	12	368	457	-89	46	52	28
8	Llanharan	22	9	0	13	546	565	-19	66	75	27
9	Caerphilly	22	8	0	14	402	572	-170	47	75	24
10	Blackwood	22	6	1	15	433	511	-78	51	59	19
11	Abercynon	22	5	2	15	365	718	-353	45	105	17
12	Ystrad Rhondda	22	5	1	16	417	570	-153	47	69	16

== Results ==
=== Matchday 1 ===
Saturday 2 September 2006, 2:30pm
Beddau	14 - 0	Abercynon
Blackwood	13 - 24	Bargoed
Caerphilly	9 - 12	Newport Saracens
Newbridge	25 - 3	Fleur de Lys
UWIC	27 - 17	Llanharan
Ystrad Rhondda	9 - 11	Pontypool

=== Matchday 2 ===
Saturday 9 September 2006, 2:30pm
Abercynon	15 - 52	UWIC
Bargoed	43 - 27	Newport Saracens
Blackwood	6 - 10	Newbridge
Fleur de Lys	23 - 17	Ystrad Rhondda
Llanharan	26 - 27	Caerphilly
Pontypool	16 - 10	Beddau

=== Matchday 3 ===
Saturday 16 September 2006, 2:30pm
Beddau	33 - 29	Fleur de Lys
Caerphilly	27 - 18	Abercynon
Newbridge	16 - 5	Bargoed
Newport Saracens	26 - 22	Llanharan
UWIC	27 - 20	Pontypool
Ystrad Rhondda	18 - 30	Blackwood

=== Matchday 4 ===
Saturday 23 September 2006, 2:30pm
Abercynon	27 - 17	Newport Saracens
Bargoed	42 - 29	Llanharan
Blackwood	30 - 33	Beddau
Fleur de Lys	20 - 51	UWIC
Newbridge	29 - 17	Ystrad Rhondda
Pontypool	39 - 8	Caerphilly

=== Matchday 5 ===
Saturday 30 September 2006, 2:30pm
Beddau	14 - 10	Newbridge
Caerphilly	10 - 21	Fleur de Lys
Llanharan	81 - 8	Abercynon
Newport Saracens	11 - 9	Pontypool
UWIC	12 - 6	Blackwood
Ystrad Rhondda	24 - 21	Bargoed

=== Matchday 6 ===
Saturday 7 October 2006, 2:30pm
Bargoed	71 - 20	Abercynon
Blackwood	48 - 13	Caerphilly
Fleur de Lys	25 - 22	Newport Saracens
Newbridge	34 - 11	UWIC
Pontypool	45 - 34	Llanharan
Ystrad Rhondda	6 - 38	Beddau

=== Matchday 7 ===
Saturday 14 October 2006, 2:30pm
Abercynon	10 - 43	Pontypool
Bargoed	23 - 16	Beddau
Caerphilly	26 - 40	Newbridge
Llanharan	33 - 40	Fleur de Lys
Newport Saracens	22 - 13	Blackwood
UWIC	62 - 19	Ystrad Rhondda

=== Matchday 8 (5/6) ===
Saturday 28 October 2006, 2:30pm
Beddau	27 - 26	UWIC
Blackwood	15 - 33	Llanharan
Fleur de Lys	26 - 15	Abercynon
Newbridge	37 - 17	Newport Saracens
Pontypool	26 - 32	Bargoed

=== Matchday 9 (4/6) ===
Saturday 18 November 2006, 2:30pm
Bargoed	50 - 19	UWIC
Caerphilly	10 - 22	Beddau
Llanharan	8 - 23	Newbridge
Pontypool	17 - 15	Fleur de Lys

=== Matchday 10 ===
Saturday 2 December 2006, 2:30pm
Abercynon	5 - 27	Newbridge
Beddau	23 - 5	Newport Saracens
Blackwood	3 - 22	Pontypool
Fleur de Lys	10 - 45	Bargoed
Llanharan	21 - 16	Ystrad Rhondda
UWIC	20 - 37	Caerphilly

=== Matchday 11 ===
Saturday 9 December 2006, 2:30pm
Beddau	37 - 3	Pontypool
Caerphilly	7 - 24	Llanharan
Newbridge	28 - 9	Blackwood
Newport Saracens	10 - 34	Bargoed
UWIC	25 - 3	Abercynon
Ystrad Rhondda	15 - 19	Fleur de Lys

=== Matchday 12 (3/6) ===
Saturday 23 December 2006, 2:30pm
Llanharan	31 - 22	UWIC
Newport Saracens	14 - 15	Caerphilly
Pontypool	21 - 5	Ystrad Rhondda

=== Matchday 13 (3/6) ===
Saturday 30 December 2006, 2:30pm
Newbridge	6 - 15	Pontypool
UWIC	3 - 13	Newport Saracens
Saturday 7 April 2007, 2:30pm
Llanharan	12 - 50	Beddau

=== Matchday 14 (4/6) ===
Saturday 6 January 2007, 2:30pm
Abercynon	31 - 27	Caerphilly
Bargoed	19 - 20	Newbridge
Fleur de Lys	3 - 27	Beddau
Pontypool	52 - 18	UWIC

=== Matchday 15 (4/6) ===
Saturday 13 January 2007, 2:30pm
Beddau	41 - 14	Blackwood
Caerphilly	20 - 12	Pontypool
Llanharan	16 - 22	Bargoed
Ystrad Rhondda	11 - 21	Newbridge

=== Matchday 16 (4/6) ===
Saturday 20 January 2007, 2:30pm
Abercynon	31 - 14	Llanharan
Bargoed	27 - 17	Ystrad Rhondda
Fleur de Lys	20 - 32	Caerphilly
Pontypool	16 - 5	Newport Saracens

=== Matchday 17 (1/6) ===
Saturday 27 January 2007, 2:30pm
Llanharan	23 - 19	Blackwood

=== Matchday 18 ===
Saturday 3 February 2007, 2:30pm
Abercynon	13 - 30	Bargoed
Beddau	56 - 22	Ystrad Rhondda
Caerphilly	21 - 18	Blackwood
Llanharan	29 - 22	Pontypool
Newport Saracens	18 - 8	Fleur de Lys
UWIC	27 - 45	Newbridge

=== Matchday 19 (5/6) ===
Saturday 17 February 2007, 2:30pm
Beddau	29 - 3	Bargoed
Blackwood	15 - 20	Newport Saracens
Fleur de Lys	28 - 11	Llanharan
Pontypool	26 - 16	Abercynon
Ystrad Rhondda	21 - 36	UWIC

=== Matchday 13 (5/6) ===
Saturday 24 February 2007, 2:30pm
Blackwood	0 - 23	Fleur de Lys
Caerphilly	9 - 17	Bargoed

=== Matchday 17 (4/6) ===
Saturday 3 March, 2:30pm
Abercynon	39 - 17	Fleur de Lys
Bargoed	17 - 20	Pontypool
Caerphilly	18 - 16	Ystrad Rhondda

=== Matchday 13 (6/6) ===
Friday 16 March, 7:00pm
Beddau	12 - 32	Llanharan

=== Matchday 19 (6/6) ===
Sunday 18 March, 3:00pm
Newbridge	21 - 14	Caerphilly

=== Matchday 20 ===
Saturday 24 March, 2:30pm
Beddau	35 - 17	Caerphilly
Blackwood	15 - 6	Abercynon
Fleur de Lys	30 - 26	Pontypool
Newbridge	53 - 16	Llanharan
UWIC	30 - 37	Bargoed
Ystrad Rhondda	33 - 29	Newport Saracens

=== Matchday 21 ===
Saturday 31 March, 2:30pm
Bargoed	21 - 13	Fleur de Lys
Caerphilly	15 - 51	UWIC
Newbridge	33 - 3	Abercynon
Newport Saracens	9 - 27	Beddau
Pontypool	29 - 20	Blackwood
Ystrad Rhondda	13 - 19	Llanharan

=== Matchday 16 (5/6) ===
Tuesday 3 April, 7:15pm
Newbridge	9 - 13	Beddau

=== Matchday 22 ===
Saturday 7 April, 2:30pm
Abercynon	20 - 20	Ystrad Rhondda
Bargoed	37 - 30	Caerphilly
Fleur de Lys	10 - 30	Blackwood
Llanharan	12 - 50	Beddau
Newport Saracens	27 - 27	UWIC
Pontypool	25 - 8	Newbridge

=== Mixed matchdays ===
Saturday 14 April, 2:30pm
Abercynon	32 - 32	Blackwood (M 9 - 5/6)
Fleur de Lys	0 - 8	Newbridge (M 12 - 4/6)
Llanharan	15 - 17	Newport Saracens (M 14 - 5/6)
UWIC	25 - 39	Beddau (M 17 - 5/6)
Ystrad Rhondda	30 - 10	Caerphilly (M 8 - 6/6)

=== Mixed matchdays ===
Saturday 21 April, 2:30pm
Abercynon	17 - 58	Beddau (M 12 - 5/6)
Bargoed	45 - 29	Blackwood (M 12 - 6/6)
Newport Saracens	13 - 22	Ystrad Rhondda (M 9 - 6/6)
UWIC	28 - 39	Fleur de Lys (M 15 - 5/6)

=== Mixed matchdays ===
Saturday 28 April, 2:30pm
Blackwood	37 - 26	UWIC (M 16 - 6/6)
Newport Saracens	17 - 13	Newbridge (M 17 - 6/6)
Ystrad Rhondda	46 - 15	Abercynon (M 13 - 6/6)

=== Mixed matchdays ===
Saturday 5 April, 2:30pm
Blackwood	31 - 20	Ystrad Rhondda (M 14 - 6/6)
Newport Saracens	17 - 21	Abercynon (M 15 - 6/6)
