= Kristian Dacey =

Wales international rugby union player

- Born: Kristian Dacey; 25 July 1989 (age 37) Merthyr Tydfil, Wales
- Height: 188 cm (6 ft 2 in)
- Weight: 112 kg (247 lb; 17 st 9 lb)
- School: Bishop Hedley High School

Rugby union career
- Position: Hooker
- Current team: Cardiff Rugby
Youth career
- -: Abercynon
- –: Merthyr
Senior career
Years	Team	Apps	(Points)
2008–2011	Pontypridd RFC	39	(0)
2011–2023	Cardiff Rugby	202	(145)
- Correct as of 9 May 2021
International career
Years	Team	Apps	(Points)
2015–2017	Wales	8	(0)
- Correct as of 2 December 2017

Kristian Dacey (born 25 July 1989) is a Welsh rugby union player who plays as a hooker for Cardiff Rugby. Born in Merthyr Tydfil, he began his rugby career with Abercynon and Merthyr, before moving to Pontypridd. He first played for the Cardiff Blues in 2011.

On 20 January 2015, Dacey was named in the 34-man Wales squad for the 2015 Six Nations Championship.

Dacey made his full international debut for Wales versus Ireland on 8 August 2015 as a second-half replacement.

Dacey was called up as cover for the 2017 British & Irish Lions tour to New Zealand.

At the end of the 2022-23 season, Dacey announced plans to retire, but later joined Brecon RFC.
