= Garyn Lucas =

Welsh rugby union player

Garyn Lucas is a Welsh rugby union player born in Rhydyfelin, Pontypridd. Having come up through the ranks at Rhydyfelin Pontypridd and signed a contract for Glamorgan Wanderers RFC in the Welsh Principality Premiership.

After one season with Glamorgan Wanderers, Lucas moved on to play for Cardiff RFC for two seasons before moving back to his roots and signing for Pontypridd RFC for the 2010/2011 season, and returning to Cardiff RFC in 2012.
