= Rhys Morgan (rugby union) =

Welsh rugby union player (1954–2021)

- Born: Gerwyn Rhys Morgan; 9 June 1954 Southerndown, Bridgend, Wales
- Died: August 2021 (aged 67)
- School: Caerleon Comprehensive; Newport College of Education
- Occupation: plumber

Rugby union career
- Position: Prop
Amateur team(s)
Years	Team	Apps	(Points)
- Caerleon R.F.C.
–	Newport RFC		
–	Barbarian F.C.		
International career
Years	Team	Apps	(Points)
1984	Wales	1	(0)

Gerwyn Rhys Morgan (9 June 1954 – August 2021) was a Wales international rugby union player. He played his club rugby for Newport and captained the team during the 1987–88 season.

== Rugby career ==
Morgan was born in Southerndown, Bridgend. He first played rugby as a schoolboy and represented Caerleon Comprehensive. As a youth he played for both Newport College of Education and Caerleon R.F.C. before being selected for first class Welsh team, Newport RFC. A product of the Newport Youth system he captained the Youth XV before moving into the senior team in the 1974/75 season. He made an impressive start, putting over 28 penalties, 17 conversions and two tries, finishing the season as the club's top scorer with 126 points. Over the years Morgan gradually relinquished his kicking role to concentrate on his scrummaging duties.

Morgan was selected for invitational touring side, the Barbarians, and also faced two international sides for Newport, the New Zealand All Blacks in 1980 and Fiji in 1985. In 1984 he was selected for his one and only international cap, when he was chosen as a late replacement for the Wales team, to face Scotland as part of the 1984 Five Nations Championship, played at Cardiff Arms Park. Wales lost 9–15.

Morgan was given the captaincy of the Newport senior team for the 1987–88 season and remained at the club until his retirement in 1990. He appeared in three WRU Challenge Cup finals, in 1977, 1978 and 1986. He played in 520 games for Newport, a club record that stood until beaten by David Waters.
