= 2008–09 Worthington's District Cup =

The 2008–09 Worthington's District Cup is the national Rugby Union district cup competition of Wales. It is the 36th annual Welsh Districts cup. The current champions are Cambrian Welfare RFC (2 times 1996–97, 2007–08). This was the last Welsh District Cup as the WRU instated all remaining WDRU (Welsh Districts Rugby Union) clubs with full WRU membership.

== 2007–08 final ==
The 2007–08 Final took place at the Millennium Stadium, Cardiff on 12 April. The final was competed between Cambrian Welfare RFC and Bryncethin RFC (both teams from WRU Division 6 Central). The final score was 20 – 8 to Cambrian Welfare RFC who won the competition for the second time.

== Calendar ==
Stage	Date
Round 1	27 September 2008
Round 2	25 October 2008
Round 3	15 November 2008
Round 4	20 December 2008
Quarter-finals	24 January 2009
Semi-finals	21 February 2009
Final	18 April 2009

== Matches ==
=== Round 1 ===
Home team	Score	Away team

=== Round 2 ===
Home team	Score	Away team
Aberbargoed	7–23	Abersychan Alexanders
Aberavon Naval Club	10–43	Penlan
Beaufort	Walkover	Magor
Benllech	26–18	Porthmadog
Bro Ffestiniog	Walkover	Tref y Clawdd
Bryncethin	22–15	Glyncoch
Caereinion Old Boys	Walkover	Menai Bridge
Caerleon	Walkover	New Panteg
Cambrian Welfare	Walkover	Aberbeeg
Cathays	0–5	Cefn Fforest
Cimla	12 – 13 (ab 50 mins)	Tregaron
Cwmcarn Utd	9–15	Cwm
Fall Bay	11–10	Llangadog
Forgeside	7–39	Hartridge
Hafodyrynys	12–18	Blackwood Stars
Llandrindod Wells	65–12	Harlech
Llanrumney	Walkover	West Mon
Llansawel	Walkover	South Gower
Machynlleth	32–5	Abergele
Markham	27–7	CIAC S
Newbridge Utd	28–17	St Julians HSOB
Penybanc	Walkover	Mynydd y Garreg
Pontrhydyfen	11–24	Pantyffynnon
Rogerstone	30–6	Abertysswg
Rhayader	8–27	Flint
Rhosllanerchrugog	21–6	Llangollen
Shotton Steel	Walkover	Holyhead
Sully Sports	0–8	Caerau Ely
Trefil	Walkover	Whitehead
Wattstown	19–12	Clwb Rygbi Cymry Caerdydd
Wick	15–41	Nantgaredig
Ynysowen	86–0	Old Tyleryan

=== Round 3 ===
Home team	Score	Away team
Beaufort	31–16	Abersychan
Benllech	5–26	Rhosllanerchrugog
Bro Ffestiniog	26–3	Penybanc
Bryncethin	Walkover	Ynysowen
Caerau Ely	18–15	COBRA
Caerleon	19–12	Hartridge
Cambrian Welfare	29–9	Markham
Cwm	13–37	Llansawel
Fall Bay	22–18	Rogerstone
Flint	15–48	Llanrumney
Machynlleth	20–21	Blackwood Stars
Newbridge Utd	0–20	Llandrindod Wells
Penlan	39–0	Nantgaredig
Trefil	20–3	Cefn Fforest
Tregaron	18–0	Pantyffynnon
Wattstown	Walkover	Shotton Steel

=== Round 4 ===
Home team	Score	Away team
Blackwood Stars	23–12	Bro Ffestiniog
Bryncethin	18–10	Llanrumney
Cambrian Welfare	17–10	Caerau Ely
Fall Bay	0–38	Wattstown
Llansawel	0–22	Penlan
Llandrindod Wells	13–7	Beaufort
Trefil	19–10	Rhosllanerchrugog
Tregaron	15–35	Caerleon

== Finals ==
=== Quarter-finals ===
Home team	Score	Away team
Blackwood Stars	13 – 15	Trefil
Llandrindod Wells	0 – 33	Bryncethin
Penlan	5 – 10	Cambrian Welfare
Wattstown	15 – 3	Caerleon

=== Semi-finals ===
Team 1	Score	Team 2	Venue
Cambrian Welfare	19 – 18	Bryncethin	Memorial Ground
Wattstown	40 – 15	Trefil	Glan-Yr-Afon

=== Final ===
Team 1	Score	Team 2	Venue
Cambrian Welfare	29 – 18	Wattstown	Millennium Stadium

Quarter-finals
24 January 2009
Penlan	5
Cambrian Welfare	10
24 January 2009
Llandrindod Wells	0
Bryncethin	33
24 January 2009
Wattstown	15
Caerleon	3
24 January 2009
Blackwood Stars	13
Trefil	15

Semi-finals
21 February 2009 - Memorial Ground
Cambrin Welfare	19
Bryncethin	18
21 February 2009 - Glan-Yr-Afon
Wattstown	40
Trefil	15

Final
18 April 2009 - Millennium Stadium
Cambrian Welfare	29
Wattstown	18

Preceded by 2007–08	Worthingtons Districts Cup; 2008-09	Succeeded by Incumbent
