= Max Williams (rugby union) =

Welsh rugby union footballer (born 1998)

- Born: Max Williams; 2 April 1998 (age 28) Lagos, Nigeria
- Height: 195 cm (6 ft 5 in)
- Weight: 104 kg (16 st 5 lb)

Rugby union career
- Current team: Dragons
Senior career
| Years | Team | Apps | (Points) |
| 2017- | Dragons | 22 | (0) |
- Correct as of 28 Nov 2020 (UTC)

Max Williams (born 2 April 1998) is a Welsh rugby union player who plays for Dragons regional team as a lock forward.

Williams made his debut for the Dragons regional team in 2017 having previously played for Caerleon RFC and Ebbw Vale RFC.
