= Tommy Scourfield =

Wales dual-code rugby international footballer

- Born: Thomas Brinley Scourfield; 26 February 1909 Pontypridd, Wales
- Died: 14 February 1976 (aged 66) Saskatoon, Saskatchewan, Canada
- Occupation(s): labourer, groundsman

Rugby union career
- Position: Full back
Amateur team(s)
Years	Team	Apps	(Points)
- Ynysybwl RFC
- Torquay RFC
- London Welsh RFC
- Devon
International career
Years	Team	Apps	(Points)
1930	Wales	1	(0)
- Rugby league career

Playing information
- Position: Backs
Club
Years	Team	Pld	T	G	FG	P
1935	Huddersfield
Representative
Years	Team	Pld	T	G	FG	P
1935	Wales	1				0

Thomas Scourfield (26 February 1909 – 14 February 1976) was a Welsh dual code rugby international full back who played club rugby for Ynysybwl and Torquay as an amateur rugby union player and played professional rugby league with Huddersfield. He won a single international cap with both the league and union Wales teams.

== Rugby union career ==
Scourfield was born in Pontypridd in 1909 before moving to Ynysybwl. In 1930 Scourfield was selected for his one and only appearance for Wales in a game against France as part of the 1930 Five Nations Championship. Under the captaincy of Guy Morgan, Scourfield made the trip to Paris to play the French at Stade Colombes. The game was an extremely bad-tempered affair from a French team well known throughout the 1930s for their rough play. The game took a turn for the worse when Scourfield collected a loose ball from the back and kicked it into touch. One of the French players who was chasing the ball, ignored the fact that the ball was cleared, continued his race towards Scourfield and punched him in the head. Later on Bert Day, the Welsh hooker, was kicked in the face requiring nine stitches. When Welsh forward Tom Arthur retaliated on the wrong French player, the game fell into running fist fights, with the referee having to halt the game on several occasions. Wales won the game 11–0, but Scourfield did not represent Wales at rugby union again.

== Rugby league career ==
In 1932 Scourfield turned his back on the amateur rugby union game by turning professional with Huddersfield. His first appearance for the club was against Bradford Northern on 26 November 1932, and in 1933 he won a Cup Final winners medal against Warrington, in front of a record crowd of nearly 42,000 people. Tommy Scourfield played fullback in Huddersfield's 8–11 defeat by Castleford in the 1934–35 Challenge Cup Final at Wembley Stadium, London on Saturday 4 May 1935, in front of a crowd of 39,000. He won his only international cap for the Wales league team in 1935 in an encounter with England at Liverpool.

== Bibliography ==
- Smith, David; Williams, Gareth (1980). Fields of Praise: The Official History of The Welsh Rugby Union. Cardiff: University of Wales Press. ISBN 0-7083-0766-3.
