= Bob Evans (rugby union) =

British Lions & Wales international rugby union footballers

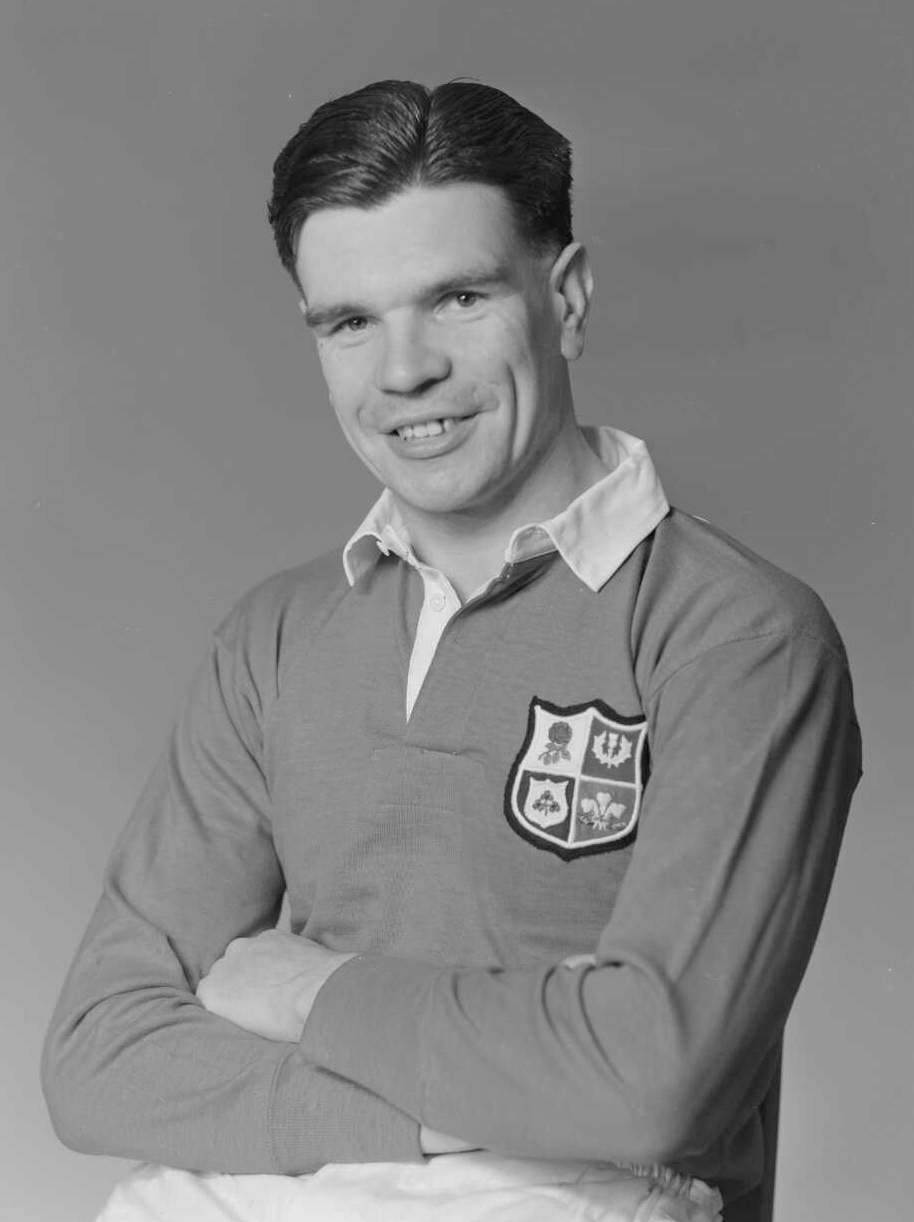
- Evans in New Zealand in 1950
- Born: Robert Thomas Evans; 16 February 1921 Rhymney, Wales
- Died: 14 April 2003 (aged 82) Abergavenny, Wales
- Height: 6 ft 0 in (1.83 m)
- Weight: 13 st 8 lb (86 kg; 190 lb)
- School: Rhymney School
- Occupation: police officer

Rugby union career
- Position: Flanker
Amateur team(s)
Years	Team	Apps	(Points)
- Abergavenny RFC
- Rhymney RFC
1945-1952	Newport RFC		
–	Monmouthshire		
International career
Years	Team	Apps	(Points)
1947-1951	Wales	10	(3)
1950	British Lions	6	(0)

Robert Thomas Evans (16 February 1921 – 14 April 2003) was a Welsh rugby union flanker who played club rugby for Newport and county rugby for Monmouthshire. He played ten internationals for Wales, and was selected for the British Lions playing in all six tests of the 1950 tour of Australia and New Zealand.

Evans was a hard tackling flanker, but his skill was seen in his intelligent defensive positioning. He would often sit behind the three midfield players in offence to ensure that if passing movements broke down the opposition could not counterattack. He specialised in subduing fly-half play and would often disrupt opposing midfield trios into poor positions causing errors in play without even engaging them.

== Rugby career ==
Evans won a Welsh Secondary Schools cap while at Rhymney Secondary School, and after leaving school joined the Monmouthshire Police. In 1943 he joined the Royal Air Force and played rugby for several unit teams. After he was demobbed, he rejoined the police force and was elected captain of his local rugby club at Rhymney. He was invited to play for Newport against Swansea in 1945 in a game at St Helens, and joined the black and ambers that season.

On 22 March 1947, Evans was selected for Wales against France at Stade Colombes. Evans was a late substitute, replacing the injured Ossie Williams, and would represent Wales on ten occasions, scoring his one and only try during his second game, in a match against Ireland.

== International matches played ==
Wales

- England 1950, 1951
- France 1947, 1950, 1951
- Ireland 1947, 1950, 1951
- Scotland 1950, 1951
