= Garin Jenkins =

Wales international rugby union footballer

- Born: Garin Richard Jenkins; 18 August 1966 (age 60) Ynysybwl, Wales
- Height: 175 cm (5 ft 9 in)
- Weight: 107 kg (16 st 12 lb)
- School: Hawthorn Comprehensive School
- Notable relative: Owen Jenkins (son)

Rugby union career
- Position: Hooker
Senior career
Years	Team	Apps	(Points)
	Ynysybwl	?	(?)
1988	Taupo United	?	(?)
1988–1989	Pontypridd	7	(?)
1989–1991	Pontypool	?	(?)
1991–2002	Swansea	224	(144)
Provincial / State sides
Years	Team	Apps	(Points)
1988	King Country	?	(?)
International career
Years	Team	Apps	(Points)
1991–2000	Wales	58	(10)

Garin Jenkins (born 18 August 1966) is a Welsh former professional rugby union player who played as a hooker. He earned 58 caps for the Wales national team between 1991 and 2000, the most by a hooker until he was surpassed by Matthew Rees in June 2014, and played at the 1991, 1995 and 1999 Rugby World Cups.

At club level, he began his career with Ynysybwl, and in 1988 he spent time with Taupo United and the King Country provincial side in New Zealand. He returned to Wales and played for Pontypridd during the 1988–89 season. He found playing time hard to come by due to the presence of incumbent hooker Phil John, and only made seven appearances before moving to Pontypool at the end of the season. After two years in Pontypool, he moved to Swansea, where he played for 12 years before a spinal injury forced him into retirement.

His son Owen is also a rugby player.
