= 2007–08 Worthington's District Cup =

The 2007–08 Worthington's District Cup is the national Rugby Union district cup competition of Wales. It is the 35th annual Welsh Districts cup.

Cambrian Welfare RFC were the winners of the event, capturing their second title after previously winning in 1996–97.

== 2006-07 final ==
The 2006-07 Final took place at the Millennium Stadium, Cardiff. The final was competed between Blackwood Stars RFC and Bryncethin RFC. The final score was 28 - 18 to Blackwood Stars RFC who won the competition for the second time.

== Matches ==
=== Round 3 ===
Home team	Score	Away team
Abertysswg	24 - 0	Rhayader
Beaufort	0 - 32	Wattstown
Blackwood Stars	31 - 24	Llanrumney
Caereinon Old Boys	0 - 10	Abertridwr
Caerleon	76 - 0	Shotton Steel
Cambrian Welfare	Walkover	Wick
Cimla	25 - 27	Llandrindod Wells
Crickhowell	25 - 24	Rogerstone
Flint	3 - 23	Fall Bay
Glyncoch	67 - 5	Tregaron
Hafodyrynys	7 - 9	Bryncethin
Llangadog	20 - 23	Markham
Llangollen	10 - 17	Ynysowen
Pantyffynnon	75 - 0	Forgeside
Penlan	43 - 19	Machynlleth
Trefil	20 - 17	Bro Ffestiniog

=== Round 4 ===
Home team	Score	Away team
Abertysswg	13 - 7	Crickhowell
Blackwood Stars	5 - 7	Trefil
Caerleon	3 - 5	Abertridwr
Glyncoch	20 - 5	Llandrindod Wells
Markham	43 - 10	Pantyffynnon
Penlan	48 - 10	Fall Bay
Wattstown	10 - 29	Cambrian Welfare
Ynysowen	6 - 27	Bryncethin

=== Finals ===
==== Quarter-finals ====
Home team	Score	Away team
Bryncethin	17 - 15	Penlan
Cambrian Welfare	6 - 0	Glyncoch
Abertridwr	? - ?	Markham
Trefil	17 - 3	Abertysswg

==== Semi-finals ====
Team 1	Score	Team 2	Venue
Bryncethin	15 - 13	Markham	Blackwood
Cambrian Welfare	18 - 12	Trefil	Mountain Ash

==== Final ====
Team 1	Score	Team 2	Venue
Bryncethin	8 - 20	Cambrian Welfare	Millennium Stadium

Quarter-finals
Bryncethin	17
Penlan	15
Abertridwg	?
Markham	?
Cambrian Welfare	6
Glyncoch	0
Trefil	17
Abertysswg	3

Semi-finals
Bryncethin	15
Markham	13
Cambrian Welfare	18
Trefil	12

Final
Bryncethin	8
Cambrian Welfare	20

Preceded by 2006-07	Worthingtons Districts Cup; 2007-08	Succeeded by 2008-09
