= Rhymney RFC =

Welsh rugby union club, based in Rhymney

(Wales) Rhymney RFC
- Full name: Rhymney Rugby Football Club
- Nickname: The Brewers
- Founded: 1882 (c)
- Location: Rhymney, Wales
- Ground: The War Memorial Park
- President: Phil Atkinson
- Coach: Lee Pearson Creighton Rees
- Captain: Tyler Evans
- League: WRU Division Two East
- 2024/25: 1st
Team kit

Official website
- www.rhymneyrfc.org.uk

Rhymney Rugby Football Club is a Welsh rugby union club based in Rhymney in Wales. The senior team presently plays in the Welsh Rugby Union Division Two East league. Rhymney is a member of the Welsh Rugby Union and is a feeder club for the Newport Gwent Dragons.

== History ==
Rugby union was first played in Rhymney in the late 19th century, though the exact date is unverified. The earliest reported match appeared in "The Western Mail" with a match against Pontlottyn on the 23rd of September 1882 at the Rhymney Cricket and Football Field. Rhymney won by 3 goals against 2 touches downs. The earliest international player from the town was Bill Evans, who played for Wales against Ireland in 1882 and Scotland in 1883. The earliest known photograph of a Rhymney team, is dated circa 1887. In 1910, Rhymney RFC applied for and was granted membership of the Welsh Rugby Union, and was allowed to play in competitive matches with other teams in the area, primarily in the Monmouthshire League.

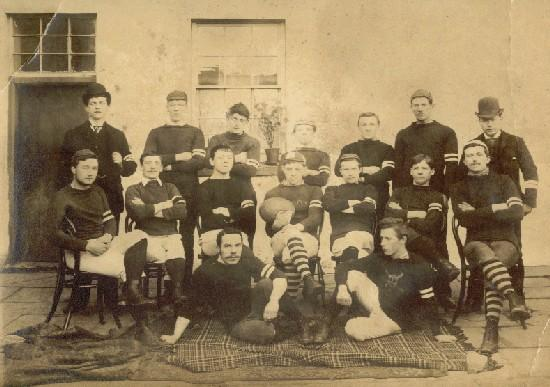
The 1887 Rhymney Stars

Like many Welsh clubs in the depression hit 1920s, Rhymney RFC disbanded in 1924 and lost its WRU membership. In 1933, Rhymney RFC reformed and in 1945 regained WRU status. During the 1945 season, Rhymney lost probably their greatest player, Bob Evans, to the top tier team Newport. Club captain Evans went on to represent Wales on ten occasions and in 1950 played for the British Lions.

A period of growth during the 1950s saw the acquisition of a new playing field, viewing stand and the club's first official clubhouse. In 1976, Rhymney hosted Slava Moscow, the first time a Russian team played in Great Britain. Rhymney won 10-8.

== Notable players ==
- (Wales) Bill Evans (2 caps)
- (Wales) Bob Evans (10 caps)
- (Wales) Tom James (9 caps)
- (Wales) Gareth S. Kearney
- (Wales) Berwyn Jones (3 caps)
