= Gilfach Goch RFC =

Welsh rugby union club, based in Gilfach Goch

(Wales) Gilfach Goch RFC
- Full name: Gilfach Goch Rugby Football Club
- Nickname(s): Gowch, Gulch, Gil
- Founded: 1889; 137 years ago
- Location: Gilfach Goch, Wales
- Ground(s): Welfare Park, Gilfach Goch
- Chairman: Ian Welsh
- President: Howard Mainwaring
- Director of Rugby: Neil Elliott
- Coach: Iestyn Williams
- Captain: Nathan Walters
- League: WRU Division One East
- 2011–12: 4th
Team kit

Official website
- www.ggrfc.co.uk

Gilfach Goch Rugby Football Club is a rugby union team from the village of Gilfach Goch, South Wales. Gilfach Goch RFC was established in 1889, has been a member of the Welsh Rugby Union since 1956 and is a feeder club for the Cardiff Blues.

The clubhouse, in High Street Gilfach Goch, has been the club's base for the past 40 years. Gilfach Goch RFC is a community club, and has over 170 players currently involved in teams run by the club. These roots are continually developing, especially with the development of the Junior section of the club. The club currently runs the following teams :- 1st XV, 2nd XV, Youth XV and many mini rugby teams from Under 8's up to Youth age.

== Club honours ==
- 1996/97 WRU Division Six Central - Champions
- 1996/97 Glamorgan County Silver Ball Trophy - Winners
- 1997/98 Glamorgan County Silver Ball Trophy - Winners
- 2003/04 WRU Division Three South East - Champions
- 2007/08 WRU Division Three South East - Play Off Winners
- 2009/10 WRU Division Two East - Champions

== Notable former players ==
The following players have represented Gilfach Goch and been capped at international level.

- (Wales) Corey Domachowski
- (Wales) Ian Hall
- (Wales) Mathew Back
- (Wales) Jason Lewis
- (Wales) Andrew Williams (Rugby League Cap)
