= Tondu RFC =

Welsh rugby union club, based in Aberkenfig

(Wales) Tondu RFC
- Full name: Tondu Rugby Football Club
- Nickname: The Waterwheelers
- Founded: 1880; 146 years ago
- Location: Aberkenfig, Wales
- Ground: Pandy Park
- President: Mr Mark Thomas
- Coach(es): Mathew Tatchel, Hywel Davies, Aaron Warner, Geraint Long, Simon King & James Goss
- Captain: Sam Grabham
- League: WRU Championship
- 2024/25: 9th
Team kit

Official website
- tondu.rfc.wales

Tondu Rugby Football Club is a rugby union team from the village of Aberkenfig, South Wales. They presently play in the Welsh Rugby Union Championship and are a feeder club for the Ospreys.

During the early 1990s Tondu RFC dominated the Glamorgan County Silver Ball competition, winning the trophy in 1991, 1992 and 1993. Tondu are the joint leading winners of the competition having now won it on four occasions.

An ad first appeared in "The Western Mail" on 22 November 1879, announcing the formation of the Tondu Football Club.

== Club badge ==
The club badge consists of a shield housing three Celtic crosses and a waterwheel symbolising the water mill that once stood on the River Ogmore.

== Club honours ==
- Glamorgan County Silver Ball Trophy - 1986-87 Winners
- Glamorgan County Silver Ball Trophy - 1990-91 Winners
- Glamorgan County Silver Ball Trophy - 1991-92 Winners
- Glamorgan County Silver Ball Trophy - 1993-94 Winners
- District Div 1 cup winners

2023/24

- Welsh youth cup winners - 1989/90 2011/12 2022/23
- Welsh youth plate winners - 2017/18

Osprey youth league winners - 2021/22 2022/23

== Notable former players ==
see also Category:Tondu RFC players

The following are former Tondu players who have been capped at international level.

- (Wales) Keith Bradshaw
- (Wales) J. P. R. Williams
- (Wales) Neil Boobyer
- (Wales) Ian Boobyer
- (Wales) Gavin Thomas
- (Wales) Lee Byrne
- (Wales) Owen Watkin
- (United States) Ryan Matyas
