= Caerleon R.F.C. =

(Wales) Caerleon R.F.C.
- Full name: Caerleon Rugby Football Club
- Nickname: Helmets
- Founded: 1970
- Location: Caerleon, Newport
- Ground: The Broadway
- Chairman: N Wilkinson
- Coach: Nigel (Wiffer) Smith
- League: WRU Division One East
- 2017-18: 10th
Team kit

Official website
- caerleon.rfc.wales

Caerleon Rugby Football Club is a Welsh rugby union club based in Caerleon on the northern outskirts of Newport in South Wales. The club is a large community with teams at most age levels, as well as the First XV and a Seconds side known as "The Helmets". This stems from the club's logo – the helmet of a Roman centurion.

The club enjoys a rivalry with its close neighbour Newport HSOB RFC.

== History ==
The first rugby club to come to Caerleon was Caerleon FC and they were formed in May 1879.

Another club was formed in August 1902, running teams in both rugby and association football. The rugby team entered the Newport and District League, but folded in September of the same year. The club's association football section lived on as Caerleon A.F.C.

On the first Saturday of season 1970–71 Caerleon RFC started as a Newport and District Rugby Team and quickly became one of the leading clubs in the Newport and District Union. Eleven years later, running three Senior Sides, Caerleon moved into their newly built and current clubhouse at the Broadway, Caerleon. The club has supplied a large number of players to both Newport and Gwent Districts and is a Junior Club, with two Senior Sides, Youth, Junior and Minis. Caerleon continues to supply representatives to the Newport & District side, the most recent Welsh District cap was back row forward Christopher Harris in 2006. Others Welsh caps include; Gareth McCarthy, Nigel Smith, brothers John & Adrian Jones, Martin Lewis, Andrew Rice, Ian Cole, Darren Gregg and Nigel Miggins.

In its comparatively brief history the club has gained honours including the Gwent Premier League title, the Newport and District Cup and reaching the Worthington Cup Final (now replaced by the Swalec Bowl) winning once and being runners-up twice. In July 2007, it was confirmed by the WRU that the Gwent Premier League teams would make up a League Division 6 for the following season. In 2011–12, Caerleon RFC won the top place in the division.

== Notable former players ==
See also Category:Caerleon RFC players

- (Wales) Lewis Robling
- (Wales) Max Williams
- (Wales) Angus O'Brien
