= Llantrisant RFC =

Welsh rugby union club, based in Llantrisant

(Wales) Llantrisant RFC
- Full name: Llantrisant Rugby Football Club
- Nickname: The Black Army
- Founded: 1888; 138 years ago
- Location: Llantrisant, Wales
- Ground: Cefn Mabley
- League: WRU Division Two East
- 7th
Team kit

Official website
- llantrisant.rfc.wales

Llantrisant Rugby Football Club is a Welsh rugby union team based in Llantrisant in the county of Rhondda Cynon Taff. Llantrisant RFC plays in the Welsh Rugby Union, Division Two Central East League and is a feeder club for the Cardiff Blues.

The nickname 'The Black Army' relates to the longbowmen of Llantrisant who sided victoriously with Edward, the Black Prince at the Battle of Crecy.

== Club badge ==
The club badge is a representation of the Seal of the Llantrisant Town Trust representing the arms of the Consul, De Clare and Despenser families who had historical connections with Llantrisant.

== Club honours ==
- Brewers Cup 1981-82 - Winners
- Glamorgan County Silver Ball Trophy 1988-89 - Winners
- Glamorgan County Silver Ball Trophy 1993-94 - Winners
- WRU Division Two East Champions 2006-07 (Promoted)
