= Merthyr RFC =

Welsh rugby union club, based in Merthyr Tydfil

(Wales) Merthyr RFC
- Full name: Merthyr Rugby Football Club
- Nickname: Ironmen
- Founded: 1876; 150 years ago
- Location: Merthyr Tydfil, Wales
- Ground: The Wern (Capacity: 4,500)
- President: Sir Stanley Thomas
- Coach(es): Garry Horrigan, Lee Jarvis, Dale McIntosh, Jamie Ringer
- Captain(s): Craig Locke, James Howe
- League: Welsh Premier Division
- 2024-2025: Welsh Premier Division, 1st
Team kit

Official website
- merthyr.rfc.wales

Merthyr RFC is a Welsh rugby union club based in Merthyr Tydfil in South Wales. Merthyr RFC are members of the Welsh Rugby Union, playing in the Principality Premiership, and are a feeder club for Cardiff Rugby.

== Early history ==
Merthyr's first reported match was an association football match played on 14/09/1876, when Merthyr lost 3-0 to Mr. Lloyd's School (Merthyr). The first public rugby game involving Merthyr was on 23 November 1876 against a side from Brecon. The result is believed to have been a draw. Merthyr RFC are recognised as one of the eleven clubs present on 12 April 1881 for the formation of the Welsh Rugby Union. The club, along with Brecon, Pontypool, Llandovery College, Lampeter College and Llandeilo then inaugurated the South Wales Cup competition in the 1877-78 season.

During these early years Merthyr RFC played at the Plymouth Ground at Pentrebach and were known as Merthyr Alexandra.

Around 1889 it seems Merthyr disbanded, mainly due to difficulty in being able to obtain a rugby ground. The club were "reorganised" in October 1889 and were now using the Penydarren Park.

Following the First World War the Club played at Gwynnes Field, Cefn Coed and also at Penydarren Park although during the Second World War there was very little rugby played in Merthyr, a situation reflected throughout Wales. However, in 1948 a meeting governed by Cyril Williams, Monty Warrington and Ron Gethin was enthusiastically supported and the game of rugby union returned to Merthyr Tydfil. The club played out of Dix's field, Danydarren, and then on to Glyndyrus field Abercanaid, before moving to the current ground, the Wern in Ynysfach in 1958.

In September 1960 the New Clubhouse opened in Ynysfach, and two years later, Merthyr Youth were formed.

== Recent history ==
Merthyr RFC played Amateur District Rugby in the Rhondda and East Glamorgan District until they defeated Mold RFC at Abercynon to secure promotion and entry to the Fifth Division of the Heineken League under the Captaincy of Craig Dummett in 1993/4. Promotion immediately followed from the fifth to the fourth, then the third to the first in successive years (The two division jump caused by WRU restructuring of the league). Merthyr remained in the First Division for six seasons before being relegated to Division 2 following a players' strike. It took three seasons to achieve promotion back to the first division.

In 2013-14, the Ironmen completed a Double under the Captaincy of Steve Lang and coached by former Wales International Lee Jarvis. They won the League Division 1 East title, securing their promotion to the WRU Championship, and also won the SWALEC Plate Final 29-26, against Rhiwbina at the Millennium Stadium, Cardiff.

In 2015-16, Merthyr RFC enjoyed further success by winning the WRU SWALEC Championship, gaining promotion to the WRU Principality Premiership.

In 2016-17, the Ironmen completed a remarkable revolution by achieving their most successful season to date. The club won the WRU Principality Premiership during their inaugural season, with the final played against Aberavon RFC. They also reached the semi-final of the SWALEC Cup, eventually losing to RGC 1404.

== Kit manufacturers and sponsors ==
Years	Kit Manufacturer	Main Sponsor
2005-06	KooGa	Redrow Homes
2006-08	KooGa	Garth Bakery
2008-09	Canterbury	Jobs@Pertemps
2009-10	Canterbury	None
2010-14	Canterbury	JNP Legal
2014	Macron	Tetley's Brewery
2014-16	Macron	Miller Argent
2016-	Macron	Leisuretime

== Notable former players ==
See also Category:Merthyr RFC players

- (Wales) Andy Powell
- (Wales) Jonathan Bryant
- (Wales) Tom James
- (Wales) Kristian Dacey
- (Wales) Robert Sidoli
- (England) Ben Morgan

== Club honours ==
- Division 1 East champions: 2013-14
- SWALEC Plate winners: 2013-14
- WRU Championship Winners: 2016
- Principality Premiership: 2017, 2018, 2019, 2025, 2026
- WRU National Cup: 2018

== See also ==
- South Wales Ironmen
