= Fleur De Lys RFC =

(Wales) Fleur De Lys RFC
- Full name: Fleur De Lys Rugby Football Club
- Nickname(s): Flower
- Founded: 1966
- Location: Fleur De Lys, Wales
- Ground(s): Trelyn Park (Capacity: 5000)
- Coach(es): Shaun Pugh (Head Coach); Greg Callow (Backs Coach); Gareth Watkins(Team Manager)
- League(s): WRU Division 3 East
- 2022/23: 3rd – Promoted
Team kit

Official website
- fleurdelys.rfc.wales

Fleur De Lys RFC is a Welsh rugby union club based in south-east Wales and are a feeder club for Newport Gwent Dragons. The 1st XV Team currently play in Division 3 East

== History ==
Fleur De Lys RFC reformed into their current guise in 1966. In 1992 they obtained full membership of the Welsh Rugby Union.

The club since 1992 has had some notable success, with the senior team gaining successive promotions in 2002, 2003 and 2004. They attainted their highest league position in the 2006/07 season finishing 5th in Division One East. They beat some high-profile teams along the way including Pontypool. They were relegated the following season after finishing 11th, and again in the following season from Division 2 East.

'Flower' as they are known in rugby circles, bounced back to winning ways in the 2009/10 season and were promoted to Division Two East finishing as Champions of Division 3 East.

After three seasons in Division 2 East, the club were moved into the newly restructured Division One East for the forthcoming 2014/15 season.

Club Captain since 2022/2023 season is Macauley Dimmick.

The club has previously run youth & 2nd XV teams to varying success.

== Sporting honours ==
- WRU Division Four East 2000/2001 – Runner Up
- WRU Division Four East 2001/2002 – 3rd Promoted
- WRU Division Three East 2002/2003 – 4th Promoted
- WRU Division Two East 2003/2004 – Runner Up Promoted
- WRU Division One 2004/2005 – 9th
- WRU Division One 2005/2006 – 11th (no relegation)
- WRU Division One East 2006/2007 – 5th
- WRU Division Three East 2009/2010—Champions
