= Nantyglo RFC =

Welsh rugby union club, based in Nantyglo, Blaenau Gwent

(Wales) Nantyglo RFC
- Full name: Nantyglo Rugby Football Club
- Nickname: The Glo
- Founded: 1962
- Location: Nantyglo, Wales
- Ground(s): Banna Park, Nantyglo
- Coach: Jason Williams
- Captain: Nick Phippen
- League: WRU Division One East
Team kit

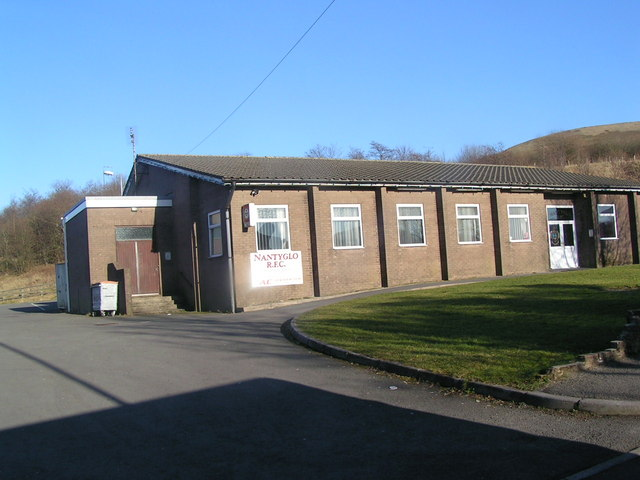

Nantyglo Rugby Football Club is a rugby union team from Nantyglo Wales. The club is a member of the Welsh Rugby Union and is a feeder club for the Newport Gwent Dragons.

The club's most notable player is Tom Clapp, who in 1887 and 1888 captained the Welsh team on three occasions, including their first win over old rivals Scotland. Whereas most lower level clubs can only attribute their links to first class players before the individual was capped, Clapp played his first three matches as a full Welsh international while still turning out for Nantyglo.

The club recently raised money for an ex player who had suffered severe spinal damage and had spent months in hospital. Some squad members agreed to be photographed for a 'naked calendar' which proved to be very popular.

In recent years the team has been very successful and in 2013 Nantyglo finished unbeaten to win Division 5 East and gain promotion to Division 4 East. The team also achieved a good cup run, narrowly missing out on an appearance at The Millennium Stadium, Cardiff. Nantyglo have won back-to-back titles since 2013, most recently clinching the 2014/2015 league title on the final game of the season against Brynmawr RFC.

Nantyglo's local rivals are Blaina RFC and Brynmawr RFC.
