= Worthington Welsh Districts Cup =

The Worthington Welsh Districts Cup (previously the Welsh Brewers Cup) was a national rugby union competition in Wales that ran for 36 years, sponsored most recently by Worthington Brewery. The 1990 winner’s are missing Hartridge HSOB bear Bala in the final

== Background ==
The Welsh Districts Cup involved an annual knock-out competition involving all rugby union clubs of the 12 districts of the Welsh District Rugby Union (WDRU). It first took place in 1974. The finals took place at Cardiff Arms Park or the Millennium Stadium, Cardiff. The first competition was won by Girling RFC (Cwmbran), who beat Baglan RFC 16-3.

The competition initially involved 128 of the approximately 300 clubs, but in the early 1980s 80 clubs were admitted to the main Wales Rugby Union (WRU).

Worthington Brewery began their sponsorship of the competition in 1998.

The last Welsh Districts Cup took place in the 2008/9 season, after which time the remaining Welsh Districts clubs were given full membership of the WRU. Cambrian Welfare RFC were the winners of the 2009 final, beating Wattstown RFC 29-18 at the Millennium Stadium.

Wattstown RFC have appeared in the most finals playing in 5 which included 4 finals in a golden period for the club of 5 years - 1993, 1994, 1996, 1997, and 2009.

== Previous winners ==
Year	Winners	Runners up	Score
1974	Girling RFC	Baglan RFC	16 - 3
1975	Girling RFC	St Joseph RFC	6 - 3
1976	Cross Keys RFC	Caldicott RFC	9 - 6
1977	Cardiff Internationals	Cross Keys RFC	16 - 3
1978	Rumney RFC	Nantyglo RFC	25 - 9
1979	Rumney RFC	Nantyglo RFC	18 - 10
1980	Tondu RFC	Rumney RFC	15 - 10
1981			
1982			
1983			
1984			
1985			
1986			
1987	CIAC	Hartridge HSOB	26-3
1988			
1989	St Albans	Hartridge HSOB	13-10
1990	Hartridge HSOB	Newtown	24-18
1991	Fairwater (Cardiff)		
1992	St Albans RFC	Fairwater RFC	21-20
1993	Birchgrove RFC	Wattstown RFC	
1994	Wattstown RFC	Hartridge HSOB	15-6
1995			
1996	St Albans RFC	Wattstown RFC	15-12
1997	Cambrian Welfare RFC	Wattstown RFC	18-11
1998			
1999	"Cefn Fforest RFC"		
2000	Fairwater (Cardiff)	Nant Conwy	16 - 6
2001	Penallta RFC	Beaufort	36 - 19
2002	Blackwood Stars	Llanrumney	21 - 20
2003	Clwb Rygbi Cymru Caerdydd	Glyncorrwg	24 - 20
2004	Blackwood Stars		
2005			
2006	Bryncethin RFC	Clwb Rygbi Cymru Caerdydd	28 - 15
2007		Bryncethin RFC	
2008	Cambrian Welfare RFC	Bryncethin RFC	
2009	Cambrian Welfare RFC	Wattstown RFC	29 - 18

== See also ==
- 2007–08 Worthington's District Cup
- 2008–09 Worthington's District Cup
