= Penallta RFC =

Welsh rugby union club, based in Ystrad Mynach

(Wales) Penallta RFC
- Full name: Penallta Rugby Football Club
- Nickname: The Pitmen
- Founded: 1952; 74 years ago
- Location: Ystrad Mynach, Wales
- Ground: Ystrad Fawr (Capacity: approx. 200)
- President: Allan Rogers
- Coach(es): Jack Condy, Ben Flower, Andrew Jenkins
- League: WRU Championship East
- 2023/2024: 11th
| 1st kit | 2nd kit |

Official website
- www.penalltarfc.co.uk

Penallta Rugby Football Club is a Welsh rugby union team based in Ystrad Mynach in the county borough of Caerphilly. Penallta RFC is a member of the Welsh Rugby Union and is a feeder club for the Newport Gwent Dragons.

== History ==
Penallta Rugby Football Club is based in Ystrad Mynach. The rugby club was formed by a group of miners from Penallta colliery in 1952 and moved from a number of different social addresses until it settled at Ystrad Fawr, hosting both its club and playing ground there. On 1 November 1991 Penallta Colliery shut down but the RFC continued to play under its name. In 2008 Penallta moved from Ystrad Fawr to new headquarters across the road at Trinity Fields. The historic land of Ystrad Fawr, which featured listed buildings and sports playing fields, was bulldozed in 2008 to make way for the new Ystrad Mynach Hospital.

The club colours are blue and gold and the first team are known as the Pitmen, the club being immensely proud of its mining heritage.

Penallta became a full Welsh Rugby Union member in 2004 and since then it has won Divisions 1, 3, 4 and 5 South East, plus the Silver Ball trophy in 2005 and 2015, and three Welsh Plate titles in 2012, 2017 and 2022. Penallta began its new status as a WRU club in Division 5 side in September 2004. In April 2008, following four straight promotions, the club was promoted to Division 1 East. The club enjoyed an incredible rise through the Welsh leagues system given the club only became a WRU-affiliated member club four years prior to playing in Division 1. Since 2022, Penallta achieved an even higher playing level, competing in WRU Championship East.

Penallta RFC was a Junior Union club from its inception in 1952 until 2004. One of Penallta's biggest Junior Union achievements was winning the Worthington Welsh 'Brewers' Cup in 2001. It was the only time the club won the cup during its junior union history.

In 2012 Penallta returned to the Millennium Stadium and won the Swalec Plate against North Wales side Nant Conwy. Captain Kieran Mahoney lifted the trophy to cap a season during which Penallta embarked on an 18-match unbeaten run, narrowly finishing runner-up to rivals Ystrad Rhondda in Division 2 East.

The players who emerged from Penallta’s ‘Class of 2014’ brought the club more success, with the Pitmen winning Division 1 East in 2015 and 2022, plus two more Welsh Plate titles at the Principality Stadium in 2017 and 2022. The Pitmen also won the Glamorgan Mid Districts Cup final in 2015, beating Bedlinog in the final at Sardis Road.

The Pitmen lost the Welsh Plate final against Bedlinog in 2016. Penallta Youth lost the Welsh Youth Cup final in 2015, and then narrowly lost the Welsh Plate Cup final against Cardiff Quins in 2019. All of the finals were played at the National Stadium, now known as the Principality Stadium in Cardiff, meaning that - as a club - Penallta’s senior and youth sides played in a remarkable eight National Stadium finals in twenty years.

A club proud of its social camaraderie, Penallta has run a 2nd team for over 50 years. The 2nd team is officially called Penallta Athletic but is fondly known as ‘F Troop’. Penallta Athletic won the Keith Jones Cup in 2004 and the Mid District Premier League in 2006. In 2018 Penallta Athletic was invited to join the WRU Conference, a league consisting of second sides in Wales. Penallta Athletic, coached by former Pontypridd and Ebbw Vale scrum half Gareth Bisp, won the inaugural league title and went on to win the Mid District Cup the same season, capping a successful double.

Mike Voyle, a resident of Ystrad Mynach, is the only Penallta player to have represented Wales. He won 21 caps as a tight forward between 1997 and 2001. Elliott Dee played junior and youth team rugby at Penallta before representing Wales more than 50 times, but he never played senior rugby for the club.

Penallta's most capped player is Lee Acreman, with over 600 1st team appearances for the club. The most successful player in Penallta's history is Craig Phillips who captained the 1st team on six occasions and won the Player of the Year award on no less than five occasions, his career lasting between 1976 and 1992. Later, Huw Stevens, a Number 8 like Craig Phillips, equalled the captaincy record by captaining Penallta on six occasions between 1997 and 2007.

Current ex Penallta players who have gone on to play for higher-placed clubs include Dai Flanagan (Cardiff Blues/Ospreys/Llanelli RFC), Gareth Davies (Wales 7s/ Cardiff Blues/Cardiff RFC), Steffan Jones (Dragons/Crosskeys RFC/Bedford Blues), Elliot Dee (Dragons), Scott Matthews (Dragons/Crosskeys RFC), Jack Condy (Scarlets), Arwel Robson (Newport RFC / Dragons), Ellis Shipp Dragons, Wales U20s), Sam Scarfe (Dragons) and Shaun Powell (Cardiff RFC).

Penallta is also known for its excellent matchday programmes, written by Mike Guilfoyle and Martyn Rowe. Extracts from the programmes were made into a book in 2007 called "Shaking the Tree Boss - Portraits of a Welsh Rugby Club".

== Senior Club honours ==
- 2021–22 WRU National Plate - Winners
- 2016–17 WRU National Plate - Winners
- 2014–15 WRU Division One East Champions
- 2014–15 Glamorgan County Silver Ball Trophy - Winners
- 2011–12 Swalec Plate - winners
- 2007–08 WRU Division Two East - runners up
- 2006–07 WRU Division Three East Champions
- 2006–07 Glamorgan County Silver Ball Trophy - finalists
- 2005–06 WRU Division Four South East - Champions
- 2004–05 WRU Division Five South East - Champions
- 2004–05 Glamorgan County Silver Ball Trophy - Winners

Penallta Storm Rugby League

Penallta RFC has run Junior Rugby League division since 2009 and are part of the Welsh Conference Junior League

- 2011 - Storm U17s Rugby League - Welsh Champions
- 2011 - Storm U13s Rugby League - Welsh Champions
- 2010 - Storm U17s Rugby League - Welsh Champions
- 2010 - Storm U15s Rugby League - Welsh Champions
- 2009 - Storm U17s Rugby League - Welsh Champions

== Notable former players ==
- (Wales) Mike Voyle
- (Wales) Elliot Dee
- (Wales) Richard Silver
- (Wales) Buddy Ollie
- (Wales) Dai Winters
