= Newport Saracens RFC =

(Wales) Newport Saracens RFC
- Full name: Newport Saracens Rugby Football Club
- Founded: 1932; 93 years ago
- Location: Maesglas, Newport
- Ground(s): Maesglas Fields
- Chairman: Gary “the sarrie” James
- Coach(es): Pat James, Tom Casey
- League(s): WRU Division 3 East - League B
Team kit

Official website
- www.newportsaracens.co.uk

Newport Saracens RFC are a Welsh rugby union club based in Newport in South Wales. The club is a member of the Welsh Rugby Union and is a feeder club for the Newport Gwent Dragons.

The club was founded in the 1932/33 and after disbanding during the Second World War, with 95% of their team joining HM Armed Forces, reformed for the 1945/46 season. In 2010 the team withdrew from the WRU Division Three East just before the start of the new season. Since then the mighty Saracens got back to back League wins in both the 17/18, 18/19 seasons.

During the 2018 season the Newport Saracens embarked on a different challenge that is the Welsh national 8 ball pool league. They started in the bottom league where they sealed their first victory away at the Columba club. They went into the last game tied 3–3 with their club coaches Jonny 8ball Morris and Patrick the pocket James taking the cues. The game was tense and it came down to a difficult shot on the black. The pool team captain Ian Morgan was a nervous wreck and hid himself in the bathroom at the moment 8ball Morris 'the cut in kid' slid the 8 ball down the middle pocket.

Since then the Sarries pool team has seen their ups and downs with their Achilles heel being female opposition. They are currently at the top of the league after playing one game in the 2019 winter pool. In a clash against new panteg on 10 March 2023, sarries lost 18–12. Notable things from the game was Brad yearsley getting sin binned for a ridiculous, ego driven neck roll which led to panteg taking full advantage and scoring 10 points in his absence. Also, Cam Toland’s pathetic ‘I’ll do what I want’ tactic which ultimately led to gaps in the Saracens back line.

In a shock announcement Som Parselle has come out of retirement, to the delight of the Saracens front row. The news spread through the east leagues like wildfire as Sam “the hitter” Parselle makes a return at hooker. He and the rest of the team hope to see a return to the form seen by all in the 2014/2015 season.

[3]
