= Caerphilly RFC =

Welsh rugby union football club

(Wales) Caerphilly RFC CR Caerffili
- Full name: Caerphilly Rugby Football Club Clwb Rygbi Caerffili
- Nickname: The Cheesemen / The Castlemen
- Founded: 1887
- Location: Caerphilly, Wales
- Ground: The Mollex Stadium (Capacity: 6,000)
- Chairman: Gareth Ashman
- Coach: Gareth Short / Niko Matawalu
- League: WRU Division One East Central
Team kit

Official website
- caerphilly.rfc.wales

Caerphilly Rugby Football Club is a Welsh rugby union team founded in 1887. Their home ground is The Mollex stadium in Caerphilly and their nickname is The Cheesemen. Caerphilly RFC currently play in the WRU Division One East Central and are a feeder club for Dragons RFC.

Caerphilly RFC also run a thriving Mini and Junior Section with teams from Under 6's up to Youth. The Youth compete in the Dragons A League whilst the Seconds (known as the Diamonds) compete in a mid district 2nds league. Caerphilly Rugby Football Club is the largest Community Rugby Club in Wales by participation numbers

== History ==
The club was formed on 17 August 1887, and their first reported match was played on 20 October 1887, when Caerphilly played away to St. Andrew's (Cardiff), winning by 1 goal and 2 minors to 2 tries and 1 minor. Caerphilly played 25 matches in their first season, winning 12, drawing 8, and losing 5. Since then Caerphilly RFC have spent many years in the top divisions of Welsh league rugby. Caerphilly has twice been admitted as members of the WRU, once in 1900 and again in 1955 after the club had disbanded and then reformed.

== Home ground ==
Their home ground, The Mollex Stadium (Virginia Park,) is a small stadium with all-seated stands on either side of the pitch and a non-seated stand at one end of the pitch. The ground has a maximum capacity 6,000. In World War II, German planes bombed Virginia Park, as they incorrectly believed it was being used as an airfield. On 6 May 2017 Caerphilly played host to the PRO 12 match between the Dragons (rugby union) and the Cardiff Blues which was switched from Rodney Parade. The match finished 26–24 to the Blues.

== Recent success ==
Caerphilly made the national Bowl final in the principality stadium on 16 April 2017. The side lost to Shane Williams' Amman United 43-31.

Caerphilly have featured in two recent cup finals, the European Shield Final 2003 (losing to French team Castres Olympique) & the Welsh Cup Final in 2004 (losing to Neath RFC).

The club were also narrow runners up in Division One East in 2007/2008 season.

The club made it to the final of the Worthingtons Mid-District Bowl Final for the 2014/15 season, the final being held at Beddau RFC. Caerphilly lost to Porth RFC 29–23.
