= Nelson RFC =

(Wales) Nelson RFC
- Full name: Nelson Rugby Football Club
- Nickname(s): The Unicorns
- Founded: 1934; 91 years ago
- Location: Nelson, Wales
- Ground(s): The Parc (Capacity: 300)
- League(s): WRU League 1 East
- 2012-13: Div 1 East
Team kit

Official website
- nelsonrfc.mywru.co.uk

Nelson Rugby Football Club is a Welsh rugby union club team based in Nelson, Caerphilly. Today, Nelson RFC plays in the Welsh Rugby Union, Division one East League and is a feeder club for the Newport Gwent Dragons.

Their club badge is a white unicorn on black. Their motto, "Profi Yn Iawn" means 'prove your worth'. The current club captain is Lloyd Ford. Nelson RFC have a thriving mini and junior section, with age groups ranging from U'7's all the way through to U'16's. They are additionally one of the only Rugby Clubs in South Wales who provide rugby for U'12s, U 14s 15's, U'16's, U'18's and senior women.
