= Blackwood RFC =

Welsh rugby union club, based in Blackwood

(Wales) Blackwood RFC
- Full name: Blackwood Rugby Football Club
- Union: Welsh Rugby Union
- Founded: 1889; 137 years ago
- Location: Blackwood, Wales
- Ground: Glan-Yr-Afon (Capacity: 800 Seated)
- Chairman: Richard Lewis
- Coach(es): Steven Barber (Head Coach), Scott Williams (Backs), Jacob Allen (Forward-Scrum Coach), Phillip Powell (Forwards), Shane Lewis (Backs)
- Captain: Josh Law
- League: WRU Division 1 East
Team kit

Official website
- blackwood.rfc.wales

Blackwood Rugby Football Club is a Welsh rugby union team. Blackwood RFC was established in Blackwood in 1889 and in 1918 gained the status of membership of the Welsh Rugby Union. They play their home games at Glan-Yr-Afon Park.

== History and development ==
In the 1960s the club purchased an old police station and converted it for use as a clubhouse.

In 1997 a new 800-seater stand was constructed with the capital coming from match sponsorship and donations.

In 1998 Blackwood RFC purchased approximately one and a half acres of land adjacent to its playing field at Glan-Yr-Afon from British Gas. This purchase also included an on site disused gas service centre. This property was purchased with the full support of the WRU.

In 2002 the club undertook a renovation of the gas service centre. The old clubhouse in Hall Street was closed in the May 2003 with the focus of developing a new clubhouse for the start of the 2003 season. The new clubhouse opened for the start of the new season in September 2003. Blackwood also run a Youth team and a large mini section.

== Present status ==
Today, Blackwood RFC plays in the Welsh Rugby Union Division One East.

They won the 2008-2009 title Division 1 title with a win against Bargoed at Glan-Yr-Afon Park on 11 April 2009, but were unable to face Carmarthen Quins in a play-off for promotion to the Welsh Premier Division as their ground was deemed to not meet WRU standards.

== Club honours ==
- 2008/09 WRU Division One East - Champions
- 2024/25 WRU Division Two East - Champions
