= Brecon RFC =

Welsh rugby union club, based in Brecon, Powys

- Full name: Brecon Rugby Football Club
- Founded: 1874; 152 years ago
- Location: Brecon, Wales
- Ground: Parc de Pugh
- President: Andy Lewis
- Coach: Dale McIntosh
- League: Welsh Premier Division
- 2024-2025: Welsh Premier Division, 5th
Team kit

Official website
- www.breconrfc.co.uk

Brecon Rugby Football Club (Welsh: Clwb Rygbi Aberhonddu) is a rugby union club from the town of Brecon, Mid Wales. The club is a member of the Welsh Rugby Union and is a feeder club for Cardiff Rugby. Since 2024, the club has played in the Welsh Premier Division.

== Origins ==
The club was one of the eleven founding members of the Welsh Rugby Union in 1881. Brecon, along with Pontypool, Llandovery College, Lampeter College, Llandeilo and Merthyr inaugurated the South Wales Cup competition in the 1877-78 season.

The first recorded match with a Brecon rugby team first appeared on 9 November 1867 in "The Brecon County Times" where a Town team from Brecon lost 2-0 to Christ's College, Brecon on 6 November 1867.

An ad appeared on 24 October 1868, in The Brecon County Times, stating the formation of a new club in the town, playing their inaugural match on 21 October 1868 on the cricket field, with the captain's side beating the secretaries side. Their kit for the match was "white Jerseys bound with green, and a fleur-de-lis on the left side". There was no name of the new club mentioned. On 9 January 1869, another team was formed in Brecon, called "The United Rangers".

== Recent history ==
In 2004 the club became a feeder club for Cardiff Rugby.

In 2019, Brecon completed a double: they won the 2018–19 season of the WRU Division One East less than a week after winning the WRU National Plate at the Principality Stadium. In spite of their league success, the club missed out on promotion after losing a two-legged play-off against Glamorgan Wanderers. The club went on to finish runners-up in the 2023–24 Welsh Championship West behind Narberth, with the top five teams promoted to the Welsh Premier Division for the 2024–25 season.

== Club honours ==
- 2018-19 WRU Plate - Winners
