= Llantwit Fardre RFC =

(Wales) Llantwit Fardre RFC
- Full name: Llantwit Fardre Rugby Football Club
- Founded: 1899
- Location: Llantwit Fardre, Wales
- Ground: Parc Canol (Capacity: Blue and Gold)
- President: Mr John Marsh (2022 - )
- Coach: Darren Bool
- League: Men's: WRU Division Two East Central Women's: WRU Championship
- 2023/24: 9th
Team kit

Official website
- www.llantwit-rugby.co.uk

Llantwit Fardre Rugby Football Club is a rugby union team from the village of Llantwit Fardre, South Wales. The club was formed in its present state in 1946 and obtained membership of the Welsh Rugby Union in 1949. Llantwit Fardre RFC is a feeder club for the Cardiff Rugby

== Early history ==
'Parish Rugby was played as early as 1886 on the Duffryn Bach field and continued to be played there until 1908 when the team moved to Tynywaun field, Hollybush, where the game continued until the Great War. At about the same time as the senior side, a junior club came into existence. Before 1908 this team played in the field where, later, The Parade and Lewis Street were built.'

A South Wales Daily News article for December 1900 named a Llantwit Fardre team that played Ystrad Stars. Some of these players appear in photographs of the 1908 and 1911 Llantwit Fardre teams in the clubhouse, giving credence to the assumption that Llantwit Fardre RFC was in existence in the season 1900–01.

After the First World War, Llantwit Fardre Rugby Football Club was a member of the Pontypridd and Rhondda League, but little evidence exists after 1926, where it appears the team disbanded.

== History after the Second World War ==
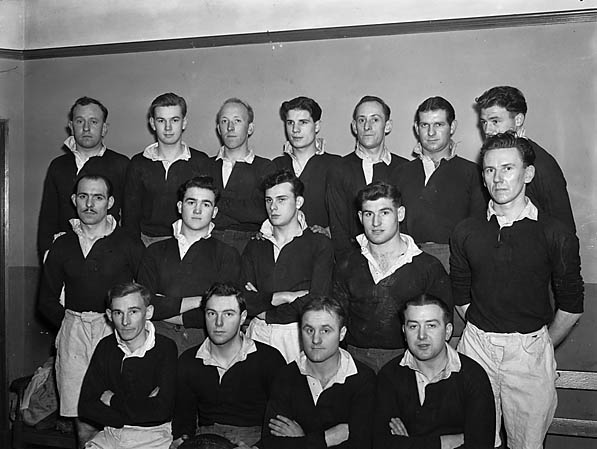
A photograph of the Llantwit Fadre team taken on 14 December 1951 by Geoff Charles

The present day club was founded in 1946 as a result of a casual meeting at the Carpenter's Arms, Efail Isaf. A public meeting was held at Bethel Baptist Church in The Parade, Church Village, on Wednesday 22 May 1946. This was later to become the site of the new clubhouse in 1961

On Saturday 19 September 1946 the Club played its first match in the Pontypridd & Rhondda League away to Rhondda Transport. The Club colours were black shirts with white collars. From 1946 to the end of the 1949 season home fixtures were played on fields at Duffryn Dowlais Farm. At the beginning of the 1949–50 season the team transferred to the Vicarage Field. Club Headquarters and changing rooms were based at the Cross Inn, Church Village, some distance from the playing fields. Within three seasons the Club achieved membership of the WRU

In 1951 the Llantrisant and Llantwit Fardre Rural District Council made a field available at Cae Fardre, Church Village. It was officially opened on 1 September 1951 with Pontypridd RFC providing the opposition.

== Club badge ==
The club badge comprises a Welsh dragon holding a bunch of five keys, symbolic of St. Illtyd, celebrated as the saint of the five keys. The five keys symbolise:- Youth, Learning, Chivalry, Priesthood and Knighthood.

== Club honours ==
- 1994-95 Welsh League Division 8A Central - Champions

== Notable former players ==
- Justin Burnell - former Cardiff RFC, Pontypridd RFC, Neath RFC and Wales A back row forward.
- Ellis Jenkins - former Cardiff Rugby and Wales flanker
- (Wales) Neil Jenkins - the first player to break the 1000 points barrier on an international level.
- Jason Lee (rugby league) - former Rugby League player who played wing for Dudley Hill, Warrington Wolves, Keighley, Halifax and Doncaster and the Wales national rugby league team during the 1990s and 2000s.
- Geraint Lewis - former Pontypridd, Rotherham, Bath, Bristol and Wales Number 8

Keith Orrell. Newport RFC & Pontypool RFC.
