= WRU League 1 East =

Rugby Union league

WRU Specsavers Division One East
- Founded: 2006
- No. of teams: 12
- Country: Wales
- Most recent champion: Newbridge RFC (2022-23)
- Level on pyramid: 3
- Promotion to: WRU Specsavers National Championship
- Relegation to: WRU Specsavers Division 2 East
- Website: community.wru.wales/club/national-leagues/national-leagues-fixtures-and-results/

The Welsh Rugby Union Specsavers Division One East is a rugby union league in Wales. It was 'born' out of a restructure of the former league system that had formally begun in Wales for the 1990/91 season. As a result of the restructure of 2006, the WRU decided to divide the then Division One into two leagues, East and West, and Division 1 East was implemented and became a regular part of the fixture list. In 2014, another restructure of Welsh Rugby's league system saw more changes within the Division One tier. This introduced an additional 2 leagues at this level bringing the total number of Division 1 leagues up to 4. Each league comprises 12 teams and combined the 48 clubs from the old Divisions One and Two with Clubs being placed into the corresponding league table based on their geographic location. The four leagues that currently make up the Division 1 level are as follows: Division One East, Division One East Central, Division One West Central and Division One West.

== Competition format and sponsorship ==
=== Competition ===
There are 12 clubs in the WRU Division 1 East. During the course of a season (which lasts from September to April) each club plays the others twice, once at their home ground and once at that of their opponents for a total of 22 games for each club, with a total of 132 games in each season. Teams receive four points for a win and two point for a draw, an additional bonus point is awarded to either team if they score four tries or more in a single match. No points are awarded for a loss though the losing team can gain a bonus point for finishing the match within seven points of the winning team. Teams are ranked by total points, then by the number of wins, then by the number of tries scored and then by their points ratio (points for divided by points against). At the end of each season, the club which finishes top (as determined by the above criteria) is crowned as champion and is presented with the league winners trophy.

=== Promotion ===
For the 2011/12 season 5 clubs were promoted to the new National Championship. Unlike past seasons, for 2011/12 the criteria for promotion was not based on the current season's results, but instead took into account the past 5 seasons results. Each club was awarded a meritocracy score depending on their league placings over the past 5 seasons and the 5 Clubs with the highest meritocracy scores were promoted.

Following this 2011/12 season, the Division 1 level was regionalised further with the WRU introducing Division 1 East, East Central, West Central and West. These 4 leagues will feed into the WRU National Championship with the winners of each East Division and each West Division competing in a 2 leg play-off match on a home and away basis. The winner of these play-off games will be determined by the aggregate score at the end of both matches. The 2 Clubs with the winning aggregate score (1 from East and 1 from West) will then be promoted to the Championship.

=== Relegation ===
For the 2011/12 season there will be no relegation. Instead the 7 clubs who are not promoted into the new National Championship via the meritocracy criteria detailed above will remain in Division One East for the 2012/13 season.

=== Sponsorship ===
In 2008 the Welsh Rugby Union announced a new sponsorship deal for the club rugby leagues with SWALEC valued at £1 million (GBP). The initial three year sponsorship was extended at the end of the 2010/11 season, making SWALEC the league sponsors until 2015. The leagues then went without a sponsor until 2019 when a new 3-year deal with Specsavers was announced which also incorporates the WRU's National Cup, Plate, Bowl and Shield competitions. The leagues sponsored are the WRU Divisions from the National Championship through to Divisions 3.

- (2002–2005) Lloyds TSB
- (2005–2008) Asda
- (2008–2015) SWALEC
- (2019–2022) Specsavers

== Winners ==
| Season | Winners | Name of league |
|---|---|---|
| 2006-07 | Beddau RFC | WRU Division One East |
| 2007-08 | Pontypool RFC | WRU Division One East |
| 2008-09 | Blackwood RFC | WRU League 1 East |
| 2009-10 | UWIC RFC | WRU League 1 East |
| 2010-11 | Ebbw Vale | WRU League 1 East |
| 2011-12 | Ebbw Vale | WRU League 1 East |
| 2012-13 | RGC 1404 | WRU League 1 East |
| 2013-14 | Merthyr RFC | WRU League 1 East |
| 2014-15 | Penallta RFC | WRU League 1 East |
| 2015-16 | Bedlinog RFC | WRU Division One East |
| 2016-17 | Rhydyfelin RFC | WRU Division One East |
| 2017-18 | Brynmawr RFC | WRU Division One East |
| 2018-19 | Brecon RFC | WRU Division One East |
