= Llanishen RFC =

Rugby team in Cardiff, Wales

(Wales) Llanishen RFC
- Full name: Llanishen Rugby Football Club
- Nickname: The Lions
- Founded: 1962
- Location: Llanishen, Wales
- Ground(s): Llanishen RFC 3G Pitch, CF14 5YL. (Capacity: 200)
- Coach(es): Liam Scott, Ross McKenzie, Kevin Macloed
- League: WRU Division One East Central
Team kit

Official website
- www.llanishenrfc.co.uk

Llanishen Rugby Football Club is a Welsh rugby union team based in Llanishen on the outskirts of Cardiff. Today, Llanishen RFC plays in the Welsh Rugby Union, Division One East Central League, having been promoted from the Division Three South East league in the 2011/12 season. Llanishen RFC is a feeder club for Cardiff Blues.

== Season 2026/27 ==
Club Captain

- Elliott Swindlehurst

2XV Captain

- Harry Sewell

== Committee ==
- Club Chairman - Mike O'Sullivan
- Club Treasurer - Peter Ghattas
- Club Secretary - Mark Francis

== Football ==
Llanishen FC
