= Abercynon RFC =

Welsh rugby union club, based in Abercynon

(Wales) Abercynon RFC
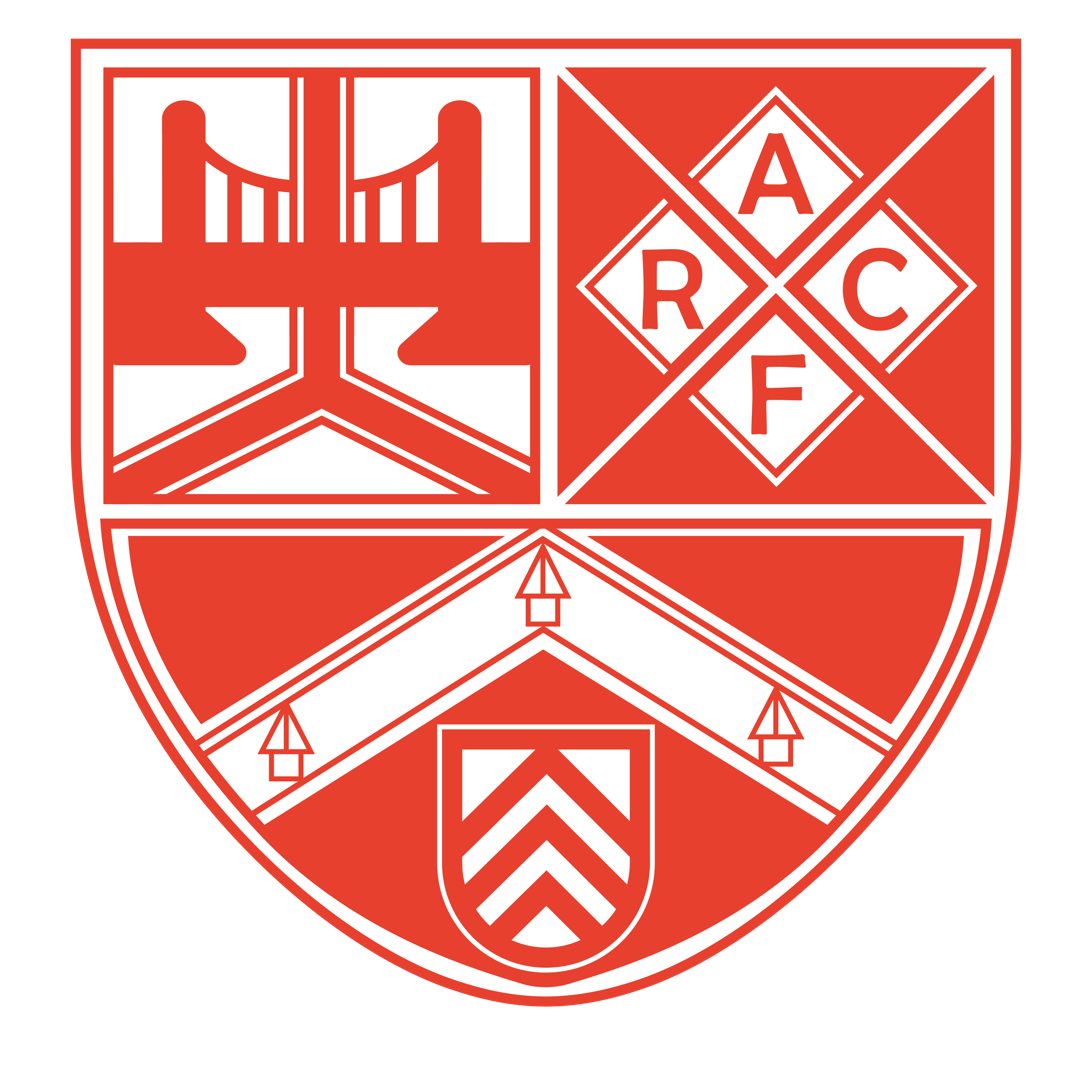
- Full name: Abercynon Rugby Football Club
- Founded: 1886; 140 years ago
- Location: Abercynon, Wales
- Ground: Y Parc
- President: Neil Edwards
- League: WRU Division One East Central
- 2023-2024: 1st currently
Team kit

Official website
- www.abercynonrfc.co.uk

Abercynon Rugby Football Club is a Welsh rugby union team based in Abercynon. Today, Abercynon RFC plays in the Welsh Rugby Union Division One East Central league and are a feeder club for Cardiff Blues.

The present club badge, designed in the early 1970s, depicts a swing bridge that used to span the river Taff to enable access to the colliery from the Carnetown area of Abercynon. Also on the club badge is the Glamorgan County coat of arms, and the coat of arms of an area bordering on Abercynon known as the Tynte.

Previous players include back to back Welsh Varsity winning legend Jack Perkins. After departing Abercynon, he spent a season with the Keys before spearheading Swansea RFC's campaign to return to the Welsh Premiership. Now back with Abercynon on dual with Merthyr.

== Club honours ==
- Glamorgan County Silver Ball Trophy 1972-73 - Winners
- Glamorgan County Silver Ball Trophy 1976-77 - Winners
- WRU Division Three South East 2010-11 - Champions

== Club staff ==
- Chairman - Neil Lewis
- Secretary - Kevin Cadogan
- Fixture Secretary - Jeff Robinson
- President - Neil Edwards
- Club Steward - Damien Withey
- 1st XV Captain - Connor Dixon
- 2nd XV Captain - Dean Page
