= Rumney RFC =

Welsh rugby union team

(Wales) Rumney RFC
- Full name: Rumney Rugby Football Club
- Location: Rumney, Wales
- Ground: Riverside Park (Capacity: 250)
- League: Admiral National Championship - East
- 2022-23: 2nd
Team kit

Official website
- www.rumneyrugbyfc.co.uk

Rumney Rugby Football Club is a Welsh rugby union based in Rumney, Wales. Rumney RFC presently compete in the Welsh Rugby Union Championship East.

Rumney were promoted to the Championship after finishing second in the Division One East league in the 2022/23 season.

== 2010/2011 Mini & Junior ==
Under 8s, 9's, 10's, 11's, 12's, 13's, 14's, 15's, 16's

== 2010/2011 Youth & Open Age ==
Rumney RFC Firsts - Admiral National Championship - East

Rumney RFC Seconds - Admiral National League 6 East Central

Rumney RFC Youth - Blues Premier

== Club honours ==
- 1994-95 Welsh League Division 5 - Champions

== Notable past players ==
- Phil Ford - Wales and Great Britain rugby league international
- Steve Ford - Wales international
- Lloyd White - Crusaders & Wales rugby league international
- Lewis Mills - South Wales Scorpions & Wales rugby league international
- Lewis Reece - South Wales Scorpions & Wales rugby league international
- Jamie Roberts - Cardiff Blues & Wales rugby union international

Gareth Delve
