= Rhiwbina RFC =

(Wales) Rhiwbina RFC
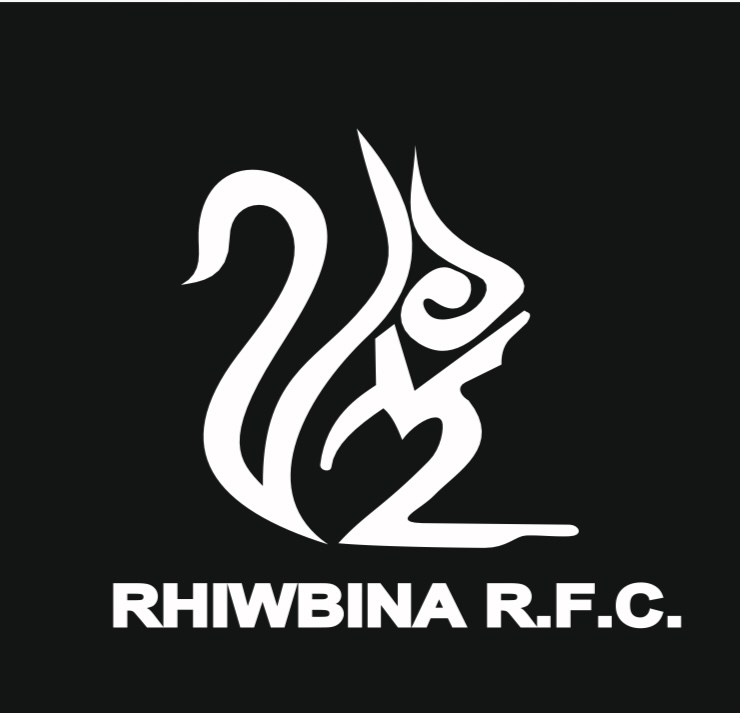
- Full name: Rhiwbina Rugby Football Club
- Nickname: The Squirrels
- Founded: 1962
- Location: Rhiwbina, Wales
- Ground: Caedelyn Park
- Chairman: Ian Hall
- President: Gwyn Williams
- Coach: Jon Bryant
- Captain: Chris Williams
- League: WRU Division One East Central
- 2014-15: 2nd
Team kit

Official website
- rhiwbina.rfc.wales

Rhiwbina Rugby Football Club is a Welsh rugby union club based in Rhiwbina, a suburb of Cardiff in Wales. Rhiwbina RFC is a member of the Welsh Rugby Union and is a feeder club for the Cardiff Blues.

Rhiwbina RFC also runs a mini and Junior Section with teams from Under 7's up to Youth.

== History ==
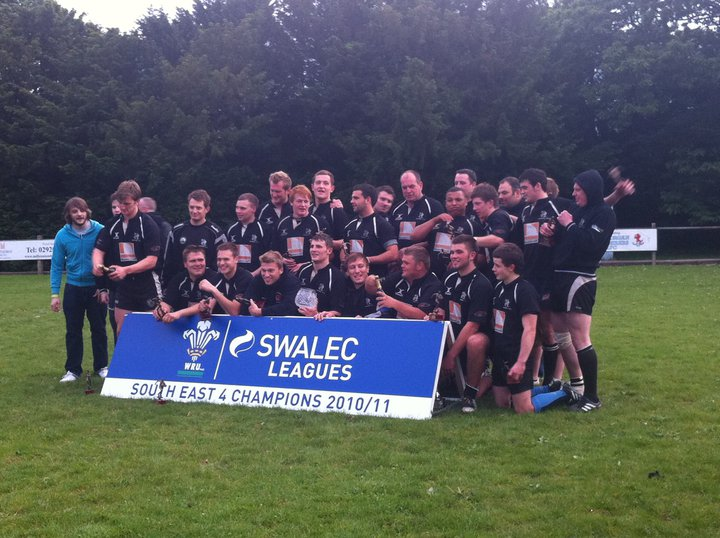
2011 League Champions

The club was established on 14 February 1962, when a notice was put up in a Post Office window in Rhiwbina by Jack Treeby. Jack invited interested people to meet and following this meeting the club was formed.

The "Squirrel" name and logo came about as a result of the newly formed club meeting in the Butchers Arms, an Ansells pub which used the squirrel motif as an emblem.

Rhiwbina Rugby was awarded full Welsh Rugby Union (WRU) status in 1975, the nominator's included Pontypridd and Penarth Rugby clubs.

Rhiwbinas previous President was Keith Rowlands, who was also the President of the WRU and who played for Wales and the British Lions.

Rhiwbina has in recent years enjoyed success on and off the field. There were wholesale change of the committee in 2008, this saw the club head in a new direction, with a new enthusiasm. The introduction of the new coaching team of Gareth Lintern and Jared Lougher saw a turn around of fortunes on the pitch. Back to back promotions in 2010/11 and 2011/12 saw the club narrowly miss out on a third promotion in 2012/13. In 2013 there was the opening of new changing rooms and floodlights by WRU CEO Roger Lewis, this proved a worthwhile addition to the club. In the following season Rhiwbina RFC won the Div 2 East title gaining promotion to Div 1. During this season there was an appearance at the Millennium Stadium in the final of the SWALEC Plate competition. The team narrowly lost to Merthyr 29-26. In the same season there was a first appearance in the Silver Ball Final. James Bird a Rhiwbina RFC product gained international honours with the USA in 2016. With two senior sides, and a youth, mini, and junior team, the future for Rhiwbina RFC looks bright.

== Notable former players ==
- (Wales) Sam Warburton
- (Wales) Gareth Delve
- (Wales) Nick Macleod
- (Wales) James Goode
- James Bird (USA)

== Club honours ==
- WRU Division Five South East 2006/07 - Champions (Perfect season P18 W18 D0 L0)
- WRU Division Four South East 2010/11 - Champions
- East District Cup 2010/11 - Winners
- WRU Division Three South East 2011/12 - Runners Up
- SWALEC WRU Division Two East 2013-2014 Champions
- SWALEC Plate 2013-2014 Runners up
- Brains Smooth Silver Ball 2013-2014 Runners up
- SWALEC Division One East 2014/15 Runners up

== See also ==
- Rugby union in Wales
- Rugby in Cardiff
