= Ynysybwl RFC =

Welsh rugby union club, based in Ynysybwl

(Wales) Ynysybwl RFC
- Full name: Ynysybwl Rugby Football Club
- Nickname: Bwl
- Founded: 1880; 146 years ago
- Location: Ynysybwl, Wales
- Ground: The Recreation Ground
- League: WRU Division One East
Team kit

Official website
- ynysybwlrfc.mywru.co.uk

Ynysybwl Rugby Football Club is a Welsh rugby union team based in Ynysybwl. Ynysybwl RFC plays in the Welsh Rugby Union, Division One East League and is a feeder club for the Cardiff Blues.

Ynysbwl RFC was established in 1880. In the years between 1945 and 1955 Ynysybwl played in the Glamorgan League and Cup with other local clubs such as Pontypridd RFC, Ebbw Vale RFC and Glamorgan Wanderers. From the 1980s the club joined the Mid District League.

== Club honours ==
- 1998/99 Glamorgan County Silver Ball Trophy - Winners
- 2005/06 Glamorgan County Silver Ball Trophy - Winners
- 2005/06 Glamorgan County President's Cup - Winners

== Notable past players ==
- (Wales) Garin Jenkins
- (Wales) Staff Jones
- (Wales) Dale McIntosh
- (Wales) Tommy Scourfield
- (Wales) Adam Thomas (rugby union)
