= Senghenydd RFC =

Welsh rugby union club, based in Senghenydd

(Wales) Senghenydd RFC
- Full name: Senghenydd Rugby Football Club
- Nickname: Saints
- Founded: 1898; 128 years ago
- Location: Senghenydd, Wales
- Ground: The Welfare Ground (Capacity: 6,000)
- Coach: Lee Jarvis
- League: WRU Division Three East
- 2025/26: 19th
| 1st kit | 2nd kit |

Senghenydd Rugby Football Club are a Welsh rugby union club based in Senghenydd in South Wales. The club formed during the 1898/99 season built around the immigrant workers coming from port areas around Wales to find employment in the newly sunk Senghenydd coal mines.

== Early history ==
1904 saw the great religious revival throughout South Wales led by the lay preacher, Evan Roberts. Rugby was seen as a wicked sport leading to violence and drunkenness, and Roberts managed to convert so many to his cause that Senghenydd RFC disbanded due to a lack of players. In 1907 a rugby team reformed under the name Senghenydd Bluebells RFC, before reverting to Senghenydd RFC.

On 14 October 1913 Britain's worst ever mining disaster occurred at Senghenydd Colliery, amongst the 439 victims were five members of Senghenydd RFC.

During the 1914/15 season Senghenydd applied for and was successful in gaining membership of the Welsh Rugby Union. This would allow them to play the larger affiliated clubs and take part in more accepted cup competitions. This new era of rugby did not occur due to the outbreak of World War I causing the cessation of competitive rugby throughout Wales.

== Post 1945 ==
One of Senghenydd RFC's most successful periods was during the late 1960s and early 1970s. By the time that the senior team won the Glamorgan County Silver Ball Trophy for the first time during the 1970/71 season they had won the Mid-District Championship four times in the previous five seasons. They made that five in six in 1970/71 when they finished the table with a perfect 20 wins out of 20 matches. The only major trophy the team failed to win in the 1970/71 season was the Mid District Cup, beaten by Beddau 17–11 in the final.

== Club honours ==
- 1911/12 Cardiff and District League Championship, 2nd Division – Champions
- 1911/12 Lord Ninian Stuart Cup – Champions
- 1923/24 Lord Ninian Stuart Cup – Champions
- 1924/25 Lord Ninian Stuart Cup – Champions
- 1949/50 Ivor Williams Cup – Champions
- 1970/71 Mid-District Championship – Champions
- 1970/71 Glamorgan County Silver Ball Trophy – Winners
- 1971/72 Glamorgan County Silver Ball Trophy – Winners
- 1976/77 Ivor Williams Cup – Champions
- 2010/11 Swalec Bowl

== Bibliography ==
- Boulton, William G. (1982). Senghenydd : the village and its rugby club. Starling.
- Owen, Arwyn (1972). Rugby Annual for Wales 1971-72. Welsh Brewers Ltd.
- Smith, David; Williams, Gareth (1980). Fields of Praise: The Official History of The Welsh Rugby Union. Cardiff: University of Wales Press. ISBN 0-7083-0766-3.
