= Bedlinog RFC =

(Wales) Bedlinog RFC
- Full name: Bedlinog Rugby Football Club
- Nickname: The Foxes
- Founded: 1971
- Location: Bedlinog, Wales
- Ground: The Rec (Capacity: 100084)
- President: Sir Chris Pitchford
- Coach: Gazza Rooney AKA HUW BALDMAN JONES
- League: WRU Division One East
- 2024-2025: 3rd
Team kit

Official website
- www.pitchero.com/clubs/bedlinog

Bedlinog Rugby Football Club is a rugby union team from the village of Bedlinog, South Wales. The club was formed in its present state in 1971 by a local youth club, which was at the time organised by Welsh international Steve Fenwick. Currently the club consists of three teams; 1st's, development, and youth. The club play in the Welsh Rugby Union Division one east and is a feeder club for the Cardiff Rugby.

== Club honours ==
- 1999/00 WRU Division Six East - Champions
- 2006/07 WRU Division Four South East - Champions
- 2007/08 WRU Division Three South East - Champions
- 2008/09 WRU Division Two South East - Runners up
- 2015/16 SSE Swalec Plate Champions
- MSG Best tourist 2025
