= Rhydyfelin RFC =

Welsh rugby union club, based in Rhydyfelin

(Wales) Rhydyfelin RFC
- Full name: Rhydyfelin Rugby Football Club
- Nickname: 'The Village'
- Founded: 1905; 121 years ago
- Location: Rhydyfelin, Wales
- Ground: The Rec (Capacity: 1000)
- President: Tommy David
- Coach(es): Gareth Studley, Keiron Phillips
- League: WRU Championship
- 2016/17: 1st
Team kit

Official website
- www.rhydyfelin.rfc.wales

Rhydyfelin Rugby Football Club is a Welsh rugby union team based in Rhydyfelin. Rhydyfelin RFC is a member of the Welsh Rugby Union, Rhondda & East Glamorgan district, Mid District C and is a feeder club for the Cardiff Blues.

== Club badge ==
The present club badge is based on a shield design split into quarters. The four sections of the badge represent the Glamorgan Chevrons, the former round houses of Rhydyfelin, the old tin works of Rhydyfelin and the old viaduct that once ran through the village.

== Honours ==
1st Team: MDRU Cup Finalists 2017/18

WRU Division 1 East Champions 2016/17

Championship Playoff Winners 2016/17

Glamorgan County Silver Ball Winners 2016/17

Swalec Plate Finalists 2012/13

Welsh Division 3 South East Champions 2005 (Unbeaten 26/26)

Welsh Division 4 Champions 2003

Welsh Division 5 Champions 2001

2nd Team:

Keith Jones Cup Winners 2022/23

Rhondda & East Glamorgan Championship Winners 2018/19

Rhondda & East Glamorgan Division 2 Winners 2017/18

Mel Davies Cup Winners 2017/18

Rhondda & East Glamorgan Division 3 Winners 2016/17

Mel Davies Cup Winners 2016/17

Rhondda & East Glamorgan Division C Winners 2015/16

Mel Davies Cup Winners 2015/16

Rhondda & East Glamorgan Division D Winners 2013/14

Ivor Williams Cup Winners 2013/14

Rhondda & East Glamorgan Premier 2a Champions 2008/09

Ivor Williams Cup Winners 2008/09 (Tenth time)

Youth:

Cardiff Rugby Youth Cup competitions North Bowl winners 2021

WRU Youth Plate Finalists 2015/16

Blues Youth Division BB Champions 2007

Taff Rhondda Cup Winners 2007
