= 2006–07 Welsh Premier Division =

The 2006–07 Welsh Premier Division or 2006–07 Principality Premiership for sponsorship reasons was the sixteenth Welsh Premier Division. The season began on Saturday 2 September 2006 and ended on Saturday 5 May 2007. Fourteen teams played each other on a home and away basis. This was also the last season where teams earned three points for a win and one point for a draw.

== Stadiums ==
2006–07 Welsh Premier Division clubs

| Team | Stadium | Capacity | City/Area |
|---|---|---|---|
| Aberavon RFC | Talbot Athletic Ground | 5,000* | Port Talbot, Neath Port Talbot |
| Bedwas RFC | Bridge Field | 2,000 | Bedwas, Caerphilly |
| Bridgend RFC | Brewery Field | 12,000 | Bridgend |
| Cardiff RFC | Cardiff Arms Park | 14,000 | Cardiff |
| Cross Keys RFC | Pandy Park | 3,000 | Crosskeys, Caerphilly |
| Ebbw Vale RFC | Eugene Cross Park | 8,000 | Ebbw Vale, Blaenau Gwent |
| Glamorgan Wanderers RFC | The Memorial Ground | 3,000 | Ely, Cardiff |
| Llandovery RFC | Church Bank Playing Fields | 5,000 | Llandovery, Carmarthenshire |
| Llanelli RFC | Stradey Park | 10,800 | Llanelli, Carmarthenshire |
| Maesteg RFC | Llynfi Road | N/A | Maesteg, Bridgend |
| Neath RFC | The Gnoll | 5,000 | Neath, Neath Port Talbot |
| Newport RFC | Rodney Parade | 11,700 | Newport |
| Pontypridd RFC | Sardis Road | 7,861 | Pontypridd, Rhondda Cynon Taf |
| Swansea RFC | St. Helen's Ground | 4,500 | Swansea |

- 1,500 of them are seats

== Table ==
| POS | TEAM | PL | W | D | L | PF | PA | DIFF | TF | TA | PTS | STATUS |
|---|---|---|---|---|---|---|---|---|---|---|---|---|
| 1 | Neath | 26 | 17 | 2 | 7 | 704 | 473 | 231 | 80 | 51 | 53 | Welsh Premier Division Champions and remained in the Welsh Premier Division for the 2007-08 season |
| 2 | Ebbw Vale | 26 | 16 | 3 | 7 | 557 | 503 | 54 | 63 | 47 | 51 | Remained in the Welsh Premier Division for the 2007-08 season |
| 3 | Newport | 26 | 16 | 2 | 8 | 619 | 480 | 139 | 70 | 49 | 50 | Remained in the Welsh Premier Division for the 2007-08 season |
| 4 | Pontypridd | 26 | 16 | 1 | 9 | 543 | 504 | 39 | 63 | 58 | 49 | Remained in the Welsh Premier Division for the 2007-08 season |
| 5 | Llanelli | 26 | 12 | 2 | 12 | 629 | 509 | 120 | 83 | 55 | 38 | Remained in the Welsh Premier Division for the 2007-08 season |
| 6 | The Wanderers | 26 | 12 | 2 | 12 | 577 | 602 | -25 | 71 | 68 | 38 | Remained in the Welsh Premier Division for the 2007-08 season |
| 7 | Aberavon | 26 | 12 | 2 | 12 | 603 | 615 | -12 | 66 | 74 | 38 | Remained in the Welsh Premier Division for the 2007-08 season |
| 8 | Cardiff Rugby | 26 | 12 | 1 | 13 | 601 | 580 | 21 | 64 | 66 | 37 | Remained in the Welsh Premier Division for the 2007-08 season |
| 9 | Swansea | 26 | 12 | 0 | 14 | 487 | 609 | -122 | 53 | 69 | 36 | Remained in the Welsh Premier Division for the 2007-08 season |
| 10 | Bedwas | 26 | 11 | 1 | 14 | 446 | 524 | -78 | 41 | 57 | 34 | Remained in the Welsh Premier Division for the 2007-08 season |
| 11 | Bridgend | 26 | 11 | 0 | 15 | 459 | 508 | -49 | 49 | 54 | 33 | Remained in the Welsh Premier Division for the 2007-08 season |
| 12 | Maesteg | 26 | 10 | 0 | 16 | 531 | 596 | -65 | 51 | 65 | 30 | Remained in the Welsh Premier Division for the 2007-08 season |
| 13 | Cross Keys | 26 | 9 | 2 | 15 | 485 | 528 | -43 | 62 | 59 | 29 | Remained in the Welsh Premier Division for the 2007-08 season |
| 14 | Llandovery | 26 | 7 | 0 | 19 | 482 | 692 | -210 | 43 | 87 | 21 | Originally relegated for the 2007-08 season but were reprieved after Beddau were denied promotion |

== Results ==
=== Matchday 1 ===
Saturday 2 September 2006, 2:30pm
| Bedwas | 18 - 3 | Cross Keys |
| Bridgend | 7 - 16 | Ebbw Vale |
| Cardiff Rugby | 30 - 36 | Swansea |
| Llanelli | 17 - 16 | Maesteg |
| Newport | 16 - 19 | Aberavon |
| Pontypridd | 13 - 33 | Llandovery |
| The Wanderers | 33 - 30 | Neath |

=== Matchday 2 ===
Saturday 9 September 2006, 2:30pm
| Bridgend | 35 - 13 | Cross Keys |
| Cardiff Rugby | 36 - 24 | Llanelli |
| Ebbw Vale | 7 - 12 | Newport |
| Llandovery | 13 - 32 | Aberavon |
| Maesteg | 29 - 15 | Bedwas |
| Neath | 57 - 17 | Pontypridd |
| Swansea | 33 - 29 | The Wanderers |

=== Matchday 3 ===
Saturday 16 September 2006, 2:30pm
| Aberavon | 12 - 33 | Pontypridd |
| Bedwas | 33 - 25 | Swansea |
| Cardiff Rugby | 24 - 21 | Bridgend |
| Cross Keys | 43 - 17 | Llandovery |
| Ebbw Vale | 23 - 23 | Neath |
| Llanelli | 18 - 25 | The Wanderers |
| Newport | 37 - 18 | Maesteg |

=== Matchday 4 ===
Saturday 23 September 2006, 2:30pm
| Aberavon | 30 - 21 | Cardiff Rugby |
| Llandovery | 28 - 12 | Bedwas |
| Maesteg | 37 - 23 | Ebbw Vale |
| Neath | 24 - 22 | Llanelli |
| Newport | 29 - 11 | Bridgend |
| Pontypridd | 40 - 15 | Swansea |
| The Wanderers | 25 - 32 | Cross Keys |

=== Matchday 5 ===
Saturday 30 September 2006, 2:30pm
| Aberavon | 19 - 18 | Maesteg |
| Bedwas | 9 - 27 | Newport |
| Bridgend | 37 - 12 | The Wanderers |
| Cross Keys | 11 - 15 | Ebbw Vale |
| Llandovery | 21 - 6 | Llanelli |
| Pontypridd | 20 - 18 | Cardiff Rugby |
| Swansea | 19 - 42 | Neath |

=== Matchday 6 ===
Saturday 7 October 2006, 2:30pm
| Cross Keys | 39 - 6 | Pontypridd |
| Ebbw Vale | 27 - 25 | Aberavon |
| Llandovery | 14 - 23 | Cardiff Rugby |
| Llanelli | 64 - 22 | Bridgend |
| Neath | 34 - 13 | Maesteg |
| Swansea | 33 - 13 | Newport |
| The Wanderers | 13 - 19 | Bedwas |

=== Matchday 7 ===
Saturday 14 October 2006, 2:30pm
| Bridgend | 18 - 13 | Neath |
| Cardiff Rugby | 44 - 26 | Cross Keys |
| Ebbw Vale | 24 - 13 | Swansea |
| Llanelli | 24 - 22 | Aberavon |
| Maesteg | 23 - 11 | The Wanderers |
| Newport | 68 - 15 | Llandovery |
| Pontypridd | 24 - 10 | Bedwas |

=== Matchday 8 ===
Saturday 21 October 2006, 2:30pm
| Aberavon | 23 - 22 | Bridgend |
| Bedwas | 16 - 19 | Ebbw Vale |
| Cardiff Rugby | 26 - 11 | The Wanderers |
| Cross Keys | 18 - 18 | Llanelli |
| Llandovery | 13 - 27 | Neath |
| Pontypridd | 14 - 22 | Newport |
| Swansea | 6 - 16 | Maesteg |

=== Matchday 9 ===
Saturday 28 October 2006, 2:30pm
| Bridgend | 25 - 0 | Swansea |
| Ebbw Vale | 23 - 13 | Pontypridd |
| Llanelli | 28 - 19 | Bedwas |
| Maesteg | 22 - 12 | Llandovery |
| Neath | 6 - 10 | Cross Keys |
| Newport | 18 - 18 | Cardiff Rugby |
| The Wanderers | 20 - 20 | Aberavon |

=== Matchday 10 (6/7) ===
Wednesday 8 November 2006, 7:15pm
| The Wanderers | 11 - 23 | Newport |
Friday 10 November 2006, 7:00pm
| Aberavon | 33 - 12 | Swansea |
| Bedwas | 20 - 18 | Neath |
| Cardiff Rugby | 19 - 21 | Ebbw Vale |
| Llandovery | 28 - 29 | Bridgend |
| Llanelli | 37 - 7 | Pontypridd |

=== Matchday 11 (6/7) ===
Saturday 18 November 2006, 2:30pm
| Bedwas | 15 - 11 | Bridgend |
| Ebbw Vale | 39 - 22 | The Wanderers |
| Llanelli | 27 - 13 | Newport |
| Neath | 27 - 19 | Cardiff Rugby |
| Pontypridd | 32 - 17 | Maesteg |
| Swansea | 15 - 10 | Llandovery |

=== Matchday 12 ===
Saturday 2 December 2006, 2:30pm
| Aberavon | 21 - 12 | Bedwas |
| Bridgend | 7 - 9 | Pontypridd |
| Cross Keys | 15 - 11 | Swansea |
| Llanelli | 17 - 13 | Ebbw Vale |
| Maesteg | 19 - 31 | Cardiff Rugby |
| Newport | 25 - 21 | Neath |
| The Wanderers | 57 - 35 | Llandovery |

=== Matchday 13 ===
Saturday 9 December 2006, 2:30pm
| Bridgend | 14 - 5 | Cardiff Rugby |
| Llandovery | 22 - 16 | Cross Keys |
| Maesteg | 18 - 40 | Newport |
| Neath | 23 - 23 | Ebbw Vale |
| Pontypridd | 37 - 8 | Aberavon |
| Swansea | 17 - 3 | Bedwas |
| The Wanderers | 13 - 22 | Llanelli |

=== Matchday 14 ===
Saturday 16 December 2006, 2:30pm
| Bedwas | 13 - 9 | Llandovery |
| Bridgend | 27 - 18 | Newport |
| Cardiff Rugby | 28 - 23 | Aberavon |
| Cross Keys | 23 - 24 | The Wanderers |
| Ebbw Vale | 18 - 15 | Maesteg |
| Llanelli | 31 - 11 | Neath |
| Swansea | 10 - 14 | Pontypridd |

=== Matchday 15 ===
Saturday 23 December 2006, 2:30pm
| Swansea | 3 - 37 | Llanelli |
Tuesday 26 December 2006
1:00pm
| Bedwas | 12 - 20 | Cardiff Rugby |
2:30pm
| Aberavon | 22 - 24 | Neath |
| Bridgend | 20 - 15 | Maesteg |
| Cross Keys | 13 - 13 | Newport |
| Llandovery | 9 - 13 | Ebbw Vale |
| Pontypridd | 29 - 6 | The Wanderers |

=== Matchday 16 (5/7) ===
Saturday 30 December 2006
2:30pm
| Ebbw Vale | 21 - 3 | Cross Keys |
| Neath | 29 - 5 | Swansea |
| Newport | 39 - 11 | Bedwas |
| The Wanderers | 15 - 3 | Bridgend |
5:30pm
| Cardiff Rugby | 6 - 13 | Pontypridd |

=== Matchday 17 (5/7) ===
Saturday 6 January 2007, 2:30pm
| Ebbw Vale | 37 - 23 | Bridgend |
| Llandovery | 19 - 27 | Pontypridd |
| Maesteg | 33 - 21 | Llanelli |
| Neath | 36 - 20 | The Wanderers |
| Swansea | 23 - 22 | Cardiff Rugby |

=== Matchday 18 ===
Saturday 13 January 2007, 2:30pm
| Aberavon | 39 - 19 | Ebbw Vale |
| Bedwas | 10 - 11 | The Wanderers |
| Bridgend | 14 - 8 | Llanelli |
| Cardiff Rugby | 42 - 21 | Llandovery |
| Maesteg | 9 - 18 | Neath |
| Newport | 22 - 10 | Swansea |
| Pontypridd | 22 - 12 | Cross Keys |

=== Matchday 19 ===
Saturday 20 January 2007, 2:30pm
| Aberavon | 34 - 34 | Llanelli |
| Bedwas | 27 - 27 | Pontypridd |
| Cross Keys | 12 - 8 | Cardiff Rugby |
| Llandovery | 25 - 13 | Newport |
| Neath | 27 - 17 | Bridgend |
| Swansea | 18 - 23 | Ebbw Vale |
| The Wanderers | 21 - 10 | Maesteg |

=== Matchday 20 (6/7) ===
Saturday 3 February 2007, 2:30pm
| Bridgend | 16 - 24 | Aberavon |
| Ebbw Vale | 25 - 19 | Bedwas |
| Llanelli | 24 - 27 | Cross Keys |
| Maesteg | 11 - 14 | Swansea |
| Neath | 48 - 13 | Llandovery |
| The Wanderers | 31 - 34 | Cardiff Rugby |

=== Matchday 11 (7/7) ===
Saturday 24 February 2007, 2:00pm
| Cross Keys | 16 - 10 | Aberavon |

=== Matchday 21 (6/7) ===
Saturday 3 March 2007, 2:30pm
| Aberavon | 9 - 35 | The Wanderers |
| Bedwas | 21 - 16 | Llanelli |
| Cardiff Rugby | 19 - 29 | Newport |
| Llandovery | 31 - 17 | Maesteg |
| Pontypridd | 31 - 22 | Ebbw Vale |
| Swansea | 20 - 6 | Bridgend |

=== Mixed matchdays ===
Friday 9 March 2007, 7:15pm
| Cross Keys | 7 - 10 | Bedwas (M 17 - 6/7) |
| Newport | 17 - 34 | The Wanderers (M 22 - 1/7) |

=== Matchday 22 (7/7) ===
Wednesday 14 March 2007, 7:00pm
| Ebbw Vale | 22 - 27 | Cardiff Rugby |
Friday 16 March 2007, 7:00pm
| Bridgend | 8 - 14 | Llandovery |
| Maesteg | 25 - 13 | Cross Keys |
| Neath | 34 - 14 | Bedwas |
| Pontypridd | 17 - 11 | Llanelli |
| Swansea | 26 - 20 | Aberavon |

=== Mixed matchdays ===
Saturday 24 March 2007, 2:30pm
| Cross Keys | 13 - 22 | Neath (M 21 - 7/7) |
| Newport | 22 - 11 | Ebbw Vale (M 23 - 1/7) |

=== Matchday 24 ===
Saturday 31 March 2007, 2:30pm
| Aberavon | 29 - 27 | Cross Keys |
| Bridgend | 16 - 10 | Bedwas |
| Cardiff Rugby | 25 - 21 | Neath |
| Llandovery | 16 - 19 | Swansea |
| Maesteg | 21 - 16 | Pontypridd |
| The Wanderers | 26 - 26 | Ebbw Vale |
Sunday 1 April 2007, 2:30pm
| Newport | 18 - 13 | Llanelli |

=== Matchday 25 ===
Saturday 7 April 2007, 2:30pm
| Cardiff Rugby | 30 - 32 | Bedwas |
| Ebbw Vale | 28 - 21 | Llandovery |
| Llanelli | 23 - 36 | Swansea |
| Maesteg | 26 - 16 | Bridgend |
| Newport | 20 - 17 | Cross Keys |
| The Wanderers | 10 - 8 | Pontypridd |
Sunday 8 April 2007, 2:30pm
| Neath | 39 - 19 | Aberavon |

=== Matchday 26 (3/7) ===
Saturday 14 April 2007, 2:30pm
| Bedwas | 20 - 7 | Aberavon |
| Neath | 30 - 12 | Newport |
| Swansea | 41 - 29 | Cross Keys |

=== Mixed matchdays ===
Wednesday 18 April 2007, 7:15pm
| Cardiff Rugby | 16 - 23 | Maesteg (M 26 - 4/7) |
| The Wanderers | 44 - 27 | Swansea (M 23 - 2/7) |

=== Matchday 16 (6/7) ===
Friday 20 April 2007, 7:15pm
| Llanelli | 38 - 17 | Llandovery |

=== Mixed matchdays ===
Saturday 21 April 2007
2:30pm
| Aberavon | 21 - 28 | Newport (M 17 - 7/7) |
| Cross Keys | 32 - 25 | Maesteg (M 11 - 7/7) |
5:30pm
| Pontypridd | 18 - 20 | Neath (M 23 - 3/7) |

=== Matchday 23 (4/7) ===
Wednesday 25 April 2007, 7:15pm
| Bedwas | 46 - 20 | Maesteg |

=== Mixed matchdays ===
Saturday 28 April 2007, 2:30pm
| Cross Keys | 15 - 17 | Bridgend (M 23 - 5/7) |
| Ebbw Vale | 19 - 12 | Llanelli (M 26 - 5/7) |
| Maesteg | 35 - 37 | Aberavon (M 16 - 7/7) |
| Newport | 25 - 28 | Pontypridd (M 20 - 7/7) |

=== Matchday 23 (7/7) ===
Wednesday 2 May 2007, 7:15pm
| Aberavon | 45 - 13 | Llandovery |
| Llanelli | 37 - 10 | Cardiff Rugby |

=== Matchday 26 (7/7) ===
Saturday 5 May 2007, 2:30pm
| Llandovery | 13 - 18 | The Wanderers |
| Pontypridd | 28 - 17 | Bridgend |
