= 2009–10 Principality Premiership =

Principality Premiership
- Countries: Wales
- Number of teams: 14
- Champions: Neath RFC (League and Playoffs)
- Promoted: Tonmawr RFC (promoted from WRU Division One West)
- Relegated: Ebbw Vale RFC (relegated to WRU Division One East/WRU Division One West)

Official website
- www.wru.co.uk/985_12428.php

The 2009–10 Principality Premiership was the fifteenth Principality Premiership season and the sixth under its current format. The season began in August 2009 and ended in May 2010. Fourteen teams played each other on a home and away basis, with teams earning four points for a win, and a bonus point for scoring four or more tries in a match. The losing team may also earn a bonus point if they lose by seven points or less.

== British and Irish Cup qualification and play-off news ==
The top six clubs from the 2008-09 season qualified for the new British and Irish Cup competition. A play-off system was added at the end of the season for the top eight sides to qualify for the following season's British and Irish Cup. Only six teams can qualify for this from the eight. These play-offs do not decide the League Championship, as the league leaders at the end of the regular 26 game season will be Champions. The winners of the play-offs would win a one-off trophy.

The fourteen teams competing consisted of Aberavon RFC, Bedwas RFC, Cardiff RFC, Carmarthen Quins, Cross Keys RFC, Ebbw Vale RFC, Glamorgan Wanderers RFC, Llandovery RFC, Llanelli RFC, Neath RFC, Newport RFC, Pontypool RFC, Pontypridd RFC, Swansea RFC.

== Teams ==
Locations of Premier League teams (09/10) with colour marker showing which region they belong to

== Stadiums ==
Team	Stadium	Capacity	City/Area
Aberavon RFC	Talbot Athletic Ground	3,000	Port Talbot, Neath Port Talbot
Bedwas	The Bridge Field	3,000	Bedwas, Caerphilly
Cardiff RFC	The Arms Park	12,500	Cardiff
Carmarthen Quins	Carmarthen Park	3,000	Carmarthen, Carmarthenshire
Cross Keys RFC	Pandy Park	3,000	Crosskeys, Caerphilly
Ebbw Vale RFC	Eugene Cross Park	8,000	Ebbw Vale, Blaenau Gwent
Glamorgan Wanderers RFC	The Memorial Ground	3,000	Ely, Cardiff
Llandovery RFC	Church Bank Playing Fields	5,000	Llandovery, Carmarthenshire
Llanelli RFC	Parc y Scarlets	14,870	Llanelli, Carmarthenshire
Neath RFC	The Gnoll	7,500	Neath, Neath Port Talbot
Newport RFC	Rodney Parade	10,500	Newport
Pontypool RFC	Pontypool Park	8,800	Pontypool, Torfaen
Pontypridd RFC	Sardis Road	7,861	Pontypridd, Rhondda Cynon Taf
Swansea RFC	St Helens	4,500	Swansea

== Table ==
KEY
Champions
Qualified for play-offs
Relegated

	Team	Pld	W	D	L	PF	PA	PD	TF	TA	Try bonus	Losing bonus	Points
1	Neath RFC	26	21	0	5	927	532	395	125	53	18	2	104
2	Swansea RFC	26	19	1	6	780	527	253	101	60	15	3	96
3	Newport RFC	26	18	0	8	685	470	215	81	47	9	5	86
4	Pontypridd RFC	26	16	1	9	682	521	161	82	58	11	4	81
5	Aberavon RFC	26	14	4	8	709	617	92	82	70	10	3	77
6	Llanelli RFC	26	14	2	10	663	565	98	76	64	11	6	77
7	Cardiff RFC	26	15	2	9	612	473	120	66	46	7	4	75
8	Llandovery RFC	26	12	1	13	636	621	15	71	68	6	4	60
9	Carmarthen Quins RFC	26	11	0	15	515	562	−47	52	61	3	5	52
10	Cross Keys RFC	26	9	1	16	502	550	−48	49	49	2	7	47
11	Bedwas RFC	26	8	0	18	516	792	−276	53	100	5	7	44
12	Glamorgan Wanderers RFC	26	7	0	19	461	657	−196	47	88	2	10	40
13	Pontypool RFC	26	7	0	19	464	891	−427	52	113	5	3	36
14	Ebbw Vale RFC	26	5	0	21	312	687	−375	23	82	1	7	28
Correct as of 2010-04-21

== Fixtures & results ==
=== Week 1 ===
Date	Time	Home team	Score	Away team	Venue
August 29	14:30	Bedwas RFC	15 – 34	Neath RFC (1 BP)	The Bridge Field
August 29	14:30	Cardiff RFC (1 BP)	29 – 35	Swansea RFC (1 BP)	The Arms Park
August 29	14:30	Glamorgan Wanderers	27 – 23	Ebbw Vale RFC (1 BP)	The Memorial Ground
August 29	14:30	Llanelli RFC (1 BP)	47 – 16	Cross Keys RFC	Parc y Scarlets
August 29	14:30	Newport RFC (1 BP)	36 – 6	Carmarthen Quins	Rodney Parade
August 29	14:30	Pontypool RFC	25 – 38	Aberavon RFC (1 BP)	Pontypool Park
August 29	14:30	Pontypridd RFC (1 BP)	36 – 21	Llandovery RFC	Sardis Road

=== Week 2 ===
Date	Time	Home team	Score	Away team	Venue
September 5	14:30	Aberavon RFC (1 BP)	31 – 22	Glamorgan Wanderers	Talbot Athletic Ground
September 5	14:30	Bedwas RFC	30 – 23	Llanelli RFC (1 BP)	The Bridge Field
September 5	14:30	Carmarthen Quins	17 – 13	Pontypridd RFC (1 BP)	Carmarthen Park
September 5	14:30	Cross Keys RFC	30 – 23	Pontypool RFC (1 BP)	Pandy Park
September 5	14:30	Ebbw Vale RFC	3 – 30	Cardiff RFC	Eugene Cross Park
September 5	14:30	Llandovery RFC	19 – 35	Neath RFC	Church Bank Playing Fields
September 5	14:30	Swansea RFC (1 BP)	38 – 6	Newport RFC	St Helens

=== Week 3 ===
Date	Time	Home team	Score	Away team	Venue
September 12	14:30	Bedwas RFC	26 – 58	Swansea RFC (1 BP)	The Bridge Field
September 12	14:30	Carmarthen Quins (1 BP)	22 – 25	Neath RFC	Carmarthen Park
September 12	14:30	Cross Keys RFC	27 – 35	Aberavon RFC	Pandy Park
September 12	14:30	Glamorgan Wanderers (1 BP)	15 – 20	Cardiff RFC	The Memorial Ground
September 12	14:30	Llanelli RFC	12 – 10	Llandovery RFC (1 BP)	Parc y Scarlets
September 12	14:30	Newport RFC	22 – 13	Ebbw Vale RFC	Rodney Parade
September 12	14:30	Pontypool RFC	15 – 48	Pontypridd RFC (1 BP)	Pontypool Park

=== Week 4 ===
Date	Time	Home team	Score	Away team	Venue
September 18	19:15	Ebbw Vale RFC	3 – 28	Pontypridd RFC (1 BP)	Eugene Cross Park
September 18	19:15	Glamorgan Wanderers	25 – 19	Newport RFC (1 BP)	The Memorial Ground
September 19	14:30	Aberavon RFC (1 BP)	44 – 18	Bedwas RFC	Talbot Athletic Ground
September 19	14:30	Cardiff RFC	32 – 32	Cross Keys RFC	The Arms Park
September 19	14:30	Llandovery RFC	24 – 23	Carmarthen Quins (1 BP)	Church Bank Playing Fields
September 19	14:30	Pontypool RFC	17 – 39	Neath RFC (1 BP)	Pontypool Park
September 19	14:30	Swansea RFC (1 BP)	53 – 19	Llanelli RFC	St Helens
September 22	14:30	Cardiff RFC	22 – 20	Neath RFC (1 BP)	The Arms Park
September 22	14:30	Llanelli RFC (1 BP)	30 – 12	Aberavon RFC	Parc y Scarlets
September 22	14:30	Newport RFC	13 – 6	Pontypridd RFC (1 BP)	Rodney Parade

=== Week 5 ===
Date	Time	Home team	Score	Away team	Venue
September 26	14:30	Cardiff RFC (1 BP)	20 – 25	Llandovery RFC	The Arms Park
September 26	14:30	Carmarthen Quins (1 BP)	33 – 37	Glamorgan Wanderers (1 BP)	Carmarthen Park
September 26	14:30	Llanelli RFC (1 BP)	37 – 11	Pontypool RFC	Parc y Scarlets
September 26	14:30	Neath RFC (1 BP)	41 – 7	Ebbw Vale RFC	The Gnoll
September 26	14:30	Newport RFC (1 BP)	46 – 15	Bedwas RFC	Rodney Parade
September 26	14:30	Pontypridd RFC (1 BP)	37 – 19	Cross Keys RFC	Sardis Road
September 26	14:30	Swansea RFC	36 – 36	Aberavon RFC	St Helens

=== Week 6 ===
Date	Time	Home team	Score	Away team	Venue
October 3	14:30	Bedwas RFC (1 BP)	13 – 20	Pontypridd RFC	The Bridge Field
October 3	14:30	Carmarthen Quins	26 – 11	Aberavon RFC	Carmarthen Park
October 3	14:30	Cross Keys RFC	20 – 8	Newport RFC	Pandy Park
October 3	14:30	Ebbw Vale RFC	25 – 19	Llanelli RFC (1 BP)	Eugene Cross Park
October 3	14:30	Glamorgan Wanderers	33 – 24	Neath RFC (1 BP)	The Memorial Ground
October 3	14:30	Llandovery RFC	28 – 41	Swansea RFC (1 BP)	Church Bank Playing Fields
October 3	14:30	Pontypool RFC	10 – 38	Cardiff RFC (1 BP)	Pontypool Park

=== Week 7 ===
Date	Time	Home team	Score	Away team	Venue
October 10	14:30	Aberavon RFC	46 – 7	Ebbw Vale RFC	Talbot Athletic Ground
October 10	14:30	Bedwas RFC	35 – 31	Pontypool RFC (2 BP)	The Bridge Field
October 10	14:30	Cardiff RFC	27 – 16	Carmarthen Quins	The Arms Park
October 10	14:30	Llanelli RFC (1 BP)	35 – 28	Glamorgan Wanderers (1 BP)	Parc Y Scarlets
October 10	14:30	Neath RFC	24 – 13	Cross Keys RFC	The Gnoll
October 10	14:30	Newport RFC	27 – 18	Llandovery RFC	Rodney Parade
October 10	18:30	Pontypridd RFC	24 – 11	Swansea RFC	Sardis Road

=== Week 8 ===
Date	Time	Home team	Score	Away team	Venue
October 17	14:30	Cardiff RFC (1 BP)	29 – 22	Bedwas RFC (1 BP)	The Arms Park
October 17	14:30	Ebbw Vale RFC	12 – 36	Cross Keys RFC	Eugene Cross Park
October 17	14:30	Glamorgan Wanderers (1 BP)	12 – 18	Pontypridd RFC	The Memorial Ground
October 17	14:30	Llandovery RFC (1 BP)	52 – 34	Aberavon RFC (1 BP)	Church Bank Playing Fields
October 17	14:30	Newport RFC (1 BP)	53 – 14	Pontypool RFC	Rodney Parade
October 17	14:30	Swansea RFC (1 BP)	27 – 31	Neath RFC (1 BP)	St Helens
October 17	18:30	Carmarthen Quins	10 – 18	Llanelli RFC	Carmarthen Park

=== Week 9 ===
Date	Time	Home team	Score	Away team	Venue
October 24	14:30	Aberavon RFC (1 BP)	32 – 32	Llanelli RFC (1 BP)	Talbot Athletic Ground
October 24	14:30	Bedwas RFC	21 – 3	Ebbw Vale RFC	The Bridge Field
October 24	14:30	Carmarthen Quins	24 – 33	Swansea RFC (1 BP)	Carmarthen Park
October 24	14:30	Cross Keys RFC (1 BP)	17 – 19	Glamorgan Wanderers	Pandy Park
October 24	14:30	Pontypool RFC	21 – 68	Llandovery RFC (1 BP)	Pontypool Park
October 24	14:30	Pontypridd RFC	21 – 20	Newport RFC (1 BP)	Sardis Road
October 25	17:05	Neath RFC	27 – 39	Cardiff RFC (1 BP)	The Gnoll

=== Week 10 ===
Date	Time	Home team	Score	Away team	Venue
October 31	14:30	Aberavon RFC (1 BP)	20 – 27	Newport RFC	Talbot Athletic Ground
October 31	14:30	Cardiff RFC	12 – 20	Pontypridd RFC	The Arms Park
October 31	14:30	Cross Keys RFC	20 – 13	Bedwas RFC	Pandy Park
October 31	14:30	Ebbw Vale RFC (1 BP)	22 – 24	Llandovery RFC	Eugene Cross Park
October 31	14:30	Glamorgan Wanderers	12 – 28	Swansea RFC (1 BP)	The Memorial Ground
October 31	14:30	Llanelli RFC (1 BP)	26 – 28	Neath RFC (1 BP)	Parc y Scarlets
October 31	14:30	Pontypool RFC	10 – 40	Carmarthen Quins (1 BP)	Pontypool Park

=== Week 11 ===
Date	Time	Home team	Score	Away team	Venue
November 6	19:30	Aberavon RFC	17 – 9	Cross Keys RFC	Talbot Athletic Ground
November 7	13:00	Bedwas RFC	28 – 9	Glamorgan Wanderers	The Bridge Field
November 7	13:00	Carmarthen Quins (1 BP)	41 – 3	Ebbw Vale RFC	Carmarthen Park
November 7	13:00	Newport RFC	23 – 17	Cardiff RFC (1 BP)	Rodney Parade

=== Week 12 ===
Date	Time	Home team	Score	Away team	Venue
November 14	14:30	Cross Keys RFC	25 – 8	Carmarthen Quins	Pandy Park
November 14	14:30	Ebbw Vale RFC	14 – 7	Swansea RFC (1 BP)	Eugene Cross Park
November 14	14:30	Glamorgan Wanderers	15 – 10	Pontypool RFC (1 BP)	The Memorial Ground
November 14	14:30	Newport RFC	23 – 17	Llanelli RFC (1 BP)	Rodney Parade

=== Week 13 ===
Date	Time	Home team	Score	Away team	Venue
December 5	14:30	Aberavon RFC	10 – 3	Pontypridd RFC (1 BP)	Talbot Athletic Ground
December 5	14:30	Carmarthen Quins	18 – 0	Bedwas RFC	Carmarthen Park
December 5	14:30	Llandovery RFC	13 – 6	Glamorgan Wanderers (1 BP)	Church Bank Playing Fields
December 5	14:30	Llanelli RFC (1 BP)	10 – 16	Cardiff RFC	Parc y Scarlets
December 5	14:30	Neath RFC	21 – 13	Newport RFC	The Gnoll
December 5	14:30	Pontypool RFC	14 – 9	Ebbw Vale RFC (1 BP)	Pontypool Park
December 5	14:30	Swansea RFC	16 – 8	Cross Keys RFC	St Helens

=== Week 14 ===
Date	Time	Home team	Score	Away team	Venue
December 12	14:30	Cross Keys RFC (1 BP)	37 – 8	Llandovery RFC	Pandy Park
December 12	14:30	Neath RFC	10 – 25	Llanelli RFC	The Gnoll
December 12	14:30	Newport RFC	28 – 21	Aberavon RFC (1 BP)	Rodney Parade
December 12	14:30	Pontypridd RFC (1 BP)	20 – 21	Cardiff RFC	Sardis Road
December 12	14:30	Swansea RFC (1 BP)	36 – 24	Pontypool RFC	St Helens

=== Week 15 ===
Date	Time	Home team	Score	Away team	Venue
December 19	14:30	Neath RFC (1 BP)	25 – 20	Llandovery RFC (1 BP)	The Gnoll

=== Week 16 ===
Date	Time	Home team	Score	Away team	Venue
December 26	12:30	Swansea RFC	15 – 13	Bedwas RFC	St Helens
December 26	14:30	Cardiff RFC	0 – 26	Glamorgan Wanderers	The Arms Park
December 26	14:30	Llandovery RFC	16 – 16	Llanelli RFC	Church Bank Playing Fields
December 26	16:00	Neath RFC (1 BP)	36 – 33	Aberavon RFC (2 BP)	The Gnoll

=== Week 17 ===
Date	Time	Home team	Score	Away team	Venue
January 2	14:30	Neath RFC (1 BP)	64 – 6	Pontypool RFC	The Gnoll
January 2	18:30	Llanelli RFC	18 – 31	Swansea RFC (1 BP)	Parc y Scarlets

=== Week 18 ===
Date	Time	Home team	Score	Away team	Venue
January 23	14:30	Bedwas RFC	6 – 24	Newport RFC (1 BP)	The Bridge Field
January 23	14:30	Glamorgan Wanderers (1 BP)	17 – 20	Cross Keys RFC	The Memorial Ground
January 23	14:30	Llandovery RFC	5 – 45	Cardiff RFC (1 BP)	Church Bank Playing Fields

=== Week 19 ===
Date	Time	Home team	Score	Away team	Venue
January 27	14:30	Cross Keys RFC (1 BP)	11 – 12	Pontypridd RFC	Pandy Park
January 30	14:30	Aberavon RFC	12 – 29	Neath RFC (1 BP)	Talbot Athletic Ground
January 30	14:30	Llanelli RFC	25 – 13	Pontypridd RFC	Parc y Scarlets
January 30	14:30	Swansea RFC	33 – 28	Llandovery RFC (1 BP)	St Helens

=== Week 20 ===
Date	Time	Home team	Score	Away team	Venue
February 4	19:15	Llanelli RFC (1 BP)	49 – 3	Ebbw Vale RFC	Parc y Scarlets
February 5	19:00	Newport RFC (1 BP)	45 – 19	Cross Keys RFC	Rodney Parade
February 5	19:15	Cardiff RFC (1 BP)	30 – 5	Pontypool RFC	The Arms Park
February 6	13:00	Pontypridd RFC (1 BP)	46 – 7	Bedwas RFC	Sardis Road
February 6	13:30	Aberavon RFC	30 – 22	Carmarthen Quins	Talbot Athletic Ground
February 6	14:00	Neath RFC (1 BP)	48 – 17	Glamorgan Wanderers	The Gnoll

=== Week 21 ===
Date	Time	Home team	Score	Away team	
February 12	19:15	Llandovery RFC (1 BP)	42 – 10	Pontypool RFC	Church Bank Playing Fields
February 12	19:15	Swansea RFC (1 BP)	32 – 11	Carmarthen Quins	St Helens
February 14	14:30	Ebbw Vale RFC	23 – 6	Bedwas RFC	Eugene Cross Park
February 17	19:30	Pontypridd RFC (1 BP)	49 – 5	Pontypool RFC	Sardis Road

=== Week 22 ===
Date	Time	Home team	Score	Away team	Venue
February 23	19:15	Llanelli RFC (1 BP)	30 – 3	Bedwas RFC	Parc y Scarlets

=== Week 23 ===
Date	Time	Home team	Score	Away team	
February 27	14:30	Bedwas RFC (1 BP)	35 – 12	Cross Keys RFC	The Bridge Field
February 27	14:30	Carmarthen Quins	25 – 15	Pontypool	Carmarthen Park
February 27	14:30	Llandovery RFC (1 BP)	36 – 0	Ebbw Vale RFC	Church Bank Playing Fields
February 27	14:30	Swansea RFC (1 BP)	63 – 10	Glamorgan Wanderers	St Helens
March 2	14:30	Ebbw Vale RFC (1 BP)	15 – 19	Aberavon RFC	Eugene Cross Park
March 2	19:15	Glamorgan Wanderers (1 BP)	6 – 9	Carmarthen Quins	The Memorial Ground
March 3	19:15	Newport RFC (1 BP)	43 – 9	Swansea RFC	Rodney Parade

=== Week 24 ===
Date	Time	Home team	Score	Away team	Venue
March 6	14:30	Ebbw Vale RFC (1 BP)	8 – 13	Carmarthen Quins	Eugene Cross Park
March 6	14:30	Glamorgan Wanderers (1 BP)	17 – 24	Bedwas RFC	The Memorial Ground
March 6	14:30	Llandovery RFC	19 – 16	Cross Keys RFC (1 BP)	Church Bank Playing Fields
March 6	14:30	Pontypool RFC	27 – 24	Swansea RFC (1 BP)	Pontypool Park
March 9	19:15	Cardiff RFC (1 BP)	32 – 0	Ebbw Vale RFC	The Arms Park
March 9	19:15	Neath RFC (1 BP)	36 – 22	Carmarthen Quins	The Gnoll
March 10	19:15	Llanelli RFC (1 BP)	34 – 21	Glamorgan Wanderers	Parc y Scarlets

=== Week 25 ===
Date	Time	Home team	Score	Away team	Venue
March 12	19:15	Cross Keys RFC	10 – 27	Neath RFC (1 BP)	Pandy Park
March 12	19:15	Pontypool RFC (1 BP)	44 – 29	Bedwas RFC (1 BP)	Pontypool Park
March 12	19:15	Swansea RFC (1 BP)	37 – 15	Pontypridd RFC	St Helens
March 13	12:00	Carmarthen Quins	9 – 16	Cardiff RFC	Carmarthen Park
March 13	12:15	Llandovery RFC	27 – 37	Newport RFC (1 BP)	Church Bank Playing Fields
March 16	19:30	Llandovery RFC	33 – 17	Pontypridd RFC	Church Bank Playing Fields
March 17	19:15	Llanelli RFC (1 BP)	24 – 19	Carmarthen Quins (1 BP)	Parc y Scarlets

=== Week 26 ===
Date	Time	Home team	Score	Away team	Venue
March 19	19:15	Aberavon RFC (1 BP)	23 – 5	Llandovery RFC	Talbot Athletic Ground
March 19	19:15	Bedwas RFC	21 – 17	Cardiff RFC (1 BP)	The Bridge Field
March 19	19:15	Neath RFC	23 – 6	Swansea RFC	The Gnoll
March 19	19:30	Pontypridd RFC (1 BP)	32 – 7	Glamrgan Wanderers	Sardis Road
March 21	14:30	Cross Keys RFC	17 – 16	Ebbw Vale RFC (1 BP)	Pandy Park
March 23	19:15	Aberavon RFC	14 – 26	Swansea RFC (1 BP)	Talbot Athletic Ground
March 24	19:15	Ebbw Vale RFC (1 BP)	13 – 16	Newport RFC	Eugene Cross Park

=== Week 27 ===
Date	Time	Home team	Score	Away team	Venue
March 27	14:30	Pontypool RFC	15 – 13	Cross Keys RFC (1 BP)	Pontypool Park
March 30	19:15	Carmarthen Quins	17 – 6	Llandovery RFC	Carmarthen Park
March 30	19:15	Cross Keys RFC (1 BP)	29 – 10	Llanelli RFC	Pandy Park
March 31	19:15	Cardiff RFC	19 – 17	Newport RFC (1 BP)	The Arms Park
March 31	19:15	Glamorgan Wanderers (1 BP)	10 – 12	Aberavon RFC	The Memorial Ground
March 31	19:15	Pontypridd RFC (1 BP)	27 – 6	Ebbw Vale RFC	Sardis Road

=== Week 28 ===
Date	Time	Home team	Score	Away team	Venue
April 3	14:30	Aberavon RFC	23 – 10	Cardiff RFC	Talbot Athletic Ground
April 3	14:30	Carmarthen Quins	13 – 10	Cross Keys RFC (1 BP)	Carmarthen Park
April 3	14:30	Llandovery RFC	19 – 16	Bedwas RFC (1 BP)	Church Bank Playing Fields
April 3	14:30	Llanelli RFC	30 – 27	Newport RFC (1 BP)	Parc y Scarlets
April 3	14:30	Pontypool RFC (1 BP)	26 – 6	Glamorgan Wanderers	Pontypool Park
April 3	14:30	Swansea RFC (1 BP)	26 – 5	Ebbw Vale RFC	St Helens
April 3	15:30	Neath RFC (1 BP)	48 – 23	Pontypridd RFC	The Gnoll
April 6	19:15	Newport RFC (1 BP)	23 – 17	Glamorgan Wanderers (1 BP)	Rodney Parade
April 6	19:15	Pontypool RFC (1 BP)	27 – 26	Llanelli RFC (2 BP)	Pontypool Park
April 7	19:15	Cross Keys RFC (1 BP)	16 – 17	Cardiff RFC	Pandy Park
April 7	19:15	Pontypridd RFC (1 BP)	42 – 27	Carmarthen Quins (1 BP)	Sardis Road

=== Week 29 ===
Date	Time	Home team	Score	Away team	Venue
April 10	14:30	Bedwas RFC (2 BP)	28 – 30	Carmarthen Quins	The Bridge Field
April 10	14:30	Cardiff RFC	24 – 42	Llanelli RFC (1 BP)	The Arms Park
April 10	14:30	Cross Keys RFC (1 BP)	20 – 25	Swansea RFC	Pandy Park
April 10	14:30	Ebbw Vale RFC	22 – 12	Pontypool RFC	Eugene Cross Park
April 10	14:30	Glamorgan Wanderers	17 – 36	Llandovery RFC (1 BP)	The Memorial Ground
April 10	14:30	Pontypridd RFC	28 – 28	Aberavon RFC	Sardis Road
April 10	18:00	Newport RFC	27 – 24	Neath RFC (2 BP)	Rodney Parade
April 13	19:15	Pontypridd RFC (1 BP)	36 – 51	Neath RFC (1 BP)	Sardis Road
April 13	19:15	Cardiff RFC (1 BP)	31 – 31	Aberavon RFC	The Arms Park
April 14	19:15	Pontypool RFC	20 – 15	Newport RFC (1 BP)	Pontypool Park
April 14	19:30	Bedwas RFC	35 – 34	Llandovery RFC (2BP)	The Bridge Field

=== Week 30 ===
Date	Time	Home team	Score	Away team	Venue
April 17	14:30	Aberavon RFC (1 BP)	60 – 27	Pontypool RFC (1 BP)	Talbot Athletic Ground
April 17	14:30	Ebbw Vale RFC (1 BP)	36 – 30	Glamorgan Wanderers (2 BP)	Eugene Cross Park
April 17	14:30	Neath RFC (1 BP)	109 – 21	Bedwas RFC	The Gnoll
April 20	19:15	Bedwas RFC (2 BP)	36 – 37	Aberavon RFC (1 BP)	The Bridge Field
April 20	19:15	Carmarthen Quins	14 – 47	Newport RFC	Carmarthen Park
April 20	19:15	Ebbw Vale RFC	21 – 48	Neath RFC (1 BP)	Eugene Cross Park
April 20	19:15	Pontypridd RFC (1 BP)	48 – 14	Llanelli RFC	Sardis Road
April 20	19:15	Swansea RFC (1 BP)	34 – 19	Cardiff RFC	St Helens

== British and Irish Cup play-offs ==
=== Elimination play-offs ===
27 April 2010
19:15pm

Aberavon	18 – 35	Llandovery RFC

Talbot Athletic Ground
Referee: Leighton Hodges

Llandovery qualify for next season's British and Irish Cup, Aberavon are eliminated.

29 April 2010
20:10pm, S4C

Llanelli RFC	14 – 9	Cardiff RFC

Parc y Scarlets
Referee: David Jones

Llanelli qualify for next season's British and Irish Cup, Cardiff are eliminated.

=== Qualifying play-offs ===
27 April 2010
7:15pm

Neath RFC	34 – 3	Pontypridd RFC

The Gnoll
Referee: Phil Fear

27 April 2010
7:15pm

Swansea RFC	60 – 19	Newport RFC

St. Helens
Referee: James Jones

=== Preliminary Semi-finals ===
3 May 2010
17:15, S4C

Pontypridd RFC	21 – 12	Llandovery RFC

Sardis Road
Referee: David Bodily

Pontypridd were found guilty of fielding an ineligible player and so were expelled from the play-offs. Llandovery took their place in the semi-finals.

11 May 2010
19:15

Newport RFC	48 – 35	Llanelli RFC

Rodney Parade
Attendance: 560
Referee: Gwyn Morris

=== Semi-finals ===
13 May 2010
19:15

Neath RFC	26 – 18	Llandovery RFC

The Gnoll
Referee: James Jones

17 May 2010
19:15

Swansea RFC	31 – 17	Newport RFC

St. Helens
Referee: Tim Hayes

=== Final ===
22 May 2010
13:00

Neath RFC	22 – 22	Swansea RFC

Cardiff Arms Park
Attendance: 541
Referee: David Jones

Neath win 3–1 on try count
