= 2017–18 Principality Premiership =

- Countries: Wales
- Date: 26 August 2017 – 19 May 2018
- Champions: Merthyr (2nd title)
- Runners-up: Llandovery
- Relegated: none
- Matches played: 232

The 2017–18 Principality Premiership was the second season of the new format of the Principality Premiership, the top tier of club rugby in Wales run by the Welsh Rugby Union. It was contested by sixteen Welsh clubs following an expansion from twelve teams at the start of the 2016–17 season. This season will be "ring-fenced" and relegation will return at the end of the 2018–19 season. The competition was won by Merthyr for the second consecutive year; this season also marked a "double" for Merthyr as they also won the 2017–18 WRU National Cup.

== Structure ==
The Principality Premiership's structure has altered from the previous season. The teams will be split into two conferences (East and West) for the first half of the season. Each team will play each other team in their conference home and away. After 14 rounds, The league is amalgamated and all points reset to zero. However, clubs are awarded points based on their finishing position in their respective conference e.g. the 1st place team in a conference will receive 8 points, 2nd place – 7 points etc. right down to 8th place – 1 point. Each team will then play the other once, either home or away, for a grand total of 29 games. Unlike previous seasons, the winner will be determined by league position and not a play off system. Therefore, the league leader will be declared champions. This is the second season in which the "ring-fenced" system will be implemented, meaning no team is in danger of relegation until the 2018–19 season. However, ring-fencing will be under review at the end of this season.

== Teams ==
The same 16 teams that competed the previous season competed again this season. Merthyr were the reigning champions having beaten Aberavon 22–18 in last year's final.

Locations of the 2017–18 Principality Premiership teams with colour markers to represent the region they belong to:

Orange = Dragons
Blue = Cardiff Blues
Black = Ospreys
Red = Scarlets

- RGC acts as a de facto club representing North Wales

Club	Stadium	Capacity	Area
Aberavon	Talbot Athletic Ground	3,000	Port Talbot, Neath Port Talbot
Bargoed	Bargoed Park	1,500	Bargoed, Caerphilly
Bedwas	Bridge Field	2,000	Bedwas, Caerphilly
Bridgend	Brewery Field	8,000	Bridgend
Cardiff	Cardiff Arms Park	12,125	Cardiff
Carmarthen Quins	Carmarthen Park	3,000	Carmarthen, Carmarthenshire
Cross Keys	Pandy Park	3,000	Crosskeys, Caerphilly
Ebbw Vale	Eugene Cross Park	8,000	Ebbw Vale, Blaenau Gwent
Llandovery	Church Bank Playing Fields	3,000	Llandovery, Carmarthenshire
Llanelli	Parc y Scarlets	14,870	Llanelli, Carmarthenshire
Merthyr	The Wern	4,500	Merthyr Tydfil
Neath	The Gnoll	6,000	Neath, Neath Port Talbot
Newport	Rodney Parade	11,676	Newport
Pontypridd	Sardis Road	7,861	Pontypridd, Rhondda Cynon Taf
RGC 1404	Eirias Stadium	6,000	Colwyn Bay, Conwy
Swansea	St Helen's	4,500	Swansea

== Standings (East) ==
2017–18 Principality Premiership Table (East)
Pos	Team	Pld	W	D	L	PF	PA	PD	TF	TA	TB	LB	Pts
1	Merthyr	14	11	0	3	480	338	+142	68	38	10	1	55
2	Pontypridd	14	11	0	3	426	313	+113	55	42	8	1	53
3	Bedwas	14	9	0	5	385	276	+109	47	31	5	2	43
4	Cardiff	14	7	0	7	339	323	+16	38	40	3	3	34
5	Newport	14	6	0	8	366	406	−40	48	55	5	2	31
6	Cross Keys	14	6	0	8	316	354	−38	41	43	4	1	29
7	Ebbw Vale	14	4	0	10	246	428	−182	26	56	0	2	18
8	Bargoed	14	2	0	12	245	365	−120	26	44	2	4	14

Updated to match(es) played on 23 December 2017. Source: "Principality Premiership". allwalessport.
Rules for classification: If teams are level at any stage, tiebreakers are applied in the following order:
1. Number of matches won
2. Number of tries scored
3. Total number of points for
4. Difference between points for and against
After 14 rounds, the two conferences merge and points are reset. Points are given according to league position (1st - 8 points, 2nd - 7 points, 3rd - 6 points etc.)

== Standings (West) ==
2017–18 Principality Premiership Table (West)
Pos	Team	Pld	W	D	L	PF	PA	PD	TF	TA	TB	LB	Pts
1	RGC 1404	14	11	1	2	375	294	+81	42	41	5	1	52
2	Llandovery	14	10	0	4	313	195	+118	41	21	7	1	48
3	Carmarthen Quins	14	10	0	4	343	271	+72	43	32	4	1	45
4	Aberavon	14	7	0	7	345	336	+9	49	37	5	2	35
5	Llanelli	14	6	0	8	304	368	−64	41	48	7	1	32
6	Bridgend	14	5	0	9	271	342	−71	29	47	2	3	25
7	Swansea	14	3	1	10	283	331	−48	33	43	3	6	23
8	Neath	14	3	0	11	254	351	−97	36	45	1	3	16

Updated to match(es) played on 26 December 2017. Source: "Principality Premiership". allwalessport.
Rules for classification: If teams are level at any stage, tiebreakers are applied in the following order:
1. Number of matches won
2. Number of tries scored
3. Total number of points for
4. Difference between points for and against
After 14 rounds, the two conferences merge and points are reset. Points are given according to league position (1st - 8 points, 2nd - 7 points, 3rd - 6 points etc.)

== Phase Two ==
After 14 rounds, the two conferences merge and points are reset to zero. However, points are awarded to teams prior to this phase according to league position (1st – 8 points, 2nd – 7 points, 3rd – 6 points etc.). Each team now plays each other team once, either home or away, for a grand total of 29 games over the entire season. There is no play-off system this season and the league leader will be crowned 2017–18 Principality Premiership Champions.

== Standings (Phase Two) ==
2017–18 Principality Premiership Table (Total)
Pos	Team	Pld	W	D	L	PF	PA	PD	TF	TA	TB	LB	LPP	Pts
1	Merthyr (C)	15	13	0	2	477	263	+214	66	29	10	1	8	71
2	Pontypridd	15	12	0	3	457	327	+130	64	42	7	0	7	62
3	Llandovery	15	12	0	3	391	310	+81	48	38	7	1	7	63
4	RGC 1404	15	9	1	5	513	328	+185	68	39	8	4	8	58
5	Carmarthen Quins	15	10	1	4	364	303	+61	47	37	6	3	6	57
6	Ebbw Vale	15	10	0	5	327	237	+90	34	27	3	3	2	48
7	Bedwas	15	8	0	7	413	348	+65	60	42	6	4	6	48
8	Cardiff	15	7	0	8	394	352	+42	50	45	6	4	5	43
9	Newport	15	7	0	8	366	381	−15	44	50	6	5	4	43
10	Bridgend	15	8	0	7	319	336	−17	39	44	2	2	3	39
11	Cross Keys	15	6	0	9	346	394	−48	46	54	8	2	3	37
12	Aberavon	15	6	0	9	285	298	−13	41	36	3	5	5	37
13	Llanelli	15	6	0	9	399	485	−86	52	66	6	2	4	36
14	Swansea	15	2	0	13	255	472	−217	30	65	1	5	2	16
15	Bargoed	15	2	0	13	231	484	−253	31	70	3	1	1	13
16	Neath	15	1	0	14	277	496	−219	33	69	2	5	1	12

Updated to match(es) played on 19 May 2018. Source: "Principality Premiership". allwalessport.
Rules for classification: If teams are level at any stage, tiebreakers are applied in the following order:
1. Number of matches won
2. Number of tries scored
3. Total number of points for
4. Difference between points for and against
The two conferences merged after 14 original rounds and points were reset. Points were given according to league position (1st - 8 points, 2nd - 7 points, 3rd - 6 points etc.)
(C) Champion
