= 2007–08 Welsh Premier Division =

The 2007–08 Welsh Premier Division or 2007–08 Principality Premiership for sponsorship reasons was the sixteenth Welsh Premier Division. The season began on Saturday 1 September 2007 and ended on Wednesday 7 May 2008. Fourteen teams played each other on a home and away basis. This was also the first season where teams earned four points for a win and two points for a draw as well as a bonus point for scoring four or more tries in a match. The losing team also earned a bonus point if they lost by seven points or less.

== Stadiums ==
2007–08 Welsh Premier Division clubs

Team	Stadium	Capacity	City/Area
Aberavon RFC	Talbot Athletic Ground	5,000*	Port Talbot, Neath Port Talbot
Bedwas RFC	Bridge Field	2,000	Bedwas, Caerphilly
Bridgend RFC	Brewery Field	12,000	Bridgend
Cardiff RFC	Cardiff Arms Park	14,000	Cardiff
Cross Keys RFC	Pandy Park	3,000	Crosskeys, Caerphilly
Ebbw Vale RFC	Eugene Cross Park	8,000	Ebbw Vale, Blaenau Gwent
Glamorgan Wanderers RFC	The Memorial Ground	3,000	Ely, Cardiff
Llandovery RFC	Church Bank Playing Fields	5,000	Llandovery, Carmarthenshire
Llanelli RFC	Stradey Park	10,800	Llanelli, Carmarthenshire
Maesteg RFC	Llynfi Road	N/A	Maesteg, Bridgend
Neath RFC	The Gnoll	5,000	Neath, Neath Port Talbot
Newport RFC	Rodney Parade	11,700	Newport
Pontypridd RFC	Sardis Road	7,861	Pontypridd, Rhondda Cynon Taf
Swansea RFC	St. Helen’s Ground	4,500	Swansea

- 1,500 of them are seats

== Table ==
POS	TEAM	PL	W	D	L	PF	PA	DIFF	TF	TA	TB	LB	PTS	STATUS
1	Neath	26	19	1	6	697	381	316	94	35	10	5	93	Welsh Premier Division Champions and remained in the Welsh Premier Division for the 2008-09 season
2	Cardiff Rugby	26	18	1	7	544	449	95	57	52	4	2	80	Remained in the Welsh Premier Division for the 2008-09 season
3	Pontypridd	26	16	1	9	523	411	112	58	44	6	5	77	Remained in the Welsh Premier Division for the 2008-09 season
4	Swansea	26	16	2	8	547	487	60	61	56	6	2	76	Remained in the Welsh Premier Division for the 2008-09 season
5	Ebbw Vale	26	15	2	9	499	430	69	62	42	7	3	74	Remained in the Welsh Premier Division for the 2008-09 season
6	Aberavon	26	15	1	10	591	571	20	72	62	7	3	72	Remained in the Welsh Premier Division for the 2008-09 season
7	Newport	26	12	0	14	441	462	-21	45	55	4	8	60	Remained in the Welsh Premier Division for the 2008-09 season
8	Bedwas	26	11	2	13	499	474	25	55	54	4	8	60	Remained in the Welsh Premier Division for the 2008-09 season
9	Llanelli	26	10	4	12	527	468	59	66	49	5	7	60	Remained in the Welsh Premier Division for the 2008-09 season
10	The Wanderers	26	10	2	14	439	451	-12	47	50	3	8	55	Remained in the Welsh Premier Division for the 2008-09 season
11	Cross Keys	26	10	1	15	430	475	-45	46	50	1	8	51	Remained in the Welsh Premier Division for the 2008-09 season
12	Bridgend	26	9	1	16	397	515	-118	35	57	1	8	47	Remained in the Welsh Premier Division for the 2008-09 season
13	Llandovery	26	7	0	19	384	684	-300	39	84	4	1	33	Remained in the Welsh Premier Division for the 2008-09 season
14	Maesteg	26	4	2	20	415	675	-260	43	90	0	6	26	Relegated to Division 1 West for the 2008-09 season

== Fixtures & results ==
=== Matchday 1 ===
Saturday 1 September, 2:30pm
Aberavon	13 - 26	Llanelli
Bedwas	12 - 21	Pontypridd
Cross Keys	21 - 35	Cardiff Rugby
Ebbw Vale	25 - 26	Swansea
Neath	42 - 6	Bridgend
Newport	3 - 6	Llandovery
The Wanderers	41 - 28	Maesteg

=== Matchday 2 ===
Saturday 8 September, 2:30pm
Bedwas	54 - 25	Llandovery
Bridgend	15 - 27	Newport
Cardiff Rugby	25 - 23	Aberavon
Llanelli	10 - 17	Neath
Maesteg	13 - 13	Ebbw Vale
Pontypridd	33 - 20	Swansea
The Wanderers	20 - 21	Cross Keys

=== Matchday 3 ===
Saturday 22 September, 2:30pm
Cross Keys	25 - 26	Bedwas
Ebbw Vale	28 - 13	Bridgend
Llandovery	27 - 35	Pontypridd
Llanelli	53 - 19	Maesteg
Neath	27 - 15	The Wanderers
Newport	20 - 24	Aberavon
Swansea	34 - 34	Cardiff Rugby

=== Matchday 4 ===
Saturday 29 September, 2:30pm
Aberavon	17 - 22	Ebbw Vale
Bedwas	19 - 25	The Wanderers
Llandovery	10 - 26	Cardiff Rugby
Llanelli	34 - 13	Bridgend
Maesteg	16 - 23	Neath
Pontypridd	6 - 22	Cross Keys
Swansea	22 - 26	Newport

=== Matchday 5 ===
Saturday 13 October, 2:30pm
Aberavon	23 - 12	Pontypridd
Bedwas	19 - 6	Swansea
Bridgend	15 - 18	Cardiff Rugby
Cross Keys	37 - 10	Llandovery
Neath	17 - 24	Ebbw Vale
Newport	20 - 0	Maesteg
The Wanderers	15 - 15	Llanelli

=== Matchday 6 ===
Saturday 20 October, 2:30pm
Bridgend	16 - 19	Aberavon
Cardiff Rugby	12 - 18	The Wanderers
Cross Keys	18 - 23	Llanelli
Ebbw Vale	15 - 12	Bedwas
Llandovery	6 - 41	Neath
Pontypridd	19 - 3	Newport
Swansea	29 - 13	Maesteg

=== Matchday 7 ===
Saturday 27 October, 2:30pm
Aberavon	19 - 18	Swansea
Bridgend	33 - 14	Llandovery
Ebbw Vale	12 - 9	Cardiff Rugby
Llanelli	13 - 13	Pontypridd
Maesteg	10 - 10	Cross Keys
Neath	34 - 13	Bedwas
The Wanderers	20 - 16	Newport

=== Matchday 8 ===
Saturday 3 November, 2:30pm
Aberavon	15 - 18	The Wanderers
Bedwas	30 - 15	Llanelli
Cardiff Rugby	21 - 16	Newport
Llandovery	35 - 17	Maesteg
Neath	19 - 12	Cross Keys
Pontypridd	12 - 16	Ebbw Vale
Swansea	23 - 16	Bridgend

=== Matchday 9 ===
Saturday 10 November, 2:30pm
Bedwas	27 - 28	Maesteg
Cross Keys	23 - 17	Bridgend
Llandovery	15 - 20	Aberavon
Llanelli	37 - 13	Cardiff Rugby
Llanelli	v	Cardiff Rugby
Newport	11 - 12	Ebbw Vale
Pontypridd RFC	15 - 10	Neath
Swansea	9 - 26	The Wanderers

=== Matchday 10 ===
Saturday 17 November, 2:30pm
Aberavon	30 - 6	Cross Keys
Bridgend	27 - 27	Bedwas
Maesteg	9 - 41	Pontypridd
Neath	13 - 20	Cardiff Rugby
Swansea	30 - 9	Llandovery
The Wanderers	16 - 8	Ebbw Vale
Friday 23 November, 7:15pm
Newport	33 - 19	Llanelli

=== Matchday 11 (3/7) ===
Saturday 1 December, 2:30pm
Cardiff Rugby	28 - 5	Maesteg
Cross Keys	18 - 7	Swansea
Ebbw Vale	16 - 0	Llanelli

=== Matchday 12 ===
Tuesday 22 December
2:30pm
Cardiff Rugby	29 - 8	Bedwas
Newport	19 - 14	Cross Keys
The Wanderers	16 - 20	Pontypridd
5:30pm
Llanelli	19 - 19	Swansea
Wednesday 26 December, 2:30pm
Ebbw Vale	31 - 13	Llandovery
Maesteg	3 - 8	Bridgend
Neath	43 - 12	Aberavon

=== Matchday 13 ===
Saturday 29 December
2:30pm
Aberavon	25 - 21	Maesteg
Bedwas	21 - 8	Newport
Bridgend	12 - 7	The Wanderers
Cross Keys	11 - 10	Ebbw Vale
Llandovery	3 - 28	Llanelli
Swansea	14 - 27	Neath
5:30pm
Pontypridd	10 - 23	Cardiff Rugby

=== Matchday 14 ===
Saturday 5 January, 2:30pm
Aberavon	42 - 14	Cardiff Rugby
Cross Keys	13 - 8	The Wanderers
Ebbw Vale	28 - 13	Maesteg
Llandovery	7 - 25	Bedwas
Neath	18 - 18	Llanelli
Newport	16 - 12	Bridgend
Swansea	10 - 8	Pontypridd

=== Matchday 15 ===
Saturday 12 January, 2:30pm
Aberavon	27 - 15	Newport
Bedwas	14 - 18	Cross Keys
Bridgend	32 - 18	Ebbw Vale
Maesteg	17 - 13	Llanelli
Pontypridd	29 - 7	Llandovery
The Wanderers	22 - 35	Neath
Sunday 13 January, 2:30pm
Cardiff Rugby	5 - 14	Swansea

=== Matchday 16 (6/7) ===
Saturday 19 January, 2:30pm
Bridgend	9 - 7	Llanelli
Cardiff Rugby	15 - 0	Llandovery
Cross Keys	0 - 13	Pontypridd
Neath	17 - 6	Maesteg
Newport	15 - 18	Swansea
The Wanderers	14 - 0	Bedwas

=== Matchday 17 (1/7) ===
Wednesday 30 January, 2:30pm
Cardiff Rugby	23 - 19	Cross Keys

=== Matchday 18 ===
Friday 8 February, 7:15pm
Cardiff Rugby	12 - 10	Bridgend
Ebbw Vale	12 - 22	Neath
Llandovery	19 - 5	Cross Keys
Llanelli	9 - 3	The Wanderers
Maesteg	27 - 39	Newport
Pontypridd	23 - 10	Aberavon
Swansea	10 - 3	Bedwas

=== Matchday 17 (2/7) ===
Friday 22 February, 7:15pm
Bridgend	16 - 23	Neath

=== Matchday 19 ===
Saturday 1 March, 2:30pm
Aberavon	33 - 3	Bridgend
Bedwas	23 - 20	Ebbw Vale
Llanelli	32 - 26	Cross Keys
Maesteg	15 - 30	Swansea
Neath	80 - 0	Llandovery
Newport	36 - 31	Pontypridd
The Wanderers	3 - 26	Cardiff Rugby

=== Matchday 11 (4/7) ===
Wednesday 5 March, 2:30pm
Newport	16 - 28	Neath

=== Matchday 17 (3/7) ===
Friday 7 March, 7:15pm
Pontypridd	9 - 6	Bedwas

=== Matchday 20 (6/7) ===
Friday 14 March, 7:15pm
Bridgend	10 - 25	Swansea
Cross Keys	9 - 21	Neath
Ebbw Vale	13 - 6	Pontypridd
Llanelli	12 - 13	Bedwas
Maesteg	20 - 10	Llandovery
The Wanderers	10 - 14	Aberavon

=== Matchday 21 ===
Saturday 22 March, 2:30pm
Bedwas	27 - 11	Cardiff Rugby
Bridgend	21 - 18	Maesteg
Cross Keys	10 - 14	Newport
Llandovery	31 - 22	Ebbw Vale
Pontypridd	23 - 13	The Wanderers
Monday 24 March, 2:30pm
Aberavon	29 - 22	Neath
Swansea	25 - 24	Llanelli

=== Matchday 22 (1/7) ===
Tuesday 25 March, 7:00pm
Ebbw Vale	16 - 12	Newport (M 9)

=== Matchday 23 (6/7) ===
Saturday 29 March, 2:30pm
Bedwas	6 - 17	Neath
Cardiff Rugby	21 - 0	Ebbw Vale
Cross Keys	23 - 10	Maesteg
Llandovery	10 - 3	Bridgend
Newport	16 - 8	The Wanderers
Swansea	27 - 17	Aberavon

=== Matchday 22 (3/7) ===
Saturday 5 April, 2:30pm
Cardiff Rugby	38 - 20	Llanelli
Maesteg	8 - 30	Bedwas

=== Mixed matchdays ===
Tuesday 8 April, 7:15pm
Aberavon	42 - 26	Llandovery (M 22 - 4/7)
Newport	24 - 11	Cardiff Rugby (M 20 - 7/7)

=== Mixed matchdays ===
Wednesday 9 April, 7:15pm
Pontypridd	33 - 29	Llanelli (M 23 - 7/7)
The Wanderers	6 - 13	Swansea (M 22 - 5/7)

=== Matchday 24 ===
Saturday 12 April
2:30pm
Aberavon	33 - 27	Bedwas
Bridgend	20 - 0	Pontypridd
Llanelli	13 - 28	Ebbw Vale
Maesteg	20 - 24	Cardiff Rugby
The Wanderers	32 - 12	Llandovery
4:30pm
Neath	23 - 10	Newport
5:00pm
Swansea	23 - 19	Cross Keys

=== Matchday 16 (7/7) ===
Tuesday 15 April, 7:15pm
Ebbw Vale	48 - 20	Aberavon

=== Matchday 11 (5/7) ===
Wednesday 16 April, 7:15pm
Pontypridd	31 - 10	Bridgend

=== Matchday 25 ===
Saturday 19 April, 2:30pm
Bedwas	14 - 17	Bridgend
Cross Keys	31 - 14	Aberavon
Ebbw Vale	13 - 13	The Wanderers
Llandovery	15 - 26	Swansea
Llanelli	10 - 17	Newport
Pontypridd	31 - 26	Maesteg
Sunday 20 April, 4:10pm
Cardiff Rugby	24 - 22	Neath

=== Matchday 26 (3/7) ===
Saturday 26 April, 2:30pm
Ebbw Vale	29 - 12	Cross Keys
Llanelli	20 - 12	Llandovery
Newport	9 - 12	Bedwas

=== Mixed matchdays ===
Tuesday 29 April, 7:15pm
Bridgend	23 - 7	Cross Keys (M 22 - 6/7)
Wednesday 30 April
7:15pm
Llanelli	28 - 7	Aberavon (M 17 - 4/7)
7:30pm
Llandovery	26 - 10	The Wanderers (M 11 - 6/7)

=== Mixed matchdays ===
Friday 2 May, 7:15pm
Neath	10 - 23	Pontypridd (M 22 - 7/7)
Swansea	42 - 20	Ebbw Vale (M 17 - 5/7)

=== Mixed matchdays ===
Saturday 3 May, 2:30pm
Bedwas	31 - 31	Aberavon (M 11 - 7/7)
Llandovery	36 - 0	Newport (M 17 - 6/7)
Maesteg	29 - 24	The Wanderers (M 17 - 7/7)

=== Matchday 26 (7/7) ===
Tuesday 6 May, 7:15pm
Cardiff Rugby	27 - 26	Pontypridd
Neath	46 - 27	Swansea
Wednesday 7 May, 7:15pm
Maesteg	24 - 32	Aberavon
The Wanderers	36 - 20	Bridgend
