= 2019–20 Indigo Group Premiership =

- Countries: Wales
- Date: 6 September 2019 – 7 March 2020 (cancelled)
- Champions: NONE
- Relegated: NONE
- Matches played: 100 (out of a scheduled 132)

The 2019–20 Indigo Group Premiership was the first season of the new format of the Welsh Premiership, the top tier of club rugby in Wales run by the Welsh Rugby Union. It was contested by twelve Welsh clubs following a reduction from sixteen teams at the end of the 2018–19 season.

The season was cancelled on 20 March 2020 due to the COVID-19 pandemic.

== Structure ==
The structure was a traditional league. Each team would play each other team on a home and away basis for a total of 22 games. League points were awarded as such – 4 points for a win, 2 for a draw and 0 for a loss. Teams could also earn an additional bonus point by scoring four or more tries in a match and/or losing by less than seven points. One team would be relegated to the Welsh Championship at the end of the season, provided that the Welsh Championship winners met the criteria for an A Licence. The top 6 teams from the previous 2018–19 season would play against teams from the new Scottish Super 6 league in a cross-border competition in April and May 2020.

== Teams ==
The top 12 teams that competed in the previous season took part again this season. Merthyr were the reigning champions and were aiming to win the league for the fourth year in succession.

Locations of the 2019–20 Indigo Group Premiership teams with colour markers to represent the region they belong to:

Orange = Dragons
Blue = Cardiff Blues
Black = Ospreys
Red = Scarlets

- RGC acts as a de facto club representing North Wales

Club	Stadium	Capacity	Area
Aberavon	Talbot Athletic Ground	3,000	Port Talbot, Neath Port Talbot
Bridgend	Brewery Field	8,000	Bridgend
Cardiff	Cardiff Arms Park	12,125	Cardiff
Carmarthen Quins	Carmarthen Park	3,000	Carmarthen, Carmarthenshire
Ebbw Vale	Eugene Cross Park	8,000	Ebbw Vale, Blaenau Gwent
Llandovery	Church Bank Playing Fields	3,000	Llandovery, Carmarthenshire
Llanelli	Parc y Scarlets	14,870	Llanelli, Carmarthenshire
Merthyr	The Wern	4,500	Merthyr Tydfil
Newport	Rodney Parade	11,676	Newport
Pontypridd	Sardis Road	7,861	Pontypridd, Rhondda Cynon Taf
RGC 1404	Eirias Stadium	6,000	Colwyn Bay, Conwy
Swansea	St Helen's	4,500	Swansea

== Standings ==
2019–20 Indigo Group Premiership Table
Pos	Team	Pld	W	D	L	PF	PA	PD	TF	TA	TB	LB	Pts
1	Cardiff	16	13	0	3	391	243	+148	50	29	7	2	61
2	Carmarthen Quins	17	10	3	4	372	278	+94	47	32	5	3	54
3	Aberavon	16	11	0	5	371	272	+99	45	32	4	5	53
4	Llandovery	16	9	2	5	344	285	+59	44	32	4	4	48
5	Pontypridd	18	10	0	8	391	373	+18	41	46	2	5	47
6	Merthyr	18	8	0	10	362	374	−12	45	40	5	7	44
7	RGC 1404	17	8	1	8	409	381	+28	54	50	5	4	43
8	Newport	15	7	0	8	294	273	+21	38	32	4	5	37
9	Swansea	17	7	0	10	246	292	−46	29	36	3	4	35
10	Llanelli	15	6	0	9	293	412	−119	38	52	2	1	27
11	Ebbw Vale	17	4	2	11	280	348	−68	28	41	1	6	27
12	Bridgend	18	3	0	15	271	493	−222	29	66	1	6	19

Updated to match(es) played on unknown. Source: "Indigo Group Premiership". allwalessport.
Rules for classification: If teams are level at any stage, tiebreakers are applied in the following order:
1. Number of matches won
2. Number of tries scored
3. Ratio between points for:points against
