= 2022–23 Indigo Group Premiership =

2022–23 Welsh rugby

- Countries: Wales
- Date: 3 September 2022 – 21 May 2023
- Champions: Llandovery RFC
- Runners-up: Cardiff RFC
- Relegated: No relegation
- Matches played: 132 (including 3 walkovers)

Official website
- community.wru.wales

The 2022–23 Indigo Group Premiership was the fourth season of the current format of the rugby union competition Welsh Premier Division. It began on 3 September 2022. For sponsorship reasons, it was known as Indigo Group Premiership.

== Structure ==
The structure reverted to its traditional league format following truncation the previous season. Each team played each other team on a home and away basis for a total of 22 games. League points were awarded as follows – four points for a win, two for a draw and nil for a loss. Teams could also earn an additional bonus point by scoring four or more tries in a match and/or losing by fewer than seven points. The structure saw the top four teams compete in an end of season playoff format, first v fourth and second v third, with the final taking place at the ground of the highest seed and the winning team being declared champions. There was no relegation this season following an expansion from 12 to 14 teams for the 2023–24 season.

== Teams ==
=== Indigo Group Premiership ===
Locations of the 2022–23 Indigo Group Premiership teams with colour markers to represent the region they belong to:

Blue = Cardiff Rugby
Orange = Dragons
Black = Ospreys
Red = Scarlets

- RGC acts as a de facto club representing North Wales

Team	Coach	Captain	Stadium	Capacity
Aberavon	Jason Hyatt	Joe Tomalin-Reeves	Talbot Athletic Ground	8,000
Bridgend	Steve Jones	Nathan Edwards	Brewery Field	8,000
Cardiff	Steve Law	Morgan Allen	Cardiff Arms Park	12,125
Carmarthen Quins	Craig Evans	Lee Taylor	Carmarthen Park	3,000
Ebbw Vale	Jason Strange	Joe Franchi	Eugene Cross Park	8,000
Llandovery	Gareth Potter	Lee Rees	Church Bank	3,000
Llanelli	Phil John	Tom Phillips	Parc y Scarlets	14,870
Merthyr	Rowland Phillips	Craig Locke	The Wern	4,500
Newport	Tyron Morris	Matt O'Brien	Newport Stadium	5,058
Pontypridd	Chris Dicomidis (player-coach)	Kristian Parker	Sardis Road	7,861
RGC 1404	Ceri Jones	Afon Bagshaw	Eirias Stadium	6,080
Swansea	Hugh Gustafson	Tom Sloane	St Helens Ground	4,500

== Standings ==
2022–23 Indigo Group Premiership Table
Pos	Team	Pld	W	D	L	PF	PA	PD	TF	TA	TB	LB	Pts
1	Cardiff	22	19	0	3	733	382	+351	96	44	12	2	90
2	Llandovery	22	18	0	4	676	407	+269	86	49	11	1	84
3	Merthyr	22	16	0	6	625	435	+190	89	49	15	3	82
4	Newport	22	15	0	7	665	436	+229	94	56	13	6	79
5	Ebbw Vale	22	14	0	8	540	426	+114	63	50	7	6	69
6	Aberavon	22	12	0	10	605	540	+65	86	67	11	3	62
7	RGC	22	11	0	11	576	476	+100	74	58	9	5	58
8	Bridgend	22	9	0	13	458	574	−116	56	76	5	4	45
9	Carmarthen Quins	22	6	0	16	356	674	−318	45	90	4	3	31
10	Pontypridd	22	5	0	17	410	552	−142	43	69	5	6	31
11	Swansea	22	5	0	17	415	684	−269	53	101	6	2	28
12	Llanelli	22	2	0	20	395	868	−473	54	130	5	2	11 (Note: Llanelli were deducted 4 points for failing to fulfil a fixture.)

Updated to match(es) played on 6 May 2023. Source: "Indigo Group Premiership".
Rules for classification: If teams are level at any stage, tiebreakers are applied in the following order:
1. Number of matches won
2. Number of tries scored
3. Ratio between points for:points against
  Notes:

== Fixtures & results ==
=== Week 1 ===
Date	Home team	Score	Away team	Venue
3 September	Llanelli RFC	46 - 26	Swansea RFC	Parc y Scarlets
3 September	Newport RFC	22 - 25	Ebbw Vale RFC	Newport Stadium
3 September	Aberavon RFC	45 - 14	Bridgend Ravens	Talbot Athletic Ground
3 September	Merthyr RFC	22 - 15	RGC 1404	The Wern
3 September	Carmarthen Quins	3 - 19	Llandovery RFC	Carmarthen Park
3 September	Pontypridd RFC	12 - 26	Cardiff RFC	Sardis Road

=== Week 2 ===
All matches on 10 September postponed due to the death of Queen Elizabeth II.

Date	Home team	Score	Away team	Venue
8 September	Swansea RFC	17 - 39	Aberavon RFC	St Helen's
10 September	RGC 1404	P – P	Newport RFC	–
10 September	Bridgend Ravens	P – P	Carmarthen Quins	–
10 September	Cardiff RFC	P – P	Merthyr RFC	–
10 September	Llandovery RFC	P – P	Pontypridd RFC	–
10 September	Ebbw Vale RFC	P – P	Llanelli RFC	–

=== Week 3 ===
Date	Home team	Score	Away team	Venue
22 September	Newport RFC	32 - 34	Cardiff RFC	Newport Stadium
24 September	Pontypridd RFC	40 - 8	Bridgend Ravens	Sardis Road
24 September	Merthyr RFC	12 - 36	Llandovery RFC	The Wern
24 September	Aberavon RFC	31 - 24	Llanelli RFC	Talbot Athletic Ground
24 September	Carmarthen Quins	10 - 24	Swansea RFC	Carmarthen Park
24 September	Ebbw Vale RFC	24 - 8	RGC 1404	Eugene Cross Park

=== Week 4 ===
Date	Home team	Score	Away team	Venue
29 September	Bridgend Ravens	10 - 34	Merthyr RFC	Brewery Field
1 October	Llanelli RFC	12 - 41	RGC 1404	Parc y Scarlets
1 October	Swansea RFC	45 - 22	Pontypridd RFC	St Helen's
1 October	Cardiff RFC	20 - 19	Ebbw Vale RFC	Cardiff Arms Park
1 October	Aberavon RFC	33 - 24	Carmarthen Quins	Talbot Athletic Ground
1 October	Llandovery RFC	15 - 13	Newport RFC	Church Bank Playing Fields

=== Week 5 ===
Date	Home team	Score	Away team	Venue
6 October	Ebbw Vale RFC	20 - 23	Llandovery RFC	Eugene Cross Park
8 October	Carmarthen Quins	28 - 27	Llanelli RFC	Carmarthen Park
8 October	Merthyr RFC	35 - 12	Swansea RFC	The Wern
8 October	Pontypridd RFC	18 - 33	Aberavon RFC	Sardis Road
8 October	RGC 1404	21 - 25	Cardiff RFC	Eirias Stadium
8 October	Newport RFC	P – P	Bridgend Ravens	–

=== Week 6 ===
Date	Home team	Score	Away team	Venue
13 October	Carmarthen Quins	15 - 21	Pontypridd RFC	Carmarthen Park
15 October	Aberavon RFC	39 - 32	Merthyr RFC	Talbot Athletic Ground
15 October	Llandovery RFC	36 - 12	RGC 1404	Church Bank Playing Fields
15 October	Swansea RFC	24 - 20	Newport RFC	St Helen's
15 October	Bridgend Ravens	29 - 27	Ebbw Vale	Brewery Field
18 October	Llanelli RFC	19 - 57	Cardiff RFC	Parc y Scarlets

=== Week 7 ===
Date	Home team	Score	Away team	Venue
27 October	Merthyr RFC	37 - 7	Carmarthen Quins	The Were
29 October	Cardiff RFC	29 - 26	Llandovery RFC	Cardiff Arms Park
29 October	Pontypridd RFC	29 - 31	Llanelli RFC	Sardis Road
29 October	Ebbw Vale RFC	22 - 9	Swansea RFC	Eugene Cross Park
29 October	RGC 1404	27 - 13	Bridgend Ravens	Eirias Stadium
30 October	Newport RFC	30 - 20	Aberavon RFC	Newport Stadium

=== Week 8 ===
Date	Home team	Score	Away team	Venue
10 November	Llanelli RFC	21 - 54	Llandovery RFC	Parc y Scarlets
11 November	Aberavon RFC	17 - 24	Ebbw Vale	Talbot Athletic Ground
12 November	Swansea RFC	19 - 47	RGC 1404	St Helen's
12 November	Carmarthen Quins	17 - 34	Newport RFC	Carmarthen Park
12 November	Bridgend Ravens	16 - 43	Cardiff RFC	Brewery Field
12 November	Pontypridd RFC	18 - 24	Merthyr RFC	Sardis Road

=== Week 9 ===
Date	Home team	Score	Away team	Venue
17 November	Ebbw Vale RFC	38 - 7	Carmarthen Quins	Eugene Cross Park
17 November	Cardiff RFC	45 - 0	Swansea RFC	Cardiff Arms Park
18 November	Newport RFC	33 - 16	Pontypridd RFC	Newport Stadium
18 November	Llandovery RFC	28 - 13	Bridgend Ravens	Church Bank Playing Fields
19 November	RGC 1404	34 - 26	Aberavon RFC	Eirias Stadium

=== Week 10 ===
Numerous matches postponed due to weather

Date	Home team	Score	Away team	Venue
8 December	Aberavon RFC	30 - 23	Cardiff RFC	Talbot Athletic Ground
10 December	Swansea RFC	P - P	Llandovery RFC	–
10 December	Swansea RFC	P - P	Llandovery RFC	–
10 December	Bridgend Ravens	P - P	Llanelli RFC	–
10 December	Pontypridd RFC	22 - 23	Ebbw Vale RFC	Sardis Road
10 December	RGC 1404	40 - 3	Carmarthen Quins	Eirias Stadium
10 December	Merthyr RFC	24 - 40	Newport RFC	The Wern

=== Week 11 ===
Numerous matches postponed due to weather

Date	Home team	Score	Away team	Venue
15 December	Llandovery RFC	P - P	Aberavon RFC	–
17 December	Cardiff RFC	82 – 0	Carmarthen Quins	Cardiff Arms Park
17 December	Bridgend Ravens	P - P	Swansea RFC	–
17 December	Newport RFC	P - P	Llanelli RFC	–
17 December	Ebbw Vale RFC	P - P	Merthyr RFC	–

=== Week 12 ===
Date	Home team	Score	Away team	Venue
26 December	Swansea RFC	34 - 23	Llanelli RFC	St Helen's
26 December	Ebbw Vale RFC	22 - 18	Newport RFC	Eugene Cross Park
26 December	Bridgend Ravens	15 - 18	Aberavon RFC	Talbot Athletic Ground
26 December	Llandovery RFC	29 - 0	Carmarthen Quins	Church Bank Playing Fields
26 December	Cardiff RFC	39 - 13	Pontypridd RFC	Cardiff Arms Park
27 December	RGC 1404	18 - 25	Merthyr RFC	Eirias Stadium

=== Week 13 ===
Date	Home team	Score	Away team	Venue
5 January	Llanelli RFC	26 - 36	Ebbw Vale RFC	Parc y Scarlets
7 January	Merthyr RFC	16 - 22	Cardiff RFC	The Wern
7 January	Pontypridd RFC	12 – 23	Llandovery RFC	Sardis Road
7 January	Aberavon RFC	22 - 8	Swansea RFC	Talbot Athletic Ground
7 January	Newport RFC	20 - 10	RGC 1404	Newport Stadium
7 January	Carmarthen Quins	14 - 22	Bridgend Ravens	Brewery Field

=== Week 14 ===
Date	Home team	Score	Away team	Venue
12 January	Llandovery RFC	16 - 26	Merthyr RFC	Church Bank Playing Fields
14 January	Swansea RFC	33 - 34	Carmarthen Quins	St Helen's
14 January	RGC 1404	26 – 14	Ebbw Vale RFC	Eirias Stadium
14 January	Cardiff RFC	17 - 18	Newport RFC	Cardiff Arms Park
14 January	Bridgend Ravens	18 - 8	Pontypridd RFC	Brewery Field

=== Week 15 ===
Date	Home team	Score	Away team	Venue
21 January	Pontypridd RFC	P – P	Swansea RFC	–
21 January	Ebbw Vale RFC	P – P	Cardiff RFC	–
21 January	Newport RFC	P – P	Llandovery RFC	–
21 January	RGC 1404	25 - 12	Llanelli RFC	Eirias Stadium

=== Week 16 ===
Date	Home team	Score	Away team	Venue
28 January	Bridgend Ravens	27 - 24	Newport RFC	Brewery Field
28 January	Llanelli RFC	28 - 38	Carmarthen Quins	Parc y Scarlets
28 January	Swansea RFC	6 – 31	Merthyr RFC	St Helen's
28 January	Llandovery RFC	20 - 15	Ebbw Vale RFC	Church Bank Playing Fields
28 January	Aberavon RFC	10 - 27	Pontypridd RFC	Talbot Athletic Ground
28 January	Cardiff RFC	30 - 20	RGC 1404	Cardiff Arms Park

=== Week 17 ===
Date	Home team	Score	Away team	Venue
3 February	Ebbw Vale RFC	35 - 3	Llanelli RFC	Eugene Cross Park

=== Week 18 ===
Date	Home team	Score	Away team	Venue
11 February	RGC 1404	36 - 21	Newport RFC	Eirias Stadium
11 February	Llandovery RFC	20 - 19	Pontypridd RFC	Church Bank Playing Fields
11 February	Llanelli RFC	21 – 55	Aberavon RFC	Parc y Scarlets

=== Week 19 ===
Date	Home team	Score	Away team	Venue
16 February	Merthyr RFC	38 - 31	Aberavon RFC	The Wern
18 February	Newport RFC	33 - 24	Swansea RFC	Newport Stadium
18 February	Ebbw Vale RFC	30 – 27	Bridgend Ravens	Eugene Cross Park
18 February	RGC 1404	24 – 25	Llandovery RFC	Eirias Stadium
18 February	Pontypridd RFC	20 – 23	Carmarthen Quins	Sardis Road
19 February	Cardiff RFC	57 – 28	Llanelli RFC	Cardiff Arms Park

=== Week 20 ===
Date	Home team	Score	Away team	Venue
24 February	Carmarthen Quins	28 - 17	Aberavon RFC	Carmarthen Park
24 February	Merthyr RFC	28 - 12	Pontypridd RFC	The Wern
24 February	Bridgend Ravens	45 – 17	Llanelli RFC	Brewery Field

=== Week 21 ===
Date	Home team	Score	Away team	Venue
2 March	Llandovery RFC	37 - 20	Cardiff RFC	Church Bank Playing Fields
4 March	Aberavon RFC	10 - 17	Newport RFC	Talbot Athletic Ground
4 March	Bridgend Ravens	40 – 25	RGC 1404	Brewery Field
4 March	Carmarthen Quins	22 – 41	Merthyr RFC	Carmarthen Park
4 March	Llanelli RFC	P – P	Pontypridd RFC	–
4 March	Swansea RFC	24 – 31	Ebbw Vale RFC	St Helen's

=== Week 22 ===
Date	Home team	Score	Away team	Venue
9 March	Cardiff RFC	23- 18	Bridgend Ravens	Cardiff Arms Park
10 March	Llandovery RFC	16 - 25	Aberavon RFC	Church Bank Playing Fields
10 March	Ebbw Vale RFC	P – P	Merthyr RFC	–
1 March	RGC 1404	142 – 3	Pontypridd RFC	Eirias Stadium

== Play-Offs ==
=== Semi-finals ===
14 May 2023
17:15

Cardiff	21 - 7	Newport

Cardiff Arms Park

14 May 2023
17:15

Llandovery	16 - 13	Merthyr

Church Bank

=== Final ===
21 May 2023
17:15

Cardiff	8 – 24	Llandovery

Arms Park
