= 2023–24 Indigo Group Premiership =

2023–24 Welsh rugby

- Countries: Wales
- Date: 2 September 2023 – 27 April 2024

Official website
- community.wru.wales

The 2023–24 Indigo Group Premiership is the fifth season of the current format of the rugby union competition Welsh Premier Division. It began on 2 September 2023.

For sponsorship reasons, it was known as Indigo Group Premiership.

== Structure ==
The structure reverted to its traditional league format following truncation the previous season. Each team played each other team on a home and away basis for a total of 22 games. League points were awarded as follows – 4 points for a win, 2 for a draw and 0 for a loss. Teams could also earn an additional bonus point by scoring four or more tries in a match and/or losing by less than seven points. The structure saw the top 4 teams compete in an end of season playoff format, 1st v 4th and 2nd v 3rd, with the final taking place at the ground of the highest seed and the winning team being declared champions.

There was no relegation last season following an expansion from 12 to 14 teams for the 2023–24 season. On 28 March 2023, Llanelli RFC declared their intention to withdraw and focus on player development. The league started on 2 September with 13 clubs.

== Teams ==
Locations of the 2023–24 Indigo Group Premiership teams with colour markers to represent the region they belong to:

Blue = Cardiff Rugby
Orange = Dragons
Black = Ospreys
Red = Scarlets

- RGC acts as a de facto club representing North Wales

Team	Coach	Captain	Stadium	Capacity
Aberavon	Jason Hyatt	Joe Tomalin-Reeves	Talbot Athletic Ground	8,000
Bridgend	Steve Jones	Nathan Edwards	Brewery Field	8,000
Cardiff	Steve Law	Morgan Allen	Cardiff Arms Park	12,125
Carmarthen Quins	Craig Evans	Lee Taylor	Carmarthen Park	3,000
Ebbw Vale	Jason Strange	Joe Franchi	Eugene Cross Park	8,000
Llandovery	Euros Evans	Jack Jones	Church Bank	3,000
Merthyr	Rowland Phillips	Craig Locke	The Wern	4,500
Neath			The Gnoll	6,000
Newport	Tyron Morris	Matt O'Brien	Newport Stadium	5,058
Pontypool			Pontypool Park	8,800
Pontypridd	Chris Dicomidis (player-coach)	Kristian Parker	Sardis Road	7,861
RGC 1404	Ceri Jones	Afon Bagshaw	Eirias Stadium	6,080
Swansea	Hugh Gustafson	Tom Sloane	St Helens Ground	4,500
