= 2010–11 Principality Premiership =

Sports tournament

Principality Premiership
- Countries: Wales
- Number of teams: 14
- Champions: Pontypridd RFC (League); Llanelli RFC (Playoffs)
- Promoted: Bridgend RFC (promoted from Swalec League Division One West)
- Relegated: Glamorgan Wanderers (relegated to WRU Division One East/WRU Division One West)

Official website
- www.wru.co.uk/773.php

The 2010–11 Principality Premiership is the sixteenth Principality Premiership season and the seventh under its current format. The season began in August 2010 and ended in May 2011. Fourteen teams played against each other on a home and away basis, with the standard bonus point system determining placement—4 points for a win, 2 for a draw, and separate bonus points for scoring four or more tries in a match and losing by seven points or less.

== British and Irish Cup Qualification ==
In 2009-10 the top six clubs from the 2008-09 season qualified for the new British and Irish Cup competition. A play-off system was added at the end of the season for the top eight sides to qualify for the following season's British and Irish Cup. Only six teams can qualify for this from the eight. These play-offs do not decide the League Championship, as the league leaders at the end of the regular 26 game season will be Champions.

== Play-off News ==
At the start of the 2010-11 season it was announced that the Welsh Premiership title would be settled by a play-off at a neutral ground. At the end of the season, play-offs will involve the second and third placed teams meeting at a neutral venue, with the winners facing the team who finished top after the regular season in the final. Two-other play-off issues are also set to feature at the end of the campaign. The top five teams in the league will win automatic entry into the following season's British and Irish Cup with the sixth and final place decided by a play-off. This will see the teams finishing in 7th and 8th position meeting for the right to play the sixth-placed club.

Promotion from Division 1 is also being revamped from the 2010-11 season with play-offs taking place for this too. The bottom-placed team in the Welsh Premiership will be grouped with the respective division winners in Division 1 East, North and West - provided they meet the Premiership criteria. A draw involving the 14th placed club in the Principality Premiership, winners of SWALEC Division One East and West (those clubs have all passed the Premiership criteria) will be made to determine which clubs play each other in play-off one, the winner of which will play the third team in the play-off final).

The fourteen teams competing consisted of Aberavon RFC, Bedwas RFC, Cardiff RFC, Carmarthen Quins, Cross Keys RFC, Glamorgan Wanderers RFC, Llandovery RFC, Llanelli RFC, Neath RFC, Newport RFC, Pontypool RFC, Pontypridd RFC, Swansea RFC, Tonmawr RFC

== Teams ==
Locations of Premier League teams (2010-11) with colour marker showing which region they belong to)

== Stadiums ==
Team	Stadium	Capacity	City/Area
Aberavon RFC	Talbot Athletic Ground	3,000	Port Talbot, Neath Port Talbot
Bedwas	The Bridge Field	3,000	Bedwas, Caerphilly
Cardiff RFC	The Arms Park	12,500	Cardiff
Carmarthen Quins	Carmarthen Park	3,000	Carmarthen, Carmarthenshire
Cross Keys RFC	Pandy Park	3,000	Crosskeys, Caerphilly
Glamorgan Wanderers RFC	Memorial Ground	3,000	Ely, Cardiff
Llandovery RFC	Church Bank Playing Fields	5,000	Llandovery, Carmarthenshire
Llanelli RFC	Parc y Scarlets	14,870	Llanelli, Carmarthenshire
Neath RFC	The Gnoll	7,500	Neath, Neath Port Talbot
Newport RFC	Rodney Parade	10,500	Newport
Pontypool RFC	Pontypool Park	8,800	Pontypool, Torfaen
Pontypridd RFC	Sardis Road	7,861	Pontypridd, Rhondda Cynon Taf
Swansea RFC	St Helens	4,500	Swansea
Tonmawr RFC	Whitworth Ground	3,000	Tonmawr, Neath Port Talbot

== Table ==
KEY
Champions
Qualified for play-offs
Relegated

	Team	Pld	W	D	L	PF	PA	PD	TF	TA	Try bonus	Losing bonus	Points
1	Pontypridd RFC	26	23	1	2	767	382	385	92	40	11	2	107
2	Neath RFC	26	21	0	5	733	426	307	84	38	12	4	100
3	Llanelli RFC	26	19	0	7	869	486	383	101	60	11	4	91
4	Aberavon RFC	26	17	0	9	804	633	171	90	63	11	4	83
5	Swansea RFC	26	12	1	13	761	470	91	101	81	15	6	72
6	Cross Keys RFC	26	13	1	12	635	543	92	62	56	6	8	68
7	Newport RFC	26	14	1	11	620	657	-37	71	77	6	2	66
8	Tonmawr RFC	26	12	2	12	614	651	-37	65	63	8	5	65
9	Cardiff RFC	26	10	2	14	611	613	-2	65	60	7	8	59
10	Bedwas RFC	26	11	0	15	532	665	-133	52	77	4	6	54
11	Carmarthen Quins RFC	26	9	0	17	518	710	-192	55	79	4	3	43
12	Pontypool RFC	26	7	1	18	584	718	-134	57	78	3	5	38
13	Llandovery RFC	26	6	1	19	511	734	-223	57	88	4	7	37
14	Glamorgan Wanderers RFC	26	3	0	23	489	1067	-578	55	146	5	4	21
Correct as of 2011-05-07

== Fixtures & results ==
=== Week 1 ===
Date	Time	Home team	Score	Away team	Venue
28 August	14:30	Cardiff RFC (1 BP)	61 - 18	Carmarthen Quins RFC	Cardiff Arms Park
28 August	14:30	Glamorgan Wanderers RFC	3 - 52	Neath RFC (1 BP)	Memorial Ground
28 August	14:30	Llandovery RFC	16 - 37	Swansea RFC (1 BP)	Church Bank Playing Fields
28 August	14:30	Newport RFC (1 BP)	40 - 36	Llanelli RFC (1 BP)	Rodney Parade
28 August	14:30	Pontypool RFC	27 - 16	Bedwas RFC	Pontypool Park
28 August	14:30	Pontypridd RFC	23 - 15	Cross Keys RFC	Sardis Road
28 August	14:30	Tonmawr RFC (1 BP)	18 - 19	Aberavon RFC	Whitworth Ground

=== Week 2 ===
Date	Time	Home team	Score	Away team	Venue
4 September	14:30	Aberavon RFC	31 - 26	Pontypool RFC (1 BP)	Talbot Athletic Ground
4 September	14:30	Bedwas RFC	22 - 21	Neath RFC (1 BP)	The Bridge Field
4 September	14:30	Carmarthen Quins RFC	14 - 30	Newport RFC	Carmarthen Park
4 September	14:30	Cross Keys RFC (1 BP)	20 - 21	Cardiff RFC	Pandy Park
4 September	14:30	Glamorgan RFC	15 - 47	Pontypridd RFC (1 BP)	Memorial Ground
4 September	14:30	Llanelli RFC (1 BP)	43 - 10	Llandovery RFC	Parc y Scarlets
4 September	14:30	Swansea RFC (1 BP)	34 - 34	Tonmawr RFC (1 BP)	St Helens

=== Week 3 ===
Date	Time	Home team	Score	Away team	Venue
11 September	14:30	Aberavon RFC	25 - 24	Bedwas RFC (1 BP)	Talbot Athletic Ground
11 September	14:30	Cardiff RFC (1 BP)	23 - 26	Llanelli RFC	Cardiff Arms Park
11 September	14:30	Neath RFC	16 - 9	Cross Keys RFC (1 BP)	The Gnoll
11 September	14:30	Newport RFC	20 - 38	Swansea RFC (1 BP)	Rodney Parade
11 September	14:30	Pontypool RFC (1 BP)	61 - 29	Glamorgan Wanderers (1 BP)	Pontypool Park
11 September	14:30	Pontypridd RFC	20 - 18	Carmarthen Quins RFC (1 BP)	Sardis Road
11 September	14:30	Tonmawr RFC (1 BP)	31 - 7	Llandovery RFC	Whitworth Ground

=== Week 4 ===
Date	Time	Home team	Score	Away team	Venue
18 September	14:30	Aberavon RFC (1 BP)	22-40	Pontypridd RFC (1 BP)	Talbot Athletic Ground
18 September	14:30	Bedwas RFC (1 BP)	35-34	Cardiff RFC (2 BP)	The Bridge Field
18 September	14:30	Carmarthen Quins RFC	23-34	Swansea RFC (1 BP)	Carmarthen Park
18 September	14:30	Cross Keys RFC	23-17	Llandovery RFC (1 BP)	Pandy Park
18 September	14:30	Glamorgan Wanderers RFC (1 BP)	31-39	Newport RFC (1 BP)	Memorial Ground
18 September	14:30	Llanelli RFC (1 BP)	83-32	Tonmawr RFC (1 BP)	Parc y Scarlets
22 September	19:30	Newport RFC (1 BP)	34-10	Carmarthen Quins RFC	Rodney Parade
22 September	14:30	Pontypridd RFC (1 BP)	83-8	Glamorgan Wanderers RFC	Sardis Road

=== Week 5 ===
Date	Time	Home team	Score	Away team	Venue
25 September	14:30	Cardiff RFC (1 BP)	26 - 28	Aberavon RFC	Cardiff Arms Park
25 September	14:30	Llandovery RFC (1 BP)	31 - 7	Glamorgan Wanderers RFC	Church Bank Playing Fields
25 September	14:30	Llanelli RFC (1 BP)	43 - 10	Carmarthen Quins RFC	Parc y Scarlets
25 September	14:30	Newport RFC	17 - 16	Bedwas RFC (1 BP)	Rodney Parade
25 September	14:30	Pontypridd RFC	24 - 13	Pontypool RFC	Sardis Road
25 September	14:30	Swansea RFC (1 BP)	34 - 28	Cross Keys RFC (2 BP)	St Helens
25 September	14:30	Tonmawr RFC (1 BP)	16 - 23	Neath RFC	Whitworth Ground

=== Week 6 ===
Date	Time	Home team	Score	Away team	Venue
2 October	14:30	Aberavon RFC (1 BP)	41 - 25	Newport RFC	Talbot Athletic Ground
2 October	14:30	Bedwas RFC	18 - 15	Llandovery RFC (1 BP)	The Bridge Field
2 October	14:30	Carmarthen Quins RFC	29 - 28	Tonmawr RFC (1 BP)	Carmarthen Park
2 October	14:30	Cross Keys RFC	27 - 19	Llanelli RFC	Pandy Park
2 October	14:30	Glamorgan Wanderers RFC	24 - 49	Swansea RFC (1 BP)	Memorial Ground
2 October	14:30	Neath RFC	16 - 13	Pontypridd RFC (1 BP)	The Gnoll
2 October	14:30	Pontypool RFC	22 - 17	Cardiff RFC (1 BP)	Pontypool Park

=== Week 7 ===
Date	Time	Home team	Score	Away team	Venue
9 October	14:30	Carmarthen Quins RFC	16 - 25	Cross Keys RFC	Carmarthen Park
9 October	14:30	Glamorgan Wanderers RFC	13 - 23	Llanelli RFC	Memorial Ground
9 October	14:30	Llandovery RFC	16 - 34	Aberavon RFC (1 BP)	Church Bank Playing Fields
9 October	14:30	Neath RFC (1 BP)	44 - 10	Cardiff RFC	The Gnoll
9 October	18:05	Newport RFC	20 - 8	Pontypool RFC	Rodney Parade
9 October	14:30	Swansea RFC (1 BP)	48 - 21	Bedwas RFC	St Helens
9 October	14:30	Tonmawr RFC	23 - 38	Pontypridd RFC	Whitworth Ground

=== Week 8 ===
Date	Time	Home team	Score	Away team	Venue
16 October	14:30	Bedwas RFC (1 BP)	36 - 27	Cross Keys RFC (1 BP)	The Bridge Field
16 October	14:30	Carmarthen Quins RFC	19 - 29	Pontypool RFC	Carmarthen Park
16 October	14:30	Glamorgan Wanderers RFC	19 - 42	Tonmawr RFC (1 BP)	Memorial Ground
16 October	14:30	Neath RFC	28 - 21	Aberavon RFC (1 BP)	The Gnoll

=== Week 9 ===
Date	Time	Home team	Score	Away team	Venue
23 October	14:30	Aberavon RFC	27 - 12	Swansea RFC	Talbot Athletic Ground
23 October	14:30	Bedwas RFC	3 - 28	Llanelli RFC (1 BP)	The Bridge Field
23 October	14:30	Cross Keys RFC (1 BP)	28 - 33	Tonmawr RFC (1 BP)	Pandy Park
23 October	14:30	Glamorgan Wanderers RFC	24 - 10	Carmarthen Quins RFC	Memorial Ground
23 October	14:30	Pontypool RFC	26 - 26	Llandovery RFC	Pontypool Park
23 October	14:30	Pontypridd RFC	16 - 16	Cardiff RFC	Sardis Road
24 October	14:30	Newport RFC	12 - 31	Neath RFC (1 BP)	Rodney Parade

=== Week 10 ===
Date	Time	Home team	Score	Away team	Venue
30 October	14:30	Carmarthen Quins RFC	17 - 10	Bedwas RFC (1 BP)	Carmarthen Park
30 October	14:30	Cross Keys RFC (1 BP)	59 - 20	Glamorgan Wanderers	Pandy Park
30 October	14:30	Llandovery RFC	21 - 34	Neath RFC (1 BP)	Church Bank Playing Fields
30 October	14:30	Llanelli RFC	28 - 18	Aberavon RFC	Parc y Scarlets
30 October	14:30	Newport RFC (1 BP)	18 - 23	Pontypridd RFC	Rodney Parade
30 October	14:30	Swansea RFC (1 BP)	41 - 14	Pontypool RFC	St Helens
30 October	14:30	Tonmawr RFC	30 - 30	Cardiff RFC	Whitworth Ground

=== Week 11 ===
Date	Time	Home team	Score	Away team	Venue
2 November	19:15	Neath RFC (1 BP)	33 - 7	Carmarthen Quins	The Gnoll
5 November	19:15	Cardiff RFC	15 - 11	Swansea RFC (1 BP)	Cardiff Arms Park
5 November	19:30	Pontypridd RFC	19 - 14	Llanelli RFC (1 BP)	Sardis Road
5 November	19:30	Tonmawr RFC	9 - 17	Bedwas RFC	Whitworth Ground
6 November	11:30	Newport RFC	11 - 21	Llandovery RFC	Rodney Parade

=== Week 12 ===
Date	Time	Home team	Score	Away team	Venue
9 November	19:15	Aberavon RFC (1 BP)	34 - 14	Llandovery RFC	Talbot Athletic Ground
9 November	19:30	Bedwas RFC (1 BP)	29 - 25	Swansea RFC (2 BP)	The Bridge Field
9 November	19:15	Cardiff RFC (1 BP)	13 - 20	Neath RFC	Cardiff Arms Park
9 November	19:15	Cross Keys RFC (1 BP)	11 - 16	Carmarthen Quins RFC	Pandy Park
9 November	19:30	Llanelli RFC (1 BP)	58 - 26	Glamorgan Wanderers RFC (1 BP)	Parc y Scarlets
9 November	19:15	Pontypool RFC (1 BP)	15 - 22	Newport RFC	Pontypool Park
9 November	19:15	Pontypridd RFC	31 - 8	Tonmawr RFC	Sardis Road

=== Week 13 ===
Date	Time	Home team	Score	Away team	Venue
13 November	11:00	Swansea RFC (1 BP)	28 - 39	Pontypridd RFC (1 BP)	St Helens
13 November	11:30	Llandovery RFC (1 BP)	21 - 24	Cardiff RFC	Church Bank Playing Fields
14 November	14:30	Aberavon RFC (1 BP)	56 - 16	Glamorgan Wanderers RFC	Talbot Athletic Ground
14 November	14:30	Tonmawr RFC	19 - 12	Newport RFC (1 BP)	Whitworth Ground
15 November	19:15	Llanelli RFC	19 - 12	Neath RFC (1 BP)	Parc y Scarlets

=== Week 14 ===
Date	Time	Home team	Score	Away team	Venue
20 November	14:30	Bedwas RFC	22 - 10	Glamorgan Wanderers RFC	The Bridge Field
20 November	14:30	Cardiff RFC	25 - 34	Cross Keys RFC (1 BP)	Cardiff Arms Park
20 November	14:30	Neath RFC	26 - 25	Llandovery RFC (1 BP)	The Gnoll
20 November	14:30	Pontypool RFC	15 - 38	Swansea (1 BP)	Pontypool Park
20 November	14:30	Pontypridd RFC (1 BP)	28 - 15	Newport RFC	Sardis Road
20 November	14:30	Tonmawr RFC	24 - 12	Carmarthen Quins RFC	Whitworth Ground

=== Week 15 ===
All games postponed due to the weather.

=== Week 16 ===
Date	Time	Home team	Score	Away team	Venue
4 December	14:30	Llanelli RFC	32 - 16	Cardiff RFC	Parc y Scarlets

=== Week 17 ===
Date	Time	Home team	Score	Away team	Venue
11 December	14:30	Aberavon RFC	18 - 29	Tonmawr RFC	Talbot Athletic Ground

=== Week 18 ===
All games postponed due to the weather.

=== Week 19 ===
Date	Time	Home team	Score	Away team	Venue
27 December	14:30	Llanelli RFC	40 - 27	Swansea RFC (1 BP)	Parc y Scarlets
29 December	19:00	Bedwas RFC	18 - 30	Pontypridd	Bridge Field
30 December	19:15	Cardiff RFC (1 BP)	29 - 23	Glamorgan Wanderers RFC (1 BP)	Cardiff Arms Park

=== Week 20 ===
Date	Time	Home team	Score	Away team	Venue
2 January	14:30	Tonmawr RFC	7 - 26	Llanelli RFC	Whitworth Ground
3 January	14:30	Cardiff RFC (1 BP)	21 - 22	Bedwas RFC	Cardiff Arms Park
3 January	14:30	Llandovery RFC (1 BP)	18 - 25	Cross Keys RFC	Church Bank Playing Fields
3 January	14:30	Neath RFC (1 BP)	43 - 18	Pontypool RFC	The Gnoll
3 January	14:30	Newport RFC	26 - 20	Glamorgan Wanderers RFC (1 BP)	Rodney Parade
3 January	17:15	Pontypridd RFC	32 - 21	Aberavon RFC	Sardis Road
3 January	14:30	Swansea RFC (1 BP)	46 - 19	Carmarthen Quins RFC	St Helens

=== Week 21 ===
Date	Time	Home team	Score	Away team	
8 January	14:30	Aberavon RFC	27 - 14	Cardiff RFC	Talbot Athletic Ground
8 January	14:30	Bedwas RFC (1 BP)	25 - 28	Newport RFC	The Bridge Field
8 January	14:30	Carmarthen Quins (1 BP)	11 - 15	Llanelli RFC	Carmarthen Park
8 January	14:30	Cross Keys	21 - 16	Swansea RFC (1 BP)	Pandy Park
8 January	14:30	Glamorgan Wanderers RFC (1 BP)	41 - 33	Llandovery RFC (1 BP)	Memorial Ground
8 January	14:30	Neath RFC	19 - 10	Tonmawr RFC	The Gnoll

=== Week 22 ===
Date	Time	Home team	Score	Away team	Venue
15 January	14:30	Bedwas RFC	6 - 20	Aberavon RFC	The Bridge Field
18 January	19:15	Cardiff RFC	24 - 12	Pontypool RFC	Cardiff Arms Park

=== Week 23 ===
All games postponed due to frozen pitches.

=== Week 24 ===
All games postponed due to some Swalec cup matches being replayed.

=== Week 25 ===
Date	Time	Home team	Score	Away team	Venue
12 February	13:00	Pontypool RFC	27 - 11	Carmarthen Quins RFC	Pontypool Park
12 February	13:00	Swansea RFC	27 - 18	Newport RFC	St Helens
12 February	13:30	Glamorgan Wanderers RFC	8 - 24	Cross Keys RFC	Memorial Ground
12 February	14:00	Aberavon RFC (1 BP)	59 - 15	Llanelli RFC	Talbot Athletic Ground
12 February	14:00	Neath RFC (1 BP)	49 - 18	Bedwas RFC	The Gnoll
15 February	19:15	Carmarthen Quins RFC	6 - 3	Pontypridd RFC (1 BP)	Carmarthen Park
16 February	19:15	Glamorgan Wanderers RFC	13 - 29	Cardiff RFC (1 BP)	Memorial Ground

=== Week 26 ===
Date	Time	Home team	Score	Away team	Venue
23 February	19:15	Glamorgan Wanderers RFC	14 - 12	Pontypool RFC (1 BP)	Memorial Ground
26 February	11:30	Carmarthen Quins RFC (1 BP)	34 - 7	Llandovery RFC	Carmarthen Park
26 February	11:30	Newport RFC	24 - 10	Cross Keys	Rodney Parade
26 February	12:00	Cardiff RFC	11 - 7	Tonmawr RFC (1 BP)	Cardiff Arms Park
26 February	12:00	Pontypridd RFC	24 - 10	Bedwas RFC	Sardis Road
1 March	19:15	Pontypool RFC	3 - 25	Neath RFC (1 BP)	Pontypool Park

=== Week 27 ===
Date	Time	Home team	Score	Away team	Venue
5 March	14:30	Aberavon RFC (1 BP)	46 - 40	Carmarthen Quins RFC (2 BP)	Talbot Athletic Ground
5 March	14:30	Bedwas RFC	32 - 19	Pontypool RFC	Bridge Field
5 March	14:30	Cross Keys RFC	23 - 23	Newport RFC	Pandy Park
5 March	14:30	Neath RFC (1 BP)	41 - 35	Glamorgan Wanderers RFC (2 BP)	The Gnoll
5 March	14:30	Tonmawr RFC	26 - 22	Swansea RFC (1 BP)	Whitworth Ground

=== Week 28 ===
Date	Time	Home team	Score	Away team	Venue
8 March	19:30	Llandovery RFC (1 BP)	23 - 26	Llanelli RFC	Church Bank Playing Fields
10 March	19:30	Pontypridd RFC	28 - 8	Neath RFC	Sardis Road
11 March	19:15	Pontypool RFC	18 - 16	Cross Keys RFC (1 BP)	Pontypool Park
11 March	19:30	Swansea RFC (1 BP)	18 - 19	Llandovery RFC	St Helens
12 March	13:30	Carmarthen Quins RFC (1 BP)	50 - 25	Glamorgan Wanderers RFC	Carmarthen Park
13 March	14:30	Llanelli RFC (1 BP)	33 - 25	Newport RFC	Parc y Scarlets
15 March	19:15	Pontypool RFC	18 - 29	Pontypridd RFC (1 BP)	Pontypool Park

=== Week 29 ===
Date	Time	Home team	Score	Away team	Venue
19 March	14:30	Bedwas RFC (1 BP)	21 - 26	Carmarthen Quins RFC	The Bridge Field
19 March	14:30	Cardiff RFC (1 BP)	42 - 16	Newport RFC	Cardiff Arms Park
19 March	14:30	Cross Keys RFC (1 BP)	41 - 10	Aberavon RFC	Pandy Park
19 March	19:15-19:30	Neath RFC (1 BP)	35 - 15	Swansea RFC	The Gnoll
19 March	14:30	Pontypool RFC (1 BP)	46 - 40	Llanelli RFC (2 BP)	Pontypool Park
19 March	14:30	Pontypridd RFC (1 BP)	41 - 3	Llandovery RFC	Sardis Road
22 March	19:15	Cross Keys RFC (1 BP)	17 - 21	Neath RFC	Pandy Park
22 March	19:15	Llandovery RFC	26 - 16	Pontypool RFC	Church Bank Playing Fields
22 March	19:15	Swansea RFC (1 BP)	57 - 7	Glamorgan Wanderers RFC	St Helens
23 March	19:15	Cardiff RFC	6 - 20	Pontypridd RFC	Cardiff Arms Park
24 March	19:30	Llanelli RFC (1 BP)	32 - 7	Bedwas RFC	Parc y Scarlets
29 March	19:15	Cross Keys RFC (1 BP)	15 - 19	Pontypridd RFC	Pandy Park
29 March	19:15	Neath RFC (1 BP)	35 - 12	Newport RFC	The Gnoll
29 March	19:15	Swansea RFC	7 - 34	Llanelli RFC (1 BP)	St Helens
30 March	19:15	Carmarthen Quins RFC	11 - 23	Aberavon RFC	Carmarthen Park
30 March	19:15	Tonmawr RFC (1 BP)	37 - 25	Pontypool RFC	Whitworth Ground

=== Week 30 ===
Date	Time	Home team	Score	Away team	Venue
2 April	14:30	Aberavon RFC (1 BP)	21 - 25	Cross Keys RFC	Talbot Athletic Ground
2 April	14:30	Cardiff RFC (1 BP)	25 - 26	Llandovery RFC (1 BP)	Cardiff Arms Park
2 April	14:30	Glamorgan Wanderers RFC (1 BP)	30 - 36	Bedwas RFC (1 BP)	Memorial Ground
2 April	14:30	Neath RFC	37 - 28	Llanelli RFC	The Gnoll
2 April	14:30	Newport RFC (1 BP)	35 - 31	Tonmawr RFC (1 BP)	Rodney Parade
2 April	14:30	Pontypridd RFC (1 BP)	34 - 7	Swansea RFC	Sardis Road
5 April	19:30	Carmarthen Quins RFC	29 - 22	Cardiff RFC (1 BP)	Carmarthen Park
5 April	19:30	Llandovery RFC (1 BP)	24 - 28	Tonmawr RFC	Church Bank
9 April	14:30	Cross Keys RFC (1 BP)	46 - 15	Bedwas RFC	Pandy Park
9 April	14:30	Llanelli RFC (1 BP)	47 - 45	Pontypool RFC (2 BP)	Parc y Scarlets
9 April	14:30	Newport RFC	27 - 21	Cardiff RFC (1 BP)	Rodney Parade

=== Week 31 ===
Date	Time	Home team	Score	Away team	Venue
12 April	19:15	Llandovery RFC	10 - 32	Bedwas RFC	Church Bank Playing Fields
12 April	19:15	Pontypool RFC	29 - 38	Aberavon RFC (1 BP)	Pontypool Park
12 April	19:15	Swansea RFC	10 - 32	Neath RFC (1 BP)	St Helens
13 April	19:15	Tonmawr RFC	23 - 9	Glamorgan Wanderers RFC	Whitworth Ground
14 April	17:15	Llanelli RFC (1 BP)	25 - 30	Pontypridd RFC (1 BP)	Parc y Scarlets
16 April	14:30	Bedwas RFC (1 BP)	21 - 28	Tonmawr RFC	The Bridge Field
16 April	14:30	Carmarthen Quins RFC	24 - 22	Neath RFC (1 BP)	Carmarthen Park
16 April	14:30	Cross Keys RFC	22 - 10	Pontypool RFC	Pandy Park
16 April	14:30	Glamorgan Wanderers RFC	19 - 75	Aberavon RFC (1 BP)	Memorial Ground
16 April	14:30	Llandovery RFC	18 - 29	Newport RFC (1 BP)	Rodney Parade
16 April	14:30	Swansea RFC (2 BP)	34 - 36	Cardiff RFC (1 BP)	St Helens
19 April	19:45	Llandovery RFC	17 - 33	Pontypridd RFC (1 BP)	Church Bank Playing Fields
19 April	19:15	Swansea RFC (1 BP)	46 - 44	Aberavon RFC (2 BP)	St Helens
19 April	19:15	Tonmawr RFC	7 - 31	Cross Keys RFC	Whitworth Ground

=== Week 32 ===
Date	Time	Home team	Score	Away team	Venue
23 April	14:30	Llandovery RFC (1 BP)	47 - 38	Carmarthen Quins (1 BP)	Church Bank Playing Fields
23 April	14:30	Llanelli RFC (1 BP)	57 - 13	Cross Keys RFC	Parc y Scarlets
23 April	14:30	Newport RFC (1 BP)	42 - 41	Aberavon RFC (2 BP)	Rodney Parade
23 April	14:30	Pontypool RFC (1 BP)	28 - 34	Tonmawr RFC (1 BP)	Pontypool Park
25 April	14:30	Aberavon RFC	15 - 11	Neath RFC (1 BP)	Talbot Athletic Ground

== Relegation/Promotion play-offs ==
=== Play-off One ===
30 April 2011
6:30pm

Glamorgan Wanderers RFC	16 - 13	Ebbw Vale RFC

Cardiff Arms Park

Glamorgan play Bridgend in the final to see who will be playing Premiership Rugby next season and who will be in Division 1.

=== Relegation/Promotion play-off Final ===
7 May 2011
6:30pm

Glamorgan Wanderers	19 - 36	Bridgend RFC

Cardiff Arms Park

Bridgend are promoted to the Premiership while Glamorgan are relegated

== British and Irish Cup play-offs ==
=== Sixth place British and Irish Cup Qualification play-offs ===
7 May 2011
2:30pm

Newport RFC	31 - 5	Tonmawr RFC

Rodney Parade
Referee: Tim Hayes

Newport travel to Cross Keys with the winners taking the final place in next season's British and Irish Cup competition

=== Sixth place British and Irish Cup Qualification play-off Final ===
12 May 2011
7:15pm

Cross Keys RFC	25 - 18	Newport RFC

Pandy Park
Referee: Wayne Davies

Cross Keys qualify for the final place in next season's British and Irish Cup

== Principality Premiership Champions play-offs ==
=== Principality Premiership Semi-Final play-offs ===
12 May 2011
7:35pm

Neath RFC	5 - 46	Llanelli RFC

The Gnoll

Llanelli play Pontypridd who ended the regular season as league leaders to see who are the Champions

=== Principality Premiership play-off Final ===
19 May 2011
7:35pm

Pontypridd RFC	18 - 24	Llanelli RFC

Sardis Road
Referee: Dave Jones

Llanelli are the Principality Premiership Champions
