= 1998–99 Welsh Premier Division =

Rugby union competition for Welsh clubs

- Countries: Wales
- Champions: (Wales) Llanelli RFC
- Runners-up: (Wales) Pontypridd RFC
- Matches played: 80

The 1998–99 Welsh Premier Division was a rugby union competition for Welsh clubs. It was not contested by Cardiff and Swansea, due to their ongoing dispute with the WRU. Newport and Aberavon were promoted to take their place. Llanelli RFC won the league, despite Pontypridd RFC beginning the season as runaway favourites. Llanelli, Pontypridd, and Neath RFC qualified for the 1999–2000 Heineken Cup, with Ebbw Vale RFC missing out to make space for Cardiff and Swansea. Aberavon RFC were relegated.

The league operated under a round-robin, with each team playing the seven others home and away. The top and bottom four then separated for the second phase, again playing each other home and away to add an extra six games to the season.

== Table ==
Team	P	W	D	L	PF	PA	+/−	Pts
(Wales) Llanelli RFC	20	15	1	4	768	341	+427	64
(Wales) Pontypridd RFC	20	12	0	8	646	468	+178	46
(Wales) Neath RFC	20	12	0	8	568	491	+77	44
(Wales) Ebbw Vale RFC	20	12	1	7	541	468	+73	44
(Wales) Caerphilly RFC	20	10	2	8	550	562	-12	37
(Wales) Bridgend RFC	20	9	2	9	522	607	-85	36
(Wales) Newport RFC	20	5	0	15	499	639	-140	23
(Wales) Aberavon RFC	20	2	0	18	394	929	-535	10

== Results ==
=== First phase ===
==== Round 3 ====
9 September 1998

Bridgend RFC	24–52	Pontypridd RFC

==== Round 4 ====
4 October 1998

Ebbw Vale RFC	24–23	Pontypridd RFC

4 October 1998

Llanelli RFC	68–26	Newport RFC

==== Round 5 ====
30 November 1998

Pontypridd RFC	44–7	Neath RFC

30 November 1998

Aberavon RFC	12–48	Llanelli RFC

==== Round 6 ====
2 December 1998

Ebbw Vale RFC	24–20	Llanelli RFC

2 December 1998

Pontypridd RFC	55–15	Caerphilly RFC

==== Round 7 ====
5 December 1998

Llanelli RFC	24–16	Pontypridd RFC

==== Round 13 ====
4 April 1999

Neath RFC	53–31	Pontypridd RFC

4 April 1999

Llanelli RFC	83–10	Aberavon RFC

=== Top four playoff ===
==== Round 16 ====
25 April 1999

Neath RFC	33–21	Pontypridd RFC

==== Round 19 ====
4 May 1999

Llanelli RFC	23–23	Ebbw Vale RFC

4 May 1999

Pontypridd RFC	14–21	Neath RFC
