= 1998–99 Welsh rugby union rebel season =

Breakaway rugby union season

The 1998–99 rebel season in rugby union occurred when two clubs affiliated to the Welsh Rugby Union (WRU), Cardiff RFC and Swansea RFC, refused to play in the WRU-sanctioned Welsh Premier Division that season and instead opted to play friendly matches against clubs from the English Premiership. The two clubs' position came about after the WRU rejected requests by the club to pursue changes to the league structure in Welsh club rugby and in particular to set up a cross-border league involving other clubs in Britain, and the two clubs refused to sign up to a loyalty agreement with the WRU committing them to the current league setup.

The two clubs were removed from Wales' entry into the 1998–99 Heineken Cup and would later be fined £150,000 each by the WRU for three breaches of their regulations. The English Rugby Football Union (RFU) didn't sanction the rebel games, but were accused by rugby union's world governing body, the International Rugby Board (IRB), of not doing enough to prevent the fixtures taking place and had £60,000 of IRB funding withdrawn.

At the end of the season, an agreement was reached between the two clubs and the Welsh Rugby Union that allowed for their return to the Welsh Premier Division, with clauses that would allow them to leave the Welsh league and join the English Premiership in the event a cross-border British league was not set-up by the 2000–01 season. Despite this league not coming to fruition, the two clubs did not exercise their right to leave and remained in the Welsh structure.

== Background ==
Cardiff RFC and Swansea RFC had both been members of the Welsh Premier Division since the formation of the league system in Wales in September 1990. Informal talks had taken place around an Anglo-Welsh league, containing Cardiff, Swansea, Neath and Llanelli, as early as 1993, with the public support of then-Wales coach Alan Davies. In August 1995, rugby union became a professional game, which allowed payment or benefits to be made to players. Following the change to professionalism, several of the clubs playing in the Premier Division began experiencing financial difficulties. Llanelli RFC sold their ground, Stradey Park, to the WRU in 1997 to raise money, Neath RFC were taken over by a WRU-owned subsidiary Gower Park Ltd. in May 1998. Pontypridd RFC and Bridgend RFC were also in financial difficulties.

Against this backdrop, the WRU wished to have clubs in the Premier Division sign 10-year loyalty agreements. These four page agreements would see the clubs assured of their places in the top-flight of the league system for the duration of the agreement, in exchange for their commitment to remain playing in the league system. However, both Swansea and Cardiff saw insufficient returns available from the Welsh league, and refused to sign up to the loyalty agreements, instead suggesting the setup of a British league involving four clubs from Wales, the clubs that comprised the top division in England and two Scottish regional sides; Edinburgh and Glasgow. This proposal was supported by both the English Rugby Football Union (RFU) and the clubs that comprised the top two divisions in England, but was rejected by the WRU, owing to ongoing legal action between the RFU and English clubs over commercial rights, and the ongoing legal action taken by Cardiff. The WRU reiterated their requirement that Cardiff and Swansea sign up to the loyalty agreement in order to continue participating in the Premier Division and the European Cup.

== Confirmation of Breakaway ==
Eight days before the 1998–99 Premier Division was due to start, Swansea and Cardiff released a statement that confirmed their position that they would play friendly matches against English clubs rather than participate in the Welsh Premier Division. The two clubs had organised to play each of the 14 teams of the English Premiership on a home and away basis, with the matches scheduled alongside the Premiership so that each weekend of the season, 12 of the English clubs played league matches while two clubs would have a free weekend in the league to allow them to play the two Welsh clubs. The two clubs sold the television coverage rights to the matches themselves, with the BBC acquiring the rights. By contrast, the rights to cover the Premier Division fixtures were held by HTV and S4C.

At a general committee meeting held on 24 August; the WRU formally acknowledged their withdrawal from the Premier Division and replaced them. Cardiff's position was given to Newport RFC, who had been relegated at the end of the 1997–98 season and Swansea's to Aberavon RFC, who had finished second in Division One, the tier below the Premier Division. The WRU confirmed their position that any matches Cardiff and Swansea played against opponents from England would not be sanctioned. The RFU also refused to sanction the friendly matches, which meant neither union would provide match officials for the games, resulting in retired and junior officials being called upon for these games.

== Rebel games ==
Initially, the friendly games were contested as promised between full-strength teams. Cardiff's first home fixture came against Saracens, with over 10,000 fans attending Cardiff Arms Park to watch Cardiff defeat Saracens by 40–19. The quality of opposition continued to remain high until the end of the year, however as the season progressed into 1999, the demands of the Premiership season combined with the loss of players to international callups during the 1999 Five Nations tournament led to reduced strength sides being fielded by some Premiership clubs, and blowout scores being recorded as a result, including Cardiff beating a development Richmond side by 96–28 in May. By comparison, Richmond had won the December encounter between the two sides 35–28.

In December 1998, the WRU announced it would be fining Cardiff and Swansea a total of £150,000 each for several breaches of their regulations. The regulations breached were playing in unsanctioned matches, negotiating their own television contracts and playing in matches with unapproved officials, with the first two offences carrying fines of £60,000 and the third resulting in a £30,000 fine. The WRU imposed a deadline of the end of February to pay the fines by, however both clubs announced they would refuse to pay. Despite not formally sanctioning the games, the English RFU were accused by the governing body of rugby union, the International Rugby Board (IRB) of not doing enough to prevent the fixtures from taking place. A day after the WRU had fined the two Welsh clubs, the IRB announced that the RFU would miss out on £60,000 of funding that they were due to receive from the IRB Trust, effectively imposing a fine on the union for not taking action.

Despite not competing in either the Welsh Premier Division or in the European Cup, both Cardiff and Swansea participated in the WRU organised Challenge Cup competition, which at the time was branded under the name of its sponsor Swalec. Cardiff chief executive Gareth Davies believed that the reason for their inclusion was to appease the sponsor who might otherwise had withdrawn their backing. This competition saw them compete against other Welsh clubs, and as such, the games took on increased importance as Cardiff and Swansea tried to justify their improved standard following cross-border competition as compared to the clubs that had remained in the Welsh league system. Both teams reached the semi-finals where Cardiff were drawn against Llanelli RFC and Swansea against Cross Keys RFC. In the week prior to the game, Cardiff chairman Peter Thomas spoke to the players following a training session, where he emphasised the importance of winning the game, describing it as "the biggest game in the club's history". Cardiff went on to lose the game. In the other semi-final Swansea recorded a convincing win over Cross Keys. Swansea then beat Llanelli in the final to win the cup.

== Reconciliation ==
An emergency meeting was held by the WRU in May 1999, at which the two sides came to an agreement that would see Cardiff and Swansea return to the Welsh Premier Division for the 1999–2000 season, with an agreement that both sides could join the English Premiership for the 2000–01 season in the event that a British league had not been set up. Also as part of the agreement, Cardiff and Swansea signed loyalty agreements with the WRU scheduled to run for the remaining eight years and were also nominated as two of the Welsh representatives in the 1999-2000 European Cup, despite the positions usually being awarded based upon Welsh Premier Division league positions. Cardiff and Swansea's inclusion came at the expense of Ebbw Vale RFC, who would normally have been nominated based on their 1998–99 league position.

== Legacy ==
A British league wasn't set up for the 2000–01 season, however neither Cardiff nor Swansea entered the English Premiership. The two Scottish District sides joined the Welsh sides in forming a Welsh-Scottish League from the 1999 - 2000 season. For the 2001–02 season, the Celtic League ran alongside the 2001-02 Welsh-Scottish League, involving sides from Wales, Scotland and Ireland in a pool/knockout format competition. The 10 year loyalty agreements, which was scheduled to run through to August 2007 were torn up by the WRU in 2003 to allow introduction of regional rugby. With the creation of the five regional teams from Wales, the Celtic League was changed into a traditional double round-robin league.
