= Welsh Rugby Union Premiership =

Welsh rugby union league

Admiral Premiership
- Current season, competition or edition: 2025–26 Welsh Rugby Union Premiership
- Sport: Rugby union
- Founded: 1990
- No. of teams: 13
- Country: Wales
- Most recent champion: Merthyr RFC
- Most titles: Neath (7 Titles)
- Broadcasters: BBC Wales, S4C
- Level on pyramid: 1
- Relegation to: Welsh Championship
- Domestic cup: WRU Challenge Cup

The Welsh Rugby Union Premiership, known as the Admiral Premiership for sponsorship reasons, is a rugby union league in Wales first implemented by the Welsh Rugby Union (WRU) for the 1990–91 season. There have been a number of title sponsors for the league since its inception but, in 2023 the sponsor changed to Admiral Group. The Premiership is the third tier of Welsh rugby union and the highest ranked division in the community game.

== 2025–26 season ==
The teams are feeder clubs for the following regions: Blue = Cardiff Rugby, Orange = Dragons, Black = Ospreys, Red = Scarlets.

=== Clubs and locations ===
Club	Stadium	Capacity	Area	Previous season
Bargoed RFC	Bargoed Park		Bargoed	4th Premiership
Beddau RFC	Castellau Road		Beddau	1st Championship East (Promoted)
Brecon RFC	The Watton		Brecon	5th Premiership
Cardiff Met RFC	Cyncoed Campus		Cardiff	9th Premiership
Cross Keys RFC	Pandy Park		Crosskeys	6th Premiership
Llanelli Wanderers RFC	Stradey Park Avenue		Llanelli	1st Championship West (Promoted)
Llangennech RFC	Llangennech Main Field		Llangennech	7th Premiership
Merthyr RFC	The Wern		Merthyr	1st Premiership (Champions)
Narberth RFC	Spring Gardens		Narberth	11th Premiership
Neath RFC	The Gnoll		Neath	3rd Premiership
Newbridge RFC	The Welfare Ground		Newbridge	10th Premiership
Pontypridd RFC	Sardis Road		Pontypridd	2nd Premiership
Ystrad Rhondda RFC	Gelligaled Road		Rhondda	8th Premiership

Locations of the 2025-26 Indigo Group Premiership teams with colour markers to represent the region they belong to:

Blue = Cardiff Rugby
Orange = Dragons
Black = Ospreys

Red = Scarlets

=== Table ===
POS	TEAM	PL	W	D	L	PF	PA	DIFF	TF	TA	TB	LB	PTS
1	Bargoed RFC	0	0	0	0	0	0	0	0	0	0	0	0
2	Beddau RFC	0	0	0	0	0	0	0	0	0	0	0	0
3	Brecon RFC	0	0	0	0	0	0	0	0	0	0	0	0
4	Cardiff Met RFC	0	0	0	0	0	0	0	0	0	0	0	0
5	Cross Keys RFC	0	0	0	0	0	0	0	0	0	0	0	0
6	Llanelli Wanderers RFC	0	0	0	0	0	0	0	0	0	0	0	0
7	Llangennech RFC	0	0	0	0	0	0	0	0	0	0	0	0
8	Merthyr RFC	0	0	0	0	0	0	0	0	0	0	0	0
9	Narberth RFC	0	0	0	0	0	0	0	0	0	0	0	0
10	Neath RFC	0	0	0	0	0	0	0	0	0	0	0	0
11	Newbridge RFC	0	0	0	0	0	0	0	0	0	0	0	0
12	Pontypridd RFC	0	0	0	0	0	0	0	0	0	0	0	0
13	Ystrad Rhondda RFC	0	0	0	0	0	0	0	0	0	0	0	0

== 2024–25 season ==
The 2024–25 Welsh Premier Division saw a much changed lineup after losing the vast majority of the teams from 2023–24 to the newly formed Super Rygbi Cymru. Merthyr won the title with 108 points.

The teams are feeder clubs for the following regions: Blue = Cardiff Rugby, Orange = Dragons, Black = Ospreys, Red = Scarlets.

=== Table ===
POS	TEAM	PL	W	D	L	PF	PA	DIFF	TF	TA	TB	LB	PTS
1	Merthyr	24	21	0	3	1217	397	820	179	56	21	3	108
2	Pontypridd	24	18	0	6	781	473	308	114	67	16	3	91
3	Neath	24	17	1	6	696	614	82	104	88	15	3	88
4	Bargoed	24	16	1	7	667	506	161	98	71	14	3	83
5	Brecon	24	11	1	12	683	684	-1	94	94	13	4	63
6	Cross Keys	24	12	0	12	601	739	-138	78	106	11	3	62
7	Llangennech	24	11	0	13	627	613	14	90	87	13	4	61
8	Ystrad Rhondda	24	10	2	12	579	771	-192	84	111	111	2	57
9	Cardiff Metropolitan University	24	9	1	14	645	644	1	88	86	10	5	53
10	Newbridge	24	8	1	15	514	656	-142	73	82	9	6	49
11	Narberth	24	7	1	16	501	696	-195	70	102	8	6	44
12	Bonymaen	24	7	0	17	520	742	-222	69	107	8	7	43
13	Newcastle Emlyn	24	4	2	18	478	974	-496	65	149	6	3	29

=== Clubs and locations ===
Club	Stadium	Capacity	Area	Previous season
Bargoed RFC	Bargoed Park		Bargoed	
Bonymaen RFC	Parc Mawr		Bonymaen	
Brecon RFC	The Watton		Brecon	
Cardiff Met RFC	Cyncoed Campus		Cardiff	
Cross Keys RFC	Pandy Park		Crosskeys	
Llangennech RFC	Llangennech Main Field		Llangennech	
Merthyr RFC	The Wern		Merthyr	
Narberth RFC	Spring Gardens		Narberth	
Neath RFC	The Gnoll		Neath	
Newbridge RFC	The Clubhouse		Newbridge	
Newcastle Emlyn RFC	Dol Wiber		Newcastle Emlyn	
Pontypridd RFC	Sardis Road		Pontypridd	
Ystrad Rhondda RFC	Gelligaled Road		Rhondda	

Locations of the 2023–24 Indigo Group Premiership teams with colour markers to represent the region they belong to:

Blue = Cardiff Rugby
Orange = Dragons
Black = Ospreys
Red = Scarlets

- RGC acts as a de facto club representing North Wales

== Competition history ==
Ahead of the 1990–91 season, the Welsh Rugby Union announced that the top 38 clubs would play in the Heineken National League, split into four divisions with the top ten teams forming the Premier League. Each club would play each other home and away in a double round-robin format. The ten teams that were part of the inaugural Premier Division were Abertillery, Cardiff, Bridgend, Glamorgan Wanderers. Llanelli, Neath, Newbridge, Pontypool, Pontypridd and Swansea.

For the 1999–2000, 2000–01 and 2001–02 seasons, it was reformatted as the Welsh-Scottish League with the addition of Edinburgh and Glasgow alongside the Welsh teams; and run jointly by the Scottish Rugby Union and the Welsh Rugby Union.

Originally at the top tier of rugby in Wales, the league lost this status in 2003 with the implementation of the WRU's "Regional Rugby" plan, by which the country would be represented in top-level competitions, i.e. the Celtic League (now URC) and Heineken Cup, by five (now four) regionally based sides. The clubs in the Premier Division became largely developmental sides for the regional teams.

Over succeeding years the league structure was to be changed in order to strengthen the structure of the semi-pro sides feeding the regions. Under the WRU's plan, playing records and facilities will be the main criteria in determining which clubs would stay in the Premiership.

In the 2005–06 season the Welsh Premier Division consisted of 16 clubs. Division One Champions Maesteg and runners-up Glamorgan Wanderers were promoted from Division 1 to join 14 clubs who played Premiership rugby the previous season. The clubs relegated down to Division 1 were Caerphilly, Llanharan and Newbridge, thus, reducing the division from 17 to 16 clubs.

For the 2006–07 season, the Welsh Premier Division was reduced once more to 14 teams. The 2006–07 league was won by Neath RFC, making it three wins in three years.

For the 2007–08 season, a new points system was adopted, following the same system used in the Celtic League, where teams earn four points for a win and two for a draw, and can earn bonus points for either scoring four tries or losing by less than seven points. The relegation rules also changed during the season, stating that if a team failed to meet ground and facility standards during the season, then that club would fall into the final place rather than the club that finished last through points.

British and Irish Cup Qualification

In 2009–10, the top six clubs from the 2008–09 season qualified for the new British and Irish Cup competition. A play-off system was added at the end of the season for the top eight sides to qualify for the following season's British and Irish Cup. Only six teams can qualify for this from the eight. These play-offs do not decide the League Championship, as the league leaders at the end of the regular 26 game season will be Champions.

At the start of the 2010–11 season, it was announced that the Welsh Premiership title would be settled by a play-off at a neutral ground. At the end of the season, play-offs will involve the second and third placed teams meeting at a neutral venue, with the winners facing the team who finished top after the regular season in the final. Two-other play-off issues are also set to feature at the end of the campaign. The top five teams in the league will win automatic entry into the following season's British and Irish Cup with the sixth and final place decided by a play-off. This will see the teams finishing in 7th and 8th position meeting for the right to play the sixth-placed club.

Promotion from Division 1 was revamped from the 2010–11 season with play-offs taking place for this too. The bottom-placed team in the Welsh Premiership was grouped with the respective division winners in Division 1 East, North and West - provided they meet the Premiership criteria.

For the 2012–13 season, it was announced that the Premier Division would be reduced to 10 teams. The teams for the league would be decided on three factors: the holding of an 'A Licence' based on stadium criteria; the signing of a 'Participation Agreement'; and league results over the previous six seasons. It was announced that four clubs, Pontypool, Tonmawr, Bridgend and Carmarthen had not achieved the required criteria to be included into the new league. However, pressure from Ospreys and Scarlets backers led to the league being extended to 12 teams with Bridgend and Carmarthen included. Tonmawr, citing financial reasons, opted not to take part in the new league at all and re-entered themselves into Division Six. Pontypool launched a legal challenge to avoid being the only team relegated but lost the case.

The 2024–25 Welsh Premier Division saw a much-changed lineup after losing the vast majority of the teams from the previous year's competition to the newly formed Super Rygbi Cymru.

== League sponsors ==
Season	Sponsor
2019–2023	The Indigo Group
2023-	Admiral Insurance

== Past Premier Division winners ==
=== Premier Division champions by season ===
==== 1990–2000 ====
Season	Champions
1990–91	Neath
1991–92	Swansea
1992–93	Llanelli
1993–94	Swansea
1994–95	Cardiff
1995–96	Neath
1996–97	Pontypridd
1997–98	Swansea
1998–99	Llanelli
1999–00	Cardiff *

==== 2000–2010 ====
Season	Champions
2000–01	Swansea *
2001–02	Llanelli *
2002–03	Bridgend
2003–04	Newport
2004–05	Neath
2005–06	Neath
2006–07	Neath
2007–08	Neath
2008–09	Cardiff
2009–10	Neath

==== 2010–2020 ====
Season	Champions
2010–11	Llanelli
2011–12	Pontypridd
2012–13	Pontypridd
2013–14	Pontypridd
2014–15	Pontypridd
2015–16	Ebbw Vale
2016–17	Merthyr
2017–18	Merthyr
2018–19	Merthyr
2019–20	Championship withheld

==== 2020–2030 ====
Season	Champions
2020–21	Season cancelled
2021–22	Cardiff
2022–23	Llandovery
2023–24	Llandovery
2024–25	Merthyr
2025–26	
2026–27	
2027–28	
2028–29	
2029–30	

* = Welsh-Scottish League winners

=== Premier Division wins by club ===
Rank	Club	Titles	Years
1	Neath	7	1991, 1996, 2005, 2006, 2007, 2008, 2010
2	Pontypridd	5	1997, 2012, 2013, 2014, 2015
3	Cardiff	4*	1995, 2000, 2009, 2022
3	Llanelli	4	1993, 1999, 2002, 2011
3	Swansea	4	1992, 1994, 1998, 2001
3	Merthyr	4	2017, 2018, 2019, 2025
7	Llandovery	2	2023, 2024
8	Bridgend	1	2003
8	Newport	1	2004
8	Ebbw Vale	1	2016

* = Cardiff RFC were leading the 2019–20 table before the season was cancelled due to the COVID-19 pandemic, but the championship was withheld.

- Current members of the Premiership in Italics

=== WRU pyramid structure ===
Level						
Regions	URC; 4 clubs					
EDC	Super Rygbi Cymru; 10 clubs					
1	WRU Admiral Premiership; 13 clubs					
2	WRU Admiral Championship West; 13 clubs			WRU Admiral Championship East; 13 clubs		
3	Division 1 West; 10 clubs	Division 1 West Central; 10 clubs	Division 1 North; 12 clubs		Division 1 East Central; 10 clubs	Division 1 East; 10 clubs
4	Division 2 West; 10 clubs	Division 2 West Central; 10 clubs	Division 2 North; 10 clubs		Division 2 East Central; 10 clubs	Division 2 East; 10 clubs
5	Division 3 West; 10 clubs	Division 3 West Central; 10 clubs	Division 3 North West; 9 clubs	Division 3 North East; 8 clubs	Division 3 East Central; 10 clubs	Division 3 East; 10 clubs
6	Division 4 West A 9 clubs	Division 4 West B 10 clubs	Division 4 West Central; 10 clubs		Division 4 East Central; 10 clubs	Division 4 East; 10 clubs
7	Division 5 West Central; 10 clubs		Division 5 East Central; 10 clubs		Division 5 East; 9 clubs	
8	Division 6 East Central; 9 clubs			Division 6 East; 8 clubs		

== See also ==
- WRU Challenge Cup
- United Rugby Championship
- British and Irish Cup
- List of Welsh rugby union teams
- WRU National Leagues
