= Maesteg RFC =

Welsh rugby union club, based in Maesteg

(Wales) Maesteg RFC
- Full name: Maesteg Rugby Football Club
- Founded: 1877
- Location: Maesteg, Wales
- Ground: Llynfi Road
- Chairman: Dennis Thomas
- League: WRU Division Three B West Central
- 2021-22: 1st ])
Team kit

Official website
- www.maestegrfc.com

Maesteg Rugby Football Club is a rugby union team from the town of Maesteg, South Wales. The club currently play in the Division 3B west Central Welsh Rugby Union and is a feeder club for the Ospreys.

== Club history ==
Maesteg RFC was formed in 1877 in the Llynfi Valley, in the county of Glamorgan. They were county league champions 1912 to 1913. The 1949 team completed their season without losing a single game. In 1978 and 1979 they were the Whitbread league champions. In 1982 they played the Irish Wolfhounds, Crawshays RFC, Toronto Welsh RFC, German Federation and the New Zealand Māoris; they held the latter to a 10–10 draw. These games were thought at the time to be part of the centenary season of the club. It was later discovered that this was untrue, as the centenary was five years earlier.

Maesteg were promoted to the Welsh Premier Division in 2005, but were relegated back to division one when they came bottom of the league in the 2007/08 season.

== Notable former players ==
See also Category:Maesteg RFC players

The below players have represented Maesteg and have been capped at international level.

- Billy Banks Wales and Great Britain rugby league international
- Allan Bateman Wales international & British Lion
- Gwyn Evans Wales international and British Lion
- Chico Hopkins Wales international and British Lion
- (Wales) Fred Hutchinson
- Trevor Lloyd Wales international and British Lion
- Glyn Moses Wales and Great Britain rugby league international
- (Wales) Charlie Pugh
- Ike Owens Wales & Great Britain rugby league international
- Alan Rees Wales international
- Aaron Rees Wales international
- (Wales) David Watts

== Club honours ==
- Glamorgan Challenge Cup 1912 - Champions
- Whitbread Merit Table 1977/78 - Champions
- Whitbread Merit Table 1978/79 - Champions
- SWALEC Plate 2009/10 - Champions
- WRU Division Two West 2009.10 - Champions
