= Eugene Cross Park =

Sports venue

- EXP
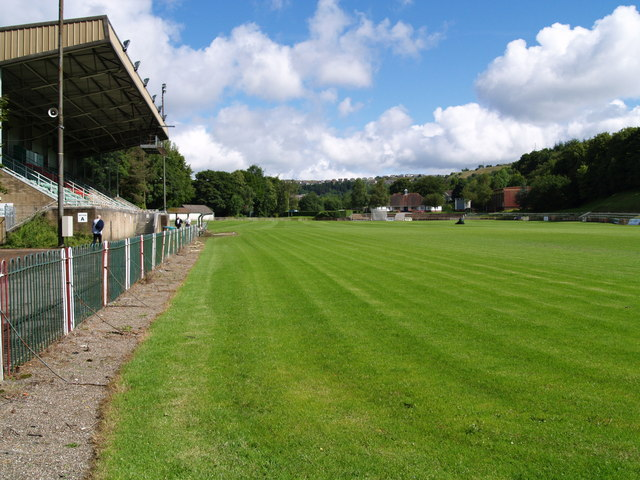
- Interactive map of Eugene Cross Park
- Location: Ebbw Vale RFC, Newchurch Road, Ebbw Vale NP23 5AZ
- Coordinates: 51°47′7″N 3°12′23″W
- Owner: Blaenau Gwent County Borough Council
- Capacity: 8,000

Construction
- Opened: 1919

Tenants
- Ebbw Vale RFC; Ebbw Vale Cricket Club; Glamorgan County Cricket Club; Wales Minor Counties Cricket Club; Ebbw Vale RLFC (1907–1912); Ebbw Vale F.C. (1919–1999)

Eugene Cross Park is a rugby and cricket ground in Ebbw Vale, Wales. In November 1919 the Ebbw Vale Welfare Association was formed and bought the "Bridgend Field". The 6 acres (2.4 ha) of land became known as the Welfare Ground, and in 1973 its name was changed to its present title in honour of Sir Eugene Cross, the influential and long-standing Chairman of the Welfare Trustees. The ground has terraces, a stand which was bought due to a fire which burnt the previous stands and a clubhouse which boasts a pub, a club shop open at match days and award-winning hospitality packages. The stadium is adjacent to the B4486 road, the Newchurch Road and the Ebbw River.

It is the home of Ebbw Vale RFC and Ebbw Vale Cricket Club, it occasionally hosts matches for Glamorgan County Cricket Club, and a small number of international rugby league matches have taken place there. It was also home to Ebbw Vale F.C. for a period when they were members of the League of Wales.

In September 2021 Ciner Group signed a three-year naming rights deal with Ebbw Vale RFC, with the stadium being named the Ciner Glass Community Stadium for the duration of the deal.
