= Talbot Athletic Ground =

Sports stadium in Port Talbot, Wales

Coordinates: 51°35′37.88″N 3°46′33.42″W

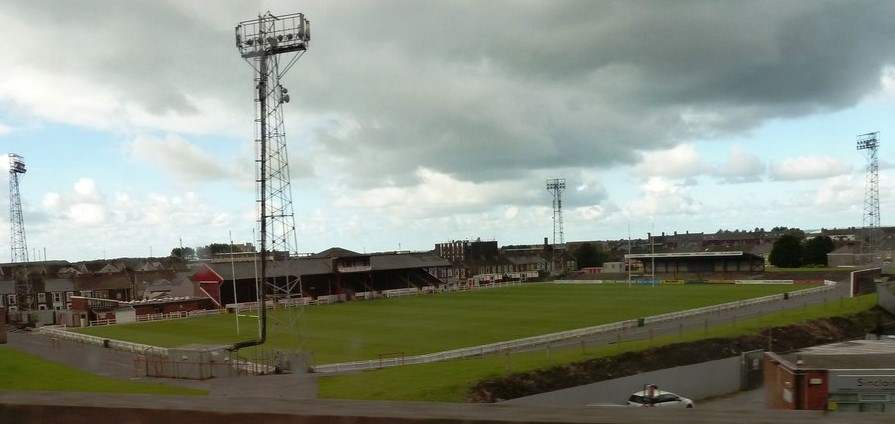
Talbot Athletic Ground

The Talbot Athletic Ground is a sports stadium located in central Port Talbot, Wales, with a maximum capacity of 10,000. The ground is home to Welsh rugby union team Aberavon RFC, and the Wales women's national team.

== History ==
Originally called the Central Athletic Ground in the 1900s, the venue then owned by the Margam Estate played host to various sports including football, tennis, hockey, running, quoits and on one occasion a horse race. Aberavon RFC was granted exclusive use of the ground in 1913 - although it was sectioned off into allotments to help the war effort the following year. Officially re-opened in December 1921, the renamed Talbot Athletic Ground became a barrage balloon site during the Second World War. In March 1946, the ground attracted its record crowd, 19,000, for a match between Aberavon and a New Zealand Army team, "The Kiwis". The club became absolute owners of the ground in 1952, in a deal negotiated by Alderman Llewellyn Heycock, and various improvements and extensions were built in the 1950s, 1970s and 1980s. Although exclusively a rugby union venue for most of its existence, the Talbot Athletic Ground also hosted some matches played by the final Welsh professional rugby league side of the 20th century, South Wales, in 1996. The stadium has also hosted continental football matches. Afan Lido FC played the home leg of their Uefa Cup 1995/96, preliminary round, 1st leg tie against RAF Jelgava at the ground.
