= Josh Morse =

Welsh rugby union player

- Born: Josh Morse; 13 October 2004 (age 22) Llandovery, Wales
- Height: 180 cm (5 ft 11 in)
- Weight: 118 kg (260 lb)
- School: Coleg Sir Gâr

Rugby union career
- Position: Prop
- Current team: Scarlets
Youth career
- Llandovery
Senior career
Years	Team	Apps	(Points)
2024–	Llandovery	15	(10)
2025–	Scarlets	4	(0)
International career
Years	Team	Apps	(Points)
2022	Wales U18		
2023–2024	Wales U20	12	(5)

Josh Morse (born 13 October 2004) is a Welsh rugby union player who plays for the Scarlets as a prop.

== Early life ==
Morse came through the youth ranks at his hometown club Llandovery RFC, before playing for Llandeilo RFC and Ammanford RFC. Morse attended Coleg Sir Gâr.

== Club career ==
=== Llandovery RFC ===
Morse played for Llandovery RFC in Super Rygbi Cymru, but missed the entirety of the 2024–25 season due to a knee injury. He made his return to rugby in September 2025 for Llandovery, scoring against Newport RFC. Morse scored again against Newport in a comeback win later in the season.

=== Scarlets ===
Morse was part of the Scarlets U18 team for the 2022–23 Regional Age Grade championship.

Ahead of the 2025–26 United Rugby Championship, Morse signed a contract with the Scarlets. Morse was named in the squad to play in a pre-season friendly against Llandovery and Carmarthen.

Morse made his debut off the bench against the Ospreys in the 2025 Boxing Day derby, alongside fellow academy product Elis Price. Morse was recognised as the Breakthrough of the Season.

Morse was promoted to the senior squad ahead of the 2026–27 season. He scored his first try in a preseason friendly against Saracens.

== International career ==
=== Wales U18 and U20 ===
In 2022, Morse was selected for the Wales U18 team, to play against England U18.

Morse was named in the Wales U20 squad for the 2023 Six Nations Under 20s Championship, and retained for the 2023 World Rugby U20 Championship.

He made his first start for the side during the 2024 Six Nations Under 20s Championship, against Ireland U20. Morse scored a try in the following fixture against France U20.
