= 2024–25 Super Rygbi Cymru =

- Countries: Wales
- Date: 12 September 2024 – 18 May 2025
- Champions: Newport (1st title)
- Runners-up: Ebbw Vale
- Matches played: 99

The 2024–25 Super Rygbi Cymru was the inaugural season of the Super Rygbi Cymru, Wales's national semi-professional rugby union competition, organised by the Welsh Rugby Union (WRU). It involved ten clubs, nine from across South Wales, six of which had previously participated in the Celtic League, and RGC 1404 located in Colwyn Bay, North Wales. The season fixtures were announced in May 2024, with the season kicking off in September and wrapping up in May 2025. A challenger shield was introduced, known as the SRC Challenge Shield. Held by Llandovery going into the season, Ebbw Vale won the shield in their first meeting and held it for the remainder of the season. The SRC Cup, a knockout cup competition played during the season over the Six Nations Championship rounds, was also introduced. Llandovery were the inaugural winners, defeating Ebbw Vale 39–7.

Newport RFC won the inaugural title defeating regional rivals, Ebbw Vale RFC 27–18 in the Final at Eugene Cross Park.

== Competition and format ==
The 2024–25 Super Rygbi Cymru is structured as a closed-league with a round-robin format followed by a play-off series to conclude the season winners. Each of the ten teams play each other twice on a home-and-away basis across three blocks: September to October (break during Autumn Internationals; November to January; and finally March to May. The 2024–25 Super Rygbi Cymru used the standard bonus points system used in Great Britain and Ireland with a new addition: a bonus point for winning by fifteen points or more. This meant that six points were up for grabs per match.

At the conclusion of the regular season the top six teams would progress to the Quarter-finals, with the top four earning home advantage. The remaining four teams placed 7th to 10th would play in a Wildcard play-off round. The winner of each Wildcard play-off would advance to the Quarter-finals to play the first-placed team or second-placed team. The winners of the Quarter-finals would then advance to play in the Semi-finals, with the winners of that round advancing to the Final to conclude the season champions.

== SRC Cup ==
Pool A

Pos	Team	Pld	W	D	L	PF	PA	PD	TF	TA	B	Pts	Qualification
1	Llandovery	4	4	0	0	191	129	+62	28	19	6	22	Cup final
2	RGC 1404	4	2	0	2	158	183	−25	23	26	5	13	
3	Bridgend Ravens	4	2	0	2	136	147	−11	21	22	4	12	
4	Aberavon	4	1	0	3	135	150	−15	20	24	6	10	
5	Cardiff	4	1	0	3	114	125	−11	18	19	5	9	

Source: Cardiff

Pool B

Pos	Team	Pld	W	D	L	PF	PA	PD	TF	TA	B	Pts	Qualification
1	Ebbw Vale	4	4	0	0	119	60	+59	17	7	5	21	Cup final
2	Newport	4	3	0	1	151	108	+43	21	16	6	18	
3	Pontypool	4	2	0	2	94	109	−15	11	15	3	11	
4	Swansea	4	1	0	3	113	134	−21	16	20	5	9	
5	Carmarthen Quins	4	0	0	4	79	145	−66	13	20	3	3	

Source: Carmarthen Quins

=== Cup final ===
21 March 2025

Llandovery	39–7	Ebbw Vale
	Report

Church Bank Playing Fields, Llandovery

== Regular season ==
=== Table ===
Pos	Team	Pld	W	D	L	PF	PA	PD	TF	TA	B	Pts	Qualification
1	Cardiff	18	13	0	5	610	422	+188	93	55	25	77	Quarter-finals
2	Ebbw Vale (S)	18	13	0	5	537	378	+159	72	50	22	74	Quarter-finals
3	Newport (C)	18	13	0	5	584	426	+158	86	55	21	73	Quarter-finals
4	Llandovery	18	12	0	6	560	491	+69	77	64	20	68	Quarter-finals
5	Pontypool	18	10	0	8	567	511	+56	75	70	19	59	Quarter-finals
6	Aberavon	18	6	0	12	456	504	−48	65	74	18	42	Quarter-finals
7	Bridgend Ravens	18	6	0	12	439	573	−134	62	80	16	40	Wildcard round
8	RGC 1404	18	7	0	11	515	621	−106	61	89	9	37	Wildcard round
9	Carmarthen Quins	18	6	0	12	404	577	−173	54	82	12	36	Wildcard round
10	Swansea	18	4	0	14	402	571	−169	55	81	12	28	Wildcard round

Source: Carmarthen Quins, Cardiff, South Wales Guardian
(C) Champion; (S) SRC Challenge Shield holder

=== Fixtures ===
Home \ Away	ABE	BRI	CAR	QUI	EBB	LLA	NEW	PON	RGC	SWA
Aberavon	—	28–29	22–44	24–18	19–14	26–33	32–26	26–24	34–18	26–0
Bridgend Ravens	30–27	—	14–29	29–35	18–34	34–33	14–17	26–29	28–34	38–10
Cardiff	31–14	47–14	—	50–0	29–12	43–48	20–27	27–10	34–26	32–22
Carmarthen Quins	17–24	32–24	31–19	—	11–39	22–27	21–54	41–31	29–21	39–29
Ebbw Vale	34–22	48–17	32–20	40–20	—	38–29	20–5	34–3	31–16	21–17
Llandovery	33–28	28–12	19–52	35–5	28–31^{1st}	—	38–21	38–27	31–23	42–13
Newport	29–19	41–22	30–36	31–20	40–14	28–30	—	38–35	62–7	33–28
Pontypool	45–39	58–25	47–27	42–17	23–16	18–21	17–14	—	32–20	41–31
RGC 1404	59–38	19–38	25–32	29–24	41–39	28–23	26–41	61–42	—	34–20
Swansea	10–8	24–27	29–38	27–22	20–40	42–24	27–35	10–43	43–28	—

Source: Welsh Rugby Union
Legend: Blue = home team win; Yellow = draw; Red = away team win.

== Play-offs ==
=== Bracket ===
Wildcard Round
7	Bridgend Ravens	33
10	Swansea	30
8	RGC 1404	12
9	Carmarthen Quins	15

Quarter-finals
1	Cardiff	31
7	Bridgend Ravens	19
3	Newport	40
6	Aberavon	25
2	Ebbw Vale	45
9	Carmarthen Quins	35
4	Llandovery	39
5	Pontypool	20

Semi-finals
1	Cardiff	20
3	Newport	35
2	Ebbw Vale	29
4	Llandovery	28

Grand Final
3	Newport	27
2	Ebbw Vale	18

=== Wildcard Round ===
24 April 2025

Bridgend Ravens	33–30	Swansea
	Report

Brewery Field, Bridgend

26 April 2025

RGC 1404	12–15	Carmarthen Quins
	Report

Eirias Stadium, Colwyn Bay

=== Quarter-finals ===
3 May 2025

Ebbw Vale	45–35	Carmarthen Quins

3 May 2025

Llandovery	39–20	Pontypool
	Report

Church Bank Playing Fields, Llandovery

3 May 2025

Newport	40–25	Aberavon

Newport Stadium, Lliswerry

3 May 2025

Cardiff	31–19	Bridgend Ravens
	Report

Cardiff Arms Park, Cardiff

=== Semi-finals ===
10 May 2025

Ebbw Vale	29–28	Llandovery
	Report

Eugene Cross Park, Ebbw Vale

11 May 2025

Cardiff	20–35	Newport
	Report

Cardiff Arms Park, Cardiff

=== Grand Final ===
18 May 2025

Ebbw Vale	18–27	Newport
	Report

Eugene Cross Park, Ebbw Vale
