= 2018–19 Principality Premiership =

- Countries: Wales
- Date: 1 September 2018 – 18 May 2019
- Champions: Merthyr (3rd title)
- Relegated: Bedwas; Cross Keys; Bargoed; Neath
- Matches played: 240

The 2018–19 Principality Premiership was the third season of the new format of the Principality Premiership, the top tier of club rugby in Wales run by the Welsh Rugby Union. It was contested by sixteen Welsh clubs following an expansion from twelve teams at the start of the 2016–17 season. The 2018–19 season saw the end of "ring-fencing" and relegation returned for this season with four teams being automatically relegated to the 2019–20 WRU Championship and a fifth team avoiding relegation by winning a play-off. The competition was won by Merthyr for the third consecutive year.

== Structure ==
The structure this year has reverted to a traditional league. Each team will play each other team on a home and away basis for a total of 30 games. League points are awarded as such – 4 points for a win, 2 for a draw and 0 for a loss. Teams can also earn an additional bonus point by scoring four or more tries in a match and/or losing by less than seven points. This season sees the return of relegation from the Premiership after two seasons of ring fencing. The bottom four sides will automatically be relegated to the Championship for the 2019–20 season. The 12th placed side will play-off against the winners of the 2018–19 WRU Championship at a neutral venue to determine the 12th team in next season's Premiership. If the winners of the Championship do not have an 'A License' necessary to compete in the Premiership, then the 12th placed team will remain in the Premiership for next season.

== Teams ==
The same 16 teams that competed the previous season competed again this season. Merthyr are the reigning champions and are aiming to win the league for the third year in succession.

Locations of the 2018–19 Principality Premiership teams with colour markers to represent the region they belong to:

Orange = Dragons
Blue = Cardiff Blues
Black = Ospreys
Red = Scarlets

- RGC acts as a de facto club representing North Wales

Club	Stadium	Capacity	Area
Aberavon	Talbot Athletic Ground	3,000	Port Talbot, Neath Port Talbot
Bargoed	Bargoed Park	1,500	Bargoed, Caerphilly
Bedwas	Bridge Field	2,000	Bedwas, Caerphilly
Bridgend	Brewery Field	8,000	Bridgend
Cardiff	Cardiff Arms Park	12,125	Cardiff
Carmarthen Quins	Carmarthen Park	3,000	Carmarthen, Carmarthenshire
Cross Keys	Pandy Park	3,000	Crosskeys, Caerphilly
Ebbw Vale	Eugene Cross Park	8,000	Ebbw Vale, Blaenau Gwent
Llandovery	Church Bank Playing Fields	3,000	Llandovery, Carmarthenshire
Llanelli	Parc y Scarlets	14,870	Llanelli, Carmarthenshire
Merthyr	The Wern	4,500	Merthyr Tydfil
Neath	The Gnoll	6,000	Neath, Neath Port Talbot
Newport	Rodney Parade	11,676	Newport
Pontypridd	Sardis Road	7,861	Pontypridd, Rhondda Cynon Taf
RGC 1404	Eirias Stadium	6,000	Colwyn Bay, Conwy
Swansea	St Helen's	4,500	Swansea

== Standings ==
2018–19 Principality Premiership Table
Pos	Team	Pld	W	D	L	PF	PA	PD	TF	TA	TB	LB	Pts	Result
1	Merthyr (C)	30	23	0	7	885	591	+294	130	74	23	2	117	Champions
2	Cardiff	30	22	1	7	991	660	+331	129	87	17	4	111	
3	Pontypridd	30	22	0	8	1015	580	+435	140	76	18	4	110	
4	Llandovery	30	21	1	8	854	551	+303	112	67	15	3	104	
5	Ebbw Vale	30	20	1	9	762	594	+168	95	73	9	4	95	
6	Aberavon	30	18	2	10	698	603	+95	98	81	10	4	90	
7	Newport	30	17	2	11	757	700	+57	97	96	11	5	88	
8	RGC 1404	30	14	1	15	859	650	+209	121	83	16	11	85	
9	Swansea	30	16	0	14	674	594	+80	91	75	13	4	81	
10	Carmarthen Quins	30	13	1	16	637	584	+53	77	67	8	9	71	
11	Bridgend	30	12	0	18	689	714	−25	87	90	9	9	66	
12	Llanelli	30	12	1	17	679	723	−44	91	96	10	3	63	Relegation play-off
13	Bedwas (R)	30	12	1	17	681	835	−154	86	113	8	4	62	Relegated to 2019–20 WRU Championship
14	Cross Keys (R)	30	5	1	24	586	1093	−507	75	160	9	5	36	Relegated to 2019–20 WRU Championship
15	Bargoed (R)	30	6	0	24	576	1003	−427	76	134	8	3	35	Relegated to 2019–20 WRU Championship
16	Neath (R)	30	1	0	29	406	1274	−868	51	184	2	3	3 (Note: Neath were deducted a total of 6 points for failing to fulfil fixtures against Bedwas and RGC 1404 in December.)	Relegated to 2019–20 WRU Championship

Updated to match(es) played on unknown. Source: "Principality Premiership". allwalessport.
Rules for classification: If teams are level at any stage, tiebreakers are applied in the following order:
1. Number of matches won
2. Number of tries scored
3. Ratio between points for:points against
  (C) Champion; (R) Relegated
  Notes:

== Promotion/relegation play-off ==
The 12th placed team of the Premiership (Llanelli) faced the winner of the Championship (Pontypool) to determine who will be in next season's Premiership. The play-off was a one-off game played at a neutral venue. The venue was announced as Aberavon's home ground the Tablbot Athletic Ground on 7 May 2019. Llanelli won the game and would therefore remain in the Premiership for the 2019–20 season. Pontypool would contest the Championship for the 2019–20 season

17 May 2019
19:05

Llanelli	27–16	Pontypool

Talbot Athletic Ground
