= Project Reset (Welsh Rugby Union reform) =

Proposed reform to regional rugby in Wales

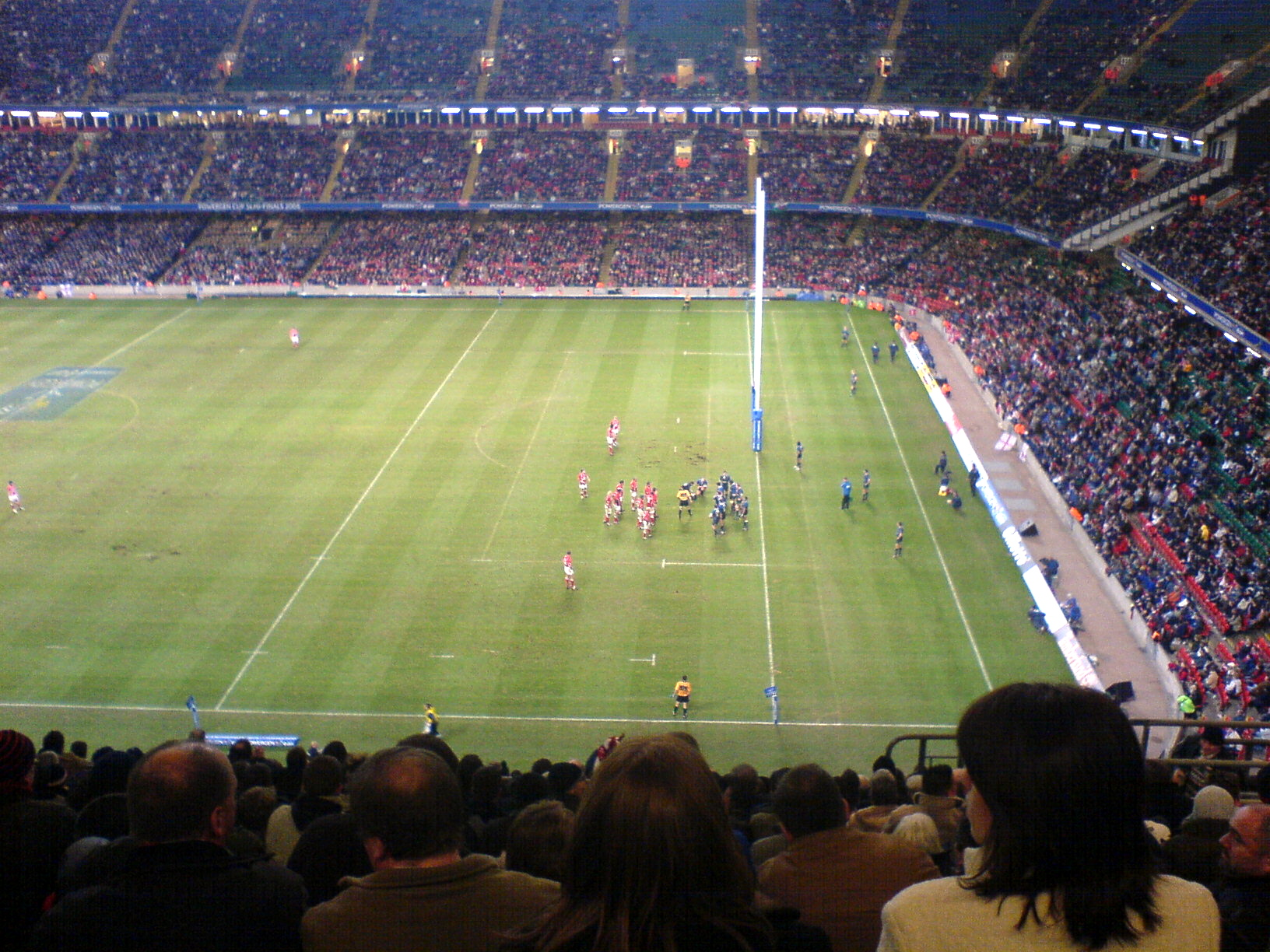
- Llanelli playing Bath at the Millennium Stadium in Cardiff
- Country: Wales
- Governing body: Welsh Rugby Union
- National team: Wales
- Registered players: 79,800

National competitions
- Rugby World Cup; Six Nations; Rugby World Cup Sevens; World Rugby Sevens Series

Club competitions
- Pro14; European Rugby Champions Cup; European Rugby Challenge Cup; LV Cup; British and Irish Cup

Project Reset is a proposed Welsh Rugby Union reform programme to restructure Welsh regional rugby. Recent years have indicated both regional and club rugby in Wales is in financial crisis, with sides such as Neath RFC closely defeating a liquidation order and Ospreys at risk of losing key players in 2019 and the 2019/20 season ahead.

A number of proposals are reportedly being mooted by the Union to reestablish Welsh rugby union as a competitor for nearby rivals such as the Irish Rugby Football Union and English Rugby Football Union whose sides have seen financial growth and test match success.

The Professional Rugby Board is reported to have concluded that the Ospreys and Scarlets should merge to form a west Wales super team in the pro 14, making room for a north Wales team affiliated to RGC 1404.

== Background ==
Rugby union in Wales is the national sport and is considered a large part of national culture. The sport is today managed by the Welsh Rugby Union (WRU) which formed in 1881. The main domestic competition in Wales is the Pro14, in which Wales have four regional sides in the competition: Ospreys, Cardiff Blues, Scarlets and Dragons. The sides also compete in the Europe-wide European Rugby Champions Cup, European Rugby Challenge Cup, and Anglo-Welsh Cup.

Since the regionalisation of professional Rugby Union in Wales, the national team has undoubtedly experienced great success, with some attributing this to the regional concept. The regions have been reasonably successful in the Pro12 (renamed Pro14 from 2017–18 forward), with Welsh teams winning on six occasions. The Ospreys are one of the most successful team in the history of the league with four titles (just short of the record five titles held by Leinster as of 2018). However, the Welsh sides have made little impact in the European Cup, with no team getting further than the semi-finals. A desire for success in Europe had been one of the principal reasons for setting up the regions in the first place.

=== 2013 dispute ===
The regions currently operate on a 2009 Participation Agreement which expires in 2019.

The regions in 2013 protested against a new agreement, as they felt it did not offer any funding commitments or clarity regarding competitions such as the Heineken Cup. The Union retorted that funding would increase but that regions would need to commit to the framework or risk losing their revenue streams.

=== 2018 rumoured solutions ===
In 2018 the WRU launched Project Reset to review regional arrangements. Faced with the financial dominance of French Top 14 and English Premiership Rugby sides, the WRU have in recent years increased salaries to bring Welsh international players such as Taulupe Faletau, Dan Biggar, Ross Moriarty, and Rhys Webb back into the Welsh league system. Yet the Union now feel the salary arrangements are unsustainable.

The WRU has established a Professional Rugby Board, composed of representatives from both the WRU and the regions, to discuss the proposed changes.

==== Proposal 1 - Merge Scarlets/Ospreys and Blues/Dragons ====
Under one proposal, the region system would decrease from four sides to two. Ospreys and the Scarlets would merge, as would Cardiff Blues and Dragons. Such proposals face widespread opposition from sections of supporters whose local loyalties would prevent them from travelling to traditionally 'rival' grounds to follow their team, standing in the terraces with their bitter rivals. Opponents of the proposal have also pointed to the struggles of the Scottish rugby union team in test fixtures since switching to a two-region model dominated by Edinburgh and Glasgow Warriors.

==== Proposal 2 - End the Dragons franchise or move it to North Wales ====
As the poorest performing franchise, the WRU have reportedly discussed moving the Dragons franchise to North Wales, or closing it altogether. This would be challenging given the side's contractual commitments, and its guarantees to ground share at Rodney Parade with Newport RFC and EFL League Two side Newport County A.F.C. until 2021. The WRU have proposed the resulting space then be filled by a North Wales side taking the place of Conwy-based, semi professional RGC 1404.

In recent years Dragons have improved their attendances however, so such a move is considered highly controversial and financially ineffective. The WRU nonetheless own both the team and the ground, so have strong control over the franchise's future.

A regional rugby franchise, originally known as Rygbi Gogledd Cymru (Welsh language for "Rugby North Wales") and later known as RGC 1404, was established in North Wales; plans called for the side to enter the Welsh Premier Division as early as 2010–11 and eventually the Celtic League/Pro12, but the venture was unsuccessful and was liquidated in 2011. The team, however, continues to play as part of Wales' national rugby academy. RGC 1404 also had a partnership with Rugby Canada by which the franchise would have a secondary role of developing players for the Canada national rugby union team, at least until enough local players were developed to fill a complete competitive squad.

==== Proposal 3 - Merge Cardiff Blues and Ospreys ====
As the most successful side in Pro14 (previously Celtic League) history, Ospreys now face significant issues, with reports of debts and stalled contract negotiations threatening their claim to players such as Alun Wyn Jones and head coach Allen Clarke. Managing director Andrew Millward had described the struggle, involving year long budget cuts and structural flaws in the Welsh rugby system, as leaving Wales unable to compete with rivals IRFU and FRR.

Facing a merger with Cardiff Blues however, Ospreys supporters have pushed back, arguing that the removal of the Ospreys franchise from the Swansea region would leave one of Wales' rugby heartlands without a local region side, instead forced to travel to their rivals ground at Cardiff Arms Park.

Blues supporters also point to the fierce battle their side won to remain in their traditional Cardiff RFC colours and name back in 2003, and are unwilling to adopt a new identity.

==== Proposal 4 - Merge Ospreys and Scarlets ====
More recent discussions have punted merging western sides Scarlets and Ospreys, with the Llanelli and Swansea teams either sharing grounds or moving fully. Scarlets opposed such a merger with Ospreys back in 2003, with the late Stuart Gallacher famously opposed to any arrangement which would have ended the Scarlets name.

A report by the BBC indicated that the Professional Rugby Board concluded the Ospreys and Scarlets should merge, to play as early as next season (2019-20). The Irish Times report that it was agreed that current players contracts will be honoured, with Scarlets head coach Brad Mooar and Ospreys boss Allen Clarke serving in coaching roles at the new side. Venues would be split, with Guinness Pro 14 fixtures played at Parc y Scarlets in Llanelli, European games at Swansea’s Liberty Stadium, and the Ospreys Llandarcy training ground as the chosen training site. Formation of a north Wales Pro 14 side would then be possible.

== Result ==
As of 6 March 2019, a statement by Scarlets indicated that the talks to merge with Ospreys had broken down, with the Llanelli side no longer interested in the deal. As a result, the PRB will continue its discussions of all options.
