= Rugby union in Wales =

National sport of Wales

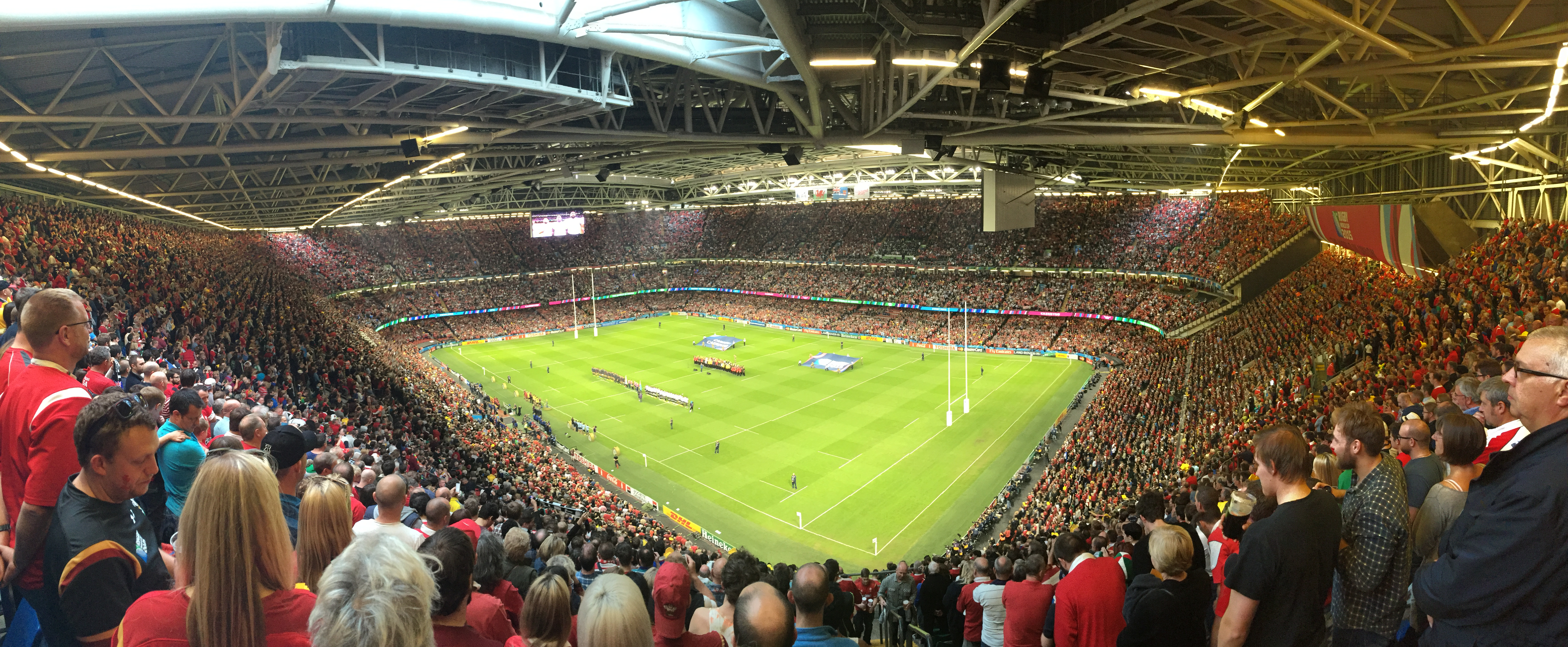
- The national stadium of Wales, the Millennium Stadium in Cardiff, hosting the Wales vs Fiji match at the 2015 Rugby World Cup.
- Country: Wales
- Governing body: Welsh Rugby Union
- National team: Wales
- Registered players: 79,800
- Clubs: 300+ (system)

National competitions
- Rugby World Cup; Six Nations; Rugby World Cup Sevens; World Rugby Sevens Series

Club competitions
- United Rugby Championship; European Rugby Champions Cup; European Rugby Challenge Cup; Super Rygbi Cymru; Premiership; WRU Challenge Cup; Silver Ball Trophy

Rugby union in Wales is considered a large part of the culture of Wales. Wales has the largest proportion of rugby union supporters in Europe with 44% of the people liking the sport, making it the most popular sport in Wales.

Rugby union is thought to have reached Wales in the 1850s, with the national body, the Welsh Rugby Union (WRU) being formed in 1881. Wales is considered to be one of the most successful national sides in Rugby Union, having won the most Six Nations Championships after England, as well as having reached 3 World Cup semi finals in 1987, 2011 and 2019, having finished 3rd in the inaugural competition and having finished 4th in 2011 in a repeat of the first third place play-off. The Welsh team of the 1970s is considered to be one of the greatest national teams of all time. As of February 2025, they are ranked 12th in the world.

The Wales national team play at the WRU-owned Principality Stadium, and compete annually in the Six Nations Championship, as well as having competed at every Rugby World Cup. Wales is ranked as a tier-1 nation by World Rugby. Wales also competes as one of the 15 "core teams" in the annual World Rugby Sevens Series, and won the 2009 Rugby World Cup Sevens.

The main domestic competition in Wales is the United Rugby Championship (formerly called Pro 14, and before that the Celtic League). Four regional sides (Ospreys, Cardiff, Scarlets, and Dragons) represent Wales in the competition, which also includes sides from Ireland, Scotland, Italy, and South Africa. The regional sides also compete in the Europe-wide European Rugby Champions Cup and European Rugby Challenge Cup.

Club rugby is represented by over 200 WRU affiliated clubs who play in the Welsh Premier Division and the lower Welsh Divisional leagues. Prominent clubs include Cardiff, Newport, Swansea, Llanelli, Bridgend, Neath, Pontypool, Pontypridd, and England-based London Welsh.

== History ==
=== Rugby-like sports and early rugby in Wales ===
Rugby-like games have a long history in Wales, and the first written record of such sports in Great Britain is found in 9th century Wales. The Historia Brittonum is credited to the Welsh monk Nennius and features descriptions of such team ball-games that suggest they were well understood in early medieval Wales and that there was a popular belief that these were ancient games, played since at least Romano-British times.

Descriptions of unnamed ball-games are found in Medieval Welsh literature, Welsh poetry, Welsh mythology and Arthurian literature and these games were the antecedents to the medieval football games and traditional Welsh sports played throughout the country in later centuries. In the early seventeenth century, George Owen of Henllys stated that one of these sports, Cnapan had indeed been designed to improve both the strength and stamina of its players as a form of war training for the ancient Britons. Cnapan was markedly similar to the game codified by English Public Schools in the 19th century. The sport featured ball-handling, backward passing, and "scrummages" between the "sturdy gamesmen" who would have been the equivalent of the pack of forwards in modern rugby and a restart approximating a lineout in Rugby Union. However, the increase in popularity of Rugby Union across Wales saw interest in these ancient sports gradually decline.

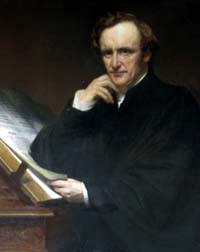
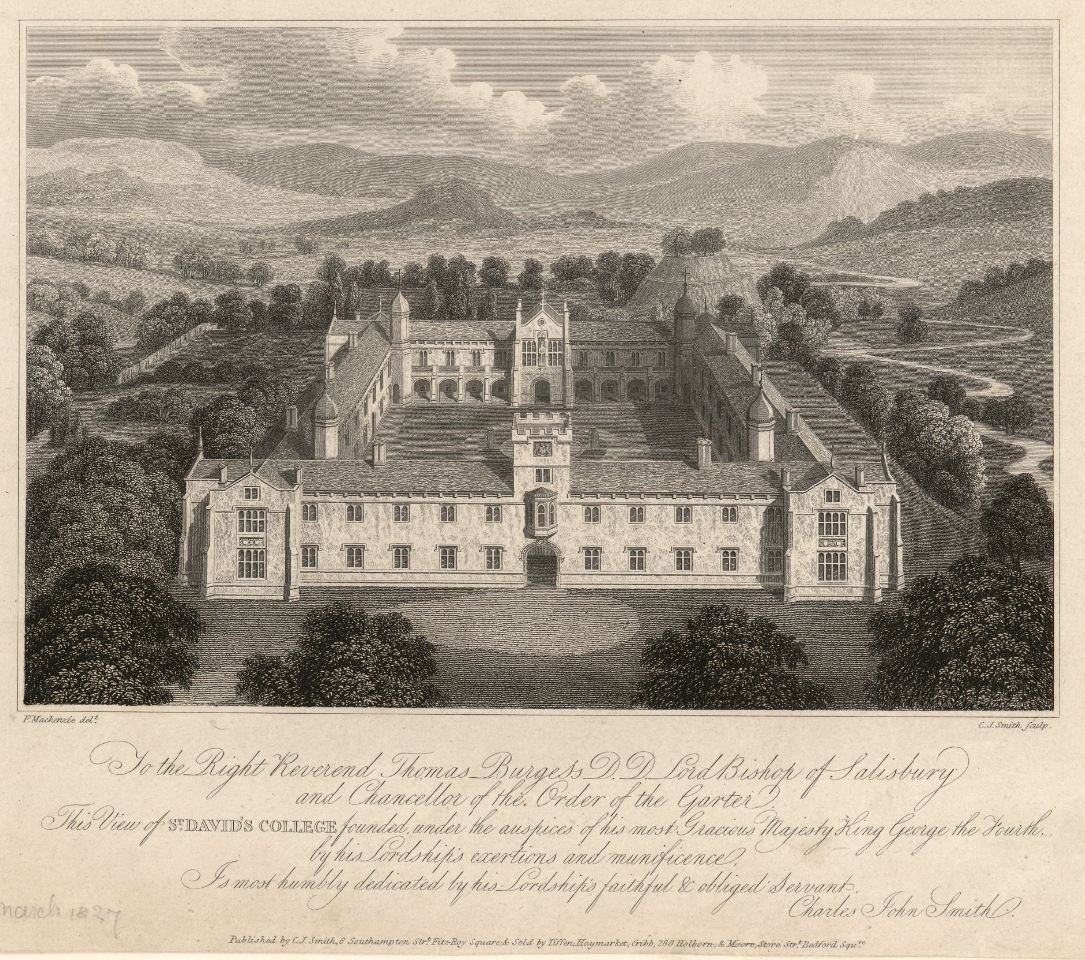
Reverend Professor Rowland Williams is credited with introducing Rugby to Wales, with St. David's College, Lampter believed to have fielded the first Welsh team to play under Rugby laws

The introduction of Rugby football into Wales is credited to the Reverend Professor Rowland Williams who brought the game to St. David's College, Lampeter from his time at Cambridge University and the College fielded Wales' first "rugby team" in 1850.

Rugby union initially expanded in Wales through ex-pupils of the Welsh colleges settling, or students from English colleges and universities returning to the larger industrial hubs of South Wales. This is reflected in the first clubs to embrace the sport in the early to mid-1870s, with Neath RFC widely recognised as the first Welsh Rugby Club. The strength of Welsh rugby union developed over the following years, which could be attributed to the 'big four' South Wales clubs of Newport (who lost only seven games under the captaincy of Llewellyn Lloyd between the 1900/01 and 1902/03 seasons), Cardiff, Llanelli (who lost just twice in 1894 and 1895) and Swansea. With the coming of industrialisation and the railways, rugby union too was spread as workers from the main cities brought the game to the new steel and coal towns of South Wales. Merthyr formed in 1876, Brecon in 1874, Penygraig in 1877; as the towns adopted the new sport they reflected the growth and expansion of a new industrial Wales.

The South Wales Football Club was established in 1875 to try to incorporate a standard set of rules and expand the sport and this was succeeded by the Welsh Rugby Union which was formed in 1881. With the forming of the WFU (which would become the Welsh Rugby Union in 1934), Wales began competing in recognised international matches, with the first game, against England, also in 1881. The first Welsh team although fairly diverse in the geography of the clubs represented, did not appear to truly represent the strength available to Wales. The team was mainly made up of ex-Cambridge and Oxford university graduates and the selection was heavily criticised in the local press after the crushing defeat by England.

=== 1880s and 1890s ===
In the 19th century as well as the established clubs there were many 'scratch' teams populating most towns, informal pub or social teams that would form and disband quickly. Llanelli, as an example, in the 1880s was home not only to Llanelli RFC, but also to Gower Road, Seasiders, Morfa Rangers, Prospect Place Rovers, Wern Foundry, Cooper Mills Rangers, New Dock Strollers, Vauxhall Juniors, Moonlight Rovers and Gilbert Street Rovers. These teams would come and go, but some would merge into more settled clubs which exist today, Cardiff RFC was itself formed from three teams, Glamorgan, Tredegarville and Wanderers Football Clubs.

By the 1890s Rugby Union had become "the obsession of the working class" with crowds of 30-40,000 travelling great distances to attend matches facilitated by increased press coverage and new infrastructure. Wales won the 1893 Home Nations Championship for the first time, also winning their first Triple Crown (for defeating England, Scotland and Ireland). The decade also saw the emergence of the first super-stars of Welsh rugby, players such as Arthur Gould, Billy Bancroft and Gwyn Nicholls would usher in not only the first golden era of Welsh rugby union, but would also see the introduction of specialised positional players.

=== The first golden era 1900-1911 ===
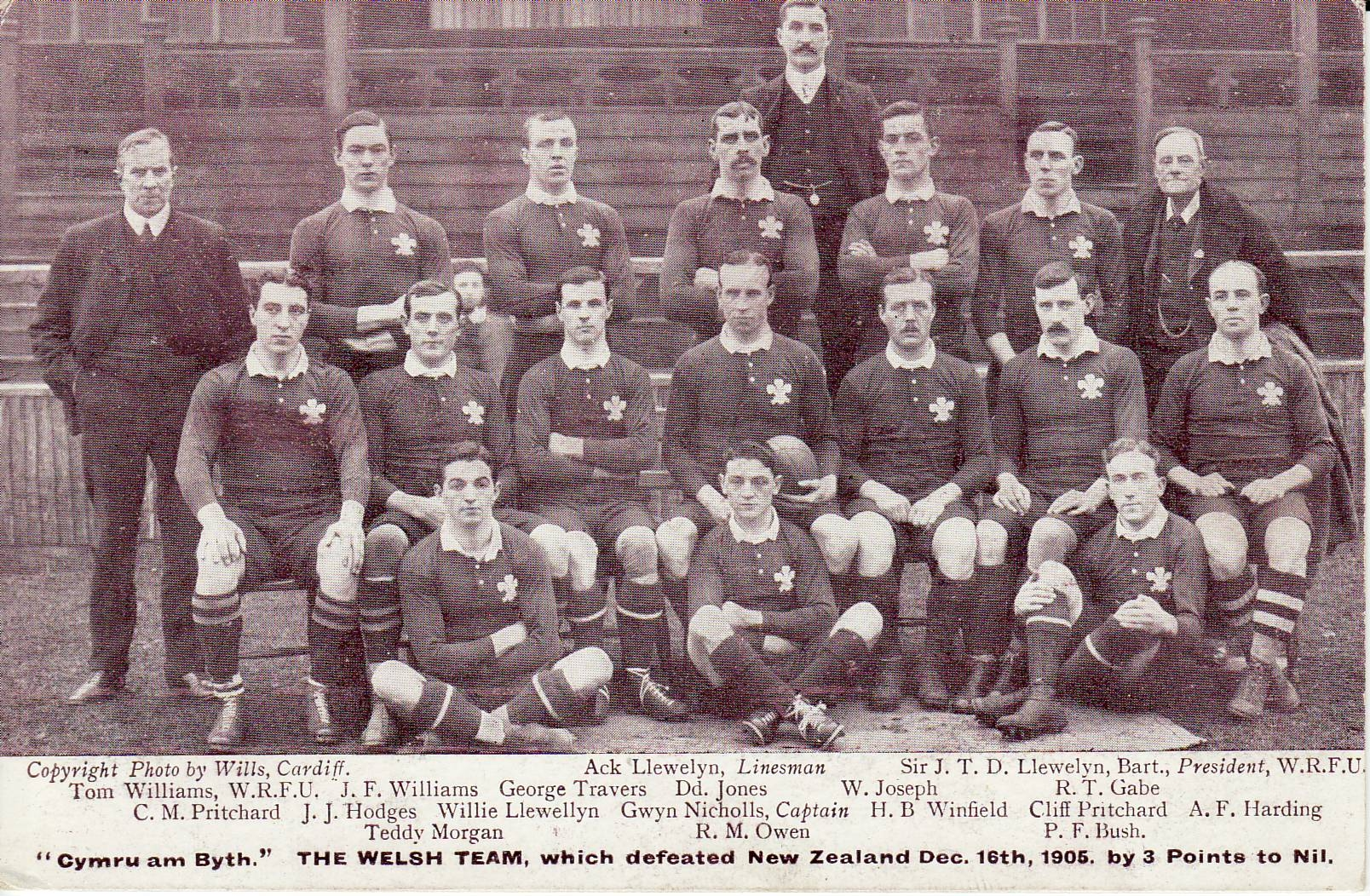
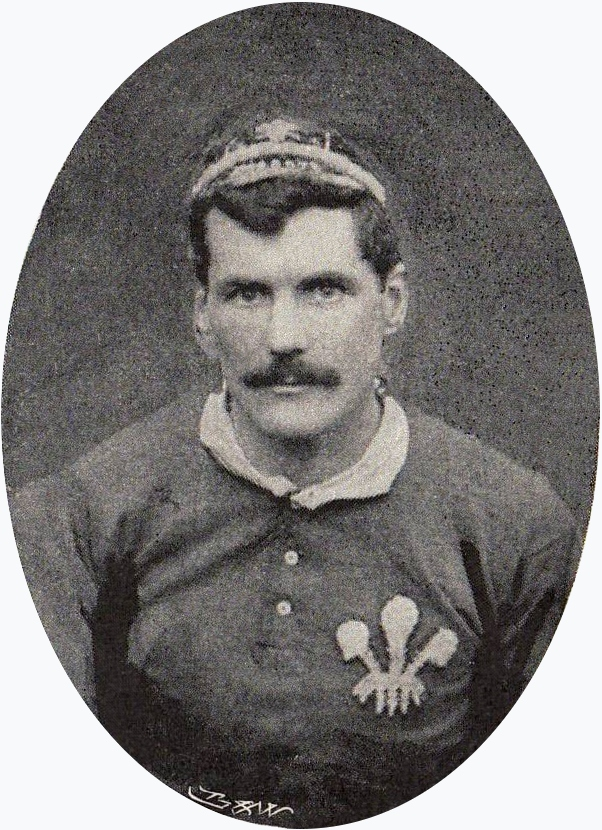
The impact of rugby on Welsh culture changed forever on 16 December 1905, when the Welsh national team (left) became the first to beat the Original All Blacks in what is known as the "Match of the Century". Superstar rugby players such as Arthur "Monkey" Gould (right) becoming celebrated across the nation

The first 'Golden Era' of Welsh rugby is so called due to the success achieved by the national team during the early 20th century. Wales had already won the Triple Crown in 1893, but between 1900 and 1914 the team would win the trophy on six occasions, and with France joining the tournament (unofficially in 1908 and 1909) three Grand Slams.

With the introduction of specialised players like hooker George Travers, the WFU could no longer choose the 'best players' to represent Wales, they needed to think tactically and choose people who could do a specific job on the pitch. This period of Welsh rugby would see the grip of the 'Big Four' clubs providing the bulk of national players, slip slightly. The WFU still tended to turn to the likes of Swansea and Newport to supply the skillful back players and usually kept club half-back pairings together such as Jones and Owen of Swansea. But it was the introduction of the 'Rhondda Forward' which saw men who worked day in day out in the coal, iron and tin mines enter the Welsh front row. Chosen for their strength and aggressive tackling, players such as Dai 'Tarw' Jones from Treherbert and Dai Evans from Penygraig added muscle to the front row.

Although a progressive time for international rugby, this period initially saw regression for many of the club sides in the form of the temperance movement. In the early 1900s, rugby was seen as a wicked temptation to the young men of the mining and steel communities, leading to violence and drink, and the valley areas in particular were part of a strong Nonconformist Baptist movement. The religious revival saw some communities completely reject rugby and local clubs, like Senghenydd, disbanded for several years. It wasn't until the 1910s that the social view of rugby would change the other way, fostered by mine owners as a great social unifier; and like baseball in America would be portrayed as a '...source of community integration because it installed civic pride'.

Unlike the game in England, rugby union in Wales was never seen as a sport for gentlemen of higher learning. Although this was fostered in the first international Welsh team, the fast absorption of the sport into the working class areas appeared to sever the link of rugby as a sport for the middle and upper classes.

As rugby became linked with the hard working men of the industrialised areas of Wales, it should also be noted that the sport did not escape the hardships of the industries. In 1913 five members of the Senghenydd team were killed in Britain's worst colliery disaster and many more lost their lives in the 'slow drip' of deaths caused by the industries. Far worse was to follow during the conflict of World War I when many teams lost members, including Welsh internationals like Charlie Pritchard and Johnny Williams.

=== Turmoil of the 1920s ===
The 1920s were a difficult time for Welsh rugby. The first golden period was over and the players that made up the teams that won four Triple Crowns had already disbanded before the Great War. The war could not be blamed for the downturn in Welsh fortunes as all the home nations lost their young talent in equal numbers. The fact that so many of Wales' talented stars had retired from rugby before 1910 was felt when Wales failed to win the tournament in the few years leading up to the war. But the main reason for Welsh failure on the rugby pitch can be mapped to an economic failures of Wales as a country. The First World War had created an unrealistic demand for coal, and in the 1920s the collapse in the need for coal resulted in a massive level of unemployment throughout the south Wales valleys. This in turn led to mass emigration as people left Wales for work. The knock-on effect was felt in the port cities of Newport and Cardiff, that relied on the transportation of coal.

Suddenly the call of the professional league was a very strong draw to men who could not claim money for playing union. Between 1919 and 1939, Forty-eight capped Welsh rugby union players joined league rugby. The fact that the equivalent of three full national squads left the sport can only allude to the number of trialists and club members that also left the sport. Exceptional players lost to the league game included Jim Sullivan of Cardiff, William Absalom of Abercarn and Emlyn Jenkins of Treorchy.

The other side of the depression was linked to those people that stayed behind. In homes where men were the only earners, the decline in heavy labour areas resulted in very stark choices in where the household money could be spent. It was difficult to justify paying to watch rugby when there was little money for food and rent. With crowds dwindling clubs were forced to drastic measures in the hope of survival. Loughor which had produced five internationals in the 1920s were by 1929 begging door to door for old kit. Haverfordwest disbanded from 1926–29, Pembroke Dock Quins were reduced to 5 members by 1927 and in the valleys the Treherbert, Llwynypia and Nantyffyllon clubs had vanished before 1930. Even clubs of the size of Pontypool were not spared; in 1927 they were playing and beating the Waratahs and the Maoris, by 1930 they were £2,000 in debt and facing bankruptcy.

Another reason for the fall in the Welsh union game can be placed on the improvement of football in Wales. Traditionally seen as a game more associated with North Wales, the success of Cardiff Football Club in the 1920s was a strong draw for many supporters. With two F.A. Cup Finals in 1925 and 1927, Cardiff were making the once unpopular sport of 'soccer' very fashionable, for fans and sportsmen alike.

During the 1920s the one team that appeared to be unaffected by the double threat of soccer and debt was Llanelli. The Scarlets had an unswerving loyalty shown by their home supporters, who were repaid by exciting, high scoring matches. During the 1925/26 season the club were unbeaten and the next season they had achieved the feat of defeating Cardiff on four occasions. This success would later be reflected in the growing number of Llanelli players that would represent their country in the 1920s, including Albert Jenkins, Ivor Jones and Archie Skym.

Apart from a few sporadic victories from the national team, there appeared little to cheer about in the 1920s for Welsh rugby at club or country level; but the seeds of recovery were being planted during the same decade. On June 9, 1923 the Welsh Secondary Schools Rugby Union was established in Cardiff. Founded by Dr R Chalke, head of Porth Secondary School with WRU members Horace Lyne as president and Eric Evans as secretary. Its aim was to promote rugby at school level in an attempt to regain 'the glorious days of Gwyn Nicholls, Willie Llewellyn and Dr E.T. Morgan'. In April 1923, at the Arms Park, Wales played their first secondary schools fixture led by future international Watcyn Thomas, who would progress to captain the first Welsh University XV in 1926. Over the coming years, schools such as Cardiff High School, Llanelli County School, Llandovery and Christ College, Brecon fostered a generation of players which would fill the Welsh ranks over the coming years. Wales had in effect begun to mimic the systems adopted by England and Scotland, that rugby should be nurtured from youth, through adolescence to adulthood.

The 1920s closed with the formation of the West Wales Rugby Union, an event that initially appeared to be a positive indication of growth, but in fact the union was formed by western clubs to wrest control away from the WRU. The West Wales clubs had become disenchanted in decisions made by their parent body and believed the Union had no interest in the lower tier clubs, allowing them to become mere feeders for the bigger clubs.

=== The Welsh revival 1930-1939 ===
The 1930s began on a high for Welsh international rugby, with success in the Home Nations Championship and the emergence of a strong Welsh team. In the 1931 Championship Wales beat Ireland at Ravenhill in a bruising affair that not only gave Wales the title but denied Ireland the Triple Crown. This may have signaled a change in fortunes in Welsh rugby but underneath the same problems that dogged Wales throughout the 1920s still remained. Wales was still suffering the effects of the depression and club rugby was struggling to survive. Even the WRU had problems, as it faced the fact that it was the only home union without their own ground. The Cardiff Arms was leased and St Helens was on loan.

From what at first appears to be yet another decade of turmoil for Welsh rugby, is actually regarded as a period of revival. The economic situation began turning from 1937, the WSSRU was bringing many exciting backs through the school system, North Wales embraced the game and the national team won two morale lifting games against England in 1933 and the All Blacks in 1935.

From a statistical point of view, the Welsh national team appeared to be winning roughly the same number of games throughout the 1930s as the poor 1920s period, but Wales were actually improving. In the 1920s most Welsh victories were against France, then the weakest team in the Five Nations Championship; but in 1931 France were excluded from the tournament over accusations of professionalism at club level and were not readmitted until after the 1939 tournament, just before international rugby was suspended because of the Second World War. Welsh victories were now coming against the more established home nation teams. During this period, Wales won three Championships, but its greatest victory happened during the 1933 tournament when they finished last. Since its first international game in 1910, Wales had failed to beat England at Twickenham in nine attempts. Now dubbed the 'Twickenham bogey', it took the self confidence of Cardiff's Ronnie Boon to break the losing streak as he scored a try and a drop goal to take the match 7-3. The game also saw the debut of two players who would become Welsh greats, Wilf Wooller and Vivian Jenkins.

Wales played host to two touring Southern Hemisphere teams in the 1930s, first came Bennie Osler's South Africa followed by Jack Manchester's All Blacks. The South Africans were rampant in Wales, winning the test match and all six club matches, though gained few supporters due to the kicking tactics Osler employed. The New Zealander's received a better welcome, and after the previous tour where the tourist went unbeaten the Welsh press were hoping for a return of the spirit that won the first encounter in 1905. Before the match with Wales, New Zealand were to face eight club teams over six games. After winning the opening three English county matches and then beating a joint Abertillery and Cross Keys the All Blacks were showing the same form shown in their first two tours, but then stumbled against Swansea. Swansea were not in a period of particular growth and the only two players showing any flair were Wales Schoolboy players Willie Davies and Haydn Tanner. During the game Merv Corner could not contain the attacking bursts from Tanner, the New Zealand flankers were drawn in which in turned allowed Davies the freedom to run which Claude Davey finished off with two tries. Jack Manchester's response to the Swansea win was to ask the New Zealand press "Tell them we have been beaten, but don't tell them it was by a pair of schoolboys". This win gave Swansea the honour of being the first club team to have beaten all three major Southern Hemisphere touring teams. The All Blacks were unbeaten in the next twenty matches, but lost to Wales in a classic game which Wales managed to win in the last ten minutes of the game after the Welsh hooker, Don Tarr, was stretchered off with a broken neck.

=== Post-war resurgence, halcyon 1950s and the changes of the 1960s ===
Schoolchildren from Lewis School, Pengam compete at a lineout in 1951 (left) and a Rugby themed dance at Whitchurch Rugby Club in 1952 (right).

The post-war years saw strong club teams emerge, but it wasn't until the 1950s that a true blend of players could be produced to translate club success into international victories. The coming of television saw an upsurge in popularity for the national team, but a decline in club support. Success was gained in the Five Nations Championship, Wales supplied many players to the ranks of the British Lions and New Zealand was beaten for the last time that century.

The decades following on from the Second World War were a boom time for Welsh rugby, though it took until the 1950s for the benefits to be seen on the playing fields. Although Britain was suffering from a post-war slump, attendance figures at club grounds saw an increase as rugby was again embraced as a spectator sport. Towns and villages which had seen their club disbanded during wartime saw their teams re-established. The WRU had 104 member clubs during the 1946-47 season; by the mid fifties there were 130, even though the Union had done nothing to relax its strict membership regulations.

By the 1950s Britain and Wales were beginning to benefit from improved economic conditions. This saw growth in consumer power and spending, which drew many people away from traditional spectator past times, such as sport and the cinema. With a newfound wealth the populace began switching from social pursuits to home entertainment, with the biggest draw being the availability of television. From the mid-fifties there was a significant drop in gate receipts as television became more and more popular. During the 1955 Five Nations Championship, the Scotland v. Wales match was televised live; at the same time an Aberavon v. Abertillery game which would normally draw a crowd of 4000 was unable to muster 400. This created a situation whereby rugby in Wales was gaining in popularity due to the number of people who could now watch the international matches, but support at club level declined. This forced club committees to adopt different strategies to keep their clubs afloat. Many teams set up 'coupon funds' to allow clothing rations to be contributed by members to buy kit. With careful management and thrift most clubs not only survived but grew. Throughout the 1950s and 1960s, with little money, many clubs were able to build new facilities or even own their grounds and club-houses for the first time in their history. In 1951 Glamorgan Wanderers purchased the Memorial Grounds in Ely and in 1952 Llanelli were able to purchase the rugby portion of Stradey Park. Similarly, 1954 saw Blaina construct a new stand while Llanharan were able to build their first changing rooms procured from RAF surplus units. These events were typical of club expansion through the 50s. It was around this time that club social activities were extended including the introduction of ladies’ committees.

Clubs also took matters into their own hands to promote themselves and their sport. 1947 saw the first unofficial club championship, won by Neath in its inaugural year, but dominated by Cardiff and Ebbw Vale until the 1960/61 season. In 1954 Welsh rugby sevens had their own tournament with the introduction of the Snelling Sevens competition, while Glamorgan County RFC introduced the Silver Ball Trophy in 1956 for the promotion of second tier clubs in the region.

The national team, after unconvincing displays during the 1940s, found unexpected success in the early 1950s winning the Grand Slam twice; in 1950 and 1952. The 1950 win came after a disastrous 1949 campaign, which saw Wales collect the wooden spoon; but after an opening win over England, the team finished the last three matches conceding only three points. The tournament saw the emergence of Welsh record-breaking player Ken Jones as a world class wing; who is most remembered for his late try against the 1953 touring New Zealand team. The 1950 championship is also remembered for the tragic events following the away win over Ireland, when a chartered flight, returning from the Triple Crown winning match, crashed at Llandow. Seventy five Welsh fans and five crew died in the accident; at the time it was the world's worst civil air disaster.

=== The second golden era 1969-1979 ===
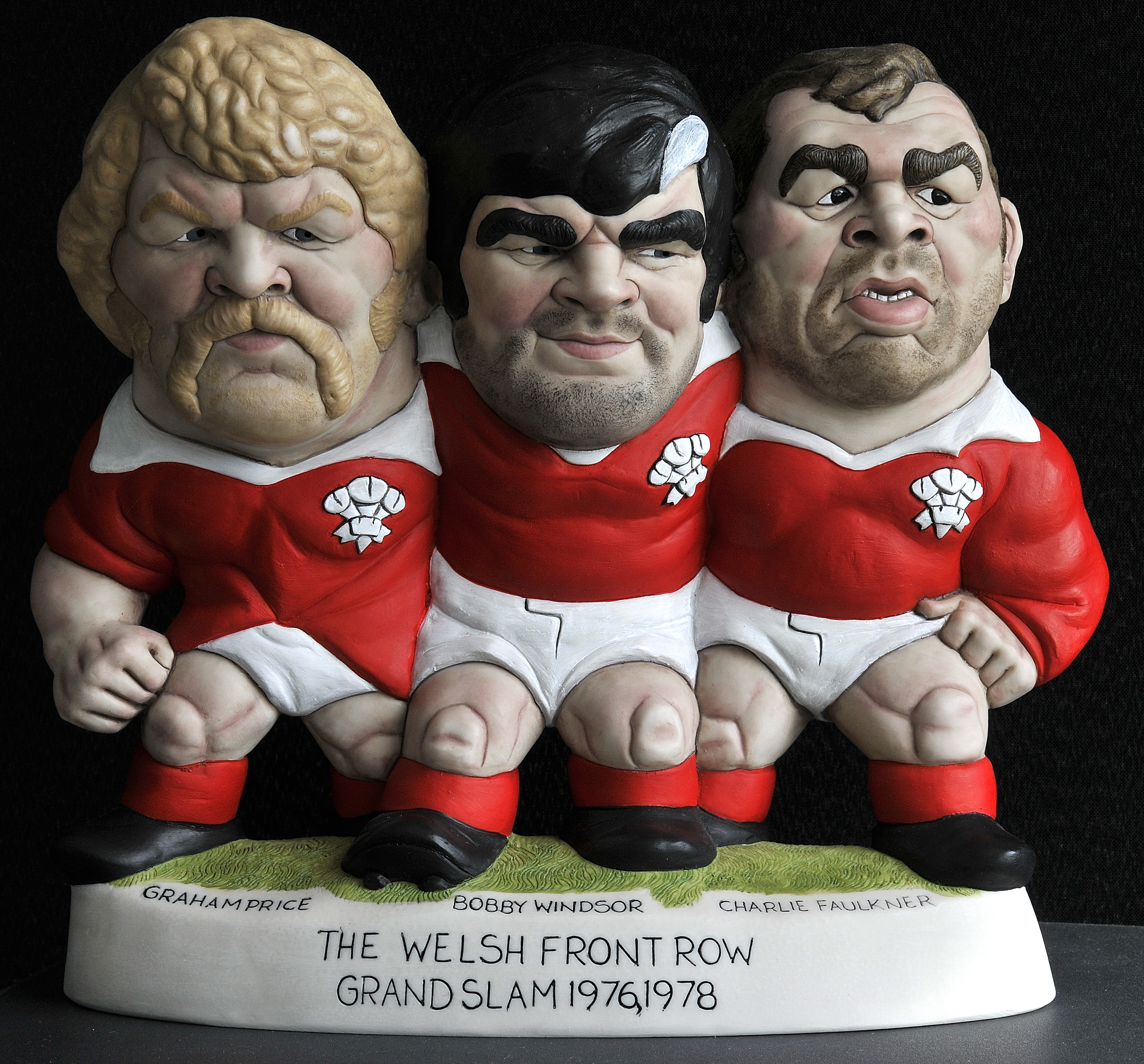
a Grogg of the Pontypool frontrow, (left to right: Graham Price, Bobby Windsor and Charlie Faulkner)

The zenith of Welsh rugby was the 1970s, when Wales had players such as Barry John, Gareth Edwards, Phil Bennett and J. P. R. Williams. Wales won four consecutive Triple Crowns.

Gareth Edwards was voted the greatest player of all time in a players poll in 2003 and scored what is widely regarded as the greatest try of all time in 1973 for the Barbarians against New Zealand.

=== Further turmoil in the 1980s and 1990s ===
"Welsh rugby, once a source of national pride, has now become part of that rapid erosion of identity which has thrown a big question-mark over what it means to be Welsh today."

— Statement on the decline of Welsh rugby and its impact on Welsh identity by The Campaign for a Welsh Assembly in 1992

The 1980s and early '90s were a difficult time for Welsh rugby union when the team suffered many defeats. Harsh economic times in the eighties meant that players such as Jonathan Davies and Scott Gibbs were tempted to 'go North' to play professional rugby league in order to earn a living.

=== Regional Rugby and Warren Gatland 2003-2025 ===
Messages of support for the Welsh national team at Newport railway station, displayed during the 2015 Rugby World Cup

In 2003/4 the Welsh Rugby Union voted to create five regions to play in the Celtic League (now the United Rugby Championship) and represent Wales in European competition. This soon became four when the Celtic Warriors were liquidated after just one season. The WRU have announced their hopes of developing a fifth region in North Wales in the long run; the team at the centre of this plan is now known as RGC 1404.

In recent years, Welsh Premier Division and Welsh Championship club rugby has faced increased financial hardship, with historic clubs at threat. Premiership side Neath RFC had received a now-resolved winding up petition from HM Revenue and Customs, while Championship team Pontypool RFC have had to fund-raise from supporters to remain at their ground.

Created by David Moffat in 2003, Welsh rugby follows a region system with a top tier composed of four club regions. This arrangement has however faced a number of funding issues in recent years. The regions currently operate on a 2009 Participation Agreement which expires in 2019.

The regions in 2013 protested against a new agreement, as they felt it did not offer any funding commitments or clarity regarding competitions such as the Heineken Cup. The Union retorted that funding would increase, but that regions would need to commit to the framework or risk losing their revenue streams.

== Cultural impact ==
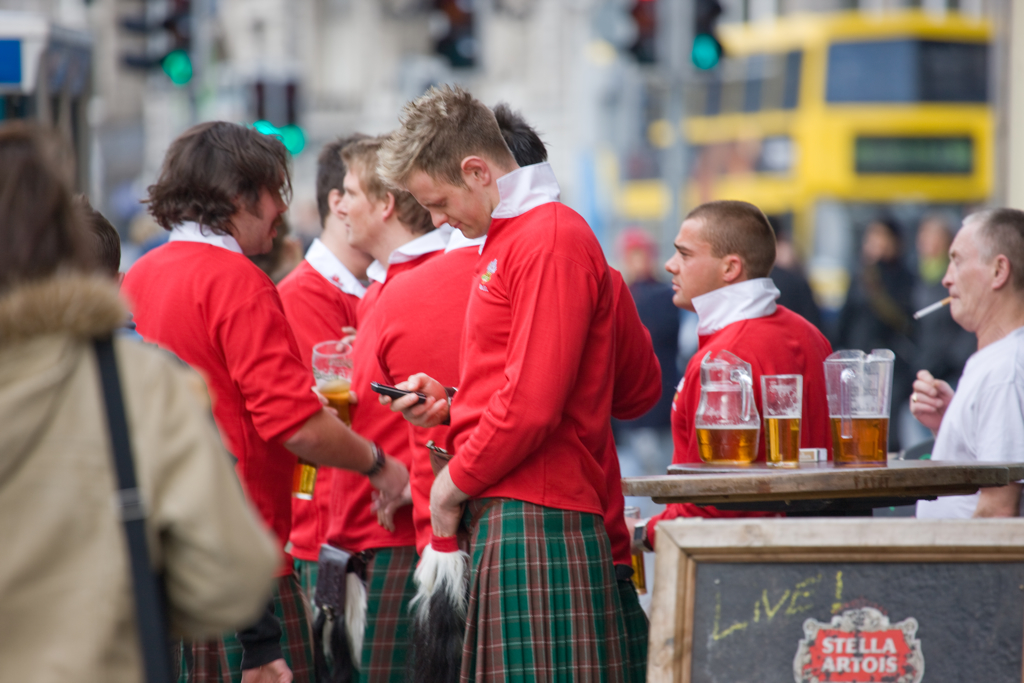
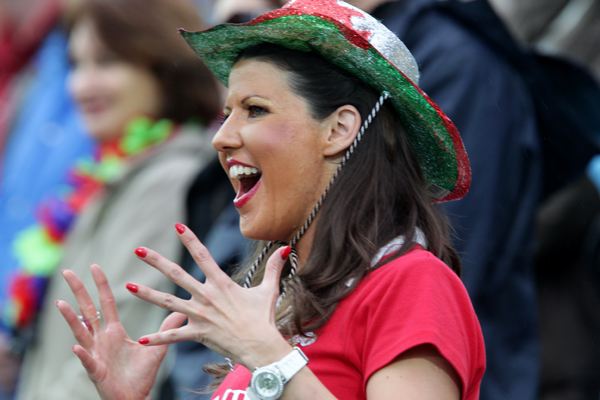
Welsh Rugby Supporters in Dublin during the 2008 Six Nations Championship (left) and a Welsh rugby union fan at the 2011 Rugby World Cup in New Zealand (right)

Rugby union has a particular hold on the national psyche of Wales, especially the Six Nations tournament. The first proof of Wales as a nation embracing the sport of rugby union is reflected in the rapid growth of rugby union clubs in the late 19th century. Within a period of 25 years, from 1875 to 1900, most towns and villages in South Wales were represented by at least one team, though it would take until the 1930s for the North of Wales to set up their own leagues.

Although difficult to prove popularity, two events that took place early in the history of Welsh rugby illustrate its growing influence on the people of Wales. The first was the Gould Affair, when a testimonial fund was set up for Welsh international Arthur Gould, instigated by a local newspaper. From an initial fund of one shilling the public response saw the amount reach into hundreds of pounds, mainly from working-class families with little spare money. The second incident was during the Tonypandy Riot of 1910, when the striking coalminers attacked the shops and premises in the town centre. 80 police officers and 500 civilians were injured and one person died. Over 60 establishments were attacked and looted, with only two buildings avoiding damage. One was a jewelers which had roller shutters, the other was the chemist shop owned by Willie Llewellyn, which despite the chaos of the events was spared due to his services to Wales on the playing field.

For the match against Scotland in 2005, 40,000 Welsh people went to Edinburgh to watch the game. Over 10,000 gathered on "Henson Hill" to watch a big screen of Wales v. Ireland that gave Wales its first Grand Slam since 1978. The result was greeted well amongst fans and was even used to explain a sudden economic surge.

Since 2013, the Millennium Stadium hosts the Judgement Day, a double-header fixture of the four Pro12 teams. The first two editions had over 30,000 spectators. The 2015 edition had 52,762 spectators, the highest in the history of the league.

The choral tradition of Wales manifests itself at rugby games in singing. Popular songs among the fans are 'Delilah' by Tom Jones, 'Cwm Rhondda' and 'Calon Lan' and in part replace the normal chanting of other Rugby supporters.

=== Statistics ===
According to WR, Wales has 239 rugby union clubs; 2321 referees; 28,702 pre-teen male players; 21,371 teen male players; 19,000 senior male players (total male players 69,073) as well as 1,000 teen female players; 1,056 senior female players (total female players 2,056).

=== Demographics ===
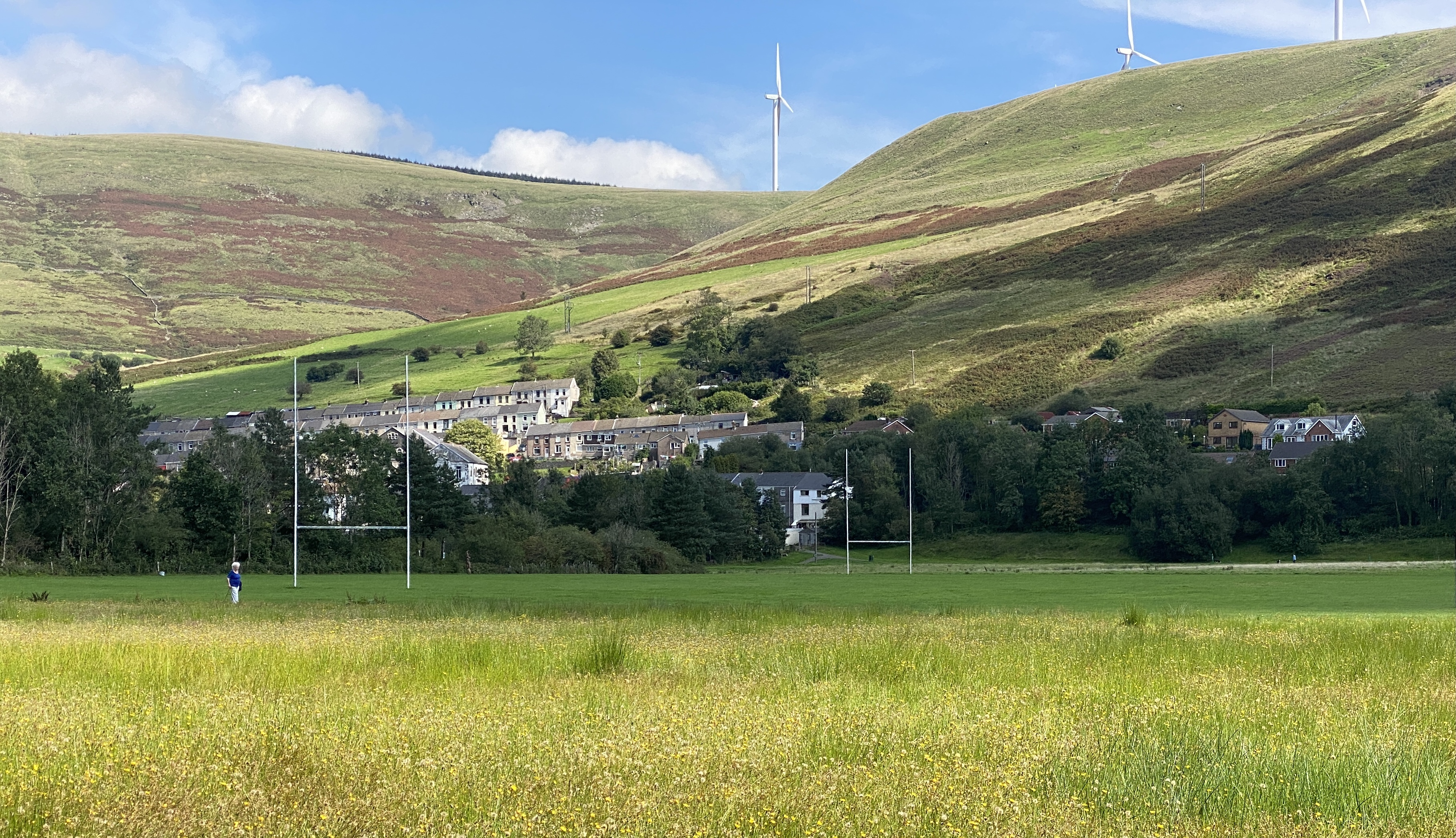
A rugby pitch in the Ogmore Valley. Rugby has often been seen as a central to the culture and daily life in the South Wales Valleys

Whereas in England, rugby union and rugby league fractured into two separate sports over the issue of money, Wales for the most part stayed loyal to the union game. In 1977 Phil Bennett's pre-match captains talk before facing England reflected the strength of feeling many Welsh people had towards the fixture:

Look what these bastards have done to Wales. They've taken our coal, our water, our steel. They buy our homes and live in them for a fortnight every year. What have they given us? Absolutely nothing. We've been exploited, raped, controlled and punished by the English — and that's who you are playing this afternoon.

The South Wales valleys produced so many quality number tens that it was often referred to as 'The Outside Half Factory' immortalised in a song by Max Boyce. Boyce's humour refers to rugby union very often and he has written many songs about the trials and tribulations of following the game as a fan e.g. 'Asso Asso Yogoshi', 'The Scottish Trip', 'Hymns and Arias'.

== See also ==
- Rugby union in the British Isles
- History of rugby union
- Welsh Rugby Union
  - Wales national rugby union team
  - Wales national rugby sevens team
  - Welsh rugby union system
- United Rugby Championship
  - Cardiff Rugby
  - Dragons
  - Ospreys
  - Scarlets
  - Celtic Warriors
- WRU National Leagues
  - Welsh Premier Division
  - WRU Challenge Cup
  - Welsh Championship
- List of Welsh Rugby Union Clubs
- Welsh Rugby Players Association
- Rugby league in Wales

== Bibliography ==
- Goodwin, Terry (1984). The International Rugby Championship 1883-1983. Glasgow: Willow Books. ISBN 0-00-218060-X.
- Morgan, Prys (1988). Glamorgan County History, Volume VI, Glamorgan Society 1780 to 1980. Cardiff: University of Wales Press.
- Richards, Huw A Game for Hooligans: The History of Rugby Union (Mainstream Publishing, Edinburgh, 2007, ISBN 978-1-84596-255-5)
- Smith, David; Williams, Gareth (1980). Fields of Praise: The Official History of The Welsh Rugby Union. Cardiff: University of Wales Press. ISBN 0-7083-0766-3.
- Thomas, Wayne (1979). A Century of Welsh Rugby Players. Ansells Ltd.
