= Super Rygbi Cymru =

Welsh rugby union competition

- Sport: Rugby union
- Founded: 2024; 2 years ago
- First season: 2024–25
- Organising body: Welsh Rugby Union
- No. of teams: 10
- Country: Wales
- Most recent champion: Llandovery (2025–26)
- Most titles: Newport, Llandovery (1 title each)
- Broadcasters: S4C; YouTube
- Level on pyramid: 2 (Note: Super Rygbi Cymru is the highest-level of rugby union played exclusively in Wales. However four Welsh teams play in the trans-national United Rugby Championship (URC), which sits above the Super Rygbi Cymru.)
- Domestic cups: SRC Challenge Shield; SRC Cup
- Related competitions: United Rugby Championship; Welsh Premiership
- Website: community.wru.wales

The Super Rygbi Cymru (SRC; English: Super Rugby Wales) is a semi-professional rugby union competition in Wales, organised by the Welsh Rugby Union (WRU). Launched in 2024, it is the second-highest level of rugby in the country, behind the Welsh regions in the United Rugby Championship (URC).

== Background ==
In early 2023 it was revealed that the Welsh Rugby Union (WRU) had devised initial plans for an "elite" eight-team league to sit between the professional regions and the community level, with the aim of "bridging the gap" between the semi-professional and the professional game in Wales. Senior WRU officials are reported to have presented the idea to club representatives in a private meeting at Millennium Stadium in Cardiff on 14 March 2023. WalesOnline later reported that discussions about a new league creation have dated back to 2016. The initial proposal was for each Welsh region (Cardiff, Dragons, Ospreys, Scarlets) to nominate one club from their pathway, and would be joined by Rygbi Gogledd Cymru from North Wales, and the three remaining places to be filled by Welsh Premiership clubs. The WRU later made a compromise to have ten clubs rather than the initially planned eight. Each team that was to enter the competition would have to be partnered with one of the four regions, and would receive £110,000 (later lowered to £105,000) in funding by the WRU on the assurance they have a viable business model.

By August 2023 the new ten-team competition was confirmed after receiving the approval of various Welsh rugby stakeholders to replace the Welsh Premiership under the placeholder: Elite Domestic Competition (EDC). The EDC's first season was set for 2024–25 and would have no promotion or relegation. In October 2023 it was confirmed that the Welsh regions would have control over key decisions (like appointing a Director of Rugby) and the league would have a £150,000 starting salary cap. Across late 2023 and early 2024, the EDC invited applications for three-year licenses to join the new league. The EDC reportedly received ten submissions from different Premiership clubs. Cardiff, Merthyr and Pontypridd all rejected the invitation to join, arguing that fewer home games in the EDC compared to the Premiership would cut revenue. They also questioned the business logic of a winter break and a proposed cup competition during the Six Nations Championship. Cardiff later reversed on their opposition to the invite and submitted an application.

By May 2024 the competition format, trophies and fixtures had been announced, alongside the official name: Super Rygbi Cymru (SRC). The inaugural season began in September 2024 and included eighteen regular season rounds with a cup competition (SRC Cup) contested during the 2025 Six Nations Championship (January–March) before finishing in May 2025 with a play-offs elimination to conclude the season champions. Newport won the first Super Rygbi Cymru title, defeating Ebbw Vale 27–18 at Eugene Cross Park.

== Clubs ==
Locations of the Super Rygbi Cymru clubs

Club	Region affiliate	Established	Venue	Location
Aberavon	Ospreys	1876; 150 years ago	Talbot Athletic Ground	Port Talbot, Neath Port Talbot
Bridgend Ravens	Ospreys	1878; 148 years ago	Brewery Field	Bridgend, Bridgend County Borough
Cardiff	Cardiff Rugby	1876; 150 years ago	Cardiff Arms Park	Cardiff City Centre, Cardiff
Carmarthen Quins	Scarlets	1875; 151 years ago	Carmarthen Park	Carmarthen, Carmarthenshire
Ebbw Vale	Dragons	1879; 147 years ago	Eugene Cross Park	Ebbw Vale, Blaenau Gwent
Llandovery	Scarlets	1878; 148 years ago	Church Bank Playing Fields	Llandovery, Carmarthenshire
Newport	Dragons	1874; 152 years ago	Newport Stadium	Lliswerry, Newport
Pontypool	Dragons	1868; 158 years ago	Pontypool Park	Pontypool, Torfaen
RGC 1404	(Note: RGC 1404 operate within the regional area of Scarlets, but represent a coming together of a number of North Wales clubs; in effect it is the regional club for North Wales.)	2008; 18 years ago	Eirias Stadium	Colwyn Bay, Conwy County Borough
Swansea	Ospreys	1872; 154 years ago	St Helen's Rugby and Cricket Ground	Brynmill, Swansea

== Champions ==
=== Finals ===
List of Super Rygbi Cymru finals
Season	Winners	Score	Runners-up	Venue
2024–25	Newport	27–18	Ebbw Vale	Eugene Cross Park
2025–26	Llandovery	27–10	Ebbw Vale	Eugene Cross Park

== Cups ==
=== SRC Challenge Shield ===
Upon the announcement of the 2024–25 Super Rygbi Cymru format and fixtures, the introduction of the SRC Challenge Shield was revealed. The SRC Challenge Shield is a challenger trophy in which the holder attempts to defend the shield during every home game of the season, similar to the Ranfurly Shield in New Zealand's National Provincial Championship (NPC).

Going into the inaugural season, Llandovery were awarded holders of the Challenge Shield as they had won the 2024 Premiership Cup and went into the 2024–25 season with an 18-match home win streak. In the first contest for the shield, Ebbw Vale defeated Llandovery 31–28.

SRC Challenge Shield holders
Season	Holder	Date	Defends
2024–25	Llandovery	27 April 2024	0
2024–25	Ebbw Vale	5 October 2024	7
2025–26	Ebbw Vale	5 October 2024	2

=== SRC Cup ===
The SRC Cup, or Super Rygbi Cymru Cup, is an annual domestic knockout cup competition played during the Super Rygbi Cymru season over the Six Nations Championship period. The first SRC Cup took place between January and March 2025, with the ten Super Rygbi Cymru teams being divided into two pools of five. Each team play two home and two away games. The winners of each pool will play-off in the Cup Final. The inaugural SRC Cup was won by Llandovery. They defeated Ebbw Vale in the final 39–7.

SRC Cup winners
Season	Winner	Score	Runners-up
2024–25	Llandovery	39–7	Ebbw Vale
2025–26	Newport	28–25	Llandovery
