= Welsh rugby union system =

Sports league system

The Welsh rugby union system, or WRU National League system, refers to the hierarchically interconnected league system for rugby union in Wales that in the 2024–25 season consisted of 30 leagues in up to 298 teams. Four Welsh rugby teams sit above the league system as participants in the United Rugby Championship (URC), a professional trans-national rugby union league featuring several teams from Ireland, Wales, Scotland, Italy, and South Africa. The four professional Welsh teams also compete in European cup competitions such as the European Rugby Champions Cup and the EPCR Challenge Cup.

== 2021–22 league system ==
Level	League(s)/Division(s)				
1	Welsh Premiership; 12 clubs - 1 relegation				
2	Welsh Championship; 14 clubs - 1 promotion, 4 relegations				
3	WRU Division 1 East; 12 clubs - 1 qualification for promotion finals and 2 relegations	WRU Division 1 Central East; 12 clubs - 1 qualification for promotion finals and 2 relegations	WRU Division 1 West; 12 clubs - 1 qualification for promotion finals and 2 relegations	WRU Division 1 Central West; 12 clubs - 1 qualification for promotion finals and 2 relegations	WRU Division 1 North; 12 clubs - No promotion and 2 relegations
4	WRU Division 2 East; 12 clubs - 2 promotions and 2 relegations	WRU Division 2 Central East; 12 clubs - 2 promotions and 2 relegations	WRU Division 2 West; 12 clubs - 2 promotions and 2 relegations	WRU Division 2 Central West; 12 clubs - 2 promotions and 2 relegations	WRU Division 2 North; 12 clubs - 2 promotions and 2 relegations
5	WRU Division 3 East; 12 clubs - Teams divided into 4 groups 2 promotions after promotion finals	WRU Division 3 Central East; 12 clubs - Teams divided into 3 groups 2 promotions after promotion finals	WRU Division 3 West; 12 clubs - Teams divided into 2 groups 2 promotions after promotion finals	WRU Division 3 Central West; 12 clubs - Teams divided into 3 groups 2 promotions after promotion finals	WRU Division 3 North; 12 clubs - 1 group, 2 promotions

== 2013–14 league system ==
Level	League(s)/Division(s)				
1	Welsh Premier Division; 20 clubs – 3 relegations				
2	Welsh Championship; 24 clubs – 3 promotions, 3 relegations				
3	WRU Division One East; 24 clubs – 2 promotions, 4 relegations		WRU Division One West; 24 clubs – 2 promotions, 4 relegations		WRU Division One North; 24 clubs – 2 promotions, 4 relegations
4	WRU Division Two East; 24 clubs – 2 promotions, 4 relegations		WRU Division Two North; 24 clubs – 2 promotions, 4 relegations		WRU Division Two West; 24 clubs – 2 promotions, 4 relegations
5	WRU Division Three East; 22 clubs – 2p, 2r	WRU Division Three North; 22 clubs – 2p, 2r	WRU Division Three South East; 22 clubs – 2p, 2r	WRU Division Three South West; 22 clubs – 2p, 2r	WRU Division Three West; 24 clubs – 2p, 3r
6	WRU Division Four East; 22 clubs – 2p, 2r	WRU Division Four South East; 22 clubs – 2p, 2r	WRU Division Four South West; 22 clubs – 2p, 2r	WRU Division Four West; 22 clubs – 2p, 2r	
7	WRU Division Five East; 22 clubs – 2p, 2r	WRU Division Five South Central; 22 clubs – 2p, 2r	WRU Division Five South East; 22 clubs – 2p, 2r	WRU Division Five South West; 22 clubs – 2p, 2r	WRU Division Five West; 24 clubs – 2p, 3r
8	WRU Division Six Central; 22 clubs – 2p, 2r	WRU Division Six East; 22 clubs – 2p, 2r	WRU Division Six South East; 22 clubs – 2p, 2r	WRU Division Six West; 22 clubs – 2p, 2r	

== See also ==
- Rugby union in Wales
