= Llandovery RFC =

Welsh rugby union club, based in Llandovery

- Full name: Llandovery Rugby Football Club
- Nickname: The Drovers
- Founded: 1878; 148 years ago
- Location: Llandovery, Wales
- Ground: Church Bank Playing Fields (Capacity: 3,000)
- Chairman: Peter Rees
- Coach: Euros Evans
- Captain: Joe Powell
- League: Super Rygbi Cymru
- 2025–2026: Super Rygbi Cymru, 4th (won final)

Llandovery RFC (Welsh: Clwb Rygbi Llanymddyfri) is a Welsh rugby union club based in Llandovery, Carmarthenshire, Wales. The club is an inaugural member of the Welsh Rugby Union, currently play in the Super Rygbi Cymru and is a feeder club for the Scarlets, a United Rugby Championship club. Llandovery won the Premier Division during the 2022–23 season, defeating reigning champions Cardiff RFC in the final.

== Early history ==
Prior to 1878 written evidence exists of a Llandovery rugby team, though in these reports it is not clear if this was a town or college team. On 22 February 1878 a report in the Carmarthen Journal refers to a rugby game between 'Llandovery' and other local teams but these were specifically named as college teams while Llandovery was not. In 1879 Llandovery College, played their first recognised official match against Christ College, Brecon. This was a college and not a town side as the match report indicated it was the first time the two schools had met. are nowadays recognised as an inaugural member of the Welsh Rugby Union at a meeting held at the on 12 March 1881 in the Castle Hotel, Neath. It is not certain however whether C. P. Lewis, a master at the college was representing the town as well as the college. In 1894, Llandovery was one of ten clubs who became affiliated to the Welsh Rugby Union, but gave up this status in 1910.

== Inter-war period ==
Rugby was not played in Llandovery from 1914 to 1919, during the Great War, but commenced again in 1920 and the club continued until 1935, but due to a lack of fixtures ceased to function in that year.

== Post World War II ==
In November 1948 Llandovery RFC officially reformed, and began laying down the foundations that would give it future stability. Llandovery RFC moved their club headquarters to the White Hall and in 1956 the town's Improvement Committee purchased Barlow's Field which was levelled and reseeded. In the subsequent two years improvements included the building of changing rooms. In 1956 Llandovery RFC reapplied for membership to the WRU which was granted in 1957.

The nickname The Drovers was coined by rugby journalist Huw S Thomas.

Llandovery's gradual rise from the lower divisions of the West Wales Rugby Union to Welsh Premiership status over the last 40 years has owed much to the sound methods and tactical acumen of a number of coaches.

Honour is due to "Jock Watkins" – the coach when Llandovery beat Pontypridd in the WRU Cup back in 1984 - Stan Liptrot, Geri Davies, Iestyn Thomas, Geraint Williams, ex-Wales flanker Rob Appleyard, Lyndon Lewis and latterly Euros Evans.

Watkins, a former Pontypridd hooker coached the defeat of his old club in the 1984 Schweppes Cup, Liptrot brought professionalism and ideas from his time as England U21 coach and Geri Davies made the pack into a fighting but disciplined unit, befitting of a high ranking Army officer

Williams came with attacking ideas from his time at Newbridge, Appleyard introduced methods of preparation and coaching and Lewis used his time as a teacher in Swansea to bring in influential players such as James Garland and Richard Brooks. But other schoolmasters in Iestyn Thomas and Euros Evans – both hookers - stand out, because they both won the WRU Cup as coaches and their significant influence in persuading so many of their former pupils to join the club.

This was crucial once the game went professional in 1995 after which clubs – even lower league clubs - started to sign players from outside their own immediate area.

Where once many clubs relied on home produced players, educated at local schools, they now swept the net wider in an effort to attract talented players and climb up the new league structures introduced in 1990.

Llandovery's success in qualifying for the new Heineken Leagues in 1990 was attributed largely to the contributions of former pupils of Ysgol Pantycelyn, a group of players who came together at the club during that period.

That success, strange enough, was down not as much to the school but to the coaching of Llandovery RFC pair of Bernard Jones and Davy George Davies who had attended WRU coaching courses under the crusading WRU Coaching Organiser Ray Williams.

It was they who formed an U15 side in 1972 - the first age group side in the club's history - out of which grew a Youth side that produced some fine players through the 1970s and 1980s.

The club's proudest moment in that period was the defeat of Pontypridd in the 1984 Schweppes Cup second round with a side of players almost all born and bred in the Llandovery area, coached by Jock Watkins.

But it was the cohort of players active in the late 1980s and early 1990s that were instrumental in getting the club into the Heineken League structure in 1990.

Llandovery clinched promotion from Section A of the West Wales League in 1990 by defeating Felinfoel 16–7 with a team that was almost all home grown. In those defining years of the late 1980s and early 1990s the likes of Hywel Jones, Arwel Rowlands, Geraint and Carwyn Williams, Chris and Adrian Davies, Huw Morgans, Wyn and Alan Morgan, Arwel Evans, Wyn Williams, Alun Thomas, Emyr James, Eirian Jones, Carwyn Davies, Dai Giles and Elfyn Jenkins – alongside others - were all former Pantycelyn pupils and former Llandovery Youth products.

These players were supplemented by a scattering of Old Llandoverians such as Huw Thomas and Nigel Clake and others who were employed locally, such as local Police Officer Dai "Book" Thomas and surveyor Phil "The Beast" Davies.

For over a decade a mixture of local men with players from further afield such as John Westgarth, Herman Bosman and Neil Clapham, along with on loan Scarlets players, kept the Drovers in position to qualify for the newly formed semi-pro Welsh Premier Division in 2003.

Llandovery had frequent struggles to keep in the top division and in 2007 they were only saved from relegation because of the technicalities of league criteria eligibility.

Ex-London Welsh and Harlequins hooker Thomas coached the Drovers to beat Cardiff 20–18 in the 2017 WRU Cup Final thanks to a last gasp try from prop Endaf Howells.

Thomas, an Old Llandoverian, had two spells coaching at Llandovery College 1990-1998 and 2008-2018 and from that time a score of players followed him to Church Bank between 2000 and 2008

Not long out of school, the likes of Gareth Thomas, Jeremy Griffiths, Wayne Beynon, Jamie Roberts, Dan Williams, Simon Emms, Cerith Rees, Simon Jenkins, Rhodri Davies and Gethin Watts played full seasons under Thomas.

Tom Walker and Loan Davies, too, were in the side that won the 2007 Cup, alongside Andy Powell; who played 18 games for the Drovers 2000-2001, before moving on to the Lions.

Director of Sport at Coleg Sir Gar, Euros Evans, built his college side up to be a capable team within Wales, facing several colleges and schools within England and Wales, including: Neath College, Swansea College, Llandovery College, Colston's and Millfield. The Llanelli-based college also won the Rosslyn Park National Open 7s in 2012 when Josh Adams helped them to become only the fifth ever Welsh school or college to take the world's biggest 7s tournament in 73 years.

They followed in the famous footsteps of Llanelli GS, Llandovery College, St Cyre's CS Penarth and Neath College.

Ever since Evans joined the Llandovery RFC coaching team in 2010 - first as an assistant to Lyndon Lewis and then Head Coach in 2015 - a platoon of players followed him to Church Bank, to the huge benefit of the East Carmarthenshire club.

More than 30 of Evans’s former players later contributed to the development of the Drovers in the semi-professional Premiership. Evans was known for emphasizing analytical preparation and the use of an "A-ball pod" system in his coaching approach.

In his five years as head coach the Drovers have finished second, seventh, second, fourth and fourth in the Premiership and also won the WRU Cup in 2016, when the WRU voted him Premiership Coach of the Year. Evans has moulded no fewer than eight hookers into quality operators. Luke Lewis - who captained the 2016 Cup winning side, Ricky Guest, Tom Ball, Matthew Moore, Garan Williams, Ryan Williams, Elgan Lewis and Sam Parry all benefited from the expert Evans touch down at the CSG campus in Llanelli.

In selecting a composite XV of players who have been coached by Evans at CSG and who then followed him to Church Bank over a period of 10 years, Evans's influence on Llandovery fortunes in the Premiership is pronounced.

Llandovery were named Welsh Premiership champions on 21 May 2023, defeating Cardiff at the Cardiff Arms Park in the final, 24–8.

== Club honours ==
- Welsh Premier Division: 2022–23, 2023–24, 2025–26
- Welsh Cup: 2006–07, 2015–16, 2023–24
- Super Rygbi Cymru Cup: 2024–25
- National Sevens : 2012–13, 2013–14, 2014–15, 2015–16, 2016–17

== Current squad ==
Llandovery RFC Squad 2025-26

Llandovery RFC squad
**Props**: (Wales) Thomas Curry; (Italy) Dino Dallavalle*; (Wales) Alfie Fecci-Evans; (Wales) Llyr Green; (Wales) Jamie Hughes; (Wales) Llyr James; (Wales) Joshua Morse^; (Wales) **Harri O'Connor**^; (Wales) Tom Phillips^; (Wales) Jac Pritchard^; (Wales) Tom Pritchard; (Wales) Teifi Thomas; (Wales) Liam Tobias; (Wales) Luke Tucker; (Wales) Berian Watkins; **Hookers**: (Wales) Sion Jones; (Wales) Cameron Lewis; (Wales) Finn Thomas; (Wales) Harry Thomas^; **Locks**: (Wales) Dylan Alford^; (Wales) Osian Davies; (Wales) Griff Evans; (Wales) Will Evans^; (Wales) Dan Gemine; (Wales) Harry Holden; (Wales) Cai Howell; (Wales) Kai Jones^; (Wales) Dom Kossuth^; (Wales) Chris Long	**Back row**: (Wales) Iwan Coyle; (Wales) Cerith Davies; (Wales) Jordan Evans; (Wales) Dylan Lewis; (Wales) Joseff Powell; (Wales) Max Rodda-Lodder; (Wales) Evan Sheldon; (Wales) Tiaan Sparrow^; (Wales) Stuart Worrall; **Scrum-halves**: (Wales) Aron Hemmings; (Wales) George McDonald; (Wales) Noah Potter; (Wales) Lee Rees (c); (Wales) Lucca Setaro; **Fly-halves**: (Wales) Rhun Davies; (Wales) Ioan Hughes; (Wales) Steffan Jac Jones^; (Wales) Jack Maynard; (Wales) Samuel Potter	**Centres**: (Wales) Corey Baldwin; (Wales) Tyler Davies; (Wales) Harri Doel; (Wales) Rhodri Jones; (Wales) Macs Page^; (Wales) Ioan Thomas; (Wales) Wil Thomas; (Wales) **Adam Warren**; (Wales) Gryff Watkins^; **Wings**: (Wales) Kian Abraham; (Wales) Ned Bennett; (Wales) Ben Evans; (Wales) Fraser Gregory; (Wales) Llien Morgan; (Wales) Aaron Warren; **Fullbacks**: (Wales) Jac Davies^; (Wales) Cai Evans; (Wales) Tiaan Evans; (Wales) Osian Herbert; (Wales) Harri Morgan
(c) denotes the team captain, **Bold** denotes internationally capped players.^{*} denotes players qualified to play for Wales on residency or dual nationality.^ denotes players drafted from Scarlets.

== Notable former players ==
See also Category:Llandovery RFC players

- (Wales) Simon Emms
- (Wales) Rhodri Gomer-Davies
- (Wales) Dafydd Jones
- (Wales) Mark Jones
- (Wales) Rhodri Jones
- (Wales) Wyn Jones
- (Wales) George North
- (Wales) Andy Powell
- (Wales) Tal Selley
- (Canada) Jamie Cudmore
- (Ireland) Tadhg Beirne
- (South Africa) Marc Desvaux de Marigny
