= RGC 1404 =

Welsh rugby union club, based in Colwyn Bay

(Wales) RGC 1404
- Full name: Rygbi Gogledd Cymru 1404
- Union: WRU
- Nickname: Gogs
- Founded: 2008; 18 years ago
- Location: Colwyn Bay, Wales
- Ground: Eirias Stadium (Capacity: 6,080)
- Director of Rugby: Josh Leach
- Coach: Jon Callard
- Captain: Danny Cross
- League: Super Rygbi Cymru
- 2024–25: Super Rygbi Cymru, 8th
1st kit	2nd kit

First match
- Gilfach Goch 19–42 RGC 1404

Largest win
- RGC 1404 127–0 Tredegar

Largest defeat
- RGC 1404 19–88 Wales

Official website
- northwalesrugby.wales

RGC 1404 (Rygbi Gogledd Cymru 1404), formerly "Gogledd Cymru" (Welsh: [ˈgɔglɛð ˈkəmrɨ], "North Wales"), is a rugby union team founded in 2008 and based in Colwyn Bay, Conwy. They currently play in the Super Rygbi Cymru; after winning Division 1 East at the first attempt in 2012–13, they spent three seasons in the Welsh Championship before earning promotion to the Premier Division in 2015–16. They finished fourth in their first season in the top flight, but also won the WRU Challenge Cup for the first time. They play at Eirias Stadium, which has a capacity of just over 6,000.

== History ==
Although an amateur North Wales rugby representative side had existed for over 50 years, Gogledd Cymru was established by the North Wales Rugby Council, in February 2007, in response to the WRU approved strategic plan for the development of rugby union in the region. This aimed to achieve a north Wales side playing in the Welsh Premier Division by 2010–11 In their first season, Gogledd Cymru reached the final of the Welsh Counties Cup.

=== 2008–2011 ===
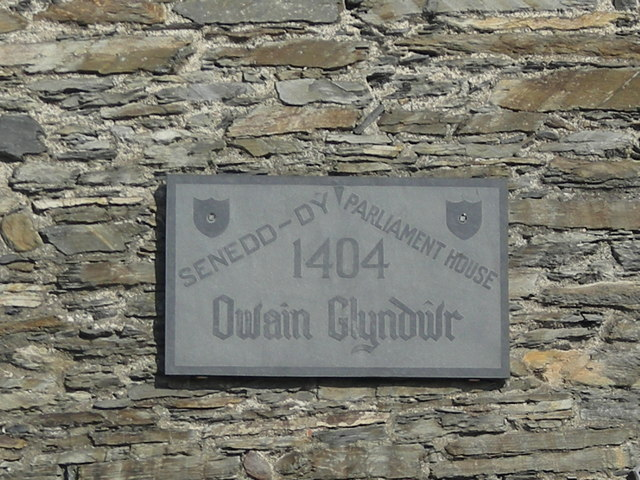
A plaque at Machynlleth commemorates Owain Glyndŵr's 1404 parliament

In December 2008, it was announced that the Eirias Stadium in Colwyn Bay was to be the home ground for Gogledd Cymru.

In January 2010, the team was renamed RGC 1404: RGC is an initialism for Rygbi Gogledd Cymru (North Wales Rugby), and 1404 reflects the year that Owain Glyndŵr became Prince of Wales.

=== 2012–2013 ===
For the 2012–13 season, the team were entered into WRU Division One East, playing a full season of games against teams from South East Wales. RGC finished the season at the top of the table, earning promotion to the Welsh Championship for 2013–14.

=== 2013–2014 ===
RGC's first season in the Welsh Championship saw them spend much of the season in second place to a dominant Ebbw Vale only to drop to third in the last game by losing to Cardiff Met 36–24. RGC players Afon Bagshaw, Harri Evans and Ollie Cracknell were selected and played in the Wales side for the 2014 U20 Six Nations, with the home games hosted at RGC's Eirias Stadium.

== Notable former players ==
See Category:RGC 1404 players

On 6 November 2021, hooker Bradley Roberts became the first former RGC 1404 player to win a senior cap for Wales, though previously both Olly Cracknell and Rhun Williams had been named in senior Wales squads, and James Lang had been capped by Scotland.

Several other players who played senior rugby for RGC 1404 have gone on to play top level European professional rugby in the Pro 14 or English Premiership, and a number of players have played for Wales at U20 level whilst with RGC.

== Coaching staff ==
=== Head coaches ===
Name	Tenure
(Wales) Jon Aby	2007–2009
(Wales) Clive Griffiths	2009–2011
(Wales) Chris Horsman	2012–2014
(England) Damian McGrath	2012–2014
(Wales) Phil Davies	2015–2016
(Wales) Mark Jones	2016–2019
(Wales) Matthew Silva (coach)	2019 - 2020
(Wales) Ceri Jones	2021–2024
(Wales) Josh Leach	2024–2025
(England) Jon Callard	2025 - present

== Results and statistics ==
=== WRU Leagues ===
Season	Division	Played	Won	Drawn	Lost	PF	PA	PD	TF	TA	Try BP	Losing BP	Points	Position
2012–13	Div 1 East	22	19	0	3	801	277	+524	119	30	15	2	93	1st
2013–14	Championship	26	17	0	9	745	419	+324	113	49	13	2	83	3rd
2014–15	Championship	26	15	0	11	848	434	+414	125	55	16	7	83	4th
2015–16	Championship	26	19	0	7	928	460	+468	133	55	15	5	96	4th
2016–17	Premiership	15	10	1	4	429	281	+148	52	32	5	1	48	4th
2016–17	Premiership Tier 1	7	4	0	3	176	162	+14	22	17	3	1	20	4th
2017–18	Premiership (West)	14	11	1	2	375	294	+81	42	41	5	1	52	1st
2017–18	Premiership (Phase 2)	15	9	1	5	513	328	+185	68	39	8	4	58	4th
2018–19	Premiership	30	14	1	15	859	650	+209	121	83	16	11	85	8th
2019–20	Premiership	17	8	1	8	409	381	+28	54	50	5	4	43	7th
The 2019–20 season was cancelled early due to the COVID-19 pandemic.
2021–22	Premiership	11	6	0	5	286	244	+42	38	34	6	1	31	4th
2022–23	Premiership	22	11	0	11	576	476	+100	74	58	9	5	58	7th
2023–24	Premiership	24	7	0	17	518	651	−133	66	89	6	7	41	11th

== Honours ==
- WRU Division One East: 2012–13
- WRU National Cup: 2016–17
