= Welsh regional rugby =

Top tier of professional Welsh club rugby

Welsh regional rugby is the top tier of professional Welsh club rugby union and is composed of the Scarlets, Ospreys, Cardiff Rugby and the Dragons which compete in the United Rugby Championship.

The regions were established for the start of the 2003/04 rugby union season. From this date, Wales was represented by a smaller number of regional teams in both the Celtic League and European Cup competitions, where previously the top club sides were entered into them.

== Current regions ==
=== Cardiff Rugby ===
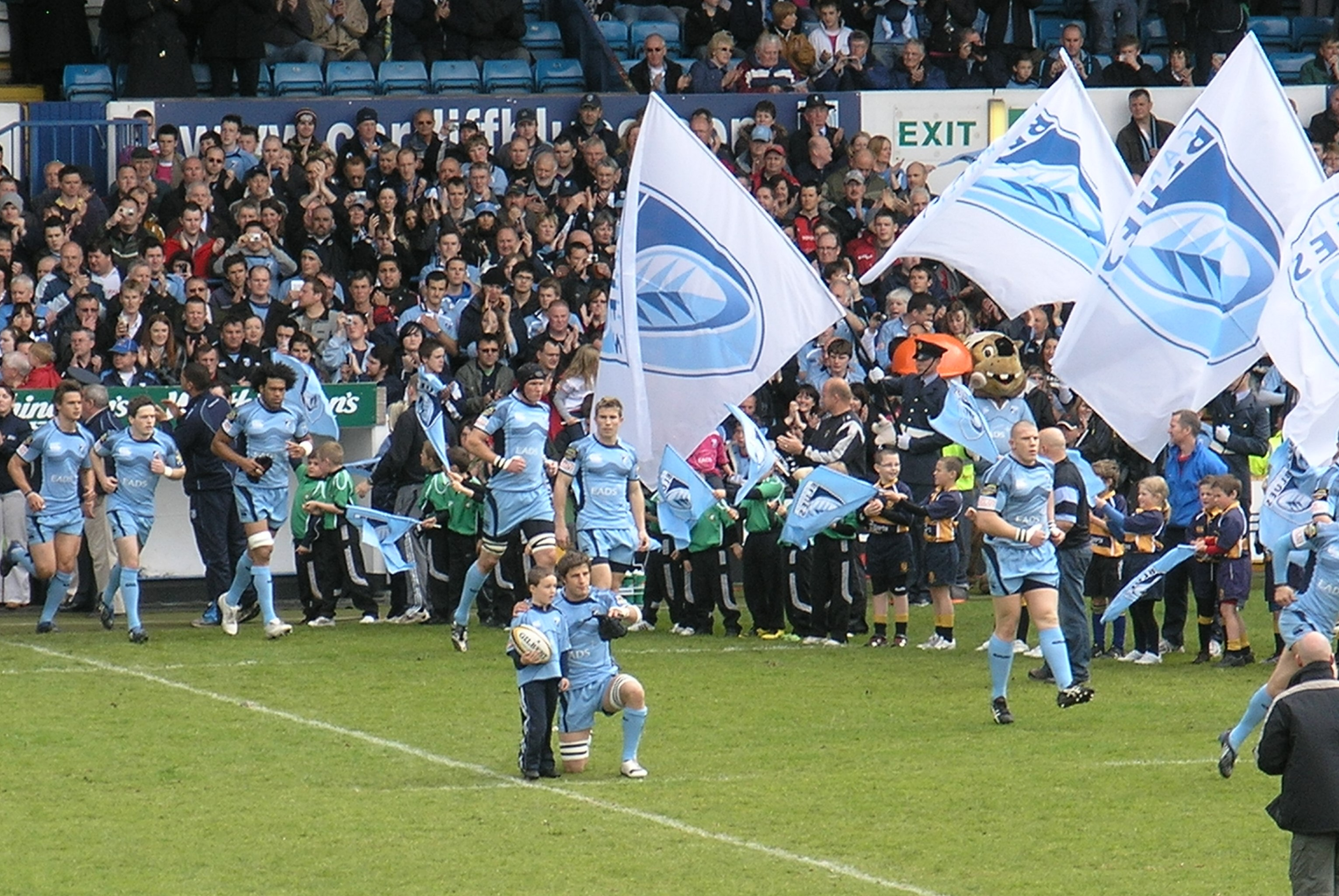
Cardiff Rugby at Cardiff Arms Park

Based in Cardiff, the capital of Wales, Cardiff Rugby (Welsh: Rygbi Caerdydd) play at Cardiff Arms Park and are owned by the Welsh Rugby Union following an administration in 2025. From 2003 to 2021 the club were known as the Cardiff Blues before changing their name to Cardiff Rugby prior to the start of the 2021-22 season.

Cardiff are responsible for developing rugby in the city of Cardiff, Vale of Glamorgan, Rhondda Cynon Taf, Merthyr Tydfil and south Powys. There are 75 associate clubs within this wider Cardiff Rugby region including semi professional Pontypridd RFC, Merthyr RFC and the Cardiff RFC Welsh Premiership side.

Cardiff compete in the United Rugby Championship, which includes teams from Ireland, Scotland, Wales, Italy and South Africa. In addition, Cardiff Blues competed in the Anglo-Welsh Cup and (for the 2017–18 season) the European Rugby Challenge Cup which they won by beating Gloucester in the final 31–30. They previously won the 2008–09 Anglo-Welsh Cup and the 2009–10 European Challenge Cup. In the 2021-22 season, Cardiff competed in the European Champions Cup.

=== Scarlets ===
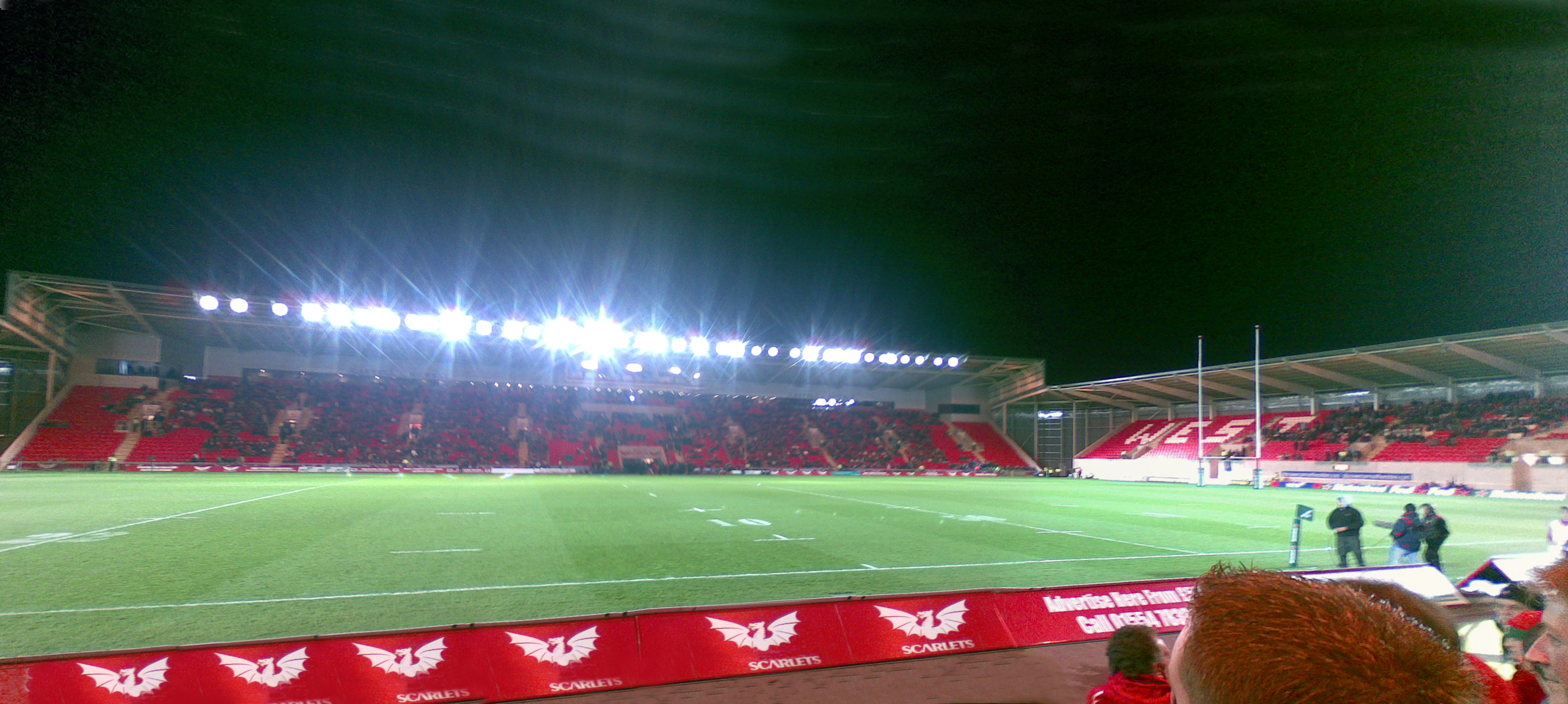
Parc y Scarlets

Their home ground of the Scarlets is the Parc y Scarlets stadium. They play in the United Rugby Championship and the European Rugby Champions Cup (which replaced the Heineken Cup from the 2014–15 season). The club was originally named the Llanelli Scarlets but was renamed at the start of the 2008–09 rugby season.

The Llanelli Scarlets were founded in 2003, as one of the five (now four) regional teams created by the Welsh Rugby Union (WRU). The Scarlets are affiliated with a number of semi-professional and amateur clubs throughout the area, including Welsh Premier Division sides Llanelli RFC, Carmarthen Quins RFC and Llandovery RFC. Through the 2007–08 season, they played most of their games at Stradey Park in Llanelli, but they have also played matches at the Racecourse Ground in Wrexham. The club's new stadium, Parc y Scarlets (English: Scarlets Park), was constructed in nearby Pemberton, and opened in November 2008.

The region has had success both domestically and continentally. They won the United Rugby Championship in the 2003-04 season (then the Celtic League) and in the 2016-17 season (then the Guinness Pro 12). The region has also competed in 2 semi finals in the European Rugby Champions Cup, in 2007 and 2018, the most of any Welsh team since regionalisation.

=== Ospreys ===
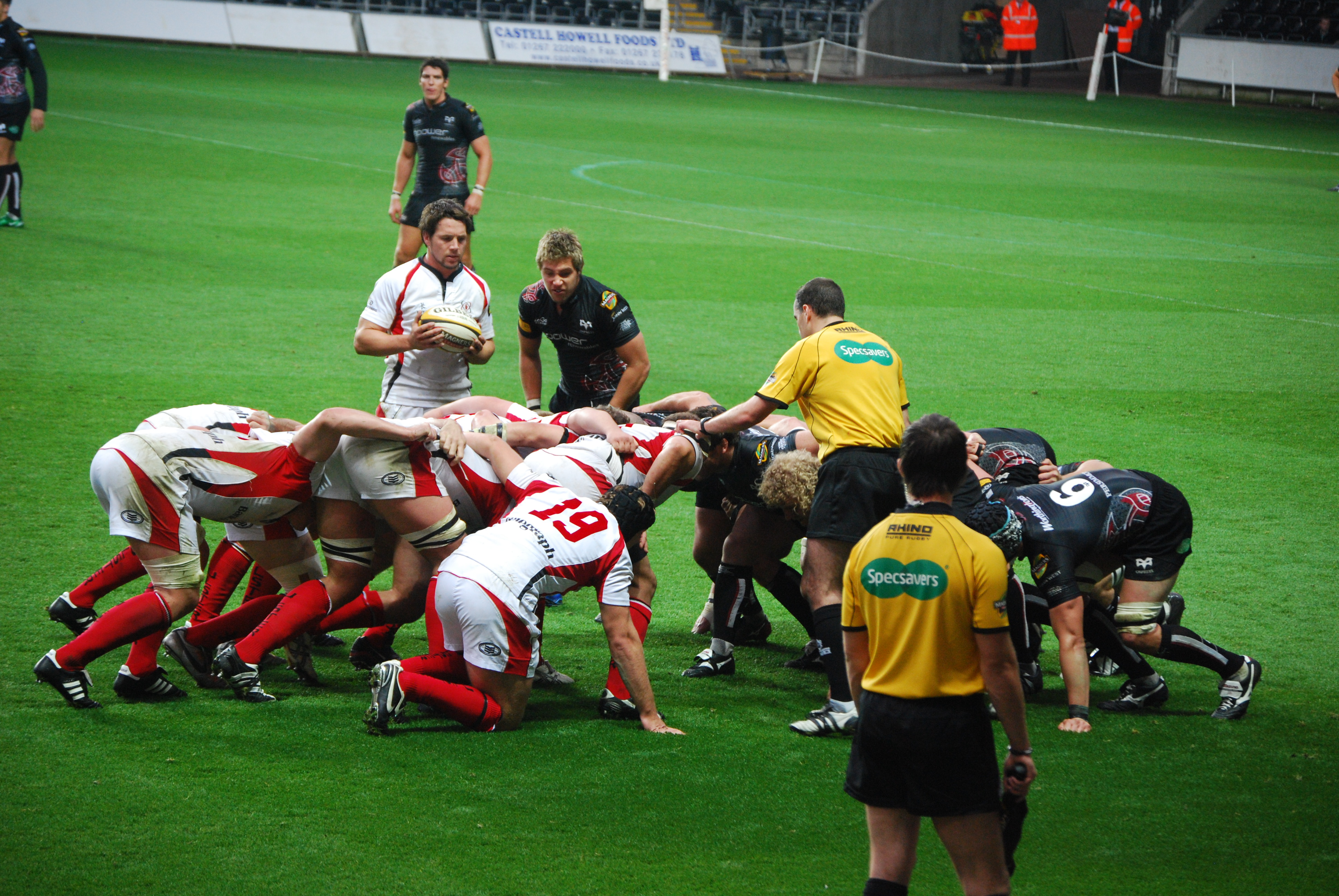
Ospreys, Swansea.com Stadium

The Ospreys (Welsh: Y Gweilch), formerly the Neath-Swansea Ospreys, compete in the United Rugby Championship and the European Rugby Champions Cup. The team formed as a result of Neath RFC and Swansea RFC combining to create a new merged entity, as part of the new regional structure of Welsh rugby, that began in 2003. They are also affiliated with a number of local semi-professional and amateur clubs, including Welsh Premier Division sides Aberavon RFC, Bridgend Ravens, and original founding clubs Neath and Swansea. The regional area represented by the team has widely become known for rugby purposes as 'Ospreylia'.

Their main home ground is the Swansea.com Stadium, Swansea, although some smaller profile games have been played at the Brewery Field, Bridgend. Ospreys currently play in a black home strip, while the away strip is white. The Ospreys logo consists of an image of an Osprey mask.

The Ospreys are the most successful Welsh team in the history of the Celtic League or Pro12 tournament, having won the competition four times. They also became the first and only Welsh regional team to beat a major touring side, defeating Australia 24–16 in 2006.

The Ospreys have expressed an intention to move a new rebuilt stadium at the historic St Helen's Ground in Swansea in 2026.

=== Dragons ===
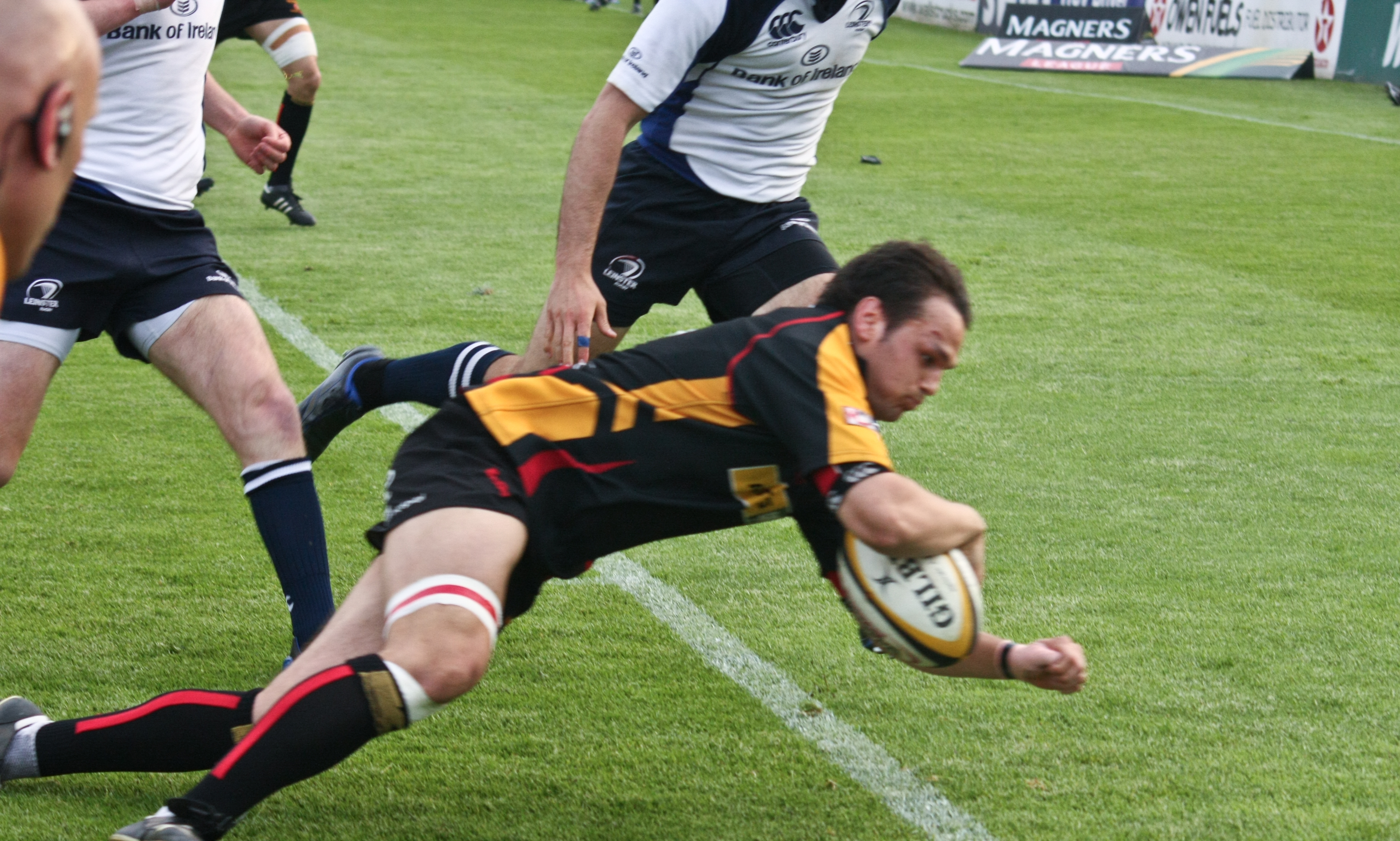
Tryscorer for Dragons RFC

Dragons (Welsh: Dreigiau) are owned a consortium (headed by David Buttress) that bought Rodney Parade and the Dragons from the WRU in July 2023. The Dragons play most of their home games at Rodney Parade, Newport and occasionally at other grounds around the region. They play in the United Rugby Championship and the European Rugby Champions Cup/European Rugby Challenge Cup. The region they represent covers an area of southeast Wales east of Cardiff including Blaenau Gwent, Caerphilly, Monmouthshire, Newport and Torfaen with a total population approaching 600,000 and they are affiliated with a number of semi-professional and amateur clubs throughout the area, including Pontypool RFC, Caerphilly RFC, Cross Keys RFC, Ebbw Vale RFC and Newport RFC.

Formed in 2003 as a result of the introduction of regional rugby union teams in Wales, the team started life with a third-place finish in the 2003–04 Celtic League, and finished fourth the next season; however, the team finished in the bottom three in each of the next four seasons. In 2007, they reached the semi-finals of the European Challenge Cup, losing to French side ASM Clermont Auvergne 46–29. In 2011, they reached the semi-finals of the Anglo-Welsh Cup, losing to Gloucester. They are yet to make the knock-out stage of the European Rugby Champions Cup.

== History ==
=== Before regional rugby ===
Before regions were introduced to rugby union in Wales, there were nine clubs that played in the Welsh Premiership, the top-level of domestic club rugby in Wales. Since 2001, all of the teams also competed in the Celtic League competition, a cross-border competition involving Welsh, Scottish and Irish teams. Five Welsh clubs were also selected to take part in the Heineken Cup competition, which feature clubs from France, England and Italy in addition to the Celtic nations.

Concerns had been raised about the number of clubs playing at the top level, with regard to Wales not producing enough good-quality players to sustain nine clubs. Good quality players who played for clubs that failed to qualify for Heineken Cup rugby missed out on the experience of playing in such a tournament. In addition, the club game in Wales had struggled to cope financially since Rugby Union turned professional in 1995. Clubs struggled for support, with reigning champions Swansea attracting a crowd of just 932 for a home game against Pontypridd in late 2001.

=== Region suggestions ===
A suggestion to move to a regional structure was made by Graham Henry, then coach of the national Wales side, in December 2001 as he had concerns that the current club system was causing harm to the performance of the national team. Prior to joining Wales, Henry had first-hand experience of a regional structure as coach of the Auckland Blues, a regional franchise team in his native New Zealand. Henry's proposal was for the creation of four sides based in West Wales, South East Wales, the South Wales Valleys and Gwent. All players would be under contract to the Welsh Rugby Union, who would decide which players would play for which region.

Henry resigned from his post as Wales coach in February 2002, before any progress had been made with the plans. His replacement, Steve Hansen, also had coaching experience with a regional franchise in New Zealand, the Canterbury Crusaders, and he also advocated the regional structure.

Six of the clubs that made up the Welsh Premiership suggested that they compete in a reduced size Premier League. The proposal of a six club league was agreed with in principle by the WRU management but the WRU membership rejected the proposal.

In September 2002, the WRU and the clubs that made up the Premiership agreed to discuss and decide on a future structure for the game. Two representatives from the clubs and two from the WRU would discuss all possible options, including making modifications to the existing club structure, provincial rugby, franchises, superclubs and regional mergers.

Steve Hansen favoured option was for four regional teams, with 120 of Wales' top players and eight coaches under contract to the WRU, and spread through the teams as the WRU saw fit. At the end of October, David Moffatt was appointed Group Chief Executive of the Welsh Rugby Union, and he was tasked with reducing the debt of the Union.

=== Proposals ===
At a meeting held between the WRU and the eight Premier League clubs on 5 December 2002, Terry Cobner, the WRU director of rugby, and David Moffett outlined plans for a regional system similar to that used by the Irish Rugby Football Union. The only proposal offered to the clubs was for four regional sides, all of which would be under the control of the Welsh Rugby Union with the existing clubs acting as feeder clubs providing their best players to the regions. The locations of the four regions, and the proposed feeder clubs were as follows:

Region's location	Feeder clubs
Stradey Park, Llanelli	Llanelli RFC, Swansea RFC, Neath RFC
Cardiff Arms Park, Cardiff	Cardiff RFC, Bridgend RFC, Pontypridd RFC
Rodney Parade, Newport	Newport RFC, Caerphilly RFC, Ebbw Vale RFC
Racecourse Ground, Wrexham	Fed from all North Wales clubs (initially using players from the south)

The proposal was rejected by the Premier League clubs, who had expected five 'superclubs' to be formed made up of partnerships between existing clubs. Two plans had been drawn up with the partnerships arranged as follows:

Option 1

Partner clubs
Swansea RFC	Llanelli RFC
Pontypridd RFC
Neath RFC	Bridgend RFC
Cardiff RFC	Caerphilly RFC
Newport RFC	Ebbw Vale RFC

Option 2

Partner clubs
Llanelli RFC
Swansea RFC	Neath RFC
Pontypridd RFC	Bridgend RFC
Cardiff RFC	Caerphilly RFC
Newport RFC	Ebbw Vale RFC

The clubs were unable to agree on which plan they wished to submit as their preferred alternative to the WRU's provincial system. Llanelli were keen to stand-alone, citing their previous record in European competition while Neath were reluctant to form a partnership with Swansea, having already agreed in principle to pool resources with Bridgend for European competition.

By the end of January 2003, six of the nine clubs in the Welsh Premiership agreed on a plan that would see four regional franchises, with each club holding 50% of a franchise. Unless otherwise agreed, matches would be equally split between venues of both clubs. The proposed franchises were:

Partner clubs
Swansea RFC (St. Helens)	Llanelli RFC (Stradey Park)
Neath RFC (The Gnoll)	Bridgend RFC (Brewery Field)
Cardiff RFC (Cardiff Arms Park)	Pontypridd RFC (Sardis Road)
Newport RFC (Rodney Parade)	Ebbw Vale RFC (Eugene Cross Park)

Caerphilly RFC did not oppose the plan, despite not having a role to play in a franchise. However Cardiff RFC and Llanelli RFC were opposed to this structure, stating that it "was not in the best interests of Welsh rugby". Despite Llanelli's intention to pursue legal action against the Union if the plans went ahead, an Extraordinary General Meeting of the WRU was scheduled for 23 February.

All 239 member clubs of the Union had a vote of equal weighting, with a simple majority required for the changes to be implemented. In a bid to get some of the non-Premier League clubs to support the changes, the Union announced that the Premier League would be expanded to 16 clubs under the new proposal, which would result in a number of teams being promoted from the division below. The result of the vote was heavily in favour of the changes, with just seven votes against.

On 19 March, Llanelli RFC issued legal proceedings against the WRU, claiming that the Union were acting unlawfully in breaching an agreement between the clubs and the Union that was signed six years previously and were also in breach of European competition law. Three days later, the WRU announced that a consensus had been reached between them and the clubs to implement a five team regional structure. The structure of the teams had been decided with Cardiff and Llanelli each having a region whilst the remaining 6 clubs each held 50% of a region. However further meetings were scheduled to discuss outstanding issues.

=== Agreement ===
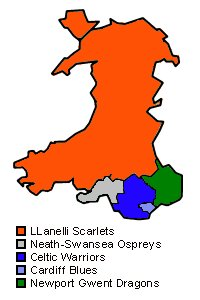
Original regions in 2003

The introduction followed much controversy, as clubs disagreed with the Welsh Rugby Union (WRU), the governing body of the sport in Wales, over many issues, including the forming of partnerships, funding levels, loss of status and both the number and locations of regional teams.

On 1 April 2003, David Moffett announced that the clubs and Union had come to an agreement to implement the five regional teams, which had been approved by the WRU Board of Directors. The details were submitted to the Heineken Cup organisers, ERC, by the 2 April deadline, and the process of setting up companies to own the regions began. The five regions were:

Region name	Owners
Llanelli Scarlets	Llanelli RFC
Neath-Swansea Ospreys	Neath RFC and Swansea RFC
Celtic Warriors	Bridgend RFC and Pontypridd RFC
Cardiff Blues	Cardiff RFC
Gwent Dragons	Ebbw Vale RFC and Newport RFC

=== Further reform ===
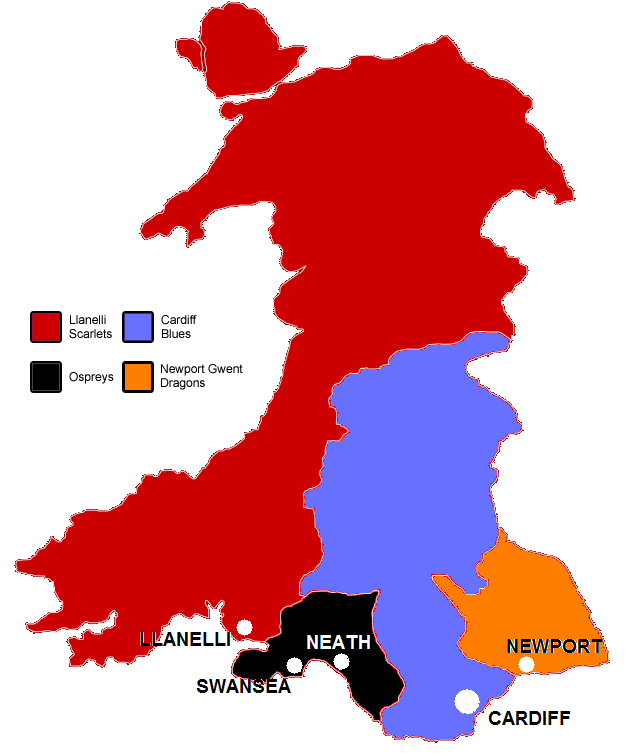
A diagram showing the representation of the regions throughout Wales as they exist today

Celtic Warriors was acquired and liquidated by the WRU at the end of the 2003–04 season, leaving four Welsh regional sides and redrawn catchment areas.

Llanelli Scarlets and Neath-Swansea Ospreys dropped their geographical location in their name to become Scarlets and Ospreys respectively whilst Gwent Dragons added "Newport" to their name as Ebbw Vale RFC dropped out and were replaced by the WRU. More recently, the Newport Gwent Dragons dropped both of their regional identifiers after the 2016–17 season, becoming simply Dragons. This change of identity coincided with the WRU acquiring Newport RFC's 50% stake in the regional side.

Region name	Owners	Feeder area(s)
Scarlets	Llanelli RFC	Clwyd, Dyfed, Gwynedd
Ospreys	Neath RFC and Swansea RFC	West Glamorgan, Ogwr (districts of Mid Glamorgan)
Cardiff Blues	Cardiff RFC	Mid Glamorgan (except Ogwr), Powys, South Glamorgan
Dragons	WRU	Gwent

In 2008, Regional Rugby Wales was established as the association of the four regional teams. It was renamed Pro Rugby Wales in 2014.

=== 2010s ===
Since the regionalisation of professional rugby union in Wales, until the early 2020s, the national team experienced great success, winning the Six Nations Grand Slam in 2005, 2008, 2012, and 2019, as well as winning the championship for a fourth time in 2013 and a fifth time in 2021. Some attributed this success to the regional concept.

In the United Rugby Championship, Welsh teams have won the title six times. The Ospreys are the most successful Welsh team in the history of the league with four titles, a record that was eventually shared and then surpassed by Leinster. The Scarlets have won the league twice, most recently in 2017, and were runners-up the following season, while Cardiff Rugby have been runners-up in consecutive seasons in 2007 and 2008. Despite this, the Welsh sides have made little impact in the European Cup, with no team getting further than the semi-finals. A desire for success in Europe had been one of the principal reasons for setting up the regions in the first place. However, Cardiff Rugby have been successful in the Challenge Cup (the second-tier European competition), winning the tournament twice. They remain the only Welsh region to reach the final of a European competition.

While average attendances at regional matches are generally higher than those at any one club had been before regionalisation, the total numbers attending top-flight rugby in Wales have remained relatively stable, or even declined since 2003 due to the smaller number of teams and matches. While average attendances at all the Welsh regions have steadily grown since 2003 and are generally higher than the Scottish and Italian teams with whom they share the URC, they are far behind those at the Irish teams and are generally lower than in the English Premiership and French Top 14. This may be due to a failure of the regional sides to properly embrace the regional concept, with some being perceived as little more than extensions of former club sides unlikely to gain support among followers of former rivals. Supporters of Pontypridd RFC for example may find it difficult to get behind their regional side Cardiff Rugby, who share colours, name and a stadium with traditional rivals Cardiff RFC. This has led to occasional calls either for the establishment of new regions to better represent those sides who feel unrepresented under the current system, or for the scrapping of the regions and a return to a club-based system.

Financial stability was one of the motivations for the establishment of the regions, yet the regions have remained financially unstable since their establishment as crowds and TV revenue have failed to materialise, with the Celtic Warriors franchise in particular lasting only one year.

Disagreements between the regional teams and the WRU during the 2013–14 season led to questions as to whether the existing regions would continue to play in the Pro12 in 2014–15, with the regions threatening to join the English premiership. The WRU stated it would consider setting up new regional teams to play in the Pro12 and European competitions should this happen. This ultimately didn't happen, following the signing of a new participation agreement.
