= WRU Division Four West =

Welsh rugby union league

- Founded: 1995
- No. of teams: 12
- Country: Wales
- Most recent champion: Tumble RFC (2009–10)
- Level on pyramid: 5
- Promotion to: WRU Division Three West
- Relegation to: WRU Division Five West

The Welsh Rugby Union Division Four West (also called the SWALEC Division Four West for sponsorship reasons) is a rugby union league in Wales first implemented for the 1995/96 season.

== Competition ==
There are 12 clubs in the WRU Division Four West. During the course of a season (which lasts from September to May) each club plays the others twice, once at their home ground and once at the Hpme ground of their opponents for a total of 22 games for each club, with a total of 132 games in each season. Teams receive four points for a win and two point for a draw, an additional bonus point is awarded to either team if they score four tries or more in a single match. No points are awarded for a loss though the losing team can gain a bonus point for finishing the match within seven points of the winning team. Teams are ranked by total points, then the number of tries scored and then points difference. At the end of each season, the club with the most points is crowned as champion. If points are equal the tries scored then points difference determines the winner. The team who is declared champion at the end of the season is eligible for promotion to the WRU Division Three West. The two lowest placed teams are relegated into the WRU Division Five West.

=== Sponsorship ===
In 2008 the Welsh Rugby Union announced a new sponsorship deal for the club rugby leagues with SWALEC valued at £1 million (GBP). The initial three year sponsorship was extended at the end of the 2010/11 season, making SWALEC the league sponsors until 2015. The leagues sponsored are the WRU Divisions one through to seven.

- (2002-2005) Lloyds TSB
- (2005-2008) Asda
- (2008-2015) SWALEC

== 2010/2011 season ==
=== League teams ===
- Aberaeron RFC
- Amman United RFC
- Betws RFC
- Cardigan RFC
- Cefneithin RFC
- Hendy RFC
- Llanybydder RFC
- Milford Haven RFC
- Neyland RFC
- Pembroke Dock Harlequins RFC
- Tenby United RFC
- Trimsaran RFC

== 2009/2010 season ==
=== League teams ===
- Amman United RFC
- Betws RFC
- Burry Port RFC
- Cefneithin RFC
- Hendy RFC
- Milford Haven RFC
- Pembroke RFC
- Pembroke Dock Harlequins RFC
- Pontarddulais RFC
- Tenby United RFC
- Trimsaran RFC
- Tumble RFC

=== 2009/2010 Table ===
2009-2010 WRU Division Four League West Table
| Club | Played | Won | Drawn | Lost | Points for | Points against | Tries for | Tries against | Try bonus | Losing bonus | Points |
| Tumble RFC | 22 | 20 | 0 | 2 | 662 | 291 | 92 | 38 | 12 | 0 | 92 |
| Pontarddulais RFC | 22 | 16 | 0 | 6 | 631 | 375 | 85 | 43 | 12 | 3 | 79 |
| Tenby United RFC | 22 | 16 | 0 | 6 | 584 | 388 | 70 | 47 | 11 | 2 | 77 |
| Cefneithin RFC | 22 | 16 | 0 | 6 | 534 | 386 | 71 | 51 | 9 | 2 | 75 |
| Milford Haven RFC | 22 | 11 | 0 | 11 | 571 | 433 | 82 | 60 | 9 | 6 | 59 |
| Amman United RFC | 22 | 11 | 0 | 11 | 565 | 567 | 77 | 78 | 10 | 3 | 57 |
| Betws RFC | 22 | 11 | 0 | 11 | 415 | 521 | 55 | 67 | 5 | 4 | 53 |
| Hendy RFC | 22 | 7 | 0 | 15 | 398 | 571 | 50 | 81 | 4 | 4 | 36 |
| Trimsaran RFC | 22 | 5 | 1 | 16 | 353 | 493 | 39 | 68 | 3 | 10 | 35 |
| Pembroke Dock Harlequins RFC | 22 | 7 | 0 | 15 | 324 | 578 | 39 | 76 | 2 | 3 | 33 |
| Pembroke RFC | 22 | 6 | 0 | 16 | 335 | 576 | 47 | 73 | 5 | 3 | 32 |
| Burry Port RFC | 22 | 5 | 1 | 16 | 380 | 573 | 47 | 72 | 3 | 6 | 31 |
Correct as of 4 August 2010

== 2008/2009 season ==
=== League teams ===
- Betws RFC
- Brynamman RFC
- Burry Port RFC
- Cwmgors RFC
- Hendy RFC
- Llandeilo RFC
- Pembroke RFC
- Pembroke Dock Harlequins RFC
- Pontarddulais RFC
- Tenby United RFC
- Trimsaran RFC
- Tycroes RFC

=== 2008/2009 Table ===
2008-2009 WRU Division Four League West Table
| Club | Played | Won | Drawn | Lost | Points for | Points against | Tries for | Tries against | Try bonus | Losing bonus | Points |
| Llandeilo RFC | 22 | 21 | 1 | 0 | 917 | 119 | 136 | 14 | 19 | 0 | 105 |
| Brynamman RFC | 22 | 19 | 1 | 2 | 821 | 210 | 116 | 27 | 16 | 2 | 96 |
| Tenby United RFC | 22 | 14 | 0 | 8 | 562 | 461 | 78 | 61 | 10 | 1 | 67 |
| Pembroke Dock Harlequins RFC | 22 | 14 | 0 | 8 | 423 | 351 | 56 | 40 | 7 | 3 | 66 |
| Pontarddulais RFC | 22 | 12 | 1 | 9 | 550 | 503 | 79 | 68 | 11 | 5 | 66 |
| Betws RFC | 22 | 12 | 1 | 9 | 528 | 440 | 72 | 63 | 9 | 0 | 59 |
| Trimsaran RFC | 22 | 10 | 0 | 12 | 471 | 540 | 68 | 77 | 7 | 1 | 48 |
| Pembroke RFC | 22 | 9 | 0 | 13 | 467 | 500 | 69 | 66 | 8 | 4 | 48 |
| Burry Port RFC | 22 | 7 | 1 | 14 | 373 | 688 | 47 | 99 | 3 | 2 | 31 |
| Hendy RFC | 22 | 5 | 0 | 17 | 292 | 707 | 38 | 109 | 1 | 6 | 27 |
| Tycroes RFC | 22 | 4 | 0 | 18 | 267 | 645 | 35 | 89 | 3 | 3 | 18 |
| Cwmgors RFC | 22 | 2 | 1 | 19 | 211 | 718 | 28 | 109 | 2 | 3 | 15 |
Correct as of 2009-06-05

== 2007/2008 season ==
=== League Teams ===
- Birchgrove RFC
- Crymych RFC
- Hendy RFC
- Llandeilo RFC
- Milford Haven RFC
- Morriston RFC
- Neyland RFC
- Pembroke RFC
- Pontarddulais RFC
- Tenby United RFC
- Trimsaran RFC
- Tycroes RFC

=== 2007/2008 Table ===
2007-2008 WRU Division Four League West Table
| Club | Played | Won | Drawn | Lost | Points for | Points against | Tries for | Tries against | Try bonus | Losing bonus | Points |
| Morriston RFC | 22 | 16 | 2 | 4 | 575 | 261 | 82 | 32 | 9 | 2 | 79 |
| Crymych RFC | 22 | 15 | 0 | 7 | 500 | 323 | 64 | 43 | 7 | 3 | 70 |
| Hendy RFC | 22 | 12 | 1 | 9 | 599 | 406 | 83 | 55 | 8 | 3 | 61 |
| Tenby United RFC | 22 | 13 | 2 | 7 | 364 | 267 | 41 | 28 | 2 | 2 | 60 |
| Llandeilo RFC | 22 | 12 | 3 | 7 | 340 | 291 | 37 | 37 | 3 | 3 | 60 |
| Pontarddulais RFC | 22 | 10 | 2 | 10 | 387 | 344 | 58 | 48 | 7 | 5 | 56 |
| Trimsaran RFC | 22 | 10 | 2 | 10 | 319 | 283 | 43 | 29 | 2 | 6 | 52 |
| Birchgrove RFC | 22 | 9 | 2 | 11 | 453 | 475 | 63 | 60 | 7 | 2 | 49 |
| Pembroke RFC | 22 | 7 | 2 | 13 | 286 | 453 | 36 | 61 | 4 | 5 | 41 |
| Tycroes RFC | 22 | 8 | 2 | 12 | 335 | 544 | 40 | 80 | 2 | 1 | 39 |
| Neyland RFC | 22 | 6 | 1 | 15 | 299 | 513 | 40 | 71 | 3 | 2 | 31 |
| Milford Haven RFC | 22 | 4 | 1 | 17 | 300 | 597 | 45 | 88 | 3 | 4 | 25 |
Correct as of 2007-10-15
