= WRU Division Three West A =

Welsh rugby union league

- Sport: Rugby union
- Founded: 2014
- No. of teams: 10
- Country: Wales
- Most recent champion: Pembroke RFC (2017-18)
- Level on pyramid: Level 3
- Promotion to: WRU Division Two West
- Website: WRU National Leagues

The Welsh Rugby Union Division Three West A is a rugby union league in Wales. The founding of the division in 2014 was a result of the decision by the Welsh Rugby Union to localise club rugby, as the players were frustrated with having to travel long distances for matches.

== Competition format ==
=== Competition ===
There are 10 clubs in the WRU Division Three West A. During the course of a season (which lasts from September to May) each club plays every other team twice, once at their home ground and once at that of their opponents for a total of 18 games for each club, with a total of 180 games in each season. Teams receive four points for a win and two points for a draw, an additional bonus point is awarded to either team if they score four tries or more in a single match. No points are awarded for a loss though the losing team can gain a bonus point for finishing the match within seven points of the winning team. Teams are ranked by total points, then the number of tries scored and then points difference. At the end of each season, the club with the most points is crowned as champion. If points are equal the tries scored then points difference determines the winner. The team who is declared champion at the end of the season is eligible for promotion to the WRU Division Two West. There is no relegation from this division.

== 2014–15 season ==
=== League teams ===
- Pontyberem RFC
- Lampeter Town RFC
- Penybanc RFC
- Tumble RFC
- Burry Port RFC
- Trimsaran RFC
- Nantgaredig RFC
- Bynea RFC
- New Dock Stars RFC
- Cefneithin RFC
- Llandybie RFC

=== 2014–15 table ===
2014-15 WRU Division Three West A Table
	Club	Played	Won	Drawn	Lost	Points for	Points against	Tries for	Tries against	Try bonus	Losing bonus	Points
1	Pontyberem RFC	20	19	0	1	783	318	102	43	14	1	91
2	Lampeter Town RFC	20	15	1	4	605	284	82	30	12	4	78
3	Penybanc RFC	20	14	0	6	502	449	76	56	10	0	66
4	Tumble RFC	20	12	0	8	441	421	54	55	7	3	58
5	Burry Port RFC	20	11	0	9	541	447	78	59	9	3	56
6	Trimsaran RFC	20	10	0	10	516	519	76	70	10	4	54
7	Nantgaredig RFC	20	10	0	10	471	475	58	65	5	5	50
8	Bynea RFC	20	9	0	11	464	414	61	51	7	4	47
9	New Dock Stars RFC	20	6	0	14	397	527	48	73	5	5	34
10	Cefneithin RFC	20	2	0	18	271	669	33	97	2	3	13
11	Llandybie RFC	20	1	1	18	207	675	44	60	1	2	9
Correct as of 26 May 2015

== 2015–16 season ==
=== League teams ===
- Haverfordwest RFC
- Cardigan RFC
- Milford Haven RFC
- Pembroke RFC
- Laugharne Town RFC
- Pembroke Dock Harlequins RFC
- Neyland RFC
- St Clears RFC
- St Davids RFC
- Llangwm RFC

=== 2015–16 table ===
2015-16 WRU Division Three West A Table
	Club	Played	Won	Drawn	Lost	Points for	Points against	Tries for	Tries against	Try bonus	Losing bonus	Points
1	Haverfordwest RFC	18	17	0	1	563	148	85	19	10	1	79
2	Cardigan RFC	18	14	0	4	590	297	84	44	9	6	71
3	Milford Haven RFC	18	14	0	4	631	276	101	42	12	1	69
4	Pembroke RFC	18	12	0	6	763	301	126	45	13	2	59
5	Laugharne RFC	18	9	0	9	543	392	87	65	11	2	49
6	Pembroke Dock Harlequins RFC	18	9	0	9	457	304	72	45	9	3	48
7	Neyland RFC	18	6	0	12	340	442	50	66	6	2	32
8	St Clears RFC	18	6	0	12	333	581	50	91	5	1	30
9	St Davids RFC	18	3	0	15	185	833	32	136	2	0	14
10	Llangwm RFC	18	0	0	18	86	917	12	146	0	2	2
Correct as of 26 May 2016
