= Carwyn James =

Welsh rugby union player and coach (1929–1983)

- Born: Carwyn Rees James; 2 November 1929 Cefneithin, Wales
- Died: 10 January 1983 (aged 53) Amsterdam, Netherlands
- Height: 173 cm (5 ft 8 in)
- Weight: 73 kg (161 lb)
- School: Gwendraeth Grammar School
- University: Aberystwyth University
- Occupation: Teacher

Rugby union career
- Position: Fly-half
Amateur team(s)
Years	Team	Apps	(Points)
–	Cefneithin		
1947–1950	Llanelli		
- Devonport Services
- London Welsh
- Royal Navy
1954	Swansea		
1954–1966	Llanelli		
1957	Barbarians		
International career
Years	Team	Apps	(Points)
1958	Wales	2	(3)
Coaching career
- Years: Team
- 1969–1977: Llanelli
- 1971: British Lions
- 1977: Rugby Rovigo

Carwyn Rees James (2 November 1929 – 10 January 1983) was a Welsh rugby union player and coach, literary scholar, broadcaster, political activist, Welsh nationalist and spy.

James won two international caps for Wales but is most famous for his coaching achievements, being the only man to coach a British Lions team to win a series in New Zealand, as well as leading both the Barbarians to their first victory over the All Blacks and Llanelli RFC to their famous 9–3 victory over the All Blacks during the same tour. As coach of Llanelli, James also won the Welsh Cup four consecutive times from 1973 to 1976.

== Early life and education ==
James was born in Cefneithin in 1929, to coalminer David Michael James and his wife Annie (née Davies). His father was a farmhand who moved from poverty in rural Cardiganshire (where the young Carwyn spent every summer) to the Gwendraeth Valley at the beginning of the 1920s and the promise of work in the Carmarthenshire coalfield.

James' early years were dominated by rugby and a traditional chapel upbringing. His primary school headmaster was former Welsh international player, W. J. Jones and James was regularly taken to support Cefneithin RFC, where he carried the boots of the club's fly-half, Haydn Jones. His love of rugby continued at Ysgol y Gwendraeth where he played at fly-half, but the school also instilled in him a love of the Welsh language and culture through the efforts of his teacher, Dora Williams. He captained Wales Secondary Schools in his final year at Gwendraeth by which time he had already made his senior debut as a 17-year-old for Llanelli RFC.

In 1948, James went to Aberystwyth University to study Geography, Philosophy, Welsh History and Welsh. At Aberystwyth, James was greatly influenced by the famous literary figures of T. H. Parry-Williams and Gwenallt, who remained a profound influence on James' literary and academic work throughout his life. While James was an able and conscientious student, he was also a prolific sportsman, captaining both the college rugby and cricket teams, as well as playing for the Aberystwyth RFC first XV.

== Espionage ==
Despite his nationalist politics and a history of protesting against the Ministry of Defence, James fulfilled his National Service commitment and joined the Navy, during which time he played for Devonport Services R.F.C., the Royal Navy and London Welsh RFC. Little was known about the nature of his two years of service until 2016, when research revealed that the multilingual James was trained in Russian through the GCHQ, before becoming a member of the elite Joint Services School for Linguists. It is known that James spent four months at RAF Wythall, before moving to Cuxhaven, Germany, in 1954. James' role in Germany seems to have been the interception of messages transmitted from the Soviets to East Berlin and to listen in on Soviet military radio. Later in life, James became a committed pacifist, stating that his "immaturity" had brought him to serve in the Navy. However, while James added that he had no doubt in his pacifism, he was at least glad to have learned another language.

Shortly after his national service was complete, James was asked to represent Swansea RFC on their 1954 tour of Romania. James had to seek special clearance to travel behind the Iron Curtain, as he was still bound by the Official Secrets Act and it has been speculated that espionage may have been the true reason why a Llanelli man such as James was selected by Swansea. The tourists were invited to attend a military air show in Romania, and it has been claimed that James conspired with the British Embassy to conceal a diminutive member of their staff to covertly photographed the aircraft for British intelligence.

After completing a teacher training course and National Service, James took up his first teaching post at Queen Elizabeth Grammar School in Carmarthen. He was then invited by Llandovery College to establish a new department of Welsh. At Llandovery, James was able to combine his teaching and cultural aspirations with rugby, as the college had a very strong tradition in the sport as well as modern training facilities which could match James' ambitions.

== Rugby career ==
=== As a player ===
James played fly-half for Llanelli RFC, playing his first game at just 17 while still a student at Ysgol y Gwendraeth. Over seven seasons and more than 150 matches. He also captained London Welsh RFC to victory at the 1956 Middlesex Sevens.

Despite James being known as a talented outside half, he missed out on both Wales selection and the 1955 British Lions tour to South Africa, with one of Wales's best-ever fly-halves, Cliff Morgan being preferred by both teams. Indeed, James travelled with the Welsh team as a reserve on more than twenty occasions until the 4 January 1958, when an injury to Morgan allowed James to finally make his international debut at the age of 28 against the touring Australians at Cardiff Arms Park. James scored a drop goal in a 9–3 victory, and was selected for his second cap two months later, this time to play alongside Morgan in what would be both player's final test appearance in the last match of the 1958 Five Nations Championship against France.

=== As a coach ===
In 1969 James became both a lecturer at Trinity College, Carmarthen and coach at Stradey Park. James brought the same philosophy from his teaching to his coaching work, simplifying the gameplan and encouraging his players to think for themselves. James wanted his teams to move the ball swiftly from one touchline to the other, creating space for the wingers. To achieve this James recruited the English Modern pentathlete, Tom Hudson to work on his players fitness levels, while he repeatedly trained them in basic skills and passing drills executed at full speed. In his first year as coach, James' anti-apartheid convictions were tested when Llanelli hosted South Africa on their tour of Britain and Ireland. James prepared the team as normal, but remained in the changing rooms throughout the game as a personal protest.

In 1970, shortly before standing as the Plaid Cymru candidate for Llanelli in the 1970 general election, James was interviewed in London for the position of head coach of the British Lions on their 1971 tour to New Zealand. James' nationalist politics were a subject of concern for the selection committee, who questioned James on his political ambitions and whether his campaign in Llanelli would conflict with the tour. James famously replied by quoting the betting odds (which had him as a rank outsider in such a safe Labour seat) and offered to take the committee's money if they wanted to bet against him.

Despite the questions, James was chosen as coach of the British Lions on their 1971 tour to New Zealand. Together with the tour manager Doug Smith and captain John Dawes, James again managed to bring his philosophy of open rugby and his psychology of instilling self-belief into the talented squad of players. James also persuaded a reluctant Barry John to tour as his first choice fly-half. John had admired James as a child growing up in Cefneithin and the relationship that they developed was fundamental to the success of the tour. The Lions won 23 of their 26 matches in New Zealand, and became the first and only Lions team to win a test series there. James was offered an OBE for his services but refused as both a Welsh nationalist and Welsh republican. However he did accept an invitation to join the Gorsedd y Beirdd at the National Eisteddfod of Wales.

After losing the test series, the All Blacks would remain unbeaten until they faced another Carwyn James side, Llanelli RFC in the fourth match of their 1972–73 tour. James gave a notable speech before the game, which moved players such as Phil Bennett, Ray Gravell and Delme Thomas to tears. After a brutal and bruising match described by the Llanelli flanker Gareth Jenkins as "the most physical game I've ever played in", Llanelli won their most famous victory in front of 20,000 spectators at Stradey Park. The game is remembered as the "day the pubs ran dry" and has become part of Welsh rugby folklore, immortalised in works such as the song 9–3 by Max Boyce.

Later in the tour, New Zealand would face a Carwyn James side for the third and final time as James coached the invitational team, Barbarians F.C. to their first ever victory over the All Blacks in 1973. Again James pre-match words had a direct impact on the players, this time subtly hinting to the fly-half Phil Bennett to rely on his attacking abilities:

"Phil you have a great sidestep, but I don't suppose you will use it. Yet these All Blacks are made to be sidestepped, you could sidestep them off the park."

Bennett would later state that James' words influenced his thinking when he caught a kick from the New Zealand winger Bryan Williams near his own goal line. Instead of returning the kick Bennett sidestepped three times, evading three tackles and initiating a move which ended in Gareth Edwards scoring what has become known as "that try" a score often considered to be the best in the history of the sport. The match itself is also considered to be one of the best ever played in rugby union, with James's side eventually claiming a 23-11 victory at Cardiff Arms Park.

Following his success with the Barbarians James again returned to Llanelli, where he would win the next four Challenge Cups consecutive between 1973 and 1976. Many felt that his success with Llanelli, the Lions and the Barbarians would see James become Wales coach, and James applied for the role in 1974. However, James insisted on having the final say on selection at a time when the national team was chosen by a committee of selectors. The WRU insisted that the selectors would have their say on the team and James withdrew his application.

Depressed and disillusioned, in 1977 James accepted an invitation to coach Rovigo in Italy. James time in Italy was marked not only by winning the Italian championship in his second season, but also a new environment, an opportunity to learn another language, write a weekly column and continue his teaching career at a local school. James returned to Wales in 1979, where he co-authored a book on the 1980 British Lions tour to South Africa and his own book "Focus on Rugby", which was published posthumously.

=== Coaching style ===
James' coaching style was said to involve quiet words with players and half-suggestions rather than orders.

Mervyn Davies said, "He invited us to take personal responsibility for our role but without ever telling us what to do." Mike Gibson said, "We were free to express our ability, free to attack from any situation." He said in some training sessions James would run behind the backs, shouting 'Think! Think! Think!'

James was a strong believer in attacking rugby, with the attitude that if a team had possession of the ball it should be able to attack, regardless of the position on the field.

== Literary and media work ==
James maintained a life long interest in literature, with the Llanelli victory over the All Blacks being described as "as much a part of Welsh folklore as the Mabinogion that captured Carwyn's imagination as a young man". As a literary scholar, he covered works in Welsh, English, Russian and Italian.

From 1974 onwards James devoted himself full time to his writing and broadcasting work. He was BBC Wales's first rugby analyst and first rugby columnist for The Guardian newspaper. He also helped to create a standardised glossary of rugby terminology in the Welsh language.

== Personal life and political views ==
James lived much of his life in Cefneithin with his sister Gwen (a psychiatric nurse) in the bungalow which they had built for their parents. James never married with much speculation that he was homosexual.

James was a committed Welsh nationalist and Welsh republican, refusing an OBE due to his convictions. James was also an ardent opponent of apartheid, during the controversial 1969–70 Springbok tour, he prepared the Llanelli team as usual, but remained in the dressing room throughout the match as a protest. James stood as the Plaid Cymru candidate for Llanelli in the 1970 general election. James' received 8,000 votes, which was considered a major achievement for the party at that time, though he still fell well short of the Labour candidate, Denzil Davies. In his later years James was also a pacifist.

James suffered great pain from a serious case eczema and was a life long smoker. In the years before his death, James gained weight and would consume significant amounts of alcohol.

== Death and legacy ==
In January 1983, 53-year-old James took a break after making a television series, James had stayed with Cliff Morgan before making a visit to the Netherlands, where he stayed alone at the Hotel Krasnapolsky in Dam Square, Amsterdam. The Western Mail reported that his body was discovered in the bath of his hotel suite, having lain there for some days. Police said he had died of a heart attack and there were no suspicious circumstances.

The Carwyn James Pub in Llanelli, with information boards displaying the date and score of the famous victory over the All Blacks as well as the quotes "the day the pubs ran dry" and "the day the Gods smiled on the Scarlets" and The Carwyn James Building at Aberystwyth University.

James was cremated in a private ceremony at Morriston, Swansea two additional memorial services were held at Tabernacle Chapel in Cefneithin and another in Cardiff. Three years after his death, a bronze bust of James was unveiled in the foyer of Broadcasting House, Cardiff. He was inducted into the Welsh Sports Hall of Fame in 1999 and into the World Rugby Hall of Fame in 2015. The sports building of Aberystwyth University is named after him, as is the playing field at Cefneithin RFC. In Italy, an international tournament, called "Carwyn James Easter Trophy", is held in Pieve di Cento, Bologna. The 12th edition was in 2016. The trophy is for Under 15s sides and has been arranged with the help of Carwyn's nephew, Llyr James.

After the 2024 Six Nations Championship, WRU chief executive Abi Tierney suggested that a new cup should be awarded to the winner of the annual game between Wales and Italy named for Carwyn James and Roy Bish. In November that year, celebrations for what would have been James' 95th birthday took place in Cefneithin. Events included the Mynydd Mawr male voice choir performing at at Cefneithin Primary School, with children reciting some of James' own writing on his childhood in the village. A blue plaque was revealed at his former home at 2 Heol Yr Ysgol by the former Llanelli captain Delme Thomas. following another moment of remembrance at Cefneithin RFCs match against Amman United RFC, the day concluded at Y Neuadd (the village hall), with the performance of a play dramatising James' life.

== Bibliography ==
- Hughes, Gareth (1983). One hundred years of Scarlet. Llanelli Rugby Football Club. ISBN 0-9509159-0-4.
- Gibbard, Alun (2017). Into the Wind: The life of Carwyn James. Y Lolfa. ISBN 978-1-78461-404-1.
