= William Jones (rugby union) =

- Full name: William John Jones
- Born: 4 February 1894 Cefneithin, Wales
- Died: 15 July 1978 (aged 84) Nantgaredig, Wales

Rugby union career
- Position: Forward
International career
Years	Team	Apps	(Points)
1924	Wales	1	(0)

William John Jones (4 February 1894 – 15 July 1978) was a Welsh international rugby union player.

Jones was born in Cefneithin and attended Carmarthen Grammar School.

A forward, Jones played for Llanelly and was capped for Wales against Ireland at Cardiff in the 1924 Five Nations. He was invited to be a reserve for their next fixture in Paris, but had to make himself unavailable owing to the illness of his wife.

Jones was working as a school teacher in the village of Cross Hands at the time of his Wales cap. He was later the primary school headmaster of future Wales cap Carwyn James.

== See also ==
- List of Wales national rugby union players
