= Handel Greville =

Wales international rugby union player (1921–2014)

- Born: Handel Greville; 13 September 1921 Drefach, Carmarthenshire, Wales
- Died: 20 June 2014 (aged 92) Llanelli, Wales
- School: Gwendraeth Grammar School

Rugby union career
- Position: Scrum-half
Amateur team(s)
Years	Team	Apps	(Points)
- Carmarthen Athletic RFC
–	Cefneithin RFC		
–	Llandybie RFC		
–	Llanelli RFC		
–	Swansea RFC		
–	Llanelli Wanderers RFC		
–	Pontyberem RFC		
–	Tumble RFC		
International career
Years	Team	Apps	(Points)
1947	Wales	1	(0)

Handel Greville (13 September 1921 – 20 June 2014) was a Welsh international rugby union fly-half who played club rugby for a large selection of clubs but most notably for Llanelli. He won just a single international cap for Wales against the touring Australia.

== Rugby career ==
Greville was born in Drefach, Wales and turned out for several rugby clubs before joining first class team Llanelli. Greville captained Llanelli during the 1948/49 season. He was selected for his only international cap for Wales when the normally reliable Haydn Tanner was unavailable through injury. The game was against the touring Australians which Wales won 6–0 in a match dominated by forward play. Greville gave an international-class performance but lost his place when Tanner was deemed fit for the next game.

After finishing his playing career, Greville became Chairman and the President of Llanelli Rugby Club, and in 2008 was the oldest living captain to attend the final game parade at Stradey Park. He suffered ill-health in his later life, and died in June 2014 at Prince Philip Hospital in Llanelli at the age of 92.

=== International matches played ===
Wales

- Australia 1947

== Bibliography ==
- Smith, David; Williams, Gareth (1980). Fields of Praise: The Official History of The Welsh Rugby Union. Cardiff: University of Wales Press. ISBN 0-7083-0766-3.
