= Neyland RFC =

Welsh rugby union club, based in Neyland

(Wales) Neyland RFC
- Full name: Neyland Rugby Football Club
- Union: Welsh Rugby Union
- Nickname: All Blacks
- Founded: 1885; 141 years ago
- Location: Neyland, Wales
- Ground: The Athletic Ground
- Chairman: John Laugharne
- President: Rodney Chamberlain
- Coach(es): Graham Richards and Steven Evans
- Captain: (Wales) Mark James
- League: WRU Division Three West A
- 2018/19: 6th
1st kit	2nd kit

Official website
- www.neylandrfc.co.uk

Neyland Rugby Football Club is a rugby union team from the town of Neyland in West Wales. The club is a member of the Welsh Rugby Union and is a feeder club for the Scarlets.

Neyland Rugby Football Club claim to have been founded in 1885 and celebrated their 125th anniversary during the 2011–12 season. In 1946, just after the reformation of competitive rugby in Wales after the events of the Second World War, the club formed a joint committee with the local cricket club to purchase a playing field. The playing fields would, in 1963, become part of the local Athletics Club. In 2015, Neyland Rugby Football Club turned 130 years old. Five years later, in 2020, the club celebrated its 135th anniversary year.

== Club honours ==
In the 2009/10 season, after several years in WRU Division Five West, Neyland were promoted to WRU Division Four West after winning the league. It was an impressive season with the senior team losing only one of the 22 games of the tournament, and scoring more tries than any team across all regions and divisions; a total of 150.

== Kit ==
Neyland traditionally play in black shirts, with black shorts and black socks. They occasionally wear an alternative kit: a white shirt with black hoops and red sleeves, with black shorts and socks.

== Rivalries ==
Neyland's main rivals include Milford Haven RFC, Pembroke Dock Harlequins RFC and Llangwm RFC. However, with the Division now much more localised, almost every game is a local derby.

== Notable former players ==
Although no players have been directly capped for an international team from Neyland, Tommy Evans began his career for the club before switching to first-class clubs Llanelli and then Swansea, gaining his cap for the later in 1925. It was with Swansea that Evans also faced the 'Invincible' 1924 touring New Zealand team.
