= Eifion Evans (church historian) =

Welsh pastor (1931–2017)

Eifion Evans (7 April 1931 – 1 November 2017) was a Welsh pastor and church historian.

Born in Cross Hands, Evans trained as a pharmacist before entering theological training for the Presbyterian Church ministry. He ministered in Cardiff, Aberystwyth, Belfast, and Abergavenny, before returning to pharmacy in West Wales while continuing his preaching ministry and the encouraging of smaller fellowships. He eventually settled in the Llanelli area with his wife Meira.

== Career ==
Evans wrote several books about Christianity in Wales, including accounts of the revivals of 1859 and 1904–05, as well as biographies of Daniel Rowland, Howell Harris, and William Williams Pantycelyn.

== Death ==
Evans died on 1 November 2017, aged 86, at his home in Gorslas, Carmarthenshire, survived by his wife, his children Meirion, Rhiannon and Jonathan, his son-in-law Tom and daughters-in-law Sharon and Sarah, and his grandchildren Tomos, Nia, Hannah and Rhys.

== Links ==
- Bibliography, amazon.com; accessed 6 February 2018.
- Profile, emw.org.uk, August 1983.
