= Griff Bevan =

Wales international rugby union player

- Full name: Griffith Wilfred Bevan
- Born: 15 August 1914 Burry Port, Wales
- Died: 25 October 2004 (aged 90) Carmarthen, Wales

Rugby union career
- Position: Prop
International career
Years	Team	Apps	(Points)
1947	Wales	1	(0)

Griffith Wilfred Bevan (15 August 1914 — 25 October 2004) was a Welsh international rugby union player.

Born in Burry Port, Bevan was a steel worker and made his solitary Wales appearance in the country's first post-war international, a 1947 Five Nations match against England in Cardiff.

Bevan captained the Llanelly side to their famous over the touring 1947–48 Wallabies at Stradley Park.

After achieving his Wales cap, Bevan left Llanelly for hometown club Burry Port in 1948.

== See also ==
- List of Wales national rugby union players
