= WRU Division Five West =

Rugby union league in Wales

- Founded: 1995
- No. of teams: 11
- Country: Wales
- Most recent champion: Neyland RFC (2009–10)
- Level on pyramid: 6
- Promotion to: WRU Division Four West, WRU Division Four South West
- Relegation to: WRU Division Six Central
- Website: www.wru.co.uk/1161_2100.php

The Welsh Rugby Union Division Five West (also called the SWALEC Division Five West for sponsorship reasons) is a rugby union league in Wales first implemented for the 1995/96 season.

== Competition format and sponsorship ==
=== Competition ===
There are 11 clubs in the WRU Division Five West. During the course of a season (which lasts from September to May) each club plays the others twice, once at their home ground and once at that of their opponents for a total of 20 games for each club, with a total of 110 games in each season. Teams receive four points for a win and two point for a draw, an additional bonus point is awarded to either team if they score four tries or more in a single match. No points are awarded for a loss though the losing team can gain a bonus point for finishing the match within seven points of the winning team. Teams are ranked by total points, then the number of tries scored and then points difference. At the end of each season, the club with the most points is crowned as champion. If points are equal the tries scored then points difference determines the winner. The team who is declared champion at the end of the season is eligible for promotion to the WRU Division Four South West.

=== Sponsorship ===
In 2008 the Welsh Rugby Union announced a new sponsorship deal for the club rugby leagues with SWALEC valued at £1 million (GBP). The initial three year sponsorship was extended at the end of the 2010/11 season, making SWALEC the league sponsors until 2015. The leagues sponsored are the WRU Divisions one through to seven.

- (2002-2005) Lloyds TSB
- (2005-2008) Asda
- (2008-2015) SWALEC

== 2010/2011 season ==
=== League teams ===
- Burry Port RFC
- Bynea RFC
- Fishguard and Goodwick RFC
- Furance United RFC
- Llandybie RFC
- Llangwm RFC
- Pembroke RFC
- Penygroes RFC
- Pontyates RFC
- St. Clears RFC
- St. Davids RFC
- Swansea Uplands RFC

== 2009/2010 season ==
=== League teams ===
- Aberaeron RFC
- Bynea RFC
- Fishguard and Goodwick RFC
- Furance United RFC
- Llangwm RFC
- New Dock Stars RFC
- Neyland RFC
- Penygroes RFC
- Pontyates RFC
- St. Clears RFC
- St. Davids RFC
- Swansea Uplands RFC

=== League table ===
2009-2010 WRU Division Five West League Table
Club	Played	Won	Drawn	Lost	Points for	Points against	Tries for	Tries against	Try bonus	Losing bonus	Points
Neyland RFC	22	20	1	1	980	174	148	19	16	0	98
Aberaeron RFC	22	19	1	2	889	152	136	19	14	0	92
Fishguard and Goodwick RFC	22	17	1	4	618	198	80	20	8	3	81
Furnace United RFC	22	14	0	8	655	243	105	27	11	6	73
Penygroes RFC	22	11	0	11	460	391	61	54	7	6	57
New Dock Stars RFC	22	11	0	11	592	634	90	92	9	2	55
St. Clears RFC	22	10	1	11	408	398	55	49	6	3	51
St. Davids RFC	22	11	0	11	351	546	50	80	5	1	50
Bynea RFC	22	10	0	12	261	452	28	60	1	0	41
Llangwm RFC	22	3	0	19	273	784	31	119	2	7	21
Swansea Uplands RFC	22	2	0	20	148	916	22	140	2	1	11
Pontyates RFC	22	2	0	20	190	937	17	144	1	1	10
Correct as of 4 August 2010

== 2008/2009 season ==
=== League teams ===
- Aberaeron RFC
- Swansea Uplands RFC
- Cefneithin RFC
- Fishguard and Goodwick RFC
- Furnace United RFC
- Llangwm RFC
- Milford RFC
- Neyland RFC
- Pontyates RFC
- St. Clears RFC
- St. Davids RFC

=== League table ===
2008-2009 WRU Division Five West League Table
Club	Played	Won	Drawn	Lost	Points for	Points against	Tries for	Tries against	Try bonus	Losing bonus	Points
Cefneithin RFC	20	17	1	2	626	179	88	18	10	2	82
Milford Haven RFC	20	16	1	3	566	193	85	21	9	2	77
Furnace United RFC	20	15	0	5	608	234	94	32	13	3	76
Aberaeron RFC	20	12	1	7	396	208	59	25	8	4	62
St. Clears RFC	20	11	1	8	448	264	56	38	6	4	56
Neyland RFC	20	11	0	9	450	248	67	28	6	3	53
Fishguard and Goodwick RFC	20	11	0	9	368	315	48	41	4	3	51
Pontyates RFC	19	6	0	13	219	435	26	63	3	1	28
Llangwm RFC	20	3	1	16	150	598	14	91	0	3	17
St. Davids RFC	19	2	1	16	176	510	23	74	1	3	14
Swansea Uplands RFC	20	2	0	18	97	920	12	141	0	0	8
Correct as of 12 August 2009

== 2007/2008 season ==
=== League teams ===
- Aberaeron RFC
- Burry Port RFC
- Cefneithin RFC
- Fishguard and Goodwick RFC
- Furnace United RFC
- Llandybie RFC
- Llangwm RFC
- Penygroes RFC
- Pontyates RFC
- St. Clears RFC
- St. Davids RFC

=== League table ===
2007-2008 WRU Division Five West League Table
Club	Played	Won	Drawn	Lost	Points for	Points against	Tries for	Tries against	Try bonus	Losing bonus	Points
Burry Port RFC	20	18	0	2	438	180	64	23	8	0	80
Cefneithin RFC	20	15	0	5	379	206	55	25	6	3	69
Aberaeron RFC	20	13	0	7	369	232	49	28	6	5	63
Penygroes RFC	20	10	0	10	355	307	46	42	4	5	49
Llandybie RFC	20	9	0	11	377	376	48	52	5	6	47
Furnace United RFC	20	9	0	11	312	295	46	36	4	7	47
Fishguard and Goodwick RFC	20	9	0	11	261	321	31	41	2	5	43
Llangwm RFC	20	7	1	12	325	357	45	49	4	9	43
St. Davids RFC	20	9	0	11	256	494	32	69	1	2	39
St. Clears RFC	20	7	1	12	235	316	30	48	3	4	37
Pontyates RFC	20	3	0	17	230	453	29	62	2	6	20
Correct as of 18:13 14 June 2008
