= Niamh Terry =

Wales international rugby union footballer

- Born: 30 April 2000 (age 26) Swansea, South Wales
- Height: 1.65 m (5 ft 5 in)
- Weight: 64.09 kg (10 st 1.3 lb)

Rugby union career
- Position: Fly half
- Current team: Exeter Chiefs
Senior career
Years	Team	Apps	(Points)
2020-present	Exeter Chiefs		
2018-2019	Ospreys		
2016-2018	Hendy RFC		
International career
Years	Team	Apps	(Points)
2019-present	Wales	4	
- Correct as of 3 June 2021

Niamh Terry (born 30 April 2000) is a Welsh Rugby Union player who plays fly half for the Wales women's national rugby union team and Exeter Chiefs. She made her debut for the Wales national squad in 2019 and was part of the team at the 2021 Women's Six Nations Championship.

== Club career ==
Terry has been playing rugby since the age of eight, initially with the Morriston RFC boys' side, and then with Hendy RFC girls under-18s. She has played for both Ospreys youth and senior teams, and has captained the Wales under-18 sevens side, as well as the Welsh touch rugby team.

She signed with her current club, the Exeter Chiefs, in 2020. Her first start for the club saw her contribute a try to a 17-10 victory against Worcester Warriors.

== International career ==
Terry made her debut for Wales in the 2019 Autumn Internationals in a match against Spain. She made her first start for the team in 2019, against Scotland.

Terry has won four caps in her rugby career to date. She was selected in Wales squad for the 2021 Rugby World Cup in New Zealand.

== Personal life ==
Terry attended Morriston Comprehensive School before moving to Gower College, where she was named both Ladies Academy Player of the Year and Sportswoman of the Year.
