= Fishguard and Goodwick RFC =

- Full name: Fishguard and Goodwick Rugby Football Club
- Nickname(s): The Seagulls
- Founded: 1887
- Location: Fishguard, Wales
- Ground(s): The Moor, Goodwick (Capacity: Unlimited)
- Chairman: Jonathan Jones
- Coach(es): Nathan Jenkins and Steve Jenkins
- League(s): WRU SWALEC Division 2 West
- 2019-20: 6th
Team kit

Official website
- www.fishguard-goodwickrfc.co.uk

Fishguard and Goodwick Rugby Football Club (Welsh: Clwb Abergwaun ac Wdig) is a Welsh rugby union team from Fishguard which also represents the town of Goodwick in South-west Wales. Fishguard and Goodwick RFC is a member of the Welsh Rugby Union and is a feeder club for the Scarlets. The club fields a First XV, youth team and junior sides.

== Club history ==
A rugby union team has played in the Fishguard and Goodwick area since the first decade of the twentieth century, with the earliest photo showing a Goodwick Rugby Football team from the 1907/08 season. However, the first Fishguard team was formed sometime in 1887 during the 1887/1888 season. Rugby football was suspended during both World Wars, but by the 1950s a joint Fishguard and Goodwick team was reformed and playing in minor leagues against local opposition, with their traditional rivals being St. Davids RFC. By the 1990s the club was a member of the Welsh Rugby Union and was playing in the Pembrokeshire League (Jewson League).

With the introduction of the professional era, Fishguard and Goodwick found themselves in the West region of the WRU leagues, becoming a feeder club for the Scarlets. The last three years have seen the club finish in the mid to top regions of WRU Division Five West finishing third in the 2009/10 season. In 2011 the club benefited from a £1.3 million grant to build a new sports facility for the area. Fishguard and Goodwick RFC contributed £50,000 to the build, which included £20,000 from the Millennium Stadium Charitable Trust, a grassroots improvement scheme which is funded through all ticket sales from the National Stadium. The new centre included new team changing rooms and a referee changing room for use by the club.

During the 2012-2013 season, Fishguard and Goodwick RFC reached the final of the SWALEC Bowl competition, with the final being held at the Millennium Stadium. They lost 27-17 to Wattstown RFC, however it is the highest achievement the club has to date, with no other Pembrokeshire club having reached any national final. The club received the freedom of the twin towns for their achievement in reaching the final. It is a little known fact that the first fridge freezer sold in Wales was to Fishguard and Goodwick RFC in 1958.
