= Ysgol y Gwendraeth =

Former school in Carmarthenshire, Wales

Coordinates: 51.7965°N 4.1331°W

Ysgol y Gwendraeth was a secondary comprehensive school for pupils aged 11 to 18 in the Gwendraeth Valley, Carmarthenshire, Wales. Situated in the village of Drefach, it had 312 pupils in 2012. The School was effectively closed in 2013 when it was merged with Ysgol Maes Yr Yrfa and teaching at the Ysgol y Gwendraeth site in Drefach ceased. This merger eventually led to Ysgol Maes Y Gwendraeth.

The school was originally a Grammar School known as Gwendraeth Grammar School, or Gwendraeth Valley Grammar School. The original school building was built in 1927.

The school promoted the Welsh language, Welsh history, and Welsh culture. Some subjects were available to be taught in the Welsh language if requested; otherwise the lessons were taught in the English language only.

There was also a Sixth Form College and the school additionally housed the Garreglwyd Autistic Unit and Annex.

The majority of the pupils and staff could speak Welsh. Many staff members lived in or near the valley and were thus naturally immersed in all aspects of the life of the community.

Ysgol Y Gwendraeth earned the 2001–2002 Schools Curriculum Award.

The feeder primary schools were Category A schools, where Welsh is the language spoken and taught up to the age of seven and where Welsh culture is actively promoted with the assistance of Menter Cwm Gwendraeth, which promotes Welsh and Welsh culture and history.

== Notable former pupils ==
- Darren Allinson, rugby union player
- Nic Cudd, rugby union player
- Jonathan Davies, rugby player and television commentator
- Hugh Gustafson, rugby union player
- Carwyn James, rugby union player and coach
- Lisa Lazarus, actress, model and beauty pageant titleholder
- John Meurig Thomas, scientist and educator
