= Cefneithin =

Village and community in Carmarthenshire, Wales

Coordinates: 51.805169°N 4.103653°W

- Location within Carmarthenshire
- OS grid reference: SN550139
- Community: Gorslas
- Principal area: Carmarthenshire
- Preserved county: Dyfed
- Country: Wales
- Sovereign state: United Kingdom
- Post town: LLANELLI
- Postcode district: SA14
- Dialling code: 01269
- Police: Dyfed-Powys
- Fire: Mid and West Wales
- Ambulance: Welsh
- UK Parliament: Llanelli
- Senedd Cymru – Welsh Parliament: Carmarthen East and Dinefwr

Cefneithin (Welsh pronunciation) is a village and community in Carmarthenshire, Wales, in the Carmarthenshire coalfield area. It lies just off the A48 road, 7 miles (11 km) north west of Ammanford and 9 miles (14 km) north of Llanelli. Its nearby community villages include Cross Hands, Drefach, Cwmmawr, Foelgastell and Gorslas. The Gwendraeth Fawr river flows nearby and its source is at Llyn Llech Owain, just north of the village. Cefneithin has a chapel (Tabernacl) and a village hall (Y Neuadd)

The local rugby club, Cefneithin RFC, was founded in 1922.

Cefneithin has a primary school and a secondary school. The latter, Ysgol Maes Y Gwendraeth, was re-opened in 2016 after an extensive renovation and an £18.4 million investment; it has 1,000 pupils, including a sixth form of approximately 150, and resources for children with additional learning needs. Prior to 2016 when the school was called Ysgol Gyfun Maes Yr Yrfa, some of its famous pupils include Nigel Owens (international rugby referee), Jonathan Edwards (MP for Carmarthen East and Dinefwr), TV presenter Alex Jones and British & Irish Lions rugby player Dwayne Peel.

Blaenhirwaun Colliery was situated just outside Cefneithin and was near the extremity of the coalfield. It produced high grade anthracite with an output of about 350 tons per day. 360 people were employed below ground and 80 on the surface. It was served by two vertical shafts sunk to the Green Vein. The No.1 shaft was 10 feet (3.0 m) in diameter and 155 yards (142 m) deep and was the upcast. It was equipped with a Walker Paddle fan which produced about 55,000 cubic feet (1,600 m^{3}) of air per minute at a water gauge of 3.125 inches (79 mm). The No. 2 shaft was 13 feet (4.0 m) in diameter and 212 yards (194 m) deep and was the downcast and winding shaft for men and materials.

The former Colliery has been regenerated to become the Mynydd Mawr Woodland Park - a mix of broadleaved woodland and grassland which is home to a diverse collection of wildlife. The area includes footpaths, picnic facilities, information points and a track for mountain bikers and horseriders.

The National Cycle Network passes by Cefneithin RFC's playing field, "Cae Carwyn James," and cyclists can use this former railway line to reach the seaside locations of Llanelli and Burry Port.

== Notable people ==
- Gareth Davies, WRU chairman, played cricket for Cefneithin and Glamorgan 2nds, & rugby for British and Irish Lions
- Robert Dickie (1964–2010), professional boxer
- Carwyn James, rugby player and coach
- Barry John, rugby player
- Gwynoro Jones MP, played rugby for Cefneithin; became Member of Parliament at the age of 27
- Aneira Thomas, first baby born into NHS at 12:01 am on Monday 5 July 1948
- Ronnie Williams (1939–1997), actor and comedian
