= Gerald Williams (tennis commentator) =

British tennis commentator and journalist (1926–2016)

- Born: 24 June 1929; Surrey, England
- Died: 21 January 2016 (aged 86)
- Occupations: TV and radio tennis commentator, sports journalist
- Spouse: Joyce Barclay (1964–1972)

Gerald Williams (24 June 1929 – 21 January 2016) was a British tennis commentator and journalist. He wrote for the Croydon Advertiser and the Daily Mail before becoming a studio guest on the nightly round-up of Wimbledon coverage on BBC television from 1981 to 1989.

== Biography ==
Williams was born in Surrey and spent his teenage years in Llangynog in Carmarthenshire and Croydon in south London. Williams studied at Carmarthen Grammar School and joined the Croydon Advertiser after school, becoming the sports editor of the newspaper after a few years. Williams subsequently worked for the Daily Mail as a sub-editor having been recommended by his friend, the boxing commentator Harry Carpenter. Williams was appointed by the Daily Mail as its Manchester football correspondent after his predecessor, Eric Thompson, was killed in the Munich air disaster in 1958. In a 2011 interview, Williams said: "It was a strange feeling for a young man from London to be sitting in the press box at Old Trafford with the new Busby Babes. ...Half the football team had been wiped out but there was almost a spirituality about it."

ITV recruited Williams as a tennis commentator in the 1960s, a sport in which his interest was both professional and personal. Williams worked in tandem with Fred Perry as the network’s main voices. Football commentary was also part of the remit. From 1971, Williams worked on the Southern Soccer programme for Southern Television, and hosted and commentated on Soccer Special for HTV.

Williams was asked to become a radio tennis commentator by BBC executive Cliff Morgan, beginning regular broadcasts in 1974. Williams had learned how to project his voice through his experience of amateur dramatics, his fellow commentator Dan Maskell later told him of television commentators that "A lot of the time they tell you what you have just seen...And that is the worst thing you can do." Jim White later wrote in a 2016 tribute article for the Daily Telegraph that "Williams's ability to trust the audience to appreciate what was going on was one of his abiding strengths." Williams said of Maskell that he remembered "...doing a match on Centre Court in Wimbledon for the first time with Dan. I was in awe of him. He was such a lovely man. There's never been anyone like him. He became my best friend."

Williams was particularly associated with Des Lynam. After both Lynam and Williams worked for BBC Radio covering Wimbledon in the late 1970s, both joined Wimbledon's television coverage in the early 1980s. After initially appearing as a studio guest in the nightly highlights programme at Wimbledon with David Vine in 1981 and 1982, Williams appeared with Lynam from 1983 to 1989. Jim White described Williams and Lynam as making "an odd couple. Alongside Lynam's smooth, telegenic ease, Williams, with his unfashionable haircut and huge glasses, looked like a chemistry teacher who had taken a wrong turn on his way to the school lab." Williams left the BBC at the end of 1989 and worked as the lead tennis commentator for BSB in 1990 (BSB merged with Sky in November 1990) and Sky Sports from 1991 to 2001. Williams introduced the singer Cliff Richard to tennis player Sue Barker; Richard later considered marriage to Barker.

Williams was sympathetic to the tempestuous on-court behaviour of male tennis players in the 1980s including Jimmy Connors, John McEnroe, and Ilie Năstase, later saying in an interview: "Sometimes I'd be doing the commentary and criticising the players for their behaviour and I felt like a complete sham." Williams was also admonished by McEnroe himself, who told the umpire at the 1978 Davis Cup Final between the USA and Great Britain to "tell that Brit commentator to keep his voice down."

Williams spent his retirement in Bancyfelin, near Carmarthen in West Wales.
