= Llannon =

Village and community in Carmarthenshire, Wales

Coordinates: 51.7551°N 4.1175°W

- Village and community
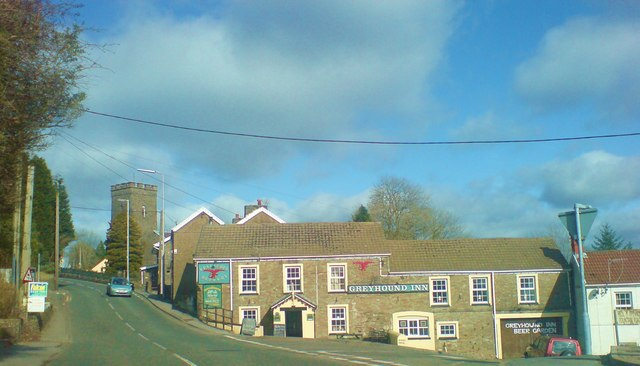
- Llannon village

- Location within Carmarthenshire
- Principal area: Carmarthenshire
- Country: Wales
- Sovereign state: United Kingdom
- Police: Dyfed-Powys
- Fire: Mid and West Wales
- Ambulance: Welsh
- List of places UK Wales Carmarthenshire Map of the community

Llannon is a village, community and electoral ward in Carmarthenshire, Wales. It is located on the A476 road 11 mi (18 km) south east of the county town, Carmarthen, between Tumble and Swiss Valley.

The community of Llannon contains Llannon village, Tumble and Cross Hands. The community is bordered by the communities of: Gorslas; Llandybie; Llanedi; Llangennech; Llanelli Rural; and Pontyberem, all being in Carmarthenshire. The community had a population of 5,270 as of the 2011 census.

== History and amenities ==
Llannon has deep historical links with the Rebecca Riots and there is rumoured to be a secret passage under the main road running through the village. This passage was said to have been used by Oliver Cromwell and possibly the Rebecca Rioters as an escape route. The passage runs from the Red Lion public house to the parish church.

Another public house, called the Greyhound Inn, lies on the Llannon to Hendy road junction. It is unknown which is older, but the road that the Greyhound Inn lies on has a watering fountain which was built to water horses of passing carts.

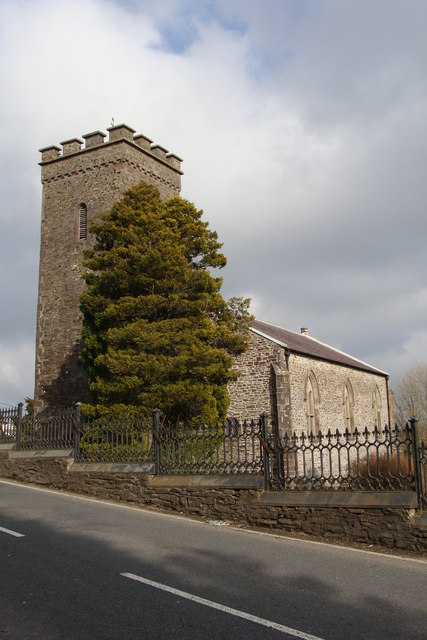
St Non's church

The parish church of Saint Non is a Grade II* listed building.

The village has a primary school and aside from the two pubs it lacks any other amenities such as a shop, which closed in the late 1990s. A refurbishment of the Greyhound Inn included the siting of a new village shop on the premises, but this closed shortly after it opened.

== Present day ==
The village has grown in recent years, with two new small housing estates having been constructed since 1999. The area is now considered more of a commuter village due to its proximity to the M4 in Hendy. The local school recently underwent a large extension programme to cope with the increased demand for schooling from the growing population.

There are plans to build another 48 houses in the village.

== Governance ==
At the most local level, Llannon is governed by the Llannon Community Council, electing community councillors from the wards of Cross Hands and Tumble.

Llannon is also an electoral ward to Carmarthenshire County Council, coterminous with the community. The ward elects two county councillors.

For 14 years, the ward was represented by Plaid Cymru's Emlyn Dole, who became leader of the county council for seven years. At the May 2022 election Dole lost his seat to fellow Plaid Cymru candidate, Llinos Mai Davies. Labour's Dot Jones won the second seat.
