= Jonathan Davies (rugby, born 1962) =

Sports broadcaster, former international rugby union and league footballer

Jonathan Davies CBE
Personal information
- Full name: Jonathan Davies
- Born: 24 October 1962 (age 63) Trimsaran, Carmarthenshire, Wales

Playing information
- Height: 5 ft 9 in (175 cm)
- Weight: 12 st 4 lb (78 kg)

Rugby union
- Position: Fly-half
Club
Years	Team	Pld	T	G	FG	P
1982–88	Neath	88	37			313
1988–89	Llanelli	33	23		11	363
1995–97	Cardiff	37	14		3	243
	Total	158	74	0	14	919
Representative
Years	Team	Pld	T	G	FG	P
1985–97	Wales	37	5	8	13	81

Rugby league
- Position: Fullback, Wing, Centre, Five-eighth
Club
Years	Team	Pld	T	G	FG	P
1989–93	Widnes	126	78	224	4	1180
1991	Canterbury Bulldogs	14	7	36	0	100
1993–95	Warrington	66	43	232	26	662
1995	North Qld Cowboys	9	1	19	1	43
	Total	215	129	511	31	1985
Representative
Years	Team	Pld	T	G	FG	P
1989–94	Great Britain	10	3	31	2	76
1993–95	Wales	9	3	39	5	75

Jonathan Davies, CBE (born 24 October 1962) is a Welsh former rugby union and rugby league footballer who played in the 1980s and 1990s, and who represented Wales in both rugby union and rugby league. A goal-kicking back, he played his club rugby in Wales, England and Australia. Nicknamed 'Jiffy', Davies has since become a television commentator for both codes, in both the Welsh and English languages.

== Biography ==
Jonathan Davies was born in Trimsaran, Carmarthenshire, on 24 October 1962, the son of Diana and Len Davies. Davies' father worked in Trostre, Llanelli, and his mother was a home-maker. Davies started school at Trimsaran Primary School, where he was part of the Welsh medium class. His teacher Meirion Davies introduced him to rugby, and he started playing sevens. He attended Gwendraeth Grammar School, where he met his first wife Karen Hopkins, whom he married ten years later.

=== Rugby union ===
In 1974 Davies played for the very first time at Cardiff Arms Park, when he was chosen for the West Wales Under 12s. He started his career at amateur level with Trimsaran RFC. His father Len had also played for and captained Trimsaran Rugby Club. Age 17, Davies left school and became an apprentice painter and decorator. After developing at Trimsaran, he was given a trial with Llanelli but was rejected. Neath gave him another chance and he signed with them in 1982, selected to play at fly-half.

After 35 games for Neath, Davies was selected to play for Wales, against England at the Cardiff Arms Park. After scoring a try and a drop goal, Davies was named Man of the Match in the Welsh victory. He was made captain at Neath before being transferred to Llanelli. In 1988 Davies played a part in the Triple Crown success for Wales and between 1985 and 1997 he won 37 rugby union caps. Injuries during the 1988 New Zealand tour meant Davies captained the side in four games. The two tests were lost by fifty point margins, although Davies did score a 90 m (300 ft) try in the second.

Davies was blamed in the media for the surprising Welsh defeat by Romania. As Llanelli placed pressure on him from the WRU to commit himself wholeheartedly to them, and despite being widely touted as the first choice fly-half for the upcoming British Lions tour to Australia, he decided for the best interests of his family to move to the rugby league team Widnes, who signed him for a record fee of £230,000.

Davies was recruited into rugby league by Jim Mills and Doug Laughton. He would later return to rugby union.

=== Rugby league ===
==== Widnes ====
Davies started his professional rugby league career during the 1989–90 Rugby Football League season with defending champions Widnes. He played for them as a centre in their 1989 World Club Challenge victory against the visiting Canberra Raiders. He was selected to play for Great Britain during the 1989–1992 Rugby League World Cup tournament. During the 1990–91 season Davies played left-centre and scored 4 conversions in Widnes' 24–18 victory over Salford in the 1990 Lancashire Cup Final at Central Park, Wigan on Saturday 29 September 1990.

==== Canterbury-Bankstown Bulldogs ====
In 1991, Davies took on a further challenge when he spent the summer in Sydney playing in the 1991 NSWRL season for the Canterbury-Bankstown Bulldogs. Davies played mostly as a fullback for the Canterbury side who were struggling to make the Semi-finals. He made an impact with the 'Dogs, scoring 100 points in his 14 games for the club (7 tries, 36 goals), including a personal haul of 18 points (2 tries, 5 goals) in the last round of the season against Cronulla at Canterbury's home ground, Belmore Sports Ground. Needing a win to force a 5th place playoff with Western Suburbs, Canterbury-Bankstown got off to a slow start and Cronulla took a 16–0 half time lead. Canterbury scored 26 unanswered points in the second half to win 26–16. In the playoff with Wests, Davies first stint in Australia came to an end with Wests winning 19–14.

==== Widnes ====
Davies played stand-off, and scored a try, 3 conversions, and a drop goal in Widnes 24–0 victory over Leeds in the 1991–92 Regal Trophy Final during the 1991–92 season at Central Park, Wigan on Saturday 11 January 1992.

==== Warrington ====
After Widnes got into financial difficulties, in 1993 he transferred to their local rivals Warrington. He was named player of the 1993–94 season, winning the RFL's Man of Steel Award.

During the 1994–95 Rugby Football League season Davies played fullback, and scored a conversion in Warrington's 10–40 defeat by Wigan in the 1994–95 League Cup Final at Alfred McAlpine Stadium, Huddersfield on Saturday 28 January 1995.

==== North Queensland Cowboys ====
Davies again played in Australia when he signed with the newly-formed North Queensland Cowboys in 1995. He was unable to get to Australia until midway through the 1995 Winfield Cup Premiership. He scored a full field try against the Newcastle Knights in Newcastle. Davies finished the season as the club's top scorer with 43 points.

==== International ====
Davies captained Great Britain in the 30–12 win over France on 16 Feb 1992 in Perpignan.

During his time in rugby league he represented both Great Britain and Wales, scoring a solo try in Great Britain's last victory over the Kangaroos at the old Wembley in 1994 where he sprinted 50 metres to score in the corner out-pacing Australian fullback Brett Mullins. Although he left the field with a dislocated shoulder during the second half, his efforts in both attack and defence (which saw him pull off two try-saving tackles) saw him named as man of the match. The shoulder injury kept him out of the rest of The Ashes series (eventually won 2–1 by Australia) as well as prevented him from playing for Wales in a friendly against the Kangaroos in Cardiff. With the Rugby Football League splitting the Great Britain team into individual nations (Wales, England, Scotland and Ireland) from 1995, the test at Wembley was the last time Davies represented Great Britain in rugby league.

Davies' last rugby league match was as captain of Wales against England in the 1995 World Cup Semi-final at Old Trafford, which Wales lost 25–10. Playing as a stand-off, Davies kicked 3 goals for Wales taking his total score for Wales to 21 points (10 goals, 1 field goal), all scored in the 1995 World Cup.

=== Return to rugby union ===
After the birth of daughter Geena in 1995, Davies' wife Karen was diagnosed with cancer. In need of family support, and as rugby union had turned professional, Davies went back to South Wales and signed to play for Cardiff RFC. On a guest appearance on A Question of Sport in 1995 he was asked what the biggest change was after returning to rugby union. Davies replied: "It's the first time I've been cold for seven years. I was never cold playing rugby league."

=== After rugby ===
Since retiring from rugby, Davies has worked in the media as a commentator and pundit in both codes, mainly for the BBC in both the English and Welsh languages. He is known for his spirited support of Wales during commentary and regularly faces accusations of bias from viewers. Since 2004 Davies has hosted his own rugby themed chatshow, Jonathan, on S4C, usually before Welsh international matches. Davies was also the President of Super League side Crusaders, until 2009, when he was replaced by David Watkins.

As of 2024, Davies is the brand ambassador for energy efficiency company, Consumer Energy Solutions, based in Swansea.

He is a supporter of the Wooden Spoon charity.

=== Recognition ===
Davies was appointed a Member of the Order of the British Empire (MBE) in the 1995 New Year Honours for services to rugby league football. In the 2015 Birthday Honours, he was promoted to Officer of the same order (OBE), "for voluntary and charitable services to People with Cancer," in recognition of his work as President of Cardiff's Velindre Cancer Centre. In the 2026 King's New Year Honours List, he became a CBE.

== Playing records ==
All-Time Club Performance
Clubs	Season	Games	Tries	Goals	Drop Goals	Points	Comment
Cardiff	1996-7						Retired at end of season
Cardiff	1995-6
Total		9	1	19	1	43
North Queensland Cowboys	1995	9	1	19	1	43
Total		9	1	19	1	43
Warrington	1995-6	8	4	29	3	77
Warrington	1994-5	29	18	104	12	292
Warrington	1993-4	30	21	99	11	293
Total		67	43	232	26	662
Canterbury Bulldogs	1991	14	7	36	-	100
Total		14	7	36	–	100
Widnes	1988–89	12(4)	7	47	1	123
Widnes	1989–90	29(1)	14	98	0	252
Widnes	1990–91	32(2)	30	110	2	342
Widnes	1991–92	24	13	73	1	199
Widnes	1992–93	29(1)	14	106	0	268
Total		126(8)	78	434	4	1184
Career Totals
