= Nigel Davies (rugby union) =

Wales international rugby union player (born 1965)

- Born: Nigel Gareth Davies; 29 March 1965 (age 61) Trimsaran, Wales
- Height: 1.85 m (6 ft 1 in)
- Weight: 91 kg (14 st 5 lb)
- School: Ysgol y Strade
- University: Polytechnic of Wales
- Notable relative: Sam Davies (son)

Rugby union career
- Position: Centre
Amateur team(s)
Years	Team	Apps	(Points)
1983–2000	Llanelli RFC	498	(487)
International career
Years	Team	Apps	(Points)
1987–1997	Wales	29	(23)
Coaching career
- Years: Team
- 2007: Wales
- 2008–2012: Llanelli Scarlets
- 2012-2014: Gloucester Rugby
- 2015–2017: Ebbw Vale RFC

Nigel Gareth Davies (born 29 March 1965) is a former Wales international rugby union player, who played his club rugby at Llanelli RFC.

== Playing career ==
Davies was born in Waun y Clun, Trimsaran and as a youth player played for local rugby union club Trimsaran RFC. In his final year of playing for the youth team he was invited by Llanelli RFC to play for them in a friendly match, from which he impressed enough to be selected by the club. Davies played 498 games for Llanelli including nine WRU Challenge Cup finals. During his Llanelli career he scored 115 tries and 487 points in total. Nigel also scored 5 tries whilst playing centre for Wales in 29 appearances.

== Coaching career ==
Davies was appointed assistant coach to the Wales national team under Gareth Jenkins and was appointed caretaker Head Coach following the departure of Jenkins after the 2007 Rugby World Cup. In May 2008 Davies was announced as the head coach of the Scarlets, replacing Phil Davies who moved to the Scarlets board of directors.

In June 2012 Davies joined Gloucester as Director of Rugby. After a poor season in 2013–14, Davies was sacked by Gloucester.

In June 2015 Davies was announced as the head coach of Ebbw Vale RFC. He spent two seasons with the club, before departing in May 2017 to take over as chief executive at Merthyr RFC. He departed the role by 2020, when he twice ran and lost for a seat on the WRU National Council.

In January 2026, Davies returned to the Scarlets as interim Director of Rugby, taking some responsibilities from struggling head coach Dwayne Peel.

== Personal life ==
His son Sam Davies is a professional rugby union player.
