= Llyn Llech Owain =

Lake in Carmarthenshire, Wales

Coordinates: 51.8160°N 4.0780°W

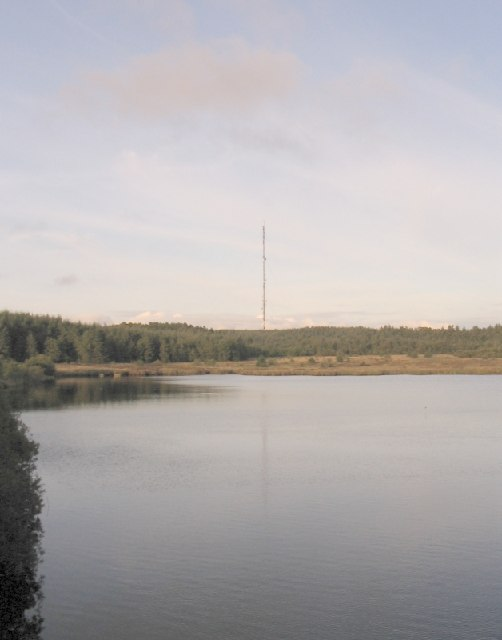
Llyn Llech Owain in 2004

Llyn Llech Owain is a shallow lake with an area of 3.5 hectares (8.6 acres) which gives its name to the country park in which it sits, it is also a Site of Special Scientific Interest which was designated in 1993. The country park is managed by Carmarthenshire County Council and has an area of 73 hectares (180 acres). The park is near the village of Gorslas with its entrance on Church Road.

== Etymology ==
The name of the lake Llyn Llech Owain translates into English as "the lake of Owain's slab". The identity of the Owain referred to is not certain but local legend has it to be a Welsh mercenary, called Owain Lawgoch or "Owain of the Red hand", who commanded a company of French troops against the English during the Hundred Years War. According to this tale Owain was tasked with looking after a well, called Mynydd Mawr. on the nearby mountain. Each day he extracted enough water for himself and his horse, carefully replacing the slab over the well but one day he forgot to replace the slab and a torrent poured down the slope, creating the lake.

== Description ==
Llyn Llech Owain is the centrepiece of the country park which surrounds it. Other habitats within the park include peat bog, coniferous woodland, broad-leaved woodland and heathland. The lake and its associated acidic meadows are relatively rare habitats within Carmarthenshire and were the main reasons for its designation as an SSSI in 1993. There is extensive peat underlying the lake's catchment area and the water in the lake has a very brown colour and this means the lake could be classified as dystrophic.

There is a network of footpaths throughout the Country Park and many of these are well surfaced and accessible to wheelchair users. There are also boardwalks which allow safe access over the peat bog and around the lake. The visitor centre which sits beside the lake has exhibits providing information about the park.

== Wildlife ==
The woodlands provide habitat for a typical range of woodland birds such as tits, goldcrest, Common treecreeper, Eurasian jay and green woodpecker, this includes a good population of willow tit. The heathland is home to common kestrel, common buzzard, common lizard and grass snake. There is an abundance of insects and these include dragonflies and damselflies which provide prey for migrating hobbies. the woodlands are also home to a population hazel dormouse and nest boxes are being provided for this species within the park.

== See also ==
- List of Sites of Special Scientific Interest in Carmarthen & Dinefwr
