= Ernie Finch =

Wales international rugby union footballer

- Born: Ernest Finch; 16 July 1899 Pembroke Dock, Wales
- Died: 1 October 1983 (aged 84) Haverfordwest, Wales
- School: Pembroke Dock County School
- University: Monmouth Training college

Rugby union career
- Position: Wing
Amateur team(s)
Years	Team	Apps	(Points)
- Caerleon RFC
- Pembroke Dock Harlequins
1922-?	Llanelli RFC		
–	Western Counties		
International career
Years	Team	Apps	(Points)
1924–1928	Wales	7	(12)

Ernie Finch (16 July 1899 - 1 October 1983) was a Welsh international rugby union wing and played club rugby for Llanelli and county rugby for the Western Counties. Finch is most notable as the player who scored an excellent solo try against the 1924 touring New Zealand 'Invincibles' in their match against Llanelli.

Born Ernest Finch in Pembroke Dock to Abram and Emily Finch. His father was a retired police officer who upon moving to Wales and marrying Emily, his second wife, became a school board attendance monitor.

== Rugby career ==
Finch first played senior rugby for local team Pembroke Dock Harlequins before moving to first class team Llanelli in 1922. Finch was first selected for Wales in the late game of the 1924 Five Nations Championship in an away game to France. Although Wales won, it was a messy Welsh performance caused by the decision of the Welsh Rugby Union officials to suspend Welsh player Ossie Male on the trip to Paris. The squad was thrown into turmoil, with several players being forced into unfamiliar positions. Finch managed to get his name on the scoreboard during the game when he scored one of two Welsh tries.

Finch was re-selected for the next Welsh international, this time against the touring New Zealand team. Wales were completely outclassed and lost the game 19-0, and Finch would face the All Blacks just four days later as his Llanelli team played host to the tourists. The New Zealanders faced far stiffer opposition as Llanelli went on the offensive. The forwards tackled with ferocity and Llanelli may have won with better kicking accuracy. In the match, Finch scored Llanelli's only points with a memorable solo try. Finch took a quick line-out, took the returning ball and left Hart flat-footed as he sped past him. With the try line in sight the only All Black defender was George Nēpia. As Nēpia closed in, Finch stopped dead, Nēpia paused and then threw a tackle which Finch dodged, leaving him a clear try line to score over.

Finch was back in the Welsh squad in 1925 when he again faced France in the Five Nations Championship, this time in Wales at the Cardiff Arms Park. It was a more convincing Welsh performance and Finch scored two tries in an 11-5 victory. Finch held onto his place for the season's final Welsh international against Ireland, but found himself on the losing side against an impressive Irish team. In 1926 he played just one match, as part of Bobby Delahay's Welsh team to France, which Wales were narrow victors.

Finch missed all off the 1927 Championship for Wales, but was selected to face the touring Waratahs towards the end of the season; and although Wales lost, Finch managed his fourth and final international try for his country. Finch's final game for his country was in 1928 in Paris and it saw the first Welsh defeat by the French team. Five players from the game never represented their country again, and Finch was one of them.

=== International matches played ===
Wales

- France 1924, 1925, 1926
- Ireland 1925, 1928
- (Australia) New South Wales Waratahs 1927
- New Zealand 1924

== Bibliography ==
- Billot, John (1972). All Blacks in Wales. Ferndale: Ron Jones Publications.
- Smith, David; Williams, Gareth (1980). Fields of Praise: The Official History of The Welsh Rugby Union. Cardiff: University of Wales Press. ISBN 0-7083-0766-3.
