= Gweunydd Glan-y-glasnant =

Protected area in Carmarthenshire, Wales

- Site of Special Scientific Interest
- Location within Carmarthenshire
- Location of Gweunydd Glan-y-glasnant.
- Area of search: Carmarthenshire
- Grid reference: SN555116
- Coordinates: 51.784068°N 4.095592°W
- Area: 12.5 hectares (31 acres)
- Notification date: 1993

Gweunydd Glan-y-glasnant is a Site of Special Scientific Interest (SSSI) in Carmarthenshire, Wales, designated in 1993 for its botanical features.

== SSSI ==
Gweunydd Glan-y-glasnant SSSI is a set of unimproved cattle-grazed pasture and hay meadows, extending to 12.5 hectares (31 acres), on varying thicknesses of glacial till overlaying coal measures and shaley sandstone. It is situated at 175 metres (574 ft) above sea level in the upper valley of the Nant Glas, a tributary of the River Gwili, 0.8 miles (1.3 km) south-west of Cross Hands and 0.6 miles (0.97 km) east of Tumble.

The site is designated as an SSSI for its species-rich neutral grassland, rare now in Great Britain with 97% of such land lost through agricultural improvements since 1930. Such fields provide habitat for up to 30 distinct species of plant per square metre, in contrast with the 1 or 2 species per square metre on improved grassland fields. The site varies from pH neutral mesotrophic soil to damper acidic grassland.

Species common on the neutral grasslands include common bent (Agrostis capillaris), sweet vernal-grass (Anthoxanthum odoratum), clovers (Trifolium), common knapweed (Centaurea nigra) and bird's-foot-trefoil (Lotus corniculatus). There are smaller communities of tormentil (Potentilla erecta), meadow vetchling (Lathyrus pratensis), yarrow (Achillea millefolium), self-heal (Prunella vulgaris), as well as common spotted-orchid (Dactylorhiza fuchsii) and the adder's-tongue fern (Ophioglossum vulgatum). A distinct part of the site is a fen-meadow hosting purple moor-grass (Molinia caerulea) and meadow thistle (Cirsium dissectum).

A range of other habitats on the site, including acid grassland, scrub, semi-natural broadleaved woodland, hedgerows, individual trees, earthbank field boundaries, streams, ditches and rock outcrops support a broad range of fauna.

== See also ==
- List of Sites of Special Scientific Interest in Carmarthenshire
