= Bancyfelin =

Village in Carmarthenshire, Wales

Coordinates: 51.8345°N 4.4354°W

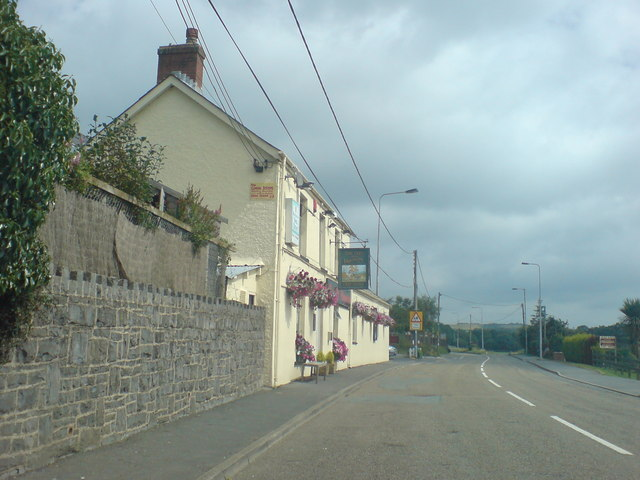
- The Fox and Hounds pub in 2008

- Location within Carmarthenshire
- OS grid reference: SN323180
- Community: St Clears
- Principal area: Carmarthenshire
- Preserved county: Dyfed
- Country: Wales
- Sovereign state: United Kingdom
- Post town: Carmarthen
- Postcode district: SA33
- Dialling code: 01267
- Police: Dyfed-Powys
- Fire: Mid and West Wales
- Ambulance: Welsh
- UK Parliament: Caerfyrddin
- Senedd Cymru – Welsh Parliament: Carmarthen West and South Pembrokeshire
- Website: Village website

Bancyfelin is a village, 5 miles (8.0 km) west of Carmarthen, Wales. The English translation of the Welsh name is Hillside of the Mill. There is no remnant of the mill today.

The village is known for producing international sporting stars despite having a population of only 300 or so people. These include three British & Irish Lions rugby players from Bancyfelin, Delme Thomas, Mike Phillips and Jonathan Davies. When The Lions toured Australia in the 2013 British & Irish Lions tour, all 3 of the 23-man squads to play Australia had more players from Bancyfelin than from Scotland.

Up until the 1980s when the A40 dual carriageway bypass opened, the village was plagued by traffic jams in the summer months due to holidaymakers driving to the West Wales coast. The village is located mainly on the old A40 with the exception of the Council Estate built on a nearby hill. The village has gradually expanded with the building of houses on the outskirts.

There is a small primary school, a post office, a pub, a chapel, a garage and Hafod Bakery, a family run bakery which has been baking bread for 60 years.

Werndale Hospital, run by BMI Healthcare, is located at the western end of the village.

== People from Bancyfelin ==
- James 'Cubby' Davies – rugby player
- Jonathan Davies – rugby player
- Charles Lynn Davies – rugby player
- James Ira Thomas Jones – pilot, buried in Sarnau Chapel
- Mike Phillips – rugby player
- Byron Rogers – journalist and author
- Aled Thomas - rugby player
- Delme Thomas – rugby player
- Gerald Williams – tennis commentator and journalist
