= Walter Jenkins (civil servant) =

British official in the Admiralty and civil servant

Sir Walter St David Jenkins CB CBE (1 March 1874 – 7 June 1951) was a senior British official in the Admiralty, serving as Director of Navy Contracts from 1919 to 1936. Jenkins was born on 1 March 1874 and educated at Carmarthen Grammar School and Oswestry School. He won a Meyricke exhibition to Jesus College, Oxford in 1893, obtaining his Bachelor of Arts degree in 1897 before joining the Admiralty as a first-class clerk.

From 1902 to 1906, he was secretary of the committee that recommended the introduction of oil as the fuel for warships – he later drafted the Admiralty's report for presentation to the Royal Commission on Oil Fuel – whilst also spending time travelling to India and Burma to arrange for stores to be supplied to British naval stations in the Far East and to obtain teak for the Admiralty. He was commended by the First Lord of the Admiralty (Winston Churchill) for securing naval coal supplies in anticipation of a miners' strike in south Wales. He was Admiralty secretary of the Railway Communications Board that drew up the plan for taking over the railways using the powers contained in the Defence of the Realm Act. He served on various inter-departmental committees during the First World War, and was appointed by the Government as a director of the Anglo-Persian Oil Company in 1918, resigning to become Director of Navy Contracts in 1919. He remained in this post until retirement in 1936, thereafter working in the commercial sector. He also became the first independent chairman of the National Federation of Iron and Steel Merchants (1938–1944). He was appointed a Commander of the Order of the British Empire (1918) and a Companion of the Order of the Bath (1921) before being knighted on his retirement in 1936. He was also appointed an Officer of the Légion d'honneur (1918) and an Officer of the Order of the Crown of Italy (1918), as well as being awarded the Order of St Anne of Russia. He died in London on 7 June 1951.
