= Byron Rogers (author) =

Welsh essayist and biographer (1942–2025)

Byron Rogers

Byron Davies Rogers (5 April 1942 – 3 August 2025) was a Welsh journalist, essayist, historian and biographer and recipient of the 1998 Professional Publishers Association (PPA) Writer of the Year Award and the James Tait Black Memorial Prize for the best biography of 2006.

About Rogers' prize-winning biography, The Man Who Went into the West: The Life of RS Thomas the Archbishop of Canterbury, Rowan Williams, wrote, "Byron Rogers's lively and affectionate biography is unexpectedly, even riotously, funny." As a freelance feature writer for newspapers it was said that Rogers wrote with "magnificent flamboyance".

== Life and career ==
Byron Rogers was born on 5 April 1942 near the south Wales village of Bancyfelin in Carmarthenshire. He spoke only Welsh to the age of five. His father Bryn was a carpenter. He attended Queen Elizabeth Grammar School, Carmarthen, and read English literature at Aberystwyth University. He gained a scholarship for further study at University College, Oxford.

Rogers began his journalistic career at the Sheffield Star in 1965, where he was given a daily column in which, he recalled, he eschewed "the usual current affairs served up like yesterday's roast" and wrote about himself. He moved London, working for The Times in 1967, and went from there to editor John Anstey's Telegraph Magazine, where he began a career of feature writing which expanded to freelance work for The Daily Telegraph, The Sunday Telegraph, The Guardian and The Sunday Express .

Byron Rogers moved to Northamptonshire, living in the village of Blakesley, near Towcester. From 1978 to 1983 he was a speechwriter for the then Prince of Wales, now King Charles III. His also wrote regularly for Saga magazine, for which he devised the thinly disguised figure of "The Traveller" so as to write more for the publication. In 1998 Rogers was awarded the PPA Writer of the Year Award for, including others, his Saga work.

It has been written of Rogers' essays that he was "a historian of the quirky and forgotten, of people and places other journalists don't even know exist or ignore if they do". His literary debut, An Audience with an Elephant, published in 2001, was well received. He published three further collections of journalism, including The Bank Manager and the Holy Grail in 2003 and The Last Human Cannonball in 2004.

Aged nearly 60, Rogers was commissioned to write a biography of "quixotic novelist and head teacher" J. L. Carr, who also lived in Northamptonshire. The book was published as The Last Englishman in 2003 and was praised by Times writer Simon Jenkins as "a miniature masterpiece of social history". A second biography, The Man Who went into the West, published in 2006, a life of Welsh poet and vicar R. S. Thomas, won the James Tait Black Memorial Prize for biography in August 2007 and was described by Craig Brown in The Times as "the most enjoyable biography ever written".

Rogers married Joanna Blagden in 1982. They had one daughter.

Byron Rogers died from a stroke on 3 August 2025. He was 83.

== Bibliography ==
=== Essays ===
- An Audience with an Elephant, Aurum, 2001.
- The Green Lane to Nowhere: the Life of an English Village, Aurum, 2002.
- The Bank Manager and the Holy Grail: travels to the wilder reaches of Wales, Aurum, 2003.
- The Last Human Cannonball and Other Small Journeys in Search of Great Men, Aurum, 2004.
- Three Journeys, Gomer Press, 2011.

=== Biography ===
- The Last Englishman, the Life of J. L. Carr, Aurum, 2003.
- The Man Who Went into the West, the Life of R. S. Thomas, Aurum, 2006.
- Me: The Authorised Biography, Aurum, 2009.

=== History ===
- The Lost Children, Gregynog, 2005.
