= Roy Bish =

Welsh rugby union player and coach

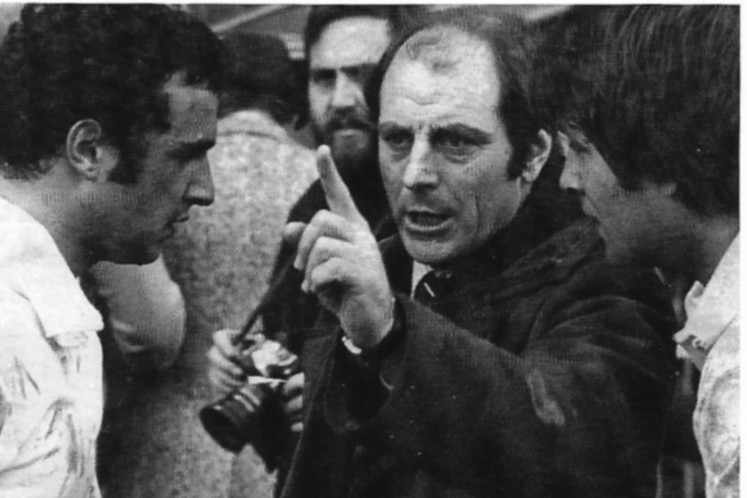
- Roy Bish coaching Italy at Stadio Flaminio during a European Nations Cup match against France. with Ennio Ponzi and Elio de Anna,
- Born: Roy Bish

Rugby union career
- Position: Centre
Senior career
Years	Team	Apps	(Points)
–	Aberavon RFC		
1954	Neath & Aberavon XV		
Coaching career
- Years: Team
- –: Cardiff RFC
- –: Oxford University RFC
- 1975–1977: Italy

Roy Bish was a Welsh rugby union player and coach of the Italy national rugby union team

== Biography ==
=== Early life and playing career ===
Born in Port Talbot, Bish attended the local grammar school, winning three secondary schools caps for Wales in 1948, playing at centre in a star-studded back division that also included Carwyn James, Lewis Jones and Trevor Brewer.

He played most of his senior club rugby with Aberavon but also played He also played county rugby for both Glamorgan and Devon and in the combined Aberavon & Neath XV that lost 5–11 to a touring New Zealand side in January 1954.

=== Coaching career ===
In 1965 he became the first qualified coach of Cardiff RFC combining his new role with his professional career as the senior lecturer in physical education at Cardiff Training College where he worked with a young student player named Gareth Edwards. In his second year at Cardiff, Bish oversaw the defeat of the touring Australian side in 1966 Bish's Cardiff side became known for their brand of 15-man attacking rugby featuring players such as Maurice Richards, Keri and Ken Jones, Gerald Davies and later, both Gareth Edwards and Barry John.

Bish also coached the Oxford University RFC side for the The Varsity Match before a number of Italian rugby clubs showed interest in him. Bish returned to Aberavon as head coach for the 1983–84 season.

=== Death and tributes ===
Bish died on 7 November, 2006. Following his death Bish was described by Gareth Edwards as "a meticulous organiser, great thinker, and someone who will be badly missed as a gentleman" Edwards went on to say "I remember people being upset we had a coach at all, they felt the game should be free-flowing. Italy saw his worth and took him there. In the modern age, Roy would be a national hero."

== See also ==
- Carwyn James
- Italy National Rugby Union Coach

Sporting positions
Preceded by (Italy) Gianni Villa	Italy National Rugby Union Coach; 1975–1977	Succeeded by (Italy) Isidoro Quaglio
