= Ysgol Maes Y Gwendraeth =

Coordinates: 51.8028°N 4.0907°W

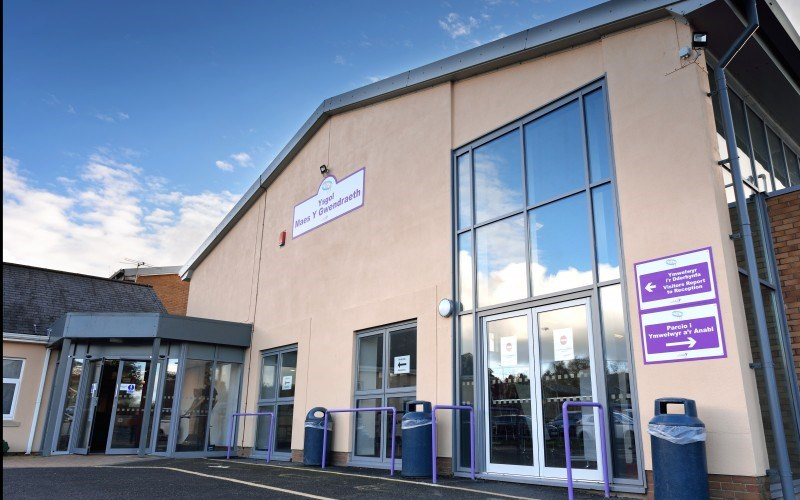
- Entrance to the school

Location
- 24 Heol Y Parc; Cefneithin, Carmarthenshire, SA14 7DT; Wales

Information
- Type: Comprehensive School
- Motto: Cyfoeth Bywyd Addysg
- Established: 2013
- Local authority: Carmarthenshire County Council
- Headteacher: Arwyn Thomas
- Gender: Male and Female
- Age: 11 to 19
- Enrollment: 1110 (2024)
- Language: Bilingual (Type A)
- Website: http://www.maesygwendraeth.org

Ysgol Maes Y Gwendraeth is a bilingual secondary school for pupils aged between 11 and 18 years, situated in Cefneithin, Carmarthenshire, Wales. The school was opened following the amalgamation of Ysgol Maes yr Yrfa and Ysgol y Gwendraeth secondary schools in 2013. As of 2024, there are 1110 pupils on roll at the school.

Welsh is the official language of the school on a daily basis and is the administrative and social medium of communication. The school is categorized linguistically by Welsh Government as a category 2A school. It means that at least 80% of subjects apart from English and Welsh are taught only through the medium of Welsh to all pupils. However, one or two subjects are taught to some pupils in English or in both languages. The school states that all subjects are taught through the medium of Welsh, excluding English and Science (which is taught through the pupils’ chosen language from Year 8 onwards).

== Alumni ==
- Jonathan Edwards (Welsh politician) Welsh politician who serves as the independent Member of Parliament (MP) for Carmarthen East and Dinefwr since 2010. Studied at Ysgol Maes Yr Yrfa before it amalgamated into Maes Y Gwendraeth. Elected as a Plaid Cymru MP, he had the whip withdrawn in May 2020 after he accepted a police caution for domestic violence against his wife. As of January 2023, he and his wife are reportedly divorced.
