= W. J. A. Davies =

England international rugby union footballer & naval architect (1890-1967)

Dave Davies
- Born: William John Abbott Davies; 21 June 1890 Pembroke, Pembrokeshire, Wales
- Died: 26 April 1967 (aged 76) (registered in) Richmond (aged 76 years 309 days)

Rugby union career
- Position: Fly-half
Senior career
Years	Team	Apps	(Points)
- Pembroke Dock Harlequins
–	United Services Portsmouth RFC		
–	Navy		
International career
Years	Team	Apps	(Points)
1913–1923	England	22	(24)

William John Abbott "Dave" Davies OBE (21 June 1890 – 26 April 1967) was a Welsh rugby union footballer who played international rugby for England normally positioned at fly-half. He also captained his country.

He combined his outstanding rugby career with a highly successful career as a naval architect.

== Rugby career ==
Davies was born in Pembroke, Wales, and originally played for Pembroke Dock Harlequins. Davies made his international debut on 4 January 1913 at Twickenham in the England vs South Africa match. He was part of the England team that won the Grand Slam in both 1921 and 1923.

During his time playing he earned 22 caps, making him England's most capped fly-half until Rob Andrew overtook him. He played half of his matches as captain. During his 22 matches at international level, he was on a losing side only in the first, against South Africa in 1913.

He formed a notable international half-back partnership with his Royal Navy team-mate Cecil Kershaw; in their 14 matches together for England they never finished on the losing side.

== Personal life ==
Outside of rugby, Davies began his working life as an apprentice in Pembroke Dockyard in 1905. He was selected to study for the Royal Corps of Naval Constructors in 1909 and studied naval architecture at the Royal Naval College, Greenwich starting in 1910.

During World War I, he served on the staff of the Commander-in-Chief, Grand Fleet, aboard HMS Iron Duke and HMS Queen Elizabeth. He was appointed OBE in 1919. He continued his Admiralty career retiring in 1950 as Director of Merchant Shipbuilding and Repairs.

Davies was offered the chance to play at Wimbledon, but declined the offer to focus on his rugby.

Davies had two children.

Sporting positions
Preceded by John Eric Greenwood; Bruno Brown	English National Rugby Union Captain; 1921; Feb 1922-1923	Succeeded by Bruno Brown; William Wavell Wakefield
