= Foelgastell =

Village and community in Carmarthenshire, Wales

Coordinates: 51.8129°N 4.1114°W

Foelgastell (Welsh pronunciation) is a village and community in the county Carmarthenshire, west Wales. The village has seen much new building of comparatively expensive housing over the past two decades and is within the electoral ward Gorslas to the west of the social-housing area Cefneithin.
