= Pembroke RFC =

(Wales) Pembroke RFC
- Full name: Pembroke Rugby Football Club
- Nickname: The Scarlets
- Founded: 1896 (c)
- Location: Pembroke, Wales
- Ground: Crickmarren (Capacity: 200)
- Coach(es): (Wales) Gary Price (Wales) Darren Gilbert
- League: WRU Division Three West A
- 2017–18: 1st (champions)
1st kit	2nd kit

Official website
- www.pitchero.com/clubs/pembroke/

Pembroke Rugby Football Club is a Welsh rugby union team based in Pembroke. They currently play in the Welsh National League Division Five West and are a feeder club for the Llanelli Scarlets. They are known locally as the Scarlets relating to the colour of their shirts.

== History ==
Pembroke Rugby Football Club was established in 1896. It celebrated its centenary in the 1996–1997 season with a centenary dinner held in a marquee on the club ground. David Vaughan (Dunvant) was the chief guest.

The club was not granted Welsh Rugby Union status until 1919, immediately after World War I.

Between the Wars the club competed in the local cup and league competitions. In 1922–23 the club were the K.O Cup Winners whilst in 1935–36 it repeated this feat in becoming the West of Llanelly K.O. Cup Winners.

After the Second World War, the club resumed its activities and in 1947–48 under the captaincy of Chris Leonard, became the Pembrokeshire and District League K.O. Champions.

This feat was repeated in 1960–61 under the captaincy of Derek Hayward. Unfortunately this is the last occasion on which the K.O. Cup has come to Crickmarren.

1954–55 was probably one of the most successful in the club's history under the vigorous captaincy of John Shanklin the team were both the Pembrokeshire and District League Champions and runners up in the K.O. Cup tournament.

This period in the club's history also saw the club win the county 7-a-side tournament on several occasions.

== Homeground ==
Pembroke RFC play all their home games at the Crickmarren Field located on Upper Lamphey Road. There is a stand with seating on one side of the pitch. Also located here is the clubhouse and changing rooms. There is also a training pitch located down the lane behind the rugby club and also a small pitch designed for Mini-Rugby known as 'The Cage' due to the wire fence around its perimeter.

== Kit ==
Pembroke RFC traditionally play in scarlet coloured shirts with white shorts and scarlet socks. As for their away kit they play in a green and red style.

== League ==
Pembroke were promoted from Division 6 West at the end of the 2003/04 season and moved to Division 5 West. They were also promoted the following season to Division 4 West for the 2005/06 season.

== Cups ==
Pembroke have been victorious in the Pembrokeshire K.O. Cup on several occasions. These were in the 1922–23, 1935–36, 1947–48 and 1960–61 seasons.

== Rivalries ==
Pembroke's main rival is Pembroke Dock Harlequins RFC (known as the Quins), although there are fierce rivalries with the other Pembrokeshire teams.

== Individual honours ==
The Club has seen many of their products gain various international honours. Beginning with Randall Huzzey, who won his Welsh Schoolboy Cap from East-End School in 1931, the club has seen several of its members win caps in both schools and youth international matches. It is also proud to have Junior Rugby Union internationals in its ranks, whilst three of its products went on to gain senior Welsh international caps with Jonathan Thomas still participating in an active role with the Welsh team. Mike Knill – with Cardiff. Robert Appleyard – with Swansea. Jonathan Thomas – with Ospreys

After World War II, Pembroke was also fortunate to gain the services of Eddie Woodgate who gained an England Cap before coming to reside in Pembroke from Devon.

In later years two of the club's exiles gained international honours playing for Luxembourg. Peter Doyle and Philip Williams.

== 1st team ==
Coaches: Geraint Lewis

Props:

Tom Jones, Richard Morris, Richard Mason, Seamus Wiseman, Jamie Brayford, Sean Willington

Hookers:

Max Hayward, Dan Eddison, Sean Beynon

2nd rows:

Dai Beynon, Mark Boswell, Rhys Williams, Alex Wilkes, William Edwards

Back row:

Dan Manning, Sam Smith, Robin Badham, Rob Jones, Rob Weston, Jordan Gwilliam

Scrum Half:

Darren Gilbert, James Skeels

Fly Half:

James Davies, Phil Williams, Simon Hooper

Centers:

Mark Williams, Simon Cole, Dom Coleman, Barry Bowen, Huw Purser

Wings: Geraint Jackson, Joe Jackson, Luca Trimarco

Full backs:

John Williams, Daniel Williams, Sean Dalling

== The youth team ==
Pembroke has a youth team

== Sevens tournament ==
Pembroke holds an annual Youth sevens tournament in April, since 1999.

== Notable players ==
- (Wales) Mike Knill
- (Wales) Rob Appleyard
- (Wales) Jonathan Thomas
- (Wales) Dominic Day
- (Scotland) Luke Hamilton
- (Wales) Daffy “Sadie” Lewis
- (Wales) Seamus Wiseman
