= A476 road =

Road in Wales

A476

Major junctions
- Southwest end: Llanelli; 51.6844°N 4.1609°W
- A4214 A484; A48 A483
- Northeast end: Ffairfach; 51.8750°N 3.9938°W

Location
- Country: United Kingdom
- Constituent country: Wales
- Primary destinations: Llanelli

Road network
- Roads in the United Kingdom; Motorways; A and B road zones

The A476 is a main road in Wales, linking Llanelli with the A483, the Swansea to Manchester Trunk road near the market town of Llandeilo.

Settlements served by the road include:

- Llanelli
- Panteg
- Llannon
- Upper Tumble
- Cross Hands
- Gorslas
- Carmel
- Golden Grove
- Ffairfach (1/2 mile (0.80 km) south of Llandeilo)
