= Cross Hands =

Village in Carmarthenshire, Wales

Coordinates: 51.7952°N 4.0857°W

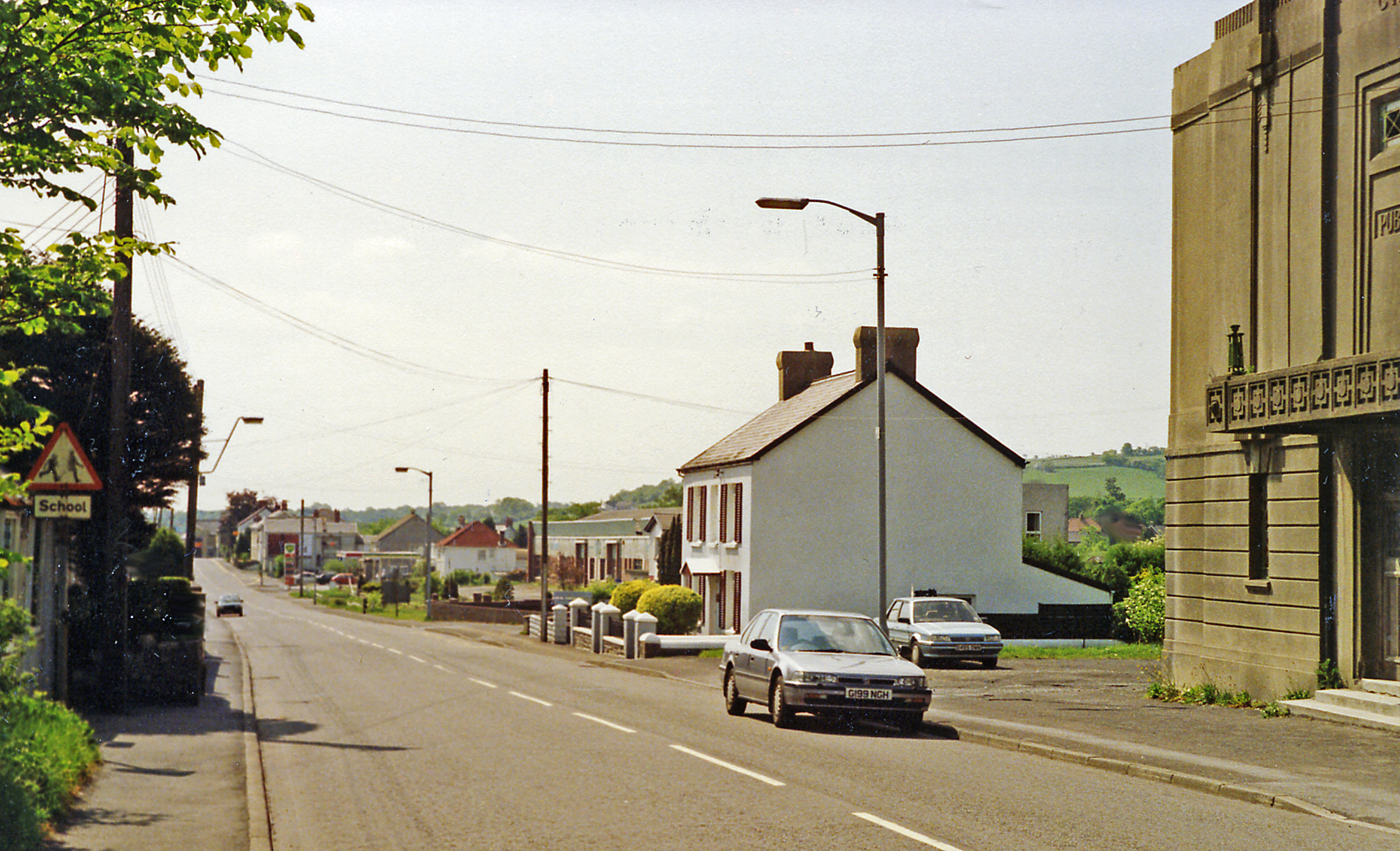
- site of the former railway station

- Location within Carmarthenshire
- OS grid reference: SN562127
- Community: Llannon
- Principal area: Carmarthenshire
- Preserved county: Dyfed
- Country: Wales
- Sovereign state: United Kingdom
- Post town: LLANELLI
- Postcode district: SA14
- Dialling code: 01269
- Police: Dyfed-Powys
- Fire: Mid and West Wales
- Ambulance: Welsh
- UK Parliament: Llanelli
- Senedd Cymru – Welsh Parliament: Llanelli

Cross Hands is a village in Carmarthenshire, Wales, approximately 12 miles (19 kilometres) from Carmarthen.

Cross Hands is notable for its Public Hall, erected in 1920 and designed by an unknown Italian designer in the classic Art Deco Style. Fully restored, the Public Hall has a fully functioning stage and cinema screen and is protected as a Grade II* listed building. During the 1960s and 1970s the village was a useful halfway stop for motorists from South East Wales driving to/from Pembrokeshire with the local chip shop adjacent to the village crossroads being a very popular facility.

The continuous built up area which includes the villages of Cross Hands, Gorslas, Cefneithin and Pen-y-groes had a population of 5,717 in 2011.

Cross Hands is a growing residential and employment area and includes the established Cross Hands Food Park to the south west of the A48. A new business park, the Cross Hands Business Park, is being developed to the northeast of the A48 which the local authority hopes will create 1,000 jobs.

Gweunydd Glan-y-glasnant, a Site of Special Scientific Interest notable for its species-rich neutral grassland, is 3/4 mile (1.2 kilometres) southwest of Cross Hands.

== Etymology ==
The village's name likely comes from the 'Cross Hands Inn' which was located on its cross roads (like many other villages at the time). An unlikely alternative theory comes from the idea that prisoners were transferred between Carmarthen and Swansea in the village.

== History ==
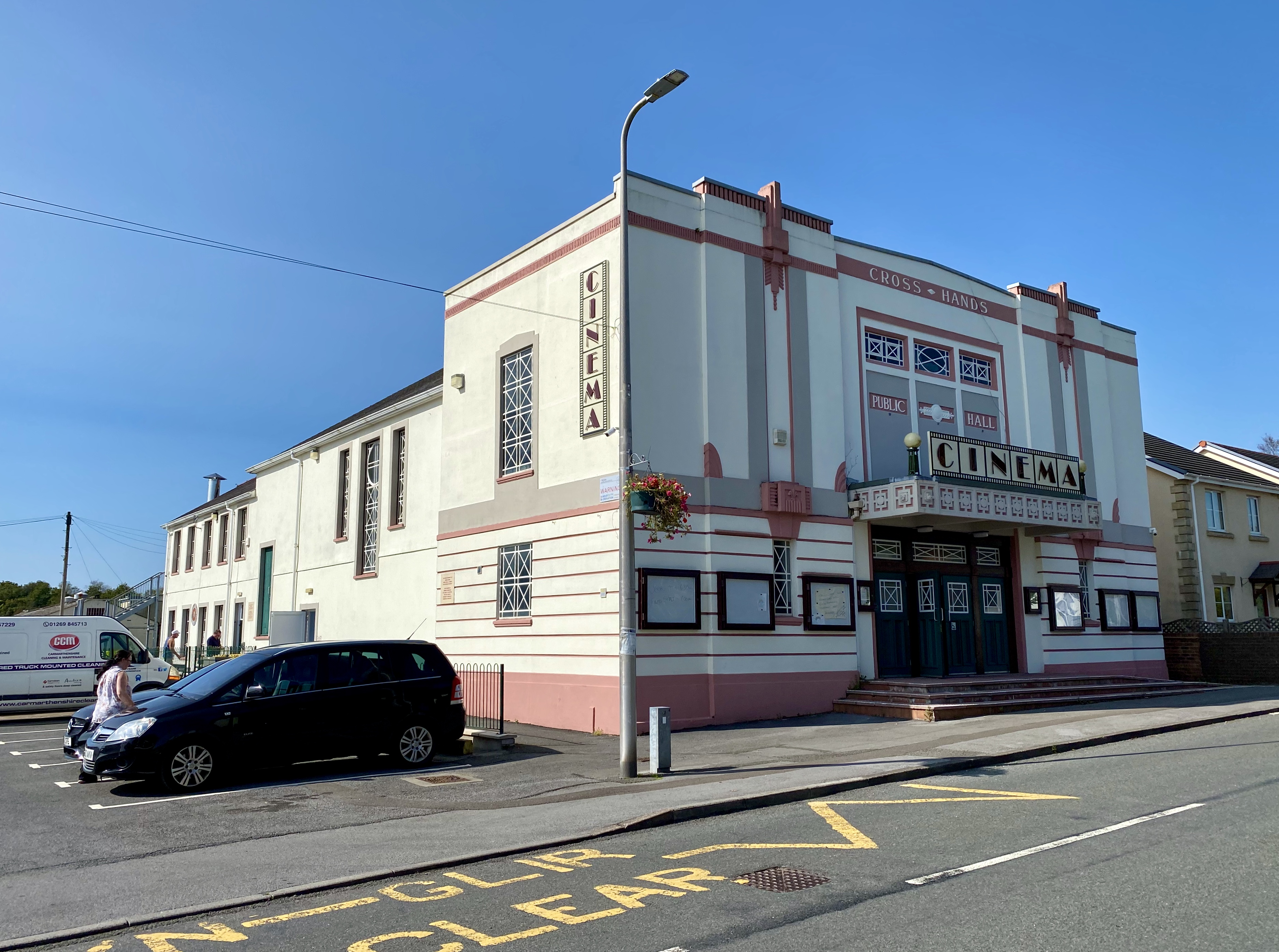
Cross Hands Public Hall and Cinema

The village played an important role in the local coal industry, helping to house the many anthracite miners working in the nearby mines such as in Tumble. Norton & Co opened the Cross Hands Colliery in 1869. There were 859 employees at its peak in 1923. By 1962 the village's collieries had closed.

Cross Hands is notable for its public hall and cinema. It was built in 1926 by an unknown Italian architect from Swansea. Its elegant art deco style architecture lead to it gaining a Grade II* listed building status in 1999. After some renovations in the early 1990s, the hall still stands as a fully operational cinema run by a charity. The rear is now used as a hall for the elderly.

== New link road ==
On 2 December 2012, Carmarthenshire County Council announced plans for a new road to enable traffic on the A476 to bypass the congested Cross Hands roundabout. At an estimated cost of £20 million, the route will start from Gorslas, northeast of the roundabout, and continue to the Cross Hands Food Park junction on the A48. It will reconnect with the existing A476 southwest of the Cross Hands roundabout.

== Notable people ==
- Eifion Evans (1931–2017), a Welsh pastor and church historian.
- Ken Jones (1941–2022), a Welsh international rugby union player.
