= Howard Davies (rugby union) =

Wales international rugby union player (1916–1987)

- Born: Christmas Howard Davies; 25 December 1916 Llanelli, Wales
- Died: 5 November 1987 (aged 70) Llanelli, Wales

Rugby union career
- Position: full-back
Amateur team(s)
Years	Team	Apps	(Points)
- Burry Port RFC
1937-?	Swansea RFC		
- Llanelli RFC
International career
Years	Team	Apps	(Points)
1939-1947	Wales	7	(0)

Christmas Howard Davies (25 December 1916 - 5 November 1987) was a Welsh international rugby union full-back who played club rugby for Llanelli and Swansea. He won six caps for Wales.

== Rugby career ==
Davies was one of very few Welsh players to represent his country on either side of the Second World War. When he was first selected to play for Wales, he was playing club rugby for Swansea, having started his rugby career with Burry Port. His first international game was against Scotland as part of the 1939 Home Nations Championship under the captaincy of Wilf Wooller. Wales beat Scotland 11–3, and Davies was reselected for the very next match at Ravenhill Stadium in Belfast against Ireland. Wales were victorious, but with the outbreak of World War II, this was the last match either team would play for eight years.

When international rugby was re-introduced, Davies, now playing for Llanelli, was one of only two capped players to be chosen for the first Welsh match in the 1947 Five Nations Championship against England; the other being captain Haydn Tanner. The England game would be the only Wales match that Davies appeared on the losing side, as the final three games of the tournament Wales and Davies were victorious.

=== International matches played ===
Wales

- England 1947
- France 1947
- Ireland 1939, 1947
- Scotland 1939, 1947

== Bibliography ==
- Godwin, Terry (1984). The International Rugby Championship 1883-1983. London: Willows Books. ISBN 0-00-218060-X.
- Griffiths, John (1987). The Phoenix Book of International Rugby Records. London: Phoenix House. ISBN 0-460-07003-7.
- Smith, David; Williams, Gareth (1980). Fields of Praise: The Official History of The Welsh Rugby Union. Cardiff: University of Wales Press. ISBN 0-7083-0766-3.
