= Tumble, Carmarthenshire =

Village in Carmarthenshire, Wales

Coordinates: 51.783191°N 4.110706°W

Tumble: Welsh: Y Tymbl
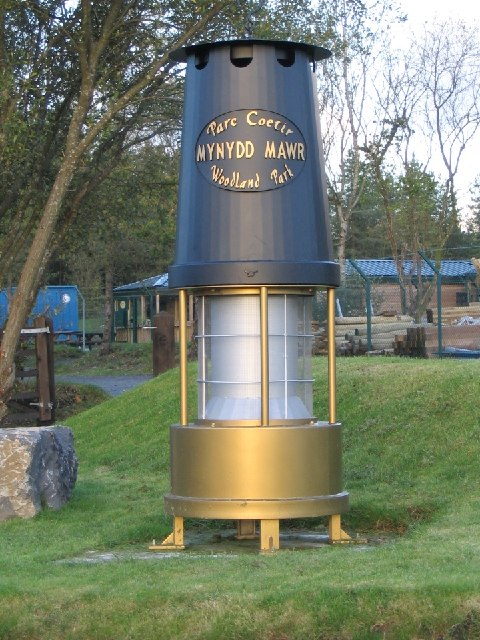
- A giant miner's lamp sculpture at the entrance to Mynydd Mawr Woodland Park in Tumble

- Location within Carmarthenshire
- Population: 4,302
- OS grid reference: SN545115
- Community: Llannon
- Principal area: Carmarthenshire
- Preserved county: Dyfed
- Country: Wales
- Sovereign state: United Kingdom
- Post town: LLANELLI
- Postcode district: SA14
- Dialling code: 01269
- Police: Dyfed-Powys
- Fire: Mid and West Wales
- Ambulance: Welsh
- UK Parliament: Llanelli
- Senedd Cymru – Welsh Parliament: Llanelli

Tumble (Welsh: Y Tymbl), is a village situated south of Cross Hands near the towns of Carmarthen and Llanelli in Carmarthenshire, Wales. Tumble, along with Cross Hands is part of the community of Llannon. The population, including Drefach was 4,302.

== History ==
The village's name comes from a local tavern, the Tumbledown Dick, which was named after the nickname for Oliver Cromwell's son, Richard.

Tumble developed in the 19th century to house the anthracite miners who were employed at the nearby Dynant Fach and Great Mountain collieries. Tumble was once served by Tumble Railway Station, a station built on the Llanelly and Mynydd Mawr Railway to allow the transportation of coal from the local mines to Llanelli Docks.

== Sports and leisure ==
Although a small village, Tumble is home to rugby union club Tumble RFC. Formed in 1897 the club are the record holders of the West Wales Challenge Cup having won the trophy on twelve separate occasions. The club has produced Welsh internationals Archie Skym, D. Ken Jones. Gareth Davies, Richard Rees and Dwayne Peel. Jones, Davies and Peel all went on to represent the British and Irish Lions.

One of the most famous residents of the village was snooker player Gary Owen, who was world amateur champion in 1963 and 1966.

Gweunydd Glan-y-glasnant, a Site of Special Scientific Interest notable for its species-rich neutral grassland, is 0.6 miles (0.97 km) east of Tumble.

== Bibliography ==
- Davies, John; Jenkins, Nigel (2008). The Welsh Academy Encyclopaedia of Wales. Cardiff: University of Wales Press. p. 503. ISBN 978-0-7083-1953-6.
