= Trimsaran =

Community and former village in Carmarthenshire, Wales

- Location within Carmarthenshire
- Population: 2,541 (of which 2461 speak Welsh)
- Community: Trimsaran
- Principal area: Carmarthenshire
- Preserved county: Dyfed
- Country: Wales
- Sovereign state: United Kingdom
- Post town: KIDWELLY
- Postcode district: SA17
- Dialling code: 01554
- Police: Dyfed-Powys
- Fire: Mid and West Wales
- Ambulance: Welsh
- UK Parliament: Llanelli
- Senedd Cymru – Welsh Parliament: Llanelli
- List of places UK Wales Carmarthenshire 51.7178°N 4.2379°W Map of the community

Trimsaran is a community and former mining village which lies on the B4308 between Llanelli and Kidwelly, in Carmarthenshire, Wales.

Trimsaran is six miles (10 km) from Llanelli, and 13 miles (21 km) from Carmarthen. It is close to Burry Port harbour, Pembrey Country Park and the Millennium Coastal Park.

The community is bordered by the communities of: Llangyndeyrn; Llanelli Rural; Pembrey and Burry Port Town; and Kidwelly, all being in Carmarthenshire.

Between 1909 and 1953 Trimsaran Road railway station on what had been the Burry Port and Gwendraeth Valley Railway, served the miners and the residents of the village and locality.

== Trimsaran Colliery ==
There are historical reports of mining activities taking place in the Trimsaran area dating back hundreds of years. By 1896, the Inspector of Mines noted that Trimsaran employed 144 men, producing coal, anthracite, and fireclay.

By the early 1900s, three drift mines made up Trimsaran colliery: Caedean (deepest), Waunhir and the Upper slant; all connected underground and on the surface by a tramway. By 1908, Waunhir and Cadean employed 198 men, while by 1918 the workforce had grown to 435. By 1923 352 men employed at Caedean Slant, Upper Slant employed 63 men and Waunhir 126 men.

There were three notable mining accidents:

- February 1907, Waunhir slant - 6 men died when a coupling plate broke and full mine-cars ran down the drift - the men had no chance.
- 1909 - an explosion in the Caedean Slant killed 4 men, possibly caused by firedamp.
- 26 April 1923- 12 men died whilst travelling out of the mine the end of the day shift, when part of the journey of drams, in which they were riding suddenly careered back down the slope after a connecting shackle broke.

By 1931 the mine was owned by Amalgamated Anthracite Ltd. and employed 700 men on the existing working. These drifts closed in 1934 and was replaced by the Waunffynhonnau drift (new drift or Wimpey drift), which employed over 300 men in 1945. The mine was closed by the National Coal Board in April 1954, with most of the workforce going to Carway or Pentremawr Colliery.

The site was later opened up as part of Celtic Energy's move into opencast mining, called Ffos Las, but was closed in 1997.

As part of the redevelopment of the site, it has been approved to become a coarse fishing lake, quad bike and mountain biking centre, before proposed redevelopment of the site as a £16 million/1000m horse racing course, training centre and a grandstand for 1,000 spectators. A hotel and up to 250 houses would also be built on the site of the 608-acre (2.46 km^{2}) site.

== Notable people ==
- Owen Picton Davies (1882–1970), a Welsh journalist.
- Jonathan Davies OBE (born 1962), former rugby footballer who represented Wales in both rugby union and rugby league.
- Nigel Davies (born 1965), a former international rugby union player, who played his club rugby at Llanelli RFC.
- Garan Evans (born 1973), former rugby union footballer, who played for Llanelli & Wales.
- Trystan Gravelle (born 1981), theatre, film and television actor.

== Trimsaran Rugby Club ==
Trimsaran is known for its rugby union involvement, and is a sport that plays a part in the local community. Rugby was first played in Trimsaran in 1910 but the first recorded captain was Bill Bailey in 1927. Players who have graduated from Trimsaran RFC onto represent Wales included Jonathan Davies, Garan Evans, Aaron "Girthy" Bowen and Gareth Lewis, who made his debut against Australia in the 2016 Autumn internationals.
