= Trimsaran RFC =

Welsh rugby team

(Wales) Trimsaran United RFC
- Full name: Trimsaran United Rugby Football Club
- Nickname(s): Lone Wolves
- Founded: 1927(c)
- Location: Trimsaran, Wales
- Ground(s): Cae Ffair
- President: Howell Richards
- Coach(es): Rbert Nelson/Julian Lloyd
- League(s): WRU Division Four West
- 2009-10: 9th
Team kit

Official website
- trimsaranrfc.8m.com/homepage.htm

Trimsaran United Rugby Football Club is a rugby union team from the village of Trimsaran in South Wales. The club is a member of the Welsh Rugby Union and is a feeder club for the Llanelli Scarlets.

== Club badge ==
The club badge is a shield split into quarters with the club name in scrolls around it. Two of the quarters show the team's colours of emerald green and black in stripes. The third quarter features the entry bridge to Trismaran, Pont Spwdwr, thought to be the oldest Norman bridge in Wales. The final segment holds the Prince of Wales's feathers.

== Notable former players ==
- (Wales) Jonathan Davies
- (Wales) Nigel Davies (29 caps)
- (Wales) Les Williams (7 caps)
