= History of rugby union matches between Italy and Wales =

Italy and Wales have played each other at rugby union since 1994. A total of 35 matches have been played, with Wales winning 29, Italy winning five and one drawn match.

== Summary ==
=== Overview ===
Details	Played	Won by Italy	Won by Wales	Drawn	Italy points	Wales points
In Italy	15	3	12	0	255	486
In Wales	19	2	16	1	293	644
Neutral venue	1	0	1	0	15	27
Overall	35	5	29	1	563	1,157

=== Records ===
Note: Date shown in brackets indicates when the record was or last set.

Record	Italy	Wales
Longest winning streak	2 (16 March 2024 – 8 February 2025)	16 (23 February 2008 – 13 March 2021)
Largest points for
Home	30 (15 February 2003)	67 (19 March 2016)
Away	26 (16 January 1996)	61 (21 March 2015)
Largest winning margin
Home	8 (15 February 2003)	53 (19 March 2016)
Away	3 (15 March 2024)	41 (21 March 2015)

== Results ==
No.	Date	Venue	Score	Winner	Competition	Ref.
1	12 October 1994	National Stadium, Cardiff	29–19	Wales	1995 Rugby World Cup qualification	
2	16 January 1996	National Stadium, Cardiff	31–26	Wales	1996 Italy tour of Wales	
3	5 October 1996	Stadio Olimpico, Rome	22–31	Wales	1996 Wales tour of Italy	
4	7 February 1998	Stradey Park, Llanelli	23–20	Wales	1998 Italy tour of Wales	
5	20 March 1999	Stadio Comunale di Monigo, Treviso	21–60	Wales	1999 Wales tour of Italy	
6	19 February 2000	Millennium Stadium, Cardiff	47–16	Wales	2000 Six Nations Championship	
7	8 April 2001	Stadio Flaminio, Rome	23–33	Wales	2001 Six Nations Championship	
8	2 March 2002	Millennium Stadium, Cardiff	44–20	Wales	2002 Six Nations Championship	
9	15 February 2003	Stadio Flaminio, Rome	30–22	Italy	2003 Six Nations Championship	
10	25 October 2003	Canberra Stadium, Canberra (Australia)	15–27	Wales	2003 Rugby World Cup	
11	27 March 2004	Millennium Stadium, Cardiff	44–10	Wales	2004 Six Nations Championship	
12	12 February 2005	Stadio Flaminio, Rome	8–38	Wales	2005 Six Nations Championship	
13	11 March 2006	Millennium Stadium, Cardiff	18–18	draw	2006 Six Nations Championship	
14	10 March 2007	Stadio Flaminio, Rome	23–20	Italy	2007 Six Nations Championship	
15	23 February 2008	Millennium Stadium, Cardiff	47–8	Wales	2008 Six Nations Championship	
16	14 March 2009	Stadio Flaminio, Rome	15–20	Wales	2009 Six Nations Championship	
17	20 March 2010	Millennium Stadium, Cardiff	33–10	Wales	2010 Six Nations Championship	
18	26 February 2011	Stadio Flaminio, Rome	16–24	Wales	2011 Six Nations Championship	
19	10 March 2012	Millennium Stadium, Cardiff	24–3	Wales	2012 Six Nations Championship	
20	23 February 2013	Stadio Olimpico, Rome	9–26	Wales	2013 Six Nations Championship	
21	1 February 2014	Millennium Stadium, Cardiff	23–15	Wales	2014 Six Nations Championship	
22	21 March 2015	Stadio Olimpico, Rome	20–61	Wales	2015 Six Nations Championship	
23	5 September 2015	Millennium Stadium, Cardiff	23–19	Wales	2015 Rugby World Cup warm-up match	
24	19 March 2016	Principality Stadium, Cardiff	67–14	Wales	2016 Six Nations Championship	
25	5 February 2017	Stadio Olimpico, Rome	7–33	Wales	2017 Six Nations Championship	
26	11 March 2018	Principality Stadium, Cardiff	38–14	Wales	2018 Six Nations Championship	
27	9 February 2019	Stadio Olimpico, Rome	15–26	Wales	2019 Six Nations Championship	
28	1 February 2020	Principality Stadium, Cardiff	42–0	Wales	2020 Six Nations Championship	
29	5 December 2020	Parc y Scarlets, Llanelli	38–18	Wales	Autumn Nations Cup	
30	13 March 2021	Stadio Olimpico, Rome	7–48	Wales	2021 Six Nations Championship	
31	19 March 2022	Principality Stadium, Cardiff	21–22	Italy	2022 Six Nations Championship	
32	11 March 2023	Stadio Olimpico, Rome	17–29	Wales	2023 Six Nations Championship	
33	16 March 2024	Principality Stadium, Cardiff	21–24	Italy	2024 Six Nations Championship	
34	8 February 2025	Stadio Olimpico, Rome	22–15	Italy	2025 Six Nations Championship	
35	14 March 2026	Principality Stadium, Cardiff	31–17	Wales	2026 Six Nations Championship	
