= Queen Elizabeth High School, Carmarthen =

Coordinates: 51.846245°N 4.321146°W

Ysgol Frenhines Elisabeth
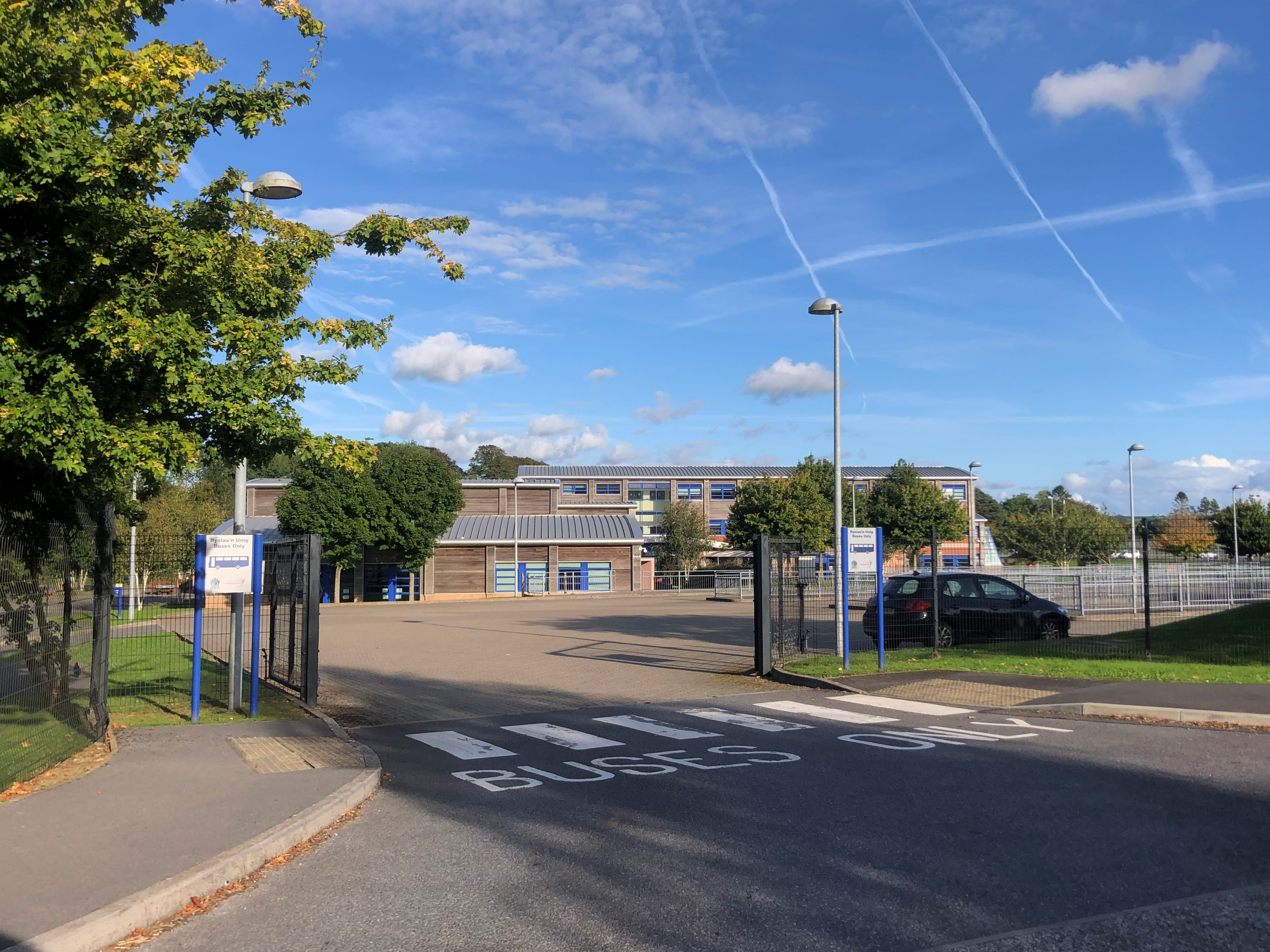

Location
- Llansteffan Road Johnstown; Carmarthen, Carmarthenshire, SA31 3NL; Wales

Information
- Type: Comprehensive
- Motto: 'Moving Forward Together' (Ymlaen Gyda'n Gilydd)
- Established: September 2005
- Local authority: Carmarthenshire County Council
- Chair: Jeremy Griffith
- Head teacher: Lisa Jones
- Head of learning: Nicole Thomas
- Gender: Mixed
- Age: 11 to 18
- Enrolment: 1403
- Houses: 6: Cothi, Gwili, Steffan, Towy, Dewi & Elfed
- Colours: Red, Blue (Lower School); Red, Black (Sixth Form)
- Website: http://www.qehs.carms.sch.uk

Queen Elizabeth High School is a comprehensive school for Carmarthen and its surrounding areas.

== History ==
=== Queen Elizabeth Grammar School ===
The origins of Queen Elizabeth High School began in 1576 with the establishment of the Queen Elizabeth Grammar School on Priory Street in Carmarthen. It was a selective boys' secondary school set up for the benefit of the merchant people of the town.

==== Thomas Powell's School ====
Sir Thomas Powell's Charity School was endowed in 1729 to teach 6 poor boys. It was located in a small schoolroom below The Parade in Carmarthen. A new school building was built on Esplanade in 1846-1847 to house 15 free places and 34 paying scholars.

==== The Endowed Schools ====
In 1857, Thomas Powell's School merged with the Grammar School, becoming the Endowed Schools. The school relocated to Richmond Terrace in 1884.

In 1894, six school districts were formed, including Carmarthen. The Queen Elizabeth Grammar School was incorporated as a boys' school, and a school for girls was also established in 1895.

Former pupils of the boys' grammar school include the educationalist Griffith Jones; the early Methodist leader and Bible publisher Peter Williams; the senior Admiralty civil servant Sir Walter St David Jenkins; the clergyman James Rice Buckley; the Welsh poet William Saunders; the Welsh international rugby players, Roy Bergiers, Gerald Davies and Ray Gravell; the tennis commentator and journalist Gerald Williams; the journalist and author Byron Rogers; politicians Denzil Davies and Mark Drakeford.

=== Ysgol Bro Myrddin ===
In 1978, the Grammar School closed, and the school Ysgol Bro Myrddin was opened on the site. In 1996, Ysgol Bro Myrddin relocated to a different site in Croesyceiliog on the outskirts of town. The site on Richmond Terrace is still used as an office base for Carmarthenshire Council.

=== Queen Elizabeth High School ===
Queen Elizabeth High School was formed in September 2005 by the joining together of Queen Elizabeth Maridunum School and Queen Elizabeth Cambria School, which were located within 300m of each other.

In September 2008, Daniyal Shahzad, a Pakistani national falsely claiming his name was Ahmer Rana, became a pupil at the school. Lodging with foster parents, on investigation in 2010 by the UK Border Agency, he claimed that he had no family. He was subject to a deportation order, and the school became the centre of a campaign to allow him to stay in the UK, which resulted in a 4,000 signature petition being collected and presented to Gordon Brown. After further investigation by S4C's current affairs programme 'Y Byd ar Bedwar' his true identity was revealed. Shahzad was deported to Pakistan on 1 June 2011.

== Notable former pupils ==
- Emrys G. Bowen – professor of Geography, Aberystwyth
- Charles Lynn Davies – Welsh international rugby player
- Denzil Davies – MP for Llanelli
- Mark Drakeford – leader of the Welsh Labour Party and First Minister of Wales
- Richard Edwards – member of the National Assembly for Wales for Preseli, Pembrokeshire
- Ieuan Evans – Welsh international rugby player
- Rhod Gilbert – comedian
- Frederick Farey-Jones – MP for Watford
- Thomas Jones-Davies – heart specialist and Welsh international rugby player
- Percy Lloyd – Welsh international rugby player
- William Norton – Welsh international rugby player
- Terence Thomas, Baron Thomas of Macclesfield – banker and politician
- Sir David Williams – barrister and past vice-chancellor of University of Cambridge
- Baroness Worthington of Cambridge – British environmental campaigner and life peer in the House of Lords
