= Charles Lynn Davies =

Wales international rugby union player (born 1929)

Lynn Davies
- Born: Charles Lynn Davies; 30 December 1929 (age 96) Bancyfelin, Wales
- School: Queen Elizabeth Grammar School, Carmarthen
- University: Trinity College, Carmarthen; City of Cardiff College of Physical Education

Rugby union career
- Position: wing
Amateur team(s)
Years	Team	Apps	(Points)
- Carmarthen Athletic RFC
–	Glamorgan Wanderers RFC		
–	Llanelli RFC		
–	Cardiff RFC		
International career
Years	Team	Apps	(Points)
1956	Wales	3	(6)

Charles Lynn 'Cowboy' Davies (born 30 December 1929) is a former Wales international rugby union wing who played club rugby for several clubs, including Llanelli and Cardiff. He won three caps for Wales. He also represented the Welsh Amateur Athletic Association in 1957.

== Rugby career ==
Davies played rugby from a young age and represented the Wales Schools team. As an adult, Davies played for several rugby clubs before playing for first-class teams, Llanelli and Cardiff, but it was while he was with Cardiff that he was selected to represent Wales. All his international appearances were part of the 1956 Five Nations Championship, and his first match was against England under the captaincy of Cliff Morgan. Wales won the game 8-3, and Davies scored a try on his debut after a forty-yard dash. Davies was reselected for the very next match against Scotland, in which Davies again succeeded in scoring a try. His final game was against Ireland, who spoiled Welsh attempts at winning the Triple Crown by beating Wales 11-3 at Lansdowne Road.

=== International matches played ===
Wales

- England 1956
- Ireland 1956
- Scotland 1956

== Bibliography ==
- Godwin, Terry (1984). The International Rugby Championship 1883-1983. London: Willows Books. ISBN 0-00-218060-X.
- Griffiths, John (1987). The Phoenix Book of International Rugby Records. London: Phoenix House. ISBN 0-460-07003-7.
- Smith, David; Williams, Gareth (1980). Fields of Praise: The Official History of The Welsh Rugby Union. Cardiff: University of Wales Press. ISBN 0-7083-0766-3.
