= Tommy Evans (rugby union) =

- Full name: Thomas David Evans
- Born: 8 May 1902 Neyland, Wales
- Died: 6 August 1969 (aged 67) Carmarthen, Wales

Rugby union career
- Position: Centre
International career
Years	Team	Apps	(Points)
1924	Wales	1	(0)

Thomas David Evans (8 May 1902 – 6 August 1969) was a Welsh international rugby union player.

Evans hailed from Neyland in Pembrokeshire.

A centre, Evans was capped once for Wales, appearing next to Swansea teammate Rowe Harding against Ireland at Cardiff in the 1924 Five Nations. He also featured against the 1924–25 All Blacks in a match with Swansea.

== See also ==
- List of Wales national rugby union players
