= Delme Thomas =

British Lions & Wales international rugby union footballer

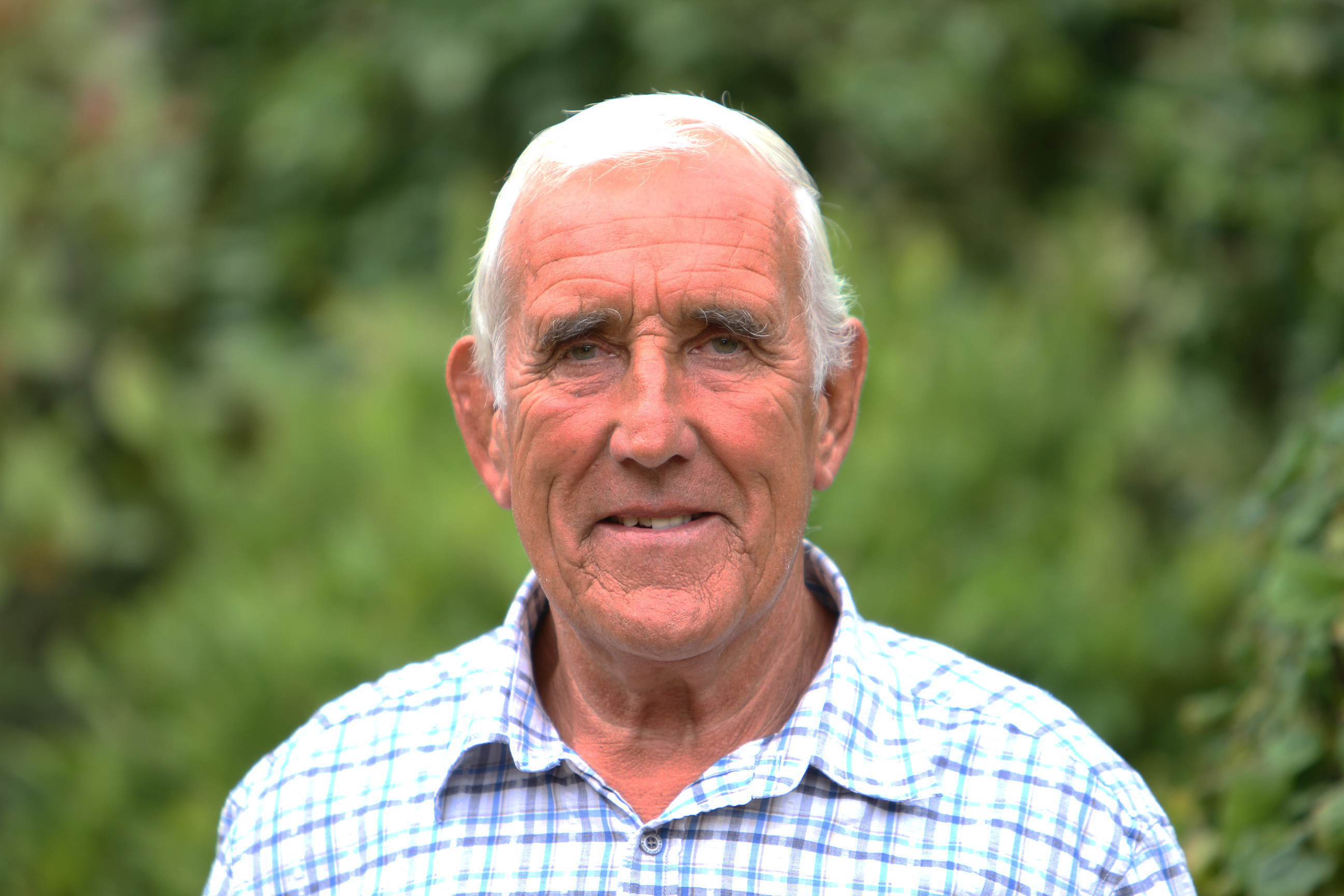
- Born: William Delme Thomas; 12 September 1942 (age 84) Bancyfelin, Carmarthenshire, Wales
- Height: 191 cm (6 ft 3 in)
- Weight: 104 kg (229 lb)

Rugby union career
- Position: Second Row
Senior career
Years	Team	Apps	(Points)
- Llanelli RFC
International career
Years	Team	Apps	(Points)
1966–74	Wales	25	(0)
1966–71	British Lions	7	(0)
- Correct as of 29 April 2019

William Delme Thomas (born 12 September 1942) is a former rugby union player who became one of Wales' best known rugby players in the 1960s and 1970s. He joined Llanelli RFC in 1961 and was the team's captain when they won the league in the 1972–73 season and was also the captain when Llanelli beat a touring All Blacks team in 1972. He is remembered for his emotional speech given to his teammates before this game. He played lock forward.

== Early life and work ==
Thomas was born in Bancyfelin, near Carmarthen. He worked as an electricity board linesman, climbing telegraph poles to make repairs.

== Rugby career ==
=== Llanelli ===
Thomas played for Llanelli rugby club. He led them in their famous victory over the All Blacks at Stradey Park in 1972. His famous speech to his players before the game included his statement that he would willingly trade everything he had achieved with Wales and the Lions for victory that day "on our own ground in front of our own people".

=== Wales ===
He played for the Wales national youth team at age eighteen and won his first cap against Australia in December 1966 and was first choice as lock for the team until he retired from international rugby in 1974, playing his last International in his only loss against England. He was an important part of the team that won the Grand Slam in 1971. During his penultimate season, he was Wales' captain in the game against New Zealand in Cardiff. In total, he won 25 caps.

=== British and Irish Lions ===
Delme Thomas toured three times with the then-British Lions. He got his first cap in 1966, before playing for the Wales team, where he played in two test matches. He went on to play two games in the 1968 tour in South Africa and another two in New Zealand in 1971.

== After rugby ==
After retiring from playing rugby in 1974, Thomas experienced mental troubles, which he ascribed in part to leaving the rugby 'family' particularly at Llanelli.

== Recognition ==
In 2000, at the National Eisteddfod in Llanelli, Thomas was honoured as a member of the Gorsedd of the Bards, for his contribution to Welsh sport and the Welsh language.
