= Tenby United RFC =

Welsh rugby union club, based in Tenby

Wales
- Full name: Tenby United Rugby Football Club
- Union: Welsh Rugby Union
- Nickname: Seasiders
- Founded: 1901
- Ground: Heywood Lane
- Chairman: Harry Bolton
- Director of Rugby: Jonathan Evans
- Coach(es): Andrew Barlow, Ossie Boswell and Aled Waters
- Captain: Tom Barrass
- League: WRU Division One West
- 2024-2025: Runner-up
Team kit

Official website
- www.tenbyunitedrfc.com

Tenby United Rugby Football Club is a rugby union team from the town of Tenby in West Wales. It is nicknamed The Seasiders.

== Early history ==
The first mention of a rugby team in Tenby came in an ad published on 7 January 1869 in "The Tenby Observer". The ad stated that the "Tenby Football Club Will meet on Wednesdays and Saturdays, at 2.45 p.m. precisely, in the FIELD next to the SERPENTINE ROAD." Rugby union was also played in Tenby around 1876 when several clubs were recorded as playing in the town. On 01/03/1887, it was announced that Tenby FC would be wound up. However, a Tenby FC team was playing the following season, and a match report in November 1887 stated that the Tenby FC team had "been in existence for the last five years or so". Another ad appears in the "Tenby Observer" in December 1887 by the hon. sec. of Tenby FC stating that other local rugby teams in Tenby had also been using the title "TENBY FC" despite being unauthorised by the TENBY FC. In 1898 one of these teams, the Tenby Swifts gained membership to the Welsh Football Union, which showed the commitment to the game in the area. In 1901 the Tenby Swifts formed with the Tenby Harlequins to create Tenby United RFC.

== Modern game ==
The club is an affiliated member of the Welsh Rugby Union and is a feeder club for the Llanelli Scarlets Region. The Seasiders recently gained a double trophy haul, gaining promotion from Division 3 West to Division One West after successfully winning a promotion play off game against Division 3 East side Wattstown at the business end of the 2013–2014 season. The play off was held at Dunvant RFC and Tenby Utd ran out comfortable winners and felt that they had earned their promotion the hard way by coming runner up in the league campaign and having to go the extra mile by way of the one chance play off. The United also won the county cup (Pembrokeshire & District Knock Out Cup). Tenby Utd RFC has won the Pembrokeshire Cup more than any other team.

Tenby Utd RFC and runs a Mini and Junior section within the club and the club field teams each week all the way from the U7s right up to the 1stXV.

Club Honours League:

Pembrokeshire League Winners (1906 to 1989) – 20 times

2013/14 – SSE Swalec League 3 West (Runners-Up)

2013/14 – Promotion Play-Off Winners (Promotion to Division 1 West)

2010/11 – Division 4 Champions (Promotion to Division 3)

Cup:

Pembrokeshire County Cup Winners – 33 times
