= Hendy RFC =

Welsh rugby union club, based in Carmarthenshire, Wales

(Wales) Hendy RFC
- Full name: Hendy Rugby Football Club
- Founded: 1893
- Location: Hendy, Wales
- Ground: Hendy Park
- Chairman: John Davies
- Coach: Ian Ted James
- League: WRU Division one West
- 2009-10: 8th
Team kit

Official website
- www.pitchero.com/clubs/hendy/

Hendy Rugby Football Club is a rugby union team from the village of Hendy in West Wales. The club is a member of the Welsh Rugby Union and is a feeder club for the Llanelli Scarlets.

== Notable former players ==
- (Wales) David Idwell Davies (1 cap)
- (Luxembourg) (Munster) Ruadhri Guilfoyle (31 cap)
- (Wales) Dai Hiddlestone (5 caps)
- (Wales) Bryn Howells (1 cap)
