= Gorslas =

Village and community in Carmarthenshire, Wales

Coordinates: 51°48′N 4°04′W

- Village and community
- Location within Carmarthenshire
- Principal area: Carmarthenshire
- Country: Wales
- Sovereign state: United Kingdom
- Police: Dyfed-Powys
- Fire: Mid and West Wales
- Ambulance: Welsh
- List of places UK Wales Carmarthenshire Map of the community

Gorslas is a village and community in Carmarthenshire, Wales, located on the A476 road northwest of Cross Hands. The village population at the 2011 census was 4,066. Neighbouring villages are Cefneithin and Penygroes. The community is bordered by the Carmarthenshire communities of Llanarthney, Llanfihangel Aberbythych, Llandybie, Llannon, Pontyberem, and Llanddarog. The community includes the settlements of Drefach, Cwmmawr, Foelgastell, and Cefneithin. Gorslas will have a new primary school, opening on 7 September 2022, a year later than planned following the coronavirus pandemic. The school will be a community based centre with local groups able to make use of its facilities.

== Governance ==
An electoral ward in the same name exists. This ward has the same area and population as the community.

== See also ==
- Foelgastell
