= Pembroke Dock Harlequins RFC =

(Wales) Pembroke Dock Harlequins RFC
- Union: Welsh Rugby Union
- Founded: 1880
- Location: Pembroke Dock, Wales
- Ground: Bierspool Ground
- Coach: Jeff Newman/Phil Hughes
- Captain: Barry Parsons
- League: WRU Division Five West
- 2013-14: 10th
1st kit	2nd kit

Pembroke Dock Harlequins Rugby Football Club is a Welsh rugby union team based in Pembroke Dock. The club is a member of the Welsh Rugby Union (WRU) and is a feeder club for the Llanelli Scarlets. They are known locally as simply the 'Quins'. The team was founded in 1880, a year before the creation of the WRU and the formation of the Wales national team.

The club joined the Welsh Rugby Union in 1896, making the club one of the earliest teams from the region to gain membership. The clubs records from 1923 to 1999 are presently held by the historical society, Archive Wales.

== Homeground ==
Pembroke Dock play all their home games at the Bierspool Ground located on London Road where they have been located since 1956. There is a stand with seating on the east side of the pitch built onto the side of the clubhouse, changing rooms and function hall. There is also a training pitch located behind the changing rooms. Prior to this they played their home games at the Barrack Hill ground.

Pembroke Dock traditionally play in Black and White colours. The current strip is black and white horizontal bands. The team wear black shorts and black socks. The away strip (and 'seconds' strip) is the same as the home but with red bands in place of the black.

== League ==
Pembroke Dock were promoted from Division Four West at the end of the 2003/04 season after finishing as runners-up in the division. They produced some very good results in the 2004/05 season in order to finish fifth of fourteen in the league and stay in Division 3 West for the 2005/06 season. The 2006/07 season saw the Quins finish ninth, but a poor season in 2007/08 resulted in the club finish eleventh out of twelve teams. The club has managed to remain in Division Four West since, finishing in tenth position in the 2009/10 season.

== Notable players ==
Although no players have won an international cap directly from the club, the Harlequins have produced notable rugby talents that have gone on to represent their country. The most notable was W. J. A. Davies, who was educated at the Naval school in Pembroke Dock, and would eventually go on to captain.England. One of the most notable Wales players to play for Pembroke Dock was Ernie Finch. Finch, who was born and educated in the town, played for the Quins in his early years before progressing to first-class team Llanelli. He is best remembered for scoring a try for Llanelli against the 'Invincible' 1924 touring New Zealand team.

Pembroke Dock Harlequins now operate a Senior XV and Development XV and competition is encouraged. Both teams train together on a Tuesday & Thursday at 7 o'clock.

Current Senior Squad 2013/2014

Props

Chad Monk Dai Moseley Brendan O'Driscoll Jack Davies

Hookers

Carl Williams Jacob Newman

Second Row

Mike Davis Neil Harries Phil Kay

Back Row

Barry Parsons (Captain) Joe Powell Alex Pearce Nathan George Hywel Baker

Scrum Half

Dai Rees

Fly Half

Adam Cawley

Centre

Rhys Marchant Chad Mayer Adrian John

Wing

Ryan Nielson Sam Richards Harley watts Chris Harries

Fullback

Paul Jonker luke Barrett

Coaching/management Staff

Head Coach Jeff Newman

Assistant coach Phil Hughes

Management committee

Gavin Lloyd, Tony Manning, Keith Harris
