= St. Davids RFC =

- Full name: St. Davids Rugby Football Club
- Nickname(s): Saints
- Founded: 1953
- Location: St David's, Wales
- Chairman: Alex Perkins
- Coach(es): Morgan Griffiths
- Captain(s): Nathan Foster
- League(s): WRU Division 3 West A (2017)
Team kit

Official website
- www.stdavidsrugby.com

St. Davids Rugby Football Club is a rugby union team from the city of St. Davids in Wales. The club is a member of the Welsh Rugby Union and is a feeder club for the Llanelli Scarlets.

The club was formed in 1953 and set its first trials for membership at St David's Grammar School. Although a poor opening season saw the first team fail to win a single game, the club continued, and by the 1955/56 season they had purchased their own playing ground. In the 1963/64 season the club had built a clubhouse and in 1977 the team joined the Pembrokeshire League. During the club's 25th anniversary they hosted first class team Pontypridd and for their 40th anniversary faced the 'Welsh All Blacks', Neath.

Like many rugby clubs, St. Davids has undertaken several rugby tours, including trips to Ireland, England and France.

The team has seen several players selected for Welsh schoolboy rugby. Their most notable ex-player is Rowland Phillips, who not only played for first class team Neath, but also played for the Wales national team. Phillips won ten caps for his country; his first was against the United States in 1987.

== Notable former players ==
- (Wales) Rowland Phillips (10 caps)

Jasmine Joyce
