= Burry Port RFC =

Rugby union team in Burry Port, Carmarthenshire

- Burry Port RFC logo
- Full name: Burry Port Rugby Football Club
- Nickname(s): The Blacks
- Founded: 1880
- Location: Burry Port, Wales
- Ground(s): The Memorial Park
- Coach(es): Gareth Gravell
- League(s): WRU Division 1 West
- 2023/24: 3rd WRU Division two West
Team kit

Burry Port Rugby Football Club is a rugby union team from the village of Burry Port in West Wales. The club is a member of the Welsh Rugby Union and is a feeder club for the Llanelli Scarlets.

== Club honours ==
- WRU Division Five West 2007/08 - Champions
- WRU Division Six West winners 2013/14
- WRU Division Three West B Winners 2017/18
- WRU Division 2 West Winners 2019/20 no promotion due to covid
- WRU Division 2 West Winners 2021/22. No promotion due to covid
- 3rd Place WRU Division 2 West 2022/23 & Promoted to WRU 1 West

2015/16 SSE Swalec bowl Champions

== Notable former players ==
- (Wales) Howard Davies (6 caps)
- (Wales) Kirby Myhill (1 cap)
- Gareth Gravell ( Wales 7s Cap & Commonwealth Games 2002)
