= Cefneithin RFC =

Welsh rugby union club, based in Cefneithin, Carmarthenshire

(Wales) Cefneithin Rugby Football Club
- Full name: Cefneithin Rugby Football Club
- Nickname: Yr ‘eithin
- Founded: 1929; 97 years ago
- Location: Cefneithin, Carmarthenshire, Wales
- Ground: Cae Carwyn James
- President: Kevin Evans
- Coach: Gary Mills
- League: WRU Division 3b West
- 2021-22: 6th

Official website
- www.cefneithinrfc.co.uk

Cefnethin Rugby Football Club (Welsh: Clwb Rygbi Cefneithin) is a Welsh rugby union team from Cefneithin, Ammanford, Carmarthenshire . Officially founded in 1929. Cefnethin RFC is a member of the Welsh Rugby Union and is a feeder club for the Llanelli Scarlets. The club fields a first, seconds and youth team.

== Club honours ==
- 2008/09 WRU Division Five West - Champions
- 2018/19 WRU 3b West Central - Champions

== Notable former players ==
- (Wales) Carwyn James (2 caps)
- (Wales) Barry John
- (Wales) William John Jones (1 cap)
