= Llandybie RFC =

Welsh rugby team

(Wales) Llandybie RFC
- Full name: Llandybie Rugby Football Club
- Nickname: Tybie
- Founded: 1901
- Location: Llandybie, Wales
- Ground: King George V Playing Field
- Chairman: Handel Thomas
- President: Hywel Richards
- Coach: Jason Rosser
- League: SWALEC National League Division Three West B
- 23-24: 11th

Official website
- www.llandybierfc.co.uk

Llandybie RFC is a Welsh rugby union team based in the village of Llandybie, which is located 2.5 miles north of Ammanford in the county of Carmarthenshire. Llandybie RFC is a member of the Welsh Rugby Union and is a feeder club for the Llanelli-based professional team Scarlets. Llandybie RFC play in Division Three West B of the SWALEC National League.
