= 2006–07 WRU Challenge Cup =

The 2006–07 WRU Challenge Cup, known for sponsorship reasons as the Konica Minolta Cup, was the 37th WRU Challenge Cup, the annual national rugby union cup competition of Wales. Llandovery won the title for the very first time after beating Cardiff Rugby 20 - 18 in the final.

== Round 1 ==
Saturday 9 September, 2:30pm
Aberaeron	11 - 23	Dolgellau
Aberavon Quins	77 - 0	Old Penarthians
Aberdare	33 - 9	South Wales Police RFC
Abergavenny	v	Llandeilo
Abertysswg Falcons	26 - 22	Llanhilleth
Bala	12 - 27	Penclawdd
Bangor	0 - 106	Cambrian Welfare RFC
Banwen	23 - 27	Penarth
Bethesda	13 - 36	Cwmbran
Blaina	54 - 7	Bridgend Sports Club RFC
BP R.F.C (Llandarcy) RFC	27 - 14	Bedlinog
Brecon	16 - 14	Nant Conwy
Brynamman	25 - 20	Neath Athletic RFC
Bryncethin	48 - 27	Ammanford
Bryncoch	44 - 3	Blaenavon
Brynithel	39 - 20	Pontardawe
Brynmawr	87 - 0	Pontyates
Caldicot	15 - 0	Fall Bay
Cardiff HSOB RFC	57 - 25	Ynysddu
Cardiff Medicals RFC	v	Aberystwyth University RFC
Cefn Coed	26 - 27	Morriston
Cefneithin	10 - 44	Llangefni
Colwyn Bay	15 - 13	Ruthin
Corus (Port Talbot) RFC	45 - 17	Trebanos
Crumlin	29 - 10	Tenby United RFC
Crymych	14 - 8	Cefn Cribbwr RFC
Cwmtwrch	3 - 57	Felinfoel
Dowlais	v	Llanelli Wanderers RFC
Fairwater	15 - 12	Hirwaun
Furnace United RFC	7 - 8	Llandaff
Glais	0 - 20	Glyncorrwg
Glyncoch	v	Barry
Hartridge	8 - 13	Old Illtydians RFC
Haverfordwest	57 - 18	Pentyrch
Hendy	30 - 37	Denbigh (Dinbych) RFC
Heol y Cyw	36 - 28	Newcastle Emlyn
Kenfig Hill	14 - 18	Pontyberem
Kidwelly	10 - 14	Maesteg Celtic
Lampeter Town	33 - 24	Vardre
Laugharne RFC	v	Cardiff University RFC
Llandaff North RFC	26 - 15	Abercwmboi RFC
Llandudno RFC	52 - 5	Abercarn RFC
Llangwm RFC	5 - 81	Tredegar RFC
Llanidloes RFC	7 - 25	Treorchy RFC
Llanishen RFC	80 - 7	Llandybie RFC
Llantwit Fardre RFC	13 - 21	Nantyffyllon RFC
Llantwit Major RFC	10 - 61	Carmarthen Athletic RFC
Machen RFC	28 - 15	Glynneath RFC
Maesteg Harlequins RFC	45 - 12	Clwb Rygbi Cymry Caerdydd RFC
Milford Haven RFC	13 - 24	Trimsaran RFC
Mold RFC	34 - 33	Monmouth RFC
Mountain Ash RFC	22 - 16	Pontycymmer RFC
Mumbles RFC	55 - 7	Llanybydder RFC
Nantyglo RFC	73 - 0	Bynea RFC
Nantymoel RFC	30 - 14	Gilfach Goch RFC
Nelson RFC	38 - 8	Croesyceiliog RFC
New Tredegar RFC	21 - 22	Tylorstown RFC
Newport HSOB RFC	50 - 12	Dinas Powys RFC
Newtown RFC	39 - 8	Deri RFC
Oakdale RFC	12 - 32	Bettws (Newport) RFC
Ogmore Vale RFC	7 - 82	Garndiffaith RFC
Pembroke RFC	60 - 7	Gowerton RFC
Penallta	29 - 15	Rumney RFC
Pencoed RFC	61 - 0	Cardigan RFC
Penygroes RFC	17 - 26	Aberystwyth RFC
Pill Harriers RFC	24 - 7	Rhymney RFC
Pontyclun RFC	v	Rhydyfelin RFC
Pwllheli RFC	75 - 15	Talywain RFC
Resolven RFC	31 - 19	Betws RFC
Rhigos RFC	5 - 33	Ferndale RFC
Rhyl and District RFC	8 - 21	Pontypool United RFC
Risca RFC	21 - 0	Baglan RFC
RTB (Ebbw Vale) RFC	6 - 46	Crynant (Creunant) RFC
Senghenydd RFC	19 - 36	Porth Harlequins
Seven Sisters RFC	39 - 27	Briton Ferry RFC
Skewen RFC	18 - 17	Gorseinon RFC
St. Albans RFC	5 - 34	Cwmavon RFC
St. Clears RFC	19 - 27	Cowbridge RFC
St. Joseph's RFC	21 - 18	Pontarddulais RFC
St. Peters RFC	37 - 3	Porthcawl RFC
Swansea Uplands RFC	5 - 84	Cwmgors RFC
Taibach RFC	12 - 20	Gwernyfed RFC
Tonmawr RFC	106 - 12	Pontllanfraith RFC
Tonna RFC	v	Aberavon Green Stars RFC
Tonyrefail RFC	6 - 45	Llantrisant RFC
Tredegar Ironsides RFC	43 - 8	Pyle RFC
Treherbert RFC	9 - 5	Taffs Well RFC
Trinant RFC	29 - 31	Cilfynydd RFC
Tumble RFC	72 - 0	St. Davids RFC
Usk RFC	17 - 14	Rhiwbina RFC
Welshpool RFC	12 - 60	Caernarfon RFC
Wrexham RFC	0 - 64	Tondu RFC
Ynysybwl RFC	v	Fishguard and Goodwick RFC
Ystalyfera RFC	10 - 12	Trefil RFC
Ystradgynlais RFC	29 - 7	Neyland RFC
Saturday 16 September, 2:30pm
Penygraig RFC	v	Amman United RFC

== Round 2 ==
Saturday 30 September, 2:30pm
Aberavon Quins	21 - 25	Pencoed
Abergavenny	0 - 7	Tonna
Aberystwyth	v	Laugharne
Bettws (Newport) RFC	13 - 3	Pontypool United
Brynamman	8 - 10	Seven Sisters
Bryncoch	8 - 41	Treherbert
Caernarfon	15 - 0	Old Illtydians RFC
Caldicot	0 - 46	Garndiffaith
Cambrian Welfare RFC	29 - 12	Glyncorrwg
Cardiff HSOB	32 - 34	Fairwater
Cardiff Medicals RFC	10 - 31	Nantyffyllon
Cilfynydd	22 - 29	Denbigh (Dinbych) RFC
Cowbridge	16 - 36	Abertysswg Falcons
Crymych	0 - 56	Mumbles
Cwmbran	0 - 13	Felinfoel
Ferndale	16 - 22	Tylorstown
Glyncoch	17 - 26	Penallta
Gwernyfed	12 - 16	Llandaff North
Heol y Cyw	46 - 5	Risca
Lampeter Town	22 - 13	Pill Harriers
Llandaff	31 - 23	Crumlin
Llandudno	18 - 20	Skewen
Llangefni	29 - 24	Aberdare
Llanishen	42 - 8	Newtown
Llantrisant	66 - 15	Cwmgors
Maesteg Celtic	18 - 9	Dolgellau
Mold	23 - 29	Corus (Port Talbot) RFC
Morriston	18 - 3	Machen
Mountain Ash	48 - 15	Haverfordwest
Nantymoel	8 - 16	Penclawdd
Nelson	57 - 5	Trefil
Pembroke	5 - 25	Maesteg Harlequins
Penarth	15 - 22	Bryncethin
Pontardawe	3 - 59	Ynysybwl
Pontyberem	36 - 7	Newport HSOB
Pwllheli	v	Blaina
Resolven	18 - 13	Tredegar Ironsides
Rhydyfelin	70 - 0	Colwyn Bay
St. Peters	31 - 14	Porth Harlequins
Tondu	34 - 9	Dowlais
Tonmawr	34 - 6	Cwmavon
Tredegar	80 - 0	Crynant (Creunant) RFC
Treorchy	15 - 0	BP R.F.C (Llandarcy) RFC
Trimsaran	31 - 15	St. Joseph's
Tumble	v	Brynmawr
Usk	11 - 22	Brecon
Ystradgynlais	13 - 15	Nantyglo

== Round 3 ==
Saturday 21 October, 2:30pm
(D1E) Abercynon	35 - 13	Skewen
Abertysswg Falcons	10 - 55	Bridgend Athletic (D1W)
(D1E) Bargoed	22 - 13	Cambrian Welfare
(D1E) Beddau	v	Tylorstown
Bettws (Newport)	17 - 55	Caernarfon
(D1W) Carmarthen Quins	v	Resolven
(D1W) Cwmllynfell	46 - 16	UWIC (D1E)
Denbigh (Dinbych)	10 - 29	Caerphilly (D1E)
(D1W) Dunvant	7 - 25	Bonymaen (D1W)
Heol y Cyw	28 - 12	Aberystwyth
Llandaff North	27 - 20	Builth Wells
(D1W) Llangennech	36 - 30	Corus (Port Talbot)
Llanishen	20 - 5	Trimsaran
(D1W) Loughor	31 - 8	Brecon
Maesteg Celtic	v	Bryncethin
(D1W) Merthyr	35 - 17	Waunarlwydd (D1W)
Morriston	10 - 12	Seven Sisters
Mountain Ash	0 - 25	Llantrisant
Mumbles	20 - 15	Blackwood (D1E)
Nantyffyllon	30 - 5	Fairwater
Nantyglo	21 - 12	Llandaff
(D1W) Narberth	35 - 6	Felinfoel
(D1E) Newport Saracens	v	Treherbert
Penallta	24 - 14	Carmarthen Athletic
Penclawdd	20 - 12	Nelson
Pencoed	20 - 11	Lampeter Town
Pontyberem	13 - 16	Fleur de Lys (D1E)
Pwllheli	12 - 9	Rhydyfelin
St. Peters	28 - 9	Maesteg Harlequins
Tonmawr	34 - 12	Tondu
Tonna	8 - 23	Newbridge (D1E)
Tredegar	19 - 11	Llanharan (D1E)
Treorchy	10 - 19	Pontypool (D1E)
(D1W) Whitland	66 - 10	Llangefni
Ynysybwl	43 - 7	Tumble
Saturday 28 October, 2:30pm
(D1E) Ystrad Rhondda	40 - 0	Garndiffaith

== Round 4 ==
Saturday 16 December, 2:30pm
(D1E) Abercynon	29 - 24	Pwllheli
(D1E) Beddau	59 - 3	Caernarfon
(D1W) Carmarthen Quins	22 - 13	Merthyr (D1W)
(D1W) Cwmllynfell	15 - 7	Bargoed (D1E)
(D1E) Fleur de Lys	17 - 26	Bridgend Athletic (D1W)
Heol y Cyw	17 - 20	Pontypool (D1E)
Llandaff North	15 - 39	St. Peters
(D1W) Llangennech	39 - 5	Mumbles
Llanishen	25 - 0	Newport Saracens (D1E)
(D1W) Loughor	40 - 14	Ynysybwl
Maesteg Celtic	10 - 32	Caerphilly (D1E)
Nantyffyllon	15 - 9	Ystrad Rhondda (D1E)
(D1W) Narberth	19 - 13	Penallta
(D1E) Newbridge	24 - 11	Llantrisant
Penclawdd	21 - 33	Whitland (D1W)
Seven Sisters	30 - 10	Nantyglo
Tonmawr	28 - 8	Pencoed
Tredegar	5 - 32	Bonymaen (D1W)

== Round 5 ==
Saturday 27 January, 2:30pm
(D1E) Beddau	v	Neath (PD)
(D1W) Bonymaen	v	Newport (PD)
(PD) Bridgend	v	Abercynon (D1E)
(D1E) Caerphilly	v	Carmarthen Quins (D1W)
(PD) Cardiff Rugby	v	Narberth (D1W)
(D1W) Cwmllynfell	v	Aberavon (PD)
(PD) Llandovery	v	Nantyffyllon
(D1W) Llangennech	v	Ebbw Vale (PD)
(PD) Maesteg	v	Bridgend Athletic (D1W)
(D1E) Newbridge	v	Pontypridd (PD)
(D1E) Pontypool	v	Bedwas (PD)
Seven Sisters	v	Llanelli (PD)
St. Peters	v	Llanishen
(PD) Swansea	v	Loughor (D1W)
(PD) The Wanderers	v	Tonmawr
(D1W) Whitland	v	Cross Keys (PD)

== Round 6 ==
Saturday 17 February, 2:30pm
(PD) Bridgend	66 - 3	St. Peters
(PD) Cross Keys	15 - 27	Aberavon (PD)
(PD) Ebbw Vale	16 - 18	Swansea (PD)
(PD) Llandovery	37 - 13	Caerphilly (D1E)
(PD) Neath	10 - 12	Cardiff Rugby (PD)
(PD) Newport	3 - 17	Llanelli (PD)
(PD) Pontypridd	37 - 9	Maesteg (PD)
(PD) The Wanderers	19 - 20	Bedwas (PD)

== Quarter finals ==
Saturday 24 March, 2:30pm
(PD) Aberavon	19 - 20	Bridgend (PD)
(PD) Bedwas	14 - 21	Llandovery (PD)
Sunday 25 March
2:30pm
(PD) Swansea	8 - 39	Cardiff Rugby (PD)
4:10pm
(PD) Llanelli	37 - 30	Pontypridd (PD)

== Semi finals ==
Saturday 14 April, 6:05pm
(PD) Llandovery	20 - 19	Llanelli (PD)
Sunday 15 April, 4:40pm
(PD) Cardiff Rugby	23 - 16	Bridgend (PD)

== Final ==
Saturday 28 April, 5:30pm
(PD) Cardiff Rugby	18 - 20	Llandovery (PD)
