= 2006–07 in Welsh rugby union =

== Wales ==
=== Six Nations Championship ===
Position	Nation	Games				Points				Table points
Position	Nation	Played	Won	Drawn	Lost	For	Against	Difference	Tries	Table points
1	France	5	4	0	1	155	86	+69	15	8
2	Ireland	5	4	0	1	149	84	+65	17	8
3	England	5	3	0	2	119	115	+4	10	6
4	Italy	5	2	0	3	94	147	−53	9	4
5	Wales	5	1	0	4	86	113	−27	7	2
6	Scotland	5	1	0	4	95	153	−58	7	2

=== Six Nations results ===
4 February 2007

Wales	9 – 19	Ireland

Millennium Stadium, Cardiff

10 February 2007

Scotland	21 – 9	Wales

Murrayfield, Edinburgh

24 February 2007

France	32 – 21	Wales

Stade de France, Saint-Denis

10 March 2007

Italy	23 – 20	Wales

Stadio Flaminio, Rome

17 March 2007

Wales	27 – 18	England

Millennium Stadium, Cardiff

== Magners League ==
2006–07 Magners League Table
Club	Played	Won	Drawn	Lost	Points for	Points against	Bonus points	Points
(Wales) Ospreys	20	14	0	6	461	374	8	64
(Wales) Cardiff Blues	20	13	1	6	447	327	9	63
(Ireland) Leinster	20	12	1	7	472	376	11	61
(Wales) Llanelli Scarlets	20	12	0	8	490	417	9	57
(Ireland) Ulster	20	11	1	8	423	310	9	55
(Ireland) Munster	20	12	0	8	379	294	6	54
(Scotland) Glasgow Warriors	20	11	0	9	434	419	5	49
(Scotland) Edinburgh Rugby	20	8	1	11	335	423	8	42
(Wales) Newport Gwent Dragons	20	8	0	12	353	362	7	39
(Ireland) Connacht	20	4	2	14	326	474	6	26
(Scotland) Border Reivers	20	2	0	18	201	545	4	12
Correct as of 2007-05-12

== Welsh Premier Division ==
2006-07 Principality Welsh Premiership League Table
Club	Played	Won	Drawn	Lost	Points for	Points against	Points difference	Points
Neath RFC	26	17	2	7	704	473	+231	53
Ebbw Vale RFC	26	16	3	7	557	503	+54	51
Newport RFC	26	16	2	8	619	480	+139	50
Pontypridd RFC	26	16	1	9	543	504	+39	49
Llanelli RFC	26	12	2	12	629	509	+120	38
Glamorgan Wanderers RFC	26	12	2	12	577	602	-25	38
Aberavon RFC	26	12	2	12	603	615	-12	38
Cardiff RFC	26	12	1	13	601	580	+21	37
Swansea RFC	26	12	0	14	487	611	-124	36
Bedwas RFC	26	11	1	14	446	524	-78	34
Bridgend Ravens	26	11	0	15	461	508	-47	33
Maesteg RFC	26	10	0	16	531	596	-65	30
Cross Keys RFC	26	9	2	15	485	528	-43	29
Llandovery RFC	26	7	0	19	482	692	-210	21
Correct as of 2007-04-18

== WRU Division One East ==
Beddau RFC won the Division One East League, but were denied promotion to the Premier League as their grounds were deemed to not meet WRU criteria. This ruling was upheld in an EGM by 67% of members.

2006-07 WRU Division One East League Table
Club	Played	Won	Drawn	Lost	Points for	Points against	Tries for	Points
Beddau RFC	22	19	0	3	654	321	85	57
Bargoed RFC	22	17	0	5	665	436	89	51
Newbridge RFC	22	17	0	5	516	281	63	51
Pontypool RFC	22	15	0	7	515	370	59	45
Fleur De Lys RFC	22	10	0	12	422	523	49	30
UWIC RFC	22	9	1	12	625	604	74	28
Newport Saracens RFC	22	9	1	12	368	457	46	28
Llanharan RFC	22	9	0	13	546	565	66	27
Caerphilly RFC	22	9	0	14	402	572	47	24
Blackwood RFC	22	6	1	15	433	511	51	19
Abercynon RFC	22	5	2	15	365	718	45	17
Ystrad Rhondda RFC	22	5	1	16	417	570	47	16
Correct as of 2007-08-15

== Division One West ==
Bonymaen RFC won the Division One West League, but were denied promotion to the Premier League as their grounds were deemed to not meet WRU criteria. This ruling was upheld in an EGM by 67% of members.

2006-07 WRU Division One West League Table
Club	Played	Won	Drawn	Lost	Points for	Points against	TF	Points
Bonymaen RFC	22	18	0	4	572	296	67	54
Carmarthen RFC	22	16	0	6	539	297	61	48
Narberth RFC	22	13	0	9	512	463	69	39
Bridgend Athletic RFC	22	12	1	9	500	446	61	37
Whitland RFC	22	11	2	9	410	381	51	35
Merthyr RFC	22	11	0	11	484	421	68	33
Llangennech RFC	22	10	1	11	474	525	59	31
Cwmllynfell RFC	22	10	1	11	490	530	57	31
Dunvant RFC	22	9	0	13	312	419	40	27
Waunarlwydd RFC	22	6	1	15	390	546	48	19
Builth Wells RFC	22	6	1	15	340	584	42	19
Loughor RFC	22	6	1	15	409	524	40	19
Correct as of 2007-08-15

== Division Two East ==
2006-07 WRU Division Two East League Table
Club	Played	Won	Drawn	Lost	Points for	Points against	Tries for	Points
Llantrisant RFC	22	22	0	0	642	309	83	66
Rumney RFC	22	17	0	5	680	403	94	51
Treherbert RFC	22	15	0	7	517	448	61	45
Tredegar RFC	22	14	0	8	595	397	81	42
Ynysybwl RFC	22	11	0	11	497	484	62	33
Rhydyfelin RFC	22	10	0	12	461	475	62	30
Nantymoel RFC	22	8	1	13	432	505	55	25
Mountain Ash RFC	22	8	1	13	360	430	46	25
Pill Harriers RFC	22	8	0	14	396	484	50	24
Llantwit Fardre RFC	22	7	0	15	384	472	49	21
Croesyceiliog RFC	22	6	2	14	435	729	56	20
Abergavenny RFC	22	4	0	18	376	639	54	12
Correct as of 2007-08-15

== Division Two West ==
2006-07 WRU Division Two West League Table
Club	Played	Won	Drawn	Lost	Points for	Points against	TF	Points
Tonmawr RFC	22	19	2	1	756	256	113	59
Corus (Port Talbot) RFC	22	19	0	3	670	264	86	57
Carmarthen Athletic RFC	22	13	0	9	548	336	69	39
Cmwavon RFC	22	11	3	8	447	366	58	36
Felinfoel RFC	22	11	0	11	421	552	51	33
Kidwelly RFC	22	11	0	11	418	543	47	33
Pontyberem RFC	22	10	1	11	457	433	49	31
Penclawdd RFC	22	10	0	12	415	318	43	30
Gorseinon RFC	22	9	1	12	383	488	47	28
Maesteg Harlequins RFC	22	7	1	14	394	563	45	22
Tonna RFC	22	5	0	17	340	634	43	15
Seven Sisters RFC	22	3	0	19	281	714	30	9
Correct as of 2007-08-15
