= WRU League 2 West =

Rugby union league in Wales

WRU Division Two West
- Founded: 1995
- No. of teams: 12
- Country: Wales
- Most recent champion: Maesteg Harlequins RFC (2013–14)
- Level on pyramid: 4
- Promotion to: WRU League 1 West
- Relegation to: WRU Division Three West, WRU Division Three South West
- Website: www.wru.co.uk/eng/club/swalecleagues/index.php

The Welsh Rugby Union League 2 West (also called the SWALEC League 2 West for sponsorship reasons) is a rugby union league in Wales.

== Competition format and sponsorship ==
=== Competition ===
There are 12 clubs in the WRU League 2 West. During the course of a season (which lasts from September to May) each club plays the others twice, once at their home ground and once at that of their opponents for a total of 22 games for each club, with a total of 132 games in each season. Teams receive four points for a win and two point for a draw, an additional bonus point is awarded to either team if they score four tries or more in a single match. No points are awarded for a loss though the losing team can gain a bonus point for finishing the match within seven points of the winning team. Teams are ranked by total points, then the number of tries scored and then points difference. At the end of each season, the club with the most points is crowned as champion. If points are equal the tries scored then points difference determines the winner. The team who is declared champion at the end of the season is eligible for promotion to the WRU League 1 West. The two lowest placed teams are relegated into the WRU Division Three West or WRU Division Three South West depending on geographical location.

=== Sponsorship ===
In 2008 the Welsh Rugby Union announced a new sponsorship deal for the club rugby leagues with SWALEC valued at £1 million (GBP). The initial three year sponsorship was extended at the end of the 2010/11 season, making SWALEC the league sponsors until 2015. The leagues sponsored are the WRU Divisions one through to seven.

- (2002-2005) Lloyds TSB
- (2005-2008) Asda
- (2008-2015) SWALEC

== 2011/12 Season ==
=== League teams ===
- Aberavon Quins RFC
- Aberystwyth RFC
- Builth Wells RFC
- Crymych RFC
- Cwmllynfell RFC
- Felinfoel RFC
- Glynneath RFC
- Kenfig Hill RFC
- Kidwelly RFC
- Loughor RFC
- Maesteg RFC
- Skewen RFC

=== 2011/2012 table ===
2011-12 WRU Division Two West League Table
	Club	Played	Won	Drawn	Lost	Points for	Points against	Tries for	Tries against	Try bonus	Losing bonus	Points
1	Glynneath RFC	22	19	0	3	706	237	100	27	15	2	93
2	Kenfig Hill RFC	22	19	0	3	669	301	90	33	9	3	88
3	Cwmllynfell RFC	22	14	2	6	643	368	89	49	10	1	71
4	Loughor RFC	22	12	1	9	487	412	58	42	8	4	62
5	Aberavon Quins RFC	22	13	0	9	432	483	54	60	6	2	60
6	Skewen RFC	22	12	1	9	359	320	44	35	3	5	58
7	Kidwelly RFC	22	11	1	10	419	437	50	57	6	3	55
8	Builth Wells RFC	22	10	1	11	527	374	69	38	6	6	54
9	Felinfoel RFC	22	8	0	14	319	485	39	59	2	4	38
10	Crymych RFC	22	6	0	16	347	548	37	74	3	2	29
11	Aberystwyth RFC	22	3	1	18	350	607	42	83	1	8	23
12	Maesteg RFC	22	1	1	20	255	941	30	145	2	2	10
Correct as of 26 May 2012

== 2010/2011 Season ==
=== League teams ===
- Aberavon Quins RFC
- Aberystwyth RFC
- Ammanford RFC
- BP Llandarcy RFC
- Builth Wells
- Cwmllynfell RFC
- Kidwelly RFC
- Loughor RFC
- Newcastle Emlyn RFC
- Pontyberem RFC
- Skewen RFC
- Tondu RFC

=== 2010/2011 table ===
2010-11 WRU Division Two West League Table
	Club	Played	Won	Drawn	Lost	Points for	Points against	Tries for	Tries against	Try bonus	Losing bonus	Points
1	Ammanford RFC	22	20	0	2	751	373	100	40	15	1	96
2	Tondu RFC	22	16	1	5	599	441	84	60	10	1	77
3	Kidwelly RFC	22	13	0	9	477	439	53	47	7	5	64
4	Builth Wells RFC	22	12	0	10	476	388	60	38	7	7	62
5	Loughor RFC	22	12	1	9	548	529	63	69	6	3	59
6	Cwmllynfell RFC	22	11	1	10	553	603	69	74	9	4	59
7	Aberystwyth RFC	22	11	0	11	510	541	60	74	7	1	52
8	Skewen RFC	22	11	1	10	443	413	58	51	4	2	52
9	Aberavon Quins RFC	22	7	2	13	454	480	64	57	9	6	47
10	Newcastle Emlyn RFC	22	6	1	15	487	634	55	80	7	5	38
11	BP (Llandarcy) RFC	22	4	3	15	324	461	34	53	2	7	31
12	Pontyberem RFC	22	4	0	18	330	650	34	91	2	7	25
Correct as of 26 May 2012

== 2009/2010 Season ==
=== League teams ===
- Aberavon Quins RFC
- Aberystwyth RFC
- Ammanford RFC
- BP Llandarcy RFC
- Dunvant RFC
- Kidwelly RFC
- Loughor RFC
- Maesteg RFC
- Mumbles RFC
- Pencoed RFC
- Pontyberem RFC
- Waunarlwydd RFC

=== 2009/2010 table ===
2009-10 WRU Division Two West League Table
Club	Played	Won	Drawn	Lost	Points for	Points against	Tries for	Tries against	Try bonus	Losing bonus	Points
Maesteg RFC	22	19	2	1	615	271	78	24	12	0	92
Waunarlwydd RFC	22	14	1	7	594	359	73	38	10	5	73
BP Llandarcy RFC	22	14	1	7	376	320	43	36	3	5	66
Kidwelly RFC	22	13	0	9	558	393	68	39	6	6	64
Aberavon Quins RFC	22	13	0	9	449	424	56	45	6	3	61
Ammanford RFC	22	11	1	10	409	348	45	33	4	8	58
Loughor RFC	22	10	1	11	427	479	47	60	5	4	51
Aberystwyth RFC	22	10	0	12	390	509	46	71	5	4	49
Pontyberem RFC	22	10	0	12	353	520	35	67	4	3	47
Mumbles RFC	22	7	1	14	372	471	51	55	5	4	39
Pencoed RFC	22	3	0	19	321	505	34	62	0	10	22
Dunvant RFC	22	4	1	17	324	589	33	79	0	2	20
Correct as of 3 August 2010

== 2008/2009 Season ==
=== League teams ===
- Ammanford RFC
- BP Llandarcy RFC
- Bridgend Athletic RFC
- Builth Wells RFC
- Cwmavon RFC
- Gorseinon RFC
- Kidwelly RFC
- Loughor RFC
- Mumbles RFC
- Penclawdd RFC
- Pencoed RFC
- Waunarlwydd RFC

=== 2008/2009 table ===
2008-09 WRU Division Two West League Table
Club	Played	Won	Drawn	Lost	Points for	Points against	Tries for	Tries against	Try bonus	Losing bonus	Points
Bridgend Athletic RFC	22	16	0	6	523	303	68	31	10	4	78
Builth Wells RFC	22	17	0	5	473	305	57	29	7	2	77
Kidwelly RFC	22	14	1	7	532	386	63	45	5	3	66
Loughor RFC	22	13	1	8	532	388	69	43	9	1	64
Ammanford RFC	22	13	0	9	447	394	58	51	6	4	62
Waunarlwydd RFC	22	12	2	8	504	439	57	55	6	3	61
Pencoed RFC	22	13	0	9	425	328	53	36	4	4	60
BP RFC	22	9	1	12	367	358	39	43	2	7	47
Mumbles RFC	22	8	2	12	373	450	50	56	4	4	44
Cwmavon RFC	22	6	2	14	332	515	39	66	3	5	36
Penclawdd RFC	22	4	1	17	263	520	28	68	1	3	22
Gorseinon RFC	22	2	0	20	340	725	48	106	3	4	15
Correct as of 2009-06-7

== 2007/2008 Season ==
Felinfoel were named champions after a perfect season and were promoted to Division One West along with second placed Carmarthen Athletic. Tumble, Nantymoel and Pontyberem were relegated after finishing in the last three places.

=== League teams ===
- Carmarthen Athletic RFC
- Cwmavon RFC
- Felinfoel RFC
- Gorseinon RFC
- Kidwelly RFC
- Loughor RFC
- Mumbles RFC
- Nantymoel RFC
- Penclawdd RFC
- Pencoed RFC
- Pontyberem RFC
- Tumble RFC

=== 2007/2008 table ===
2007-08 WRU Division Two West League Table
Club	Played	Won	Drawn	Lost	Points for	Points against	Tries for	Tries against	Try bonus	Losing bonus	Points
Felinfoel RFC	22	22	0	0	662	266	83	32	10	0	98
Carmarthen Athletic RFC	22	18	1	3	606	263	81	28	11	2	87
Loughor RFC	22	16	0	6	546	365	70	41	8	3	75
Mumbles RFC	22	13	1	8	515	416	68	51	10	3	67
Pencoed RFC	22	13	1	8	585	329	78	33	9	3	66
Kidwelly RFC	22	11	0	11	474	400	54	54	7	6	57
Cwmavon RFC	22	11	1	10	352	364	47	46	4	2	52
Penclawdd RFC	22	9	0	13	394	429	47	55	4	3	43
Gorseinon RFC	22	8	0	14	401	437	53	56	5	5	42
Pontyberem RFC	22	6	0	16	289	435	35	58	2	6	32
Tumble RFC	22	1	1	20	291	721	35	102	2	4	12
Nantymoel RFC	22	1	1	20	160	850	22	117	0	0	6
Correct as of 2008-05-27

== 2006/2007 Season ==
See 2006–07 in Welsh rugby union

== Winners ==
Season	Winners	Name of league
2006-07	Tonmawr RFC	WRU Division Two West
2007-08	Felinfoel RFC	WRU Division Two West
2008-09	Bridgend Athletic RFC	WRU League 2 West
2009-10	Maesteg RFC	WRU League 2 West
2010-11	Ammanford RFC	WRU League 2 West
2011-12	Glynneath RFC	WRU League 2 West
2012-13	Builth Wells RFC	WRU League 2 West
2013-14	Maesteg Harlequins RFC	WRU League 2 West
2014-15		WRU League 2 West
