= 2006–07 WRU Division Two West =

The 2006–07 WRU Division Two West or 2006–07 Asda Division Two West for sponsorship reasons was the sixteenth WRU Division Two West. The season began on Saturday 2 September and ended on Saturday 5 May. Twelve teams played each other on a home and away basis. This was also the last season where teams earned three points for a win and one point for a draw.

== Table ==
Pos	Team	Pld	W	D	L	PF	PA	PD	TF	TA	Pts
1	Tonmawr	22	19	2	1	756	256	+500	113	25	59
2	Corus (Port Talbot)	22	19	0	3	670	264	+406	86	26	57
3	Carmarthen Athletic	22	13	0	9	548	336	+212	69	40	39
4	Cwmavon	22	11	3	8	447	366	+81	58	34	36
5	Felinfoel	22	11	0	11	421	552	−131	51	74	33
6	Kidwelly	22	11	0	11	418	543	−125	47	68	33
7	Pontyberem	22	10	1	11	457	433	+24	49	50	31
8	Penclawdd	22	10	0	12	415	381	+34	43	48	30
9	Gorseinon	22	9	1	12	383	488	−105	47	60	28
10	Maesteg Harlequins	22	7	1	14	394	563	−169	45	73	22
11	Tonna	22	5	0	17	340	634	−294	43	85	15
12	Seven Sisters	22	3	0	19	281	714	−433	30	98	9

== Results ==
=== Matchday 1 ===
Saturday 2 September, 2:30pm
Carmarthen Athletic RFC	13 - 12	Corus (Port Talbot) RFC
Cwmavon RFC	29 - 13	Maesteg Harlequins RFC
Felinfoel RFC	12 - 37	Tonmawr RFC
Gorseinon RFC	12 - 16	Pontyberem RFC
Seven Sisters RFC	0 - 13	Penclawdd RFC
Tonna RFC	12 - 27	Kidwelly RFC

=== Matchday 2 ===
Saturday 16 September, 2:30pm
Corus (Port Talbot) RFC	41 - 10	Seven Sisters RFC
Kidwelly RFC	23 - 20	Cwmavon RFC
Maesteg Harlequins RFC	14 - 19	Carmarthen Athletic RFC
Penclawdd RFC	9 - 17	Gorseinon RFC
Pontyberem RFC	19 - 24	Felinfoel RFC
Tonmawr RFC	53 - 15	Tonna RFC

=== Matchday 3 (5/6) ===
Saturday 23 September, 2:30pm
Cwmavon RFC	24 - 24	Tonmawr RFC
Felinfoel RFC	25 - 17	Penclawdd RFC
Gorseinon RFC	19 - 64	Corus (Port Talbot) RFC
Maesteg Harlequins RFC	18 - 27	Kidwelly RFC
Seven Sisters RFC	14 - 68	Carmarthen Athletic RFC

=== Matchday 4 ===
Saturday 7 October, 2:30pm
Carmarthen Athletic RFC	15 - 10	Kidwelly RFC
Corus (Port Talbot) RFC	41 - 7	Felinfoel RFC
Penclawdd RFC	3 - 0	Tonna RFC
Pontyberem RFC	27 - 15	Cwmavon RFC
Seven Sisters RFC	37 - 14	Gorseinon RFC
Tonmawr RFC	63 - 14	Maesteg Harlequins RFC

=== Matchday 5 ===
Saturday 14 October, 2:30pm
Cwmavon RFC	20 - 16	Penclawdd RFC
Felinfoel RFC	33 - 7	Seven Sisters RFC
Gorseinon RFC	10 - 43	Carmarthen Athletic RFC
Kidwelly RFC	10 - 57	Tonmawr RFC
Maesteg Harlequins RFC	9 - 17	Pontyberem RFC
Tonna RFC	11 - 27	Corus (Port Talbot) RFC

=== Matchday 6 ===
Saturday 28 October, 2:30pm
Carmarthen Athletic RFC	6 - 13	Tonmawr RFC
Corus (Port Talbot) RFC	17 - 15	Cwmavon RFC
Gorseinon RFC	8 - 3	Felinfoel RFC
Penclawdd RFC	27 - 28	Maesteg Harlequins RFC
Pontyberem RFC	22 - 5	Kidwelly RFC
Seven Sisters RFC	9 - 14	Tonna RFC

=== Matchday 7 (5/6) ===
Saturday 18 November, 2:30pm
Cwmavon RFC	13 - 6	Seven Sisters RFC
Felinfoel RFC	8 - 21	Carmarthen Athletic RFC
Kidwelly RFC	20 - 17	Penclawdd RFC
Tonmawr RFC	16 - 11	Pontyberem RFC
Tonna RFC	7 - 9	Gorseinon RFC

=== Matchday 8 (5/6) ===
Saturday 2 December, 2:30pm
Carmarthen Athletic RFC	30 - 16	Pontyberem RFC
Corus (Port Talbot) RFC	59 - 7	Kidwelly RFC
Felinfoel RFC	37 - 17	Tonna RFC
Gorseinon RFC	9 - 9	Cwmavon RFC
Penclawdd RFC	8 - 22	Tonmawr RFC

=== Matchday 9 ===
Saturday 9 December, 2:30pm
Cwmavon RFC	47 - 12	Felinfoel RFC
Kidwelly RFC	30 - 12	Seven Sisters RFC
Maesteg Harlequins RFC	13 - 20	Gorseinon RFC
Pontyberem RFC	26 - 15	Penclawdd RFC
Tonmawr RFC	15 - 10	Corus (Port Talbot) RFC
Tonna RFC	10 - 17	Carmarthen Athletic RFC

=== Matchday 10 (4/6) ===
Saturday 16 December, 2:30pm
Corus (Port Talbot) RFC	27 - 19	Pontyberem RFC
Felinfoel RFC	28 - 17	Maesteg Harlequins RFC
Gorseinon RFC	23 - 22	Kidwelly RFC
Tonna RFC	14 - 19	Cwmavon RFC

=== Matchday 11 (1/6) ===
Saturday 30 December, 2:30pm
Tonmawr RFC	25 - 15	Gorseinon RFC

=== Matchday 12 (4/6) ===
Saturday 6 January, 2:30pm
Corus (Port Talbot) RFC	18 - 12	Carmarthen Athletic RFC
Kidwelly RFC	22 - 23	Tonna RFC
Penclawdd RFC	35 - 10	Seven Sisters RFC
Pontyberem RFC	15 - 23	Gorseinon RFC

=== Matchday 13 ===
Saturday 13 January, 2:30pm
Carmarthen Athletic RFC	3 - 10	Maesteg Harlequins RFC
Cwmavon RFC	8 - 11	Kidwelly RFC
Felinfoel RFC	24 - 3	Pontyberem RFC
Gorseinon RFC	5 - 17	Penclawdd RFC
Seven Sisters RFC	3 - 11	Corus (Port Talbot) RFC
Tonna RFC	6 - 14	Tonmawr RFC

=== Matchday 14 (5/6) ===
Saturday 20 January, 2:30pm
Carmarthen Athletic RFC	62 - 0	Seven Sisters RFC
Corus (Port Talbot) RFC	23 - 8	Gorseinon RFC
Kidwelly RFC	21 - 15	Maesteg Harlequins RFC
Penclawdd RFC	36 - 24	Felinfoel RFC
Pontyberem RFC	27 - 10	Tonna RFC

=== Matchday 15 (4/6) ===
Saturday 27 January, 2:30pm
Cwmavon RFC	25 - 25	Pontyberem RFC
Felinfoel RFC	10 - 36	Corus (Port Talbot) RFC
Kidwelly RFC	27 - 20	Carmarthen Athletic RFC
Tonna RFC	7 - 41	Penclawdd RFC

=== Matchday 16 ===
Saturday 3 February, 2:30pm
Carmarthen Athletic RFC	30 - 6	Gorseinon RFC
Corus (Port Talbot) RFC	27 - 14	Tonna RFC
Penclawdd RFC	19 - 29	Cwmavon RFC
Pontyberem RFC	49 - 20	Maesteg Harlequins RFC
Seven Sisters RFC	15 - 28	Felinfoel RFC
Tonmawr RFC	62 - 7	Kidwelly RFC

=== Matchday 17 (5/6) ===
Saturday 17 February, 2:30pm
Cwmavon RFC	20 - 16	Corus (Port Talbot) RFC
Felinfoel RFC	23 - 13	Gorseinon RFC
Maesteg Harlequins RFC	10 - 9	Penclawdd RFC
Tonna RFC	16 - 13	Seven Sisters RFC
Saturday 24 February, 2:00pm
Kidwelly RFC	20 - 28	Pontyberem RFC

=== Matchday 18 ===
Saturday 3 March, 2:30pm
Carmarthen Athletic RFC	39 - 25	Felinfoel RFC
Corus (Port Talbot) RFC	33 - 3	Maesteg Harlequins RFC
Gorseinon RFC	48 - 11	Tonna RFC
Penclawdd RFC	26 - 5	Kidwelly RFC
Pontyberem RFC	19 - 36	Tonmawr RFC
Seven Sisters RFC	12 - 24	Cwmavon RFC

=== Matchday 10 (5/6) ===
Friday 9 March, 7:15pm
Carmarthen Athletic RFC	3 - 15	Penclawdd RFC

=== Matchday 19 ===
Saturday 24 March, 2:30pm
Cwmavon RFC	22 - 20	Gorseinon RFC
Kidwelly RFC	17 - 41	Corus (Port Talbot) RFC
Maesteg Harlequins RFC	54 - 10	Seven Sisters RFC
Pontyberem RFC	18 - 10	Carmarthen Athletic RFC
Tonmawr RFC	24 - 10	Penclawdd RFC
Tonna RFC	16 - 33	Felinfoel RFC

=== Matchday 20 ===
Saturday 31 March, 2:30pm
Carmarthen Athletic RFC	69 - 29	Tonna RFC
Corus (Port Talbot) RFC	14 - 13	Tonmawr RFC
Felinfoel RFC	20 - 10	Cwmavon RFC
Gorseinon RFC	33 - 0	Maesteg Harlequins RFC
Penclawdd RFC	21 - 7	Pontyberem RFC
Seven Sisters RFC	15 - 22	Kidwelly RFC

=== Matchday 21 ===
Saturday 7 April, 2:30pm
Cwmavon RFC	57 - 7	Tonna RFC
Kidwelly RFC	24 - 20	Gorseinon RFC
Maesteg Harlequins RFC	36 - 15	Felinfoel RFC
Penclawdd RFC	29 - 16	Carmarthen Athletic RFC
Pontyberem RFC	13 - 32	Corus (Port Talbot) RFC
Tonmawr RFC	88 - 21	Seven Sisters RFC

=== Matchday 22 ===
Saturday 14 April, 2:30pm
Carmarthen Athletic RFC	28 - 7	Cwmavon RFC
Corus (Port Talbot) RFC	40 - 25	Penclawdd RFC
Felinfoel RFC	21 - 17	Kidwelly RFC
Gorseinon RFC	13 - 55	Tonmawr RFC
Seven Sisters RFC	16 - 15	Pontyberem RFC
Tonna RFC	40 - 43	Maesteg Harlequins RFC

=== Mixed matchdays ===
Wednesday 18 April, 7:00pm
Kidwelly RFC	44 - 9	Felinfoel RFC (M 11 - 2/6)
Seven Sisters RFC	33 - 23	Maesteg Harlequins RFC (M 8 - 6/6)

=== Mixed matchdays ===
Saturday 21 April, 2:30pm
Gorseinon RFC	38 - 20	Seven Sisters RFC (M 15 - 5/6)
Maesteg Harlequins RFC	25 - 12	Cwmavon RFC (M 12 - 5/6)
Penclawdd RFC	7 - 43	Corus (Port Talbot) RFC (M 11 - 3/6)
Tonmawr RFC	30 - 21	Carmarthen Athletic RFC (M 17 - 6/6)
Tonna RFC	31 - 20	Pontyberem RFC (M 3 - 6/6)

=== Mixed matchdays ===
Tuesday 24 April, 7:15pm
Cwmavon RFC	15 - 3	Carmarthen Athletic RFC (M 11 - 4/6)
Wednesday 25 April
6:30pm
Maesteg Harlequins RFC	3 - 38	Corus (Port Talbot) RFC (M 7 - 6/6)
7:00pm
Tonmawr RFC	56 - 0	Felinfoel RFC (M 12 - 6/6)

=== Mixed matchdays ===
Saturday 28 April, 2:30pm
Maesteg Harlequins RFC	19 - 30	Tonna RFC (M 11 - 5/6)
Pontyberem RFC	45 - 12	Seven Sisters RFC (M 11 - 6/6)
Tonmawr RFC	19 - 7	Cwmavon RFC (M 14 - 6/6)

=== Matchday 10 (6/6) ===
Wednesday 2 May, 7:00pm
Seven Sisters RFC	6 - 27	Tonmawr RFC

=== Matchday 15 (6/6) ===
Saturday 5 May, 2:30pm
Maesteg Harlequins RFC	7 - 7	Tonmawr RFC
