= 2006–07 WRU Division One West =

The 2006–07 WRU Division One West or 2006–07 Asda Division One West for sponsorship reasons was the sixteenth WRU Division One West and the first season of the WRU Division One West. The season began on Saturday 2 September 2006 and ended on Saturday 28 April 2007. Twelve teams played each other on a home and away basis. This was also the last season where teams earned three points for a win and one point for a draw.

== Table ==
POS	TEAM	PL	W	D	L	PF	PA	DIFF	TF	TA	PTS
1	Bonymaen	22	18	0	4	572	296	276	67	32	54
2	Carmarthen Quins	22	16	0	6	539	297	242	61	35	48
3	Narberth	22	13	0	9	512	463	49	69	51	39
4	Bridgend Athletic	22	12	1	9	500	446	54	61	60	37
5	Whitland	22	11	2	9	410	381	29	51	39	35
6	Merthyr	22	11	0	11	484	421	63	68	49	33
7	Llangennech	22	10	1	11	474	525	-51	59	69	31
8	Cwmllynfell	22	10	1	11	490	530	-40	57	71	31
9	Dunvant	22	9	0	13	312	419	-107	40	49	27
10	Waunarlwydd	22	6	1	15	390	546	-156	48	71	19
11	Builth Wells	22	6	1	15	340	584	-244	42	76	19
12	Loughor	22	6	1	15	409	524	-115	40	61	19

== Results ==
=== Matchday 1 ===
Saturday 2 September 2006, 2:30pm
Bridgend Athletic	30 - 16	Dunvant
Builth Wells	3 - 19	Merthyr
Cwmllynfell	14 - 0	Bonymaen
Llangennech	11 - 22	Narberth
Loughor	29 - 13	Waunarlwydd
Whitland	14 - 10	Carmarthen Quins

=== Matchday 2 ===
Saturday 9 September 2006, 2:30pm
Bonymaen	5 - 26	Carmarthen Quins
Cwmllynfell	24 - 24	Loughor
Dunvant	39 - 13	Builth Wells
Merthyr	15 - 7	Whitland
Narberth	10 - 31	Bridgend Athletic
Waunarlwydd	20 - 34	Llangennech

=== Matchday 3 ===
Saturday 16 September 2006, 2:30pm
Bridgend Athletic	23 - 21	Waunarlwydd
Builth Wells	9 - 37	Narberth
Carmarthen Quins	46 - 10	Merthyr
Llangennech	49 - 28	Cwmllynfell
Loughor	19 - 29	Bonymaen
Whitland	29 - 3	Dunvant

=== Matchday 4 (5/6) ===
Saturday 23 September 2006, 2:30pm
Bonymaen	19 - 0	Merthyr
Cwmllynfell	32 - 8	Bridgend Athletic
Loughor	32 - 29	Llangennech
Narberth	19 - 13	Whitland
Waunarlwydd	23 - 6	Builth Wells

=== Matchday 5 ===
Saturday 30 September 2006, 2:30pm
Bridgend Athletic	21 - 17	Loughor
Builth Wells	16 - 42	Cwmllynfell
Carmarthen Quins	29 - 10	Narberth
Llangennech	18 - 36	Bonymaen
Merthyr	43 - 13	Dunvant
Whitland	27 - 13	Waunarlwydd

=== Matchday 6 ===
Saturday 7 October 2006, 2:30pm
Bonymaen	26 - 8	Dunvant
Cwmllynfell	33 - 24	Whitland
Llangennech	24 - 10	Bridgend Athletic
Loughor	19 - 16	Builth Wells
Narberth	25 - 20	Merthyr
Waunarlwydd	15 - 31	Carmarthen Quins

=== Matchday 7 ===
Saturday 14 October 2006, 2:30pm
Bonymaen	57 - 28	Bridgend Athletic
Builth Wells	29 - 41	Llangennech
Carmarthen Quins	21 - 26	Cwmllynfell
Dunvant	13 - 19	Narberth
Merthyr	41 - 15	Waunarlwydd
Whitland	27 - 31	Loughor

=== Matchday 8 ===
Saturday 28 October 2006, 2:30pm
Bridgend Athletic	30 - 0	Builth Wells
Cwmllynfell	29 - 17	Merthyr
Llangennech	19 - 28	Whitland
Loughor	3 - 13	Carmarthen Quins
Narberth	16 - 18	Bonymaen
Waunarlwydd	11 - 3	Dunvant

=== Matchday 9 ===
Saturday 18 November 2006, 2:30pm
Bonymaen	51 - 0	Builth Wells
Carmarthen Quins	31 - 5	Llangennech
Dunvant	15 - 10	Cwmllynfell
Merthyr	22 - 21	Loughor
Narberth	41 - 12	Waunarlwydd
Whitland	10 - 9	Bridgend Athletic

=== Matchday 10 ===
Saturday 2 December 2006, 2:30pm
Bridgend Athletic	36 - 14	Carmarthen Quins
Builth Wells	12 - 12	Whitland
Cwmllynfell	3 - 22	Narberth
Dunvant	10 - 6	Loughor
Merthyr	20 - 22	Llangennech
Waunarlwydd	12 - 18	Bonymaen

=== Matchday 11 ===
Saturday 9 December 2006, 2:30pm
Bridgend Athletic	24 - 7	Narberth
Builth Wells	3 - 6	Dunvant
Carmarthen Quins	12 - 16	Bonymaen
Llangennech	20 - 17	Waunarlwydd
Loughor	23 - 32	Cwmllynfell
Whitland	14 - 8	Merthyr

=== Matchday 12 (5/6) ===
Saturday 23 December 2006, 2:30pm
Bonymaen	12 - 14	Cwmllynfell
Carmarthen Quins	16 - 0	Whitland
Dunvant	17 - 14	Bridgend Athletic
Narberth	32 - 15	Llangennech
Waunarlwydd	12 - 10	Loughor

=== Matchday 13 (1/6) ===
Saturday 30 December 2006, 2:30pm
Bridgend Athletic	8 - 7	Merthyr

=== Matchday 14 (3/6) ===
Saturday 6 January 2007, 2:30pm
Bonymaen	37 - 12	Loughor
Merthyr	10 - 18	Carmarthen Quins
Waunarlwydd	25 - 25	Bridgend Athletic

=== Matchday 15 ===
Saturday 13 January 2007, 2:30pm
Bridgend Athletic	24 - 9	Cwmllynfell
Builth Wells	20 - 13	Waunarlwydd
Carmarthen Quins	15 - 0	Dunvant
Llangennech	12 - 10	Loughor
Merthyr	5 - 9	Bonymaen
Whitland	9 - 0	Narberth

=== Matchday 16 ===
Saturday 20 January 2007, 2:30pm
Bonymaen	29 - 17	Llangennech
Cwmllynfell	3 - 20	Builth Wells
Dunvant	3 - 5	Merthyr
Loughor	14 - 15	Bridgend Athletic
Narberth	23 - 26	Carmarthen Quins
Waunarlwydd	13 - 3	Whitland

=== Matchday 17 (5/6) ===
Saturday 3 February 2007, 2:30pm
Bridgend Athletic	34 - 7	Llangennech
Builth Wells	17 - 11	Loughor
Dunvant	25 - 16	Bonymaen
Merthyr	26 - 29	Narberth
Whitland	42 - 21	Cwmllynfell

=== Matchday 18 ===
Saturday 17 February 2007, 2:30pm
Bridgend Athletic	13 - 22	Bonymaen
Cwmllynfell	10 - 22	Carmarthen Quins
Llangennech	17 - 18	Builth Wells
Loughor	16 - 15	Whitland
Narberth	20 - 23	Dunvant
Waunarlwydd	7 - 31	Merthyr

=== Matchday 19 (5/6) ===
Saturday 3 March 2007, 2:30pm
Bonymaen	24 - 5	Narberth
Builth Wells	12 - 37	Bridgend Athletic
Dunvant	29 - 23	Waunarlwydd
Merthyr	35 - 27	Cwmllynfell
Whitland	23 - 23	Llangennech

=== Matchday 4 (6/6) ===
Wednesday 7 March 2007, 7:15pm
Dunvant	5 - 32	Carmarthen Quins

=== Mixed matchdays ===
Friday 16 March 2007
2:30pm - Matchday 19 (6/6)
Carmarthen Quins	40 - 3	Loughor
7:30pm - Matchday 14 (4/6)
Dunvant	14 - 21	Whitland

=== Matchday 20 ===
Saturday 24 March 2007, 2:30pm
Bridgend Athletic	31 - 33	Whitland
Builth Wells	10 - 60	Bonymaen
Cwmllynfell	21 - 14	Dunvant
Llangennech	17 - 14	Carmarthen Quins
Loughor	17 - 29	Merthyr
Waunarlwydd	19 - 32	Narberth

=== Matchday 21 ===
Saturday 31 March 2007, 2:30pm
Bonymaen	20 - 0	Waunarlwydd
Carmarthen Quins	42 - 30	Bridgend Athletic
Llangennech	30 - 24	Merthyr
Loughor	24 - 19	Dunvant
Narberth	27 - 23	Cwmllynfell
Whitland	17 - 7	Builth Wells

=== Matchday 22 ===
Saturday 7 April 2007, 2:30pm
Bonymaen	35 - 13	Whitland
Carmarthen Quins	17 - 13	Builth Wells
Dunvant	24 - 28	Llangennech
Merthyr	50 - 19	Bridgend Athletic
Narberth	53 - 41	Loughor
Waunarlwydd	36 - 35	Cwmllynfell

=== Mixed matchdays ===
Saturday 14 April 2007, 2:30pm
Carmarthen Quins	45 - 17	Waunarlwydd (M 17 - 6/6)
Cwmllynfell	31 - 26	Llangennech (M 14 - 5/6)
Loughor	27 - 39	Narberth (M 13 - 2/6)
Merthyr	47 - 40	Builth Wells (M 12 - 6/6)
Whitland	29 - 33	Bonymaen (M 13 - 3/6)

=== Matchday 13 (4/6) ===
Friday 20 April 2007, 7:00pm
Llangennech	10 - 13	Dunvant

=== Mixed matchdays ===
Saturday 21 April 2007, 2:30pm
Cwmllynfell	23 - 53	Waunarlwydd (M 13 - 5/6)
Narberth	24 - 47	Builth Wells (M 14 - 6/6)

=== Matchday 13 (6/6) ===
Saturday 28 April 2007, 2:30pm
Builth Wells	29 - 19	Carmarthen Quins
