= 1993–94 WRU Challenge Cup =

The 1993–94 WRU Challenge Cup, known for sponsorship reasons as the SWALEC Cup, was the 24th WRU Challenge Cup, the annual national rugby union cup competition of Wales. The competition was won by Cardiff who beat Llanelli 15-8 in the final.

== Round 5 ==
Home team	Score	Away team
Abercynon	12-19	Neath
Bonymaen	6-0	Tondu
Bridgend	29-6	Felinfoel
Cardiff RFC	27-3	Oakdale
Dunvant	39-10	Pyle
Kidwelly	6-49	Llanelli
Llandovery	18-3	Mold
Maesteg	9-5	Glamorgan Wanderers
Maesteg Celtic	8-3	Talywain
Narberth	16-6	Nantymoel
Newbridge	32-3	Llanharan
Pontypridd	29-0	Aberavon
South Wales Police	10-3	Caerphilly
Swansea	70-6	Seven Sisters
Tenby United	18-13	Abercrave
Ystradgynlais	10-9	Newport RFC

== Round 6 ==
Home team	Score	Away team
Cardiff	15-6	Bridgend
Dunvant	8-16	Newbridge
Llanelli	57-5	Landovery
Maesteg	11-10	Bonymaen
Maesteg Celtic	14-37	South Wales Police
Pontypridd	13-3	Swansea
Tenby United	23-14	Narberth
Ystradgynlais	3-26	Neath

== Quarter-finals ==
Home team	Score	Away team
Cardiff	20-13	South Wales Police
Maesteg	35-7	Tenby United
Neath	3-7	Llanelli
Pontypridd	32-10	Newbridge

== Semi-finals ==
Team 1	Score	Team 2	Venue
Cardiff	8-6	Pontypridd	Rodney Parade
Llanelli	23-7	Maesteg	Neath

== Final ==
Team 1	Score	Team 2	Venue
Cardiff	15-8	Llanelli	Cardiff Arms Park
