= Waunarlwydd RFC =

Welsh rugby union club, based in Waunarlwydd

(Wales) Waunarlwydd RFC
- Full name: Waunarlwydd Rugby Football Club
- Nickname: The Rams
- Founded: 1901(c)
- Location: Waunarlwydd, Wales
- Ground: Waunarlwydd Recreation Ground
- Chairman: Andrew Wedlake
- Coach(es): Jonny Lewis, Daniel Joseph
- Captain: Chris Seeley
- League: WRU Division One West
- 2021-22: 7th
Team kit

Official website
- www.waunarlwyddrfc.org.uk

Waunarlwydd Rugby Football Club are a Welsh rugby union club based in the village of Waunarlwydd, Swansea. Waunarlwydd are a member of the Welsh Rugby Union and are a feeder club for the Ospreys.

Formed in 1900 the club celebrated its centenary with a tour to Prague in the Czech Republic.

The club runs teams at all ages between Under 8 and Under 16, a youth section consisting of under 17's and under 19's, seniors, veterans and women's teams. Waunarlwydd currently plays in the WRU Division One West following promotion from WRU Division Two West in the 2009/2010 season. It is the club's second spell in Division One; they originally attained promotion following the 2004/2005 season before being relegated at the end of the 2007/2008 season.

== Club history ==
Waunarlwydd RFC was formed in 1900 and originally played on what is now the Common at Mynydd Bach Y Glo. The team changed at the Arcade, this being the name of the building on the corner of Swansea Road and Bryn Road. There were no club colours and players provided their own jerseys, whatever the colour. In 1908 Waunarlwydd played in a Championship final at St. Helen's. Their opponents were Baycliff, a team from the Sandfields area a match which saw Waunarlwydd have eight players sent off.

The club tasted their first championship success in season 1921-1922 when they won the Third Division Championship of the Swansea & District Rugby Union. In 1933 made its first application for membership of the Welsh Rugby Union. The team won the Swansea and District Rugby Union league and cup double in the 1950/51 season.

In the 1984/85 season the 'green and blacks' reached the West Wales Cup Final following victories against Ystradgynlais, Tumble and Seven Sisters in the preceding rounds. Waunarlwydd RFC met, and lost to, Carmarthen Athletic in the final.

== Past Players ==
Liam San-Jay Williams - Scarlets, Saracens, Cardiff, Wales, B&I Lions. Nicky Smith - Ospreys, Wales. Scott Otten - Ospreys. Matthew Protheroe - Gloucester. England Elite 18, 20'S. Nicky Thomas - Gloucester. Dai Watts - Swansea Rfc. Keelan Giles - Ospreys. David Weatherley - Swansea and Wales

== Current squad ==
Player	Position	Player	Position					
Rhys Flower	Hooker	Joel Matuschke	Scrum half					
Rhys Mango Cherry	Hooker	Morgan Couch	Scrum half/ Wing					
Mike Maddocks	Hooker	Phil Evans	Pack					
Steff Turkish Jones	Flanker	Charlie Smith	Fly Half					
Nick Clous Jones	Fly Half							
Chris Seeley	Prop	Andrew Rees-Spowart	Fly Half/ Center					
Ryan Porter	Prop	Jonny Lewis	Fly Half/ Center	Iwan Norman Second Row/ Flanker	Dan Mush Moyle	Lock/ 8	keiran Lewis	Center
Sam Kirwan	Lock	Rhys Powell	Center					
Dan Joseph	Flanker	Adam Mort	Center					
Daryll Moore	Lock	Tom Wedlake	Center					
Sion Evans	Flanker	Callum Owen						
James Cleary	Flanker	Rhodri Williams	Wing					
Rhys Satts	Wing							
Owain Green	Centre	Will Thomas	Fullback					
