= Tonmawr =

Village in Wales

Coordinates: 51°39′12″N 3°44′00″W

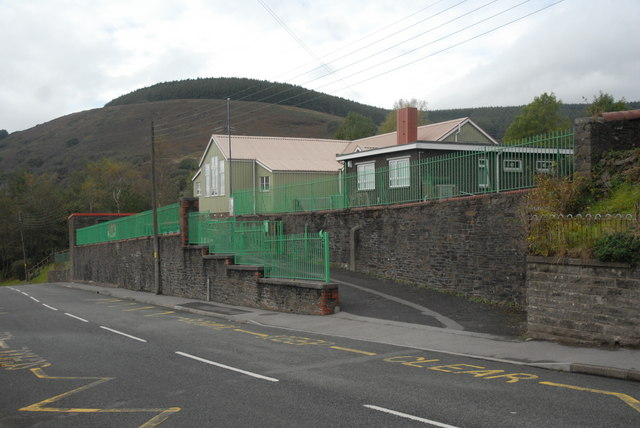
Tonmawr primary school

Tonmawr is a village in Neath Port Talbot county borough, south Wales. It is part of the community of Pelenna and is located around four miles east of Neath.

The village is home to a rugby union team (Tonmawr RFC), a community centre, and the Bryn Bettws Lodge.

The current coach of the Welsh National team, Steve Tandy, was born in Tonmawr.
