= Oswald Griffiths =

Wales international rugby league footballer

Ossie Griffiths
Personal information
- Full name: Oswald Griffiths
- Born: 12 January 1909; Neath Port Talbot, Wales
- Died: December 1989 (aged 80); Neath, Wales

Playing information

Rugby union
Club
Years	Team	Pld	T	G	FG	P
≤1932–32	Cwmavon RFC

Rugby league
- Position: Centre, Second-row, Loose forward
Club
Years	Team	Pld	T	G	FG	P
1932–34	Wigan	57	3			9
1934–35	St. Helens	56	4	0	0	12
1935–38	Halifax	53	0	0	0	0
1938–39	St. Helens	23	2	0	0	6
	Total	189	9	0	0	27
Representative
Years	Team	Pld	T	G	FG	P
1935–36	Wales	4

Oswald Griffiths (12 January 1909 – December 1989) was a Welsh rugby union and professional rugby league footballer who played in the 1930s. He played club level rugby union (RU) for Cwmavon RFC, and representative level rugby league (RL) for Wales, and at club level for Wigan, St. Helens (two spells), and Halifax, as a centre, second-row, or loose forward.

== Playing career ==
=== International honours ===
Ossie Griffiths won 4 caps for Wales (RL) in 1935–1936 while at St. Helens.

=== Championship final appearances ===
Ossie Griffiths played loose forward in Wigan's 15–3 victory over Salford in the Championship Final during the 1933–34 season at Wilderspool Stadium, Warrington on Saturday 28 April 1934.

== Note ==
"The British Rugby League Records Book" states that Ossie Griffiths won his Wales caps while at St. Helens 1935–1936. However, Ossie Griffiths left St. Helens for Halifax on 16 November 1935, and did not resign for St. Helens until 1 February 1938, consequently any cap(s) won after 16 November 1935, and before the end of 1936 would likely have been while at Halifax.
