= Crymych RFC =

- Full name: Crymych Rugby Football Club
- Founded: 1984
- Location: Crymych, Wales
- Ground(s): Parc Lloyd Thomas
- President: Kaye Davies
- Coach(es): Gareth Williams; Robin Davies
- League(s): WRU Division One West
- 2013-14: 3rd
Team kit

Official website
- www.clwbrygbicrymychrfc.co.uk

Crymych Rugby Football Club (Welsh: Clwb Rygbi Crymych) is a rugby union team from the village of Crymych in Pembrokeshire, Wales. The club is a member of the Welsh Rugby Union and is a feeder club for the Llanelli Scarlets.

== History ==
Crymych RFC is, by Welsh rugby union standards, a very young rugby club. Formed in 1984 out of the belief that the number of players leaving the locality, to join neighbouring clubs such as Cardigan, Narberth and Whitland, would be better served by a local team. The first match was played against a Whitlands XV in September 1984, and soon former residents were returning to play for the club. The club was admitted to the Welsh Rugby Union in 1995 and in 2003 a new clubhouse was opened.

== Notable players ==
- Josh Macleod (Wales seniors, 2020)
- Stephen Varney (Italy seniors, 2020)
