= Kuli Faletau =

Tonga international rugby union player

- Born: 30 December 1963 (age 62) Nuku'alofa, Tonga
- Height: 1.97 m (6 ft 5 1/2 in)
- Weight: 252 lb (114 kg)
- Notable relative: Taulupe Faletau (son)

Rugby union career
- Position: Lock
Amateur team(s)
Years	Team	Apps	(Points)
- Toa-ko-ma'afu
–	Tonmawr		
Senior career
Years	Team	Apps	(Points)
1997–00	Ebbw Vale	11	(10)
2001–03	Pontypool	59	(35)
International career
Years	Team	Apps	(Points)
1988–99	Tonga	20	(9)

Kuli Faletau (born 30 December 1963) is a Tongan former international rugby union player who played as a lock. He is Tonga's most capped forward.

== Career ==
Faletau played as a lock, and played in 20 tests for Tonga between 1988 and 1999, scoring 2 tries and 9 points.

He also appeared at the 1999 Rugby World Cup.

Faletau played at club level for Tonmawr, Toa-ko-ma'afu, Ebbw Vale and Pontypool.

== Personal life ==
He is the father of Welsh professional rugby union player Taulupe Faletau. He also has two other sons, and is a lay preacher in Wales.
