= Henry Morgan (rugby union) =

- Full name: Charles Henry Morgan
- Born: 22 December 1932 Carmarthen, Wales
- Died: 22 August 2014 (aged 81) Llanelli, Wales

Rugby union career
- Position: Prop
International career
| Years | Team | Apps | (Points) |
| 1957 | Wales | 2 | (0) |

Charles Henry Morgan (22 December 1932 – 22 August 2014) was a Welsh international rugby union player.

Born in Carmarthen, Morgan was a product of Carmarthen Athletic RFC and also played for Llanelli.

Morgan gained his two Wales caps as a prop for their final two fixtures of the 1957 Five Nations. Wales had lost their previous two matches and Morgan was called up to replace Courtenay Meredith in the front-row. He appeared against Ireland in Cardiff and France in Paris, both as part of winning teams.

== See also ==
- List of Wales national rugby union players
