= David Harris Davies =

Wales international rugby union footballer

David Davies
- Born: David Harris Davies; 27 October 1877 Tonna, Neath, Wales
- Died: 30 September 1944 (aged 66)
- Occupation: police officer

Rugby union career
- Position: Forward
Amateur team(s)
Years	Team	Apps	(Points)
- Tonna RFC
–	Neath RFC		
–	Glamorgan Police RFC		
–	Glamorgan County RFC		
International career
Years	Team	Apps	(Points)
1904	Wales	1	(0)

David Harris Davies (27 October 1877 – 30 September 1944) was a Welsh international rugby union forward who played club rugby for Neath and county rugby for Glamorgan. He won a single international cap, selected to play for Wales in 1904.

== Rugby career ==
Davies was born in Tonna, Neath, and came through the ranks of local team Tonna RFC, before moving to Neath, considered the area's major rugby team. While with Neath, Davies also turned out for Glamorgan police and Glamorgan County. By the 1902/03 season, Davies was a prominent member of the Neath squad and was given the senior team captaincy.

Davies' most notable rugby match was his one and only international cap, being selected to represent Wales as part of the 1904 Home Nations Championship. The opening game of the Championship had resulted in a 14 all draw between England and Wales, and the Welsh selectors responded by bringing in five new caps, four of them forwards. Played against Scotland at Swansea Wales were led out by Willie Llewellyn. The game was a one-sided affair, with the Welsh forwards providing plenty of possession for the Welsh backs to control the play. Despite a heavy Welsh victory, the Welsh selectors made further changes for the next game, with Davies being one of those players dropped from the team.

Jenkins would later become a prominent member in Welsh rugby administration.

=== International matches played ===
Wales

- Scotland 1904

== Bibliography ==
- Jenkins, John M.; et al. (1991). Who's Who of Welsh International Rugby Players. Wrexham: Bridge Books. ISBN 1-872424-10-4.
- Smith, David; Williams, Gareth (1980). Fields of Praise: The Official History of The Welsh Rugby Union. Cardiff: University of Wales Press. ISBN 0-7083-0766-3.
