= Len Blyth =

Welsh rugby union player

- Born: Leonard Grist Blyth; 20 November 1920 Swansea, Wales
- Died: 24 June 1995 (aged 74) Johannesburg, South Africa
- School: Dynevor School

Rugby union career
- Position: Flanker
Amateur team(s)
Years	Team	Apps	(Points)
- Gorseinon RFC
–	Swansea RFC		
International career
Years	Team	Apps	(Points)
1951-1952	Wales	3	(0)

Leonard Grist Blyth (20 November 1920 – 24 June 1995) was a Welsh international rugby union flanker who played club rugby for Swansea. He captained Swansea and played in three international games for Wales which saw him become a Grand Slam winner.

== Rugby career ==
Blyth was captain of Swansea during the 1951/52 season and led his team against the touring South Africans on 15 December 1951. Seven days later, Blyth was awarded his first international cap when he was chosen as a flanker to face the South Africans for the Welsh national team. Wales were narrowly beaten and Blyth found himself selected for the opening game of the 1952 Five Nations Championship. Blyth played against England and Scotland before losing his position for the last two matches. Nevertheless, Wales won the tournament and Blyth became a Grand Slam winner. After the end of his international career, Blyth still played against international opposition, including Swansea's 6–6 draw against the 1953 touring New Zealand side.

=== International matches played ===
Wales

- England 1952
- Scotland 1952
- South Africa 1951

== Bibliography ==
- Smith, David; Williams, Gareth (1980). Fields of Praise: The Official History of The Welsh Rugby Union. Cardiff: University of Wales Press. ISBN 0-7083-0766-3.
