= Lloyd Evans (rugby union, born 1990) =

Welsh rugby union player

- Born: Lloyd Evans; 14 September 1990 (age 36) Bridgend, Wales
- Height: 182 cm (6 ft 0 in)
- Weight: 98 kg (15 st 6 lb)

Rugby union career
- Position: Flanker
- Current team: Ospreys Wales 7s
Senior career
Years	Team	Apps	(Points)
2013-	Ospreys	12	(0)
- Correct as of 21:19, 11 October 2015 (UTC)

Lloyd Evans (born 14 September 1990) is a Welsh rugby union player who plays for Ospreys regional team as a flanker. He has recently signed a central contract with Wales 7s playing on the HSBC World Series.

Evans made his debut for the Ospreys regional team in 2013 having previously played for the Bridgend Athletic and Bridgend Ravens.
