= Tumble RFC =

Welsh rugby union football club

(Wales) Tumble RFC
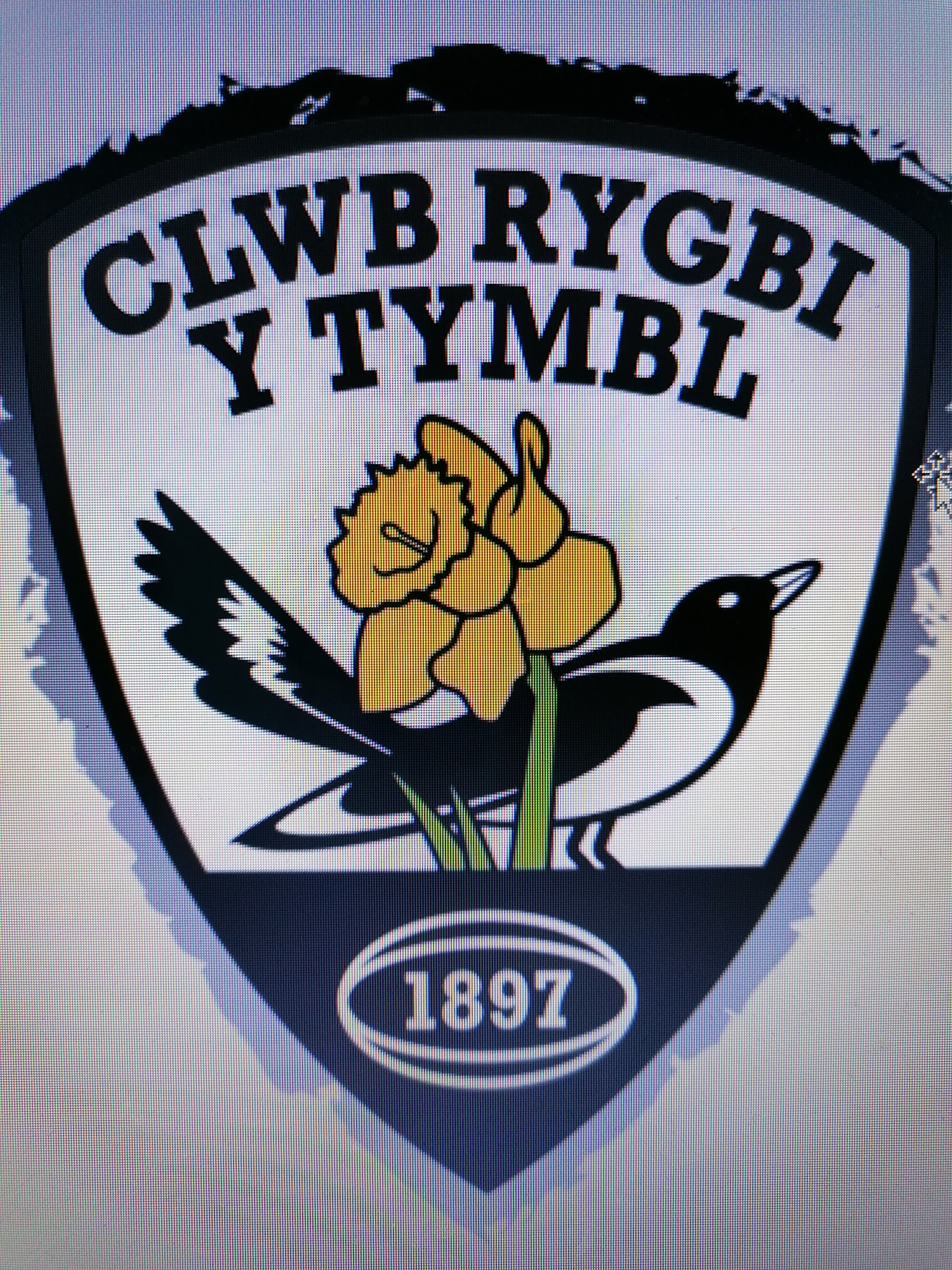
- Full name: Clwb Rygbi Y Tymbl
- Union: Welsh Rugby Union
- Nickname: Magpies / Y Piod
- Founded: 1897
- Location: Tumble, Wales
- Ground: Parc Y Mynydd Mawr (Capacity: 1,000)
- Chairman: Roger Perry
- President: John Williams
- Coach(es): Chris Davies, Nic Cudd, Paul Davies
- Captain: Steffan Price
- League: WRU Division Three West B
- 2015-16: 1st (Division 3 West B)
Team kit

Official website
- tumble.rfc.wales

Tumble RFC or Clwb Rygbi Y Tymbl (Welsh) is a rugby union club representing the village of Tumble, near Llanelli in Carmarthenshire, South Wales. The club is a member of the Welsh Rugby Union and is a feeder club for the Llanelli Scarlets.

== Club history ==
The history of coal mining and rugby union in Tumble is intrinsically linked as it is in many villages and towns across South Wales. Established in 1897 to provide recreational opportunities for workers from the Great Mountain Colliery and other mines and farms in the area Clwb Rygbi Y Tymbl or Tumble RFC are the most successful rugby club from the old West Wales Rugby Union (WWRU). Prior to the establishment of the Great Mountain Colliery in 1887 the village of Tumble was no more than an Inn (from which the settlement took its distinct name) and a few scattered houses and farms. With the rapid growth of the village to provide workers to service the needs of the colliery there was soon a need for a sporting club and so Tumble RFC was born.

Nicknamed the 'Magpies', or 'Y Piod' in Welsh due to their distinctive Black and White hooped jersey the club's peak in terms of success came during the 1980s where they managed the feat of winning the WWRU President's Cup five times, the WWRU Challenge Cup four times and the WWRU Championship three times. The club are the record holders of the WWRU Challenge Cup - 12 wins, WWRU President's Cup - 8 wins and joint record winners (along with Seven Sisters RFC) of the WWRU League Championship - 5 wins.

Whilst the Black and White hooped jersey is synonymous with the club it is a little known fact that the original club colours were Blue and Gold quarters and it was this strip that was worn in the first game back in 1897 when the team walked the 2 miles to near neighbours Pontyberem RFC and defeated the hosts by a try to nil. In the early years the club colours changed to all Black with White Star (earning the club the nickname 'The Starlights'), Gold and Green vertical stripes, all White, before finally adopting the famous Black and White hoops in 1920/21, which earned the club the nickname of 'The Magpies'.

After a period of a few months where a group of miners, led by Orphie Evans and his brother George had been practicing and encouraging others to participate in the game of rugby union it was decided to form a club at a meeting held at Bryn Stores reading room in 1897. The club played its early home games at the Hotel fields which were across the road from the Tumble Hotel and roughly where the Pharmacy, Bethel Chapel and Tumble Hall now stand on Heol y Neuadd. Trees sawn down in a woodland in Upper Tumble, where the Mynydd Mawr Isolation Hospital was later constructed were used to make the goal posts for the Hotel fields.

Orphie Evans was given the distinction of being elected the club's first captain with Mr. Morgan Howells (chairman), Mr. Hamilton (secretary) and Mr. McNeile (treasurer) making up the club's original committee. The first team to take the field away against Pontyberem in 1897 was as follows:

Fullback - Tom James Threequarters - Orphie Evans (captain), Harry Rees, Wat Wiliams, Davies Jones Half backs - Arthur Jones, Moses Rees Forwards - George Evans, P.C. Britten, Tom Howells, Rees Bowen, Dai Howells, Joe Hill, Arthur Watson Welburn, D.J. Davies The winning try was scored by Watson Welburn.

Over the first 50 years the club moved headquarters and playing fields several times - with games also being played on Bethesda Road (near the chapel vestry), fields owned by Ty-Isha farm, a field near Ty-Rhos farm, the Hirwaun field off Blaenhirwaun Lane. In 1912/13 the club moved to Lletty Field above Ty-Isha Road. Originally rented, fund-raising efforts by committee members John Tierney and David Lewis, enabled the club to buy the pitch along with further land alongside it. Lletty Field was to remain the club's home until the 1936/37 season. Tir Becca housing estate now sits on the site of Lletty Field. In the 1921/22 season the club celebrated its first 25 years by being granted admission as a full member of the Welsh Rugby Union.

In the 1936/37 season the club moved to the newly constructed Welfare Park, later renamed Parc y Mynydd Mawr and have remained there ever since. The Welfare Park was developed to provide recreational opportunities for the expanding village and as well as a new rugby field included a cricket field, bowling green, children's play area and a wooden pavilion. A new pavilion was erected in 1939 before being replaced by the existing changing rooms in 1983.

The 1930s was a great decade for the club where they were the first winners of the newly created WWRU Challenge Cup in 1933, successfully defending the trophy for a further two seasons before being crowned WWRU league Champions for the first time in season 1937/38. Play was suspended in 1939 at the advent of the Second World War but rugby in the village was kept going by the 'Pigstye Rovers', a local ex-schoolboy club. Thanks to the efforts of the Pigstyes the senior club was quickly re-established and in season 1945/46 the club won its first post war trophy when it picked up the Challenge Cup for the fourth time. The final at Stradey Park against Amman United RFC drew a crowd of over 10,000 spectators. In this era scouts from rugby league in the north of England were common place at WWRU games and a number of Tumble RFC turned 'professional' and went north. Three players from the 1945–46 cup-winning side turned professional including centre Lynn Walters and full back Mel Tierney.

Tumble successfully defended the Challenge Cup in 1946/47 season, its Golden Jubilee. The first 50 years of the club were celebrated on March 12, 1947 when a Cardiff RFC side containing five full Welsh international players, including the great Bleddyn Williams at centre played the Magpies at the Welfare Park. The first half was kicked off by Archie Skym the former Tumble, Cardiff and Wales prop whilst the second half was started by Orphie Evans, the club's first ever captain from 1897. The WWRU league Championship was again secured in season 1949/50 before silverware became more elusive to obtain.

During the next three decades the club's success waned a little with the Magpies only winning the Challenge Cup twice, in seasons 1962/63 and 1971/72, when they defeated Penclawdd RFC at Stradey Park in the final before also claiming the President's Cup. During the 1970s, mostly under the captaincy of goalkicking front-rower Brian Jones there were also Challenge Cup final defeats to Kidwelly RFC (1973) and Seven Sisters RFC (1975) as well as wins in the WWRU Cup 1974/75, 1975/76 and the Eurof Davies Memorial Cup 1974/75.

In January 1977 the club played out an epic 12–12 draw at home to the mighty Newport RFC in the Welsh Cup. The Black and Ambers proceeded into the next round having scored the 'away' try. Referee Meirion Joseph was the centre of controversy when he ruled out a Steve Lewis penalty attempt which went high over the posts despite both linesmen having signaled a successful attempt. Newport would go on to win the Welsh Cup that season.

Up to this point the club had changed headquarters on a number of occasions, including the Old Reading Room behind High Street, a shed alongside Morawel, a room at the Lodging House, Ma Perkins Sweet Shop at 95 High Street and the Tumble Hotel before in 1964 the decision was made to amalgamate Tumble RFC with the Great Mountain Workingmen's Club. The amalgamation of both clubs created the Great Mountain and Tumble Rugby Football Club which was official opened by Col. W. Kemmis Buckley of Buckley's Brewery on 20 September 1966. A large new function / concert room was added to the rear of the building replacing the old long skittle alley.

The 1980s can be seen as the Golden Era for the club when the Magpies, under the coaching of John 'Coch' Williams and then the John brothers, Clive and Alan (brothers of Barry and former Llanelli RFC players) became the dominant force in West Wales rugby. In season 1981/82 the club won the WWRU Section B championship to gain promotion back to Section A under the captaincy of the great Number 8 Peris Williams. This was to be the start of a great era for the club with a number of outstanding players turning out in the Black and White hoops. Along with captain Williams there were many other club legends playing in this era including scrum half Arwel Davies (who would go on to captain the club for seven seasons), back rowers Gareth Davies and Robert 'Tonto' Roberts and full back Wynford Lewis, who had returned to the village from Aberavon RFC.

The club faced Cardiff RFC, captained by former Magpie Gareth Davies on 28 March 1983 to raise money for young Huw Jones who had been seriously injured whilst playing for the Youth team. The Blue and Blacks brought a star-studded team to Parc y Mynydd Mawr, including Welsh Internationals Davies, Terry Holmes, Bob Norster and Alan Phillips.

In 1983/84 Tumble were crowned WWRU Champions for the first time in 34 years, a title they reclaimed the following year, along with the WWRU Challenge Cup. They held onto the cup for a further four years and in 1987/88 they won the WWRU Championship for the last time before the nationalisation of the league system. 1987/88 season was somewhat of a pinnacle for the club where under the captaincy of scrum half Arwel Davies the 1st, 2nd and Youth XVs had the distinction of winning every competition they were entered in, the fabled 'Grand Slam' season.

1988/89 season saw the Magpies win their last trophy of the illustrious 1980s when they defeated Felinfoel RFC 23–13 at Stradey Park in the WWRU Challenge Cup - their fourth cup win in four seasons. This was another great Magpies team containing players such as Arwel Davies, Peris Williams, Gareth Davies, Wayne Price, Errol Price, Wayne Richards and Mark Lewis.

The club remain the most successful WWRU club with a record 12 wins in the Challenge (Tovali) Cup and 8 wins in the President's Cup. The Magpies are joint record West Wales Championship winners with Seven Sisters RFC on 5 wins each.

In 1990 Tumble gained WRU Heineken National League status and with that departed the Great Mountain Workingmen's Club to take up residency in the former Tumble Hotel which became the new clubhouse.

In 1991/92 the club won the WRU Heineken National League Division 4 Championship under the captaincy of scrum half Arwel Davies in his last season as a player with Tumble RFC before moving to Cefneithin RFC as player-coach. What followed was a period of transition as the club lost many of its senior players from the 1980s and had to rebuild with a new crop of promising young players.

In 1995/96 Arwel Davies, Peris Williams and Gareth Davies all returned to the club as a new coaching team. An outstanding young team was put together under the captaincy of centre Richard Hardy and saw the Magpies reclaim the WWRU Challenge Cup for the twelfth time, beating Felinfoel RFC 33–17 at Stradey Park. The club also narrowly lost out on the WRU Heineken League Division 4 title to Merthyr RFC on bonus points, despite having won more games (18) and having beaten Ironmen home and away.

The IRB made the game of rugby union 'open' to professionalism in 1995 and it was at the time of its centenary season in 1996/97 that the club began to struggle. Not being able to compete financially against clubs from towns and those with backers able to pay players to play there was a serious downturn in fortunes and it was only due to the number of players being produced by its junior and youth sections that the club survived. A number of outstanding players continued to come through the system at the club but it provided increasingly difficult to keep hold of these players long enough to be able to build a side capable of challenging for league titles. Prop Alan King was club captain for many of these seasons, being skipper for five consecutive seasons from 1998/99 to 2002/03. Following spells at Carmarthen Quins RFC and Kidwelly RFC (who he also captained) King would return to the club and captain the Magpies for a further four seasons (2009/10 to 2012/13), making it nine seasons in total and breaking the record previously held by the great Arwel Davies (seven seasons).

In season 2006/07 after a number of struggles and false dawns the club won the WRU Division 3 West Championship and the WWRU Brains SA Bowl under the coaching team of player-coaches James Jones, Paul Davies and former Swansea RFC and Wales wing Richard Rees, who had returned to finish his career at the club where it all started. Number 8 Derek Lewis, who had recently returned to the club from Llangennech RFC was installed as club captain. The WWRU Bowl was secured with a win against a Mumbles RFC at Dunvant RFC.

Promotion to Division 2 West came at a cost and with a number of retirements from senior players the club again struggled and suffered successive relegations in seasons 2007/08 and 2008/09. Season 2009/10 saw the return of club legends Arwel and Gareth Davies to the club as senior coaches after over 12 years away coaching to great success at clubs such as Llangennech RFC. Scrum half Chris Davies also returned to the club having captained Llangennech RFC for a number of seasons. An outstanding season saw the Magpies clinch the WRU Division 4 West championship as well as adding the WWRU Brains SA Plate to the trophy cabinet (beating Cwmgwrach RFC at Dunvant in the final). This win ensured that Tumble RFC had the distinction of becoming the first club to win the 'treble' of WWRU Cup, Bowl and Plate.

It was in 2010 that the club moved its headquarters back to the Great Mountain Workingmen's Club after 20 years at the former Tumble Hotel which was earmarked for closure.

Further trophies followed when the club won the Brians SA Bowl for the second time in season 2011/12, defeating Seven Sisters 27–26 at Loughor RFC (the game was rearranged as the original fixture at Dunvant RFC had been postponed due to a waterlogged pitch) under the captaincy of prop Alan King and the coaching of Gareth Davies and Chris Davies, who had replaced his father Arwel as backs coach.

Season 2013/14 saw the disappointment of a bottom place finish and subsequent relegation. The appointment of Marc Kinnaird and Hugh Gustafson to assist Chris Davies in a new coaching unit saw the club recover to secure a fourth-place finish in Division 3 West A for 2014/15.

Season 2015/16 will do down as another successful one in the history of the club with the 1st XV clinching the Division 3 West B championship by a point from second placed Lampeter Town RFC in the last fixture of the season. The Magpies defeated Aberaeron RFC away whilst title contenders Burry Port RFC lost and Lampeter Town RFC could not make-up enough points from their remaining fixtures. The Magpies finished the season with a playing record of played 20, won 16, drawn 1, lost 3 - points 79.

Another season of transition followed in 2018/19 with relegation back to Division 3 West B. At the point of the 2019/20 season being canceled due to the COVID-19 global pandemic the Magpies had been joint top of Division 3 West B (along with Amman United RFC) and had also found themselves one game off a Principality Stadium final in the semi-final of the Specsavers National Bowl against Abertysswg RFC. Captain for the 2019/20 season had been young centre Steffan Price who has strong family ties with the club being the son of former captain Errol Price, grandson of former chairman Roy Price and nephew of another great Magpie Wayne Price.

The club currently run a full complement of junior sides from under 7's to under 16's and a Youth team (under 19's).

In 2016 the club reformed its women's team which were duly nicknamed 'Y Piod Pinc' - 'the Pink Magpies' under the captaincy of Tina Thomas. The club had originally run a women's team for three seasons from 1992/93 under captain Ann Marie Walters before it was disbanded. The women's section within the club is slowly establishing itself and a girls junior side 'Y Pinc Bach' were added in 2019. The club had established its own girls rugby hub called 'Merched Mynydd Mawr' in 2020 which was to operate out of Ysgol Maes y Gwendraeth and act as a development pathway for girls rugby in the area. Unfortunately, the COVID-19 pandemic has led to its postponement.

== Club badge ==
There have been a number of club badges for the club over the years starting with a White Star on a black jersey when the club were known as 'the Starlights' back in 1900. With the adoption of the Black and White hoops in 1920/21 the club soon became known as the Magpies the club badge by the 1930s was however a simple shield with the letters TRFC overlaid - similar to the badge of the Barbarians FC.

Over the years the traditional Magpies badge evolved and had a Daffodil added to represent Wales. There have been many variants to the Magpies badge over the years. By the 1980s the Magpie and Daffodil badge was added to the club jerseys, first with the words Tumble R.F.C. and then by the end of the decade Clwb Rygbi Y Tymbl.

The club badge was further altered in 2012 with the creation of a new shield. Again containing the familiar Magpie and Daffodil 1897 was added to represent the year in which the club was established. In 2015 a club motto 'Ymlaen Y Piod' or 'Forward the Magpies' was added to the club shield, as well as the words 'Parc y Mynydd Mawr'.

== International players ==
Over the years the club has produced many players who have gained representative honours for Wales at Youth and Schools level, names include Errol Price, Dorian Jones, James Jones, Mark Bowen, Callum Williams, John Williams, Owen Gustafson, Michael Jones, Andrew Jones, Rhodri Jones, Rhys Jones, Kevin Jones, Mathew Geally, Morton Howells, Craig Evans, Simon Lewis and Andrew McPherson.

One of Tumble's most notable players, was Welsh international prop Archie Skym. Although Skym had already moved to Llanelli RFC by the time he was first capped, he came to the attention of larger clubs when representing Tumble. He joined the team from a local side at Drefach, and in December 1926 left Tumble for the Scarlets. Nicknamed 'The Butcher' Skym earned 20 caps for Wales and also went on to play over 200 games for Cardiff RFC, who he also captained.

Wing Peter Rees represented Penygroes RFC and Tumble RFC before moving to Llanelli RFC in 1945. Rees earned 2 caps in the 1946/47 Five Nations championship against France and Ireland. Finishing his first class career at 25 years of age, Rees returned to Tumble and captained the Magpies in season 1952/53 before finishing at home village club Penygroes RFC. Rees later served as both chairman and president of Llanelli RFC. Peter was the oldest surviving Welsh international before he died in August 2020 at the age of 95.

Fly-half Handel Greville was born in Drefach and followed his father in playing for the Magpies before moving to Llanelli RFC, who he captained in the 1948/49 season. Greville was selected for his only international cap against the touring Australians in 1947 when the normally reliable Haydn Tanner was unavailable through injury. Wales won the game 6–0 with Greville giving an international-class performance but lost his place when Tanner was deemed fit for the next game. Like Peter Rees after finishing his playing career, Greville became Chairman and President of Llanelli RFC.

Former Tumble RFC player Des Jones also gained a cap in 1948 whilst playing at Llanelli RFC whilst D. Ken Jones tuned out for the club before having a successful career with Llanelli, Cardiff and Wales in the 1960s.

Gareth Davies (rugby union, born 1955) the former Cardiff, Wales and British Lions outside half of the late 70's early 80's and former Welsh Rugby Union chairman was born in Tumble and represented the club before moving into the first class game, briefly with Llanelli RFC before switching to the Arms Park. Davies would later become a successful administrator acting as chief executive of Cardiff RFC in the 1990s before returning to the game in the same role with the Dragons in 2012. In 2014 Davies was elected as chairman of the Welsh Rugby Union, a role he carried out for two terms finishing in 2020.

One of the leading lights of Tumble's 1980's domination of West Wales rugby was full back Wynford Lewis. Before returning to his home village club in the early 1980s Wynford had enjoyed a successful first-class career with Aberavon RFC from where he gained a Wales B cap in 1980. Despite his consistent form Lewis has the misfortune of playing in the same position as the great JPR Williams otherwise he would have likely won a full Welsh Cap. Following his playing career Lewis coached the club's successful Youth team for many seasons during the 1990s.

Another notable former player is Richard Rees the former Neath, Newport, Swansea, Scarlets and Wales wing. After graduating from the Youth team Rees quickly established himself as a powerful and quick winger with the first team before moving to Neath and then Newport. Rees had a long and distinguished career with Swansea RFC from where he gained his only Welsh cap against Zimbabwae in 1998. Rees returned to Tumble RFC to finish his career as player/coach in 2006.

Dwayne Peel, the former Scarlets, Sale Sharks, Bristol, Wales and British Lions scrum-half, who is now head coach of the Scarlets, is the son of former Magpie Dennis Peel and came through the club's junior system before moving to Llanelli RFC. Before being overtaken by Mike Phillips, Peel was Wales' most capped scrum-half on 76 caps.

Daniel Evans the Ospreys fullback full back played for the Magpies at Under 15, Under 16 and Youth level before moving to the Scarlets. It was whilst at Parc y Scarlets that Evans gained two caps for Wales on the 2009 tour to North America, making his debut against Canada on 30 May 2009. Having left the Scarlets Evans moved to the Dragons and then the Ospreys. Despite some great regional form at the Liberty Stadium a third Welsh cap has so far eluded Evans.

Bath's Darren Allinson formally of the Cardiff Blues, Nicholas Cudd formally of the Scarlets and Newport Gwent Dragons and Hugh Gustafson formally of the Dragons have all represented the club at junior and /or youth level. Both Gustafson and Cudd have been successful coaches within the club.

Former Wales Under 20 outside half and Wales 7s international Billy McBryde played for the club's junior section before moving to Llanelli RFC and the Scarlets Academy while his father Robin (Leinster and former Wales forwards coach) is a club vice-president. Gareth Williams, a former club junior section player is the Wales Under 20's head coach as has previously held the Wales 7's head coach position and was assistant coach for the Team GB Rugby 7's squad at the Rio Olympics. Williams is the son of club legend Peris Williams and was himself capped by Wales at Under 16, Under 18, Under 19, Under 21 and 7's level.

Young Scarlets wing Tom Rogers, who hails from Cross Hands played youth rugby for the club and made a 1st team appearance against Fishguard and Goodwick RFC in April 2017 before switching to Parc y Scarlets. Tom has been capped for Wales at Under 20, 7s and on 2 July 2021 made his debut for the Welsh national side in a 68-12 victory over Canada Rugby at the Principality Stadium. The appearance against Canada saw Rogers become the 11th former Tumble RFC player to gain a full Welsh cap.

Full Welsh Internationals:

- (Wales) Archie Skym - 20 caps (1928–35)
- (Wales) Peter Rees - 2 caps (1947)
- (Wales) Handel Greville - 1 cap (1947)
- (Wales) Des Jones - 1 cap (1947)
- (Wales) D. Ken Jones - 14 caps (1962–66)
- (Wales) Gareth Davies - 21 caps (1978–85)
- (Wales) Richard Rees - 1 cap (1998)
- (Wales) Robin McBryde - 37 caps (1994-2005)
- (Wales) Dwayne Peel - 76 caps (2001-2011)
- (Wales) Dan Evans (rugby union) - 2 caps (2009)
- (Wales) Tom Rogers (rugby union) - 2 caps (2021- )

British and Irish Lions: Four players with close links to Tumble RFC have represented the British & Irish Lions - D. Ken Jones - 1962, 1966 (6 caps) Gareth Davies - 1980 (1 cap) Robin McBryde - 2001 Dwayne Peel - 2005 (3 caps)

== Club honours ==
- West Wales Champions

1937/38 1949/50 1983/84 1984/85 1987/88

- WWRU Section A Champions

1983/84 1984/85 1985/86 1987/88

- WWRU Section B Champions

1981/82

- Presidents Cup Winners

1949/50 1962/63 1971/72 1983/84 1984/85 1985/86 1986/87 1987/88

- Challenge Cup Winners

1933/34 1934/35 1935/36 1945/46 1946/47 1962/63 1971/72 1985/86 1986/87 1987/88 1988/89 1995/96

- The Eurof Davies Memorial Cup Winners

1974/75

- WWRU Cup

1974/75 1975/76

- WRU Heineken League Division Four Champions

1991/92

- WRU ASDA Division Three West Champions

2006/07

- WRU SWALEC Division Four West Champions

2009/10

- WRU SWALEC Division 3 West B Champions

2015/16

- WWRU Brains SA Bowl

2006/07

- WWRU Brains SA Plate

2009/10

- Gijon Sevens Winners

2006/07, 2007/08
