= Wayne Hall (rugby union) =

- Full name: Wayne Hopkin Hall
- Born: 29 January 1958 (age 68) Pencoed, Wales

Rugby union career
- Position: Hooker
International career
Years	Team	Apps	(Points)
1988	Wales	1	(0)

Wayne Hopkin Hall (born 29 January 1958) is a Welsh former rugby union international.

Hall was raised in town of Pencoed and attended Pencoed Comprehensive School.

The first Pencoed RFC produced player to be capped for Wales, Hall made his debut against Western Samoa as a 30-year old in 1988, by which time he was a veteran hooker with Bridgend. This remained his only Wales cap.

Hall is the father of professional golfer Lydia Hall.

== See also ==
- List of Wales national rugby union players
