= Mark Douglas (rugby union) =

Welsh former rugby union player

- Full name: Mark Henry James Douglas
- Born: 10 December 1960 (age 65) Aberystwyth, Wales

Rugby union career
- Position: Scrum-half
International career
Years	Team	Apps	(Points)
1984	Wales	3	(0)

Mark Henry James Douglas (born 10 December 1960) is a Welsh former rugby union international.

Born in Aberystwyth, Douglas was a scrum-half for Llanelli and London Welsh during the 1980s.

Douglas was capped three times for Wales in the 1984 Five Nations Championship, filling in for injured scrum-half Terry Holmes. On his debut against Scotland, he fumbled a likely try in the last play of the game which would have given Wales a kick to win. He also faced off with Ireland and France, before Holmes returned for the final fixture.

In the 1990s, Douglas played for English clubs Northampton and Coventry

Douglas was still competing in first-class rugby into his 40s with his local club Lampeter Town. He comes from the village of Cwmann near Lampeter and runs an abattoir business there with his brothers

== See also ==
- List of Wales national rugby union players
