= Ammanford RFC =

Welsh rugby union club in Carmarthenshire

(Wales) Ammanford RFC
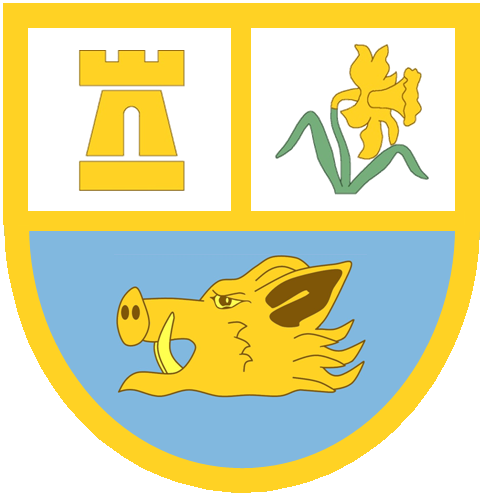
- Full name: Ammanford Rugby Football Club
- Founded: 1887
- Location: Ammanford, Wales
- President: Huw Jones
- Coach: Gareth Potter
- League: WRU Division One West
- 2013-14: 12th
Team kit

Official website
- ammanfordrfc.mywru.co.uk

Ammanford Rugby Football Club is a rugby union team from the town of Ammanford, West Wales. The club is a member of the Welsh Rugby Union and is a feeder club for the Llanelli Scarlets.

== History ==
Ammanford RFC's first officially recorded rugby match came in 1887 against a team from Mynyddbach, Swansea. The game was played at Ynys field opposite the River Amman and their initial clubhouse was the Cross Inn Hotel at Ammanford Square. Ammanford's first official strip colours were amber and black, then switching colours twice before the club settled on black and blue in 1912.

In 1889, Ammanford RFC produced their first international player in Percy Lloyd. Lloyd played four international matches between 1889 and 1890 for Wales, against Scotland, Ireland and England twice. During the 1895–96 season Ammanford RFC successfully gained membership to the Welsh Rugby Union.

== Club honours ==
- 2007-08 WRU Division Three West - Champions
- 2007-08 WRU West Wales Bowl Winners
- 2008-09 SWALEC Plate - Winners
- 2010-11 SWALEC Plate - Winners

== Notable former players ==
See also Category:Ammanford RFC players

The following list contains players who have represented Ammanford RFC and have also been capped at an international level in rugby.

- (Wales) Cyril H. Davies (7 caps, 1957–61)
- (Wales) Daniel Evans (2 caps, 2009)
- (Wales) Jack Evans (3 caps, 1896–97)
- (Wales) Tom Evans (18 caps, 1906–11)
- (Wales) Ike Fowler (1 cap, 1919)
- (Wales) Thomas Hollingdale (6 caps, 1927–30)
- (Wales) Samson Lee (3 caps, 2013-)
- (Wales) Percy Lloyd (4 caps, 1890–91)
- (Wales) Hugh Lloyd-Davies
- (Wales) Joe Rees (12 caps, 1920–24)
- (Wales) Donald Tarr (1 cap, 1935)
- (Wales) Ted Ward (13 RL caps, 1946–51)
