= Pencoed RFC =

Welsh rugby union club, based in Pencoed

(Wales) Pencoed RFC
- Full name: Pencoed Rugby Football Club
- Founded: 1888; 138 years ago
- Location: Pencoed, Wales
- Ground: The Verlands
- Coach(es): Marc Davies, Sean Donovan
- League: WRU Division Three South West
- 2011–12: 5th
Team kit

Official website
- www.pencoedrfc.co.uk

Pencoed Rugby Football Club is a Welsh rugby union team based in Pencoed. Today, Pencoed RFC plays in the Welsh Rugby Union, Division Two West League and is a feeder club for the Ospreys.

The team badge consists of a shield containing the lamb of god carrying a St George's standard. The shield is topped by the Prince of Wales three feathers.

Pencoed RFC was established in 1888 with the clubhouse situated on the eastern edge of Felindre Rd. In 1980 the Mini & Junior section was formed. Pencoed RFC takes pride in being the home club of Welsh internationals Gareth Thomas, Gareth Cooper, and Gavin Henson plus recently retired three times British Lion Scott Gibbs, all of whom progressed through the junior and youth teams to perform with distinction on the world stage.

== International honours ==
- (Wales) Gareth Thomas
- (Wales) Gareth Cooper
- (Wales) Gavin Henson
- (Wales) Scott Gibbs
- (Wales) Wayne Hall
- (Wales) Gareth Jones
- (Wales) Nathan Thomas
- (Wales) Gareth Williams
- (Wales) Adrian Davies
- (Wales) James Bater
- (Wales) Hugh Williams-Jones
- (Wales) Tommy Reffell
- (Wales) Sam Costelow

== British and Irish Lions ==
- Gareth Thomas
- Gavin Henson
- Scott Gibbs
- Gareth Cooper

== Current squad ==
- Kieron Moore
- Jack Jones (C)
- Christian Powell
- Nicky Hawkins
- Andrew Shillam
- James Murphy
- Chris Howells
- Paul McFarlane
- Justin Russell
- Aaron Halse
- Thomas Burke
- Gareth Prentice
- David Pearson
- Liam Evans
- Tom Davies
- Ben Read
- Marc Davies
- Geoff Hobbs
- Stein Jones
- Glenn Hiscocks
- Aaron Songhurst
- Liam Evans
- Ken Morris (Capt.)
- Tom Cross
- Paul Richards
- Tom Drew
- Robert Spear
- Jamie Williams
- Ywain Shakespeare
- Liam Halse
- Anthony Morris
- Mike Rowe
- Rhys Davey
- Gary Money
- Ashley Halse

== Club honours ==
- WRU Division Three South East Champions 2006–07
