= Builth Wells RFC =

Welsh rugby union club, based in Builth Wells

(Wales) Builth Wells RFC
- Full name: Builth Wells Rugby Football Club
- Union: Welsh Rugby Union
- Nickname: The Bulls
- Founded: 1888; 138 years ago
- Location: Builth Wells, Wales
- Ground: The Groe
- President: Mike Price
- Coach(es): Ben Duggan & Lex Botha
- League: WRU Division One West
- 2012–13: 1st WRU Division Two West
Team kit

Official website
- www.builthrugby.co.uk

Builth Wells Rugby Football Club is a Welsh rugby union team based in Builth Wells. Today, Builth Wells RFC play in the Welsh Rugby Union, Division One West Central League. Builth Wells RFC are a feeder club for Cardiff Blues.

The club badge shows a bull charging beneath a rugby post. Builth is thought to be a corruption of Llanfair Ym Muallt (buallt), meaning the Church of St. Mary in the Cow Pasture. The original bull was white.

== Past honours ==
- 2012–13 WRU Division Two West - Champions
- 2008–09 WRU Division Two West - Promoted Runners-up
- 2003–04 WRU Division Two East - Champions

== Notable former players ==
The following players have represented Builth Wells and have been capped at international level.

- (Wales) Jeremy Pugh
- (Wales) Mark Jones
