= Gorseinon RFC =

Welsh rugby union club, based in Gorseinon

(Wales) Gorseinon RFC
- Full name: Gorseinon Rugby Football Club
- Founded: 1883; 143 years ago
- Location: Gorseinon, Wales
- Ground: Welfare Ground (Capacity: 1200)
- Coach: Darren Wilcox
- League: WRU Division One West
Team kit

Official website
- gorseinon.rfc.wales

Gorseinon RFC is a Welsh rugby union club representing the town of Gorseinon, Swansea, South Wales. Gorseinon RFC is a member of the Welsh Rugby Union and is a feeder club for the Ospreys.

== History ==
Gorseinon RFC were formed in 1883 and they were successful in their application to the Welsh Rugby Union in 1895.

Up until World War I they played on the Welfare Ground then called Kings Holme sharing the field with both cricket and football teams. At the outbreak of the 1914–18 war the team was disbanded.

After the World War the club reformed, but under a new name and with a new playing field. The club played under the name of St Catherine's Church in the lower part of Gorseinon, at the rear of Whittington Terrace. The ground was called Pencefnarda and the changing rooms were at the back of the 'Institute'.

Between 1918 and 1931 the ground was redeveloped by the owners of the local works Messrs. Lewis and sons. In 1931 the club started playing under the name of 'Grovesend Welfare'. Although reformed in 1931 under the works name it was not until 1936 that they were re-admitted into the Welsh Rugby Union. In the early 1950s an application was made to change the name back to Gorseinon and its original title.

== Notable former players ==
See also Category:Gorseinon RFC players

- (Wales) Len Blyth (3 caps)
- (Wales) Onllwyn Brace (9 caps)
- (Wales) Tom Day (13 caps)
- (Wales) Norman Gale ( 25 caps )
- (Wales) Lewis Jones (13 caps)
- (Wales) Leigh Halfpenny ( 100 caps )
- (Wales) Dan Biggar ( 112caps )
- (Wales) Eli Walker ( 1 Caps )
- (Wales) Ross Moriarty (54 Caps )
- (Wales) Keelan Giles ( 1 Cap)
