= Aberystwyth RFC =

Welsh rugby union team

(Wales) Aberystwyth RFC
- Full name: Aberystwyth Rugby Football Club
- Union: Welsh Rugby Union
- Founded: 1947
- Location: Aberystwyth, Wales
- Ground(s): Plascrug, SY23 1HL
- Chairman: Emlyn Jones
- President: Raymond Evans
- Coach(es): Iestyn Thomas and Ifan Thomas
- Captain(s): Lee Evans and Charles Thomas
- League: WRU Championship West
- 2024-25: 1st
1st kit	2nd kit

Official website
- aberystwyth.rfc.wales

Aberystwyth Rugby Football Club is a rugby union team from the town of Aberystwyth, West Wales. The club is a member of the Welsh Rugby Union and a feeder club for the Scarlets regional side.

Rugby had been played in Aberystwyth since the late 19th century when the local college founded a rugby team. Aberystwyth Rugby Club was founded in 1947 and the first game was against an Aberystwyth College second team. The club gained membership of the Welsh Rugby Union in May, 1954 which allowed future competitive matches. The team's clubhouse was founded with help of a ten-year interest-free loan from the WRU in 1960. This original clubhouse burned down and was reconstructed in the 1970s.

== Teams ==
The club has 500 members, including adults and children. They have two adult teams, one women's team, one youth team, teams for children up to age 16 as well as a girls hub for ages U8 to U16.

The first team plays in Championship West of the Welsh Rugby Union.

== Bibliography ==
- Smith, David; Williams, Gareth (1980). Fields of Praise, The Official History of the Welsh Rugby Union 1881–1981. ISBN 0-7083-0766-3.
