= Tonmawr RFC =

Welsh rugby union club, based in Tonmawr

(Wales) Tonmawr RFC
- Full name: Tonmawr Rugby Football Club
- Nickname(s): The Pitmen, The Green & Whites, Ton.
- Founded: 1897
- Location: Tonmawr, Neath Port Talbot, Wales
- Ground: The Whitworth (Capacity: 2,000)
- Chairman: Christopher Evans
- Coach: Stef Andrews
- League: WRU Division Three West central A
- 2018-19: 1st
Team kit

Official website
- www.tonmawrrfc.co.uk

Tonmawr are a Welsh rugby union club based in Tonmawr, Neath Port Talbot in South Wales. Tonmawr are a feeder club to the Ospreys regional team. Tonmawr have a tradition of producing players who go onto represent the Ospreys region - these players include current Wales head coach Steve Tandy, winger Kristian Phillips, Wales international centre Ashley Beck and Wales 7's International Stef Andrews.

== Notable former players ==
- Steve Tandy
- Juan Pablo Socino
- Kristian Phillips
- Ashley Beck
- Taulupe Faletau
- Kuli Faletau
- Tal Selley
- Gomer Hughes
- Rees Stephens
- Taunaholo Taufahema

== Club honours ==
- WRU Division three West central B Champions - 2017/18
- WRU Division One West Champions - 2007/08, 2009/10
- WRU Division Six West Champions - 2012/13
- Glamorgan County Silver Ball Trophy Winners - 2006/07, 2007/08
- Aberavon Green Stars - Richard Barry Invitation Sevens Winners - 2008/09, 2009/10
- Benidorm International Invitation Sevens Winners - 2008/09
- Glamorgan County Presidents Cup Winners - 2007/08
- Neath Port Talbot Sports Council ‘Team of the Year’ - 2007
- WRU Division Two West Champions - 2003/04, 2006/07
- O.G. Davies Cup Winners - 1998/99
- O.G. Davies Cup Sevens Winners - 1993/94
- Glamorgan County Silver Ball Trophy Finalists - 1992/93
- Wistech Central Glamorgan League Division 1 Champions - 1993/94
- Promoted to Heineken Division 5 - 1993/94
- Wistech Central Glamorgan League Division 2 Champions - 1992/93
- Wistech Central Glamorgan League Division 3 Champions - 1987/88
- Admission into the Welsh Rugby Union - 1986/87
- Welsh Brewers Cup Winners - 1985/86
- Aberavon District Ushers League Table Champions 1984/85
- Aberavon District Cup Winners 1981/82
- Aberavon District Ushers League Division Champions 1981/82, 1982/83
- Aberavon District Ushers Merit Table Champions 1981/82, 1983/84
- Aberavon District Pat Lahive Memorial Winners 1974/75, 1983/84
- Aberavon District Burton Cup Winners 1952/53, 1958/59
- Aberavon District Hospital Cup Winners 1937/38
