= Cwmavon RFC =

(Wales) Cwmavon RFC
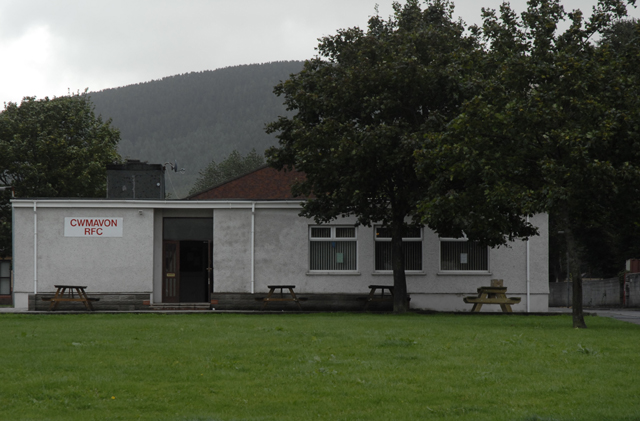
- Full name: Cwmavon Rugby Football Club
- Nickname: The Reds
- Location: Cwmavon, Wales
- Ground: Welfare Ground
- League: WRU Division Two West Central
- 2011-12: 5th
Team kit

Official website
- www.freewebs.com/cwmafanrfc/index.htm

Cwmavon Rugby Football Club also known as Cwmafan Rugby Football Club (Welsh: Clwb Rygbi Cwmafan) is a rugby union club based in Cwmavon, Wales. Cwmavon RFC is a member club of the Welsh Rugby Union, and is a feeder club for the Ospreys.

The club badge depicts a shield split in half vertically with the left side containing the Lamb of God rampant and the right side a red dragon rampant. A banner underneath bears the club name.

Cwmavon RFC has seen several past players selected to represent the Wales national team; although none of them did so while playing with the club having moved on to more senior teams.

== Former players of note ==
- (Wales) Dan Edwards
- (Wales) Emlyn Davies (2 caps)
- (Wales) Oswald Griffiths
- (Wales) Trevor Lloyd
- (Wales) Walter Vickery (4 caps)
