= Tonna RFC =

Welsh rugby union club, based in Tonna

(Wales) Tonna RFC
- Full name: Tonna Rugby Football Club
- Nickname: Dingle Boys / The Ton
- Founded: 1888; 138 years ago
- Location: Tonna, Wales
- League: A WRU Division 3C West Central
- 2017–18: 11th WRU Division Four South West
Team kit

Official website
- tonnarfc.co.uk

Tonna Rugby Football Club is a rugby union team from the village of Tonna, Wales. Tonna RFC is a member of the Welsh Rugby Union and is a feeder club for the Ospreys.

== History ==
Although it is believed that Tonna RFC existed before 1888, the club was first mentioned during the 1887/88 season, when the Cambria Daily Reader stated that Tonna RFC were drawn to play Mynydd-bach in the local Neath cup challenge. It is therefore regarded that Tonna RFC came into being on 28 February 1888.

Tonna RFC's first international player was David Harris Davies. Although he played for Neath RFC at the time of his one and only cap against Scotland in 1904, he came through the playing ranks of Tonna.

The club disbanded after the outbreak of the First World War, but reformed as Dulais United after the war ended. This team was an amalgamation of local villages Tonna, Aberdulais, Cadoxton, and Cilfrew but the team was still housed in Tonna.

== Notable players ==
Full Senior Internationals

- (Wales) David Harris Davies - Neath RFC (1 cap)
- (Wales) Arthur Lemon - Neath RFC (13 caps)
- (Wales) Martyn Davies - Neath RFC (1 Cap)
- (Wales) Alan Edmunds- Aberavon RFC, Neath RFC (2 caps)
- (Wales) Craig Mitchell Neath RFC, Ospreys, Exeter Chiefs, Cardiff Blues, Newport Gwent Dragons, Bath (15 caps)
- (Wales) Leigh Davies Neath RFC, Cardiff RFC, Bristol RFC, Ospreys, Llanelli Scarlets (Captain) - 21 Caps
- (United Kingdom) Doug Phillips (rugby) Douglas V Phillips Rugby League International Oldham RLFC, Broughton Park Rangers RLFC Belle Vue RLFC. 9 Wales RL Caps & 4 Great Britain Caps (including 1950 Series win in Australia)
- Barbarians RFC Martyn Davies (Neath RFC), Chris Gittins (Aberavon RFC)
