= Bridgend Athletic RFC =

(Wales) Bridgend Athletic RFC
- Full name: Bridgend Athletic Rugby Football Club Ltd.
- Nickname: "The Ath"
- Founded: 1972
- Location: Bridgend, Wales
- Ground(s): Newbridge Fields, Bridgend.
- Chairman: Philip Rees
- Coach: John Apsee
- League: National League Division 1 West (central)
- 2020/21: season curtailed Covid.
Team kit

Official website
- www.bridgendathleticrfc.wales

Bridgend Athletic RFC are a Welsh rugby union club based in Bridgend in South Wales. They are members of the Welsh Rugby Union playing in the National League Division 1 West and are a feeder club for the Ospreys.

== History ==
Bridgend Athletic RFC was reformed in 1972, after the Bridgend Youth team members in that year wanted to form a senior team so they didn't have to go their separate ways into senior rugby, hence the formation of the club which had previously existed up to 1939. The club become full members of the Welsh Rugby Union in 1983. 1989 saw the creation of the club's mini and junior section which is renowned for being among the best in the country. The club were promoted from Division 5 Central in 2001, were WRU Division Four East Champions in 2002, were then promoted from Division 3 to WRU Division Two West in 2003 through the league organisation and were promoted to Division 1 in 2004. They have suffered relegation from that league once, but recovered in 2009, winning WRU Division Two West. In 2012 they were included in the newly formed Swalec Championship, where they narrowly lost their opening game 28-29 to Bonymaen.

== Club honours ==
- 2001-02 WRU Division Four East - Champions
- 2008-09 WRU Division Two West- Champions
- 2008-09 Ospreys Cup Under 16 - Champions
- 2008-09 Ospreys Cup Under 15 - Champions
- 2008-09 Ospreys Cup Under 14 - Champions
- 2008-09 Ospreys Cup Under 13 - Champions
- 2008-09 Ospreys Cup Under 12 - Champions
- 2014-15 [(Ospreys Cup)] Under 15 - Champions
- 2015-16 [(National Youth Cup)] Youth - Champions

== Notable players ==
- Lee Byrne - British & Irish Lions, Wales RU, Ospreys, Clermont Auvergne, Dragons
- Rhys Webb - Ospreys & Wales RU, British & Irish Lions
- Scott Baldwin - Ospreys & Wales RU
- Phil Price- Dragons
- Tom Habberfield - Ospreys / Wales U20/Wales 7s
- Matthew Morgan - Ospreys / Wales U20. Wales RU
- Luke Morgan - Ospreys / Wales U20 / Wales 7s
- Nicky Griffiths - Wales 7s
- Lloyd Evans - Wales 7s
- Adrian Durston -Bridgend & Wales RU
- Matt Jones - Ospreys & Wales RU
- Tom Prydie - Dragons & Wales RU
- Josh Navidi - Cardiff Blues & Wales RU, British & Irish Lions

== Coaches ==
- Director of Coaching: John Apsee
- Technical Consultant: Gerald Williams
- Backs Coach: Stuart Morris
- Forwards Coach: Dai Williams
