= Carmarthen Athletic RFC =

Welsh rugby union club

(Wales) Carmarthen Athletic RFC
- Full name: Carmarthen Athletic Rugby Football Club
- Nickname(s): Athletic/Red & Black's
- Founded: 1944
- Location: Carmarthen, Wales
- Ground(s): Athletic Park, Johnstown, Carmarthen SA31 3QY (Capacity: 1,500)
- President: Delme Owens
- Coach: Gary Beaumont-Morgan/Gareth Bennett/Justin Lloyd
- League: Swalec WRU Division One West
- 2013-2014: 8th.
Team kit

Official website
- carmarthenathleticrfc.mywru.co.uk

Carmarthen Athletic Rugby Football Club is one of two Welsh rugby union clubs based in Carmarthen in West Wales. The other is Carmarthen Quins RFC. The club is a member of the Welsh Rugby Union and is a feeder club for the Scarlets region.

== Overview ==
The club also run a seconds team, "The Druids", who play in the Carmarthenshire Tyres League. The club run a youth team which have won the Welsh National Youth Cup twice in their history (on 14 April 1993 at the National Stadium, Cardiff Arms Park vs. Merthyr Youth by 6 points to 3 and on 11 May 2013 at the Millennium Stadium vs. Gorseinon Youth by 43pts. to 12) along with many junior teams from under 7s to under 16s. Two life members of the club have represented the British & Irish Lions, W.D. (Delme) Thomas 1966,1968 & 1971 and R.T.E.(Roy) Bergiers 1974. The club playing strip comprises black with red hoops on the jersey, black shorts, and black socks with red tops. The club song is "Early in The Morning", the same title was used for the acclaimed 50th Anniversary publication written by Life Member Neil Davies in 1994.

The club was formed on 6 June 1944 (D-Day) during the Second World War. The club played its home games at Five Fields until the land was acquired by Tesco for a new store. The club re-located and developed a new facility at a site which was part of the Trinity College sports fields in Johnstown, Carmarthen. The new facility includes a 60 m × 40 m indoor training barn which was used by the Welsh national team before the South Africa game on 24 November 2007. The club now plays all its home games at the new ground, named Athletic Park, in Johnstown, Carmarthen.

On 28 August 2009, Dennis Gethin, the President of the Welsh Rugby Union, officially opened the new clubhouse and ground complex at Athletic Park, in time for the 2009–10 season. The WRU have a regional development office at the ground.

== Notable former players ==
The following players have represented Carmarthen Athletic and have also been capped at senior international level.

- (Wales) Roy Bergiers (British Lion)
- (Wales) Handel Greville
- (Wales) Lynn 'Cowboy' Davies
- (Wales) Gerald Davies (British Lion)
- (Wales) Mark Douglas
- (Wales) Emyr Lewis
- (Wales) Phil Lewis
- (Wales) Ken Owens (British & Irish Lion)
- (Wales) Gary Pearce
- (Wales) Rhys Priestland
- (Wales) Delme Thomas (British Lion)
- (Wales) Henry Morgan
- (Wales) Justin Thomas
- (Wales) Barry Davies
- (Wales) Ryan Elias
- (Wales) Aled Davies
- (Wales) Victoria Owens
