= Loughor RFC =

- Full name: Loughor Rugby Football Club
- Nickname(s): The Blues
- Founded: 1882
- Location: Loughor, Wales
- Ground(s): Villa Field
- League(s): WRU Division Two West
- 2009-10: 7th
Team kit

Official website
- www.pitchero.com/clubs/loughor/

Loughor Rugby Football Club is a rugby union Club representing the town of Loughor, Swansea, South Wales. Loughor RFC is a member of the Welsh Rugby Union and is a feeder club for the Ospreys. Rugby was first played in Loughor in 1882, with evidence of two distinct teams forming in the upper and lower parts of the village. The team from the lower end of the village were called Bwlch-y-mynydd and played in green, while the upper team played in a black strip.

The first competitive competition involving Loughor was when they joined the Swansea and District Rugby League in the 1910–11 season.

Throughout the late 1990s to the present day Loughor have risen rapidly through the ranks of Welsh rugby thanks to the foresight of the club management committee.

== Club honours ==
- West Wales Rugby Union Cup 1952/53 - Winners
- West Wales Championship 1953/54 - Champions
