= Carmarthen Quins RFC =

Welsh rugby union club

(Wales) Carmarthen Quins RFC
- Full name: Carmarthen Quins RFC
- Nickname: Quins
- Founded: 1875; 151 years ago
- Location: Carmarthen, Wales
- Ground: Carmarthen Park (Capacity: 3,000)
- President: Brian Jones
- Coach: Steffan Thomas
- League: Super Rygbi Cymru
- 2024-2025: Super Rygbi Cymru, 9th, Quarter-Finalists
Team kit

Official website
- www.carmarthenquinsrfc.co.uk

Carmarthen Quins Rugby Football Club (Welsh: Clwb Rygbi Cwins Caerfyrddin) are one of two Welsh rugby union clubs based in Carmarthen in West Wales, the other being Carmarthen Athletic.

They currently play in the Super Rygbi Cymru and are a feeder club for the Scarlets regional team.

== Club history ==
During the 2005–06 season Carmarthen Quins were relegated from the Welsh Premier Division and placed in Division One West, making a return to the Premier league after winning the West league in 2008–09. Carmarthen were to face Blackwood, winners of Division One East in a play-off for promotion; but because Blackwood's ground was deemed not to meet WRU standards for the Premier league, the game was forfeited.

== Club honours ==
- WRU Division One West Champions: 2008–09

== Super Rygbi Cymru ==
=== SRC Trophy ===
Season	Position/Round	Played	Won	Drawn	Lost	Bonus	Points
2024–25	9th	18	6	0	12	12	36
2024–25	Wildcard Round	Won 12-15 v RGC					
2024–25	Quarter-final	Lost 45–35 v Ebbw Vale RFC					
2025–26	7th	18	9	1	8	11	49
2025–26	Wildcard Round	Home v Pontypool RFC					

=== SRC Cup ===
Season	Position/Round	Played	Won	Drawn	Lost	Bonus	Points
2024–25	5th Pool B	4	0	0	4	3	3
2025–26	4th Pool A	4	1	1	2	0	6
2025–26	Plate Semi-final	Lost 21–5 v Swansea RFC					

== Notable former players ==
See Category:Carmarthen Quins RFC players
