= Penclawdd RFC =

Welsh rugby union club, based in Swansea

(Wales) Penclawdd RFC
- Full name: Penclawdd Rugby Football Club
- Nickname: The Donks
- Founded: 1888; 138 years ago
- Location: Penclawdd, Wales
- Ground: The Rec
- President: Conway Jones
- League: WRU Division One West
- 2019-20: 3rd
Team kit

Official website
- www.penclawddrfc.org.uk

Penclawdd RFC is a Rugby Football Club representing the town of Penclawdd, Swansea, Wales, UK. The club is a member of the Welsh Rugby Union and is a feeder club for the Ospreys. Players from the club are nicknamed the Donks.

== History ==
Division 3 West Winners 2005.

Penclawdd Rugby Club officially formed in 1888, but rugby has been played in the village since 1880–81, the same year as the founding of the Welsh Rugby Union. In its formative years the club had no permanent pitch, but played on suitable available ground in various areas of the village. It initially used the Dunraven Field, later Cae Dono (Dono's field) on top of the Graig, and during the years preceding the First World War, a field at Graig-y-Coed was favoured. During the 1906-06 season Penclawdd were unsuccessful in its application to join the WRU. The club was disbanded during the First World War years but re-formed once the war ended.

In 1922 the club obtained its own pitch for the first time. It leased the Welfare ground known as the Rec., situated at the foot of the Graig, behind the Tabernacle Chapel. A pavilion was built on the land for the use of the Penclawdd Rugby and Cricket Clubs. In 1927 Penclawdd received Welsh Rugby Union membership, twenty two years after its initial application.

The 1946–47 season saw the establishment of the Penclawdd Rugby Youth.

== Club badge ==
The club badge is a shield divided into quarters. Each quarter contains an image associated with the area. The castle and portcullis gate represent the gate to the Gower, the Prince of Wales's feathers and dragon are symbols of Wales, and the cockles represent Penclawdd’s big industry was once the collecting of cockles.

== Club honours ==
- 2004–05 WRU Division Three West - Championshttps://en.m.wikipedia.org/wiki/File:Penclawdd_RFC_team_victory_picture_(Division_3_West_Winners_2005).jpg

== Notable former players ==
- William Thomas Harcourt Davies (6 caps) Also played rugby league for Wales and Great Britain. Was the second winner of the Lance Todd Trophy when playing for Bradford Northern in Rugby League Challenge Cup Final 1947.
- (Wales) Bryn Evans (1 cap)
- (Wales) Haydn Tanner (25 caps 13 as Captain and 1 British Lions test in 1939 - South Africa)
- (Wales) Doug Rees (3 caps)1968
- Clive Griffiths (1 cap) 1979 and Wales Defence Coach in 2005 Grand Slam
