= Llangennech RFC =

Rugby team in Carmarthenshire, Wales

(Wales) Llangennech RFC
- Full name: Llangennech Rugby Football Club
- Union: Welsh Rugby Union
- Nickname: Bois y Llan
- Founded: 1885; 141 years ago
- Location: Llangennech, Wales
- Ground: Llangennech Main Field
- Chairman: Tony James
- President: Richard Phillips
- Coach: Ian Jones
- League: Welsh Premier Division
- 2024-2025: Welsh Premier Division, 7th
Team kit

Official website
- www.llangennechrfc.com

Llangennech Rugby Football Club are a Welsh rugby union club based in Llangennech in Carmarthenshire, Wales. Llangennech RFC is a member of the Welsh Rugby Union.

Llangennech Rugby Football Club was established in 1885, when enthusiasm for the game had spread across local villages after Llanelli won the South Wales trophy.

Since then Llangennech has had a side that has played in every rugby season since 1885, with only the two World wars breaking the run.

The First XV play in the WRU Premiership. There are over 200+ registered mini & junior players, with teams from Under 7's right up to Under 16's. 20+ Youth and 30+ Senior players. Along with vice-presidents, patrons, members, officers and committee, the club membership is over 400.

== History ==
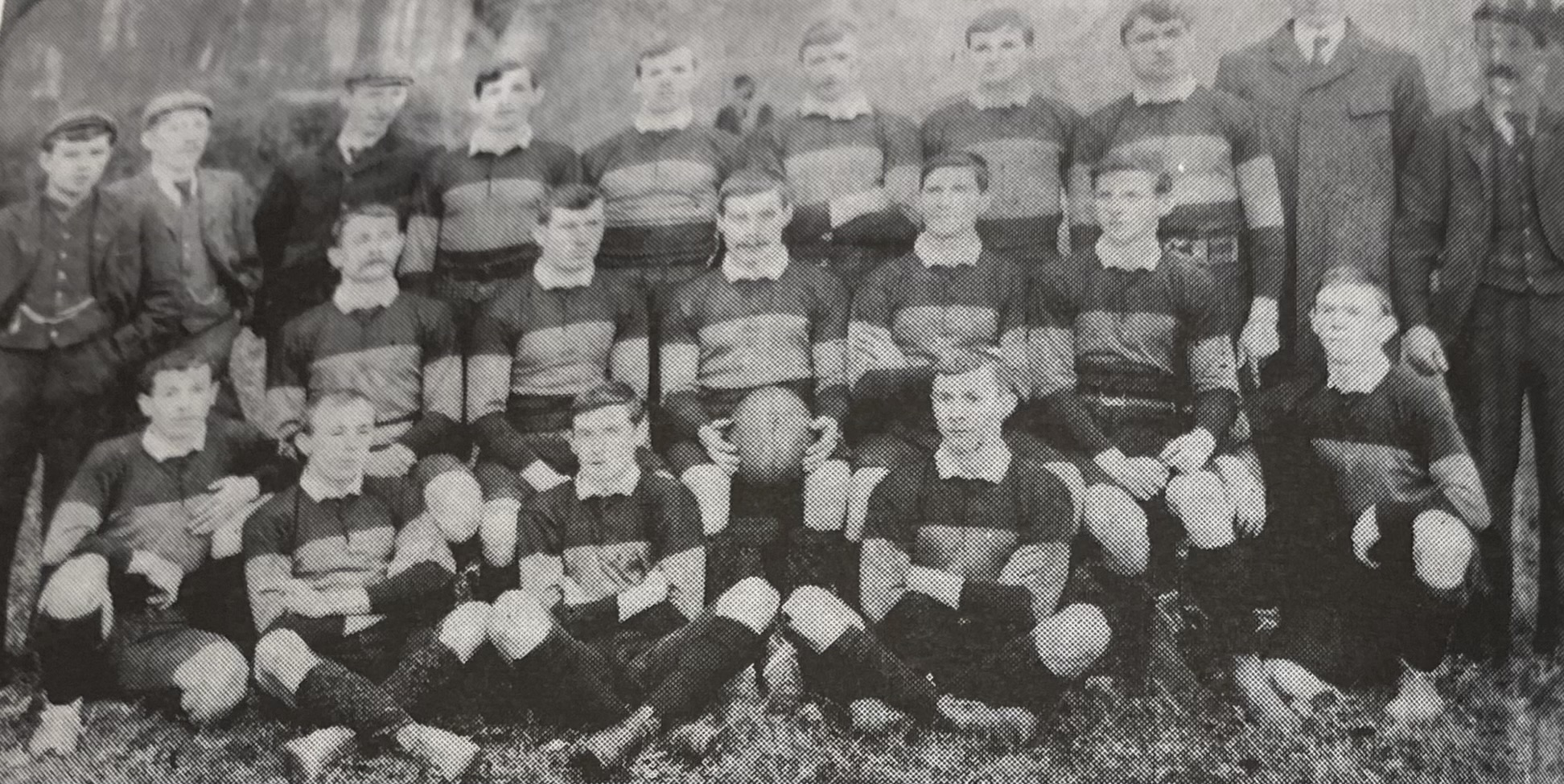
Llangennech's 1903-04 team

The team played their first game in 1885. It garnered good press coverage for a year, but this stopped until 1892. Press coverage for other local teams continued. It is believed that the minister of the local Salem Chapel, Phillip Phillips, had a distaste for the game and used his influence to disband the team. He is quoted as saying "Kick? If I took a good mule down to the field he'd kick them out of existence. Men were not made to compete with donkeys".

== Club honours ==
- West Wales Rugby Union - Section 'B' - Champions 1984-85
- WRU Division 8A West - Champions 1994-95
- WRU Division 7 West - Champions 1996-97
- WRU Division 5 West - Champions 1997-98
- WRU Division 3 West - Champions 2000-01
- West Wales Rugby Union Cup Winners 2004-05
- WRU Division 1 West - Champions 2022-23

== Notable past players ==
See also Category:Llangennech RFC players

There are a number of players who have both represented Llangennech RFC and have also been capped at international level.

- (Wales) Rhys Gabe
- (Wales) Cliff Williams
- (Wales) Idwal Davies (rugby)
- (Wales) Terry Davies - Played for Llangennech Youth
- (Wales) Alun Thomas
- (Wales) Brian Davies - Son of Idwal Davies above
- (Wales) Gavin Evans
- (Wales) Lowri Harries
- (Wales) Adam Warren
- (Wales) Sam Parry

Below are players who have represented Llangennech RFC and proceeded to excel in other sports.

- (Wales) Gareth Price - rugby league
- (Wales) Idwal Davies - rugby league
- (Wales) Les Thomas - rugby league
- (Wales) Steffan Jones - cricket
- (Wales) Flex Lewis - bodybuilding - Played for Llangennech Youth
