= Nantymoel RFC =

- Full name: Nantymoel Rugby Football Club
- Nickname(s): The Moel
- Founded: 1885/86
- Location: Nantymoel, Wales
- Ground(s): Nantymoel Park (Capacity: 300)
- Chairman: Andrew Sendell
- Coach(es): Ryan Davies
- League(s): WRU Division three west central

Official website
- www.pitchero.com/clubs/nantymoel

Nantymoel Rugby Football Club is a Welsh rugby union club based near Bridgend, Wales. The club is a member of the Welsh Rugby Union and is also a feeder club for the Ospreys.

A team was first believed to have established in Nantymoel during the 1885/86 season, but then known as the White Stars.
