= Pontyberem RFC =

Welsh rugby team

- Full name: Pontyberem Rugby Football Club
- Founded: 1895
- Location: Pontyberem, Wales
- Ground(s): Pontyberem Recreation Ground
- League(s): WRU Division Two West
- 2011-12: 11th
Team kit

Official website
- www.pontyberemrfc.co.uk

Pontyberem Rugby Football Club is a Welsh rugby union team based in Pontyberem, Carmarthenshire. The club is a member of the Welsh Rugby Union and is a feeder club for the Llanelli Scarlets.

== Club honours ==
- 1960-61 West Wales Cup Winners
- 1988-89 WWRU Section D Champions
- 1990-91 WWRU Section B Champions
- 1991-92 West Wales Cup Winners
- 1994-95 Welsh League Division 6 West - Champions
- 2003-04 WRU Division Three West- Champions
- 2008-09 WRU Division Three West- Champions
- 2014-2015 WRU Division 3 West A - Champions
