= Whitland RFC =

Rugby team in Carmarthenshire, Wales

(Wales) Whitland RFC
- Full name: Whitland Rugby Football Club
- Nickname: The Borderers
- Founded: 1910 (c)
- Location: Whitland, Wales
- Ground: Parc Llwyn-Ty-Gwyn (Capacity: 450) and Parc Dr. Owen)
- President: Gilbert Williams
- League: WRU Division One West
- 2018-19: 5th
Team kit

Official website
- www.whitlandrfc.co.uk

Whitland RFC are a Welsh rugby union club based in Whitland, West Wales. They are the presently members of the Welsh Rugby Union playing in Division One West and is a feeder club for the Llanelli Scarlets.

== Early history ==
Whitland RFC is thought to have been founded around 1910, but little verifiable information exists to support a definite date. Club development stalled during the Great War years, but in the 1919/20 season Whitland RFC took part in the Pembrokeshire Knock Out Cup. As with many Welsh teams, the inter-war years were difficult and the team disbanded in January 1930. The club reformed for the 1938-39 season and has existed in that form since. Mike Phillips (Ospreys, Wales & British and Irish Lions), Jonathan Davies (Scarlets, Wales & British and Irish Lions) and James Davies (Scarlets & Wales) brother of Jonathan played their club rugby for Whitland as have Aled Davies (Scarlets, Ospreys & Wales) and Scott Williams (Llanelli Scarlets & Wales).
