= Bonymaen RFC =

(Wales) Bonymaen RFC
- Full name: Bonymaen Rugby Football Club
- Nickname: Bony
- Founded: 1914; 112 years ago
- Location: Bonymaen, Wales
- Ground: Parc Mawr
- President: Gary Jenkins
- Coach(es): Sam Kyle, Peter Thomas, Greg Cunniffe, Dai Hills.
- Captain: Joe Yates
- League: Welsh Championship West
- 2024-2025: Welsh Premier Division, 12th (relegated)
Team kit

Official website
- bonymaenrfc.mywru.co.uk

Bonymaen Rugby Football Club are a Welsh rugby union club based in the village of Bon-y-maen, Swansea, South Wales. Bonymaen RFC currently play in the WRU Championship and are a feeder club for the Ospreys. also including teams from under 6s to the under 16s, youth, Bonymaen 2nds, Bonymaen 1sts and Bonymaen Ladies.

In May 2006 Bonymaen RFC were one of the 13 'Rebel' clubs who brought a vote of no confidence against the Welsh Rugby Union, which centered on financing and the handling of former coach Mike Ruddock's departure. The vote failed heavily with only 20 votes for the motion and over 300 against.

In the 2006–07 season, Bonymaen RFC won the Division One West League, but were denied promotion to the Premier League as their grounds were deemed to not meet WRU criteria. This ruling was upheld in an EGM by 67% of members.

In the 2014–15 season, Bonymaen RFC won Division 1 West Central, losing just 2 league games all year, both away against Maesteg Quins and Trebanos. This meant a play off with the winners of Division 1 West, Newcastle Emlyn. Played at a neutral venue in Carmarthen, Emlyn won the game and Bony remained in Division 1 West Central for the following season.

In the 2015–16 season Bonymaen enjoyed less success, finishing 5th in the league that they had won the previous year. As of 19 December 2016, they currently sit top of Division 1 West Central.

== Club honours ==
- 2006–07 Division 1 West League – Champions
- 2014–15 Division 1 West Central – Champions
- 2018–19 – WRU Plate – Runners-Up

== Notable former players ==
The below lists players who have played for Bonymaen and have also played rugby at an international level.

- (Wales) Malcolm Dacey
- (Wales) Richard Webster
- (Wales) Alun Wyn Jones
- (Wales) Rory Thornton
