= Seven Sisters RFC =

Welsh rugby union club, based in Neath Port Talbot

(Wales) Seven Sisters RFC
- Full name: Seven Sisters Rugby Football Club
- Founded: 1897; 129 years ago
- Location: Seven Sisters, Wales
- Ground: Maes Dafydd (Capacity: 3000)
- Chairman: Jeff 'Jako' Davies
- President: Hywel Francis
- Coach: Aled Hopkins (Forwards) Gavin Hooper (Backs)
- League: WRU Division Two West Central
- 2014-15: 9th
Team kit

Official website
- sevensistersrfc.mywru.co.uk

Seven Sisters RFC (Welsh:Clwb Rygbi Blaendulais) is a rugby union club representing the village of Seven Sisters, Wales, with the men's playing in the WRU Division 2 west central league and the women's playing in the Premiership. The club are members of the Welsh Rugby Union and is a feeder club for the Ospreys.

== History ==
Seven Sisters RFC formed in 1897, in the industrialised South Wales coalfield. The women's team was established on the 17th March 2007 and remains one of the oldest currently formed women's teams in the country.

During The 1950s and 1960s, when touring teams came to play Seven Sisters they would often be given a tour of the colliery prior to playing a match. It was reputedly common practice that when they were lowered down the shaft, the winding man would deliberately allow the cage to drop like a stone before applying the brake at the last moment. Few touring teams won their matches.

Seven Sisters RFC were relegated in the 2006-07 season from Division Two West into Division Three South West of the Welsh National Leagues. Seven had a mediocre year after their relegation from Division 2 finishing the year in 6th position. The following Season they narrowly avoided being relegated after a dramatic losing bonus point defeat in the last game of the Season saved them and kept them in Division 3. This was the season when coaches Jeff 'Jako' Davies, Geraint Ellis took over, Julian Hopkins was appointed the Backs Coach a Season later.

Seven Sisters RFC have gone from strength to strength following their near relegation in the 2008-2009 season. In the years seasons since then they have finished consistently higher up the league every year. They finished 5th in the 2009-2010, and then 3rd in the 2010-2011 Season.

The 2011-2012 season has again been a more successful season than the previous with Seven finishing 2nd in the league and winning promotion to division 2 for the 2012/2013. They also finished runners up in the West Wales Bowl Competition narrowly losing out 27-26 to Tumble in the Final.

The women's team played their first ever fixture on the 17th March 2007 against Bath Spa University. They formally entered the league in 07/08 and began playing competitive fixtures across teams in South Wales. The women's team won the WRU National Plate, held at the Principality Stadium, on the 30th March 2025 against opponents CRCC. In the previous season, they experienced an historic run, finishing top 2 in the women's Premiership league, and losing in the WRU Cup Final against Llandaff North. In their history, the women's team have played in 9 WRU Plate finals and 1 WRU Cup final.

== Club honours ==
Trophy	Year(s)
Vadre Cup	1930's
Neath Sevens Tournament	1954-54
Neath And District Cup	1947; 1948;
Pontardawe Sevens Cup	1957-58
West Wales Cup	1957; 1958; 1976; 1984
West Wales President's Cup	1957; 1958; 1961; 1991; 2002
West Wales Championship	1958; 1961; 1967; 1968; 1991
Glamorgan County Silver Ball Trophy	1959-60
Neath Junior Cup	1962; 1963; 1964; 1973
Neath And District Shield	1965; 1966
Neath And District Youth Cup	1968; 1969; 1970; 1971; 1972; 1973; 1975; 1976; 1993
O G Davies Cup	1974; 1976; 1977; 1978; 1980; 1983; 1984; 1987; 1988; 1989; 1990; 1991; 1992; 1993; 2000
Neath And District League	1984
Neath And District All Winner's Cup	1984
Neath And District Championship	1985; 2002
Neath And District Div 1 Championship	1996
H.G Lewis Cup	2002
Ospreys U16's Plate	2005
Swalec Cup: Semi-Final v Llanelli	1997-98

== Club records ==
- Most Points - Tommy James 1591 pts
- Most Points In A Season - Alun Davies (1983–84) 320 pts
- Most Tries - Ian Watts 156 Tries
- Most Appearances - Brian Howell 680

== See also ==
- Rugby union in Wales
