= Kidwelly RFC =

Welsh rugby team

(Wales) Kidwelly RFC
- Full name: Kidwelly Rugby Football Club
- Nickname(s): Black and Ambers
- Founded: 1884 (c)
- Location: Kidwelly, Wales
- Ground: Parc Stephens (Capacity: Unknown)
- Chairman: Paul Martin
- Coach: Jonathan Griffiths
- League: WRU Division One West
- 2023—2024: 8th
Team kit

Official website
- kidwelly.rfc.wales

Kidwelly Rugby Football Club is a rugby union club representing the town of Kidwelly, Carmarthenshire, South Wales. Rugby was first played in Kidwelly around 1880, though as is usual within early Welsh rugby history, no written evidence exists to give an exact year of formation. Kidwelly RFC are members of the Welsh Rugby Union and is a feeder club for the Llanelli Scarlets.

Between 1890 and 1891, a former Kidwelly RFC senior player, Stephen Thomas, represented Wales in three international games, though at the time of these matches he played for Llanelli RFC. Two other former Kidwelly players, Ray Gravell and Gerald Davies, represented Wales, though Gravelle had only played for the Kidwelly youth team.

== Notable former players ==
- (Wales) Gerald Davies (46 caps)
- (Wales) Stephen Thomas (3 caps)

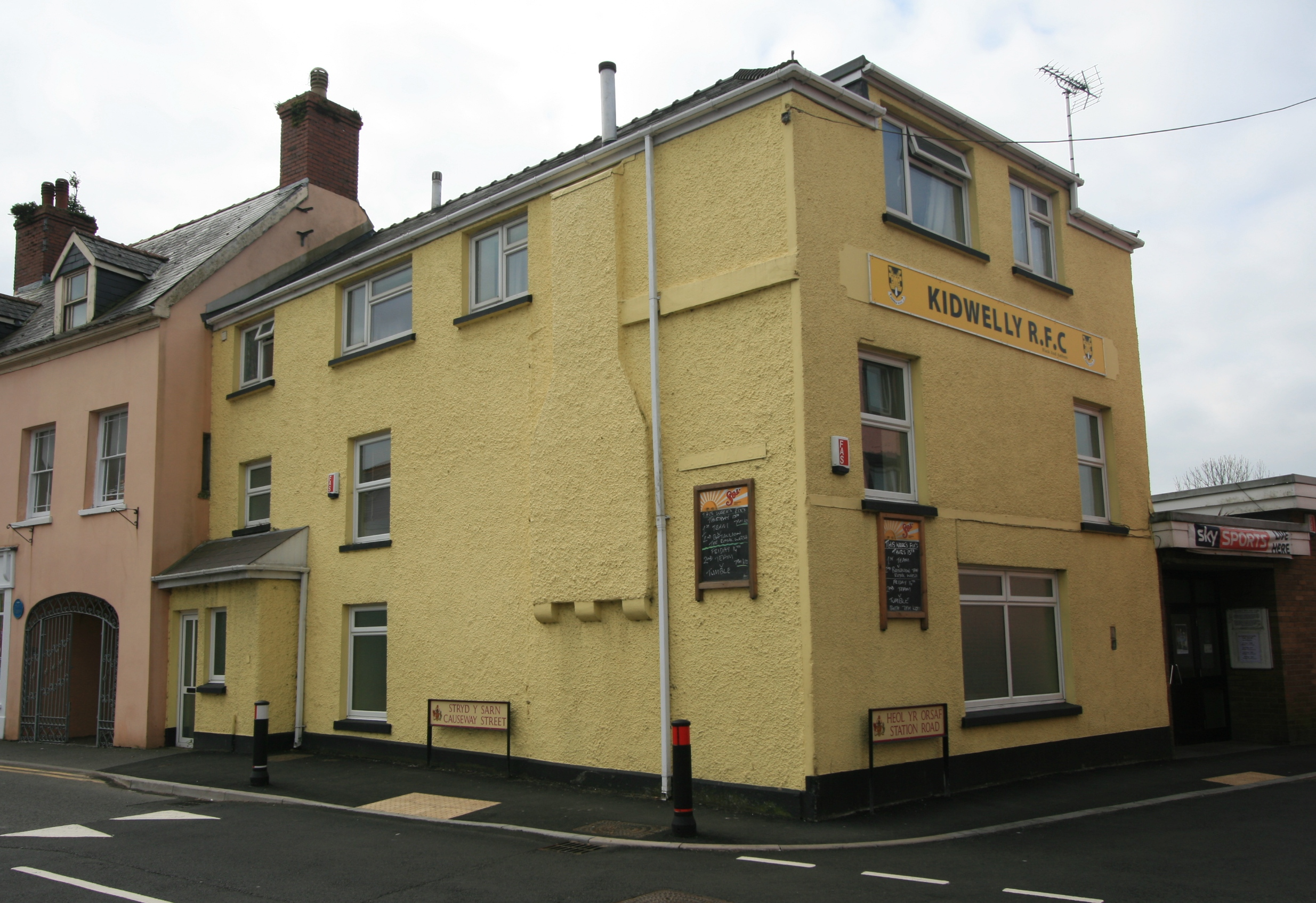
Kidwelly RFC Headquarters in Station Road, Kidwelly
