= We'll Keep a Welcome (album) =

Studio album by Bryn Terfel
- Released: 2000
- Recorded: 2000
- Genres: Classical music, Welsh music
- Length: 1:14:33
- Label: Deutsche Grammophon

Bryn Terfel chronology
Something Wonderful (1996)	We'll Keep a Welcome (2000)	Some Enchanted Evening (2001)

We'll Keep a Welcome is a 2000 album by singer Bryn Terfel of traditional hymns and folk songs associated with Wales. Terfel was accompanied on the album by the Orchestra of the Welsh National Opera, the Risca Male Choir and The Black Mountain Chorus. The majority of the songs are sung in the Welsh language.

== Reception ==
The Gramophone magazine review by Adrian Mitchell felt that the album was a "finely sung and unashamedly patriotic collection of songs" and that with its large number of musicians it is "...impossible to prevent the occasional jolt to the ear". Edwards praised Chris Hazell's arrangements for oboe of "Ar Lan y Mor (On the Seashore)", an "Suo-Gan (Lullaby)". Edwards highlighted Terfel's vocal sensitivity on "Dafydd y Garreg Wen (David of the White Rock)" and felt that the performance of the choirs and harpists provides "...the best possible advertisement for repertoire too long neglected by the major record companies". The Allmusic review of We'll Keep a Welcome described the album as a "no-holds-barred celebration of Welsh song" with "...gentle lullabies and nostalgic songs of a missed homeland as well as rip-roaring patriotic numbers"; concluding that it was "...a welcome selection indeed, with songs of unabashedly warm emotions made all the more irresistible by Terfel's obvious sincerity and vocal charisma".

== Track listing ==
1. "Hen Wlad Fy Nhadau (Land of My Fathers)" (Evan James, James James) – 2:19
2. "Ar Lan y Môr (On the Seashore)" (Traditional) – 3:20
3. "Dafydd y Garreg Wen (David of the White Rock)" (Traditional; David Owen, John Ceiriog Hughes) – 3:00
4. "Ymdaith Gwyr Harlech (Men of Harlech)" (Traditional; John Oxenford, Hughes) – 2:48
5. "My Little Welsh Home" (W. S. Gwynn Williams) – 2:55
6. "Calon Lân (A Pure Heart)" (Daniel James (Gwyrosydd), John Hughes) – 2:35
7. "Suo Gân (Lullaby)" (Traditional; Robert Bryan) – 5:06
8. "Sosban Fach (Little Saucepan)" (Traditional; Richard Davies (Mynyddog)) – 2:52
9. "Bugail Aberdyfi (The Shepherd of Aberdovey)" (Hughes, Idris Lewis) – 4:29
10. "Cwm Rhondda" (John Hughes, William Williams Pantycelyn) – 3:41
11. "Myfanwy" (Joseph Parry, Davies) – 3:30
12. "Cymru Fach (Dearest Wales)" (David Richards, Elfed) – 3:56
13. "Ar Hyd y Nos (All Through the Night)" (Traditional; Hughes) – 4:50
14. "Sunset Poem (Eli Jenkins' Prayer)" (Dylan Thomas, A. H. D. Troyte) – 2:41
15. "We'll Keep a Welcome" (Mai Jones, James Harper, Lyn Joshua) – 3:11
16. "Tydi A Roddaist" (Arwel Hughes, Thomas Rowland Hughes) – 3:21
17. "Diolch I'r Ior (Thank You My Lord)" (T. Gwynn Jones) – 3:58
18. "Sul y Blodau (Palm Sunday)" (Owen John Williams, Eifion Wyn) – 5:00
19. "Hyfrydol" (Rowland Prichard, William Williams) – 3:32
20. "Hiraeth (Longing)" (Traditional) – 3:12
21. "Hen Wlad Fy Nhadau (Land of My Fathers)" – 4:17

== Personnel ==
- Bryn Terfel – vocals
- Katherine Thomas – harp on "Dafydd y Garreg Wen (David of the White Rock)"
- Meinir Heulyn – harp on "Dafydd y Garreg Wen (David of the White Rock)" and "Hiraeth (Longing)"
- Bryan Davis – piano, organ
- Risca Male Choir – choir
- The Black Mountain Chorus – chorus
- Orchestra of the Welsh National Opera
- Gareth Jones – conductor

Production

- Chris Hazell – producer
- Sid McLauchlan, Paul Moseley – associate producer
- James Lock, Jonathan Stokes – balance engineer
- Mike Evans – choir director
- Menai Davies – language coach
- Evans Mirages – executive producer
- Bryan Davies – musical advisor
- Nigel Hughes – photography

== Charts ==
Chart performance for We'll Keep a Welcome
Chart (2000–2026)	Peak position
Australian Albums (ARIA)	43
Australian Classical Albums (ARIA)	5
New Zealand Albums (RMNZ)	13
UK Albums (Official Charts)	33
UK Classical Artist Albums (Official Charts)	2
