= Gren =

British artist (1934–2007)

Cartoon by Gren set in the South Wales Valleys

Grenfell "Gren" Jones MBE (13 June 1934 – 4 January 2007) was one of Wales's best-known and longest-serving newspaper cartoonists.

== Biography ==
The son of coal miner Harry Jones, Gren was born in Hengoed in the Rhymney Valley. Aged eight he began drawing caricatures of neighbours and pocket cartoons in the style of Ronald Niebour ("Neb") of the Daily Mail in his hymn book at his local chapel: "Neb was responsible for my first interest in cartoons. I used to go to my grandmother's, who would have the Daily Mail, and I was amazed how the cartoonist could do a different drawing every day."

He then started sending pictures to agents, desperate to earn a living from his obsession with drawing. Later, he scribbled in lay-bys, when he should have been selling tiles and machine tools as a travelling rep. From 1958 to 1963 Gren was employed as an engineering designer.

Gren's first published drawing was a joke cartoon for Spick & Span, and afterwards he sold his first news-related cartoon to the Birmingham Mail, with the help of John Philpin Jones ("Jon") of the News Chronicle: "When I first started I spent a lot of time with Jon, of the Daily Mail. He said draw what you know. And I knew about rugby and the Valleys.".

In 1960 Gren became one of the founder members of the "Knights of the Round Table", a pop group that would later transform itself into the successful satirical group The Barron Knights. For a number of years Jones then worked as a freelance cartoonist before in 1968 getting a staff job on the Western Mail. Gren produced a daily topical cartoon, but is best known for creating the weekly strip "Ponty and Pop" in the Football Echo, the Saturday sports edition of the Western Mail's sister paper South Wales Echo.

With the words of Jon in his mind, the cartoons depicted South Wales valley life, centred on the fictional village of Aberflyarff in Scrumcap Valley on the River Efflew. Rugby, tightly-packed terraced streets, and local politicians all supplemented popular recurring characters, including: Nigel and Neville the message-bearing sheep; Ponty and Pop; and Bromide Lil, the tattooed barmaid of the Golden Dap.

Gren's cartoon featured figures and acquaintances, including Max Boyce, Harry Secombe and Wyn Calvin. He was known for producing topical cartoons quickly, often completing them after morning discussions with the newspaper's editor.

His strip "Big Deal", also known as "Threadneedle", was syndicated for thirty-five years, and he has also produced golf, cricket and rugby sporting calendars, as well as some with a business theme – notably for Bemrose Publishers for 20 years. He was official 'war artist' for the Welsh Rugby Union.

His local popularity gave him other opportunities, including drawing the cover for the Max Boyce album We All Had Doctors' Papers, and resultantly became the first cartoonist to receive a gold disc from the record company EMI.

Through his career he produced over 24 books; while for charity he produced his annual rugby calendar as well as selling numerous original sketches. He was voted best provincial cartoonist in Britain by the CCGB four times: 1983, 1985, 1986, and 1987. He was honoured by the Variety Club for his charity work; given an honorary degree by the University of Glamorgan in 2004; and was made an MBE for services to newspapers in 1989.

Gren retired on his 65th birthday, and said of his job: "When I started out I enjoyed the same things as I'm drawing now. Wales, rugby, local politicians, anything we in this part of the world are able to relate to – I aim to reflect our life and it goes down well with the readers. I'm not trying to prove any points. I try not to get into the political area as that isn't my audience." Gren continued to produce cartoons for the Echo evening paper from home.

Gren, who lived in the Llandaff area of Cardiff, died at the city's University Hospital of Wales on Thursday 4 January 2007.

Fellow cartoonist Bill Tidy paid tribute to Gren: "I was a great admirer of Gren. To me he was a Max Boyce on paper and a Harry Secombe in humour. He raised a large amount of money for charity, he was crazy on rugby and was the only Welshman I'd ever met who sang out of tune deliberately. He had his finger on the pulse of Wales."

== Personal life ==
Married to Anne, the couple had two sons who both became policemen. At the time of Gren's death, he had four grandchildren.

Gren continued to work to the end, with his constant friend and pal at his side: Charlie Friday of Llandaff – a Cocker Spaniel.
