= Gladys Morgan =

Welsh comedian (1898–1983)

- Born: Gladys Mabel Morgan; 7 November 1898; Swansea, Wales
- Died: 16 April 1983 (aged 84); Worthing, England
- Spouse: Frank Laurie
- Children: Joan Laurie, Graham Lorriman

Gladys Mabel Morgan (7 November 1898 – 16 April 1983) was a Welsh comedian, billed variously as the 'Queen of Comedy' or 'the Queen of Laughter', and was renowned for her toothless, ear-splitting, infectious laugh.

== Biography ==
=== Early life and career ===
Gladys Morgan was born in Swansea, Wales, in 1898 and, though her family was not theatrical, she was always interested in the stage and by the time she turned eleven she had her own song and dance act. She joined a children's concert party called The Brilliant Gems, where one of her colleagues was Albert Burdon, who was later to become known as an actor and comedian.

Four foot ten inch Morgan then formed an act called The Three Virgins, with the equally diminutive Betty Jumel on violin and Vy Vivienne on piano.

While touring as a solo singer in a concert party in the Isle of Man, she was asked by the company manager to play the part of an old deaf woman in a sketch. She reluctantly agreed to do so, and was amazed and delighted to find that the audience found her hilarious. She teamed up with and married fellow comedian Frank Laurie, whom she had first met when he was only sixteen. The act was not successful until it was suggested that they swap jobs, with Morgan becoming the comic and Laurie the straight man. The scheme worked and plentiful dates followed. By this time she had dropped her broad Welsh accent in favour of a Lancashire one, possibly in imitation of her hero Frank Randle.

Like many other entertainers Morgan and Laurie worked for ENSA during the war, being joined in the act by their daughter, Joan. The ENSA organiser for northwest England at the time was a man called Bert Hollman. Joan later became Mrs Hollman, with Bert joining the act both as a performer and manager.

=== Welsh Rarebit ===
Morgan's big break came when she auditioned for the popular BBC radio variety show Welsh Rarebit. As the show was for Welsh performers only, producer Mai Jones was reluctant to cast her, as Morgan was well known for her Lancashire accent. A week performing at the Town Hall, Pontypridd using her natural accent was enough to convince Mai that Morgan was indeed Welsh, and she was given a two-minute spot on the show. Her great friend, comedian Wyn Calvin, is reported to have said, "Her maniacal laugh created such a furore it practically filled the two minutes." Morgan became resident comedienne on the show, sharing top billing with a rising young star, Harry Secombe.

Morgan's success on Welsh Rarebit led to many successful variety tours around all the major theatres in the UK, including supporting Frankie Vaughan at the London Palladium in 1961. Along with many television appearances in shows like The Good Old Days, she was frequently heard in popular radio shows such as Workers' Playtime and Midday Music Hall. Regular appearances on Educating Archie and The Frankie Howerd Show, with her trademark striped blazer and cheeky grin established her as one of the country's best-loved performers.

Throughout the 1960s she was kept busy with pantomime and summer season, five tours to Australia, and four sell-out tours of South Africa where the family also had their own series on Springbok Radio called The Morgans.

Morgan made a film with Nancy Kwan, Terry-Thomas and Bud Flanagan in 1965 called The Wild Affair.

Arthritis forced Morgan to retire from show business when she was in her seventies, and she died in Worthing, West Sussex where she had been a resident for 47 years, in 1983. In May 2006 BBC Radio Wales broadcast a 30 minute tribute to Gladys, introduced by Wyn Calvin. In 2012 a Blue Plaque was unveiled by Gladys's daughter Joan Laurie at Gladys's old flat, 30, Salisbury Road, Worthing. The ceremony was attended by Roy Hudd, then President of the British Music Hall Society, Wyn Calvin, Vice President of the British Music Hall Society and the Mayor of Worthing. The plaque was organised by Geoff Bowden, Editor of the British Music Hall Society's magazine The Call Boy in conjunction with the Worthing Society.

=== Quotation ===
A joke from Workers' Playtime: "I gave the lodger a boiled egg for his tea. Me and the kids had egg soup".
