= Siobhán Owen =

Australian singer and harpist (born 1993)

- Born: 4 October 1993 (age 32); Llanfairpwllgwyngyll, Wales
- Origin: Adelaide, Australia
- Genres: Classical, Celtic, Folk, World music
- Occupations: Singer, Harpist
- Instruments: Voice, Harp
- Years active: 2007–present
- Label: Indie
- Website: siobhanowen.com

Siobhán Owen (born 4 October 1993) is a soprano and harpist from Adelaide, South Australia. Owen regularly performs at festivals, concerts and events around Australia and further abroad. She favours classical and Celtic/folk songs, but also sings pop and jazz on occasion.

== Early life ==
Owen was born on 4 October 1993 in North Wales and lived in the Anglesey village of Llanfairpwllgwyngyllgogerychwyrndrobwllllantysiliogogogoch (or Llanfairpwllgwyngyll for short) before moving to Australia with her family in November 1995. At a young age, Owen was encouraged to join the Adelaide Girls Choir (now Young Adelaide Voices) and the St Aloysius College school choir, where she became a regular soloist. Owen began her classical voice training at age nine, with singing teachers Naomi Hede and Norma Knight. She entered her first Eisteddfod around this time winning an Honourable Mention in the nine to thirteen age group. It wasn't long before Owen started winning Eisteddfods, most notably the Classical Voice sections.

== First performances ==
Owen's first solo performance on stage came just after her 10th birthday, in 2003, when she sang in a Riverdance Style show called "Shades of Green", organised by the Adelaide Irish Dancing Association, which toured South Australian theatres. When she was 12, Owen gave her first major solo performance, singing a traditional Irish song at the Adelaide Festival Theatre to an audience of 2,500. The same year, Owen received a Music Scholarship from St Aloysius College and a Choral Scholarship from St. Francis Xavier's Cathedral Choir, where she remained a soloist and chorister for over three years. In August 2007, aged 13, Owen gave her first solo concert for Recitals Australia. She continues to perform for Recitals Australia every year.

== Harp ==
In 2008, Owen received media attention when asked to sing at the Adelaide Fringe Festival with French singer/harpist Cécile Corbel after they met on Myspace. Owen was so inspired by Corbel's harp playing that she decided to start playing harp. She had harp lessons from renowned Adelaide singer/harpist Emma Horwood, and was soon accompanying herself with harp in Celtic and Folk Festivals, concerts and recitals. Owen commissioned South Australian harp maker and luthier Tim Guster to build her a 36-string Celtic harp with special carving. This harp has travelled with Owen all over Australia.

== Festivals ==
Owen has performed at festivals around Australia and internationally, including the following:

=== Australia ===
- Woodford Folk Festival – Woodford, Queensland
- National Folk Festival (Australia) – Canberra, Australian Capital Territory
- National Celtic Festival – Portarlington, Victoria
- Australian Celtic Festival – Glen Innes, New South Wales
- Cygnet Folk Festival – Cygnet, Tasmania
- Tamar Valley Folk Festival – Tamar Valley, Tasmania
- Celtica Festival – Port Adelaide, South Australia
- Kapunda Celtic Festival – Kapunda, South Australia
- Fleurieu Folk Festival – Willunga, South Australia

=== International ===
- Festival Interceltique de Lorient – Lorient, Brittany, France
- Triskell Folk Festival – Trieste, Italy
- Demat! Kansai Celtic Music Festival – Osaka, Japan

== Career ==
2009 – Owen won the Adelaide Eisteddfod Junior Vocal Championship. Also in 2009, she was voted the South Australia Folk Awards "Most Outstanding Emerging Artist".

2010 – Owen was one of ten finalists in the Australian National Young Folk Awards. Performances in 2010 included singing the National Anthem for the Tour Down Under, performing at the Australia Day Awards in the grounds of Government House, Adelaide, presenting her own show Celestial Echoes at the Adelaide Fringe Festival, and singing at Adelaide's Carols by Candlelight. On 7 May 2010, Owen was interviewed by BBC Wales for a feature on their website.

2011 – Owen won two Irish Music Awards – "Best New Irish Music Artist" and "Top Harpist".

2012 – March, Owen was soprano soloist in Ennio Morricone's debut Australian concert in Elder Park for the Adelaide Festival of Arts. 23 June, Owen sang the Welsh National Anthem (Hen Wlad Fy Nhadau) at the Australia vs Wales Rugby Test Match at Allianz Stadium, Sydney. Also in June, Owen released her fourth studio album Storybook Journey. The album was named BBC Radio Wales "Album of the Week" in September, and in December was awarded 2012 Classical Crossover UK "Album of the Year".

2013 – Owen made her UK debut in January, performing concerts in Wales, London and Devon. In March, Owen made her US debut, headlining the Los Angeles St. David's Day Festival. She presented her own Adelaide Fringe Festival shows "Storybook Journey" at Ayers House, Adelaide.

2014 – March, Owen was the voice of Yseult in Alan Simon's new Celtic/rock opera Tristan & Yseult. The premiere show was at Zenith Nantes, France. Simon chose Owen for the part after finding her on YouTube.

2015 – February, Owen was guest lead singer in the Russian premiere of Alan Simon's Tristan & Yseult. She appeared in the first 4 performances at Novosibirsk Theatre of Comeday & Music, Novosibirsk, Siberia.

2017 – February, French Magazine Le Figaro Culture ranked Owen as one of the top ambassadors of the six Celtic Nations.

2017 - May, Owen was awarded the Best Female Artist and her Entwined album won the Best Produced Album in the Australian Celtic Music Awards

2025 - September, Owen sings in "Hollow Knight: Silksong" as Skarrsinger Karmelita, an NPC and boss.

== Discography ==
Purely Celtic (released May 2008)

1. Hen Wlad Fy Nhadau (Land of My Fathers – Welsh)
2. Suo Gân (Lullaby – Welsh)
3. My Lagan Love (Ireland)
4. A Lullaby (Ireland)
5. The Skye Boat Song (Scotland)
6. My Love is Like a Red, Red Rose (Scotland)
7. Amazing Grace (England)
8. Siúil A Rún (Walk My Love – Irish Gaelic)
9. She Moved Through the Fair (Ireland)
10. My Little Welsh Home (Wales)
11. The Ash Grove (Wales)
12. Danny Boy (Ireland)
13. Lilium (Lily – Latin)

Celestial Echoes (released September 2009)

1. Dark Iniseoghan
2. In a Garden so Green
3. Ar Hyd y Nos
4. Twilight Fancies
5. Nocturne
6. Down by the Salley Gardens
7. Pie Jesu (Fauré)
8. Ye Banks and Braes of Bonny Doon
9. Lisa Lân
10. En Prière
11. An Eriskay Love Lilta
12. Ave Maria (Schubert)
13. She Moved Through the Fair
14. Der Nussbaum (Robert Schumann, Myrthen, Op. 25, No. 3))
15. A Fairy's Love Song
16. We'll Keep a Welcome

Lilium (released December 2010)

1. My Little Welsh Home
2. Del Cabello Más Sutil
3. Dafydd y Garreg Wen
4. I Dreamt I Dwelt in Marble Halls
5. Cyfri'r Geifr
6. If I Were a Blackbird
7. O mio babbino caro
8. Gartan Mother's Lullaby
9. Mondnacht (Robert Schumann)
10. Lilium
11. You'll Never Walk Alone
12. Greensleeves
13. Isle of Innisfree
14. May It Be
15. It's Only a Paper Moon

Storybook Journey (released June 2012)

1. Cariad
2. Scarborough Fair
3. The Rose
4. A Ei Di'r Deryn Du
5. Walking in the Air
6. Fields of St Etienne
7. Llangollen Market
8. Siúil a Rún
9. Bring Him Home
10. Black Is the Colour
11. Nearer, My God, to Thee
12. Dream a Dream
13. Caledonia
14. Calon Lân
15. Prayer
16. Sora Wo Aruku (Walking in the Air in Japanese)
17. Storybook Journey

Entwined (released 25 April 2016)

1. First Day of the World
2. An Hini a Garan
3. In a Blue Sky
4. Ardaigh Cuan
5. Dance of the Leaves
6. Suo Gân
7. Entwined
8. The Parting Glass
9. Drums of Lochnager
10. Dacw 'Nghariad
11. Castlebar
12. Ailein duinn
13. Southern Heart
14. The Snow Goose Song
15. Auld Lang Syne

== Illustration ==
Siobhan Owen has also been involved with several book projects and gallery exhibitions showing her artwork. Books include Welsh titles The Children's Voice: A Definitive Collection of Welsh Nursery Rhymes, The Age of Saints, and Welsh in the Old West, to name a few.
