= Ar Lan y Môr =

Traditional Welsh folk song

Kenneth Bowen singing the first verse of "Ar Lan y Môr"

"Ar Lan y Môr" (Welsh for 'on the seashore') is a traditional Welsh folk love song. A single verse was published by the Welsh Folk Song Society in 1937, and again (recorded from another singer) in 1948. A slightly different version was recorded by the BBC in 1953. Extra verses have been added, mostly from the 'Hen Benillion' (Old Stanzas).

== Recordings and performances ==
The song was a favourite of Welsh actor Richard Burton and was sung by Burton and Elizabeth Taylor on the premier episode of The Sammy Davis, Jr. Show on 7 January, 1966. The performance marked the first time the controversial couple had appeared together on TV.

"Ar Lan y Môr" has been frequently recorded. Notably, the song features on the first Welsh-language concept album, Endaf Emlyn's Salem (1974). A rendition appears on the only comedy album to top the UK Albums Chart to date, Max Boyce's We All Had Doctors' Papers (1975). The song also appears on Ar Log's eponymous 1978 debut album, Bryn Terfel's album We'll Keep a Welcome (2000) and Katherine Jenkins' debut album Première (2004). Adwaith recorded a modern version of the song in 2020.

The song is often included in the Last Night of the BBC Proms.

== Words, with English translation ==
Ar lan y môr mae rhosys cochion,
Ar lan y môr mae lilis gwynion,
Ar lan y môr mae 'nghariad inne
Yn cysgu'r nos a chodi'r bore.

Ar lan y môr mae carreg wastad
Lle bûm yn siarad gair â'm cariad;
O amgylch hon fe dyf y lili
Ac ambell gangen o rosmari.

Ar lan y môr mae cerrig gleision,
Ar lan y môr mae blodau'r meibion,
Ar lan y môr mae pob rhinwedde,
Ar lan y môr mae 'nghariad inne.

Tros y môr y mae fy nghalon,
Tros y môr y mae f’ochneidion,
Tros y môr y mae f’anwylyd
Sy’n fy meddwl i bob munud.

Llawn yw'r môr o swnd a chregyn,
Llawn yw'r wy o wyn a melyn,
Llawn yw'r coed o ddail a blode,
Llawn o gariad merch wyf inne.

Translation:

On the seashore are red roses,
On the seashore are white lilies,
On the seashore is my love
Sleeping at night and rising in the morning.

On the seashore is a flat rock
Where I spoke a word with my love;
About this grows the lily
And the odd branch of rosemary.

On the seashore are blue rocks,
On the seashore are the flowers of the sons,
On the seashore are all virtues,
On the seashore is my love.

Over the sea is my heart,
Over the sea are my sighs,
Over the sea is my beloved
Who is my thought every minute.

Full is the sea of sand and shells,
Full is the egg of white and yellow,
Full are the trees of leaves and flowers,
Full of a girl's love am I myself.

== Melodies ==
1. CAGC (1937) 3 p.125

2. CAGC (1937) 3 p.126

3. Folksongs of Britain and Ireland (1975) p.137
