= NEB =

Neb or NEB may refer to:

== Organizations ==
- National Enterprise Board, a UK government body from 1975 to 1981
- National Energy Board, a Canadian independent federal agency from 1959 to 2018
- National Examination Board (Nepal), organizes the Higher Secondary examination in Nepal

== Companies ==
- New England Biolabs, U.S. corporation, produces and supplies reagents for the life science industry
- Niederbarnimer Eisenbahn, a train company in Germany
- Nuclear Energy Board, an Irish government agency from 1973 to 1992

== Science and technology ==
- North Equatorial belt, a Cloud pattern on Jupiter
- Noise Equivalent Bandwidth, a measure of the bandwidth of an electrical filter
- Nudged Elastic Band, a way of exploring reaction paths in computational chemistry
- N-Ethylbuphedrone, a stimulant
- Nebulin, a large protein encoded by the gene NEB and found in muscles

== Entertainment ==
- Neb (or Nebuchadnezzar), a character in the novel Castaways of the Flying Dutchman by Brian Jacques
- Neb (or Nebuchadnezzar), a character in English translations of the novel Mysterious Island by Jules Verne (in the original French the names are Nab and Nabuchadnasar)
- Neb (or Nebuchadnezzar), the name of the ship the main character pilot through Zion, in the film trilogy 'The Matrix'.

== Places ==
- River Neb, one of the principal rivers on the Isle of Man

== Other uses ==
- Neb, transcription of an ancient Egyptian hieroglyph of a basket, Gardiner sign V30
- Neb, the pen name of British political cartoonist Ronald Niebour (1903–1972)
- Nose in Everyone's Business, a busybody or gossip
- New English Bible, a translation of the Bible, first published as a complete edition in 1970
