= We All Had Doctors' Papers =

Live album by Max Boyce
- Released: 1975
- Recorded: Pontarddulais RFC
- Genre: Comedy, folk
- Language: English, Welsh
- Label: EMI; MB 101

Max Boyce chronology
Live at Treorchy (1974)	We All Had Doctors' Papers (1975)	The Incredible Plan (1976)

We All Had Doctors' Papers is a live album by Welsh comedian and singer Max Boyce, first issued in 1975 and recorded at Pontarddulais Rugby Club. It was his fourth album release and followed his breakthrough recording Live at Treorchy. The album contains a mixture of comedic and traditional songs, along with Boyce's interactions with the crowd. Two songs on the album, "Sosban Fach" and "Ar Lan y Môr", are in the Welsh language. It is the only comedy album to have topped the UK albums chart.

== Album ==
We All Had Doctors' Papers is a live recording similar to Boyce's recording of the previous year Live at Treorchy. Just as Live at Treorchy was recorded at the town's local rugby club, Boyce continued his connection with the sport of rugby union by recording We All Had Doctors' Papers at Pontarddulais Rugby Club. The album was recorded in one take over one night. The album title comes from the song "9-3" which appeared on Live at Treorchy. Celebrating Llanelli RFC's 1972 win over New Zealand, the lyrics of the fourth verse follow; "But we all had doctors' papers, and they all said just the same, that we all had Scarlet Fever, and we caught it at the game".

Boyce, whose comedic songs are now linked to the sport of rugby union, included four rugby songs, "I Gave My Love a Debenture", "Deck of Cards", "The Devil's Marking Me" and "Pontypool Front Row", the last of which celebrates the Wales and British Lions trio of Graham Price, Bobby Windsor and Charlie Faulkner. Of the songs on the album "Sospan Fach" and "Ar Lan y Môr" are both traditional Welsh folk songs, while "Swansea Town" is written by Swansea songwriter and composer, John M. Davies; the rest are original works by Boyce. "I Gave My Love a Debenture" is a parody of the song commonly known as "I Gave My Love a Cherry".

The album cover and reverse is drawn by Welsh cartoonist Gren, who became the first cartoonist to receive a gold disc from the record company EMI. The cover shows a crowded and detailed rugby international match at the Cardiff Arms Park, hidden in the crowd are several notable Welsh sportspeople and celebrities, such as comedian Tommy Cooper.

== Chart history ==
We All Had Doctors' Papers was released in October 1975, and first entered the UK albums chart on 1 November at number nine. It rose the following week to number three before topping the chart on 15 November 1975 replacing Jim Reeves' 40 Golden Greats. It remained at number one for a single week, spending 17 weeks in total in the Top 40, dropping out of the chart on 17 January 1976. It was the first and only comedy album to reach the number one spot in the UK chart.

== Track listing ==
1. "Sosban Fach"
2. "I Am an Entertainer"
3. "Ticketless (I Wandered Lonely)"
4. "I Gave My Love a Debenture"
5. "Rhondda Grey"
6. "Slow, Men at Work"
7. "Deck of Cards"
8. "Swansea Town"
9. "The Devil's Marking Me"
10. "Ar Lan y Môr"
11. "Pontypool Front Row"
12. "Sosban Fach"

== Charts ==
=== Weekly charts ===
Chart (1975)	Peak position
UK Albums (OCC)	1

=== Year-end charts ===
Chart (1975)	Position
UK Albums (OCC)	31
