= We'll Keep a Welcome =

- Sheet music cover

Song
- Published: 1940
- Composer: Mai Jones
- Lyricists: Lyn Joshua, Jimmy Harper

Extract of "We'll Keep a Welcome" by the Cwmbach Male Voice Choir

"We'll Keep a Welcome" is a popular song composed by Mai Jones with lyrics by Lyn Joshua and Jimmy Harper in 1940. It was introduced in the BBC radio variety show Welsh Rarebit and remains strongly associated with Wales.

Jones joined the BBC in Cardiff as a radio producer of light entertainment. In this position, she devised Welsh Rarebit, a variety show originally broadcast on the BBC Forces Programme and intended for Welsh people serving in the armed forces during the Second World War. "We'll Keep a Welcome", with music originally written by Thomas Morgan, who sold the copyright to Jones and words by Lyn Joshua and Jimmy Harper, was written to close each edition. The song's lyric was intended to reflect the hiraeth those away from home would be experiencing. It was first performed on the programme on 29 February 1940 by the BBC's resident 25-strong male voice choir, the Lyrian Singers. After the war, Welsh Rarebit moved to the BBC Light Programme where it was the most popular show in 1949. By then, "We'll Keep a Welcome" had become "a British as well as a Welsh favourite", according to the Western Mail. Such was the song's success, when the Lyrian Singers were unavailable for a postponed Welsh Rarebit tour in 1950, their replacement was billed as "the Welcome Choir". By the 1950s, the song was sometimes referred to as "Wales' second national anthem".

The song first appeared on record in a rendition by the George Mitchell choir issued by Decca in July 1949. The Lyrian Singers version, on His Master's Voice, followed in November 1949. A recording by Harry Secombe, who had been among the performers in Welsh Rarebit, was issued by Philips Records in 1956. This version was later included on the album Harry Secombe Showcase (1959). A version by pianist Russ Conway features on his album Family Favourites (1959). A performance of the song by the Treorchy Male Voice Choir features on Transatlantic Exchange (1957), a 10-inch record issued by South Wales area of the National Union of Mineworkers. The live recordings document the miners' eisteddfod at the Grand Pavilion, Porthcawl on 5 October 1957, where Paul Robeson performed from a New York studio via the recently completed transatlantic telephone cable TAT-1. Robeson was unable to appear in-person due to his passport having been confiscated by the United States Department of State and the release served as a fundraiser and protest at his treatment. The song, with its appropriate sentiment, was dedicated to Robeson by the South Wales NUM president Will Paynter. It is the title track of a 2000 studio album by Welsh bass-baritone Bryn Terfel. The song is referenced in the Monty Python "Election Night Special" sketch. The song's title has been appropriated in various contexts, including as a slogan for Manx Airlines and as the title of a 2022 concert at the Principality Stadium featuring Welsh musical acts Stereophonics, Tom Jones and Catfish and the Bottlemen.
