= Onllwyn Brace =

Wales international rugby union footballer

- Born: David Onllwyn Brace; 16 November 1932 Gowerton, Wales
- Died: 4 July 2013 (aged 80) Cowbridge, Wales
- Height: 5 ft 6 in (1.68 m)
- Weight: 9 st 11 lb (62 kg)
- School: Gowerton Grammar School
- University: Cardiff University; Oxford University

Rugby union career
- Position: scrum-half
Amateur team(s)
Years	Team	Apps	(Points)
- Pontarddulais RFC
1951-1953	Aberavon RFC		
- Oxford University RFC
1953-1957	Newport RFC		
- Llanelli RFC
1960-1961	Barbarian F.C.		
International career
Years	Team	Apps	(Points)
1956-1961	Wales	9	(3)

David Onllwyn Brace (16 November 1932 – 4 July 2013) was a Welsh international scrum-half who played club rugby for Newport and Aberavon. He won nine caps for Wales and would captain the team twice in the early 1960s. Brace was an exciting, unorthodox scrum-half, who epitomised the Welsh flair scrum-half, though his uneven international appearances point towards unhappiness in his match play from the Welsh selectors.

== Rugby career ==
Brace played for Gowerton Grammar School before attending University College, Oxford. He played for the Oxford team in The Varsity Matches in 1955 and 1956, being credited with responsibility for the win in 1955 and defeat in 1956.

Brace played for Aberavon but moved to Newport after the club tried to play him in the unfamiliar role of outside-half to Cliff Ashton. As a Newport player, Brace was chosen to face the touring New Zealand in 1954. Brace later played for Llanelli and captained the team during two seasons 1958/59 and 1960/61. He was one of 21 former Llanelli captains to parade in front of the supporters before the final match at Llanelli's first home ground, Stradey Park.

Brace made his international debut for Wales against England on 21 January 1956 in a game at the Twickenham. Wales won the match 8–3, and Brace faced England's Mike Smith, of whom he had made an excellent half-back partnership at Oxford University. Brace would play in all four matches of the 1956 Five Nations Championship which Wales won, losing only to Ireland in the tournament. Brace played nine games for Wales, and captained the country twice, on both occasions against Ireland in 1960 and 1961.

=== International matches played ===
Wales

- England 1956, 1957
- France 1956, 1960
- Ireland 1956, 1960, 1961
- Scotland 1956, 1960

== Broadcasting career ==
Onllwyn Brace succeeded Cliff Morgan as Head of Sport at BBC Wales. After retiring from the BBC in 1989 he joined the Merlin Group as a freelance producer making sports and gardening programmes for the BBC and S4C.

== Bibliography ==
- Smith, David; Williams, Gareth (1980). Fields of Praise: The Official History of The Welsh Rugby Union. Cardiff: University of Wales Press. ISBN 0-7083-0766-3.
