= Llangollen Market =

19th-century Welsh song

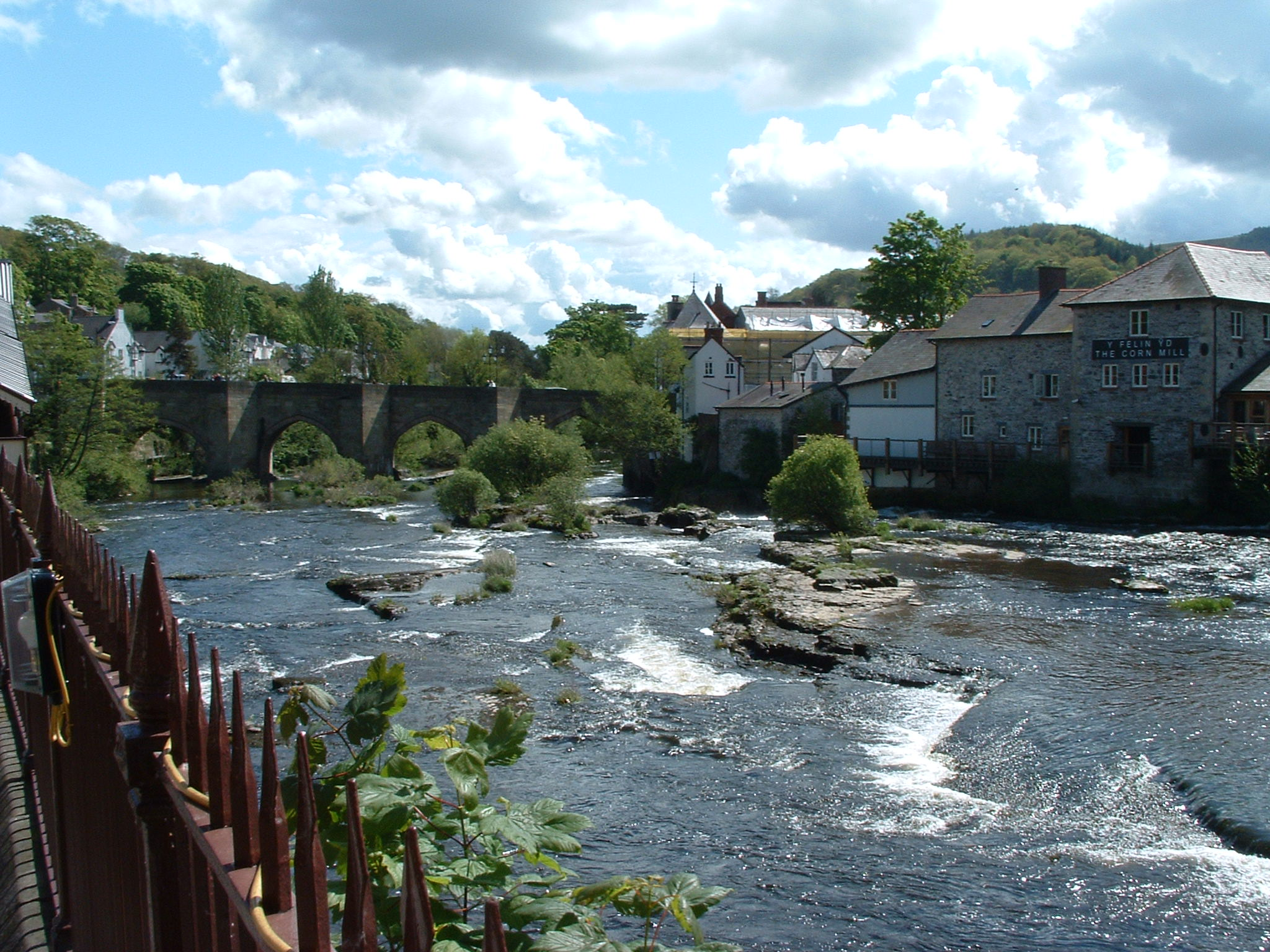
The River Dee at Llangollen.

"Llangollen Market" is a song from early 19th-century Wales. It is known to have been performed at an eisteddfod at Llangollen in 1858.

The text of the song survives in a manuscript held by the National Museum of Wales, which came into the possession of singer Mary Davies, a co-founder of the Welsh Folk-Song Society.

The song tells the tale of a young man from the Llangollen area going off to war and leaving behind his broken-hearted girlfriend. Originally written in English, the song has been translated into Welsh and recorded by several artists such as Siân James, Siobhan Owen, Calennig and Siwsann George.

== Lyrics ==
It’s far beyond the mountains that look so distant here,
To fight his country’s battles, last Mayday went my dear;
Ah, well shall I remember with bitter sighs the day,
Why, Owen, did you leave me? At home why did I stay?

Ah, cruel was my father that did my flight restrain,
And I was cruel-hearted that did at home remain,
With you, my love, contented, I’d journey far away;
Why, Owen, did you leave me? At home why did I stay?

While thinking of my Owen, my eyes with tears do fill,
And then my mother chides me because my wheel stands still,
But how can I think of spinning when my Owen’s far away;
Why, Owen, did you leave me? At home why did I stay?

To market at Llangollen each morning do I go,
But how to strike a bargain no longer do I know;
My father chides at evening, my mother all the day;
Why, Owen, did you leave me, at home why did I stay?

Oh, would it please kind heaven to shield my love from harm,
To clasp him to my bosom would every care disarm,
But alas, I fear, 'tis distant - that happy, happy day;
Why, Owen, did you leave me, at home why did stay?
