= Welsh Rarebit (radio programme) =

1940s BBC radio show

- Genre: Variety show
- Running time: 30–60 mins
- Country of origin: United Kingdom
- Language: English
- Home station: BBC Forces Programme; (1940–1943); BBC Home Service; (1941–1957); BBC Light Programme; (1948–1954)
- Starring: Eynon Evans; Lyn Joshua; Lyrian Singers
- Produced by: Glyn Jones; Mai Jones
- Recording studio: Cardiff
- Original release: 29 February 1940 – 19 January 1957
- Audio format: Monaural
- Opening theme: "They Can't Stop us Singing"
- Ending theme: "We'll Keep a Welcome"
- Website: www.bbc.co.uk/programmes/p00pn1s9

Welsh Rarebit is a British radio variety show broadcast from Cardiff by the BBC between February 1940 and December 1952. The title was taken from the dish of the same name. The show's most lasting legacy remains its closing song, "We'll Keep a Welcome".

== Programme synopsis ==
Billed as "a programme of variety and topicalities", it began life as a monthly 30-minute feature in the BBC's wartime Forces Programme, and was designed for the entertainment of armed forces personnel, in particular for those whose home was in Wales, but quickly became popular generally, and from June 1941 – when production was taken over by Mai Jones, who was also responsible for such other entertainment shows as Saturday Starlight – Welsh Rarebit also featured from time to time in the schedules of the BBC Home Service.

Although chiefly a variety show, the programme also included such regular features as Eynon Evans playing "Tommy Troubles" and Dai's Letter to the Forces, a sentimental reflection of life in Wales read by Lyn Joshua.

== Stars ==
Welsh Rarebit featured a host of Welsh entertainers, many of whom became household names; regulars included Wyn Calvin, Maudie Edwards, Eynon Evans, Vera Meazey, Gladys Morgan, Ossie Morris, Harry Secombe, Stan Stennett, Ann Walters, Albert and Les Ward. At its peak the programme attracted 12 million listeners and remains one of the most popular entertainment shows to have been produced from Wales.

== Later production ==
The wartime programmes came to an end in December 1944, but Welsh Rarebit returned on Saint David's Day 1948 in the BBC Light Programme and ran (now as an hour-long weekly show) from then until July 1951, with a final "Christmas Special" edition being broadcast in December 1952.
