= Live at Treorchy =

Live album by Max Boyce
- Released: 1974
- Recorded: 23 November 1973; Treorchy, Rhondda
- Genre: Comedy
- Label: EMI; OU 2033
- Producer: Bob Barrett

Max Boyce chronology
Caneuon Amrywiol (1971)	Live at Treorchy (1974)	We All Had Doctors' Papers (1975)

Live at Treorchy is a live album by Welsh comedian and singer Max Boyce, first issued in 1974. It was his third album and his first for a major label, EMI Records. The album contains a mixture of comedic songs and poems along with Boyce's interactions with the crowd at Treorchy Rugby Club. The album was an unexpected success going gold and was Boyce's breakthrough recording, helping make him a household name in Wales and beyond.

== Album history ==
Welsh entertainer Max Boyce had produced two albums prior to the release of Live at Treorchy, both on Cambrian Records, Max Boyce in Session and Caneuon Amrywiol (both in 1971). Neither album was very successful and Boyce continued touring clubs around South Wales. In 1973 and still an unknown outside Wales, he was spotted by EMI record producer Bob Barrett, stealing the show from headliner Ken Dodd at the Brangwyn Hall in Swansea. Boyce signed a contract with the EMI producer while walking along a bridle path at Langland Bay, and was signed to a two-record deal overseen by Vic Lanza, head of EMI Records’ MOR music division.

It was decided that the recording would be a live take of one of his dates on a pre-arranged tour, and the venue of Treorchy Rugby Club was chosen. Despite the admission fee being only 50 pence, uptake was low and an audience was rounded up by offering free entry to people in nearby pubs. Amongst the audience were members of the Treorchy Male Voice Choir, who added volume during the sing along choruses. EMI had sent a three-man unit to record the show, including Abbey Road sound engineer Phil Hancock, who set up the mixing desks in the club changing rooms. Recorded on 23 November 1973, Boyce was supported on the day by Welsh band Triban and the concert was compered by broadcaster Alun Williams, though neither appeared on the finished album. Live at Treorchy album was completed in one take on one night, with the finishing mix completed at Abbey Road Studios.

The album had a slow response on its release, but its popularity spread through word of mouth and although the album relied on Welsh humour and pathos, its content struck a chord across Britain. The success of the album allowed Boyce to give up his day job and become a professional entertainer. His follow-up album, We All Had Doctors' Papers, released in 1975, reached number one in the UK Album charts.

Welsh historian Martin Johnes describes Live at Treorchy as 'important to an understanding of Welshness as anything Dylan Thomas or Saunders Lewis wrote.'

=== "Hymns and Arias" ===
The songs on the album were mostly of a rugby theme, including "9–3" which celebrates Llanelli RFC's 1972 win over New Zealand, "The Outside Half Factory" and the song with which Boyce is now most associated, "Hymns and Arias". The chorus of "Hymns and Arias", "And we were singing/ hymns and arias/ Land of my Fathers/ Ar Hyd y Nos", has attained folk song status among Welsh rugby supporters and is often heard at Wales international matches. The song was also adopted by Welsh football fans, often heard at Swansea City and Wrexham matches.

Although "Hymns and Arias" had been released previously on his debut album Max Boyce in Session, it was Live at Treorchy which brought the song to a wider audience. The track was released the next year on 7" vinyl, but only as a promotional copy, and was not released to the general public. The song and album have become icons of Welsh popular culture.'

== Chart history ==
Live at Treorchy was released in 1974, and first entered the UK Album Charts on 5 July at number 35. Although reaching a peak position of 21 on 11 October 1975 it kept a presence in the charts for 38 weeks, making a final appearance 22 April 1978. The album went gold and although not Boyce's highest charting record it had the longest chart life. It sold over half a million copies.

== Track listing ==
All songs and poems written and composed by Max Boyce.

1. "9-3"
2. "The Scottish Trip"
3. "The Ballad of Morgan the Moon"
4. "The Outside Half Factory"
5. "Asso Asso Yogoshi"
6. "Duw It's Hard"
7. "Ten Thousand Instant Christians"
8. "Did You Understand"
9. "Hymns and Arias"

== Personnel ==
- Max Boyce: lead vocals, guitar
- Bill Southgate: piano and organ
- Alan Chesterfield: guitar
- George Fenton: guitar
- Derek Boote: bass
- Produced by Bob Barrett
- Engineered by Stuart Eltham

== Charts ==
=== Weekly charts ===
Chart (1975)	Peak position
UK Albums (OCC)	21

=== Year-end charts ===
Chart (1975)	Position
UK Albums (OCC)	25

== Certifications and sales ==
Region	Certification	Certified units/sales
United Kingdom (BPI)	Gold	100,000^{^}
^{^} Shipments figures based on certification alone.
