= Sospan Dau =

History
- Name: Sospan Dau ("Saucepan Two")
- Namesake: Sosban Fach ("Little Saucepan")
- Owner: Sosban BV
- Operator: Boskalis Westminster
- Port of registry: Papendrecht, Netherlands
- Builder: Atelières et Chantiers de la Manche, France
- Laid down: 1978
- In service: Converted to TSHD in 2001; Rebuilt in 2012
- Identification: Call sign: PBAL; IMO number: 7711062; MMSI number: 244990000
- Status: In service

General characteristics
- Tonnage: 1,850 GT
- Length: 72.80 m (239 ft)
- Beam: 14.30 m (47 ft)
- Draught: 2.80 m (9 ft) (summer); 3.30 m (11 ft) (dredging)
- Depth: 3.80 m (12 ft)
- Decks: 4
- Installed power: 3,200 kW (4,300 hp)
- Propulsion: Caterpillar Main Engines x 2
- Speed: 8.5 kn @ 750 rev/min
- Capacity: 1500 m3
- Crew: 8

The TSHD Sospan Dau is a Dutch trailing suction hopper dredger owned by Sosban BV. The vessel has worked on dredging projects, including offshore aggregates, port maintenance, land reclamation, coastal defense and beach replenishment. The name Sospan Dau is Welsh and originates from Sosban Fach and Llanelli's tin plating industry, Sospan being the Welsh for Saucepan and Dau being Welsh for Two as the ship is a successor to the original Sospan.

== Equipment ==
The ship has a traditional twin propeller stern and bow thruster for manoeuvering and like most trailing dredgers, includes bottom doors for dumping, a dredge engine, a jet water engine, a degassing installation, a suction pipe and associated pipelines and valves. Unique to most dredgers however, is a very large bulbous bow and spud pole for more efficient use of the dredge pump and heading/position keeping during beaching.

== Projects ==
In 2014 & 2015 the Sospan Dau created the Cowes Harbour breakwater.
