= Suo Gân =

Traditional Welsh lullaby

"Suo Gân"
Sung by Susan Bullock (opening 30 seconds)

"Suo Gân" (Welsh pronunciation: [sɨɔ ɡaːn]) is a traditional Welsh lullaby by an anonymous composer.

It was first recorded in print around 1800 and the lyrics were notably captured by the Welsh folklorist Robert Bryan (1858–1920). The song's title simply means lullaby (suo = lull; cân = song).

== Lyrics ==
Welsh
Huna blentyn ar fy mynwes,
Clyd a chynnes ydyw hon;
Breichiau mam sy'n dynn amdanat,
Cariad mam sy dan fy mron;
Ni chaiff dim amharu'th gyntun,
Ni wna undyn â thi gam;
Huna'n dawel, annwyl blentyn,
Huna'n fwyn ar fron dy fam.

Huna'n dawel, heno, huna,
Huna'n fwyn, y tlws ei lun;
Pam yr wyt yn awr yn gwenu,
Gwenu'n dirion yn dy hun?
Ai angylion fry sy'n gwenu,
Arnat ti yn gwenu'n llon,
Tithau'n gwenu'n ôl dan huno,
Huno'n dawel ar fy mron?

Paid ag ofni, dim ond deilen
Gura, gura ar y ddôr;
Paid ag ofni, ton fach unig
Sua, sua ar lan y môr;
Huna blentyn, nid oes yma
Ddim i roddi iti fraw;
Gwena'n dawel yn fy mynwes.
Ar yr engyl gwynion draw.

Translation
Sleep child upon my bosom,
It is cosy and warm;
Mother's arms are tight around you,
A mother's love is in my breast;
Nothing shall disturb your slumber,
Nobody will do you harm;
Sleep in peace, dear child,
Sleep quietly on your mother's breast.

Sleep peacefully tonight, sleep;
Gently sleep, my lovely;
Why are you now smiling,
Smiling gently in your sleep?
Are angels above smiling on you,
As you smile cheerfully,
Smiling back and sleeping,
Sleeping quietly on my breast?

Do not fear, it is nothing but a leaf
Beating, beating on the door;
Do not fear, only a small wave
Murmurs, murmurs on the seashore;
Sleep child, there's nothing here
Nothing to give you fright;
Smile quietly in my bosom,
On the blessed angels yonder.

Poetic translation
Sleep my darling, on my bosom,
Harm will never come to you;
Mother's arms enfold you safely,
Mother's heart is ever true.
As you sleep there's naught to scare you,
Naught to wake you from your rest;
Close those eyelids, little angel,
Sleep upon your mother's breast.

Sleep, my darling, night is falling
Rest in slumber sound and deep;
I would know why you are smiling,
Smiling sweetly as you sleep!
Do you see the angels smiling
As they see your rosy rest,
So that you must smile an answer
As you slumber on my breast?

Don't be frightened, it's a leaflet
Tapping, tapping on the door;
Don't be frightened, 'twas a wavelet
Sighing, sighing on the shore.
Slumber, slumber, naught can hurt you,
Nothing bring you harm or fright;
Slumber, darling, smiling sweetly
At those angels robed in white.

== Other uses of the tune ==
The tune is used for several hymns, including:

- "As the Winter Days Grow Longer"
- "Christ Before Us"
- "Christ Has Risen While Earth Slumbers"
- "Now the Heavens Start to Whisper"

The American edition of the Orff Schulwerk book Music for Children sets a carol to the tune of "Suo Gân", with the following verses:

Suogân, do not weep,
Suogân, go to sleep;
Suogân, mother's near,
Suogân, have no fear.

Suogân, Eastern Star,
Suogân, from afar;
Suogân, shepherds sing,
Suogân, newborn King.

Suogân, from above,
Suogân, song of love;
Suogân, blessed morn,
Suogân, Christ is born.

== In popular culture ==
- An orchestral arrangement by George Weldon is included in the 1979 Classics for Pleasure album "Encores You Love", played by The Hallé orchestra, conducted by Maurice Handford.
- "Suo Gân", as performed by James Rainbird and the Ambrosian Junior Choir directed by John McCarthy, is featured prominently in Steven Spielberg's 1987 film Empire of the Sun, where it is lip-synched by a young Christian Bale. It also appears, instrumentally, in the beginning of the 1991 film Dutch.
- The rock band Savatage used the song as a base for their song "Heal My Soul" on the 1991 album Streets: A Rock Opera.
- Kathleen Battle performed this song with guitarist Christopher Parkening on their 1996 holiday album Angels' Glory.
- "Suo Gân" is sung by the Welsh soprano Charlotte Church on her 1998 album Voice of an Angel.
- It is on The Irish Tenors' 1999 album Home for Christmas.
- Welsh bass-baritone Bryn Terfel has performed this song in several of his Christmas concerts, most notably with the Tabernacle Choir at Temple Square and on his 2000 album We'll Keep a Welcome.
- The men's choir Chanticleer covered the song for their 2001 album Christmas with Chanticleer (featuring Dawn Upshaw).
- Isobel Cooper (Izzy) performed this song on her 2002 album New Dawn.
- The Vienna Boys' Choir feature" Suo Gân" (entitled "Suo-Gan") on their 2003 The Christmas Album.
- The Fron Male Voice Choir sing their arrangement on their 2007 Voices of the Valley Encore album.
- The pipes and drums of the Royal Scots Dragoon Guards covered the song for their 2007 album Spirit of the Glen.
- Welsh-born Australian Siobhán Owen recorded "Suo Gân" on her 2008 album Purely Celtic and on her 2016 album Entwined.
- It is featured in the last episode of the anime Black Butler season 2 (2014), where it is sung by the demon maid Hannah Annafellows to the show's protagonist, Ciel Phantomhive.
- Composer Gareth Lumb arranged a version "Suo Gân" for use as the "counter song" in the 2020 horror video game Maid of Sker, released by Wales Interactive.
- An arrangement by Carly Paradis, sung by Welsh treble Cai Thomas, was used as a motif and in the credits sequence of the 2021 British drama The Pembrokeshire Murders, based on the real-life Pembrokeshire murders by Welsh serial killer John Cooper.
