= Pontarddulais RFC =

Welsh rugby union club, based in Pontarddulais

(Wales) Pontarddulais RFC
- Full name: Pontarddulais Rugby Football Club
- Nickname(s): The Black & Ambers
- Founded: 1881; 145 years ago
- Location: Pontarddulais, Wales
- Ground: Coedbach Park
- CEO: Huw Thomas
- President: Ben Francis
- Director of Rugby: Kevin George
- Coach(es): Jacob Miles, Josh Goss
- Captain: Jacob Miles
- Top scorer: James Davies 338 points in season 2000-2001 and also most points in a 1st xv match 38 points (Sat 28 April 2001, 1st xv v Pembroke at Coedbach Park)
- League: WRU Division Two West
- 2025-2026: 2nd WRU Division One West
Team kit

Largest win
- Pontarddulais 132 - Llandeilo 0 (Sat 11 April 2015)

Official website
- www.pontarddulais-rfc.co.uk

Pontarddulais Rugby Football Club is a rugby union team from the town of Pontarddulais in Wales, UK. The club is a member of the Welsh Rugby Union and is a feeder club for the Ospreys.

The club is famous as the location for the recording in 1975 of We All Had Doctors' Papers, a live album by Welsh comedian and singer Max Boyce, the only comedy album ever to top the UK album charts.

Although rugby had been played in Pontarddulais before the club's formation, it was not until 22 September 1881 that the local inhabitants decided on creating an official rugby club. The fact that Pontarddulais have a formation date is fairly uncommon if not unique in Welsh rugby union clubs formed before World War I; as most other teams did not record the event. In the early 1890s the team played in a green strip but had changed to their present black and amber by the turn of the century. The club plays at Coed Bach park in Pontarddulais.

== Club honours ==
=== Welsh Rugby Union competitions ===
- WRU Division Seven West 1999/2000 - Champions
- WRU Division Six West 2000/01 - Champions
- WRU Division Four West 2005/06 - Champions
- WRU Division Two West 2022/23 - Champions

=== West Wales Rugby Union competitions ===
- The Presidents All Winners Cup: 1963–64, 1964–65, 1965–66, 1966–67
- The Challenge Cup: 1963–64, 1964–65, 1965–66, 1966–67
- Championship Shield: 1963–64, 1968–69
- Championship Cup: 1966–67, 1967–68
- Union Eurof Davies Memorial Cup: 1962–63, 1963–64, 1965–66, 1966–67, 1967–68, 1968–69
- Union District 'F' Sevens: 1986–87
- Union Welsh Brewers Bowl: 1989–90

=== Glamorgan County competitions ===
- Glamorgan County Silver Ball HB Trophy: 1999–2000

=== West Wales Rugby Union Competitions ===
- The Presidents Cup: 1967–68, 1973–74
- The Championship Shield: 1967–68, 1973–74
- The Challenge Cup: 1964–65, 1968–69, 1973–74
- Section A Winners: 1980–81
- Section C Winners: 1988–89, 1990–91, 1992–93
- Section D Winners: 1977–78
- Union Alcoa Cup: 1977–78

=== Youth competition ===
- Dyffryn Llwchwr Youth Rugby Union The Championship Cup 1958–59, 1959–60, 1960–61, 1961–62, 1962–63, 1967–68, 1968–69, 1972–73, 1974–75, 1975–76, 1983–84, 1984–85, 1985–86, 1986–87, 1987–88, 1988–89, 1992–93, 1993–94
- Dyffryn Llwchwr Youth Rugby Union Gwyn Williams Memorial Trophy 1967–68, 1968–69, 1972–73, 1973–74, 1975–76, 1983–84, 1984–85, 1985–86, 1986–87, 1987–88, 1992–93, 1993–94, 1999–00
- Dyffryn Llwchwr Youth Rugby Union Loughor Valley Sevens 1974–75, 1979–80, 1983–84, 1984–85, 1986–87, 1987–88, 1994–95
- Dyffryn Llwchwr Youth Rugby Union Dudley Williams Memorial Cup 1982–83, 1983–84, 1984–85, 1993–94
- Swansea & District Junior Rugby Union Swansea Super 12's (Under 11's) Winners 2007–08

== Notable former players ==
- (Wales) David Onllwyn Brace (9 caps). 1956 - 1961.
- (Wales) David Idwal Davies (1 cap). 1939.
- (Wales) William Dillwyn Johnson (1 cap). 1953.
- (England) Arthur Vaughan-Jones (3 Caps). 1932 - 1933.
- (Wales) Derwyn Jones (19 caps). 1994 - 1996.
- (Wales) James Lang (12 caps). 1931 - 1937.
- (Wales) Gareth John Roberts (7 caps). 1985 - 1987.
- (Wales) David John Thomas (10 caps). 1904 - 1912.
- (Wales) Darril John Williams (1 cap). 1998.
