= The Wild Affair =

1965 British film by John Krish

- Theatrical poster
- Directed by: John Krish
- Written by: John Krish
- Based on: The Last Hours of Sandra Lee (novel) by William Sansom
- Produced by: William Kirby; Richard L. Patterson
- Starring: Nancy Kwan; Terry-Thomas; Jimmy Logan; Gladys Morgan
- Cinematography: Arthur Ibbetson
- Edited by: Russell Lloyd; Norman Savage
- Music by: Martin Slavin
- Distributed by: Bryanston Films; British Lion Films
- Release date: 7 November 1965 (UK)
- Running time: 88 minutes
- Country: United Kingdom
- Language: English

The Wild Affair is a 1965 British comedy film written and directed by John Krish and starring Nancy Kwan, Terry-Thomas, Jimmy Logan, Gladys Morgan, and Betty Marsden. It was adapted from the 1961 novel The Last Hours of Sandra Lee by William Sansom. Filmed in 1963, the film's release was delayed, finally opening in cinemas nationwide on 7 November 1965. The film went on to open in London cinemas from 28 November 1965.

== Plot ==
A few days before her wedding, secretary Marjorie Lee decides she wants to experience more of life before settling into married life. On her last day working at a large cosmetics firm, which happens to be the day of the office Christmas party, she arrives in a provocatively frilly dress. Her appearance catches the attention of several male colleagues, including her lecherous boss Godfrey Deane and a visiting sales manager named Craig, who invites her to lunch. Deane's secretary, Monica, becomes noticeably upset by his interest in Marjorie.

After having the company's new "Vampire Look" make-up tested on her by a colleague named Quentin, Marjorie allows Craig to buy her a new dress and joins him for lunch at his hotel suite. When he makes advances, she panics and flees. Returning to the office, she uses her Christmas bonus to purchase liquor to make the party more exciting than the modest gathering Deane had planned. When her fiancé Andy arrives to pick her up, Marjorie tells him she intends to enjoy her remaining time as a single woman and sends him away.

As the evening progresses, the party becomes increasingly wild and sexual in nature. Marjorie, now disgusted by the scene, activates the ceiling's fire sprinkler system, drenching everyone. The group's drunken anger quickly shifts to celebration when a phone call arrives with news that Ralph, one of the employees, has just become a father. The party breaks up, and Marjorie finds Andy waiting for her, and they reconcile.

== Cast ==
- Nancy Kwan as Marjorie Lee
- Terry-Thomas as Godfrey Deane
- Jimmy Logan as Craig
- Bud Flanagan as Sergeant Bletch
- Gladys Morgan as Mrs. Tovey
- Paul Whitsun-Jones as Tiny Hearst
- Betty Marsden as Mavis Cook
- Donald Churchill as Andy
- Victor Spinetti as Quentin
- Joyce Blair as Monica
- David Sumner as Ralph
- Diane Aubrey as Jill
- Bessie Love as Marjorie's mother
- Joan Benham as assistant
- Frank Finlay as drunk
- Frank Thornton as manager

== Production ==
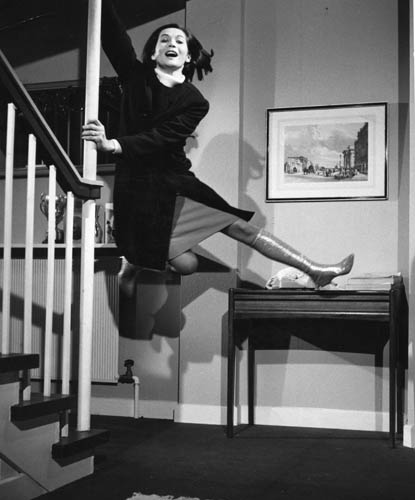
Nancy Kwan in The Wild Affair

In 1963, Nancy Kwan's long hair, famous from The World of Suzie Wong (1960), was chopped into a sharp modernist bob by Vidal Sassoon for the film The Wild Affair, at the request of director John Krish. The image of her new hairstyle was published in the October editions of both American and British Vogue. Vidal's new hairstyle was previously called the "Mary Quant cut", as it had first featured in her fashion show, but became known as the "Nancy Kwan cut".

== Critical reception ==
The film received mixed reviews, with several reviewers criticizing the film's failure to deliver on its risqué premise. The Radio Times Guide to Films found that "the affair is not as wild as it pretends to be" and VideoHound's Golden Movie Retriever called it "more silly than sexy." Radio Times awarded the film 3 out of 5 stars, and critic Leslie Halliwell acknowledged "interesting elements" despite the film's flaws.

Several reviewers questioned the casting of Nancy Kwan, whom Halliwell found "attractive but miscast" and Radio Times felt "was not the best choice for the lead"; The Monthly Film Bulletin remarked that her "daring" dress "looks just about right for a children's picnic." The supporting cast received praise, including "a wealth of comedy talent" and "some giants of the British music-hall (Bud Flanagan, Jimmy Logan, Gladys Morgan)," as well as Betty Marsden's "good performance."
