= Wyn Calvin =

Welsh comedian (1925–2022)

Wyn Calvin MBE OStJ
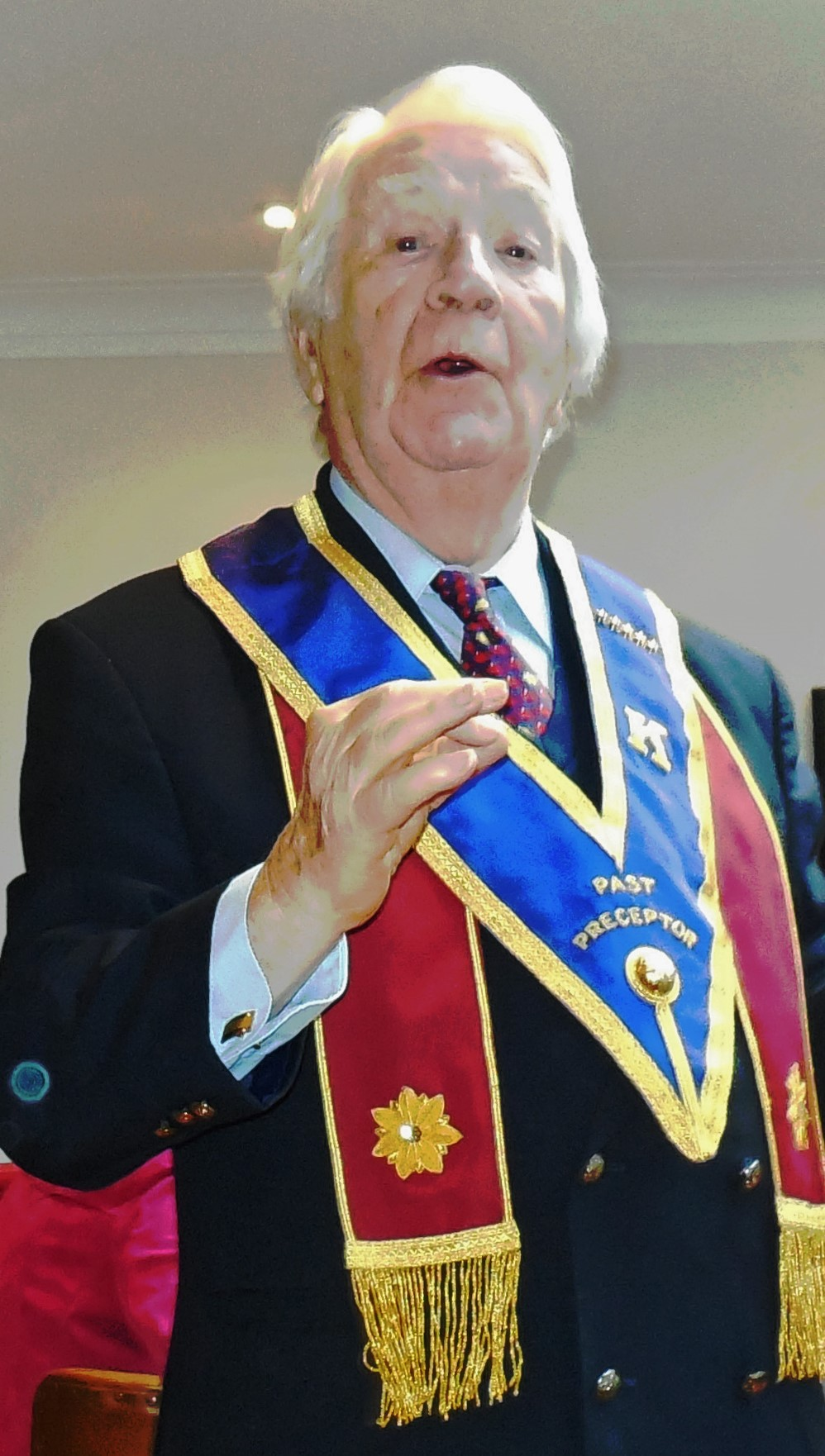
- Calvin at the Grand Order of Water Rats in 2014
- Born: Joseph Wyndham Calvin-Thomas; 28 August 1925; Narberth, Pembrokeshire, Wales
- Died: 25 January 2022 (aged 96)
- Occupations: Comedian, entertainer, actor, broadcaster

Wyn Calvin MBE OStJ (born Joseph Wyndham Calvin-Thomas; 28 August 1925 – 25 January 2022), known affectionately as "The Clown Prince of Wales" and "The Welsh Prince of Laughter", was a Welsh comedian, pantomime dame, television and theatre actor, radio personality, television chat show host, after-dinner speaker, lecturer, philanthropist and newspaper columnist. He worked with numerous stars within the entertainment industry including Harry Secombe, Bob Hope, Christopher Biggins, Shirley Bassey, Frankie Vaughan, Vic Morrow, Bud Flanagan, Roy Hudd, Max Boyce, Morecambe and Wise and Ken Dodd.

== Life and career ==
Born in Narberth, Pembrokeshire, he was the seventh of eight children in the Calvin-Thomas family. At the age of four, the family left for Cardiff. His father John Calvin-Thomas felt there would be a better chance of employment there. Calvin was a pupil of Kitchener Road School and Radnor Road School before attending Canton High School for Boys in Cardiff. In 1944 he was called up and enlisted in the Royal Army Service Corps aged 17. He collapsed during training and, when a heart condition was diagnosed, was invalided out.

Having left the army, he went straight into entertainment, breaking the family tradition of producing Presbyterian preachers. He auditioned at the Theatre Royal, Drury Lane, for he served with ENSA (Entertainments National Service Association), the forces entertainment service during World War II. With war still raging he toured camps in Britain and a few weeks later, on 14 May, six days after fighting in Europe ended, his troupe sailed to France to entertain allied soldiers in newly liberated France, Belgium, the Netherlands and Germany.

After leaving ENSA he spent five years in repertory theatre touring Great Britain, and found his forte as a comedian. His first big break on stage came in the 1960s in the guise of Humpty Dumpty in a part written for Sir Harry Secombe who performed it at the London Palladium. Wyn took the show on the road from London to Manchester.

As a comedy performer he appeared in variety theatres around the country including summer shows (seven in Llandudno and four in Blackpool where he was referred to as "Blackpool's favourite Welsh comedian"). He was particularly well known for pantomime. Appearing annually in over 50 pantomimes, he achieved the status of one of Britain's premier pantomime dames especially renowned as a classic Widow Twankey in Aladdin which he played until 2011. Prior to Ian McKellen playing the role in an Old Vic production (2004 and 2005), he contacted Calvin for guidance.

He broke into radio in the 1950s as Tommy Trotter in the radio show Welsh Rarebit on BBC Wales. He appeared on the BBC Light Programme's Workers’ Playtime on 47 separate occasions from 1951 to 1964 and on Midday Music Hall on 13 occasions from 1953 to 1964 as well as many other programmes. He was a columnist in the Western Mail for many years.

He supported many charities. In 1991 he became the first Welshman ever to be elected King Rat of the Grand Order of Water Rats, a show business fraternity and charity, and was also the Welsh chairman of the Variety Club of Great Britain, executive member of The Royal Variety Charity and supported the Cerebral Palsy charity. Calvin-Thomas was appointed Member of the Order of the British Empire (MBE) for charitable services in the 1989 Birthday Honours and the Officer of the Order of Saint John (OStJ) in 1993.

An accomplished after-dinner speaker, he spoke at St. David's Day events all over the world. He lectured on the subject 'Laughter - The Antidote to Stress'. He appeared in Malaysia, Jakarta and Vietnam in the Far East and many American states in the West.

In 1994, he was awarded a Fellowship of the Royal Welsh College of Music and Drama. He became Vice President of both the British Music Hall Society and the Max Miller Appreciation Society.

== Personal life and death ==
Calvin was a founding member and trustee of the Noah's Ark Children's Hospital Charity. He married Carole Calvin, a former dancer from Tenby, in 1985. At a special event in 2021, he celebrated 75 years in show business.

Calvin was also President of Narberth Civic Week and was a regular supporter of the event in his home town.

He died on 25 January 2022, at the age of 96.
