= Ar Hyd y Nos =

Welsh song

"Ar Hyd y Nos" (English: All Through the Night) is a Welsh song sung to a tune that was first recorded in Edward Jones (Bardd y Brenin)' Musical and Poetical Relics of the Welsh Bards (1784). The most commonly sung Welsh lyrics were written by John Ceiriog Hughes (1832–1887), and have been translated into several languages, including English (most famously by Harold Boulton (1859–1935)) and Breton. One of the earliest English versions, to different Welsh lyrics by one John Jones, was by Thomas Oliphant in 1862.

The melody is also used in the hymns “God That Madest Earth and Heaven” (text by Reginald Heber, 1821), "For the Fruits of His Creation" (text by Fred Pratt Green, 1970), "Go My Children with My Blessing” (text by Jaroslav Vajda, 1983) and "Father in Your Love Enfold Us".

The song is highly popular with traditional Welsh male voice choirs, and is sung by them at festivals in Wales and around the world.

The song is also sometimes considered a Christmas carol, and as such has been performed by many artists on Christmas albums, including Olivia Newton-John and Michael McDonald, who sang it as a duet on Newton-John's 2007 album Christmas Wish. Cerys Matthews sang it solo on her 2010 album Tir.

== Lyrics ==
Welsh Holl amrantau'r sêr ddywedant Ar hyd y nos "Dyma'r ffordd i fro gogoniant," Ar hyd y nos. Golau arall yw tywyllwch I arddangos gwir brydferthwch Teulu'r nefoedd mewn tawelwch Ar hyd y nos. Hyd y nos. O mor siriol, gwena'r seren Ar hyd y nos I oleuo'i chwaer ddaearen Ar hyd y nos. Nos yw henaint pan ddaw cystudd Ond i harddu dyn a'i hwyrddydd Rhown ein golau gwan i'n gilydd Ar hyd y nos. Hyd y nos.	Translation All the stars' twinkles say All through the night "This is the way to the realm of glory," All through the night. Other light is darkness To show true beauty The Heavenly family in peace All through the night. Through the night. O, how cheerful smiles the star, All through the night To light its earthly sister All through the night. Old age is night when affliction comes But to beautify man in his late days We'll put our weak light together All through the night. Through the night.

Singable English lyrics to the same tune were written by Sir Harold Boulton in 1884:

Sleep my child and peace attend thee,
All through the night
Guardian angels God will send thee,
All through the night
Soft the drowsy hours are creeping
Hill and vale in slumber sleeping,
I my loving vigil keeping
All through the night.

While the moon her watch is keeping
All through the night
While the weary world is sleeping
All through the night
O'er thy spirit gently stealing
Visions of delight revealing
Breathes a pure and holy feeling
All through the night.

=== Variations ===
There is evidence that the song has undergone the folk process to some degree, yielding several similar but modified versions. In one alternative version, the second verse is replaced with:

Angels watching ever round thee
All through the night
In thy slumbers close surround thee
All through the night
They will of all fears disarm thee,
No forebodings should alarm thee,
They will let no peril harm thee
All through the night.

Another alternative version features a night song text:

Deep the silence 'round us spreading
all through the night.
Dark the path that we are treading
all through the night.
Still the coming day discerning
by the hope within us burning.
To the dawn our footsteps turning
all through the night.

Star of faith the dark adorning
all through the night.
Leads us fearless t'wards the morning
all through the night.
Though our hearts be wrapt in sorrow,
from the hope of dawn we borrow
promise of a glad tomorrow
all through the night.

Yet another alternative version of the second verse is as follows:

You my child a babe of wonder
All through the night
Dreams you dream can't break from thunder
All through the night
Through your dreams you're gently healing
Visions of delight revealing
Slumber time is so appealing
All through the night

A. G. Prys-Jones wrote a more literal but still singable and rhyming version:

Ev'ry star in heaven is singing
All through the night,
Hear the glorious music ringing
All through the night.
Songs of sweet ethereal lightness
Wrought in realms of peace and whiteness;
See, the dark gives way to brightness
All through the night.

Look, my love, the stars are smiling
All through the night.
Lighting, soothing and beguiling
Earth's sombre plight:
So, when age brings grief and sorrow,
From each other we can borrow
Faith in our sublime tomorrow,
All through the night.

The tune is also used in the hymn "For the Fruit of All Creation" by Fred Pratt Green. The first verse of Green's lyrics (used widely in the harvest season and at Thanksgiving) ends with these words: "For the plowing, sowing, reaping, silent growth while we are sleeping, / Future needs in earth's safekeeping, thanks be to God."

In 1835, William Walker compiled and published the shape note hymn and tune book The Southern Harmony, which included the song "Welch" (page 109), using the tune for "Ar Hyd y Nos". The lyrics include the repeated phrase "O! how he loves!" Both the tune and the lyrics are unattributed.

== In popular culture ==
=== In music ===
- Joseph Haydn wrote a collection of Welsh folk songs for George Thomson (1757–1851) one of which is based on Ar hyd y nos (The Live Long Night)
- Ferdinand Ries used the tune and variations upon it in Ouverture bardique (WoO 24, 1815).
- English composer Cyril Scott used the tune for the first of his three British Melodies for piano (1912).
- The doo-wop group The Mystics, in the line-up that included Paul Simon (then recording as Jerry Landis) had a hit with a sped-up version.
- Peter, Paul and Mary sing a version on their children's album Peter, Paul and Mommy.
- Tom Chapin sings a version on his 1990 album Mother Earth.
- The chorus of Max Boyce's song "Hymns and Arias", frequently sung by fans of the Wales rugby union team, mentions "Ar Hyd y Nos": "And we were singing hymns and arias; 'Land of my Fathers', 'Ar hyd y nos'".
- Alan Stivell sings the song in Breton, Welsh and English on his 23rd album Emerald.
- The Kingston Trio sing a version on their holiday album The Last Month of the Year.
- Nana Mouskouri sings both Welsh and English versions on her 1974 album Nana's Book of Songs.

=== In film ===
- The film Knowing, starring Nicolas Cage, features his character's wife singing the English version of the song to their child.
- An a cappella version of the song occurs very briefly at the end of the Vulcan/Volcano scene in Terry Gilliam's film, The Adventures of Baron Munchausen, (1988) as Vulcan kisses Venus. It is assumed that the Cyclopes/miners are the singers.
- Carter Burwell's soundtrack to the film, The General's Daughter, features a version of the tune played on a glockenspiel.
- In the 1945 film version of Emlyn Williams' The Corn Is Green, the children in the school are taught the English version.
- In the 1949 British Ealing comedy film, A Run for Your Money, starring Donald Houston, the song is sung at the Amateur Night performance and also heard as a theme on the train journey home.
- The song is used in the 1940 film The Proud Valley, starring Paul Robeson.

=== In television ===
- The TV movie A Child's Christmas in Wales features the family singing the song towards the end of the film, but in English.
- In season 3 of the series Angel, the character Daniel Holtz is frequently heard singing the English version of this song.
- In the episode "Thursday's Child" in season 5 of Road to Avonlea, Alec King (played by Cedric Smith) sings the English version of this song to his son Daniel. However, the lullaby applies to everyone else awake in the household, given the recent bout of tuberculosis in the youngest daughter, Cecily, which has thrown the family into crisis.
- In Season 1, Episode 3 "Denial, Anger, Acceptance" of HBO's popular television show The Sopranos, Meadow Soprano and her choir sing the English version of the song, intercut with the mock execution of Christopher Moltisanti, and the real execution of Brendan Filone.
- In Series Two, Episode 26 of Monty Python's Flying Circus, the first two lines of the Welsh version are heard as an opening to a sketch about Welsh coal miners.
- In Season Three, Episode 14 of Shining Time Station, Stacy Forgets Her Name, Grace and Rex in the Jukebox Band sing the first section of their lullaby medley to help Stacy Jones who has lost her memory.
- In season 2, episode 4 of the American television series The Alienist, nurse Libby Hatch is humming the melody as she is seen lying next to the Matron she just killed.

=== In video games ===
- The 1985 edition of the Minnesota Educational Computing Consortium/Cooperative (MECC) video game The Oregon Trail features the melody as background music accompanying its display of visual scenery associated with the trail's Green River crossing.
- Chapter IV of the 2015 video game The Order: 1886 features the Sir Harold Boulton lyrics of the folk song on a collectible wax cylinder in the psychiatric ward of the Royal London Hospital.

== Sheet music gallery ==
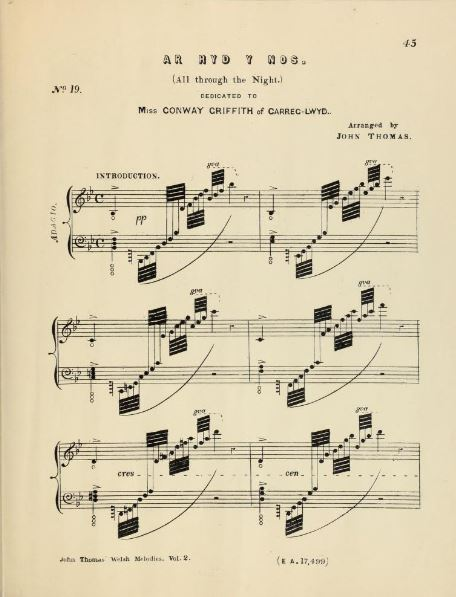
Page 1 Ar Hyd y Nos in Welsh Melodies for the Harp by John Thomas

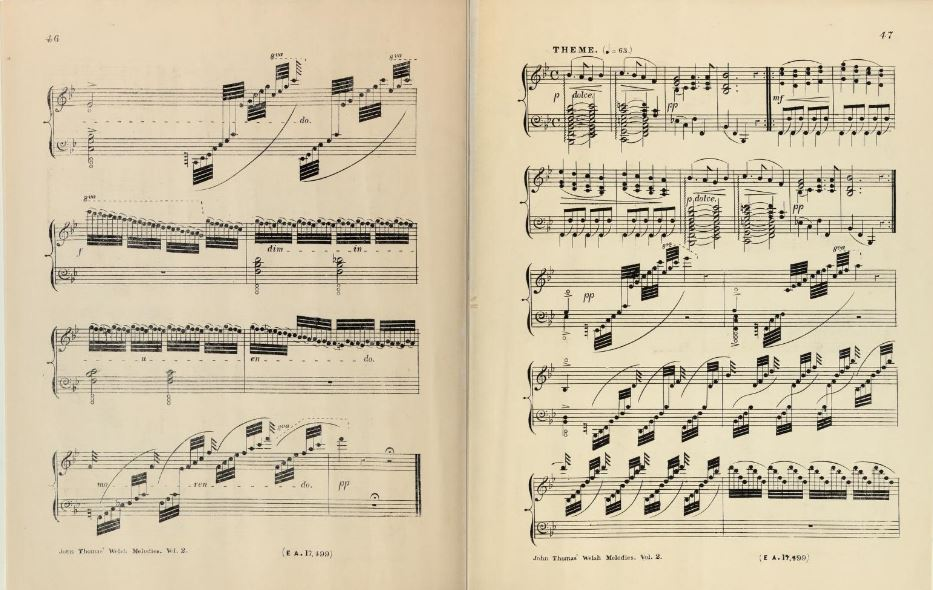
Pages 2–3 Ar Hyd y Nos in Welsh Melodies for the Harp by John Thomas

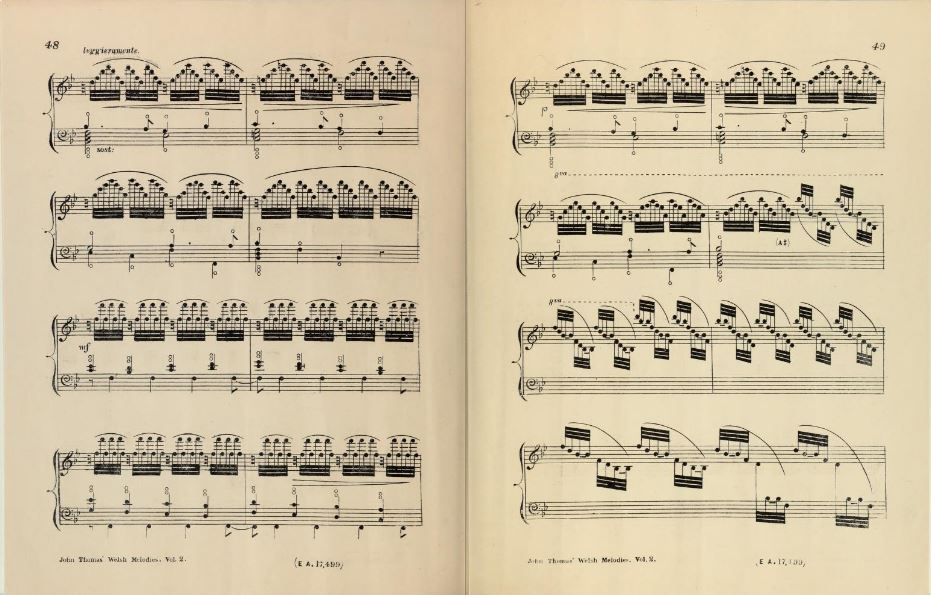
Pages 4–5 Ar Hyd y Nos in Welsh Melodies for the Harp by John Thomas

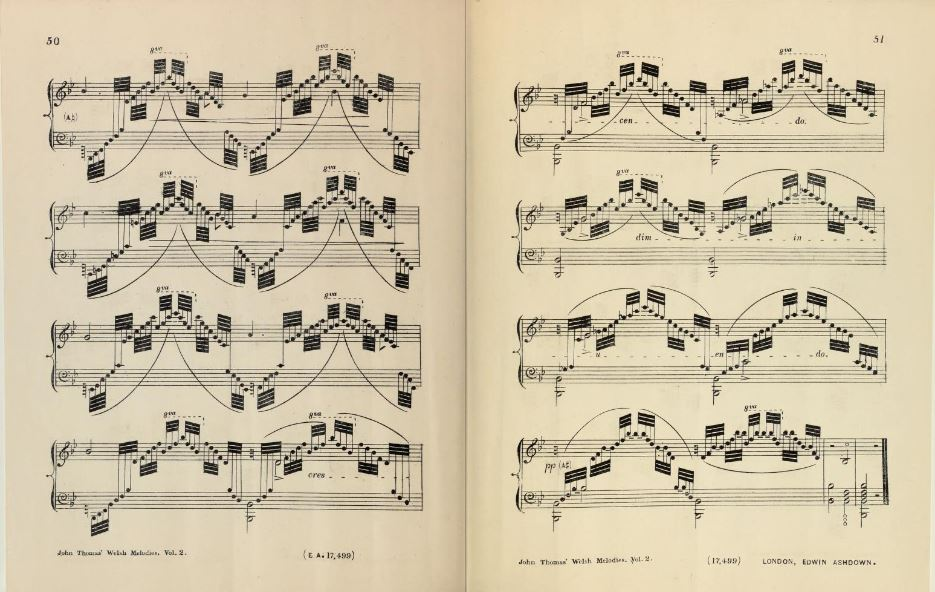
Pages 6–7 Ar Hyd y Nos in Welsh Melodies for the Harp by John Thomas

== See also ==
- Christian child's prayer § Lullabies
- List of Christmas carols
