= Myfanwy =

Welsh song

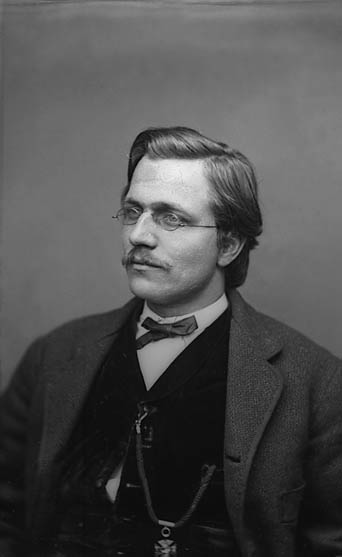
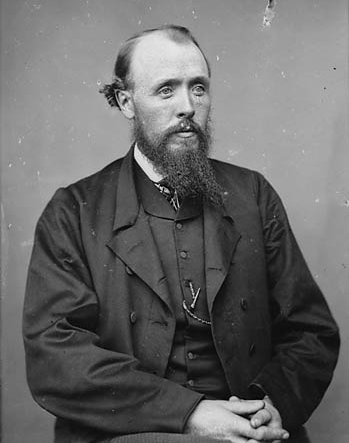
The music for Myfanwy was composed by Joseph Parry (left) with lyrics written by Richard Davies (right)

Myfanwy (Welsh: [məˈvanʊɨ̯, məˈvanʊi̯], a woman's name derived from Welsh annwyl 'beloved'), is a popular Welsh song composed by Joseph Parry in four parts for male voices, and first published in 1875.

== Background ==
Sources differ as to whether Joseph Parry composed the music to an existing poem by Richard Davies ("Mynyddog"; 1833–1877) or whether Davies wrote the words for Parry's melody.

Davies' lyrics were likely influenced by the 14th century love story of Myfanwy Fychan of Castell Dinas Brân and the bard Hywel ab Einion. The story was a popular subject for nineteenth century writers in Wales and was the subject of the poem, "Myfanwy Fychan" (1858), by John Ceiriog Hughes (1832–87). Other sources say it was written with Parry's childhood sweetheart, Myfanwy Llywellyn, in mind. The lyrics may also have been influenced by Thomas Walter Price English language poem, "Arabella". (Note: It is not known when or where Arabella was first published.)

The song debuted on 28 May 1875 at the first concert of the Aberystwyth and University Musical Society, with Parry as the conductor. It was published the same year, with Parry selling all rights to the publisher for just £12.

== Lyrics and literal translation ==
Paham mae dicter, O Myfanwy,
Yn llenwi'th lygaid duon di?
A'th ruddiau tirion, O Myfanwy,
Heb wrido wrth fy ngweled i?
Pa le mae'r wên oedd ar dy wefus
Fu'n cynnau cariad ffyddlon ffôl?
Pa le mae sain dy eiriau melys,
Fu'n denu 'nghalon ar dy ôl?

Pa beth a wneuthum, O Myfanwy,
I haeddu gwg dy ddwyrudd hardd?
Ai chwarae'r oeddit, O Myfanwy,
Â thanau euraidd serch dy fardd?
Wyt eiddo i'm trwy gywir amod,
A'i gormod cadw'th air i mi?
Ni fynaf byth mo'th law, Myfanwy,
Heb gael dy galon gyda hi.

Myfanwy, boed yr holl o'th fywyd,
Dan heulwen ddisglair canol dydd.
A boed i rosyn gwridog iechyd
I ddawnsio ganmlwydd ar dy rudd;
Anghofia'r oll o'th addewidion,
A wneist i rywun, eneth ddel,
A dyro'th law, Myfanwy dirion,
I ddim ond dweud y gair "Ffarwél".

Translation:

Why does anger, Oh Myfanwy,
Fill your dark eyes?
And your gentle cheeks, Oh Myfanwy,
Without blushing while beholding me?
Where is the smile that was upon your lips
That kindled foolish faithful love?
Where is the sound of your sweet words
That drew my heart after you?

What was it that I did, Oh Myfanwy,
To deserve the frown of your beautiful cheeks?
Were you playing, Oh Myfanwy,
With the golden fires of your poet's love?
You belong to me, through true proviso,
And is it too much to keep your word to me?
I'll never leave your hand, Myfanwy,
Unless I have your heart with it.

Myfanwy, may all of your life be
Beneath the sparkling sunshine of midday.
And may blushing roses of health
Dance on your cheek a hundred years.
Forget all your promises,
That you made to someone, pretty girl,
And give your hand, sweet Myfanwy,
Just to say the word "Farewell".

== History of the lyrics ==
The ownership of the copyright was sold by Isaac Jones of Treherbert to D.J. Snell of Swansea in 1930, who reprinted it the following year. This version is shown above, with the following modernizations of the Welsh language:
digter to dicter, cynau to cynnau, ffol to ffôl, melus to melys, ol to ôl, chwareu to chwarau, thânau to thanau, auraidd to euraidd, ammod to amod, ddysglaer to ddisglair, ffarwel to ffarwél.

There has been a proliferation of word changes since 1931, with so many performers covering it. In particular, most modern versions substitute 'nghariad for cariad in Verse 1, cheisiaf fyth for fynaf byth and Ai gormod for A'i gormod in Verse 2, and 'ngeneth ddel for eneth ddel in Verse 3.

== Melody ==
Here is the melody line from the 1931 publication.

== Usage and performances ==
As well as the song being sung in the original four parts by many choirs, the top melody line by itself has also become a solo love-song. A hundred years after it was first published Ryan Davies performed the song at the Swansea Top Rank introducing it as "the greatest love song ever written". A live recording of this version was included on Davies' album Ryan at the Rank and quickly became one of Davies' most notable and familiar performances.

Davies' rendition began a renewed popularity for the performance of the song, especially with Welsh Male Voice Choirs. Two of the most widely recognized choral renditions are by the Treorchy Male Voice Choir, and the Neath Male Voice Choir. The song is often performed at the Principality Stadium during the Welsh rugby team's home matches, and the Morriston Orpheus Choir recorded a version of the song for the Welsh Rugby Union's official album in 2006.

John Cale has performed the song throughout his career, most notably a 1992 TV performance on the S4C programme Heno. Opera singer, Bryn Terfel recorded a choral version of the song on his album "We'll Keep a Welcome". Cerys Matthews recorded a guitar version for her 2010 album Tir,

== Use in Media ==
=== Film and TV ===
The song features in John Ford's Academy Award-winning film How Green Was My Valley and also in the last scene of the Swansea-based movie Twin Town, where it is sung by members of many local choirs, including the Pontarddulais Male Choir. At a key moment of the plot, the protagonist in the 1992 Welsh-language film Hedd Wyn, which was nominated for an Academy Award, sings it to his former fiancée.

It is both played and discussed in the episode "Death and Dust" of the show Midsomer Murders, during a visit to Wales by detectives from an English village.

In the 2008 biographical romantic drama Edge of Love, Vera and Dylan Thomas played by Keira Knightley and Matthew Rhys respectively sing the song together to celebrate Vera's recent marriage to William Killick played by Cillian Murphy.

=== Literature ===
The song also features strongly in the debut novel A Terrible Kindness by Jo Browning Wroe about a young embalmer who serves in Aberfan in the aftermath of the mining disaster.
