= Richard Davies (Mynyddog) =

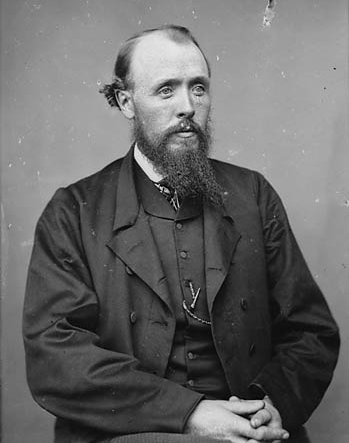
Richard Davies (Mynyddog)

Richard Davies (Mynyddog) (10 January 1833 – 14 July 1877) was a popular Welsh-language poet, singer, and Eisteddfod conductor. The original source of the name Mynyddog is from Newydd Fynyddog, a hill near his home. Another submission is the name comes from Mynyddog Mwynfawr, a character in an early Welsh poem. Use of an adopted Welsh-language pseudonym or bardic name (ffug enw) is common among Welsh poets.

== Birth and upbringing ==
He was born at Dôl Lydan, Llanbrynmair, Montgomeryshire, in a farmhouse called "Y Fron". His father, Daniel Davies, was deacon and precentor in Hen Gapel, while his mother, Jane, belonged to a bookish family. He was christened by John Roberts (1767–1834). When he was two years old, his parents moved to Fron in the same parish. He spent his early days as a farmer and shepherd, and was educated at the chapel school kept by the younger John Roberts (1804–1884). His open-air life in rural Wales among rural folk remained a central element of his work.

== Literary career ==
He was a frequent competitor at the Eisteddfodau, in both the classical and modern metres, and perhaps took his bardic name, Mynyddog, from Newydd Fynyddog, a hill near his home. There is no special merit in his work in the classical metres, but his lyrics became very popular. They were tuneful, unsophisticated poems, which dealt with the joys and tribulations of the common people, the folly of pride, and the absurdity of hypocrisy. He sang these at concerts all over Wales, accompanying himself on a little harmonium. He frequently visited London to listen to the principal singers there, and he was responsible for introducing instrumental music into Hen Gapel. He was in great demand as an adjudicator, a singer, and especially as an Eisteddfod conductor, in both England and Wales. Three volumes of his works were published in his lifetime: Caneuon Mynyddog, 1866; Yr Ail Gynnig, 1870; and Y Trydydd Gynnig, 1877 – and a fourth volume, Pedwerydd Llyfr Mynyddog, appeared posthumously in 1882. Two volumes of selections from his works were published in Cyfres y Fil. He contributed letters to the Herald Cymraeg, the Cronicl, and Dydd, using the pseudonyms Rhywun, Wmffra Edward, and Y Dyn a'r Baich Drain. These letters dealt with topics of the day and criticised stupid customs. He wrote the original versions of the words of at least two popular Welsh songs: Myfanwy and Sosban Fach.

== Later life ==
On 25 September 1871 he married Ann Elizabeth, daughter of Aaron Francis of Rhyl, and built a new house, Bron-y-gân, at Cemmaes, Montgomeryshire. In 1876, after conducting the "Black Chair Eisteddfod" at Wrexham, he accepted the invitation of his friends to visit America for the sake of his health, but this continued to deteriorate, and he returned to Bron-y-gân, where he died on 14 July 1877. He was buried in Hen Gapel graveyard on 19 July.

== Works ==
- Caneuon Mynyddog (1866)
- Yr Ail Gynnig (1870)
- Y Trydydd Cynnig (1877)
- Pedwerydd Llyfr Mynyddog (1882)
- Owen Morgan Edwards (ed.), Gwaith Mynyddog (Llanuwchllyn, 1914)

== Biography ==
- T. R. Roberts, Mynyddog (1909)

== Sources ==
- Cyberhymnal
