= Sosban Fach =

Traditional Welsh Folk Song

Sosban Fach (Welsh for "little saucepan") is a traditional Welsh folk song. It is one of the best-known and most often sung songs in the Welsh language.

The song is based on a verse written by 'Mynyddog' (Richard Davies) in 1873 as part of his song Rheolau yr Aelwyd ("Rules of the home") — see below. Talog Williams, an accountant from Dowlais, created the song we have today by altering Mynyddog's verse and adding four new verses. The song catalogues the troubles of a harassed housewife.

The song is associated with the rugby union club Llanelli RFC and, more recently, the Scarlets regional rugby side. The association derives from Llanelli's tin plating industry, which used to tin-plate steel saucepans and other kitchen utensils as a cheap supply to the British public. During the final years of Stradey Park, the former ground of Llanelli RFC and the Scarlets, the goalposts were adorned with Scarlet saucepans as a tribute to the town's history; the utensils have been transferred to the clubs' new ground, Parc y Scarlets. The Scarlets' official magazine is titled Sosban.

== Lyrics ==
Welsh Mae bys Meri-Ann wedi brifo, A Dafydd y gwas ddim yn iach. Mae'r baban yn y crudd yn crio, A'r gath wedi sgramo Joni bach. Sosban fach yn berwi ar y tân, Sosban fawr yn berwi ar y llawr, A'r gath wedi sgramo Joni bach. Dai bach y soldiwr, Dai bach y soldiwr, Dai bach y soldiwr, A chwt ei grys e mas. Mae bys Meri-Ann wedi gwella, A Dafydd y gwas yn ei fedd; Mae'r baban yn y crudd wedi tyfu, A'r gath wedi huno mewn hedd. Sosban fach yn berwi ar y tân Sosban fawr yn berwi ar y llawr A'r gath wedi huno mewn hedd. Dai bach y sowldiwr, Dai bach y sowldiwr, Dai bach y sowldiwr, A chwt ei grys e mas. Aeth hen Fari Jones i Ffair y Caerau I brynu set o lestri de; Ond mynd i'r ffos aeth Mari gyda'i llestri Trwy yfed gormod lawer iawn o "de" Sosban fach yn berwi ar y tân Sosban fawr yn berwi ar y llawr A'r gath wedi huno mewn hedd.	English (literal translation) Mary-Ann has hurt her finger, And David the servant is not well. The baby in the cradle is crying, And the cat has scratched little Johnny. A little saucepan is boiling on the fire, A big saucepan is boiling on the floor, And the cat has scratched little Johnny. Little Dai the soldier, Little Dai the soldier, Little Dai the soldier, And his shirt tail is hanging out. Mary-Ann's finger has got better, And David the servant is in his grave; The baby in the cradle has grown up, And the cat is "asleep in peace". A little saucepan is boiling on the fire, A big saucepan is boiling on the floor, And the cat is "asleep in peace". Little Dai the soldier, Little Dai the soldier, Little Dai the soldier, And his shirt tail is hanging out. Old Mary Jones went to the fair in Caerau, To buy a tea set; But Mary and her teacups ended up in a ditch, By drinking rather too much "tea". A little saucepan is boiling on the fire, A big saucepan is boiling on the floor, And the cat is "asleep in peace".

=== Variations ===
This song has been adopted by the fans of the rugby teams, Llanelli RFC and the Llanelli Scarlets. Many English variations can be heard in the stands during rugby matches.

After Llanelli beat a strong New Zealand side on 31 October 1972, a new English chorus could be heard:

Who beat the All Blacks,
Who beat the All Blacks,
Who beat the All Blacks
Good old Sosban fach.

Honouring the Llanelli RFC teams which beat the touring Australian national teams in 1908 and 1992, a further English chorus variation has been sung alongside the All Blacks verse:

Who beat the Walla-Wallabies?
Who beat the Walla-Wallabies?
Who beat the Walla-Wallabies?
Good old Sosban Fach

Other variations include the following.

Who beat the Leicester Tigers?
Who beat the Leicester Tigers?
Good old Dafydd James

Dafydd James refers to a player who scored the winning points in a Heineken Cup match.

A verse was "uncovered" in Patagonia that is sung by descendants of Welsh settlers and follows the second original verse:

Fe gladdwyd y gath mewn lle doniol:
Mewn bocs lle'r oedd Nain yn cadw'r startsh,
A dodwyd ei chorff mewn beddrod,
A'r band yn chwarae y death-march

("The cat was buried in a funny place / In a box where Granny kept starch / Her body was placed in a grave / And the band is playing the death march.")

=== Original verse by Mynyddog ===
Welsh Pan fyddo yr aelwyd yn oeri, A'r anwyd yn dyfod o'r gwaed; Pan fyddo y trwyn bron a rhewi A'r winrew ar fysedd y traed; Pan fo Catherine Ann wedi briwio A Dafydd y gwas ddim yn iach, A'r babi yn nadu a chrio A'r gath wedi crafu John Bach: Rhowch broc i'r tân, A chanwch gân I gadw'r cwerylon o'r aelwyd lân.	English When the hearth cools And the blood runs cold; When the nose is almost frozen And the toes are freezing; When Catherine Ann is hurt And Dafydd the servant is not well, And the baby is howling and crying And the cat has scratched little John: Put wood on the fire And sing a song To keep quarrels away from the fair hearth

== Other media ==
Author Diana Wynne Jones refers to the song several times as 'Calcifer's silly saucepan song' in her book Howl's Moving Castle.

The Welsh rock band Man has a recording of the song on their album Back Into the Future, 1973. It is sung by the Gwalia Male Choir.

Bryn Terfel recorded the song on his 2000 album We'll Keep a Welcome.

== See also ==
- Sospan Dau, a ship named for the song
