= South Wales Echo =

Daily tabloid newspaper published in Cardiff, Wales

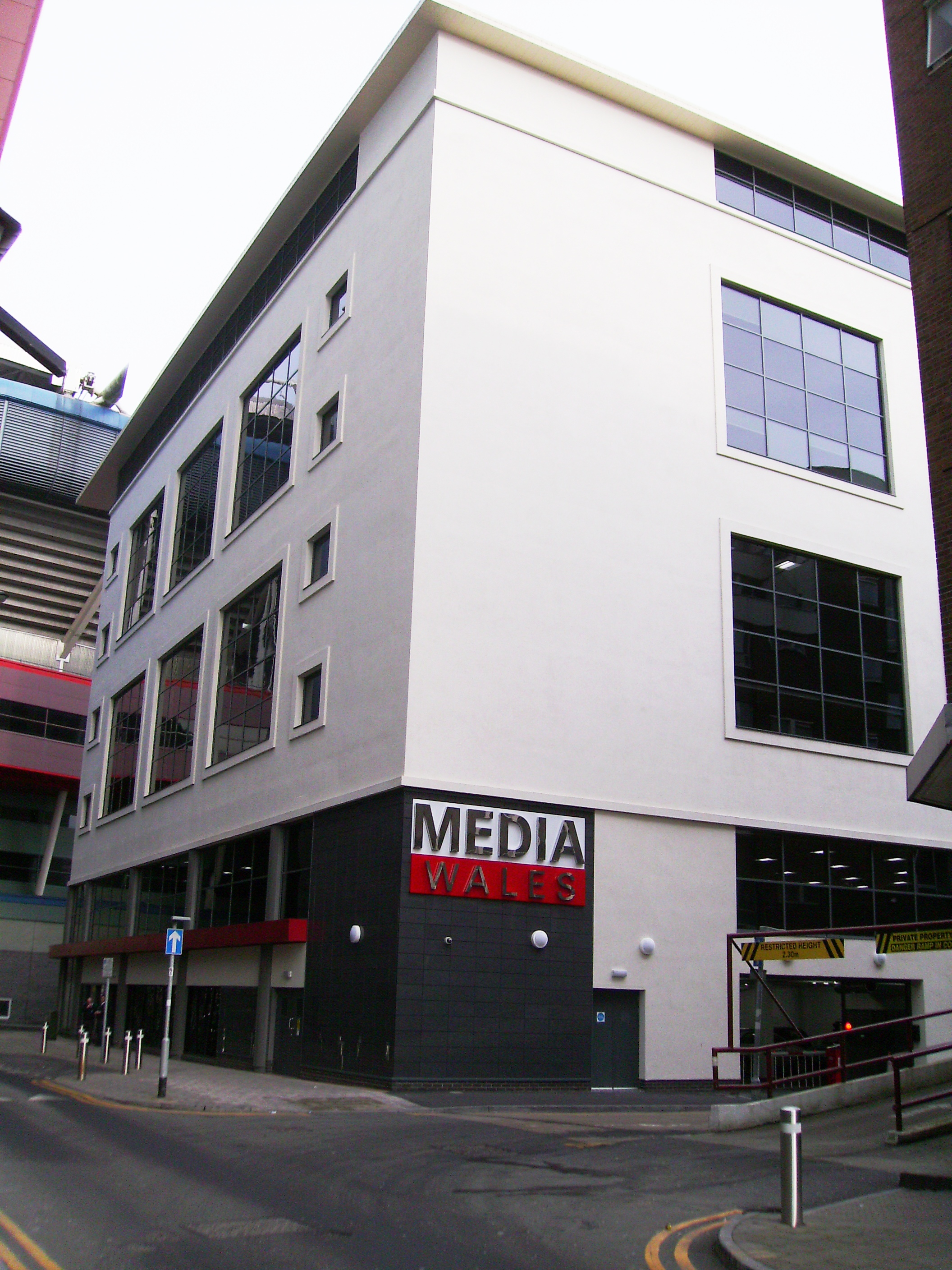
- Six Park Street, Cardiff
- Type: Daily newspaper
- Format: Tabloid
- Owner: Reach plc
- Editor: Tryst Williams
- Founded: 1884
- Language: English
- Headquarters: 6 Park Street, Cardiff, Wales
- Circulation: 3,175 (as of 2024)
- Website: www.walesonline.co.uk

The South Wales Echo is a daily tabloid newspaper published in Cardiff, Wales and distributed throughout the surrounding area. It has a circulation of 3,175.

== Background ==
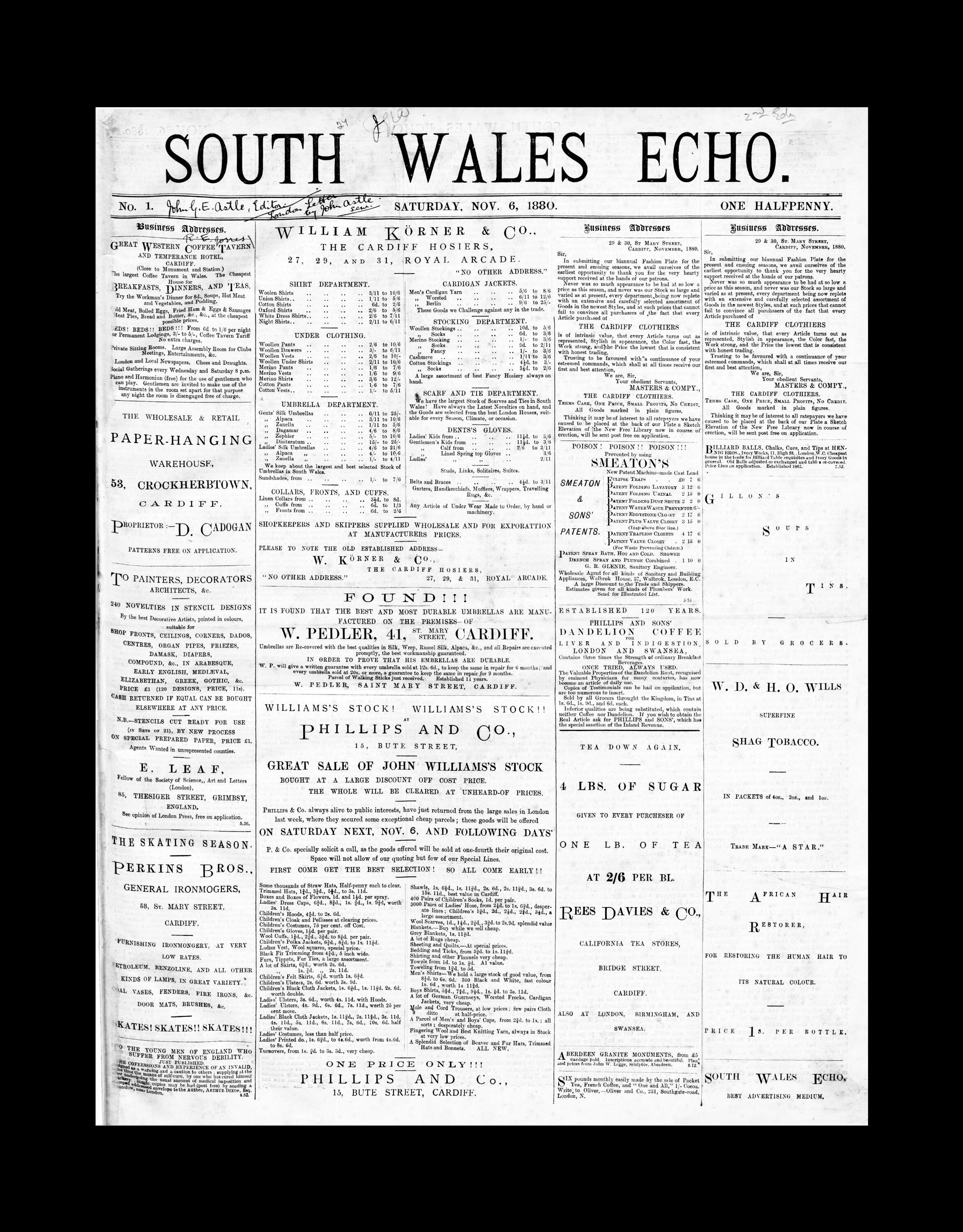
6 November 1880, South Wales Echo, front page, earliest surviving copy

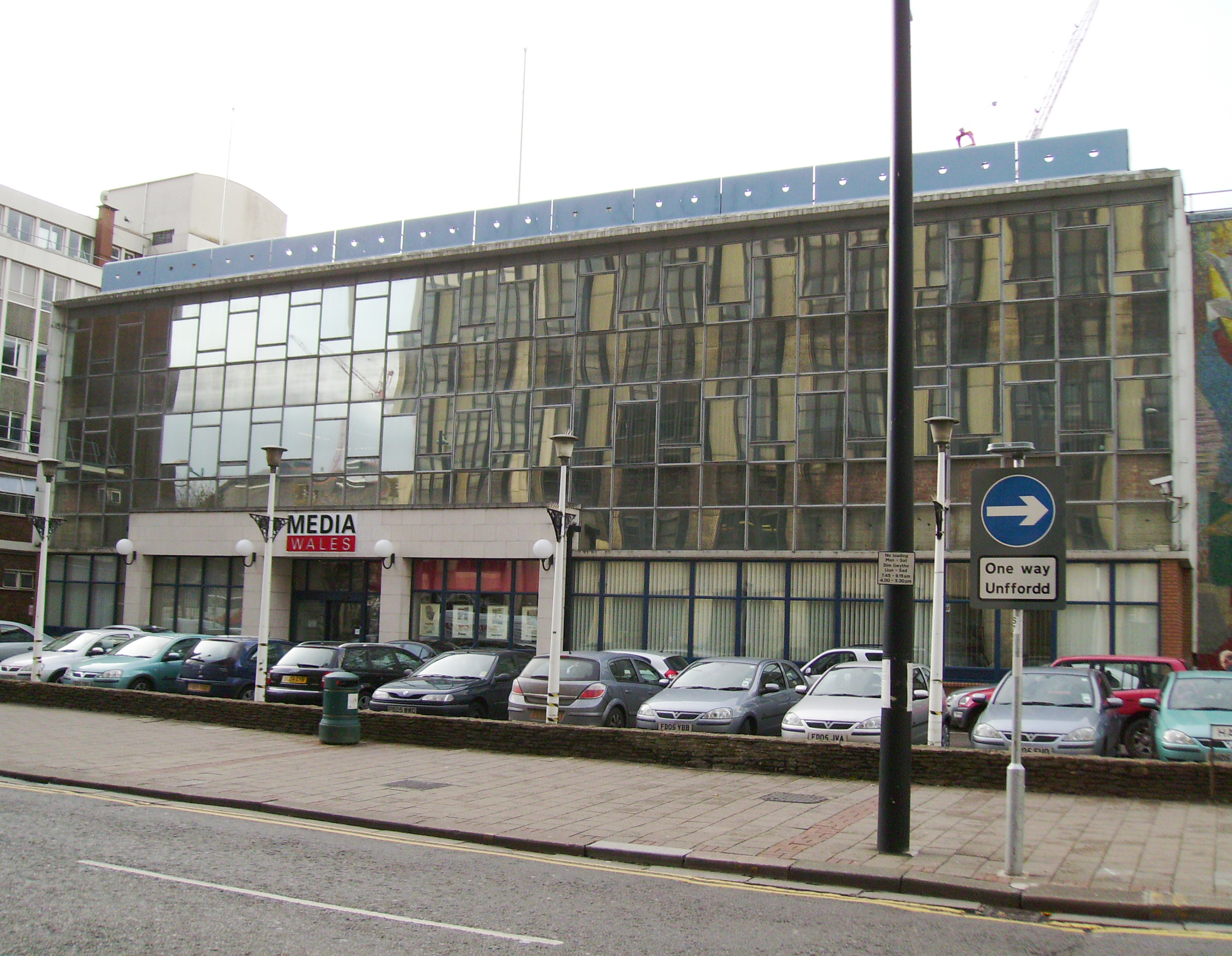
Media Wales, printing plant and main offices, Thomson House, Havelock Street and Park Street, Cardiff, Wales, 2007, demolished in 2008

The newspaper was founded in 1884 and was based in Thomson House, Cardiff city centre. It is published by Media Wales Ltd (formerly Western Mail & Echo Ltd), part of the Reach plc group. In 2008, Media Wales moved from Thomson House, Havelock Street and Park Street, to Six Park Street and Scott Road, west of the former main offices and printing plant, south of the Principality Stadium. There is a Weekend edition published every Saturday.

Among many other writers, novelist Ken Follett, science writer Brian J. Ford, cartoonist Gren Jones, journalist Sue Lawley and news reader Michael Buerk, have spent part of their careers with the Echo.

== Football Echo ==
An associated paper, the Football Echo, later called the Sport Echo, was published on Saturday afternoons from 1919 until 2006. Printed on-site, on pink paper, it was available soon after the final whistle of rugby and football matches, across the street. At its peak the Football Echo sold up to 80,000 copies.

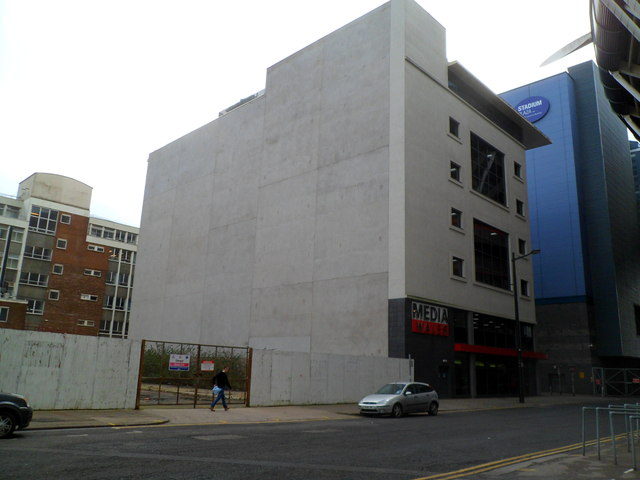
Media Wales, Cardiff

== See also ==
- List of newspapers in Wales
