= Ronald Niebour =

British cartoonist who used the penname NEB

- Daily Mail cartoon depicting Winston Churchill and Clement Attlee (1951)
- Born: 4 April 1903; Streatham, London
- Died: 19 July 1979 (aged 76); Benajarafe, Málaga, Spain
- Other name: NEB
- Known for: Political cartoons

Ronald Niebour (4 April 1903 - 19 July 1972) was a British cartoonist who used the penname NEB. He is best known for his pocket cartoons in the Daily Mail.

== Early life ==
Ronald Niebour was born in Streatham, London, on 4 April 1903. He was educated at Barry County School in South Wales which he attended with Leslie Illingworth, who was later his colleague as a cartoonist on the Daily Mail.

After two years in the Merchant Navy Niebour became a schoolteacher, teaching metalwork and handicrafts for three years at schools in Birmingham, Weymouth and Kendal.

== Cartoonist ==
Niebour was self-taught as an artist. His was initially the Football Cartoonist for the Barry Dock News and the Cardiff Evening Express. He became the Sports Cartoonist of the Oxford Mail, before joining the staff of the Birmingham Gazette and the Birmingham Evening Despatch.

After submitting some sketches, Niebour joined the Daily Mail in London on 26 September 1938, initially working on the Woman's Page and the Gardening Notes. After the outbreak of World War II he changed to drawing pocket cartoons, which became very popular. At the end of the war one of his cartoons was found in a file in the ruins of Hitler's Chancellery.

Niebour also drew advertisements and worked for Punch.

Niebour retired from the Daily Mail on 1 December 1960 and died at his home in Benajarafe, near Málaga, Spain, on 19 July 1972.
