= Max Boyce =

Welsh singer and comedian (born 1943)

Max Boyce MBE
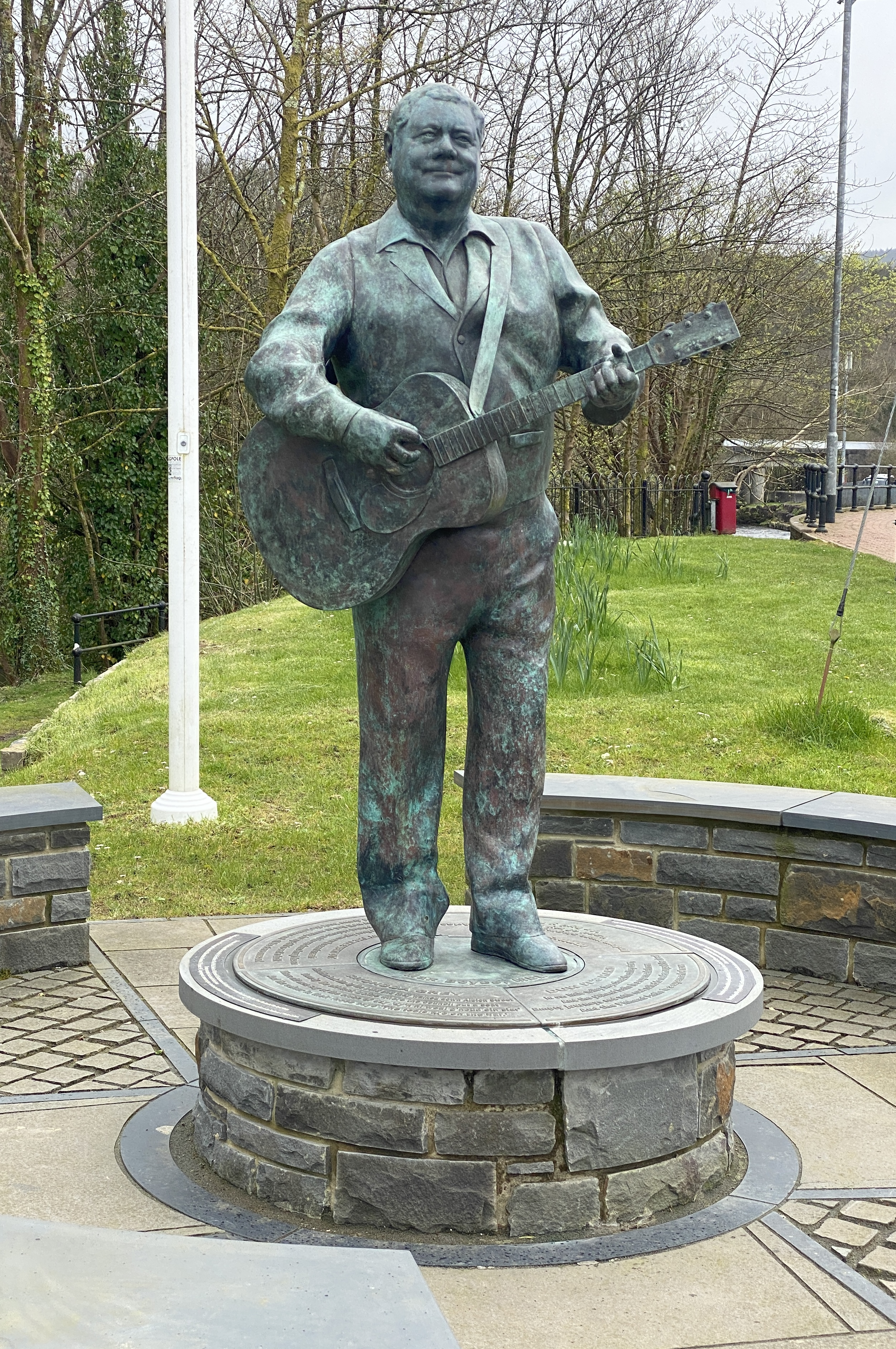
- A statue of Max Boyce in Glynneath

Background information
- Born: Leonard Maxwell Boyce; 27 September 1943 (age 82); Glynneath, Glamorgan, Wales
- Genres: Folk
- Occupations: Comedian, folk musician
- Instruments: Vocals, acoustic guitar
- Years active: 1971–present
- Label: EMI
- Website: www.maxboyce.co.uk

Leonard Maxwell Boyce (born 27 September 1943) is a Welsh comedian, singer and entertainer from Glynneath, Wales. He rose to fame in the mid-1970s with an act that combined musical comedy with his passion for rugby union and his origins in a South Wales mining community. Boyce's We All Had Doctors' Papers (1975) remains the only comedy album to have topped the UK Albums Chart; he has sold more than two million albums in a career spanning four decades.

== Early life ==
Max Boyce was born in Glynneath. His family was originally from Ynyshir in the Rhondda Valley. His mother was Mary Elizabeth Harries. A month preceding Boyce's birth, his father, Leonard Boyce, died of severe burns injuries following an explosion in the Onllwyn No.4 coal pit where he worked. At the age of fifteen, Boyce left school, went to live with his grandfather, and worked in a colliery "for nearly eight years". In his early twenties, he managed to find alternative work in the Metal Box factory, Melin, Neath, as an electrician's apprentice, but his earlier mining experiences were to influence his music considerably in later years.

Boyce first learned to play the guitar as a young man, but he showed no particular flair for the instrument, nor an actual desire to become a performer. In his own words: "[I had] no desire at all to be anything. I had a love of poetry, and eventually started writing songs without any ambition to build a career. It just happened. I started writing songs about local things and it evolved." Nevertheless, in time he became competent enough to perform at local eisteddfodau, one of the earliest known recordings of his work being "O Na Le", a folk tune in Welsh which he played at the Dyffryn Lliw eisteddfod in 1967.

In the early 1970s, Boyce undertook a mining engineering degree at the Glamorgan School of Mines in Trefforest (now the University of South Wales), during which he began to pen tunes about life in the mining communities of South Wales. He started out performing in local sports clubs and folk clubs around 1970, where his original set began to take on a humorous element, interspersed by anecdotes of Welsh community life and of the national sport, rugby union.

== Music career ==
The first recording of Boyce's songs was made at the Valley Folk Club in Pontardawe in 1971 by Cambrian Records, which subsequently released an LP called Max Boyce in Session. This album included several tracks that were to later become his signature tunes, including "Hymns and Arias", "Duw it's Hard" and "Slow – Men at Work". The record sleeve of this album includes the prediction: "It may well be that future years will find 'Hymns and Arias' rolling a thunderous chorus across the terraced rugby grounds."

In the same year, he also recorded Caneuon Amrywiol ("Miscellaneous Songs"), a collection of Welsh folk songs under the same label. Nevertheless, Boyce remained virtually unknown beyond the music clubs of the South Wales valleys for the time being, where he continued to perform.This all changed towards the end of 1973. Boyce had competed, unsuccessfully, on the television talent show Opportunity Knocks, shortly before record label EMI heard his first album, Max Boyce in Session, and came to see him in concert. EMI offered Boyce a two-album contract, and arrangements were made to make a live recording of his upcoming concert at Treorchy Rugby Club. This performance, which took place on 23 November 1973, was given in front of an audience who received their tickets free of charge, after these failed to sell for fifty pence. His performance was warmly received by the crowd, as can be heard in the final recording. The resulting album, Live at Treorchy, brought Boyce into the public eye, and it soon went gold.

His next album, We All Had Doctors' Papers, was also live, recorded at Pontarddulais Rugby Club. This was released in late 1975 and, unexpectedly, it reached the No. 1 position on the UK Albums Chart for the week ending 15 November. This recording has the distinction of being the only comedy album to ever top the UK Albums Chart. Boyce released several albums over the next few years, receiving further gold discs for The Incredible Plan in 1976, and I Know 'Cos I Was There in 1978.

This early pinnacle in Boyce's career coincided with the dominance of the Wales rugby team in the Five Nations Championship during the 1970s. His songs and poems were real-time reflections on this unfolding history, often invoking the names of Welsh rugby greats such as Barry John, Gareth Edwards and Dai Morris. Songs such as "Hymns and Arias" soon became popular with rugby crowds, increasing his ongoing popularity. When Swansea City were promoted to the English Premier League in 2011, Boyce was asked to perform for their first game and produced a special version of "Hymns and Arias" for the occasion.

His rise to fame was confirmed by an appearance on the long-running biographical series This Is Your Life on 22 February 1978. He had gone to watch Glynneath RFC play against Hawick Trades, and was surprised by the host of This Is Your Life, Eamonn Andrews, at the end of the match, whilst he was being interviewed.

== Television and other side projects ==
As Boyce's popularity became established across Wales and the rest of the United Kingdom, he became involved in many side projects, including three books, several television series and televised concerts, and three multi-part television specials produced by Opix Films. His spoken and sung poetry was first collected in Max Boyce: His Songs and Poems in 1976, with an introduction by Barry John. The comic illustrations that accompany the poems were drawn by his friend Gren Jones of the South Wales Echo (who had also illustrated the cover of We All Had Doctors' Papers). This publication was followed up with a similar collection, I Was There!, in 1980.

In 1982, Boyce went to the United States to be filmed participating at a training camp held by the Dallas Cowboys in California. The resulting four-part series, Max Boyce Meets The Dallas Cowboys was screened by Channel 4 in November that year. He returned to America in early 1984 to try his hand at being a cowboy in the rodeos of the Midwestern United States. The result of his bull riding and rodeo clown antics was Boyce Goes West, which also became a four-part series that was broadcast in June 1984.

In the following year, Boyce took part in the World elephant polo Championships near Kathmandu, Nepal, with an all-star team sponsored by the jewellers and watchmakers Cartier. His team, consisting of Ringo Starr, Barbara Bach, Billy Connolly and Cartier chairman Alain Perrin, only managed to score a single goal during the tournament. To the North of Katmandu was released in 1986. These made-for-television adventures in America and Nepal, as well as many other anecdotes of his worldwide touring in the late 1970s and early 1980s, became the focus of an autobiography, Max Boyce in the Mad Pursuit of Applause, first published in 1987.

In 1990, Boyce entered the world of theatre by taking on the title role of Jack in Jack and the Beanstalk alongside Ian Botham. Debuting in the Alhambra Theatre in Bradford, the show went on to play in other centres, including Cardiff, Norwich and Edinburgh.

== Later career ==
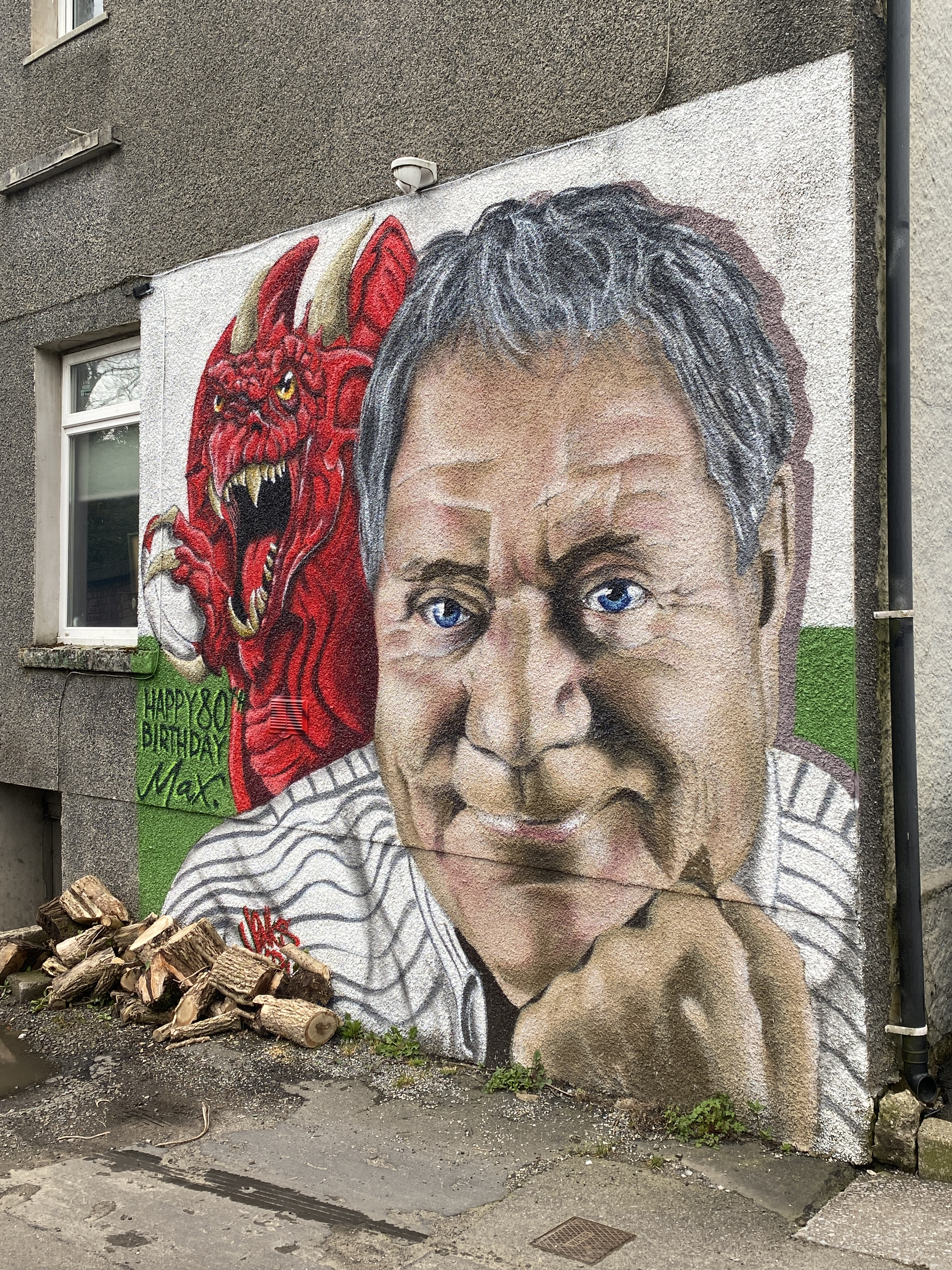
a mural of Max Boyce

Boyce's career declined in the early 1990s but experienced a revival later in the decade. In December 1998, BBC Wales screened An Evening With Max Boyce, which broke Welsh viewing records. The following year, he performed at the opening ceremonies of the 1999 Rugby World Cup in the Millennium Stadium, and of the Welsh Assembly. Not long after, he was included on the 2000 New Year Honours list, and received an MBE from Prince Charles in a ceremony at Cardiff Castle on 15 March that year.

Boyce toured Australia in 2003, coinciding with the Rugby World Cup which was being hosted there. He held concerts in Adelaide, Melbourne, and at the Sydney Opera House, which was later released on DVD as Max Boyce: Down Under.

On 29 May 2006, Boyce headlined at a concert in Pontypridd to celebrate the 150th anniversary of the Welsh national anthem, "Hen Wlad fy Nhadau". In August 2006, he hit out against the stereotypical use of the word "boyo" in the media, following its resurgence in reference to Welsh Big Brother contestant Glyn Wise.

Boyce returned to Treorchy in early 2011 to perform a show at the Parc and Dare Theatre, shown on St David's Day on BBC1 Wales. He was joined onstage by guests including Boyd Clack, and the audience featured such Welsh icons as Gareth Edwards.

His 70th birthday was celebrated with an hour-long programme shown on BBC One Wales on 25 September 2013, recorded in front of a live celebrity audience.

Harry Secombe is one of the most famous of comedians from Wales. His reputation however rests with his singing and Neddy Seagoonery. Sir Geraint Evans possessed considerable talent for comedy and made us laugh in the roles of Falstaff and Leporello, but his career depended every move on his voice. Until Max Boyce, I can think of no-one who has become famous outside Wales for his Welshness.

— Jack Waterman, The Listener, 1979

In recognition of Boyce's 80th birthday, a bronze statue of him was erected in his home town of Glynneath.

== Personal life ==
Boyce has a wife and children, who live away from the public eye in his hometown of Glynneath, in South Wales. He has been the president of Glynneath RFC and the Club President of Glynneath Golf Club, where the "Max Boyce Classic" is held every two or three years.

Boyce was inducted into the Gorsedd of Bards at the 1971 National Eisteddfod of Wales in the Lliw Valley.

In 2014, Boyce was diagnosed with heart problems and underwent a quadruple heart bypass.

== Discography ==
=== Albums ===
- Max Boyce in Session: 1971 · Cambrian Records
- Caneuon Amrywiol: 1971 · Cambrian Records
- Live at Treorchy: 1974 · EMI (re-released on CD in 1995) (gold)
- We All Had Doctors' Papers: 1975 · EMI (gold)
- The Incredible Plan: 1976 · EMI (gold)
- The Road and Miles: 1977 · EMI
- I Know 'cos I was There: 1978 · EMI (gold)
- Not that I am Biased: 1979 · EMI
- Me and Billy Williams: 1980 · EMI
- Farewell to the North Enclosure: 1980 · EMI
- It's Good to See You: 1981 · EMI
- Troubadour: 1987 · EMI

=== Compilation albums ===
- Croeso Cambrian – Dyffryn Lliw Eisteddfod: 1973 · Cambrian Records (one track – "O Na Le")
- Perlau Ddoe: 15 November 1999 · Sain Recordiau Cyf (one track – "Fel'na Mae")
- Max Boyce: 25 July 2005 · EMI
- The Very Best of Max Boyce: 26 September 2005 · EMI

== Videography ==
=== DVD album ===
- Max Boyce: Down Under: 2004 (2003 concert from the Sydney Opera House, Australia)

== Filmography ==
=== Television series/films ===
- Poems and Pints (14 episodes): 21 December 1972 – 28 February 1978 · BBC Cymru
- Max Boyce
  - Series One (four episodes): 25 February – 18 March 1977, Fridays at 10.45pm · BBC1
  - Series Two (four episodes): 27 January – 17 February 1978, Fridays at 10.50 pm · BBC1
- Max Boyce And Friends (three episodes): 4–18 May 1983, Wednesdays at 9.25 pm · BBC1
- Boyce Goes West (four episodes): 21 June – 12 July 1984, Thursdays at 8.30 pm · BBC1
- It's Max Boyce (four episodes): 3–30 December 1984, Mondays at 7.40 pm · BBC1

=== Television specials ===
- Max Boyce Entertains: 28 February 1976, 11.05 pm · BBC1
- How Green Was My Father: 1 March 1976, 10.40 pm · BBC2
- Max Boyce (specials of the television series):
  - 21 December 1977, 9.25 pm · BBC1
  - 27 December 1978, 10.45 pm · BBC1
  - 15 November 1979, 10.30 pm · BBC1
  - 15 May 1980, 8.25 pm · BBC1
  - 2 January 1981, 9.15 pm · BBC1
  - 21 December 1981, 9.25 pm · BBC1
- The Road and the Miles Of Max Boyce: 26 December 1979, 4.35 pm · BBC1
- Max Boyce Meets the Dallas Cowboys: 4 November 1982, 8.00 pm · Channel 4
- To the North of Katmandu: completed in 1986, but not initially televised.
- An Evening With Max Boyce: Christmas 1998 · BBC Wales
- A Lifetime of Laughter: 2004 · BBC Wales

=== Guest appearances ===
- This Is Your Life (Season 18, Episode 14): 22 February 1978 · ITV
- The Bob Monkhouse Show (Season 2, Episode 3): 21 January 1985, 8.10 pm · BBC2
- Have I Got News for You (Season 14, Episode 2): 31 October 1997 · BBC2
- Cable Connects (Season 2, Episode 1): 14 November 2005 · BBC Wales
- I'm Sorry I Haven't A Clue (Season 25, show 3): 14 December 1998 / 21 December 1998 · Radio 4

== Published works ==
- Max Boyce: His Songs and Poems (1976), ISBN 0-586-04621-6
- I Was There! (1979), ISBN 0-297-77609-6
- Max Boyce in the Mad Pursuit of Applause (1987), ISBN 1-85145-136-6
- Max Boyce: Hymns & Arias: The Selected Poems, Songs and Stories (2021), ISBN 1913640957
