= Mai Jones =

British songwriter (1899–1960)

Mai Jones (6 February 1899 – 7 May 1960), was a Welsh songwriter, entertainer and radio producer.

== Biography ==
Jones was born in Newport, Monmouthshire, the daughter of the local railway stationmaster. Having won a scholarship to study music at the University of Wales, Cardiff, she went on to the Royal College of Music. Her early successes included being selected as one of the official accompanists for the National Eisteddfod of Wales at Pontypool in 1924. Singing and playing both piano and accordion, she began to make a name for herself as an entertainer in London, and broadcast on radio for the first time with Jack Payne's band. During the 1920–30s, she also contributed the contralto voice to a well-known and often broadcast singing duo called The Carroll Sisters, with Elsie Eaves (soprano).

In 1941, she joined the BBC in Cardiff as a radio producer of light entertainment programmes. Programmes produced by her included Welsh Rarebit and Saturday Starlight. As part of the wartime Cardiff artistic and music community Mai had known Idloes Owen, also a composer, arranger and conductor, who performed with the pre-war Lyrian Singers. Idloes went on to found the Welsh National Opera in 1943. He was instrumental in providing Mai with a musical score written originally by a fellow Lyrian performer, Thomas Morgan. Mai then collaborated with lyricists Lyn Joshua and James Harper to create the now Welsh standard "We'll Keep a Welcome". It had its début on 29 February 1940; the BBC's resident 25-strong male voice choir, the Lyrian Singers, performed the new song. It was an overnight success.

Successful songs written by Mai Jones included: "Blackbirds" (1924), "Wondering If You Remember" (1927), "We'll Keep a Welcome" (1940), "Nos Da/Good night" (1946) and "Rhondda Rhapsody" (1951).

In 1947, she married a singer, David Davies. She retired from the BBC in 1958 and died not long afterwards as a result of a head injury. Her husband outlived her. A plaque commemorating her was unveiled in 2010 at the couple's former home in St Marks Crescent, Newport.
