= WRU Division Three West =

Rugby union league in Wales

- Founded: 1995
- No. of teams: 12
- Country: Wales
- Most recent champion: Haverfordwest RFC (2011–12)
- Level on pyramid: 4
- Promotion to: WRU Division Two West
- Relegation to: WRU Division Four West
- Website: www.wru.co.uk/eng/club/swalecleagues/index.php

The Welsh Rugby Union Division Three West (also called the SWALEC Division Three West for sponsorship reasons) is a rugby union league in Wales.

== Competition format and sponsorship ==
=== Competition ===
There are 12 clubs in the WRU Division Three West. During the course of a season (which lasts from September to May) each club plays the others twice, once at their home ground and once at that of their opponents for a total of 22 games for each club, with a total of 132 games in each season. Teams receive four points for a win and two point for a draw, an additional bonus point is awarded to either team if they score four tries or more in a single match. No points are awarded for a loss though the losing team can gain a bonus point for finishing the match within seven points of the winning team. Teams are ranked by total points, then the number of tries scored and then points difference. At the end of each season, the club with the most points is crowned as champion. If points are equal the tries scored then points difference determines the winner. The team who is declared champion at the end of the season is eligible for promotion to the WRU Division Two West. The two lowest placed teams are relegated into the WRU Division Four West.

=== Sponsorship ===
In 2008 the Welsh Rugby Union announced a new sponsorship deal for the club rugby leagues with SWALEC valued at £1 million (GBP). The initial three year sponsorship was extended at the end of the 2010/11 season, making SWALEC the league sponsors until 2015. The leagues sponsored are the WRU Divisions one through to seven.

- (2002-2005) Lloyds TSB
- (2005-2008) Asda
- (2008-2015) SWALEC

== 2011/2012 season ==
=== League Teams ===
- Cardigan RFC
- Dunvant RFC
- Gorseinon RFC
- Haverfordwest RFC
- Lampeter Town RFC
- Llandeilo RFC
- Newcastle Emlyn RFC
- Penclawdd RFC
- Pontarddulais RFC
- Pontyberem RFC
- Tenby United RFC
- Tumble RFC

=== 2011/2012 Table ===
2011-12 WRU Division Three West Table
	Club	Played	Won	Drawn	Lost	Points for	Points against	Tries for	Tries against	Try bonus	Losing bonus	Points
1	Haverfordwest RFC	22	16	0	6	530	406	69	52	9	3	76
2	Dunvant RFC	22	14	2	6	555	344	70	37	9	6	75
3	Penclawdd RFC	22	14	1	7	442	337	46	33	3	3	64
4	Llandeilo RFC	22	12	0	10	373	332	40	37	2	5	55
5	Cardigan RFC	22	11	0	11	411	345	53	35	5	5	54
6	Tumble RFC	22	11	2	9	451	474	52	58	5	1	54
7	Newcastle Emlyn RFC	22	9	3	10	380	433	47	54	4	2	48
8	Gorseinon RFC	22	9	0	13	397	423	46	53	4	8	48
9	Tenby United RFC	22	8	3	11	422	464	49	54	6	4	48
10	Lampeter Town RFC	22	8	1	13	363	470	36	53	5	4	43
11	Pontyberem RFC	22	8	0	14	386	497	44	60	4	5	41
12	Pontarddulais RFC	22	4	4	14	324	509	36	62	2	1	27
Correct as of 26 May 2012

== 2010/2011 season ==
=== League Teams ===
- Crymych RFC
- Dunvant RFC
- Gorseinon RFC
- Haverfordwest RFC
- Lampeter Town RFC
- Laugharne RFC
- Llandeilo RFC
- Llanelli Wanderers RFC
- Mumbles RFC
- Penclawdd RFC
- Pontarddulais RFC
- Tumble RFC

=== 2010/2011 Table ===
2010-11 WRU Division Three West Table
	Club	Played	Won	Drawn	Lost	Points for	Points against	Tries for	Tries against	Try bonus	Losing bonus	Points
1	Crymych RFC	22	22	0	0	689	324	82	37	12	0	100
2	Mumbles RFC	22	17	0	5	650	378	88	43	13	2	83
3	Dunvant RFC	22	12	1	9	531	361	72	45	6	6	62
4	Haverfordwest RFC	22	10	2	10	579	426	72	52	11	6	61
5	Penclawdd RFC	22	12	1	9	442	381	53	45	3	5	58
6	Gorseinon RFC	22	10	0	12	506	434	65	53	7	5	52
7	Llandeilo RFC	22	10	0	12	332	380	36	42	3	4	47
8	Lampeter Town RFC	22	10	1	11	373	502	35	66	3	1	46
9	Tumble RFC	22	8	2	12	415	556	51	75	4	4	44
10	Pontarddulais RFC	22	7	2	13	416	512	59	67	8	4	44
11	Llanelli Wanderers RFC	22	5	1	16	311	638	38	82	2	2	26
12	Laugharne RFC	22	4	0	18	323	675	43	87	4	4	24
13	Dunvant RFC	0	0	0	0	0	0	0	0	0	0	0
Correct as of 26 May 2012

== 2009/2010 season ==
=== League Teams ===
- Cardigan RFC
- Crymych RFC
- Gorseinon RFC
- Haverfordwest RFC
- Lampeter Town RFC
- Laugharne RFC
- Llandeilo RFC
- Llanelli Wanderers RFC
- Llanybydder RFC
- Morriston RFC
- Newcastle Emlyn RFC
- Penclawdd RFC

=== 2009/2010 Table ===
2009-10 WRU Division Three West Table
Club	Played	Won	Drawn	Lost	Points for	Points against	Tries for	Tries against	Try bonus	Losing bonus	Points
Newcastle Emlyn RFC	22	19	0	3	461	279	50	28	7	3	86
Llandeilo RFC	22	16	0	6	539	321	70	39	8	4	76
Crymych RFC	22	16	0	6	469	338	59	40	6	3	73
Gorseinon RFC	22	14	1	7	500	366	64	45	8	3	69
Laugharne RFC	22	11	0	11	505	399	68	45	6	8	58
Morriston RFC	22	10	0	12	459	429	61	50	6	6	52
Haverfordwest RFC	22	9	0	13	472	517	62	68	7	5	48
Lampeter Town RFC	22	9	1	12	382	436	44	53	3	4	45
Llanelli Wanderers RFC	22	9	0	13	396	522	47	65	4	3	43
Penclawdd RFC	22	8	0	14	302	395	29	45	2	8	42
Cardigan RFC	22	7	2	13	368	386	44	45	4	6	42
Llanybydder RFC	22	2	0	20	211	676	23	98	0	3	11
Correct as of 3 August 2010

== 2008/2009 season ==
=== League Teams ===
- Aberystwyth RFC
- Amman United RFC
- Cardigan RFC
- Crymych RFC
- Haverfordwest RFC
- Lampeter Town RFC
- Laugharne RFC
- Llanelli Wanderers RFC
- Llanybydder RFC
- Newcastle Emlyn RFC
- Pontyberem RFC
- Tumble RFC

=== 2008/2009 Table ===
2008-09 WRU Division Three West Table
Club	Played	Won	Drawn	Lost	Points for	Points against	Tries for	Tries against	Try bonus	Losing bonus	Points
Pontyberem RFC	22	21	0	1	614	223	84	26	12	1	97
Aberystwyth RFC	22	18	1	3	677	277	100	32	12	0	86
Crymych RFC	22	17	1	4	656	239	88	27	11	2	83
Cardigan RFC	22	14	0	8	631	221	94	20	11	3	70
Laugharne RFC	22	13	1	8	603	342	86	47	11	5	70
Newcastle Emlyn RFC	22	11	0	11	469	422	61	54	6	2	52
Llanybydder RFC^{1}	22	11	0	11	499	348	71	39	8	5	49
Haverfordwest RFC	22	8	1	13	391	467	51	59	3	3	40
Lampeter Town RFC	22	8	0	14	375	616	41	91	3	2	37
Llanelli Wanderers RFC	22	6	0	16	347	694	48	99	5	2	31
Amman United RFC	22	2	0	20	237	821	29	117	2	4	14
Tumble RFC	22	1	0	21	184	1013	20	162	0	2	6
Correct as of 2009-06-02

^{1} Llanybydder were deducted 8 points for playing and then winning a match with an ineligible player

== 2007/2008 season ==
=== League Teams ===
- Aberystwyth RFC
- Amman United RFC
- Ammanford RFC
- Cardigan RFC
- Cwmgors RFC
- Haverfordwest RFC
- Lampeter Town RFC
- Laugharne RFC
- Llanelli Wanderers RFC
- Llanybydder RFC
- Newcastle Emlyn RFC
- Pembroke Dock Harlequins RFC

=== 2007/2008 Table ===
2007-08 WRU Division Three West Table
Club	Played	Won	Drawn	Lost	Points for	Points against	Tries for	Tries against	Try bonus	Losing bonus	Points
Ammanford RFC	22	19	0	3	691	307	90	38	11	1	88
Cardigan RFC	22	16	1	5	402	220	57	23	7	1	74
Laugharne RFC	22	15	1	6	519	344	69	43	7	5	74
Llanybydder RFC	22	15	0	7	449	232	55	25	4	5	69
Aberystwyth RFC	22	15	0	7	528	297	67	37	6	2	68
Llanelli Wanderers RFC	22	9	0	13	350	456	49	59	4	4	44
Lampeter Town RFC	22	10	0	12	269	408	27	52	1	2	43
Haverfordwest RFC	22	9	0	13	307	336	36	42	1	5	42
Newcastle Emlyn RFC	22	7	0	15	308	464	34	65	1	7	36
Amman United RFC	22	6	0	16	327	389	38	46	3	7	34
Pembroke Dock Harlequins RFC	22	7	0	15	275	531	37	67	2	3	33
Cwmgors RFC	22	3	0	19	209	650	28	90	2	5	19
Correct as of 2008-05-31

== 2006/2007 season ==
=== League Teams ===
- Aberystwyth RFC
- Ammanford RFC
- Haverfordwest RFC
- Lampeter Town RFC
- Laugharne RFC
- Llanelli Wanderers RFC
- Llangefni RFC
- Newcastle Emlyn RFC
- Pembroke Dock Harlequins RFC
- Pontarddulais RFC
- Trimsaran RFC
- Tumble RFC

=== 2006/2007 Table ===
2006-07 WRU Division Three League West Table
Club	Played	Won	Drawn	Lost	Points for	Points against	TF	Points
Tumble RFC	22	19	0	3	688	248	95	57
Llangefni RFC	22	17	1	4	518	327	75	52
Aberystwyth RFC	22	16	1	5	566	322	79	49
Llanelli Wanderers RFC	22	13	0	9	444	407	67	39
Newcastle Emlyn RFC	22	11	0	11	437	375	50	33
Lampeter Town RFC	22	11	0	11	438	415	49	33
Laugharne RFC	22	10	1	11	483	496	61	31
Ammanford RFC	22	8	1	13	441	507	52	25
Pembroke Dock Harlequins RFC	22	8	0	14	394	620	56	24
Haverfordwest RFC	22	7	0	15	309	473	43	21
Trimsaran RFC	22	6	0	16	285	468	39	18
Pontarddulais RFC	22	4	0	18	363	708	48	12
Correct as of 2007-08-15
