= Newcastle Emlyn RFC =

Welsh rugby union club

(Wales) Newcastle Emlyn RFC
- Full name: Clwb Rygbi Castell Newydd Emlyn
- Union: Welsh Rugby Union
- Nickname(s): Red and Whites
- Founded: 1977; 49 years ago
- Location: Newcastle Emlyn, Wales
- Ground: Dôl Wiber
- League: Welsh Championship West
- 2024-2025: Welsh Premier Division, 13th (relegated)
Team kit

Official website
- newcastleemlyn.rfc.wales

Newcastle Emlyn RFC (Welsh: Clwb Rygbi Castell Newydd Emlyn) is a Welsh rugby union club based on the outskirts of the town of Newcastle Emlyn, in the community of Adpar, Ceredigion on the north bank of the River Teifi. The club currently plays in the WRU Division One West (Known as Specsavers 1 West for sponsorship purposes) having spent 4 seasons in the Welsh Championship following the title win in 2015. The club is a feeder club for the Llanelli Scarlets.

== Club history ==
The club was formed on 5 July 1977 following a public meeting held at the Emlyn Hall, Newcastle Emlyn which agreed that it should be named in Welsh Clwb Rygbi Castell Newydd Emlyn and that the red and white hooped jerseys worn by the football club should be adopted.
Mike Heycock of Felingeri Flour Mill, Cwmcou donated a set of jerseys and became the club's first President.
The first games were played at Gelligatti fields next to the town cemetery. Four pine trees were felled in Cwm Morgan and transported by coal lorry to the town where they were stripped and painted in the club's colours for use as goal posts. The Headmaster of Emlyn School helped by allowing the use of the changing facilities and the occasional use of the school's pitches for second team games.
The club's H.Q. was established at the 'Red Cow' in Adpar and the old disused stables, 'Y Stabal', became the committee room, tea room, and changing room.

Clive Griffiths of Llanelli RFC was the team's first coach who went on to become the Wales defence coach under Graham Henry and subsequently Mike Ruddock.

On Saturday 4 September 1977 Clwb Rygbi Castell Newydd Emlyn played its first game of rugby union football. The first team played at Laugharne against their 2nd XV and the Emlyn 2nd XV played a Cardigan 3rd team at the Secondary School field in Cardigan.

Although affiliated to the Llanelli and District Junior Rugby Union the club did not play in the league in its first year of existence but during the season, 1977/78, the 1st XV had played 37 games achieving ten wins and two draws with the first victory on 1 October against Fishguard, 7–0. The Second XV played fourteen matches with one victory.

At the beginning of the 1978/79 season the club moved to a field on Cwrcoed Meadows, which was large enough for two pitches and training lights were also installed. The First XV played in the newly formed Section E of Llanelli and District and were promoted as runners-up behind Carmarthen Athletic Druids, in addition they reached the semi-finals of the Llanelli and District Cup. The Geraint Howells Knockout Cup for local teams was won by Emlyn in the 1987/88 season.

The 1980s saw a period of consolidation. The First XV were promoted to Section C of Llanelli and District, in 1979/80 and remained there for the next few seasons. By the 1987/88 season the club was playing in Section A of Llanelli and District and finished as Runners-up in the Championship.

At the end of the season 1988/89 the club was admitted as probationary members of the Welsh Rugby Union.

In November 2011, a new clubhouse at Dol Wiber was officially opened by the WRU President, Mr. Dennis Gethin. It is a purpose-built building capable of hosting formal dinners for 180, parties, fund raisers etc. and is available for community use.

== The club crest ==
The dragon on the club badge represents Gwiber Emlyn (The Emlyn Wyvern) which originally was a banner with a large red dragon emblazoned on it, the banner of Owain Glyndŵr.

The legend of Gwiber Castell Newydd Emlyn (the Wyvern of Newcastle Emlyn) is a local tradition. It tells how on one of the fair days when the town was full of people a fierce winged viper called a wyvern breathing fire and smoke, alighted on the castle walls and having cast threatening glances around settled down to sleep. Its appearance on the castle at first brought terror to all but after the fear had died down a few brave townsfolk sought to destroy the fearsome monster. A soldier devised the plan of wading the river Teifi to a point of vantage on the castle side and letting a red cloak float in the river and shooting the gwiber in a vulnerable under part of the body. The creature, so violently startled from its slumber, caught sight of the cloak and fell upon it with horrible shrieks and tore it to shreds. The assailant meanwhile, escaped to a place of safety. The wyvern in its death throes turned onto its back and floated down the river. From its wound gushed forth a most loathsome venom which polluted the water and killed all the fish. The legend tells of the great joy of the townsfolk when they saw the monster dead.

== Junior rugby ==
Age grade rugby has always been played at the club. In the season 1980/81 the junior team won the Pembrokeshire Mini Cup Competition and went on to play the final rounds at the National Stadium in Cardiff. The Minis or Junior section has continued to grow with the club now fielding teams at all ages from 7 to 16.

== Youth rugby ==
In 1983/84 the Youth XV was formed under the coaching of the former Llanelli prop Huw Jones. The Youth team has produced players not only feeding into the senior sides but also winning county and district caps.

The club has also had two players who have gained Welsh Youth Caps, namely Huw Morris and Rhys Jones. The former was selected to play second row for the Welsh Youth against the England Colts, at Leicester, on 3 April 1987.

Rhys Jones played for the Welsh Youth in 1990/91, against France, Japan, and England, and went on the Welsh Under 19 Tour to Canada and played in a test match. Josh Turnbull was part of the 2006 Wales Under 19 Grand Slam winning team and captained the side against Ireland and France in February 2007. In January 2011 he was named the Wales national rugby union team for the 2011 Six Nations Championship and made his international debut 12 February 2011 in the 24–6 win against Scotland as a second-half replacement.

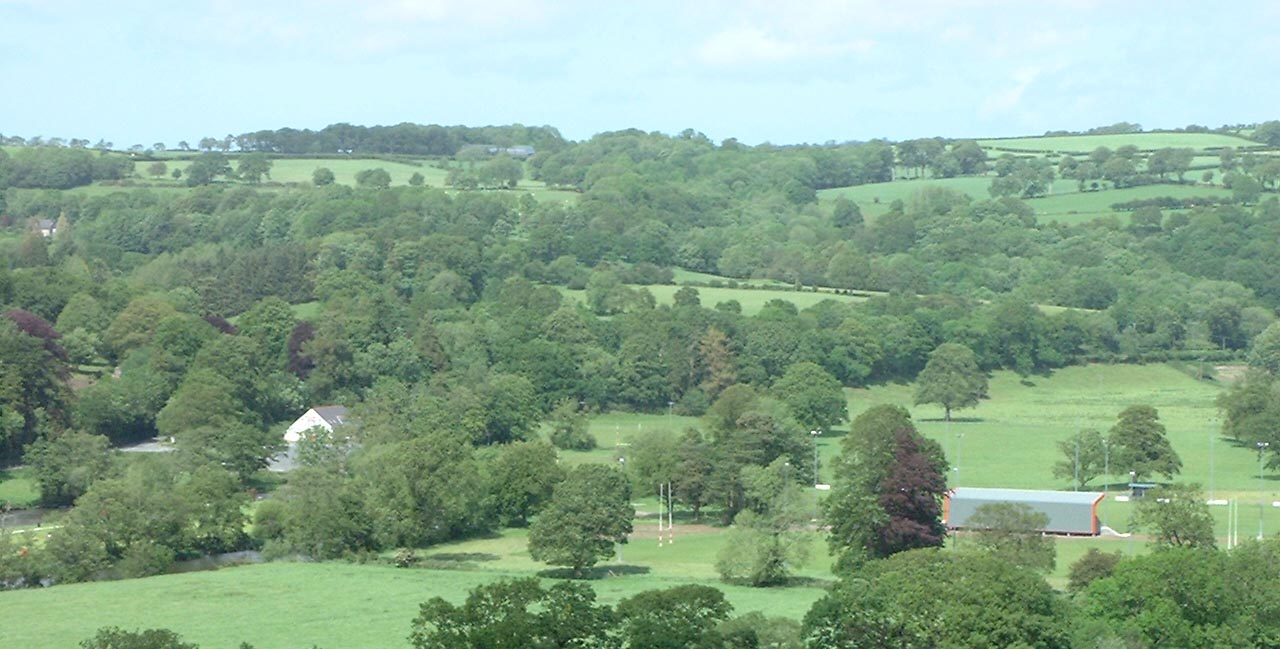
Dôl Wiber Playing Fields, Adpar

== Playing facilities ==
During 1991 it became apparent that in order to develop its playing facilities to the standard required the club needed to purchase playing fields. An agreement was reached to purchase 16 acres (65,000 m^{2}) of land which was developed into three rugby pitches, one floodlit, a car park and changing rooms.

On 27 August 1992, Neath RFC played a 'trial' match on the new fields and on Saturday 4 October 1992 the official opening ceremony of the field, floodlights and changing rooms was performed by the Welsh Rugby Union Chairman and Treasurer Mr. Glanmor Griffiths. A 250-seater stand with seats from the former Cardiff Arms Park has also been completed.

== Honours ==
- WRU Division Three West 2009/10 – Champions
- WRU Division Three West 2012/13 – Runners up
- West Wales Rugby Union Brains SA Bowl Winners 2012/13
- WRU Division Two West 2013/14 – Runners up
- Swalec Plate 2014/15 – Runners up
- WRU Division One West 2014/15 – Champions
- WRU Scarlets Region Plate Joint Winners 2021/22
- West Wales Rugby Union Towergate Cup Winners 2021/22
