= Amman United RFC =

Welsh rugby union club, based in Amman, near Swansea

(Wales) Amman United RFC
- Full name: Amman United Rugby Football Club
- Founded: 1903; 123 years ago
- Location: Garnant, Wales
- Ground: Cwmamman Park (Capacity: 500)
- Coach(es): Adrian Thomas & Sean Caddell
- Captain: Sean Mangan
- League: WRU 3 West B
- 2016-17: 1st
Team kit

Official website
- www.pitchero.com/clubs/ammanutd

Amman United Rugby Football Club (Welsh: Yr Aman) is a Welsh rugby union team from the Amman valley north of Swansea. The club plays at Cwmamman Recreation Ground between Garnant and Glanamman; before the coal-mining boom the two towns were a single village called Cwmamman.

The club is a member of the Welsh Rugby Union and is a feeder club for the Scarlets regional team. Amman United has supplied several players to the Wales rugby union team including Claude Davey and Tom Day and in Trevor Evans and Shane Williams, members of the British and Irish Lions.

Amman United came second in the WRU Division Four West and were promoted in 2012; by the end of the year they were leading WRU Division Three West. In 2017 Amman UTD won the national bowl in Principality Stadium and also were crowned champions of WRU Division 3B West undefeated.

== Notable former players ==
- (Wales) Tom Day
- (Wales) Carwyn James
- (Wales) Trevor Evans
- (Wales) Joe Rees
- (Wales) William "Billo" Rees
- (Wales) Shane Williams
- Dai Davies
- Ted Ward
- Gav Lewis British Army & Combined Services
- Joel Foster RAF & Combined Services
- Iwan Davies RAF
