= Llandeilo RFC =

Welsh rugby union club, based in Carmarthenshire, Wales

(Wales) Llandeilo RFC
- Full name: Llandeilo Rugby Football Club
- Founded: 1871; 155 years ago
- Location: Llandeilo, Wales
- Ground: Cae William
- League: WRU Division Three West
- 2011–12: 4th
Team kit

Llandeilo Rugby Football Club is a rugby union team from the town of Llandeilo, in Carmarthenshire, west Wales. The club is a member of the Welsh Rugby Union and is a feeder club for the Scarlets.

== History ==
=== Early history ===
A Carmarthen Journal from 1871 first confirms the existence of Llandeilo RFC; when it covered an event between the club and three other teams, namely Neath, Lampeter College and Llandovery College. In their inaugural year Llandeilo RFC played on a ground known as the Bridge Field. Due to the death of one of their players, rugby in Llandeilo appeared to wane and the game lost support. But in 1875 interest was rekindled by locals, and rugby was once again played, but now on Gurrey Fach Field.

Competitive Rugby was first played by Llandeilo in the 1877–78 season when the club entered the South Wales Challenge Cup competition as one of the inaugurating teams; and on 12 March 1881, Llandeilo RFC was one of the eleven clubs who met in Neath to found the Welsh Rugby Union.

George Davies was the first player to graduate from Llandeilo RFC to play for his Wales. He joined Swansea RFC in 1898 and became a Welsh international in 1899–1900, winning three caps (awarded for playing at an international level) against the other home nations during that season. He won a further six caps playing in the 1901 and 1905 Triple Crown sides.

=== 1914 to 1945 ===
Rugby came to a standstill from 1914 until 1919, during World War I but on the cessation of hostilities in 1919, rugby returned to Llandeilo. It was in 1919 that their president, the Rt. Hon. Lord Dynevor, provided Cae William to become the club's permanent ground. In the early 1920s support for rugby union in the area lessened. The advent of association football was a particular draw to the youth of the town and Llandeilo RFC were forced into liquidation and they did not renew their membership of the WRU. From 1925 to 1934 no competitive rugby union was played at Llandeilo; but in 1934 a game was organised and played against Haverfordwest RFC.

=== Post 1945 ===
After World War II, Llandeilo RFC applied to and successfully joined the Llanelli and District Junior Rugby Union. It was during this period that they won their first trophy in 1953–54, the Llanelli and District Rugby Union Knock-out Cup. In 1949, Llandeilo were once again members of the WRU and during this time club membership flourished; and in 1954 the club became members of the West Wales Rugby Union in 1954, but their progress in the West Wales Rugby Union was fairly poor over the next ten years without any significant success.

In 1969, Llandeilo's new clubhouse was opened; and in the 70's Llandeilo Athletic club purchased Cae William on behalf of Llandeilo RFC.

=== Modern day ===
In the 1986–87 season, Llandeilo RFC won Section E of the West Wales Rugby Union Championship. The club also reformed the junior sections, which allowed a basis for future talent and growth.

During the 1990s the club experienced some success on the field but controversy off it. By 1993 the club found itself in the Premier Division of the WWRU for the very first time, but in the early months of 1993 the club found itself in the midst of a criminal investigation. A fund raising attempt by the club resulted in the defaulting of payments by certain sponsors. Eventually the WRU and police were informed and the Welsh media investigated the story. On investigation it transpired that the club had a higher allocation of International Tickets than the committee had been led to believe, and in the aftermath, club secretary Joe Harries resigned.

The 1995–96 season saw the introduction of professionalism and the National Leagues; Llandeilo were placed in Division 6 West.

The year 2000 saw a new 100-seater stand facility opened at Cae William.; which was unveiled by Llanelli star player Ray Gravell.

The 2008/09 season saw Llandeilo get promoted with an unbeaten season.

As of the season 2022–23, Llandeilo currently play in the Admiral National League 3 West B.

== Club honours ==
- 2008/09 WRU Division Four West - Champions

== Notable former players ==
- (Wales) George Davies (9 caps)
- (Denmark) Robert Davies, second row (56 caps) 1999–present
- Christian Roets, wing/centre (Wales Rugby League)
