= Cardigan RFC =

Welsh rugby union team

(Wales) Cardigan RFC
- Full name: Cardigan Rugby Football Club
- Nickname(s): Cardis, Cards
- Founded: 1876
- Location: Cardigan, Wales
- Ground: King George IV
- President: Graham Rees
- Coach(es): Rob Evans & Sion Edwards
- Captain: Marcus Castle
- League: WRU Division Three West
- 2024-25: 5th
Team kit

Official website
- baeceredigion.rfc.wales

Cardigan Rugby Football Club is a rugby union team from the town of Cardigan, West Wales. The club is a member of the Welsh Rugby Union and is a feeder club for the Llanelli Scarlets.

== History ==
Rugby came to Cardigan through the local Free Grammar School in the 1860s when games were arranged against fellow Welsh colleges Lampeter and Llandovery. The rugby club itself was founded in 1876 making the team one of the oldest in Wales, and initially they played in an Oxford Blue strip.

As with all Welsh rugby club teams, Cardigan RFC disbanded during the First World War, but the club reformed in the 1920-21 through ex-servicemen. The club disbanded again during the Second World War, but after reforming for a second time they gained membership of the Welsh Rugby Union in 1956. In 1967 a new clubhouse was built but this burned down in 1969, though rebuilt later that year. In 1992 floodlights and a 350 all-weather stand were introduced to the pitch.

Welsh cup runners up 2025/25 first time for the 1sts senior side reaching this prestigious cup final losing to Newport Saracens RFC Current kit colours are Red, Black, Yellow
