= Callum Woolley =

Welsh rugby union player

- Born: 15 September 2005 (age 21) Cardigan, Wales
- Height: 193 cm (6 ft 4 in)
- Weight: 101 kg (223 lb)
- School: Ysgol Uwchradd Aberteifi, City of Oxford College

Rugby union career
- Position: Wing
- Current team: Scarlets
Youth career
- Cardigan RFC
Senior career
Years	Team	Apps	(Points)
2024–	Carmarthen Quins	12	(30)
2026–	Scarlets	1	(5)
National sevens team
Years	Team		Comps
2026	Great Britain		2

Callum Woolley (born 15 September 2005) is a Welsh rugby union player who plays for the Scarlets as a wing.

== Early life ==
Born in Cardigan, Woolley played for Cardigan RFC, and attended Cardigan Secondary School before going to City of Oxford College.

== Club career ==
=== Carmarthen Quins ===
Woolley played for local sides Llangennech RFC and Carmarthen Quins. His form was noticed during the 2025–26 season, scoring a hat trick for Llangennech against Neath. For Carmarthen he scored a hat trick against Cardiff followed by a brace in the following fixture against Llandovery.

=== Scarlets ===
Despite leaving the region, Woolley was persuaded to return, and in 2024 was selected as part of the Scarlets under-18s squad. Woolley featured in summer friendlies before missing the Regional Age Group campaign due to injury. He joined the Scarlets Academy ahead of the 2024–25 season. During the season, Woolley was named on the bench for a Scarlets Development XV fixture against the Dragons.

Woolley was named in the squad to play in a friendly against Llandovery and Carmarthen ahead of the 2025–26 United Rugby Championship.

In April 2026 he was tipped by interim director of rugby Nigel Davies to make his debut for the Scarlets, and was being mentored by former Scarlet Liam Williams. He was named to start against the Bulls, and made his competitive debut on 25 April 2026, scoring the first try for the Scarlets.

Woolley featured in preseason fixtures against Exeter Chiefs and Dragons.

== International career ==
=== Great Britain Sevens ===
In February 2026, Woolley was selected by Great Britain national rugby sevens team, for the Singapore leg of the SVNS series. He scored two tries in his first tournament, and featured in the next round in Perth.
