= Shane Williams =

Wales and British Lions international rugby union player

Shane Williams MBE
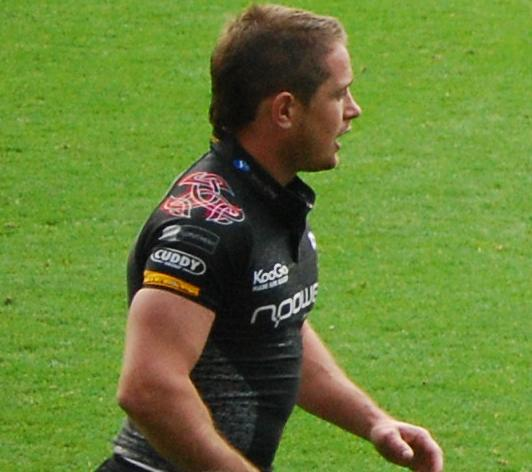
- Williams in October 2008
- Full name: Shane Mark Williams
- Born: 26 February 1977 (age 49) Morriston, Swansea, Wales
- Height: 1.70 m (5 ft 7 in)
- Weight: 80 kg (180 lb; 12 st 8 lb)
- School: Amman Valley School

Rugby union career
- Position(s): Wing; Scrum-half
Youth career
- ?–1998: Amman United
Senior career
Years	Team	Apps	(Points)
1998–2003	Neath	129	(612)
2003–2012	Ospreys	141	(293)
2012–2015	Mitsubishi	10	(30)
International career
Years	Team	Apps	(Points)
2000–2011	Wales	87	(290)
2005–2013	British & Irish Lions	4	(10)

Shane Mark Williams, MBE (born 26 February 1977) is a Welsh former rugby union player most famous for his long and successful tenure as a wing for the Ospreys and the Wales national team. He also played scrum-half on occasion. Williams is the record try scorer for Wales, and fourth on the international list of leading rugby union test try scorers behind Daisuke Ohata, Bryan Habana and David Campese.

In 2008, Williams was selected as the World Rugby Player of the Year, then known as the IRB Player of the Year.

Since his retirement from international rugby in 2012, Williams has worked as a presenter on S4C's Six Nations rugby programme Y Clwb Rygbi Rhyngwladol, and as a pundit on BBC, ITV and Channel 4 broadcasts as well as third party shows such as "Inside Welsh Rugby", commenting on the grassroots of Welsh rugby. Williams was selected to the Barbarians squad that played Wales in June 2012. It was originally planned to be his last appearance as a player, but he shortly thereafter signed a one-year contract to play in Japan with Mitsubishi Sagamihara DynaBoars in June 2012. Williams was appointed Member of the Order of the British Empire (MBE) in the 2012 Birthday Honours for services to rugby. Williams extended his stay in Japan several times, taking on a role as player-coach and turning down an offer from French Top 14 side Toulon in the process. Before finally announcing he would be returning home at the end of the 2014–15 Japanese Top League season.

In November 2016, Williams was inducted into the World Rugby Hall of Fame during opening ceremonies for the Hall's first physical home in Rugby, Warwickshire.

== Early life ==
Williams was born in Morriston in Swansea, but grew up in Glanamman in the Amman Valley. He picked up his first rugby ball while still in primary school, and was always small for his age, even going into secondary school at Amman Valley Comprehensive School (now Ysgol Dyffryn Aman). Told that he was too small to play rugby, Williams took up football instead, playing for Cwmamman United A.F.C.; in his first appearance for the club's junior team, Williams had to play in goal as no one else would volunteer to take the position. Williams' former junior football coach, Alun Rees, remembers him as a "superb goalkeeper", but notes that he could also play outfield. Williams played for Cwmamman United up to the senior level, while only playing rugby sporadically, and admits that, at the time, football was "[his] main sport". However, on the day of Cwmamman United's cup final, Williams was invited to play rugby with his friends at Amman United RFC; Amman United ended up winning by 82 points, with Williams scoring five tries.

== Club career ==
Williams started his junior career as a scrum-half at Amman United he joined Neath as a second-choice scrum-half. However, it became apparent to Lyn Jones, Neath's then-coach, that Williams simply could not be left out of the side, and placed him on the right wing, opposite Delme Williams on the left. However, Delme Williams had shown a tendency not to kick and chase the ball, resulting in him and Shane swapping wings.

When it came to Williams signing his first professional contract with Neath, Amman United demanded a transfer fee for him, resulting in negotiations between the two clubs. Nevertheless, Williams eventually signed for Neath on a contract worth approximately £7,500 per annum, equivalent to his wage at the local Job Centre where he was working part-time.

In his final Ospreys match at the Liberty Stadium he finished his career there in a similar style as he did with Wales scoring a try past the 80-minute mark and converted his own try for his final bow at the Liberty. Williams then, in his last game of professional club rugby, scored 2 tries for the Ospreys in the PRO12 final 30–31 win against Leinster. This included one in the 78th minute to give Dan Biggar what proved to be the winning conversion.

Williams planned to retire from rugby and join Ospreys' backroom staff, but received an offer to play one season in Japan with Mitsubishi Sagamihara DynaBoars, in the second division of the Japanese league system. The Ospreys gave him their blessing for the move, and he took up his staff role with that club upon the expiry of his Japanese contract.

He officially retired from playing at the end of the 2013/14 season, although he returned to play for his home village club, Amman United during the 2016 – 2017 season, including a try-scoring appearance in the 2017 WRU Bowl final at the Millennium Stadium. He now works as a commentator and pundit.

== International career ==
Williams was awarded his first cap for Wales by Graham Henry as a replacement against France in the 2000 Six Nations season, he was three weeks short of his 23rd birthday and weighed a little over 11 stone. He scored in his first full start for Wales with a try against Italy in the same Six Nations tournament and went on to score a total of 60 international tries (58 for Wales, 2 for the British & Irish Lions). Williams is also Wales' record try scorer in Six Nations Championships with 22 and Wales' record try scorer in Rugby World Cups with 10. In addition, he has scored six tries for the Lions in tour games, five of which were in one game.

He suffered a series of hamstring injuries in 2002 and did not often figure in Steve Hansen's squad. He considered quitting rugby entirely at this time.

He was taken to the 2003 Rugby World Cup in Australia as a third choice scrum half. He was selected in the final group game against New Zealand as Wales made numerous changes to their starting fifteen. It was in this game and the following against England that he really showed his world class potential and ensured that he would be a first choice winger for Wales from this point onwards.

He was part of the Grand Slam-winning Wales side in the 2005 Six Nations Championship, where he scored tries against Italy, Scotland, and most famously England, the try that helped them achieve a famous 11–9 victory that got their campaign underway. He was then selected to the British & Irish Lions for their 2005 New Zealand tour. On 28 June, he equalled a single-game Lions record by scoring five tries in a tour match against Manawatu.

In the summer of 2007, Williams underwent elbow and shoulder surgery and missed the tour of Australia. However, he did return in time to play the last Rugby World Cup warm up game against France. During the 2007 Rugby World Cup, Williams earned his 50th cap against Japan. He scored two tries in that match, temporarily putting him on top of the 2007 Rugby World Cup try-scoring table with a total of five tries. The tries also put him above Ieuan Evans on the all-time Wales try scoring list, trailing only Gareth Thomas at that time. His try against France in their 2008 Six Nations Championship decider on 15 March 2008 placed him joint eighth on the all-time test try scoring list with Thomas, and surpassed Thomas on the all-time Wales try scoring list.

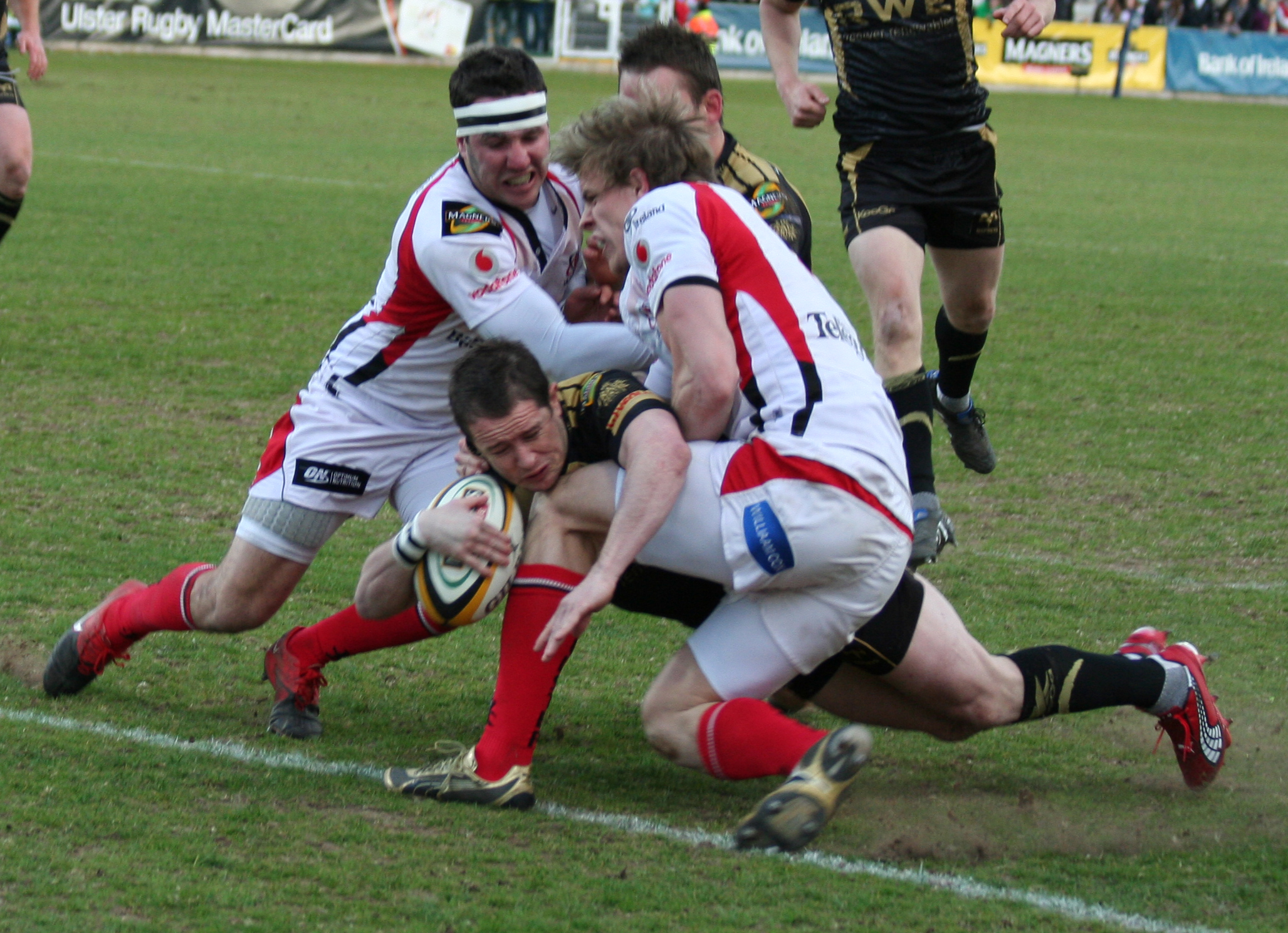
Williams scores a try for the Ospreys away to Ulster in April 2010.

He participated in a second Grand Slam win with Wales in the 2008 Six Nations Championship, when he scored tries against Scotland (twice), Italy (twice), Ireland, and France, breaking the record on the all-time Wales try scoring list in the championship's final match against France, when he scored his 41st try for Wales. This try resulted in his father Mark Williams winning £25,000 from a £50 bet placed almost 10 years previously that he'd one day become Wales' leading try scorer. His performances in the Six Nations led to him being named the player of the tournament.

On 23 November 2008, Williams became the first Welshman to be named IRB Player of the Year, beating fellow Welshman Ryan Jones, New Zealand's Dan Carter, Scotland captain Mike Blair, and Italy captain Sergio Parisse.

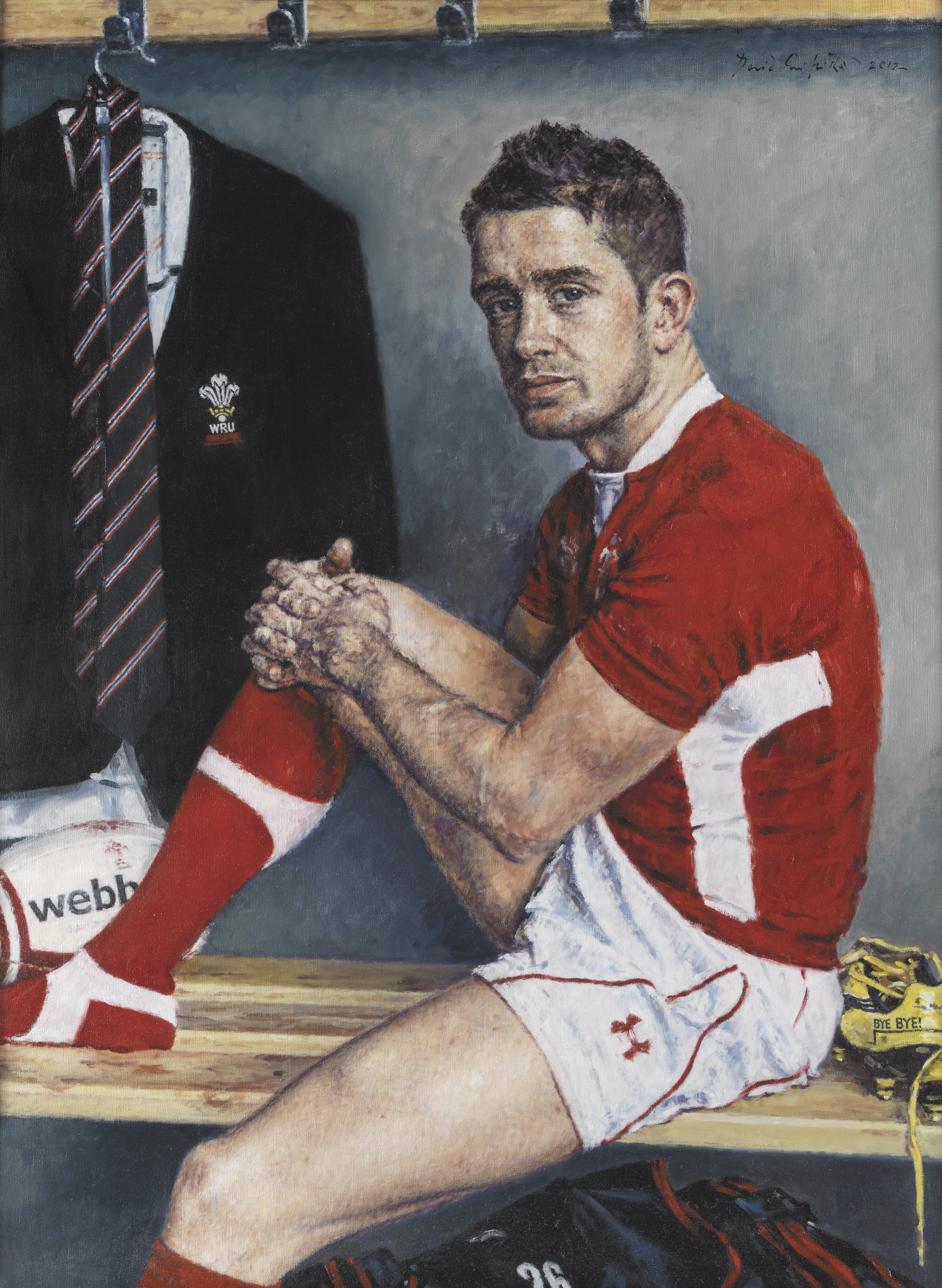
A 2012 portrait of Williams by portrait artist David Griffiths

On 7 December 2008, he won the BBC Cymru Wales Sports Personality of the Year, seeing off the competition of Tom James, David Roberts, Geraint Thomas and runners up Joe Calzaghe and Nicole Cooke.

In his first 2009 Six Nations game against Scotland he scored his 45th test try to take him above Jeff Wilson on the all-time leading try scorers list to sixth. During the game he received an ankle injury and was taken off the pitch. Following the injury he missed the next game against England, but would start for Wales' third game against France. In the fourth game of the championship, Williams scored Wales' opening try against Italy to take himself to equal fifth on the all-time leading try scorers list.

On 21 April 2009, Williams was named as a member of the British & Irish Lions for the 2009 tour to South Africa. Williams missed out on a starting place in the first two Tests but was selected to play in the final Test where he produced a man-of-the-match winning performance and scored two tries that contributed to the 28–9 victory over the Springboks.

On 21 November 2009, Williams scored two tries in Wales' comfortable 33–16 win over Argentina in the Millennium Stadium, taking his international try tally to 50.

On 13 February 2010, Williams scored the winning try against Scotland in Cardiff, completing a remarkable Welsh comeback. Wales trailed 24–14 with 4 minutes remaining in the game, and Williams' try on the last play of the game took the final score to 31–24 to Wales. It was Williams' 49th international try for Wales (51st in all internationals), and his 18th in the Six Nations, equalling the record by a Welshman in the tournament, held by Gareth Edwards.

On 26 February 2010, Williams again scored in the final minute in the 26–20 loss to France. This score handed him sole position of tries scored by a Welshman in the tournament with 19 tries for his country. He would subsequently increase his Six Nations tally to 22 tries.

He was a part of the 2011 Rugby World Cup squad in New Zealand and scored three tries. One of them being scored in the quarter final against Ireland in Wellington. Wales reached the semi-finals.

Williams stated that he would retire from playing for Wales after the 2011 Rugby World Cup but later decided to play against Australia on 3 December 2011. Williams' last Wales match ended in him scoring a final try to round off his glittering career. He scored his 58th try with the very last touch of his international career in added time as the game finished 24–18 to Australia. He said that wearing the Welsh jersey was the "best feeling ever".

In 2013 Williams was heading out to Australia to commentate on the British & Irish Lions test games. On 15 June 2013, Williams was called up to the Lions squad to face the ACT Brumbies.

== Personal life ==
In August 2005, a holiday to Cyprus made the headlines when Williams was erroneously held over an assault. The police lost his passport; his lawyer described the whole incident as a "total stitch-up"; and on his return to the United Kingdom, Williams suggested that he should have spent his holiday in Tenby instead.

On 23 December 2005, Williams married his childhood sweetheart, Gail Branwen Lacey, whom he had met at Amman Valley School 14 years previously, at Twyn Church in Garnant. The couple have two children.

== Honours ==
=== Individual ===
IRB Player of the Year - 2008

== Points record ==
Statistics as of 3 May 2008, taken from the official site of the Ospreys, as of 22 April 2012 taken from the official site of the Welsh Rugby Union and the British & Irish Lions.

Team	Games	Tries	Conversions	Penalties	Drop goals	Total points
Neath	129	71	40	59	0	612
Ospreys	141	57	1	0	2	293
Wales	87	58	0	0	0	290
British & Irish Lions tests	4	2	0	0	0	10
British & Irish Lions tour matches	7	6	0	0	0	30
Total	368	194	41	59	2	974

=== International tries ===
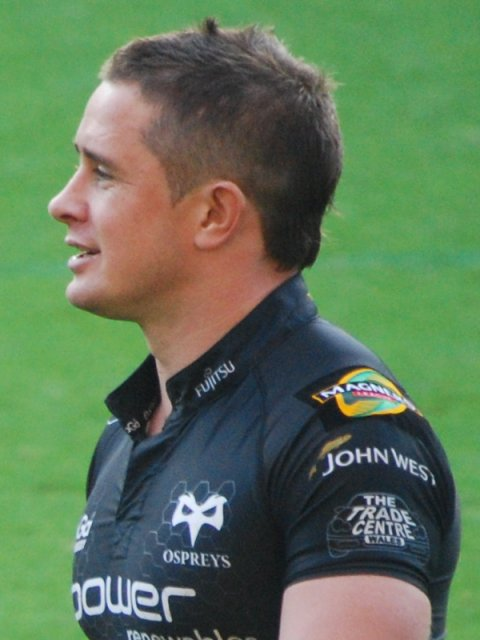
Shane Williams, pictured in 2008 with his club team, Ospreys

Playing exclusively as a wing for Wales, Williams scored 58 tries, the most for any Wales international and 13 more than second-placed George North. Williams also made four appearances for the British & Irish Lions, three as a wing and one as a centre. Williams scored two tries for the Lions, both from the wing during their victory over South Africa (also known as the 'Springboks') in the third Test of their 2009 tour of South Africa. At his retirement, Williams' 60 international tries placed him third on the worldwide all-time list, trailing Daisuke Ohata of Japan and David Campese of Australia; as of March 2018, he stands fourth, with South Africa's Bryan Habana having surpassed Williams and Campese for second place.

Williams made his international debut on 5 February 2000 against France in the opening round of the 2000 Six Nations Championship at Millennium Stadium in Cardiff. His first try for Wales came in the next round of the Six Nations against Italy, also at Millennium Stadium. Williams went on to score tries in the 2003, 2007 and 2011 editions of the World Cup. His final try for Wales came literally at the end of his international career, as he scored on the final play of his last Test on 3 December 2011 against Australia at Millennium Stadium. This try was his 28th at Millennium Stadium, surpassing Rory Underwood of England, with 27 at Twickenham, for the most international tries scored by a player from one of the ten "Tier 1" nations at a single ground. Among players from all nations, Williams is level with Ohata, who scored 28 tries at Chichibunomiya Rugby Stadium in Tokyo.

Williams holds several other try records, both for Wales and internationally. His 30 tries away from his home country (including those at neutral sites) were the most for any player in history at the time of his retirement, though that record has since been broken by Habana. He leads Wales in tries at home (30), away (21), on neutral ground (7), and in the Rugby World Cup (10). Williams was most prolific against Italy, Japan and Scotland, scoring nine tries against each team; he retired with the record for most tries by an opposing player against each of these nations. He also retired with the most tries by any European player against both Australia (6) and South Africa (5). All of his tries against the Springboks were on South African soil, which at the time of his retirement tied him with New Zealanders Christian Cullen and Joe Rokocoko for the most overall. His six tries against Argentina left him level with France's Serge Blanco and Émile Ntamack for the most by a European player.

Williams has scored multiple tries in a single international match on 14 occasions, including two hat-tricks. The first of these was a four-try effort against Japan at Kintetsu Hanazono Rugby Stadium in Osaka during a 2001 Wales tour. The second was against Argentina at José Amalfitani Stadium in Buenos Aires during Wales' 2004 tour. Williams scored tries against 14 countries, including all of the other nine "Tier 1" nations.

Key:

- Won denotes that the match was won by the side for which Williams was playing.
- Lost denotes that the match was lost by the side for which Williams was playing.
- Drawn denotes that the match was drawn.
- ‡ denotes tries that were scored while playing for the British & Irish Lions.

International rugby union tries by Shane Williams
Try	Opposing team	Venue	Competition	Date	Result	Score	Ref(s).
1	Italy	Millennium Stadium, Cardiff	2000 Six Nations Championship	19 February 2000	Won	47–16	
2	Scotland	Millennium Stadium, Cardiff	2000 Six Nations Championship	18 March 2000	Won	26–18	
3	Scotland	Millennium Stadium, Cardiff	2000 Six Nations Championship	18 March 2000	Won	26–18	
4	Samoa	Millennium Stadium, Cardiff	Test match	11 November 2000	Won	50–6	
5	Samoa	Millennium Stadium, Cardiff	Test match	11 November 2000	Won	50–6	
6	Japan	Kintetsu Hanazono Rugby Stadium, Osaka	Test match	10 June 2001	Won	64–10	
7	Japan	Kintetsu Hanazono Rugby Stadium, Osaka	Test match	10 June 2001	Won	64–10	
8	Japan	Kintetsu Hanazono Rugby Stadium, Osaka	Test match	10 June 2001	Won	64–10	
9	Japan	Kintetsu Hanazono Rugby Stadium, Osaka	Test match	10 June 2001	Won	64–10	
10	Japan	Chichibunomiya Rugby Stadium, Tokyo	Test match	17 June 2001	Won	53–30	
11	Romania	Racecourse Ground, Wrexham	Test match	27 August 2003	Won	54–8	
12	Romania	Racecourse Ground, Wrexham	Test match	27 August 2003	Won	54–8	
13	New Zealand	Stadium Australia, Sydney	2003 Rugby World Cup	2 November 2003	Lost	37–53	
14	Italy	Millennium Stadium, Cardiff	2004 Six Nations Championship	27 March 2004	Won	44–10	
15	Italy	Millennium Stadium, Cardiff	2004 Six Nations Championship	27 March 2004	Won	44–10	
16	Argentina	José Amalfitani Stadium, Buenos Aires	Test match	19 June 2004	Won	35–20	
17	Argentina	José Amalfitani Stadium, Buenos Aires	Test match	19 June 2004	Won	35–20	
18	Argentina	José Amalfitani Stadium, Buenos Aires	Test match	19 June 2004	Won	35–20	
19	South Africa	Loftus Versfeld, Pretoria	Test match	26 June 2004	Lost	18–53	
20	Japan	Millennium Stadium, Cardiff	Test match	26 November 2004	Won	98–0	
21	Japan	Millennium Stadium, Cardiff	Test match	26 November 2004	Won	98–0	
22	England	Millennium Stadium, Cardiff	2005 Six Nations Championship	5 February 2005	Won	11–9	
23	Italy	Stadio Flaminio, Rome	2005 Six Nations Championship	12 February 2005	Won	38–8	
24	Scotland	Murrayfield, Edinburgh	2005 Six Nations Championship	13 March 2005	Won	46–22	
25	Australia	Millennium Stadium, Cardiff	Test match	26 November 2005	Won	24–22	
26	Argentina	José Amalfitani Stadium, Buenos Aires	Test match	17 June 2006	Lost	27–45	
27	Australia	Millennium Stadium, Cardiff	Test match	4 November 2006	Drawn	29–29	
28	Canada	Millennium Stadium, Cardiff	Test match	17 November 2006	Won	61–26	
29	Italy	Stadio Flaminio, Rome	2007 Six Nations Championship	10 March 2007	Lost	20–23	
30	Canada	Stade de la Beaujoire, Nantes	2007 Rugby World Cup	9 September 2007	Won	42–17	
31	Canada	Stade de la Beaujoire, Nantes	2007 Rugby World Cup	9 September 2007	Won	42–17	
32	Australia	Millennium Stadium, Cardiff	2007 Rugby World Cup	15 September 2007	Lost	20–32	
33	Japan	Millennium Stadium, Cardiff	2007 Rugby World Cup	20 September 2007	Won	72–18	
34	Japan	Millennium Stadium, Cardiff	2007 Rugby World Cup	20 September 2007	Won	72–18	
35	Fiji	Stade de la Beaujoire, Nantes	2007 Rugby World Cup	29 September 2007	Lost	34–38	
36	Scotland	Millennium Stadium, Cardiff	2008 Six Nations Championship	9 February 2008	Won	30–15	
37	Scotland	Millennium Stadium, Cardiff	2008 Six Nations Championship	9 February 2008	Won	30–15	
38	Italy	Millennium Stadium, Cardiff	2008 Six Nations Championship	23 February 2008	Won	47–8	
39	Italy	Millennium Stadium, Cardiff	2008 Six Nations Championship	23 February 2008	Won	47–8	
40	Ireland	Croke Park, Dublin	2008 Six Nations Championship	8 March 2008	Won	16–12	
41	France	Millennium Stadium, Cardiff	2008 Six Nations Championship	15 March 2008	Won	29–12	
42	South Africa	Free State Stadium, Bloemfontein	Prince William Cup	7 June 2008	Lost	17–43	
43	South Africa	Loftus Versfeld, Pretoria	Prince William Cup	14 June 2008	Lost	21–37	
44	Australia	Millennium Stadium, Cardiff	James Bevan Trophy	29 November 2008	Won	21–18	
45	Scotland	Murrayfield, Edinburgh	2009 Six Nations Championship	8 February 2009	Won	26–13	
46	Italy	Stadio Flaminio, Rome	2009 Six Nations Championship	14 March 2009	Won	20–15	
47‡	South Africa	Ellis Park Stadium, Johannesburg	2009 British & Irish Lions tour to South Africa	4 July 2009	Won	28–9	
48‡	South Africa	Ellis Park Stadium, Johannesburg	2009 British & Irish Lions tour to South Africa	4 July 2009	Won	28–9	
49	Argentina	Millennium Stadium, Cardiff	Test match	21 November 2009	Won	33–16	
50	Argentina	Millennium Stadium, Cardiff	Test match	21 November 2009	Won	33–16	
51	Scotland	Millennium Stadium, Cardiff	2010 Six Nations Championship	13 February 2010	Won	31–24	
52	France	Millennium Stadium, Cardiff	2010 Six Nations Championship	26 February 2010	Lost	20–26	
53	Italy	Millennium Stadium, Cardiff	2010 Six Nations Championship	20 March 2010	Won	33–10	
54	Scotland	Murrayfield, Edinburgh	2011 Six Nations Championship	12 February 2011	Won	24–6	
55	Scotland	Murrayfield, Edinburgh	2011 Six Nations Championship	12 February 2011	Won	24–6	
56	England	Twickenham, London	Test match	6 August 2011	Lost	19–23	
57	Samoa	Waikato Stadium, Hamilton	2011 Rugby World Cup	18 September 2011	Won	17–10	
58	Ireland	Wellington Regional Stadium, Wellington	2011 Rugby World Cup	8 October 2011	Won	22–10	
59	Australia	Eden Park, Auckland	2011 Rugby World Cup	21 October 2011	Lost	18–21	
60	Australia	Millennium Stadium, Cardiff	James Bevan Trophy	3 December 2011	Lost	18–24	

== Television appearances ==
Williams has appeared numerous times in Welsh language television programmes on S4C. He was green gunged with swimmer David Davies in the Crawfr children's television programme and in 2011 has appeared in Clwb Rygbi Shane.

In 2012, Williams made a cameo appearance as himself in an episode of the UK TV comedy drama Stella.

In February 2012, Williams joined the team of BBC Wales pundits, covering the Six Nations. In 2012 he had a TV appearance on BBC2 showing his careers beginning with his gymnastics in Amman Valley School where he was played by 15-year-old Jonathan Coleman.

As part of a job-swap documentary for Irish television broadcast on 1 March 2017, Williams trained for and played Gaelic football for Glenswilly; in return, Michael Murphy was sent to train with French rugby club Clermont Auvergne. Williams scored four points (three from play) on his debut for the club in January, playing as full forward. He continued to maintain the links he had established with the club.

BBC One Wales aired a documentary in 2017 called Shane – For the love of the game. This documentary followed Williams as he went to work with his family firm, tried new sports and attempted to build a life without rugby.
