= Richard Summers =

Wales international rugby union footballer

- Born: Richard Henry Bowlas Summers; 30 July 1860 Haverfordwest, Wales
- Died: 22 December 1941 (aged 81) Haverfordwest, Wales
- School: Cowbridge Grammar School; Cheltenham College

Rugby union career
- Position: Forward
Amateur team(s)
Years	Team	Apps	(Points)
- Haverfordwest RFC
International career
Years	Team	Apps	(Points)
1881	Wales	1	(0)

Richard Henry Bowlas Summers (30 July 1860 – 22 December 1941) was a Welsh rugby union fullback who played club rugby for Haverfordwest and international rugby for Wales. Summers was a member of the first Wales international team, that faced England in 1881.

== Rugby career ==
Summers first played rugby for Cowbridge Grammar School as a schoolboy, but in May 1879 he left Cowbridge for a place at Cheltenham College, which he also represented. In July 1880 he left Cheltenham and returned to his home town of Haverfordwest where he turned out for local club Haverfordwest RFC. When Richard Mullock began looking for players to represent the first Wales international rugby team, Summers fitted the profile of an educated gentleman from a club representing one of the outer reaches of the Welsh rugby map. It is believed that Summers came to the attention of Mullock as both Cowbridge Grammar and Cheltenham College were on the same fixture list as Cardiff, whose players Mullock was in contact with.

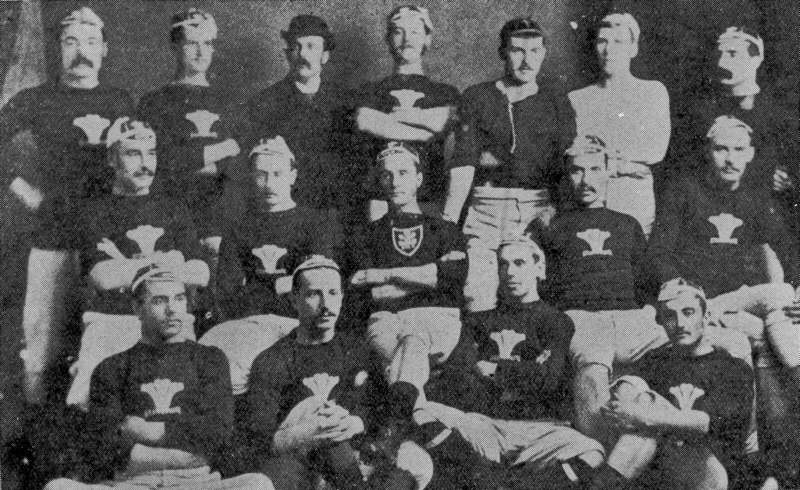
The first Welsh team, Summers is sat in the front row, furthest right, February 1881

Summers was played at fullback along with Newport's Charlie Newman, while the team was captained by Australian James Bevan. The international game was a disaster for Wales; the team had never played together before, and many were out of position; but even with these problems the match was far too easy a victory for the English. After losing by eight goals and six tries to nil the national press was angry at what was seen as a humiliation to the country. Summers was never chosen to represent his country again, and not long afterwards he emigrated to India.

Although Summers gave Haverfordwest their first international player in Wales' first game, it took the club almost one hundred years to produce another Welsh cap, when Peter Morgan was selected in 1980.

=== International matches played ===
Wales (rugby union)

- England 1881

== Bibliography ==
- Godwin, Terry (1984). The International Rugby Championship 1883-1983. Grafton Street, London: Willow Books. ISBN 0-00-218060-X.
- Smith, David; Williams, Gareth (1980). Fields of Praise: The Official History of The Welsh Rugby Union. Cardiff: University of Wales Press. ISBN 0-7083-0766-3.
