= Trefor Evans (rugby union) =

British Lions & Wales international rugby union footballer

- Born: Trefor Pryce Evans; 26 November 1947 (age 78) Chorley, Lancashire, England
- Height: 6 ft 2 in (188 cm)
- School: Ammanford Grammar School
- Occupation: Estate agent

Rugby union career
- Position: Flanker
Amateur team(s)
Years	Team	Apps	(Points)
- Amman United RFC
–	Swansea RFC		
–	Barbarian F.C.		
International career
Years	Team	Apps	(Points)
1975-1977	Wales	10	(8)
1977	British Lions	1	(0)

Trefor Pryce Evans (born 26 November 1947, in Chorley) is a former Wales international rugby union player. He played as a flanker.

Evans played club rugby for Pantyffynon Youth RFC Amman United RFC and Swansea RFC.

He had 10 caps for Wales, from 1975 to 1977, scoring 2 tries, 8 points on aggregate. He played three times at the Five Nations Championship, in 1975, 1976 and 1977, scoring then all the points of his international career.

In 1977 he toured New Zealand with the British Lions, playing the first test. He then captained the mid week team.
