= Nathan Rocyn-Jones =

Wales international rugby union footballer

- Born: David Nathan Rocyn-Jones; 17 July 1902 Abertillery, Wales
- Died: 26 January 1984 (aged 81) Ribchester, England
- University: Cambridge University
- Notable relative(s): Sir David Rocyn-Jones, father

Rugby union career
- Position: Fullback
Amateur team(s)
Years	Team	Apps	(Points)
- Newport RFC
–	Cambridge University		
–	St. Mary's Hospital		
International career
Years	Team	Apps	(Points)
1925	Wales	1	(0)

Nathan Rocyn-Jones FRCS (17 July 1902 – 26 January 1984) was a Welsh international rugby union full back who played club rugby for Newport Rugby Football Club and represented Cambridge. He won a single cap for Wales and after retiring from playing rugby became President of the Welsh Rugby Union.

== Rugby career ==
Rocyn-Jones came from a long-line of medical practitioners and his father, Sir David Rocyn-Jones was Medical Officer for Health for Monmouthshire. While studying medicine at Cambridge, Rocyn-Jones represented the University, but it was while at St Mary's Hospital, London, would gain his one and only cap for Wales, when he was selected to face Ireland as part of the 1925 Five Nations Championship. The game took place at Ravenhill, Belfast, and Wales were led by Llanelli's Idris Jones. Wales were outclassed and lost 19-3.

Although Rocyn-Jones did not play for Wales again, he served the club later in his career, when, like his father before him, he was made President of the Welsh Rugby Union. His presidency lasted a year, but his time coincided with the 1964-65 Triple Crown winning team. During his presidency, Rocyn-Jones clashed with the Welsh selectors, which included past Welsh players like Cliff Jones, Harry Bowcott and Rees Stephens, over the nature of the Welsh play. Rocyn-Jones believed that the game was "essentially played for enjoyment and that too much emphasis could be placed on technical and tactical skill" .

=== International matches played ===
Wales

- Ireland 1925

== Bibliography ==
- Smith, David; Williams, Gareth (1980). Fields of Praise: The Official History of The Welsh Rugby Union. Cardiff: University of Wales Press. ISBN 0-7083-0766-3.
