= Logo of the Welsh Rugby Union =

Emblem used by the Welsh Rugby Union

Current logo used by the Welsh Rugby Union.

The Welsh Rugby Union logo is the emblem used by the Welsh Rugby Union (WRU) and has become associated with Wales. The emblem is based on the Prince of Wales's feathers, a heraldic badge associated with the Prince of Wales since the early 17th century by British holders of the title, however the badge's English origin has prompted calls by some Welsh people for the WRU to change their logo for a design more historically linked to Wales. The use of the feathers by the WRU date back to its founding, with a stylistic modification of the logo taking place in the 1990s.

== Description ==
Prince of Wales's feathers

The current emblem used by the Welsh Rugby Union (WRU) is based on the Prince of Wales's feathers which features a gold coronet with three white (or silver) ostrich feathers behind it.

The emblem is used to represent the Prince of Wales, although as the emblem is applied prior to the official investiture of the title Prince of Wales, it is "technically the [heraldic] badge of the Duke of Cornwall, or Heir Apparent". The emblem has its origins with English royal Edward the Black Prince in the 14th century, who inherited the standard and the emblem's motto from Queen Phillipa, his mother. The emblem has been associated with the Prince of Wales since the early 17th century, although associated with English holders of the title, as it was not associated with Princes of Wales that were native-born to Wales, the last being Owain Glyndŵr who died around 1415. The design of the three feathers are said to be based on the French Fleur de Lys.

In the 1990s, the badge used by the WRU was modified to become more stylised, replacing Ich dien (German for 'I serve'), present on the heraldic badge, with "WRU" on the sporting body's emblem. This was done to allow the WRU to copyright the logo.

== Use ==
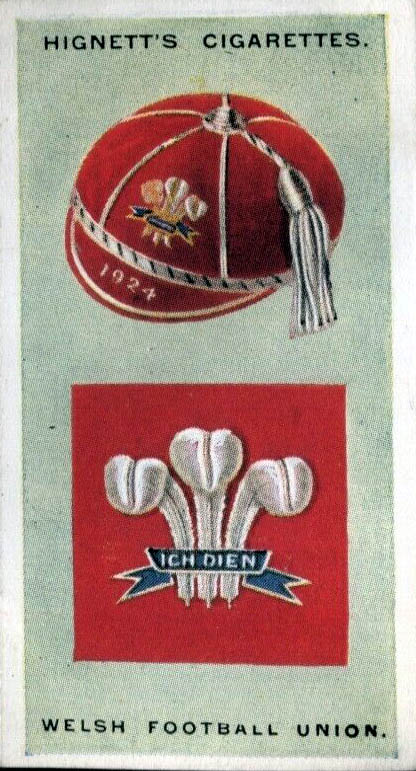
Cigarette card from 1924, containing the emblem as used by the Welsh Football Union (the WRU's former name).

The three feathers design has since become widespread in Wales, present on various Welsh products, represented the Welch Regiment in the British Army, and as the symbol of the Welsh Rugby Union. Its later "widespread use" once caused then Prince of Wales, Charles to launch a "clampdown". With letters sent from Buckingham Palace in 2007 to several Welsh companies for them to stop selling items with the emblem, as the emblem is the "personal property of the Prince of Wales". Companies that are granted a Royal Warrant are those only entitled to display the three feathers on their products. The symbol has become a "badge of pride" in Wales by some, alongside other national symbols of Wales such as the Welsh dragon, leek and daffodil.

The emblem baring the three feathers has been used by the WRU since 1881, being present during Wales' first international against England. However in 1899, a leek was used to represent Welsh rugby rather than the current three feathers. On the crest for the Anglo-Australia team as part of the 1899 British Lions tour to Australia, four symbols represented the Home Nations of the United Kingdom, with two crossed leeks used to represent Wales.

However, the current three feathers symbol later became the main emblem used in Welsh rugby, with a World Rugby Museum volunteer stating "It is thought that the WRU picked the Prince of Wales Feathers over the leek as their symbol in the nineteenth century as a demonstration of loyalty to Britain and her empire" and that the Welsh were "not very" close to having leeks become the symbol of the Welsh Rugby Union. The badge of the British & Irish Lions currently contains the three feathers to represent Wales among the other three home nations.

== Controversy of the logo ==
In Wales, the use of the three feathers is seen by some as oppressive as it serves as reminder for them of English rule in Wales, or as subjugating and shameful, sometimes emphasised when the rugby team are not performing well. These connotations have prompted some calls for the WRU to change their emblem. With various petitions set up advocating for the change of the crest to another design, such as a dragon in place of the three feathers. The emblem has been described as "inappropriate" for Welsh nationalists and republicans in its usage to represent "a team that is itself an icon of Wales", due to the badge's association with the Prince of Wales title and its use in the British Armed Forces.

When questioned by the Daily Post, some fans critical of the logo stated it is "an outdated symbol with three German feathers which represents England [...] nothing to do with Welsh heritage", and that the Wales national football team "represents the country so much better when it comes to language, heritage and culture". Supporters for retaining the current logo state "it is now internationally recognised [...] as being the WRU logo". The use of the three feathers by Wrexham A.F.C. was also questioned, with critics stating it "belongs in the past" and removing the feathers "would be a welcome addition", although a supporter for the feathers' use stated "it's surely evolved to symbolise something else now".

In 2025, the People for the Ethical Treatment of Animals (PETA), called for the three features to be dropped for a dragon. The group stated that it would raise awareness and remind people that the ostrich feathers that appear on the logo are only to be used on the birds themselves and not in the fashion industry.

=== Potential replacements ===
Welsh Dragon, a proposed alternative symbol

In November 2021, an e-petition for replacing the feathers with another Welsh symbol, such as a dragon, gained traction following the rugby team's defeat to New Zealand reaching above 4,000 signatures at the time.

Aside various mentions of a dragon to be used as a potential replacement. In October 2021, pro-independence group YesCymru presented mock-up alternatives to the WRU logo utilising different Welsh symbols, such as a leek, daffodil, and harp. The proposals received "mixed reviews" on social media.

== See also ==
- Prince of Wales#Contemporary debate – Debate in Wales on the continuation of the title
- List of rulers of Wales
- National symbols of Wales
