= Prince of Wales's feathers =

Heraldic badge of the Prince of Wales

- Armiger: William, Prince of Wales
- Shield: A plume of three ostrich feathers argent enfiled by a royal coronet of alternate crosses and fleur-de-lys or
- Motto: German: Ich dien (I serve)

The Prince of Wales's feathers are the heraldic badge of the Prince of Wales, the heir to the British throne. The badge consists of three white ostrich feathers encircled by a gold coronet. A ribbon below the coronet bears the German motto Ich dien (German: [ɪç ˈdiːn], modern German "ich diene", "I serve"). As well as being used in royal heraldry, the feathers are sometimes used to symbolise Wales itself, particularly in Welsh rugby union and Welsh regiments of the British Army.

== Bearers of the motif ==
Edward the Black Prince's "shield for peace": Sable, three ostrich feathers argent

The feathers are the badge of the heir apparent to the British throne regardless of whether or not the Prince of Wales title is held.

=== House of Plantagenet ===
The ostrich feathers heraldic motif is generally traced back to Edward the Black Prince (1330–1376), eldest son and heir apparent of King Edward III of England. The Black Prince bore (as an alternative to his paternal arms) a shield of Sable, three ostrich feathers argent, described as his "shield for peace", probably meaning the shield he used for jousting. These arms appear several times on his chest tomb in Canterbury Cathedral, alternating with his paternal arms (the royal arms of King Edward III differenced by a label of three points argent). The Black Prince also used heraldic badges of one or more ostrich feathers in various other contexts.

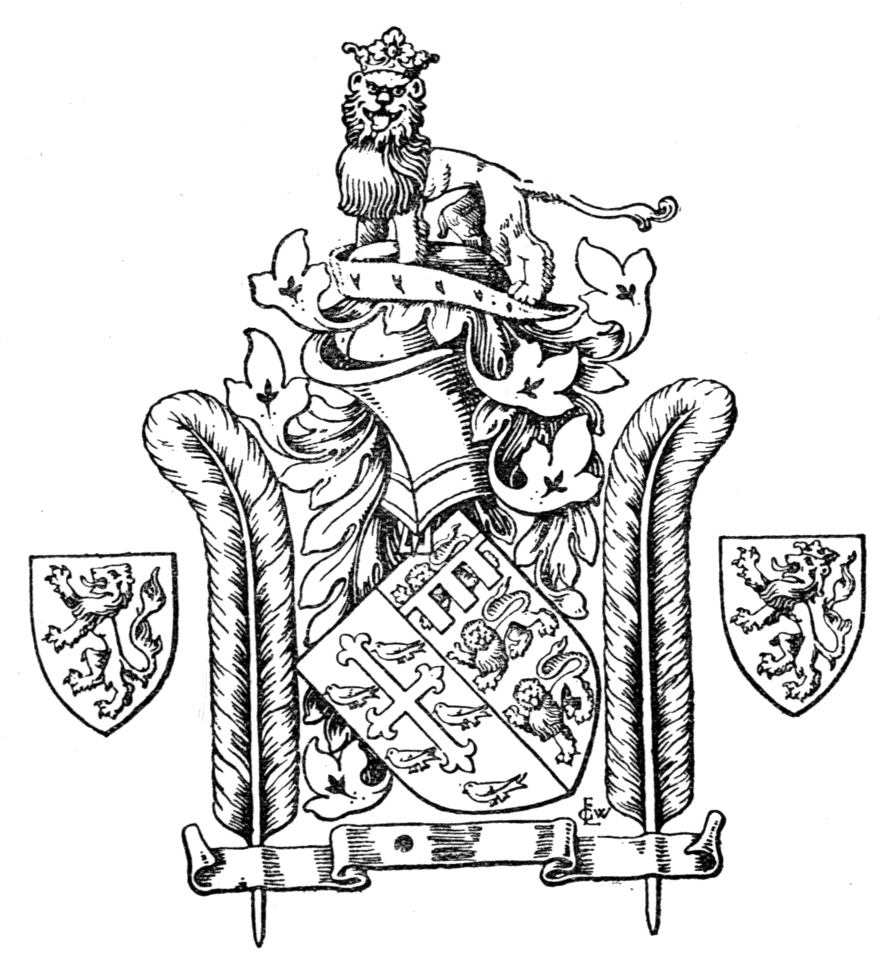
Ostrich feather supporters for Thomas de Mowbray, 1st Duke of Norfolk

The feathers had first appeared at the time of the marriage of Edward III to Philippa of Hainault, and Edward III himself occasionally used ostrich feather badges. It is therefore likely that the Black Prince inherited the badge from his mother, descended from the Counts of Hainault, whose eldest son bore the title "Count of Ostrevent", the ostrich (French: autruche, Old French spellings including ostruce) feathers being possibly an heraldic pun on that name. Alternatively, the badge may have derived from the Counts of Luxembourg, from whom Philippa was also descended, who had used the badge of an ostrich. The accompanying motto, "Ich dien" (meaning "I serve"), may also be attributed to Philippa and the language of her Low Countries homeland. Sir Roger de Clarendon, an illegitimate son of the Black Prince by his mistress Edith Willesford, bore arms of Or, on a bend sable three ostrich feathers argent.

King Richard II, the Black Prince's legitimate son, used ostrich feather badges in several colours and awarded augmented arms with ostrich feather supporters to Thomas de Mowbray, 1st Duke of Norfolk (1366–1399).

==== Legendary origins ====
According to a longstanding legend, the Black Prince obtained the badge from the blind King John of Bohemia, against whom he fought at the Battle of Crécy in 1346. After the battle, the prince is said to have gone to the body of the dead king, and taken his helmet with its ostrich feather crest, afterwards incorporating the feathers into his arms, and adopting King John's motto, "Ich dien", as his own. The story first appears in writing in 1376, the year of the Black Prince's death. There is, however, no sound historical basis for it, and no evidence for King John having used either the motto or the crest (he actually bore a crest of vultures' wings). Nevertheless, King John was also Count of Luxembourg, whose badge was an ostrich feather as has been noted above. Therefore, the claim on the Black Prince's tomb that he had adopted the badge to honour the dead king's courage might well be true after all.

Since a key factor in the English army's victory at Crécy was the use of longbow archers (a third of whom were Welsh) it is also sometimes said to have been Edward's pride in the men of Wales which led him to adopt a symbol alluding to their assistance. The Freemen of Llantrisant claim that it was their ancestors who killed King John of Bohemia and captured his ostrich-feather emblem. The medieval German motto "Ich dien" ("I serve") is a near-homophone for the Welsh phrase "Eich Dyn" meaning "Your Man", which might have helped endear the young Black Prince to the Welsh soldiers in particular, but there doesn't seem to be any contemporary evidence for this claim. In the 19th century, newspaper articles at various times attempted to reappropriate the motto to signify "Eich Dyn".

=== House of Lancaster ===
Henry IV's "Sovereygne" ostrich feather badge

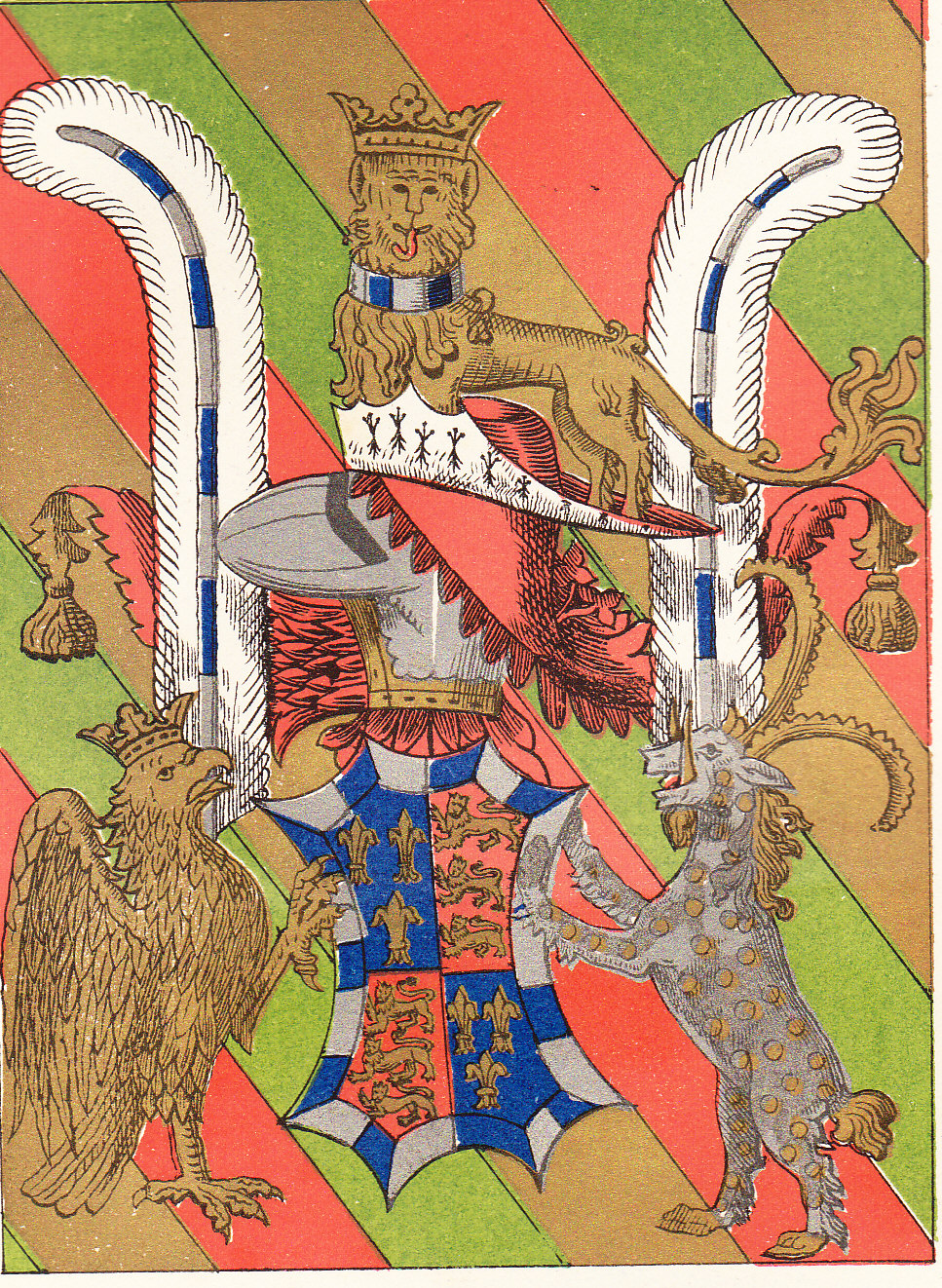
Achievement of John Beaufort, 1st Duke of Somerset. It is the earliest garter plate with supporters.

John of Gaunt, 1st Duke of Lancaster, the Black Prince's second younger brother, used ostrich feathers in several contexts, including on a shield very similar to the Black Prince's "shield for peace", although in Gaunt's case the feathers were ermine. Single ostrich feather supporters were also used by John Beaufort, 1st Duke of Somerset (1404–1444) (as shown in his Garter stall plate in St George's Chapel), the second son of John Beaufort, 1st Earl of Somerset (1371–1410), the eldest of the four legitimized children of John of Gaunt by his mistress Katherine Swynford.

King Henry IV, of the House of Lancaster, the son of John of Gaunt by his first wife Blanche of Lancaster, used a badge of a single ostrich feather entwined by a scroll inscribed with the motto "Ma Sovereyne". His eldest son and successor King Henry V used ostrich feathers as a secondary royal badge at various times, as did Henry IV's younger sons Thomas of Lancaster, 1st Duke of Clarence who used an ermine ostrich feather with a label; John of Lancaster, 1st Duke of Bedford who used an ostrich feather with the "Sovereygne" scroll; and Humphrey of Lancaster, 1st Duke of Gloucester who used an ostrich feather semée of fleurs-de-lis. Similar badges were used by other royal princes.

=== House of Tudor ===
The first Prince of Wales to use the badge in its modern form (i.e. three white feathers encircled by a coronet, and with the motto Ich dien) was Prince Arthur (1486–1502), eldest son of Henry VII, at the beginning of the 16th century. It was also widely used by Prince Edward, son of Henry VIII and afterwards Edward VI, although he was never formally invested as Prince of Wales. Feathers continued to be used as lesser royal badges, by Elizabeth I among others, until the end of the century.

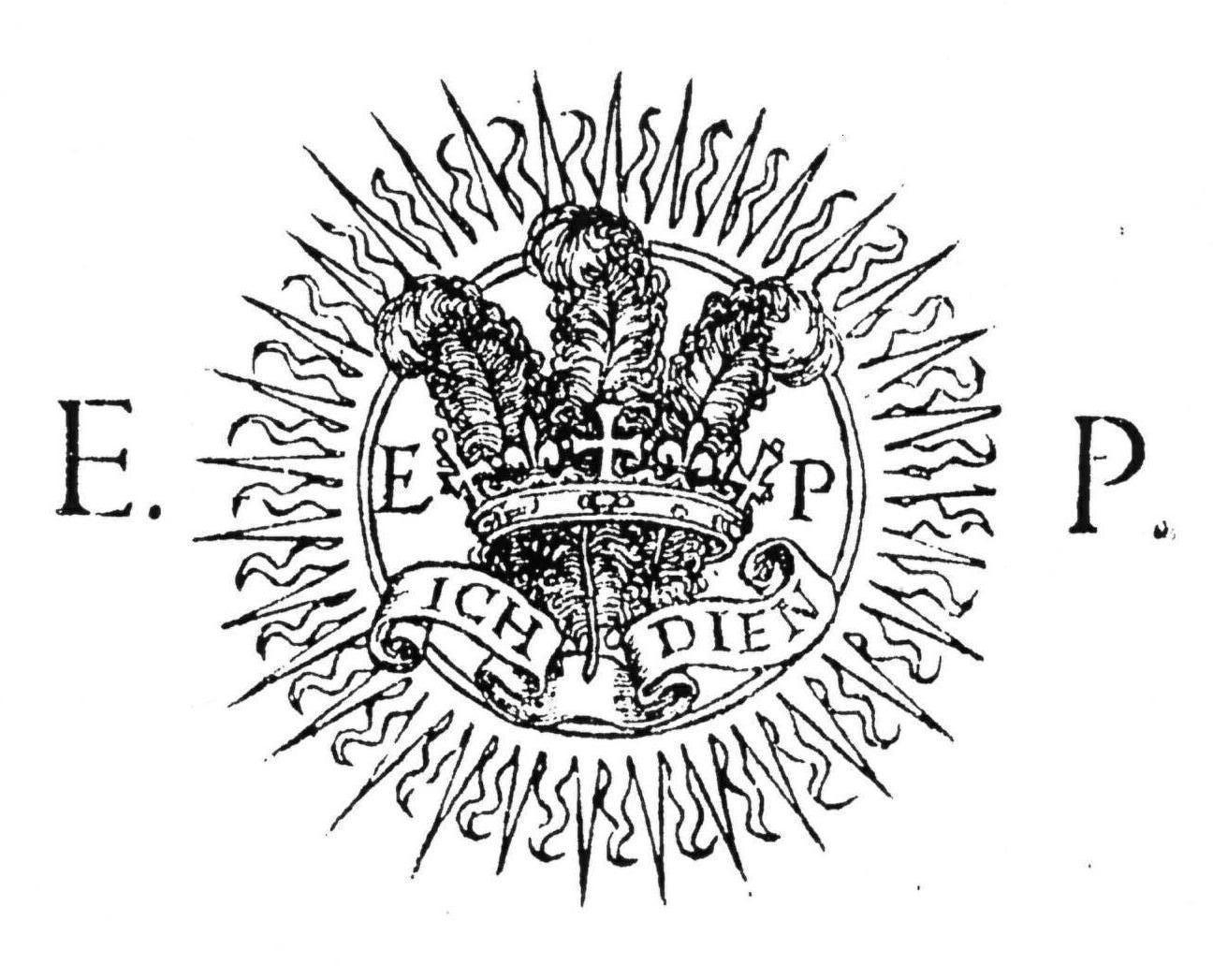
The badge of Prince Edward (later King Edward VI), as drawn in 1543, comprising A plume of three ostrich feathers enfiled by a royal coronet of alternate crosses and fleur-de-lys surrounded by the Sun of York, a badge of the House of York

=== House of Stuart and successors ===
Only from the beginning of the 17th century did the badge become exclusively associated with the Prince of Wales. It has formed the dexter badge of the heraldic achievement of the Prince of Wales since at least 1901, blazoned A plume of three ostrich feathers argent enfiled by a coronet composed of fleurs-de-lys and crosses patée or alternately with motto Ich Dien.

== Contemporary uses ==
=== Military ===
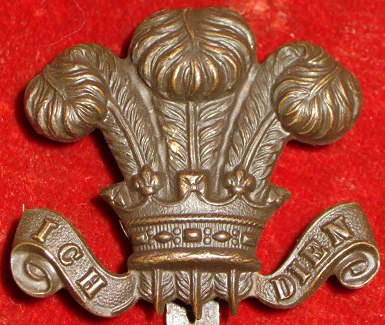
Cap badge for the Prince of Wales' Own Civil Service Rifles

Several British military units have incorporated the Prince of Wales's feather into their badges. The feathers are featured on the cap badge of the Royal Welsh, an amalgamation of three Welsh regiments, the Royal Welch Fusiliers, the Royal Regiment of Wales and the Territorial Army's Royal Welsh Regiment. The badge of the Royal Navy's HMS Prince of Wales also incorporates the Prince of Wales's feathers. Other British military units that incorporate the Prince of Wales's feathers into their badge(s) include:

- 2 Squadron Honourable Artillery Company (squadron badge)
- Cheshire Yeomanry
- Princess of Wales' Royal Regiment (Queen's and Royal Hampshires) (cap badge)
- Royal Marines Band Service Commando Training Centre Lympstone (cap badge)
- Royal Monmouthshire Royal Engineers (Militia) (cap badge)
- Royal Wiltshire Yeomanry (Prince of Wales's Own) (cap badge)
- Royal Scots Dragoon Guards (Carabiniers and Greys) (arm badge)

The badge also appears as an element on the regimental badges of several military units in other countries of the Commonwealth of Nations, which have a historical connection with the Prince of Wales. These include:

- 4th/19th Prince of Wales's Light Horse of the Australian Army
- Princess of Wales' Own Regiment of the Canadian Army
- Royal Regiment of Canada of the Canadian Army
- Sri Lanka Light Infantry of the Sri Lanka Army

The Rashtriya Indian Military College, an Indian military academy formerly named the Prince of Wales Royal Indian Military College from 1922 to 1947, also utilizes the feather badge in its own symbology.

==== Lord-lieutenant ====
The cap and uniform badge of lord-lieutenants in Welsh lieutenancies uses the Prince-of-Wales feathers to differentiate its lord-lieutenants from lord-lieutenants in other counties.

==== Former ====
Insignia of 4th Prince of Wales' Own (PWO) Gurkha Rifles

Several former British Army units also incorporated the Prince of Wales's feathers into their own badges before their disbandment/amalgamation into larger units during the 20th and early 21st century. They include the 2nd King Edward VII's Own Gurkha Rifles (The Sirmoor Rifles), Prince of Wales's Leinster Regiment (Royal Canadians), Staffordshire Regiment (The Prince of Wales'), South Lancashire Regiment (The Prince of Wales's Volunteers), the 9th/12th Royal Lancers (Prince of Wales's), the Prince of Wales' Own Civil Service Rifles, and the Royal Hussars (Prince of Wales' Own). The 92nd (Prince of Wales's Own) Punjabis, a former British Indian Army unit, also incorporated the feather badge into its own design.

A single Prince of Wales's feather was also incorporated into the badge of HMS Norfolk. Norfolk was decommissioned in 2005.

=== Coinage ===
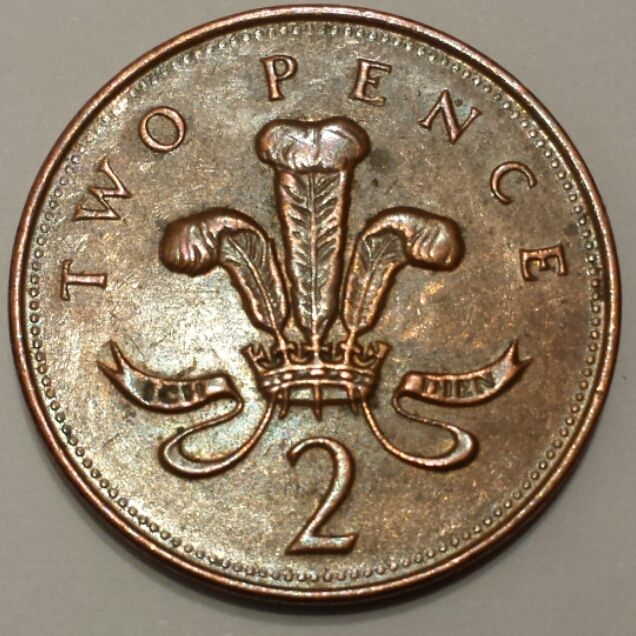
The feathers on a British two pence coin

During the English Civil War, most coins minted by Charles I at his various provincial wartime mints carry the feathers. The feathers appear on these coins because Charles I had no access to the Royal Mint in London and instead transferred the Aberystwyth Mint (originally established to coin Welsh silver) to Shrewsbury and then Oxford as an emergency measure. All the Civil War provincial mints are therefore in effect sub-branches of the Aberystwyth mint.

The badge appeared on the reverse of the British two pence coins minted between 1971 and 2008, many of which remain in circulation. The badge appears as a provenance mark on those silver coins minted using Welsh-mined silver in the seventeenth and eighteenth centuries.

=== Sports ===
Surrey County Cricket Club were granted permission in 1915 to use the feathers for their badge. Their home ground, The Oval, is on land owned by the Duchy of Cornwall.

The feathers appear on the badge of Wrexham Association Football Club.

The emblem of Lingfield Park Racecourse, in Surrey incorporates the feathers, having been opened in 1890 by the Prince of Wales (latterly Edward VII)

The feathers are used as the logo of two shooting clubs at Oxford University: the Oxford University Pistol Club (OUPC), and the Oxford University Rifle Club (OURC).

==== Welsh Rugby ====
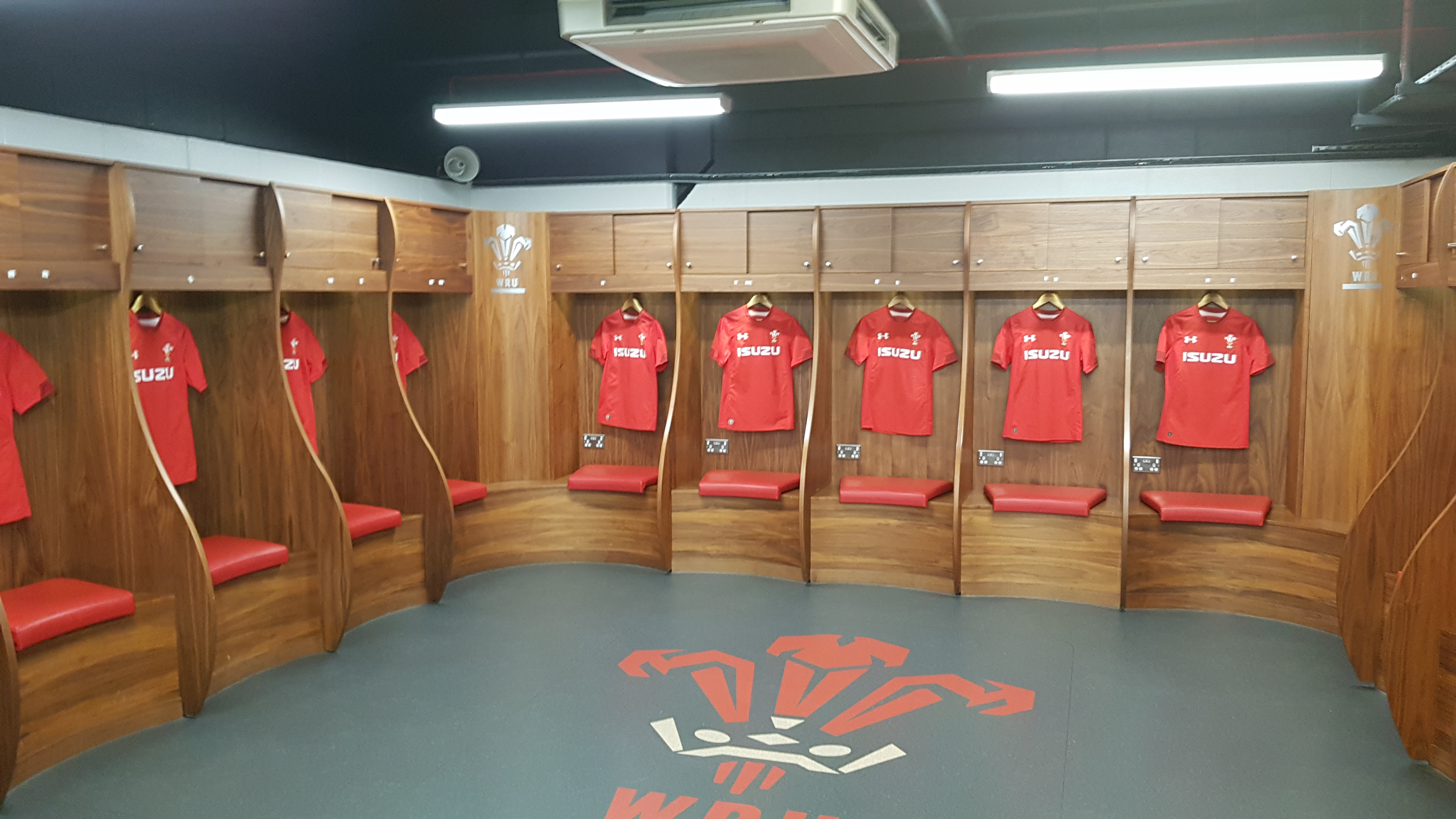
The home dressing room for the Welsh rugby union team, with a modern stylised version of the badge printed on its floor

The feathers have traditionally been worn on the jerseys of players in the Welsh rugby union team, being sewn on jerseys of players representing Welsh clubs before a national team or union existed. It has since been adopted as the logo of the Welsh Rugby Union by the Welsh Rugby Union (WRU). In the 1990s, the WRU modified the form of the badge they used to copyright the design. The new logo is more stylised, with the letters "WRU" in place of "Ich dien". As the logo of the WRU, the Prince of Wales' feathers are also represented in one of the quarters of the British and Irish Lions' badge.

There have been multiple calls for the WRU to use a logo "more relevant to Wales" as the feathers are seen by some as a British rather than a Welsh symbol, heavily associated with the British monarchy. In 2021, the pro-independence group YesCymru created a number of mock-up logos using the alternative Welsh symbols of a leek, daffodil and a harp. Using a Welsh dragon has also been proposed.

Wales Rugby League (WRL) also used the three feathers for its own logo between 1908 and 2005. After a period of changes and consultations, WRL officially changed the logo from the three feathers to a new Welsh Dragon design in 2022. The WRL chairman Brian Juliff stated that "This is another step forward into establishing our own brand identity across Wales. The dragon and the feathers have been a regular debate topic throughout my ten years as chair at Wales Rugby League and, after taking all opinions and considerations, we have finally decided to go with the majority view and instincts."

=== Other uses ===
Royal standard for the Prince of Wales in Canada. The feathered badge is placed in its centre.

The Prince of Wales's feather is incorporated into the Canadian royal standard for the Prince of Wales. The feathered badge is imposed on a blue roundel within a wreath of golen maple leaves.

The Prince of Wales's feathers has been incorporated into the coat of arms of several regions and municipalities. Norfolk County Council was given special consent by King Edward VII to use the badge on its arms, in recognition of Sandringham House, which was one of the King's favourite residences. From 1932 until its abolition in 1965, the Municipal Borough of Barnes, Surrey, used feathers based on those of the Prince of Wales on its coat of arms, in honour of the fact that the then Prince of Wales (afterwards Edward VIII, and later Duke of Windsor) had been born in the borough. The badge was also used on the coat of arms of Penang until 1985, a state of Malaysia that the British settled in 1786 as Prince of Wales Island.

Coat of arms for Norfolk County Council, which incorporates the feathered badge in its design

A derivative of the badge is that used by the Prince's Trust, a charitable organisation founded by Charles III (then Prince of Wales). The Carlton Club is another organisation in the UK that also uses the feathered coronet badge as its emblem, without the motto. The badge is used by a society in Malta called "The Prince of Wales Philharmonic Society". The scope of this organisation is mainly one related to music but is also linked to the feast of St. Dominic in Vittoriosa in Malta. Malta was a colony of the British Crown for 200 years, and there exist a variety of clubs and organisations bearing the name of royal personalities.

Several schools named after the Prince of Wales incorporate his badge in their own symbols. They include Prince Edward School in Harare, Zimbabwe; the Prince of Wales' College in Moratuwa, Sri Lanka, and the Prince of Wales Secondary School in Vancouver, Canada. The badge is inscribed on the foundation stone of Patna Medical College and Hospital, in Patna, India, a medical college initially established as the Prince of Wales Medical College.

Many pubs in the UK are named The Prince of Wales's Feathers, The Prince's Feathers or simply The Feathers, particularly in areas associated with royal estates.

A diamond broach of the Prince of Wales's feathers was commissioned by Edward VIII when Prince of Wales and given by him to Wallis Simpson in 1935. It was sold at the auction of Wallis's jewellery at Sotheby's in Geneva 1987 and was bought by the actor Elizabeth Taylor bidding over the telephone for $623,000. It was sold at Christie's in 2011 as part of the sale of Taylor's jewellery collection for $1.3 million.

== See also ==
- Coat of arms of the Prince of Wales
- Dieu et mon droit
- Flag of Wales
- Honi soit qui mal y pense
- Royal badges of England
- White feather

== Bibliography ==
- Pinches, J. H.; Pinches, R. V. (1974). The Royal Heraldry of England. London: Heraldry Today. ISBN 090045525X.
- Scott-Giles, C. Wilfrid (1929). The Romance of Heraldry. London: J.M. Dent.
- Siddons, Michael Powell (2009). Heraldic Badges in England and Wales. Vol. 2. Woodbridge: Society of Antiquaries/Boydell. pp. 178–90. ISBN 9781843834939.
