= Alun Thomas =

British Lions & Wales international rugby union footballer

- Born: Alun Gruffydd Thomas; 3 February 1926 Cwmavon, Neath Port Talbot, Wales
- Died: 8 May 1991 (aged 65) Swansea, Wales
- School: Port Talbot County School
- University: University College, Aberystwyth

Rugby union career
- Position: Centre
Amateur team(s)
Years	Team	Apps	(Points)
- Llanelli Wanderers RFC
- Llangennech RFC
- Swansea RFC
1950-1954	Cardiff RFC		
1954	Llanelli RFC		
- Barbarian F.C.
International career
Years	Team	Apps	(Points)
1952–1955	Wales	13	(6)
1955	British Lions	0	(0)

Alun Gruffydd Thomas (3 February 1926 – 8 May 1991) was a rugby union centre from Cwmavon who played international rugby for Wales between 1952 and 1955. He studied at UCW Aberystwyth and played for the college first team and the newly founded Rugby Club.

At club level he represented Cardiff, Swansea and Llanelli, and was also selected for invitational tourists The Barbarians. In 1955 he toured with the British Lions in South Africa, playing in five games. He then managed the team 19 years later on the 1974 tour of South Africa. He won his first cap as a centre against England in Twickenham.
