= David Rocyn-Jones =

Welsh medical officer

The Reverend Sir David Thomas Rocyn-Jones, CBE, K St J, DL, JP (16 November 1862 – 30 April 1953) was a Welsh medical officer of health and servant of multiple professional bodies within Wales.

== Professional career ==
Rocyn-Jones was born in Rhymney to a notable bonesetter, Thomas Rocyn Jones and Mary Rees, who was a descendant of the preacher Rhys Davies. He was educated at Lewis School, Pengam, and later at University College, Cardiff. Rocyn-Jones gained his MB in 1897 from the University of Edinburgh and then returned to Wales to become a general practitioner in Abertillery where he also held the post of chief surgeon at the Powell Collieries and Honorary Surgeon to Abertillery RFC. After passing his DPH qualification in Oxford, he was appointed the first Medical Officer for Health for Monmouthshire in 1908, responsible for ill-health prevention strategies within the county, with a yearly salary of £600. Retiring from this post in 1946, he was succeeded by his son, Gwyn. He was one of the founders of the King Edward VII Welsh National Memorial Association, an organisation set up in 1911 to prevent and treat tuberculosis.

Rocyn-Jones continued his relationship with University College, Cardiff, becoming its vice-president, and would later become involved in the creation of the University of Wales College of Medicine. In 1920 he was appointed a CBE, and in 1948 was knighted.

== Association to professional bodies ==
Rocyn-Jones served on many professional bodies, including the British Medical Association and St. John Ambulance. Outside of medicine, he also had a deep love and knowledge of rugby football and in 1947 became President of the Welsh Rugby Union, taking over from Horace Lyne, holding the post until his death in 1953. In 1964, his son Nathan would follow his father in also becoming President of the WRU.

== Private life ==
Rocyn Jones married Alla Jones in 1901. They had four sons, two of whom, Gwyn and Nathan, continued the family tradition of entering the medical profession. Nathan would not only follow his grandfather's profession, of working with bones, by becoming an orthopaedic surgeon, but would also continue the family links to rugby by representing Wales in 1925.

In terms of religious faith Rocyn-Jones was a staunch Congregationalist, into which denomination he was ordained in addition to his medical training. He is remembered for his beliefs, but also for having a gentle sense of humour he sometimes brought to bear on his medical work, as was shown on one occasion in his Abertillery years when he was required to treat a young rugby supporter injured by a wayward ball. "Well, boy", he is recalled as saying;" you've had a knock without playing"!
