= Llanelli Wanderers RFC =

Rugby team in Carmarthenshire, Wales

(Wales) Llanelli Wanderers RFC
- Full name: Llanelli Wanderers Rugby Football Club
- Nickname: Wanderers
- Founded: 1946–47
- Location: Llanelli, Wales
- Ground: Stradey Park (Capacity: 5,000)
- President: Mr Salvo Giannini
- Coach: Sean Gale
- League: Welsh Premier Division
- 2024-25: Welsh Championship West, 1st (promoted)
Team kit

Official website
- llanelliwanderers.rfc.wales

Llanelli Wanderers Rugby Football Club is a rugby union team from the town of Llanelli, South Wales. They are members of the Welsh Rugby Union and a feeder club for the Llanelli Scarlets.

== History ==
In the 1946–47 a group of ex-servicemen set up a new Llanelli team the YMCA RFC. In 1951 the Llanelli Wanderers RFC were formed, with their headquarters at the Prince of Wales Inn. The club's motto, "Cyfeillach trwy Grwydro" (Friendship Through Wandering), has been practiced to the full with the club having had many different headquarters before moving to the present site in 2003. Similarly, the club has needed to use many corporation grounds, as well as sharing the facilities of their neighbours, Llanelli RFC.

The Wanderers won the Division 1 Cup Final on 7 April 2024 at the Millennium Stadium.

== Club badge ==
The Llanelli Wanderers badge is a cockle shell in the team colours holding the clubs initials. Underneath is the club motto "Cyfeillach trwy Grwydro" (Friendship Through Wandering). The motto, "Friendship through wandering," reflects Llanelli’s position as the first club to tour in Europe.

== Notable past players ==
- Aled Williams (Club Chairman)
- Steffan Hughes (Scarlets)
- Clive Rees (London Welsh, Wales and British Lions)
- Daniel Rodgers (Scarlets and Leeds)
