= Laugharne RFC =

Welsh rugby union club, based in Carmarthenshire, Wales

(Wales) Laugharne RFC
- Full name: Laugharne Rugby Football Club
- Nickname(s): Laugharnees, The Seasiders, The Cocklemen
- Founded: 1893
- Location: Laugharne, Wales
- Ground: Wooford Park (Capacity: 1000)
- President: Brian Jenkins
- Coach: Gary Price
- League: WRU Division Four West
- 2011-12: 9th
Team kit

Official website
- www.laugharnerfc.co.uk

Laugharne Rugby Football Club is a rugby union team from the village of Laugharne, West Wales. They presently play in the Welsh Rugby Union Division Four West League.

== History ==
The earliest recorded evidence of a rugby team in Laugharne comes from a team photo taken in 1893, though it could be argued that the game was played as early as a decade before, though no proof survives. The early years saw rugby in Laugharne being played on a non-affiliated basis, with most matches being friendlies, though in the 1930s the club entered a league in Pembrokeshire.

In the 1970/71 season Laugharne RFC finally joined the West Wales Rugby Union and started playing competitive games.

== Club badge ==
The team badge consists of a shield divided into quarters. Cockle shells, a castle, a Celtic cross and a coat of arms tell of Laugharne’s links with the sea, its seashore castle and the old feudal and township system.
