= Haverfordwest RFC =

Welsh rugby union club, based in Haverfordwest, Pembrokeshire

(Wales) Haverfordwest RFC
- Full name: Haverfordwest Rugby Football Club
- Nickname: Blues
- Founded: 1875; 151 years ago
- Location: Haverfordwest, Wales
- Ground(s): Pembroke Road, Merlins Bridge (Capacity: 1,000)
- President: Brian Stephens
- Coach: Craig Jones
- League: WRU Division Three West A
- 2017-18: 5th
Team kit

Official website
- www.hrfc.co.uk

Haverfordwest Rugby Football Club is a rugby union team from the town of Haverfordwest, West Wales. The club is a member of the Welsh Rugby Union and is a feeder club for the Llanelli Scarlets.

Former Wales prop Rob Evans rejoined the club in 2023 having retired from professional rugby.

== Club badge ==
The club badge depicts a phoenix rising from the ashes. This represents the teams reformation after the club was disbanded during World War I.

== Club honours ==
- WRU Division Three West, 2010-11 - Champions

== Notable former players ==
- (Wales) Peter Morgan (4 caps)
- (Wales) Richard Summers (1 cap)
- (Wales) Rob Evans (39 caps)
