= Lampeter Town RFC =

Welsh rugby union team

(Wales) Lampeter Town
- Full name: Lampeter Town Rugby Football Club
- Nickname: The Maroons
- Founded: 1875
- Location: Lampeter, Wales
- Region: Llanelli Scarlets
- Ground: North Road
- Coach(es): (Wales) Trystan Lloyd and Rhys Jones
- Captain: (Wales) Brynmor Jones
- League: WRU Division Two West
- 2024/25: 1st
Team kit

Official website
- www.lampetertownrfc.co.uk

Lampeter Town Rugby Football Club is a rugby union team from the town of Lampeter, West Wales. The club is a member of the Welsh Rugby Union and is a feeder club for the Llanelli Scarlets.

Lampeter is believed to be the first town in Wales to field a rugby union team when in 1850 the Reverend Professor Rowland Williams brought the game with him from Cambridge to St. David's College, Lampeter. Although no evidence exists of the origination of Lampeter RFC as a separate club team from Lampeter College there is written proof of a match in the Western Mail between the college team and a Lampeter club in 1879. In 1881 the Carmarthen Journal reported representatives from Lampeter were present at the formation of the Welsh Rugby Union.

Lampeter Town First Team were crowned champions of Division 3 West in 2024 earning promotion to Division 2 West. They were unlucky to be knocked out of the National cup in the Semi Finals by the eventual winners but redeemed themselves by beating St Clears in the Final of the West Wales Cup a few weeks later.

They finished the 2023-24 season in 3rd position and are pushing for promotion this season to Division 1.

Under new coaching Staff Trystan Lloyd and Rhys Jones the Firsts currently sit top of Division 2 and are unbeaten after 7 games.

== 2008/2009 season ==
Coach Huw Williams guided the club to the final of WRU Swalec Bowl which was played at the Millennium Stadium. The club narrowly lost the final to Morriston RFC.

== 2009/2010 season ==
The club experience a tough season following the previous years outing to Cardiff. They ended the season in 8th position after defeating Haverfordwest RFC on the last day of the season to ensure survival.

== 2010/2011 season ==
A number of changes took place during the summer. Jonathan Evans took over the head coach role with Huw Williams joining local side Aberaeron. The captaincy was also awarded to long-time player Huw Thomas, taking over from Gary Davies. A number of young players joined the senior squad along with one or two from outside the club.

== Lampeter Ladies ==
Lampeter is home to the second longest running Women's side in Wales. The Ladies originally played from 1988-1992 where they played teams all over the UK travelling to Manchester and London to play opposition on a regular basis. There was a 16 year gap from 1992 through to 2008 when the team was resurrected by Shirley Jones and Nerys James, since 2008 the Ladies have won the WRU Division 2 on two occasions and the WRU National Plate, playing the final at the Principality Stadium in 2022. In 2021/2022 the Ladies played a perfect season, when they went unbeaten in both the League and Cup Competition. The team is currently coached by Gareth Davies and Ryan Powell with Nerys James Davies the Team Manager of the side.

== Lampeter Saints ==
Lampeter Saints is the name of the club's senior 2nd XV. They play their rugby in West Wales Sport Division 1 West. They often compete against many local sides who also play their 1st XV rugby in Division Three West.

== Junior Section ==
The club have a junior section with players and teams ranging from Under 8's to Under 16's and Youth level. There are many of the current senior squad who have developed their rugby skills within the club's junior ranks.

== Notable former player ==
- (Wales) John Strand-Jones
