= Welsh Rugby Union =

Governing body of rugby union in Wales

Undeb Rygbi Cymru
- Sport: Rugby union
- Founded: 1881; 145 years ago
- World Rugby affiliation: 1886 (founder)
- Rugby Europe affiliation: 1999
- Patron: William, Prince of Wales
- Chairman: Lyndon Faulkner (from 22 November 2026)
- President: Terry Cobner
- Men's coach: Steve Tandy
- Women's coach: Sean Lynn
- Website: www.wru.wales

The Welsh Rugby Union (WRU; Welsh: Undeb Rygbi Cymru) is the governing body of rugby union in the country of Wales, recognised by the sport's international governing body, World Rugby.

The WRU is responsible for the running of rugby in Wales, overseeing 320 member clubs, the Welsh national team and National Leagues and Cups. The WRU is headed by the President (Terry Cobner), chairman (Lyndon Faulkner) and CEO (Abi Tierney).

== History ==
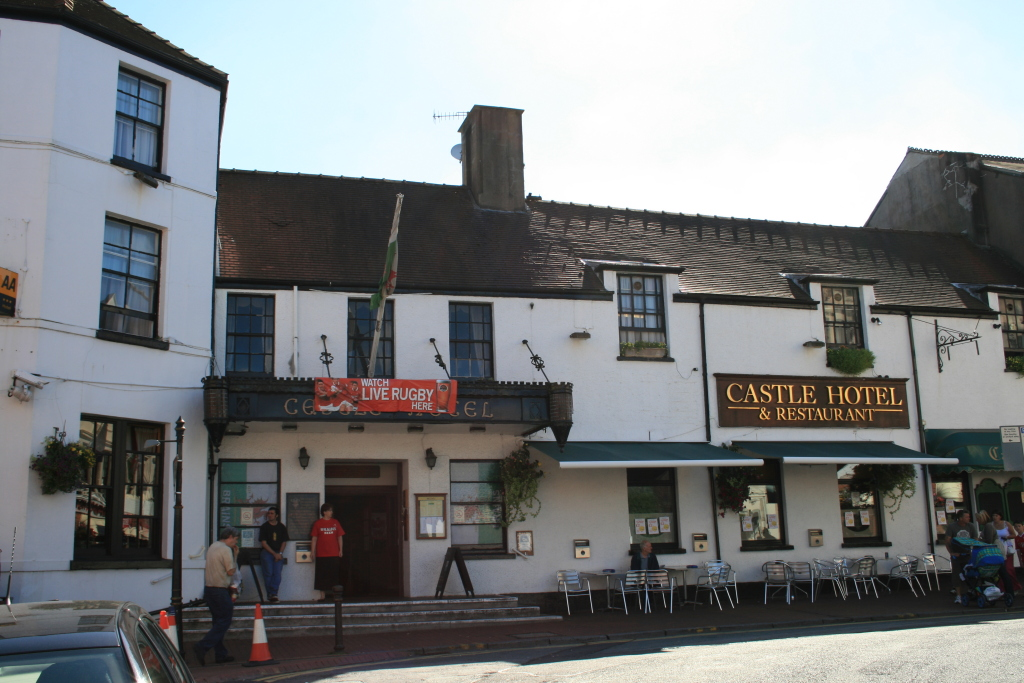
Castle Hotel, Neath, where the WRU was founded.

The roots of the Welsh Rugby Union lay in the creation of the South Wales Football Union (SWFU) in September 1875; formed, "...with the intention of playing matches with the principal clubs in the West of England and the neighbourhood. The rugby rules will be the code adopted. The South Wales Football Club was superseded in 1878 by the South Wales Football Union in an attempt to bring greater regulation to the sport and to select representatives from club sides to represent the international game. The SWFU though were poorly organised, and although they arranged fixtures between a South Wales team and various English clubs, they were often victims of fixture-clashes and were accused of lacking energy. In 1880, Richard Mullock, secretary of the Newport Athletic Club, decided to take matters into his own hands and without the backing of the SWFU organised an international match against England.

The match took place on 19 February 1881, and was won by England, with a score of seven goals, one dropped goal and six tries to nil. This heavy defeat planted the seeds for further reforms that would lead to the creation of the WRU.

Currently, there is confusion regarding the official date of creation of the Welsh Rugby Union. In March 1880 nine teams supposedly met at the Tenby Hotel, Swansea, with the intent of creating a new union. These teams are thought to have been, Cardiff RFC, Chepstow RFC, Haverfordwest RFC, Llandaff RFC, Llanelli RFC, Neath RFC, Newport RFC, Pontypridd RFC and Swansea RFC. The issue with accepting this meeting is that there is no written evidence, just oral repetition.

On 12 March 1881, eleven clubs met in the Castle Hotel, Neath to form what would be accepted as a Welsh rugby union. After Wales's defeat in their first international rugby match, the Neath meeting was organised by Mullock to form a union that could organise regular international matches. The founding clubs of the Welsh Football Union (WFU), as it was originally known, were Swansea C & FC, Pontypool RFC, Newport RFC, Merthyr RFC, Llanelli RFC, Bangor RFC, Brecon RFC, Cardiff RFC, Lampeter RFC, Llandovery RFC and Llandeilo RFC. Strangely the oldest rugby club in Wales, Neath RFC, is not recorded as being present, even though the meeting took place in the town, possibly because two of the main committee members of the SWFU, John Llewellyn and Sam Clark were Neath men, and the creation of the WFU disbanded their union.

The WRU was a founding member of the International Rugby Football Board, now known as World Rugby, in 1886 with Scotland and Ireland, with Mullock and Horace Lyne the Welsh representatives at the formal signing of the union in 1887.

It was not until 1934 that the current name, the Welsh Rugby Union, was adopted.

In 2015 Aileen Richards became the first woman to join the board of the union.

== Responsibilities ==
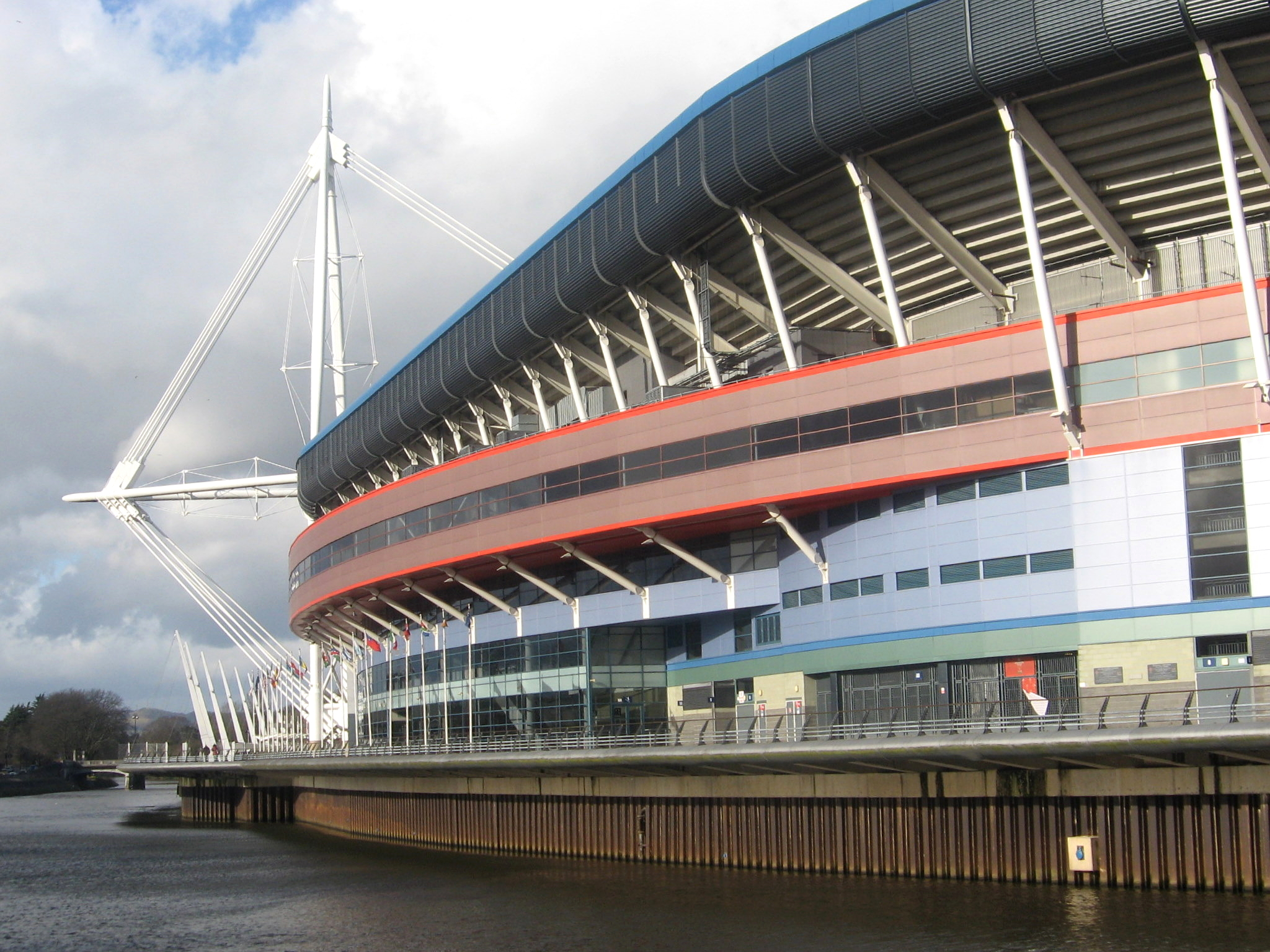
Exterior of the Millennium Stadium, Cardiff, where the Wales national team play all their home games

The WRU are responsible for the running of Welsh rugby, including 320 member clubs, the Welsh national team and National Leagues and Cups. The Welsh Rugby Union has a major role in the development of coaches, referees and players throughout all ages for both men and women. They also own the home of Welsh rugby union, the 74,500 capacity Millennium Stadium, Cardiff, "an icon of the modern Wales".

After the national team the next highest level of representation in Wales is the four regions based around top club sides, but representing a larger area. These regions came into being in 2003 when the WRU elected to reduce the current top tier of Welsh professional rugby union from nine clubs into five regions modelled on the successful Irish provinces and the Super Rugby franchises in South Africa, Australia and New Zealand. The WRU had hoped to reduce the teams to four regions but Cardiff and Llanelli successfully argued for stand-alone status. After one year the Celtic Warriors region was closed down and the four surviving regional clubs are Cardiff Rugby, The Scarlets, Ospreys and Dragons RFC. They play in the United Rugby Championship, European Professional Club Rugby (Champions Cup and Challenge Cup) and Anglo-Welsh Cup competitions. Each region may call up players from a set of club teams within their area. These top club sides play in the 14-strong Welsh Premier Division.

In August 2008 WRU chief Roger Lewis confirmed that the body was looking at a proposal to reinstate a fifth Welsh region, based in North Wales. Lewis admitted that he regretted the decision in 2004 to close down Celtic Warriors. In September 2008 a new North Wales Rugby development team was announced, likely to be based in Wrexham; ultimately, the team was launched as RGC 1404, and was to be based in Colwyn Bay instead of Wrexham. In the same month Llanelli Scarlets changed their name to simply Scarlets, believing the new name would better represent their region beyond Llanelli.

== Rugby Services Agreement ==
The current Rugby Services Agreement (or RSA) has been in place since 28 August 2014, and will be in place between the union and the four Welsh regions (Cardiff Rugby, Dragons RFC, Ospreys and The Scarlets) for six years. The RSA delivers £8.7million a year to the Regions guaranteed to be spent on Welsh qualified players with a complex matrix of funding, also guaranteeing a further £3.6million in loan facilities from the WRU repayable during the term of the RSA. Each Region also receives a one-off £500,000 payment on signature of the new RSA.

The new agreement also allows players to be offered a National Dual Contract (NDC), which means the union will pay 60% of a NDC player's salary and their region 40%. They also become available for all Welsh senior matches, despite if the match falls outside World Rugby's international release windows in June and November. The WRU retained the right to play up to 13 senior international games each year with a 13-day release facility for squad training before the Six Nations and Autumn series games. The new agreement does state that the national team head coach, currently Steve Tandy, will be the sole person to decide who gets a National Dual Contract, with a long-term aim of only selecting players based in Wales. The limit on foreign players in regional squads has been capped at a maximum of six while each region will be allowed two so-called time-serving players who will be available for Welsh selection after five years' residency (previously three years', which was effective before 31 December 2020).

== Principals ==
=== Presidents ===
- Cyril Chambers (1881(March)–1881(Sept.))
- Victor Albert George Child Villiers, 7th Earl of Jersey (1881(Sept)–1885)
- Sir J.T.D. Llewellyn (1885–1906)
- Horace Lyne MBE (1906–1947)
- Sir David Rocyn-Jones CBE (1947–1953)
- Ernest Davies (1953–1954)
- W.R. Thomas MBE (1954–1955)
- Major T.H. Vile MBE (1955–1956)
- Glyn Stephens (1956–1957)
- Enoch H. Rees (1957–1958)
- F.G. Phillips (1958–1959)
- Lt. Col. P.R. Howells (1959–1960)
- D. Hopkin Thomas (1960–1961)
- D.E. Davies (1961–1962)
- Wilf Faull MBE (1962–1963)
- D. Ewart Davies (1963–1964)
- Nathan Rocyn-Jones (1964–1965)
- David Jones (1965–1966)
- T.C. Prosser (1966–1967)
- Glyn Morgan (1967–1968)
- Ivor E. Jones CBE (1968–1969)
- V.C. Phelps (1969–1970)
- Kenneth Morgan Harris CBE (1970–1971)
- Rhys E. Williams (1971–1972)
- Vernon J. Parfitt (1972–1973)
- Leslie M. Spence MBE (1973–1974)
- Harry Bowcott (1974–1975)
- Handel C. Rogers (1975–1976)
- Hywel Thomas (1976–1977)
- T. Rowley Jones (1977–1978)
- D. Luther James (1978–1979)
- Gwyn Roblin (1979–1980)
- Cliff Jones OBE (1980–1981)
- Osmond John OBE (1981–1982)
- Hermas Evans (1982–1983)
- Eirwyn Davies (1983–1984)
- Kenneth Gwilym (1984–1985)
- Alun Thomas (1985–1986)
- Desmond Barnett (1986–1987)
- W. George Morgan (1987–1988)
- Myrddin Jones (1988–1989)
- Clive Rowlands (1989–1990)
- G.J. Treharne (1990–1991)
- Ieuan Evans (1991–1992)
- Graham Tregidon (1992–1993)
- Sir Tasker Watkins (1993–2004)
- Keith Rowlands (2004–2006(Nov.))
- Glanmor Griffiths (2007(May)- 2007 Oct)
- Dennis Gethin (2007–2019)
- Gerald Davies (2019–2023)
- Terry Cobner (2023–present)

=== Secretaries ===
- Richard Mullock (1881–1892)
- W.H. Gwynn (1892–1896)
- Walter E. Rees (1896–1948)
- Eric Evans (1948–1955)
- William H. Clement OBE (1956–1981)
- Ray Williams OBE (1981–1988)
- David East (1989)
- Denis Evans (1990–1993)
- Edward Jones (1993–1996)
- Richard Jasinski (1996–1997)
- Dennis Gethin (1998–2002)

Position no longer exists

=== Honorary Treasurers ===
- Richard Mullock (1881–1891)
- William H. Wilkins (1891–1903)
- T.R. Griffiths (1903–1930)
- Sam West (1930–1934)
- Eric Roberts (1934–1945)
- P.O. Evans (1946–1952)
- Kenneth Morgan Harris (1952–1982)
- Glanmor Griffiths (1984–2003)
- Studid Lee (Beaufort RFC)
- 2003 Position terminated.

== Criticisms ==
In 2008 the Welsh Language Society wrote to the WRU outlining a "lack of commitment to the Welsh language" and later held meetings to discuss the matter. In a statement to BBC Wales, a WRU spokesman said that it was reviewing its website and would be having more Welsh on the site.

The current logo of the Welsh Rugby Union is based on the Prince of Wales's feathers. There have been multiple calls for the WRU to use a logo "more relevant to Wales" as the feathers are associated by some with the "English crown". Pro-independence group YesCymru created mock-up WRU logos using a leek, daffodil and harp instead of the three feathers. Using a Welsh dragon has also been proposed.

The union's patron is Prince William, the current Prince of Wales. The naming of the Prince William Cup caused controversy in Wales in 2007, with petitions receiving more than 1,000 signatures calling for it to be named after the late Ray Gravell instead.

=== Toxic culture allegations ===
In January 2023, a BBC Wales investigation included multiple former WRU employees who made allegations of a "toxic culture" in the workplace of the WRU. Later that week, Steve Phillips resigned as the chief executive officer of the WRU and was replaced by Nigel Walker. WRU chair Ieuan Evans said that an external taskforce would be established to deal with the allegations.

As of November 2023, a 133-page review was completed highlighting "bullying and misogyny" in the WRU. A three-person chair of Dame Anne Rafferty, Quentin Smith and Maggie Alphonsi was appointed for an investigation. The review involved conducting 50 interviews with groups or individuals, and it assembled a 5,000-page document of evidence, the findings were the WRU was suffering a general "failure of governance". However, the organised approach of the report has been noted as being too political for rugby union. After the publication of the findings of the report, the WRU was forced to change the personnel on an executive level in the WRU, involving the appointment of a first female Chief Executive, Abi Tierney, and Richard Collier-Keywood as the new WRU chair.

=== UK neurological injuries lawsuit ===
In December 2023 a group of 295 former rugby players sued World Rugby, the Rugby Football Union and the Welsh Rugby Union for allegedly failing to put in place reasonable measures to protect the health and safety of players. This alleged failure is said to have caused disorders such as motor neurone disease, early onset dementia, chronic traumatic encephalopathy, epilepsy and Parkinson's disease.

== See also ==
- Wales national rugby union team
- Rugby union in Wales
- History of rugby union
- United Rugby Championship
- Welsh Premier Division
- WRU Challenge Cup
- WRU National Leagues
- Welsh Rugby Players Association

== Bibliography ==
- Smith, Dai (1980). Fields of Praise: The Official History of The Welsh Rugby Union. Cardiff: University of Wales Press. ISBN 0-7083-0766-3.
