= List of rugby union competitions =

The following is a list of notable rugby union competitions that are still in existence. This includes both international tournaments played by national Test teams and also domestic club and provincial competitions.

== International tournaments ==
Name	Participants	First played	Last played	Frequency	Notes
Men's Rugby World Cup	Top 12 teams from previous World Cup (the top 3 in each group) plus 12 nations from regional qualifying tournaments.	1987	2023	Quadrennial	
Women's Rugby World Cup	16 top national women's teams	1991	2025	Quadrennial	
Men’s Six Nations Championship	England, France, Ireland, Italy, Scotland, Wales	1883	2025	Annually	Originally the Home Nations Championship, then the Five Nations with France's entry into the competition in 1910. Became the Six Nations when Italy was added in 2000.
Women's Six Nations Championship	England, France, Ireland, Italy, Scotland, Wales	1996	2025	Annually	Originally the Home International Championship. Became the Five Nations in 1999 when France joined. Spain was added in 2000, but Ireland did not play all the other countries in 2000 or 2001, making the first true Women's Six Nations the 2002 competition. Spain were replaced by Italy effective in 2007 after the competition was taken over by the (men's) Six Nations committee.
The Rugby Championship	Argentina (since 2012), Australia, New Zealand, South Africa	1996	2025	Annually	From its inception through 2011, the competition involved only Australia, New Zealand and South Africa, and was known as the Tri Nations.
Rugby Europe Women's Championship	Up to 16 European national teams	1988	2025	Annually	Tournament for European women's national teams. Number of participants varies from year to year. The tournament is often divided into two "pools", dependent on playing strength. France and England, when they take part, normally enter "A" teams.
Rugby Europe International Championships	36 European national teams	2000	2025	Annually	Excludes European sides in the Six Nations Tournament. Currently played over a single season on a single round-robin basis with the competition split into five divisions, with promotion and relegation.
World Rugby Pacific Nations Cup	Fiji, Samoa, Tonga	2006	2025	Annually	Originally Pacific Five Nations — replaced the Pacific Tri-Nations. The original teams were Australia A, the Junior All Blacks (New Zealand's official "A" side), and the three Pacific Island nations. In 2008, the New Zealand Māori replaced the Junior All Blacks. From 2010-2012, only the Pacific Island nations and Japan participated who were then joined by Canada and USA. Due to their inclusion in the Quadrangular tournament in South Africa, Samoa did not feature in the 2013 edition of the Pacific Nations Cup., to the competition in 2014. Canada, Japan, and the USA withdrew for the 2016 and 2017 editions due to commitments to 2019 Rugby World Cup qualification.
World Rugby Pacific Challenge	Fiji Warriors, Junior Japan, Samoa A, Tonga A	2006	2025	Annually	Originally Pacific Rugby Cup. Introduced in 2006 with two developmental sides each from Fiji, Samoa, and Tonga. Since 2011, the three Pacific nations have been represented by their A sides, and Junior Japan (that country's A side) joined them as a core team in 2013. At various times, Super Rugby academy teams and Argentine developmental side Pampas XV have also featured.
Nations Championship	Argentina, Australia, England, Fiji, France, Ireland, Italy, Japan, New Zealand, Scotland, South Africa, Wales	2026	2026	Biennial	Contested in even-numbered years across the mid-year (July) and end-of-year (November) international windows, replacing traditional summer and autumn test series in non-World Cup and non-Lions tour years. Teams are split into a European Conference (Six Nations) and a SANZAAR and Pacific Conference (Rugby Championship nations plus Fiji and Japan), culminating in a finals weekend. Promotion and relegation with the second-tier World Rugby Nations Cup is scheduled to begin in 2030.
Nations Cup	Varies from year to year; the participants in the most recent edition in 2016 were Argentina XV, Italy A, Namibia, Romania, Spain, and Uruguay.	2006	2015	Annually	Argentina XV were formerly known as Argentina A and Argentina Jaguars. The inaugural tournament in 2006 featured Argentina A, Italy A, Portugal and Russia.
Americas Rugby Championship	Argentina XV, Brazil, Canada, Chile, United States, and Uruguay.	2009	2019	Annually	Originally involved Canadian regional sides plus a USA developmental side and Argentina XV (then known as Argentina Jaguars). Later editions mostly featured national A sides, though Uruguay normally sent its senior national team. Following a hiatus in 2015 to accommodate that year's Rugby World Cup, the competition was relaunched in 2016 with its current lineup of teams, all senior national sides except for Argentina XV. Americas Rugby Championship]] – Originated with four franchised Canadian teams, the Argentina Jaguars, and a "USA Select XV" (effectively the USA A national team). Relaunched in 2016 as the Western Hemisphere's equivalent to the Six Nations Championship; see the table of international competitions for more details.
Asia Rugby Championship	Top three Asian sides	2008	2025	Annually	Originally known as the Asian Five Nations; the inaugural tournament in 2008 featured Japan, Korea, Hong Kong, Kazakhstan and Arabian Gulf. Tournament renamed as Asia Rugby Championship in 2015, with the top division reduced to three teams playing in a home-and-away "Tri Nations" format. Yearly promotion and relegation with three lower divisions.

- Four Nations Tournament — Belgium, Spain, Welsh club XV, France amateur
- Pan-American Championship — Uruguay, Canada, United States and Argentina
- South American Rugby Championship
- Super Cup — Canada, Japan, Russia and United States (formerly called the Super Powers Cup)
- World Rugby Under 20 Championship — First-tier worldwide competition for under-20 men; replaced Under 19 and Under 21 World Championships starting in 2008
- World Rugby Under 20 Trophy — Second-tier worldwide competition for under-20 men
- Autumn internationals — A name which refers to a series of Tests which take place usually in November each year in the Northern Hemisphere
- Summer internationals — A name which refers to a series of Tests which take place usually in July each year in the Southern Hemisphere
- Africa Cup — The main tournament for African nations.
- CAR Super 16 — A regional tournament for African nations below the Africa Cup.
- Viking Tri-nations Rugby A rugby tournament Played by Norway, Denmark, and since 2011 Sweden.

See also:

- Rugby union at the Summer Olympics
- Rugby union tours
- Women's international rugby

== Club and provincial tournaments ==
=== Intercontinental ===
- United Rugby Championship — provincial/regional teams from Ireland, Italy, Scotland, South Africa and Wales. The competition began as the Celtic League, restricted to the three Celtic nations; became Pro12 when two Italian teams joined in 2010–11 and Pro14 when two South African teams joined in 2017–18. In 2021 the name was changed to United Rugby Championship.
- Global Rapid Rugby — currently on hold due to the COVID-19 pandemic, with an uncertain future. It was established in 2019 involving six professional teams from Australia, Asia and the Pacific.
- Super Rugby Pacific — Super Rugby Pacific is the top professional rugby union competition in the Southern Hemisphere, featuring clubs from Australia, New Zealand, and the Pacific Islands.

=== Africa ===
==== South Africa ====
- Currie Cup — South African provincial tournament
- SA Cup (South Africa) — Launched in 2024 for provincial teams not part of the URC. Qualifier competition for Currie Cup from 2025
- Varsity Rugby — a two-tier annual South African inter-university competition
- Gold Cup — an annual South African inter-club competition, also featuring invitational teams from Namibia and Zimbabwe

==== Ghana ====
- Ghana Rugby Club Championship (GRCC) — The top tier rugby union competition in Ghana since 2014.

==== Kenya ====
- Kenya Cup — The top tier rugby union competition in Kenya since 1970.

=== Americas ===
==== SRA ====
- Super Rugby Americas - is a professional rugby union competition and the top-level championship for many countries in South America.

==== Argentina ====
- Nacional de Clubes - Club competition in Argentina
- Torneo de la URBA - Club competition for teams from Buenos Aires and Rosario
- Torneo del Interior - Club competition for teams outside Buenos Aires

==== Brazil ====
- Campeonato Brasileiro de Rugby - Club competition in Brazil

==== Canada ====
- Major League Rugby
- Canadian Rugby Championship - NB: Now defunct, it was the successor to Rugby Canada Super League

==== United States ====
- Major League Rugby - a professional men’s league representing the highest level of rugby competition in North America.
- Women's Elite Rugby - a women's rugby union club competition at the top level of the United States rugby union system.
- USA Club Rugby XVs - The national amateur and semi professional club championship.
- USA Rugby Women's Premier League (USARWPL) - Former Women's club competition in the United States

==== Uruguay ====
- Club Championship - Club competition in Uruguay

=== Asia ===
==== Hong Kong ====
- Hong Kong Premiership - Hong Kong club teams

==== India ====
- Rugby Premier League - Indian rugby sevens league
- All India & South Asia Rugby Tournament - Indian club knockout tournament

==== Japan ====
- Rugby League One First Division – League for Japanese corporate teams
- Rugby League One Second Division – Second-tier league for Japanese corporate teams
- All-Japan Rugby Football Championship

==== Korea ====
- Korea Super Rugby League

==== Malaysia ====
- MRU Super League - Malaysian club teams
- MRU Super Cup - Malaysian club knockout tournament

==== Pakistan ====
- Pakistan National Rugby Championship - annual domestic competition

==== Sri Lanka ====
- Clifford Cup - Sri Lanka Division 'A' teams (end of season knockout tournament)
- Sri Lanka Rugby Championship (Dialog Rugby League) - Sri Lanka Division 'A' club teams

=== Europe ===
- European Rugby Champions Cup — Replaced the Heineken Cup effective with the 2014–15 season, although it claims the history of the former competition as its own. European club, provincial and regional teams, currently from the countries that participate in the Six Nations.
- European Rugby Challenge Cup — Replaced the original European Challenge Cup in 2014–15; also claims the history of its predecessor as its own. Second-tier European club, provincial and regional teams knock-out tournament, also involving all of the Six Nations countries, with possible involvement from lower-tier countries (see below).
- European Rugby Continental Shield – Third-tier competition involving teams from Italy's Top12, plus clubs from lower-tier countries; determines two places in each year's Challenge Cup. Originally known as the European Rugby Challenge Cup Qualifying Competition; current name adopted in 2016–17.
- Rugby Europe Super Cup - Third tier of European club rugby 2021.
- Copa Ibérica de Rugby — Annual competition between Spanish and Portuguese clubs.
- Anglo-Welsh Cup — English and Welsh clubs knock-out tournament. From 1971–2005, open to all English clubs with no involvement from any other nation; from the 2005–06 season, has featured the 12 Premiership clubs and the four Welsh regional sides competing in Pro12.
- British and Irish Cup — Tournament launched in 2009 featuring sides from second-level leagues in England and Wales, plus second-tier sides from Ireland and Scotland.
- Regional Rugby Championship — Tournament launched in 2007 involving teams from Bosnia & Herzegovina, Croatia, Hungary, Montenegro and Serbia.

==== England ====
===== Men =====
- Gallagher Premiership - English clubs, top tier
- RFU Championship - English clubs, second tier
- National League 1
- National League 2 North
- National League 2 South
- Northern Division - North 2 East
- Midlands 6 East (NW)

===== Women =====
- Premiership Women's Rugby – top flight

==== France ====
===== Men’s =====
- Top 14 — French clubs, top tier
- Rugby Pro D2 - French clubs, second tier
- Fédérale 1
- Fédérale 2
- Fédérale 3
- Challenge Yves du Manoir
- Coupe de l'Espérance
- Coupe de France

===== Women’s =====
- Élite 1 - top tier

==== Ireland ====
- All Ireland League (AIL/AIB League) — Irish clubs from all 32 counties.

==== Italy ====
- Top12 — Italian clubs, top tier
- A Series — Italian clubs, second-level championship where winners can jump up to Top12.
- B Series — Italian clubs, third-level league, winners can play on A Series.
- C Series — Italian clubs, the lowest-tier for local teams. Winners are promoted to B Series.

==== Scotland ====
- Super 6
- Scottish Premiership
- Scottish National League Division One
- Scottish National League Division Two
- Scottish National League Division Three
- Caledonia Regional League
- East Regional League
- West Regional League
- Border League
- Scottish Cup

==== Wales ====
- Welsh Premier Division
- WRU Division One East
- WRU Division One West
- WRU Division Two East
- WRU Division Two West
- WRU Division Three East
- WRU Division Three South East
- WRU Division Three South West
- WRU Division Three West
- WRU Division Four East
- WRU Division Four South East
- WRU Division Four South West
- WRU Division Four West
- WRU Division Five East
- WRU Division Five South Central
- WRU Division Five South East
- WRU Division Five South West
- WRU Division Five West
- WRU Division Six East
- WRU Division Six South East
- WRU Division Six Central
- WRU Division Six West
- WRU Division One North
- WRU Division Two North

==== Austria ====
- 1. Rugby Bundesliga

==== Belgium ====
- Belgian Elite League

==== Czech Republic ====
- Extraliga

==== Denmark ====
- DRU Superliga

==== Finland ====
- Finnish Championship League

==== Georgia ====
- Didi 10

==== Germany ====
- Rugby-Bundesliga

==== Malta ====
- Malta Rugby Union National Championship

==== Netherlands ====
- Ereklasse

==== Norway ====
- Norway Rugby Championship

==== Poland ====
- Ekstraliga

==== Portugal ====
- Campeonato Português de Rugby — Portuguese clubs
- Campeonato Nacional de Rugby I Divisão
- Campeonato Nacional de Rugby II Divisão
- Taça de Portugal
- Supertaça de Portugal

==== Romania ====
- SuperLiga

==== Russia ====
- Professional Rugby League - Russian club competition

==== Spain ====
- División de Honor

==== Sweden ====
- Allsvenskan

==== Ukraine ====
- Superliga

=== Oceania ===
- Super Rugby — teams from Australia, New Zealand, and the Pacific (known originally as Super 12 and later as Super 14; the name "Super Rugby" was officially adopted from 2011. It is now known as 'Super Rugby Pacific' for the upcoming 2022 season).
- Pacific Rugby Cup - Franchise teams from Fiji, Tonga & Samoa

==== Australia ====
- Shute Shield - Sydney and regional NSW club teams
- Tooheys New Cup - Sydney club teams
- New South Wales Suburban Rugby Union - lower level suburban rugby in Sydney, the largest centrally administered rugby competition in the world.
- Queensland Premier Rugby - Queensland club competition

==== Fiji ====
- Farebrother Sullivan Trophy — Challenge
- Marama Championship — Fiji's women's Local competition
- Skipper Cup— Fiji's Local competition between 10 Districts

==== New Zealand ====
===== Men =====
- Mitre 10 Cup — New Zealand professional provincial tournament
- Heartland Championship — New Zealand amateur provincial tournament
- Ranfurly Shield — New Zealand provincial challenge trophy

===== Women =====
- Super Rugby Aupiki — New Zealand professional provincial tournament
- Farah Palmer Cup — New Zealand amateur provincial tournament

== Sevens tournaments ==
- Rugby World Cup Sevens — Sponsored by World Rugby, and held every four years, this was the highest prize in the Sevens version of the game before the introduction of sevens to the Olympics in 2016. It was initially planned for the 2013 edition to be the last, but it was later decided to retain the World Cup Sevens and establish a new four-year cycle starting in 2018.
- World Rugby Sevens Series — Annual WR-sponsored series of tournaments for men's national Sevens teams. As of the upcoming 2017–18 series, the events in the series are (in order of play):
  - Dubai Sevens
  - South Africa Sevens
  - Australian Sevens
  - New Zealand Sevens
  - USA Sevens
  - Canada Sevens
  - Hong Kong Sevens, traditionally the biggest annual event in Sevens
  - Singapore Sevens
  - France Sevens
  - London Sevens
- World Rugby Women's Sevens Series — Annual WR-sponsored series of tournaments for women's national Sevens teams. As of the most recent 2016–17 series, the events are (in order of play):
  - Dubai Women's Sevens
  - Australian Women's Sevens
  - USA Women's Sevens
  - Japan Women's Sevens
  - Canada Women's Sevens
  - France Women's Sevens
- The National Schools Sevens - held at Rosslyn Park, in England, the biggest sevens competition in the world. News, photos and up to the minute results can be found on the official website . Results can also be seen on The Schools' Rugby Website
- Commonwealth Games — Quadrennial; most recent tournament in 2014. Men only through 2014; first women's event to be held in 2018.
- Other:
  - Amsterdam Sevens
  - Bangkok Sevens
  - Benidorm Sevens
  - Bogota Sevens
  - Caldy Sevens
  - Cape Fear Sevens
  - Caribbean Sevens
  - Cayman Sevens
  - Cwmtawe Sevens
  - Heidelberg Sevens
  - Henley Sevens
  - Kinsale Sevens
  - Kiama Sevens
  - Lisbon Sevens
  - Melrose Sevens
  - Middlesex Sevens
  - Neuchatel Sevens
  - New York Sevens
  - Northern Sevens
  - Punta del Este Sevens
  - Rome Sevens
  - Safari Sevens
  - Scandinavian Sevens
  - Singapore Sevens
  - Sofia Sevens
  - Santa Teresa Sevens
  - Sri Lanka Sevens

== Other tournaments ==
- Sanix World Rugby Youth Tournament held annually in Japan
- English Colts Club Knockout Cup — Held annually
- Ulster Schools Cup — Annual schools competition
- Munster Schools Senior Cup — Annual schools competition
- Craven Week — Annual South Africa schools competition
- Bingham Cup — Held every two years, this is the largest international gay rugby tournament and honours 9/11 hero, Mark Bingham
- Rugby union at the Maccabiah Games: representative XVs from various countries have been taking part in the Maccabiah Games since 1981.

Mad River/Stowe 15's Tournament. Started in 1972 held now in Stowe, VT typically the last weekend in June at the Polo Grounds.

== International trophies ==
The trophies in this list are regularly contested between two nations. Some of the competitions for these trophies form part of other international tournaments, such as the Six Nations and The Rugby Championship.

=== Six Nations Trophies ===
- Six Nations Championship Trophy, since 2015
- Triple Crown Trophy, since 2006
- Calcutta Cup — England and Scotland, since 1879
- Centenary Quaich - Ireland and Scotland, since 1989
- Millennium Trophy — England and Ireland, since 1988
- Giuseppe Garibaldi Trophy — France and Italy, since 2007
- Auld Alliance Trophy - Scotland and France, since 2018

=== Trophies in The Rugby Championship ===
- Bledisloe Cup — Australia and New Zealand, since 1931
- Mandela Challenge Plate — Australia and South Africa, since 2000
- Freedom Cup — New Zealand and South Africa, since 2004
- Puma Trophy — Argentina and Australia

=== Other Trophies ===
- Anexartisias Cup (Independence Cup) — Cyprus and Greece
- Antim Cup — Georgia and Romania
- Dave Gallaher Trophy — France and New Zealand
- Ella–Mobbs Trophy — Australia and England
- Elgon Cup — Kenya and Uganda
- Killik Cup — Barbarians and any other national team
- Hillary Shield — England and New Zealand
- Hopetoun Cup — Australia and Scotland
- James Bevan Trophy — Australia and Wales
- Lansdowne Cup — Australia and Ireland
- Prince William Cup — South Africa and Wales
- Trophée des Bicentenaires — Australia and France
- Tom Richards Trophy— Australia and the British and Irish Lions
- Raeburn Shield— Hypothetical World Title Shield
- Utrecht Shield— Hypothetical Women's World Title Shield
