= Project 7s =

Planned international rugby sevens club competition

- Sport: Rugby sevens
- First season: 2026 (planned)
- Organizing body: Bia Sports
- No. of teams: 7 (planned)

Project 7s is the tentative name for a planned international professional rugby sevens league organized by Bia Sports. Operating under a franchise model, seven clubs are intended to join, fielding both men's and women's teams. Its competition will consist of seven one-day tournaments during summer, and will use a heavily-modified variant of rugby sevens with a single period, power plays and "cannon ball starts". Project 7s plans to commence play in August 2026.

== History ==
The Bia Sports Group, owners of Sunderland A.F.C. and the FIM Supercross World Championship, founded Project 7s in 2025 after raising an "eight-figure sum" of seed funding. Bia Sports' primary motivation was to service a growing audience for rugby sevens, which they believed to be underserved, and to foster more professional opportunities for players. The league's establishment was publicised through a news report by SportsPro that July. Its inaugural season is planned to start in August 2026.

== Format ==
Project 7s will employ a seven-week schedule commencing in August, with a single-elimination tournament held every Thursday night, lasting up to four hours each. The tournaments are expected to be held in 20,000–25,000 capacity venues, located primarily in Europe. Craven Cottage in London, and undisclosed venues in Paris and Rome, are being targeted as host venues. Project 7s will use a heavily-modified variant of rugby sevens – the game will be played with a single period instead of two halves, play commences with "cannon ball starts" instead of kick-offs, and a power play system will be implemented.

== Teams ==
Project 7s will operate under a franchise model, with seven clubs fielding teams into both the men's and women's competitions. Bia Sports are aiming to sell the seven franchises for more than £1 million each.

== See also ==
- Premier Rugby Sevens
- Rugby Premier League
- List of rugby union competitions
- List of women's rugby sevens competitions
