= Rugby competitions =

For rugby competitions see:

- List of rugby union competitions
- List of rugby league competitions
