= Cape Town Stadium =

Stadium in Cape Town, South Africa

DHL Stadium (Cape Town Stadium)
- The aerial view of the stadium
- Interactive map of DHL Stadium (Cape Town Stadium)
- Full name: DHL Stadium
- Location: Fritz Sonnenberg Road, Green Point, Cape Town, South Africa
- Coordinates: 33°54′12″S 18°24′40″E
- Owner: City of Cape Town
- Capacity: 55,000
- Surface: Grass
- Field size: 125m x 68m

Construction
- Groundbreaking: 26 March 2007; 19 years ago
- Built: 2007–2009
- Opened: 14 December 2009; 16 years ago
- Cost: R 4.4 billion (US$ 600 million £ 415 million)
- Architects: GMP Architects, Louis Karol Architects, Point Architects
- General contractor: Murray & Roberts/ WBHO

Tenants
- Cape Town Spurs F.C. (2010–2021); Cape Town City F.C. (2016–present); WP Rugby Union (2021–present); Stormers XXIII (2021–present); Stormers (2021–present); South Africa national rugby union team (selected matches)

The Cape Town Stadium (Afrikaans: Kaapstad-stadion; Xhosa: Inkundla yezemidlalo yaseKapa; known since 2021 as the DHL Stadium for sponsorship reasons) is a football (soccer) and rugby union stadium in Cape Town, South Africa, that was built as part of the country's hosting of the 2010 FIFA World Cup.

During the planning stage, it was known as the Green Point Stadium, which was the name of the older stadium on an adjacent site, and this name was also used frequently during World Cup media coverage. It is the home ground of WP Rugby, the Stormers XXIII and the Stormers (since 2021), and was used by Cape Town City from 2016 when they played in the Premiership. It has also hosted the South Africa Sevens rugby tournament since 2015 and hosted the Rugby 7s World Cup in 2022.

The stadium is located in Green Point, between Signal Hill and the Atlantic Ocean, close to the Cape Town city center and to the Victoria & Alfred Waterfront, a popular tourist and shopping venue.

The stadium had a seating capacity of 64,100 during the 2010 World Cup, later reduced to 55,000.

Cape Town Stadium is the largest stadium in Cape Town, and the fifth-largest in South Africa.

== Naming ==
Location of the stadium in the Cape Town metropolitan area

During construction, Cape Town Stadium was unofficially known as Green Point Stadium; the name of an older stadium, then-situated adjacent to it, that was partially demolished and rebuilt into the Green Point Athletics Stadium.

During October 2009, the city asked for the public to propose names for the new stadium and the name Cape Town Stadium was chosen.

With effect from June 2021, the City of Cape Town as owner of the stadium, through a municipal entity, concluded a multi-year sponsorship agreement with DHL for (originally) a period of four years, from 2021 to 2025. It included renaming the stadium to the DHL Stadium which as of 2025 has since been renewed.

In this regard, Peter-John Veldhuizen, chairperson of the Board of the Cape Town Stadium (RF) Soc Ltd said: "DHL’s contribution as our naming rights partner has certainly made a significant impact on the bottom line of the business". As a result, in 2022–2022 the revenue target was exceeded by 30% and the grant funding from the City of Cape Town was reduced from R61m to R42m.

== Previous stadium ==
The old stadium

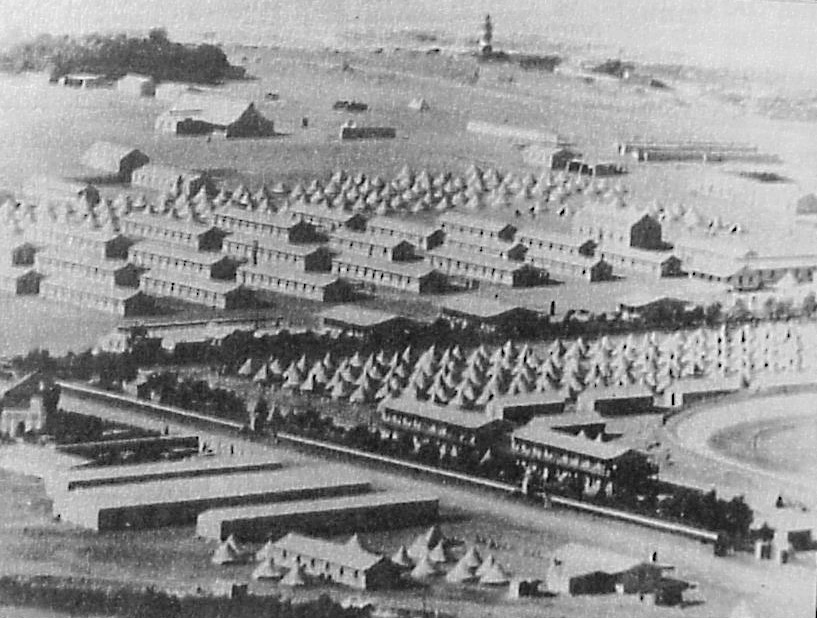
The beginnings of the former Green Point Stadium during the Second Boer War

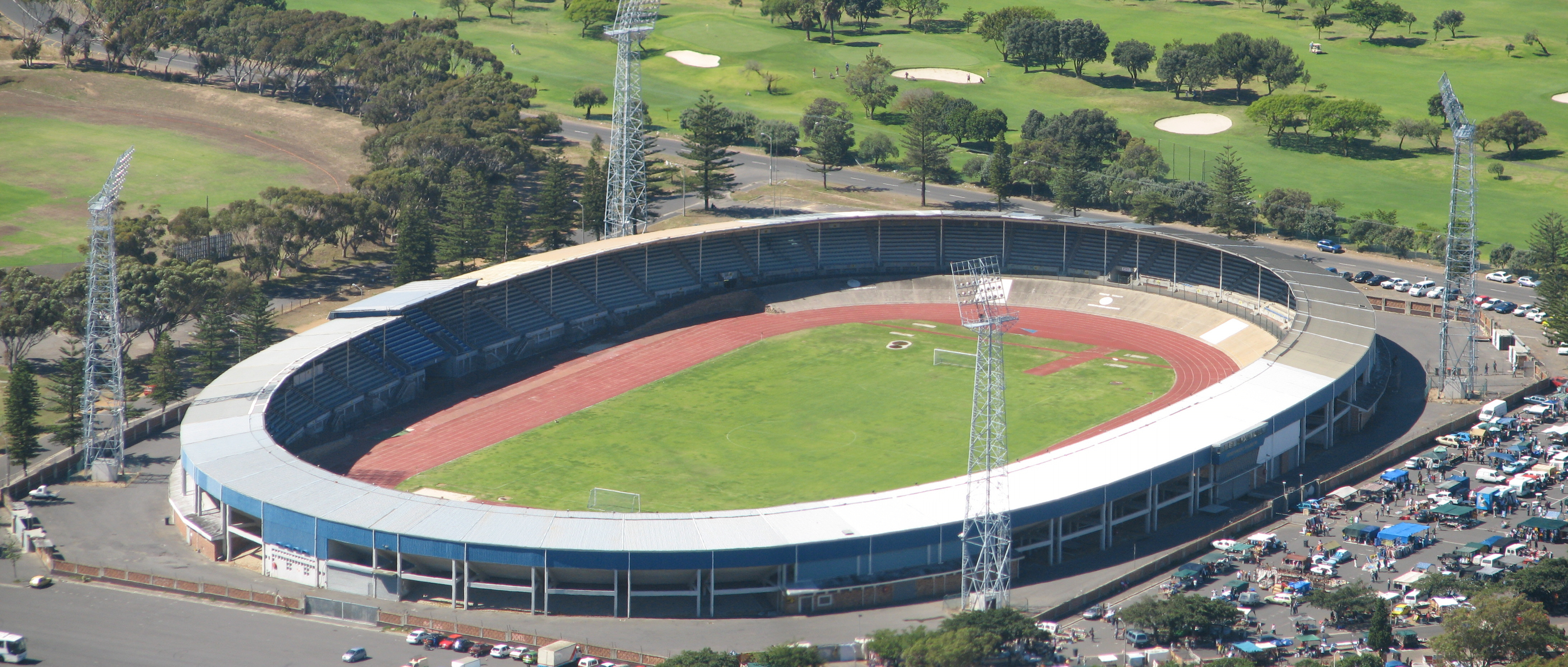
Aerial view of the old Green Point Stadium, which was partly demolished and rebuilt during 2007

The stadium is adjacent to the site of the original 18,000 seater stadium Green Point Stadium. It replaces a portion of the Metropolitan Golf Club site which has now been realigned.

The previous stadium, originally constructed in 1897 and which was partly demolished in 2007 and rebuilt in 2013 as the Green Point Athletics Stadium, was a multi-purpose stadium used for cycling, athletics, cricket and soccer. Later used mainly for soccer matches, it was the home ground of Santos Football Club and Ajax Cape Town at different points. It also hosted music concerts, including the November 2003 46664 Concert for the benefit of AIDS victims. The section of the old stadium that remained was redeveloped into the Green Point Athletics Stadium, which opened in 2015 with a seating capacity of 4500.

== Design ==
An aerial view of the stadium from just above its roof.

Cape Town stadium viewed from Signal Hill

Construction of the Cape Town Stadium, located on the Green Point Common, began in March 2007.

In 33 months, joint venture contractors Murray & Roberts, now known as Concor and WBHO completed the project at a cost of R4.4billion – or approximately US$600million.

The project architects were an association between GMP Architects of Germany and local firms, Louis Karol Architects and the joint venture practice Point Architects comprising Comrie Wilkinson Architects and Urban Designers, Jakupa Architects and Urban Designers, Munnik Visser Architects and Paragon Architects. The lead urban designer for the 18hactare stadium precinct was Henri Comrie.

The structural engineers comprised a joint venture between BKS, Henry Fagan & Partners, KFD Wilkinson, Goba, Iliso and Arcus Gibb.

== Handing over ==
Cape Town Stadium was officially handed over to the City of Cape Town on schedule on 14 December 2009. At a ceremony in front of over 200 invited guests and the media representatives from around the world, Cape Town Executive Mayor Alderman Dan Plato, received the keys to the stadium officially confirming the opening of Cape Town Stadium.

The pedestrian route from the central city to the stadium was designated as the Fanwalk, highlighting local businesses and providing entertainment, while promoting crowd safety.

== After the World Cup ==
A consortium consisting of South Africa's Sail Group and French-based Stade de France were awarded the service contract to operate the stadium and ensure that it remains a sustainable multi-purpose venue after the 2010 FIFA World Cup. The consortium, called Business Venture Investments 1317, was involved in the management of the stadium from January 2009 onwards. The city municipality paid the consortium to manage the stadium up to and during the World Cup, after which the consortium will lease the stadium from the city for a period of not less than 10 years and not more than 30 years.

However, in December 2010 the Sail/Stade de France consortium cancelled the lease. Reports in the media at the time said that the consortium considered the agreement as non-viable. The City subsequently took over management of the stadium.

Following the World Cup, temporary rows of seating on either side on the top tier were replaced by events suites and clubrooms, reducing the stadium's capacity to 55,000. The stadium features corporate hospitality suites, medical, training, and conferencing and banqueting facilities. The consortium will operate the stadium as well as manage and maintain the defined areas of the surrounding urban park and sport precinct on the 85-hectare Greenpoint Common from stadium revenue.

The Greenpoint Park was completed within a year of the World Cup ending as was promised to the people of Cape Town during the public consultation process preceding stadium construction. The park has since become one of Cape Town's most popular recreational facilities and has acted as a catalyst for significant improvements to surrounding buildings and spaces through spontaneous private sector investment.

Ajax Cape Town used the stadium as their home ground from the 2010–11 season. Due to the stadium's ongoing financial problems, the City of Cape Town had sought to acquire Western Province rugby union as an "anchor tenant". After four years of talks, Western Province announced in December 2014 that they had decided to remain at Newlands Stadium. In March 2015, the South African Rugby Union announced that the South Africa Sevens tournament would be staged at Cape Town Stadium for four years, beginning in December 2015.

In June 2016, it was announced that new Premiership club Cape Town City would also play at Cape Town Stadium.

In late 2020, Western Province RFU announced that they were selling their longtime home of Newlands Stadium to developers, who planned to demolish the ground and convert it to a mixed-use development. From 2021 onwards, franchise rugby union team Stormers and Currie Cup side WP have called Cape Town Stadium home, and the stadium has hosted international rugby union tests played in Cape Town.

In 2023, after complaints about pitch quality intensified the previous season, the pitch was relaid with a hybrid turf, 50% synthetic and 50% grass.

== Cape Town Stadium (RF) SOC Ltd ==
The Cape Town Stadium (RF) SOC Ltd, a municipal entity of the City of Cape Town, was formed in 2018 to provide various operational services to the stadium.

In 2021 the Entity entered into a sponsorships agreement with DHL, granting naming rights to the company. Since then the stadium has officially been known as the DHL Stadium.

== Inaugural games ==
The first game to be hosted at the new Cape Town Stadium was a Cape Town derby between Ajax Cape Town and Santos on 23 January 2010 as part of the official inauguration of the stadium. Only 20,000 tickets were made available for the event and were sold out by Friday 15 January 2010. The Soccer Festival had entertainment from local band Freshlyground and a Vuvuzela orchestra performance during half time.

Date	Time (SAST)	Team 1	Res.	Team 2	Attendance
23 January 2010	16:00	(South Africa) Ajax Cape Town	0–0 (5–6 pen.)	(South Africa) Santos	20,000

The second of three 'dry runs' at the new Cape Town Stadium was another Cape Town derby. Local Cape Town rugby teams, The Vodacom Stormers and the Boland Inv. XV battled it out at the Cape Town Rugby Festival that took place on 6 February 2010. The Rugby Festival had entertainment from local band Flat Stanley. Only 40,000 tickets were made available for the event. This was double the amount that attended the Soccer Festival.

Date	Time (SAST)	Team 1	Res.	Team 2	Attendance
6 February 2010	16:15	(South Africa) Stormers	47–13	(South Africa) Boland Inv. XV	40,000

Cape Town Stadium hosted its third test event on Monday 22 March, during which all 55,000 permanent seats were available for the first time. A total of 52,000 tickets were sold.

‘Cape Town For Jesus', a religious gathering addressed by South African evangelist Angus Buchan, was the first major non-sporting event hosted at the stadium, and gave the stadium operators another chance to test their readiness ahead of the 2010 FIFA World Cup.

Date	Time (SAST)	Event	Capacity	Attendance
22 March 2010	13:00	Cape Town For Jesus	55,000	52,000

Cape Town Stadium hosted its fourth and final test event on Saturday 10 April. This was the first time that the stadium was utilised at night, for the International Under-20 Soccer Challenge between South Africa, Brazil, Nigeria and Ghana. About 40,000 attended the event that tested the stadium's readiness for the 2010 FIFA World Cup.

Date	Time (SAST)	Team 1	Res.	Team 2	Attendance
10 April 2010	18:00	Ghana U-20	0–1	Brazil U-20	40,000
10 April 2010	20:30	South Africa U-20	1–3	Nigeria U-20	40,000

== Sporting and events ==
=== 2010 FIFA World Cup ===
In the 2010 FIFA World Cup, Cape Town Stadium hosted five first round matches, one second round, one quarter-final, and one semi-final. During the World Cup, all FIFA media referred to the stadium as 'Green Point Stadium'.

=== Matches ===
Date	Team #1	Result	Team #2	Round	Attendance
11 June 2010	Uruguay	0–0	France	Group A	64,100
14 June 2010	Italy	1–1	Paraguay	Group F	62,869
18 June 2010	England	0–0	Algeria	Group C	64,100
21 June 2010	Portugal	7–0	North Korea	Group G	63,644
24 June 2010	Cameroon	1–2	Netherlands	Group E	63,093
29 June 2010	Spain	1–0	Portugal	Round of 16	62,955
3 July 2010	Argentina	0–4	Germany	Quarter-finals	64,100
6 July 2010	Uruguay	2–3	Netherlands	Semi-finals	62,479

=== International friendlies ===
On 17 November 2010, the Cape Town Stadium hosted its first international friendly. The match was between South Africa and the USA, where they played for the Nelson Mandela Challenge Trophy.

Date	Team 1	Result	Team 2	Attendance
17 November 2010	South Africa	0–1	United States	52,000
19 January 2011	Botswana	1–2	Sweden	2,000
21 July 2012	(South Africa) Ajax Cape Town	1–1	(England) Manchester United	53,000
8 January 2012	South Africa	0–1	Norway	55,000
21 January 2013	(South Africa) Jomo Cosmos	0–4	(Switzerland) Grasshopper Club Zürich	100
26 January 2013	(South Africa) Ajax Cape Town	2–1	(Switzerland) Grasshopper Club Zürich	200
23 March 2013	South Africa	2–0	Central African Republic	36,740
19 November 2024	South Africa	3–0	South Sudan	45,340

=== Rugby union ===
The stadium hosts numerous rugby matches each year. Prior to 2021, the stadium hosted several Stormers matches when they couldn't play at their previous home ground in Newlands. Western Province Rugby and the Stormers have used the stadium as their home ground for both the domestic Currie Cup and international United Rugby Championship (URC) competitions. During their first season at their new home, the Stormers defeated their South African rivals, the Bulls, to win the URC Final at the stadium. The Stormer's success in the URC qualified the team to compete in the European Rugby Championship during the 2022/23 season with several matches being hosted at the stadium, in addition to those for the Currie Cup and URC. The stadium also played host to the Stormers' URC playoff matches during the 2022/23 season after they won home field advantage, including the URC Final played on 27 May 2023.

The stadium has also hosted international rugby union matches played by South Africa's Springboks. In July 2021 the Springboks defeated the British & Irish Lions in a 3 match series that were hosted at the stadium. No fans were permitted to attend due to COVID-19. In July 2022, the Springboks defeated Wales in what was South African lock Eben Etzebeth's 100th test for the national team. In 2024 during the Rugby Championship The Springboks defeated All Blacks at this venue. In 2025 the Springboks defeated the Barbarians and Wallabies at the stadium. As part of the Rugby's Greatest Rivalry tour in 2026 this stadium hosted 2 matches with the All Blacks facing the Stormers and Springboks.

Date	Team #1	Score	Team #2	Attendance
3 February 2019	(South Africa) Stormers	33–28	(South Africa) Bulls	50,000
14 July 2021	South Africa A	17–13	British & Irish Lions	0
17 July 2021	(South Africa) Stormers	3–49	British & Irish Lions	0
24 July 2021	South Africa	17–22	British & Irish Lions	0
31 July 2021	South Africa	27–9	British & Irish Lions	0
7 August 2021	South Africa	19–16	British & Irish Lions	0
18 June 2022	(South Africa) Stormers	18–13	(South Africa) Bulls	31,000
16 July 2022	South Africa	30–14	Wales	56,000
27 May 2023	(South Africa) Stormers	14–19	(Ireland) Munster	56,344
7 September 2024	South Africa	18–12	New Zealand	58,310
28 June 2025	South Africa	54–7	Barbarians	45,000
23 August 2025	South Africa	30–22	Australia	56,350
7 August 2026	(South Africa) Stormers	21–38	New Zealand	47,130
29 August 2026	South Africa	33–26	New Zealand	56,589

=== World Rugby Sevens Series ===
See also World Rugby Sevens Series

The World Rugby Sevens Series hosts a tournament each year in Cape Town, traditionally in December. It was played annually from 2015 to 2019. However, no tournaments took place during 2020 and 2021 due to the COVID-19 pandemic. However, the competition returned to Cape Town during the 2022–23 season.

Date	Event year	Winner
12–13 December 2015	2015 South Africa Sevens	South Africa
10–11 December 2016	2016 South Africa Sevens	England
9–10 December 2017	2017 South Africa Sevens	New Zealand
8–9 December 2018	2018 South Africa Sevens	Fiji
13–15 December 2019	2019 South Africa Sevens	New Zealand
9–11 December 2022	2022 South Africa Sevens	Samoa
9–11 December 2022	2022 South Africa Women's Sevens	New Zealand
8–10 December 2023	2023 South Africa Sevens	Argentina (men); Australia (women)
7–8 December 2024	2024 South Africa Sevens	South Africa (men); New Zealand (women)
6–7 December 2025	2025 South Africa Sevens	South Africa (men); Australia (women)

=== 2022 Rugby World Cup Sevens ===
In September 2022, DHL Stadium played host to the Rugby World Cup Sevens. The men's tournament was won by Fiji, who defeated New Zealand in the Final. The women's competition was won by Australia over their cross-Tasmine rivals New Zealand.

=== Tennis ===
The Cape Town Stadium hosted the sixth edition of Roger Federer's Matches for Africa, a series of charity tennis matches. It took place on 7 February 2020 and featured Roger Federer and Rafael Nadal. Federer confirmed the date, location, and opponent during the 2019 edition of Wimbledon. Federer said he had pursued Nadal's participation for two years before a date was agreed upon.

South Africa is the birth country of Federer's mother and the focus of his charitable foundation. The doubles match consisted Roger Federer and American tycoon Bill Gates versus Rafael Nadal and South African entertainer Trevor Noah. Federer and Gates won the match 6–4. In singles, Federer beat Nadal with the score 6–4, 3–6, 6–3. The event was attended by 51,954 people (the highest attendance ever recorded at a tennis match) and more than $3.5 million was raised in aid of children's education in Africa.

Match in Africa 6 Doubles
1	(Switzerland) Roger Federer (United States) Bill Gates	6
2	(Spain) Rafael Nadal (South Africa) Trevor Noah	3

Match in Africa 6 Singles
1	(Spain) Rafael Nadal	4	6	3
2	(Switzerland) Roger Federer	6	3	6

=== Concerts ===
Year	Date	Artist	Tour Name	Attendance
2011	18 February	U2	U2 360° Tour	72,532
2011	11 April	Neil Diamond		-
2011	5 October	Coldplay	Mylo Xyloto Tour	46,670
2011	26 October	Kings of Leon	Come Around Sundown World Tour	40,000+
2012	7 November	Linkin Park	Living Things World Tour	55,000
2012	3 December	Lady Gaga	The Born This Way Ball Tour	39,527
2013	5 February	Red Hot Chili Peppers	I'm With You World Tour	-
2013	7 May	Bon Jovi	Because We Can - The Tour	35,407
2013	8 May	Justin Bieber	Believe Tour	65,000
2013	16 October	Rihanna	Diamonds World Tour	39,616
2014	26 February	Eminem	Rapture Tour	37,825
2014	10 December	Foo Fighters	Sonic Highways World Tour	36,926
2015	15 March	Michael Bublé	To Be Loved Tour	22,060
2015	1 April	One Direction	On the Road Again Tour	51,060
2016	18 February	Lionel Richie	'All the Hits all Night Long’ Global Tour	
2016	26 April	Mariah Carey	The Sweet Sweet Fantasy Tour	35,000
2017	24 February	Dash Berlin; David Guetta; KSHMR; Martin Garrix; DJ Snake etc.	Ultra South Africa	
2017	17 May	Justin Bieber	Purpose World Tour	39,706
2017	25 November	The Bellamy Brothers		
2018	9 February	Afrojack; Armin van Buuren; Axwell /\ Ingrosso; Hardwell etc.	Ultra South Africa	
2018	11 April	Santana		
2019	27–28 March	Ed Sheeran	÷ Tour	96,915 (both nights)
2022	October	Justin Bieber	Cancelled	
2023	1 February	Imagine Dragons	Mercury World Tour	55,000
2024	31 January	Ava Max; Keane; Lloyiso; Maroon 5; Meduza; Will Linley	Calabash South Africa	50,000
2025	23 January	Lee Cole; Goodluck; Matthew Mole; Robbie Williams	Calabash South Africa	51,000

=== Popular culture ===
Cape Town Stadium was featured in the film Safe House (2012). The stadium also features in many local advertising and print media campaigns. It was also featured as a motorsport venue in the video game Dirt 5.

== Incidents ==
On 7 November 2012, shortly before the U.S. rock band Linkin Park was set to perform at the sold-out stadium, gusts of wind caused advertising scaffolding outside the stadium to collapse onto a crowd of people injuring 19 and killing 1; of the 19 injured, 12 were taken to hospital for further treatment.

Prior to a rugby union match between South Africa and New Zealand on 29 August 2026, two passenger jets operated by Airlink performed a low flyover over the stadium; an independent analysis stated that the planes reached as low as 15 metres (49 ft) over the roof. The flyover prompted a review by the South African Civil Aviation Authority.

== Calls for demolition ==
Prior to 2021, several individuals and groups called for the stadium to be demolished due to its under-utilization after the World Cup. Effective utilization and use of the stadium was a political issue in the city. However, beginning in 2021, use of Cape Town Stadium increased significantly when it became the home ground of Western Province Rugby and the DHL Stormers. This move resulted in DHL sponsoring the naming rights to the stadium and significant renovations.

== See also ==
- Lists of stadiums
- List of African stadiums by capacity
- List of stadiums in South Africa
