= History of the Ireland national rugby union team =

The history of the Ireland national rugby union team began in 1875, when Ireland played its first international match, a 0–7 loss against England. Ireland has competed in the Six Nations (formerly known as the Five Nations, and originally known as the Home Nations) rugby tournament since 1883. Ireland has also competed at the Rugby World Cup every four years since its inception.

== Early years ==
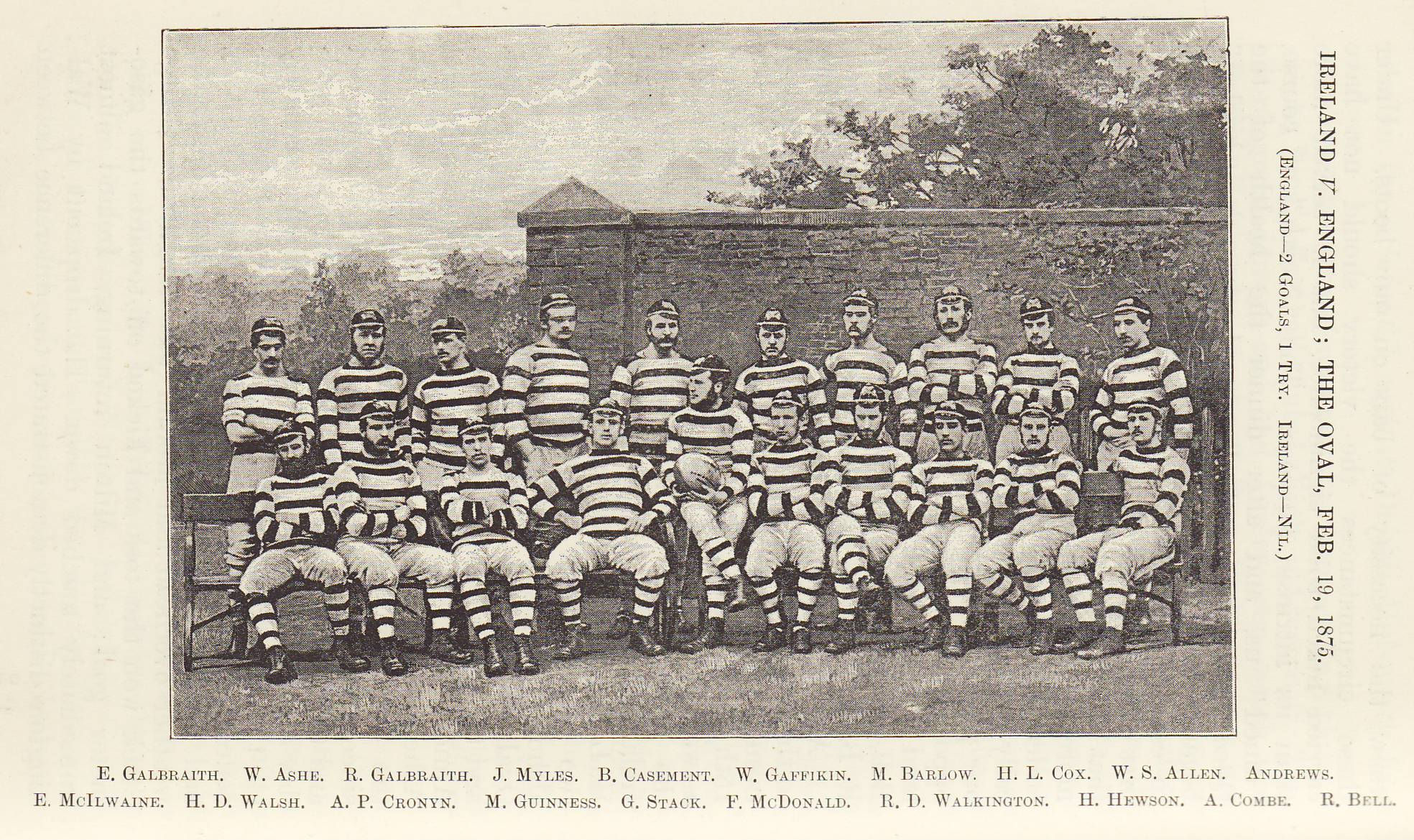
First Ireland rugby team: played England on 19 February 1875 and lost by 2 goals and a try to nil

Dublin University was the first organised rugby football club in Ireland, having been founded in 1854. The club was organised by students who had learnt the game while at English public schools. During the third quarter of the nineteenth century, and following the adoption of a set of official rules in 1868, rugby football began to spread quickly throughout Ireland, resulting in the formation of several other clubs which are still in existence, including NIFC (1868); Wanderers (1869); Queen's University (1869); Youghal (1869); Lansdowne (1873); Dungannon (1873); Co. Carlow (1873); UCC (1874); and Ballinasloe (1875) which amalgamated with Athlone to form Buccaneers.

In 1874, the Irish Football Union (reconstituted as the Irish Rugby Football Union after unification with the North of Ireland Union) was formed by Dublin University Football Club, Wanderers, Engineers, Lansdowne Football Club, Bray, Portora, Dungannon RFC and Monaghan. Ireland lost their first test match against England 7–0 at the Oval on 15 February 1875. Both teams fielded 20 players in this match, as was customary in the early years of rugby union; it was not until 1877 that the number of players was reduced from 20 to 15. Ireland's first home game was also against England in the same year held at the Leinster Cricket Club in Rathmines as Lansdowne Road was deemed unsuitable. The first match at Lansdowne Road was held on 11 March 1878, with England beating Ireland by 2 goals and 1 try to nil.

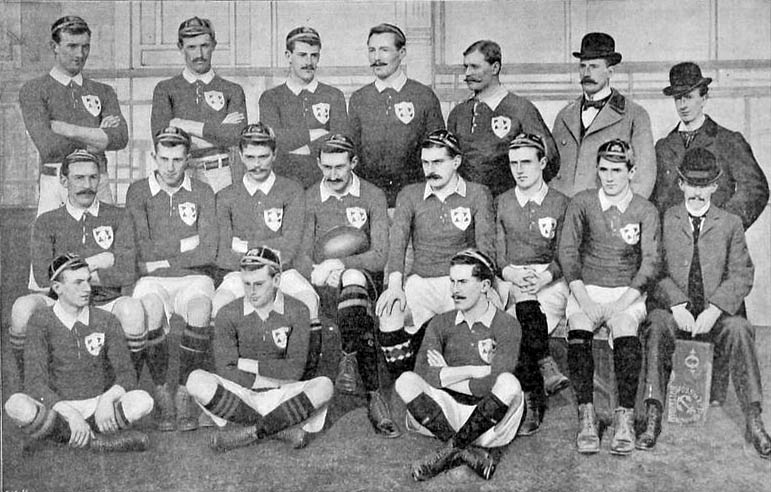
The 1898 Ireland team before playing England

It was not until 1881 that Ireland first won a test, beating Scotland at Ormeau in Belfast. Ireland turned up two men short for their game in Cardiff in 1884 and had to borrow two Welsh players. The first victory Ireland had at Lansdowne Road took place on 5 February 1887. It was also their first win over England, by two goals to nil. On the third of March 1888, Ireland recorded their first win over Wales with a goal, a try and a drop goal to nil.

In 1894, Ireland followed the Welsh model of using seven backs instead of six for the first time. After victory over England at Blackheath, Ireland won back-to-back matches for the first time when recording their first win over Scotland on 24 February 1894. Ireland went on to beat Wales in Belfast and win the Triple Crown for the first time.

In the 1890s, Rugby was primarily a game for the Protestant middle class, the only Catholic in Edmund Forrest's 1894 team was Thomas Crean. Of the eighteen players used in the three games, thirteen were from three Dublin clubs – Wanderers, Dublin University and Bective Rangers – and the remaining five were from Ulster. They went on to win the Home international championship twice more before the old century was out (1896 and 1899), so that by 1901 all four of the Home Unions had tasted success at a game that was growing in popularity with players and spectators.

== Early 20th century: 1901–45 ==
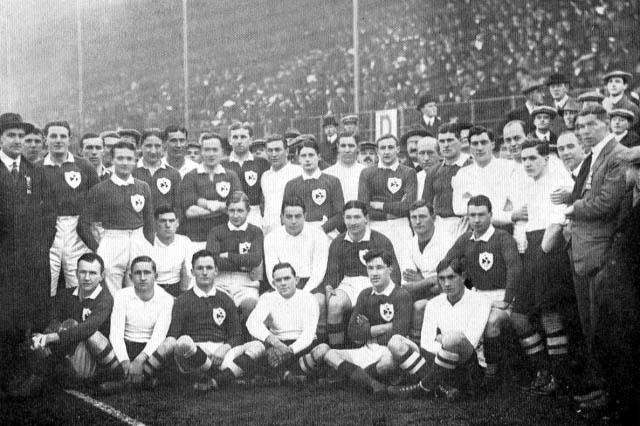
South Africa and Ireland teams posing together at their 1912 test at Lansdowne Road.

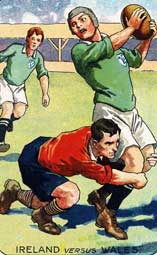
1920 illustration of the Ireland versus Wales match

Such was the level of interest in the visit of the first All Blacks team to Dublin in November 1905 that the IRFU made the match the first all-ticket rugby international in history. Ireland played only seven forwards, copying the then New Zealand method of playing a "rover". The game ended New Zealand 15 Ireland 0.

On 20 March 1909, Ireland played France for the first time, beating them 19–8. This was Ireland's biggest victory in international rugby at that time, their highest points tally and a record five tries. 30 November 1912 was the first time the Springboks met Ireland at Lansdowne Road, the 1906 tour game having been played at Ravenhill. Ireland with seven new caps were overwhelmed by a record margin of 38–0, still a record loss to South Africa who scored 10 tries. In 1926, Ireland went into their final Five Nations match unbeaten and with the Grand Slam at stake lost to Wales in Swansea. Ireland again came close to a grand slam in 1927 when their sole loss was an 8–6 defeat by England.

== Post-war: 1945–59 ==
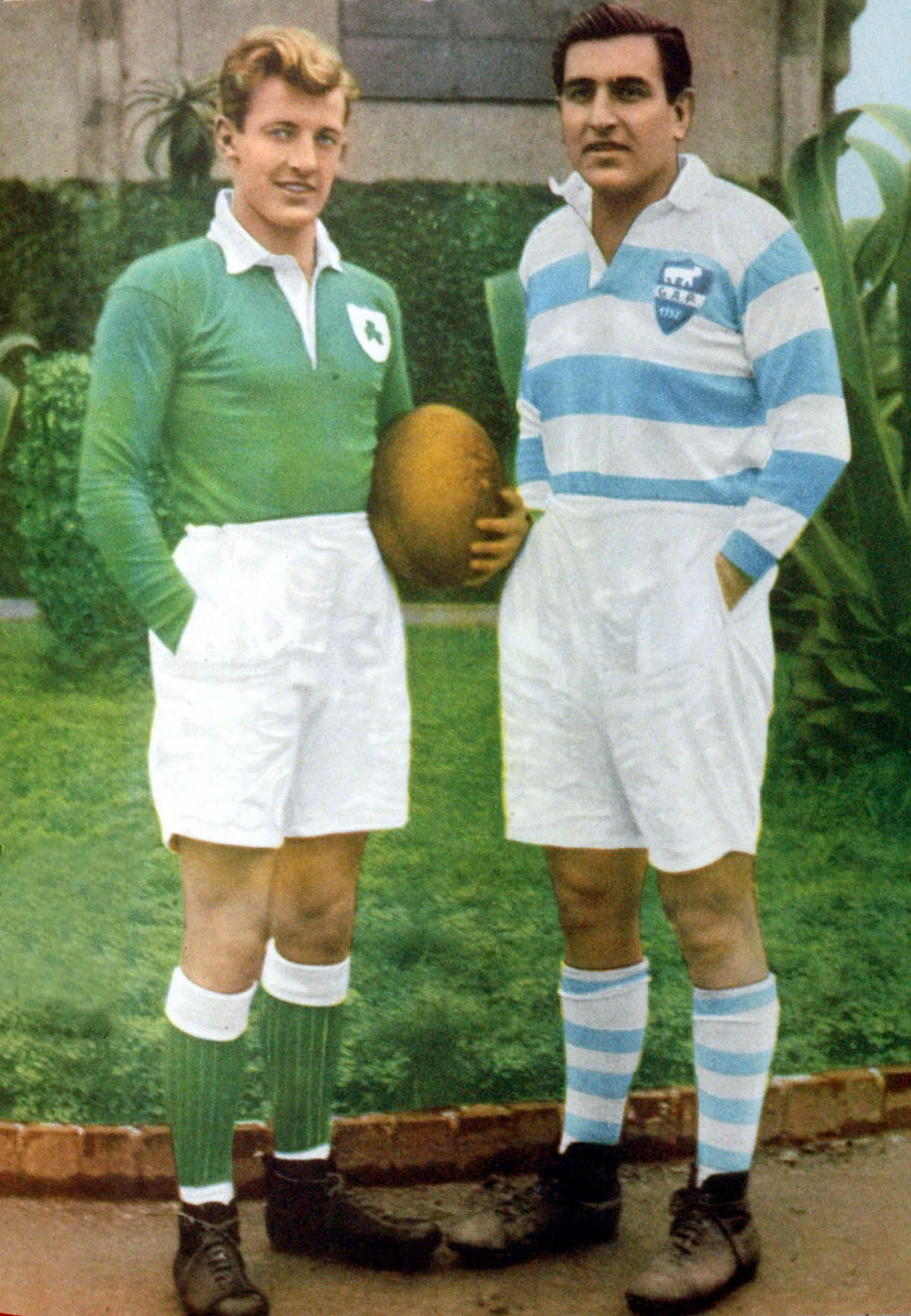
W.J. Hewitt (Ireland) and Miguel A. Sarandón (Argentina) during the tour to South America of 1952

In 1948, inspired by tactician and fly-half Jack Kyle, Ireland beat France in Paris, England at Twickenham and a 6–0 win over Scotland at Lansdowne Road. They clinched their first Grand Slam in the Five Nations with a win against Wales at Ravenhill, Belfast. Ireland were champions and Triple Crown winners again in 1949.

The Irish used only 19 players in clinching the 1949 Championship and Triple Crown, only the fourth time that the Triple Crown had been retained.

In 1951, Ireland were once more crowned outright Five Nations champions and were unbeaten going into their final game. They failed to win the Grand Slam or Triple Crown following a 3–3 draw with Wales in Cardiff.

The year of 1952 saw only Ireland's second overseas tour, the first for over half a century – as they headed to Argentina for a nine-match trip which included two Test matches. Ireland won six, drew two and lost one of the matches, their Test record being won one, drawn one.

On 27 February 1954, Ireland were due to play Scotland at Ravenhill in Belfast. The new Irish captain, Jim McCarthy, told IRFU president Sarsfield Hogan that the eleven Republic-based players would not stand for "God Save the Queen" alongside the Scottish team. It was agreed that an abbreviated anthem, known in Ulster as "the Salute", would be played that afternoon and that the Irish team would never play again at Ravenhill. Ireland went on to beat Scotland 6–0, but did not play in Northern Ireland again until 2007.

On 18 January 1958, Ireland beat Australia 9–6 in Dublin, marking the first time Ireland defeated a major touring team.

== Later 20th century: 1960–94 ==
Ireland managed just three victories in the Five Nations Championship; against England in 1961, Wales in 1963 and England again in 1964. There were also draws against England and Wales at Lansdowne Road to the end of 1964.

1965 saw an improvement as Ireland drew with France before beating England and Scotland, only for their Triple Crown hopes disappear against Wales in Cardiff. On 10 April 1965 Ireland recorded their first ever win over South Africa. The match, held at Lansdowne Road, was heading for a draw with the score at six points each, when Tom Kiernan won the match for Ireland with a late penalty. Ireland beat Australia again in Dublin in 1967 and became the first of the home nations to win in the Southern Hemisphere when they beat Australia in Sydney in May 1967.

On 26 October 1968, Ireland made it four successive wins over the Wallabies with a 16–3 win at Lansdowne Road.

In 1969, Ireland claimed a 17–9 victory over France at Lansdowne Road in the Five Nations, a first victory over Les Bleus in 11 years. They were again unbeaten going into their final game in Cardiff but Wales denied them a Grand Slam for the third time. In the autumn of 1969, the Irish Rugby Football Union decided to appoint a coach for the national team for the first time, the role went to Ronnie Dawson.

The 1972 Five Nations Championship was not completed when Scotland and then Wales refused to play in Ireland following threatening letters to players, purportedly from the IRA. The championship remained unresolved with Wales and Ireland unbeaten. In 1973, despite similar threats, England fulfilled their fixture and were given a standing ovation that lasted for five minutes. Ireland won 18–9 and at the after-match dinner the England captain, John Pullin famously remarked "We might not be very good but at least we turn up". Ireland came close to a first win over the All Blacks on 20 January 1973 but with the score at 10–10 an Irish conversion attempt was pushed wide by a gust of wind. In the final match of the 1974 season, Ireland won their first Five Nations Championship since 1951.

Roly Meates was national coach from 1975 to 1977 and Noel Murphy from 1977 to 1980. Willie John McBride was coach until 1984.

In 1982 Ireland came close to winning a Grand Slam but were beaten by France in Paris. They beat Scotland, Wales and England to win the championship and their first Triple Crown in 33 years.

Three years after their last Triple Crown win, Ireland, coached by Mick Doyle, came out in 1985 and won the Championship and the Triple Crown again. They beat Scotland and Wales. The French again prevented Ireland from claiming a Grand Slam after a 15–15 draw in Dublin. Ireland played England at Lansdowne Road and won the championship with a last minute drop goal from Michael Kiernan. The match ended 13–10 to Ireland. It was Ireland's last silverware until 2004.

Ireland were whitewashed in the 1986 Five Nations Championship but on 1 November 1986, Ireland made history when they scored 10 tries against Romania in a 60–0 win. It was the biggest win in international rugby at the time, equalling the French record set in 1967.

At the inaugural World Cup in 1987, two straightforward victories over Tonga and Canada were enough to see Ireland through to the quarter-finals, when they travelled to Sydney to face the joint hosts Australia, only to be beaten 33–15.

In the Five Nations, England and France were dominant throughout the decade, resulting in the others scrapping around for the odd Championship title. Ireland didn't manage to win the trophy once in the whole decade and worse never finished outside the bottom two. In 1991, they lost their test series against Namibia.

The second Rugby World Cup took place in Britain, Ireland and France in 1991. Ireland found themselves in the same pool as Scotland. After two easy wins over Japan and Zimbabwe, Scotland sneaked a 24–15 win at Murrayfield. Ireland played the Wallabies at Lansdowne Road in the quarter-final and appeared to be on the verge of a shock victory over Australia, when Michael Lynagh scored the winning try to clinch a 19–18 win for Australia.

At the 1994 Five Nations Championship, Ireland beat Will Carling's all-conquering England at Twickenham.

== Professional era begins: 1995–2005 ==
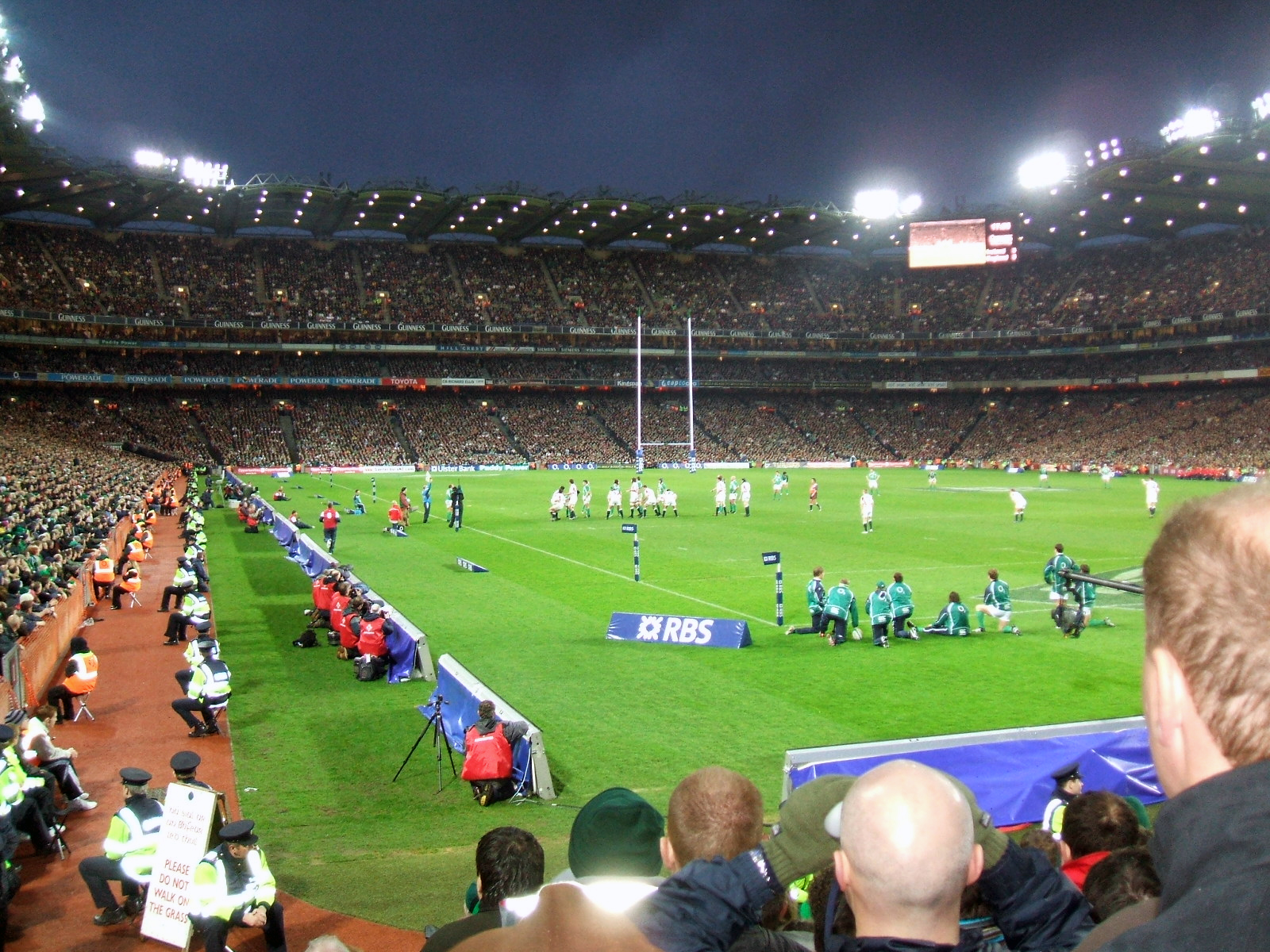
Ireland playing at Croke Park.

At the 1995 World Cup in South Africa, Ireland were in a group containing the All Blacks and Wales. In a close game in Johannesburg, Ireland went through 24–23 against Wales to make their third consecutive quarter-final appearance. Unfortunately, France proved too strong, with Ireland going down 36–12.

The start of the professional era was disappointing for Ireland who finished bottom in the Five Nations Championship three years in succession (1996, 1997 and 1998) and lost to Italy thrice, at home (29-37) and abroad (22-12 and 37-22). Englishman Brian Ashton was head coach between 1997 and 1998, but after a series of disappointing results resigned barely 12 months into the six-year contract he had been awarded by the IRFU. Warren Gatland took over as coach in 1998, but was unable to produce immediate success and 1999 was the first time Ireland failed to reach the last eight at a Rugby World Cup. The 1999 World Cup was staged in Wales though Ireland played all their pool games in Dublin. A defeat by the Wallabies in pool play meant Ireland having to go down the play-off route. Playing away from Lansdowne Road for the first time in the competition, Ireland were beaten 28–24 by Argentina in Lens. Statistically speaking, the 1990s was the worst decade in Irish Rugby, with the team achieving only 24 victories in 80 matches, with 10 of those wins coming against non-tier 1 sides.

From this nadir, however, Irish rugby improved rapidly. With the advent of professionalism, the Irish Rugby Football Union decided to convert the four representative provincial sides into de facto club sides, with the financial capacity to retain top talent in Ireland, yet retaining strong links with amateur clubs and schools to enable young talent to be brought up through the ranks. The close geographical proximity of most of the Irish international squad helped cement relationships between the players. The later formation in 2001 of the Celtic League (now called the Pro14) cemented this strategy by ensuring that provincial sides had a regular schedule of competitive rugby.

The advent of the new Six Nations format coincided with this Irish resurgence, and they became the strongest of the Celtic nations. In 2001 the rugby union season was disrupted due to the foot and mouth crisis in Britain. Ireland were good enough to beat France but were unable to play Scotland until the Autumn and were caught cold losing 32–10. They were still good enough to beat England, spoiling their hopes of a Grand Slam, and finishing second on points difference. Eddie O'Sullivan took over as coach from Warren Gatland in November 2001 following the New Zealander's sacking. Gatland's win percentage of 47.4% made him the most successful Irish coach since Ronnie Dawson in the early 1970s.

The 2003 Six Nations Championship came down to the wire with Ireland and England playing a Grand Slam decider at Lansdowne Road. England, however, won 42–6. That defeat ended an unbeaten run that stretched back 10 Tests to their Rugby World Cup qualifiers warm up against Romania in September 2002 and included defeats of Pool A rivals Australia and Argentina at Lansdowne Road. In 2004 they lost their opening game against France but became the first team to beat England following their World Cup win. They finished second in the table behind France and won the Triple Crown.

In 2005 Ireland were considered slight favourites entering the Six Nations Championships, and won their first three matches, including a 19–13 defeat of England in Dublin. However, Ireland's dreams of their first Grand Slam since 1948 were ended with a 26–19 home loss to France. In the final round, Wales defeated Ireland 32–20 at Millennium Stadium in Cardiff to win the Grand Slam. Ireland finished in 3rd place.

== 2006–2009 ==
In 2006, Ireland showed the capacity to play top class rugby, but only inconsistently – a rout of Wales was balanced by uncertain victories against England, Scotland and Italy and a comprehensive defeat by winners France. Ireland finished second and won the Triple Crown for the second time in three years, incidentally the first ever time a trophy had been awarded for the feat. They then embarked on their annual tour to the southern hemisphere. There they ran New Zealand close twice before a tired Ireland were thumped by the Wallabies in Perth. In the last Autumn Internationals at Lansdowne Road, Ireland beast he South African experimental side 32–15. Next were Australia, with Ireland posting a 21–6 victory to propel Ireland to a best ever height of 3rd in the IRB World Rankings. In the final international match at Lansdowne, Ireland thumped the Pacific Islanders 61–17.

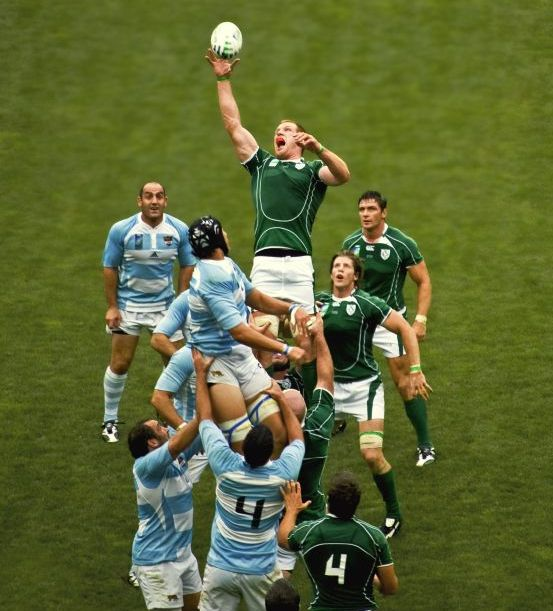
Paul O'Connell winning the line-out against Argentina in 2007.

In March 2007, the IRFU created the "High Performance Select Group" of up and coming Irish players who have been earmarked for future Irish teams. This group included Luke Fitzgerald, Tommy Bowe, Rob Kearney, Stephen Ferris, and Jamie Heaslip. The aim of the group is to provide young players with support and infrastructure and to ease their future transition into the Irish team. With the announcement of the rebuilding of Lansdowne Road, a new venue was required to stage Ireland's home internationals. The only stadium in Ireland capable of holding major rugby internationals was Croke Park, home of the Gaelic Athletic Association. To accommodate this, the GAA temporarily relaxed its rule governing the playing of so-called "foreign games" on its property. Initially, two Six Nations games were played at Croke Park during 2007; the first was a 17–20 loss to France, and the second a 43 to 13 win over England.

Ireland began their 2008 Six Nations Campaign with a narrow win over Italy. France then edged Ireland out in Paris, before they went on to beat Scotland in Dublin, Ireland then lost to eventual Grand Slammers Wales and England. In March 2008, Eddie O'Sullivan resigned as Ireland coach after the disappointing Six Nations and World Cup campaigns. Declan Kidney was subsequently appointed as manager but did not take up this role formally until after Ireland's tour of New Zealand and Australia (losing to the All Blacks 21–11 and Australia 18–12). His first official game in charge was against Canada at Thomond Park which Ireland won 55–0.

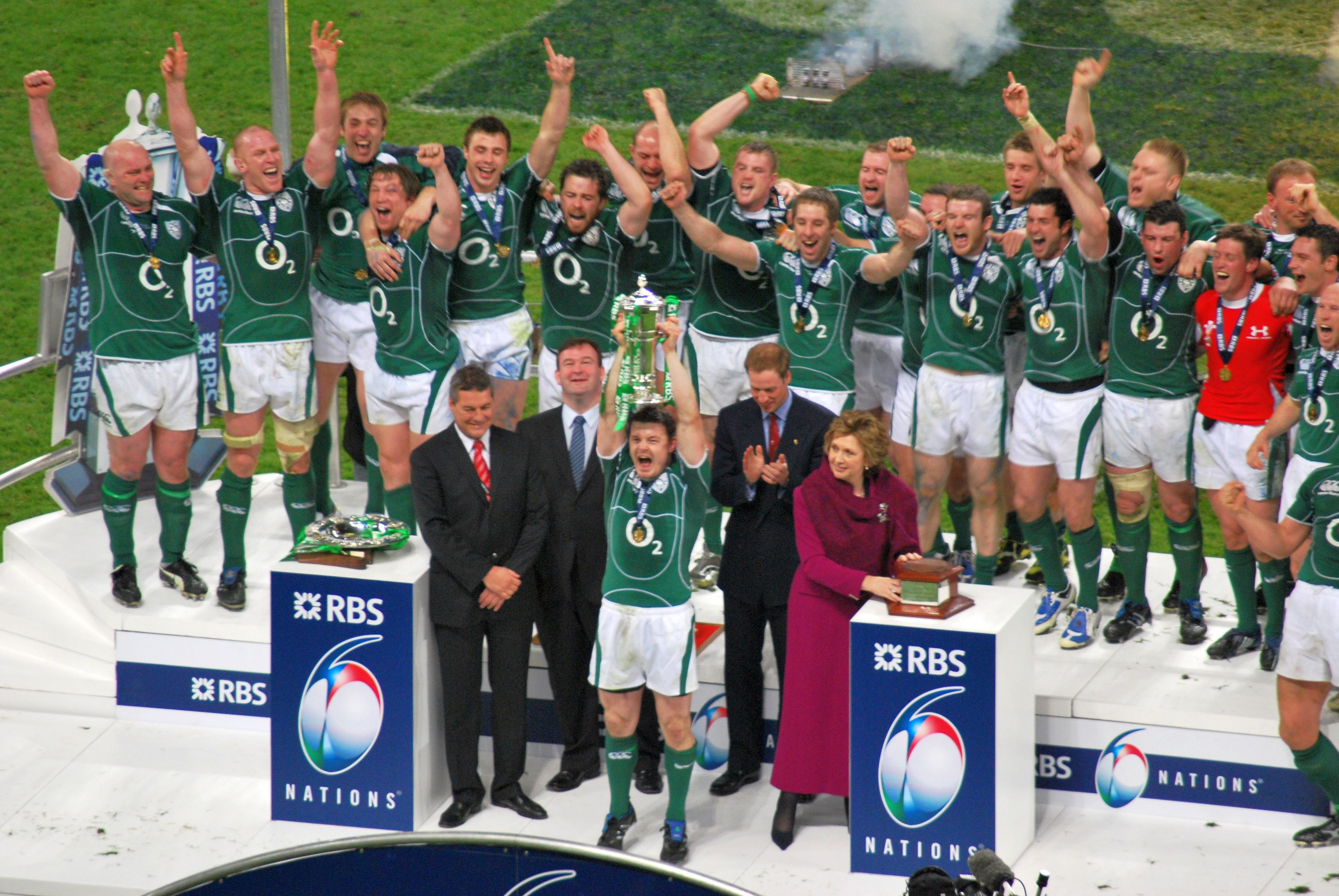
Brian O'Driscoll lifting the 2009 Six Nations Grand slam trophy.

Ireland won the 2009 Six Nations Championship and Grand Slam by beating Wales at the Millennium Stadium 15–17 on 21 March 2009, the decisive score coming from a dropped goal by Ronan O'Gara. It was the first time they had won the championship since 1985, and the first time they had won the Grand Slam since 1948. Ireland also became only the second team (after Wales in 2005) to win a Six Nations Grand Slam after playing more away games than at home. The Ireland team arrived home at Dublin Airport to a heroes welcome. Afterwards around 18,000 fans turned out at the Mansion House to greet the team after clinching their Grand Slam. After Autumn Series victories against Fiji and South Africa, and a draw against Australia, Ireland ended 2009 unbeaten.

== 2010–2013 ==
Ireland began the 2010 Six Nations with a home game against Italy, winning 29–11. Their second game was away to France with Ireland losing 33–10. Next Ireland were away to England. Ireland emerged victorious, a Tommy Bowe try and Ronan O'Gara conversion winning the match 16–20. Next Ireland were back at Croke Park against Wales. Ireland were winners, beating Wales 27–12 after a Man-of-the-Match performance from Tomás O'Leary. Ireland's final game of the Six Nations, and the last ever game at Croke Park, was against Scotland. Ireland went into the match with a 5th Triple Crown in sight, but lost to Scotland 20–23.

Ireland began their 2010 Summer Tests with a non-cap friendly against the Barbarians, which they lost 23–29. Their next game saw them take on New Zealand. Following an Jamie Heaslip red card with 15 minutes played, Ireland were thrashed 66–28, their heaviest ever defeat at the time. Ireland's next game was against New Zealand Maori. The side fielded many inexperienced players. The game was level at 18–18 at half-time, but the Maori won 31–28. Ireland's last game of the Summer Tests, was against Australia which they lost 22–15.

Ireland began their 2010 Autumn Tests with a 21–23 defeat by South Africa, the first international at the new Aviva Stadium. Ronan O'Gara won his 100th cap for Ireland during the game. Ireland's next game was against Samoa, which they won 20–10. Ireland's third game of the 2010 Autumn Tests was against New Zealand, which the All-Blacks won 18–38. Ireland's final game of the 2010 Autumn Tests was against Argentina, which Ireland won 29–9.

The 2011 Six Nations Championship began for Ireland against Italy in Rome, where a late Ronan O'Gara drop goal secured an 11–13 win for Ireland. Ireland lost 22–25 to France in their second match, the first Six Nations match to be played at the Aviva Stadium. Ireland next played Scotland at Murrayfield, defeating the Scots 18–21. Wales defeated Ireland 19–13 at the Millennium Stadium. During the game, Ronan O'Gara became the first Irishman, and only the fifth player, to cross the 1,000-point barrier in international rugby, and Brian O'Driscoll equalled the Four/Five/Six Nations all-time record for tries scored. Ireland's final game was against England, who were chasing their first Grand Slam in eight years. Ireland won 24–8 to ruin England's hopes, Brian O'Driscoll scored his 25th Championship try to set a new record, and Ronan O'Gara made his 56th Championship appearance to equal the record of countryman Mike Gibson.

Ireland's 2012 Six Nations Championship campaign began with 21–23 defeat at the hands of Wales. Ireland's second game, away to France, was called off due to a frozen pitch. Ireland beat Italy 42–10 in their second fixture of the 2012 Six Nations. Ireland's third game was the re-arranged fixture against France at the Stade de France, which was drawn 17–17. Ireland beat Scotland 32–14 in their Round 4 game. Ireland's final 2012 Six Nations game was away to England, which the hosts won 30–9, meaning Ireland finished third overall with two wins, one draw and two defeats.

Ireland began their three-test 2012 summer tour of New Zealand with a 42–10 defeat. Ireland narrowly lost the second test after a 79th minute Dan Carter drop-goal secured a 22–19 win for New Zealand. New Zealand won the third test 60–0, securing a 3–0 series victory and inflicting upon Ireland their heaviest ever defeat.

Ireland opened their 2012 November tests with a 12–16 defeat at the hands of South Africa. Ireland's second game of the series was an uncapped friendly against Fiji, which the Irish XV won 53–0. Ireland beat Argentina 46–24 in the third and final 2012 November test, securing a place in the IRB Rankings top 8.

The 2013 Six Nations Championship began for Ireland with a trip to Wales, where Ireland won 22–30, their first win against Wales since 2010. Ireland lost their second game, at home to England, 6-12, the first time they have lost at home to England in 10 years. Scotland beat Ireland 12–8 in Round 3 of the tournament. Ireland drew 13–13 with France in Round 4, the second consecutive draw between the sides. Ireland went into their final game of the tournament, against Italy. Italy won the game 22–15, their first win over Ireland in the Six Nations, but France ended up with the Wooden Spoon because Ireland had a better points-difference.

The IRFU decided not to extend Declan Kidney's contract in the wake of the defeat, meaning Les Kiss would take over as Interim head coach for the North America Tour in June 2013.

== Joe Schmidt Era (2013–2019) ==
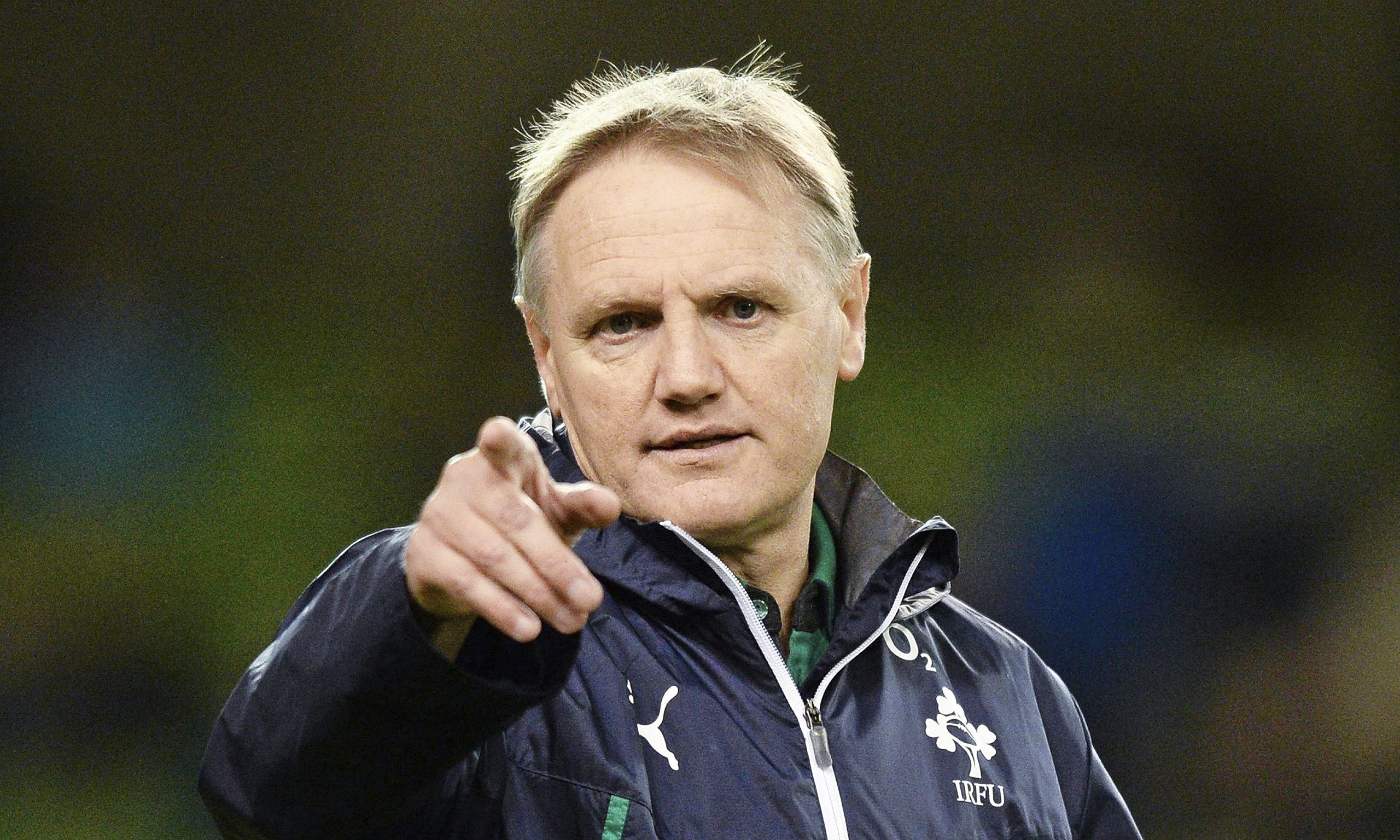
Joe Schmidt coaching the Irish team

Leinster's Joe Schmidt was announced as the new permanent Ireland team coach on 29 April 2013. His contract started on 1 July 2013, after Ireland's tour of North America, which was led by Les Kiss. Ireland went to North America for their 2013 Summer Tour, beating the USA 12–15 on 8 June 2013 before beating Canada 14–40 on 15 June 2013.

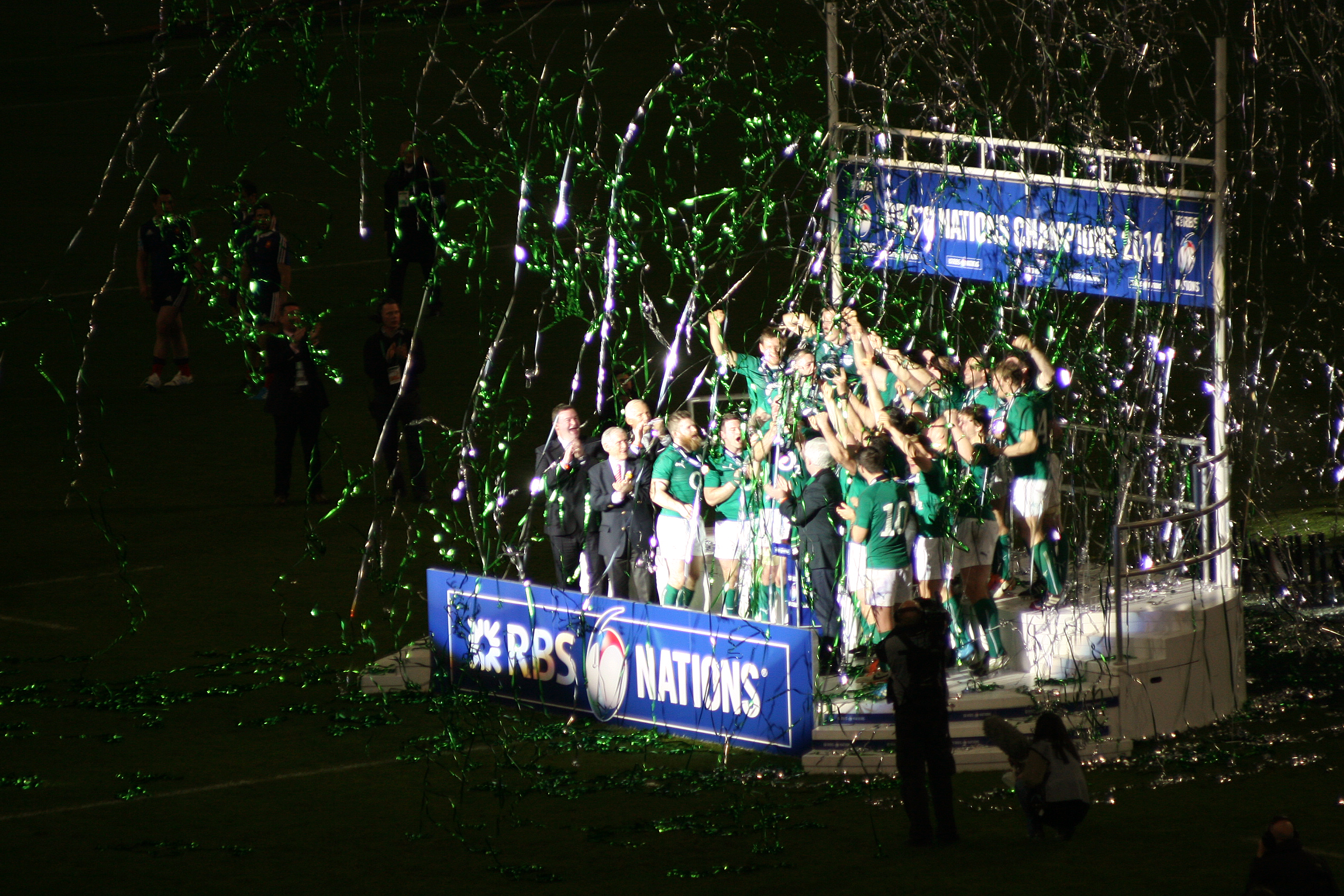
Ireland celebrate winning the 2014 Six Nations Championship.

Ireland opened their 2013 end-of-year rugby union tests with a 40–9 win against Samoa. Ireland lost 15–32 to Australia in the second game of the series on 16 November 2013. Ireland lost 22–24 to New Zealand in their final game of 2013 on 24 November 2013, having led almost throughout the match only to be denied by a late converted try.

Ireland opened their 2014 Six Nations Championship with a 28–6 win over Scotland on 2 February 2014. In their second game, Ireland beat Wales 26–3. Ireland lost 10–13 to England on 22 February 2014. Ireland won their next match against Italy 46–7. Ireland beat France 22–20 in the final round to claim the Six Nations title on points difference. In June 2014 they won over Argentina 29–17 at Resistencia and 23–17 at Tucumán. In November they defeated Georgia 49–7, South Africa 29–15 and Australia 26–23 in Dublin to move to third in the World Rugby Rankings.

On 1 March 2015, Ireland won their tenth test match in a row after a 19–9 win against England in the 2015 Six Nations Championship, equalling an Irish record set in 2003. Despite a 23–16 loss to Wales at the Millennium Stadium, Ireland retained the Six Nations Championship on 21 March 2015 with a 10–40 win over Scotland. In the first match of the final round, Wales thrashed Italy 20–61, putting the Welsh on top of the table by points difference with 53, which meant that Ireland had to win by at least 20 points to retain the Championship. Their 30-point win put them top of the standings, leaving England's only chance of snatching the title to beat France by 26 points. However, they fell six points short, and Ireland became Six Nations Champions for the second year running on points difference. In late May Ireland lost to Barbarian F.C. by one point at Limerick.

Ireland opened their 2015 Rugby World Cup campaign on 19 September with a 50–7 win against Canada, and followed that up a week later with a 44–10 win against Romania at Wembley Stadium. In their third match of the World Cup they faced Italy, and won the game 16–9 to book their place in the quarter-finals. In their final match of the World Cup pool stage they faced France, and won the game 24–9 to top pool D. On 18 October 2015, Ireland lost by 43–20 to Argentina in the Quarter-finals.

Entering the 2016 Six Nations competition with a squad depleted by injury, Ireland won only two matches in the tournament (58–15 against Italy in Round 4, and 35–25 against Scotland in Round 5), and only achieved a 16–16 draw against Wales. The team went on to win the first of their three-match tour of South Africa 26–20, before losing the second and third tests 26–32 and 13–19. In autumn of the same year, Ireland defeated the New Zealand All Blacks for the first time ever on 5 November 2016 in Chicago by 40–29. This was New Zealand's only loss all year, and ended their record-breaking win streak of 18 test matches. Despite New Zealand winning the return fixture in Dublin the following week 21–9, Ireland moved up to fourth in the world rankings.

Ireland placed second in the 2017 Six Nations Championship, behind defending champions England, who the Irish defeated in the final of round of the competition by 13–9, ending England's record-equalling run of 18 victories since 2015. However, they lost to Scotland 22–27 in Round 1 and Wales 9–22 in Round 4 during the same tournament. With many first-choice players selected to tour with the British & Irish Lions, Ireland took a development squad into their summer games that year, which included a 55–19 win over the USA, and a 2–0 test series victory against Japan. In November 2017, Ireland moved to third in the world rankings following their biggest-ever win over South Africa, 38–3, and victories over Fiji and Argentina.

After winning the 2018 Six Nations Championship with a Grand Slam, Ireland moved up to second in the world rankings. A 2–1 series win over Australia in summer that year was followed by a second victory in two years against the world number one All Blacks, by 16–9 which cemented Ireland's number two ranking and most accumulated rating points (91.17) in their history. Following their success in the Six Nations, the Australia tour and the autumn internationals, Ireland were named 2018 World Rugby Team of the Year with Joe Schmidt claiming World Rugby Coach of the Year.

The 2019 Six Nations started with a defeat to England, by 20–32. After this, they beat Scotland, Italy and France, but the competition concluded with a loss against Grand Slam winners Wales which ended 7–25. The Welsh led the Irish by 25–0 going into overtime, until a last-gasp try from replacement half-back Jordan Larmour. However, Ireland achieved some redress when they defeated Wales back-to-back, home and away, in the 2019 Rugby World Cup warm-up matches and subsequently reached number 1 in the World Rugby Rankings for the first time in their history, which they retained going in to the 2019 Rugby World Cup.

The 2019 Rugby World Cup ended in disappointment for the Irish, who opened their campaign with a rousing 27–3 win over Scotland, but were felled the following round in a shock 12–19 defeat to tournament hosts Japan. Ireland overcame their other pool opponents Russia (35–0) and Samoa (47–5) to reach the quarter-finals, but were knocked out by New Zealand 46–14. The loss to the All Blacks represented Ireland´s seventh exit at the quarter-finals of a World Cup, having never reached a semi-final, and saw their place in the world rankings fall from 1st going into the tournament to 5th by its conclusion.

== Andy Farrell Era (2020–present) ==
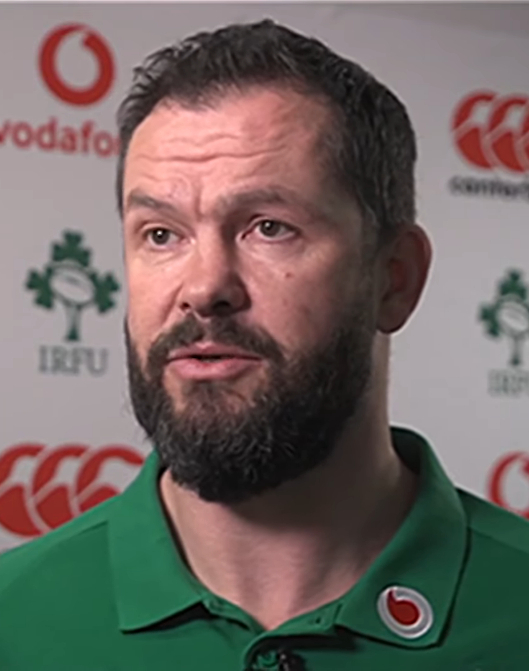
Andy Farrell at a 2020 press conference

2020 saw Ireland´s first Six Nations campaign under former defense coach Andy Farrell, who replaced Joe Schmidt after the World Cup, interrupted by the COVID-19 pandemic. Prior to the disruption, Ireland notched wins against Scotland (19–12) and Wales (24–14) before losing against England 12–24. Ireland´s fourth round game against Italy was delayed until October that year, with the Irish recording a 50–17 win, going on to a 27–35 defeat against France to finish the truncated tournament in 3rd place. In the subsequent Autumn Nations Cup, Ireland again defeated Wales (32–9) and Scotland (31–16) but were beaten once again by England, 7–18. Their performance in the game against Georgia, although a comfortable win on the scoreboard (23–10) was criticized for a perceived lack of spirit or tactical ingenuity. Ireland finished 2020 with their ranking unchanged, at 5th in the world.

The 2021 Six Nations took place again amidst the ongoing pandemic, with spectators still excluded. In this changed environment Ireland would have an indifferent campaign, once again finishing 3rd with wins over Italy (48–10), Scotland (27–24) and England (32–18), after losing their opening two matches to France (13–15) and eventual champions Wales (16–21). Ireland played most of the game against Wales down to 14 men after veteran flanker Peter O'Mahony became the first Irish player to be red carded in a Six Nations match, for a foul on Wynn Jones in the 14th minute. Ireland achieved two victories in the 2021 July tests against Japan (39–31) and the United States (71–10). Ireland finished the season with an 8–2 record, following a clean sweep in the Autumn Nations series, defeating Japan (60–5), New Zealand (29–20) and Argentina (53–7).

Ireland opened their 2022 Six Nations campaign with an emphatic 29–7 victory over Wales, only to lose to France 30–24 the next week at the Stade De France. They then defeated an ill-disciplined Italy in Dublin 57–6 and got their biggest win over England at Twickenham since 1964 (15–32). On the final day of the tournament, Ireland had to win against Scotland and France had to lose against England in order for Ireland to win the Championship. Ireland won the Triple Crown on the final day of the tournament, beating Scotland 26–5 in Dublin, but failed to win the Championship after France beat England 25–13 in Saint-Denis.

After losing the opening test match of the 2022 New Zealand tour, Ireland scored their first victory against the All Blacks on New Zealand soil on 9 July 2022, their fourth win over New Zealand. Three days later, they followed up their historic win with their first victory over the Maori All Blacks in four attempts, beating the side 24–30 in Wellington. On 16 July 2022 Ireland became just the fifth touring side and first in the professional era to achieve a series win in New Zealand, beating the All Blacks 22–32 in Wellington for a 2–1 series victory. Following that victory Ireland officially became the world number one team for the second time in their history.

Ireland followed up their successful New Zealand tour with three wins over South Africa, Fiji and Australia. Their victory over Australia was their 12th successive home win and completed a clean sweep of successes over the southern hemisphere's big three in a calendar year. On 18 March 2023, Ireland won the Grand Slam for the fourth time in a 29–16 victory over England in Dublin. This marked the first time in which Ireland won the Grand Slam in Dublin and the second time in which they won it on Irish soil, with the first occurring Belfast in the 1948 Championship.

In September 2023, Ireland opened their 2023 Rugby World Cup campaign with their biggest ever win at a Rugby World Cup beating Romania 82–8. Ireland subsequently won their group matches against eventual champions South Africa 13–8 and against Scotland 36–14 at Stade de France. Despite their group stage success, Ireland still could not overcome the quarter-final hurdle, losing 24–28 to New Zealand. This loss also ended the side's 17 consecutive Test victories, an Irish record.

Ireland's 31–7 victory over Wales in the 2024 Six Nations tied England's record for the most consecutive Six Nations victories at 11 and also extended Ireland's longest run of home wins to 18. Ireland beat Scotland on 16 March 2024, to become back-to-back Six Nations outright champions for only the third time in history, emulating the class of 1949 and 2015.

On 13 July 2024, Ireland defeated World Champions South Africa (24–25) with a last minute drop goal from Ciarán Frawley in Kings Park, Durban earning a series draw, 1-1. Following this victory Ireland regained the Raeburn Shield which they had surrendered to New Zealand after their 2023 World Cup quarter-final defeat.

On 30 November 2024, Ireland concluded their 2024 Autumn Nations Series with a 22–19 over Australia, coached by former Ireland head coach Joe Schmidt. Though Schmidt had previously coached against Ireland as an assistant with New Zealand at the 2023 Rugby World Cup, this was the first time they had faced a Schmidt-coached side in Ireland. This match marked the 150th anniversary of the IRFU and Ireland wore an anniversary kit for the fixture. In addition, Cian Healy became Ireland's all-time leading appearance maker overtaking Brian O'Driscoll to make his 134th appearance. It was also the final game Andy Farrell would take charge of before his sabbatical to coach the British & Irish Lions for the 2025 tour of Australia. Assistant coach Simon Easterby would assume the head coach duties for the 2025 Six Nations and summer tour in his absence.

Ireland finished third in the 2025 Six Nations under Simon Easterby, despite winning four matches, only losing at home to France, 27–42. It was announced after the campaign that Paul O'Connell would take over as interim head coach from Simon Easterby who would be coaching with the British & Irish Lions. The first British and Irish Lions test against Australia featured a record eight Irish players in the starting 15 and 11 in the matchday 23. During Ireland's 2025 summer tour they beat Portugal 7–106, breaking Ireland's record for tries in a match and largest winning margin, which was previously their 3–83 win over the United States. They achieved this despite 17 of their players on tour with the British and Irish Lions. During the match Jack Crowley also broke the Irish record for most conversions in a single match with twelve.
