= Rugby Championship =

Rugby Championship may refer to:

== Men's international ==
- The Rugby Championship, an annual international rugby union competition organised by SANZAAR for teams in the southern hemisphere
- Americas Rugby Championship, an international rugby union competition organised by the IRB for teams in North and South America
- South American Rugby Championship, an annual international rugby union competition for teams in South America
- Regional Rugby Championship, an annual international club rugby union featuring some European sides
- United Rugby Championship, an annual international club rugby union featuring some European and South African sides
- Asian Rugby Championship, an annual international rugby union competition for teams in Asia

== Women's international ==
- NACRA Women's Rugby Championship, an international women's rugby union competition for teams in the Caribbean
- Caribbean Women's Rugby Championship, a former international women's rugby union competition organised by the IRB for teams in the Caribbean
- ARFU Women's Rugby Championship, an international women's rugby union competition for teams in Asia

== Domestic ==
- Australian Rugby Championship, a former domestic rugby union competition in Australia
- Canadian Rugby Championship, an annual domestic rugby union competition in Canada
- RFU Championship, a second tier of professional rugby union in England
- Rugby Championship of Yugoslavia, an annual domestic rugby union competition in the former Yugoslavia
- Norway Rugby Championship, an annual domestic rugby union competition in Norway
- All Japan University Rugby Championship, an annual domestic rugby union competition involving Japanese universities
- Rugby Championship of Serbia, an annual domestic rugby union competition in Serbia
- Rugby Championship of Czechoslovakia, an annual domestic rugby union competition in the former Czechoslovakia
- Campeonato Brasileiro de Rugby, an annual domestic rugby union competition in Brazil

== Wheelchair ==
- World Wheelchair Rugby Championships, an international wheelchair rugby competition organised by the IWRF
