= Utrecht Shield =

Women's rugby union lineal title

- Sport: Rugby Union
- Awarded for: Lineal Championship

History
- First award: 13 June 1982; 44 years, 144 days ago
- First winner: France
- Most recent: Canada 16 Oct 2026; 19 days ago
- Website: raeburnandutrechtshields.com

The Utrecht Shield is an unofficial rugby union lineal championship contested in international women's rugby union. The title follows a "title holder" system - similar to a boxing world title or New Zealand’s Ranfurly Shield, where the holder of the Shield defends it in each subsequent international match they play. If the holder loses, the winning team becomes the new holder.

Named after the city of Utrecht, where the first women's rugby union test match, between the Netherlands and France, took place on 13 June 1982, the Shield celebrates the roots of the Women’s international game. France's victory in that match is treated as the first championship win, and the title is considered to have passed between national teams through successive Test matches since then.

The Utrecht Shield is not an official competition organised by World Rugby, but rather a statistical and historical concept used by rugby historians and fans to track a continuous lineal champion. A men's version of the trophy, the Raeburn Shield, follows the same format. Both of these shields have been highlighted by RugbyPass, owned by World Rugby.

Canada are the current holders after beating England in the WXV on October 16, 2026.

== Concept ==
The Utrecht Shield operates on a lineal championship system. The team holding the shield defends it in every international Test match they play. If the holder wins or draws the match, they retain the shield. If the holder loses, the opposing team becomes the new holder.

Because the title does not belong to a tournament; instead, it is held by the team that most recently it and changes hands only when the current holder is defeated, it can be won outside of major tournaments and may change hands during any international fixture, adding an extra layer of excitement to every match they play. This format has led to the shield occasionally being held by teams that have not won major competitions.

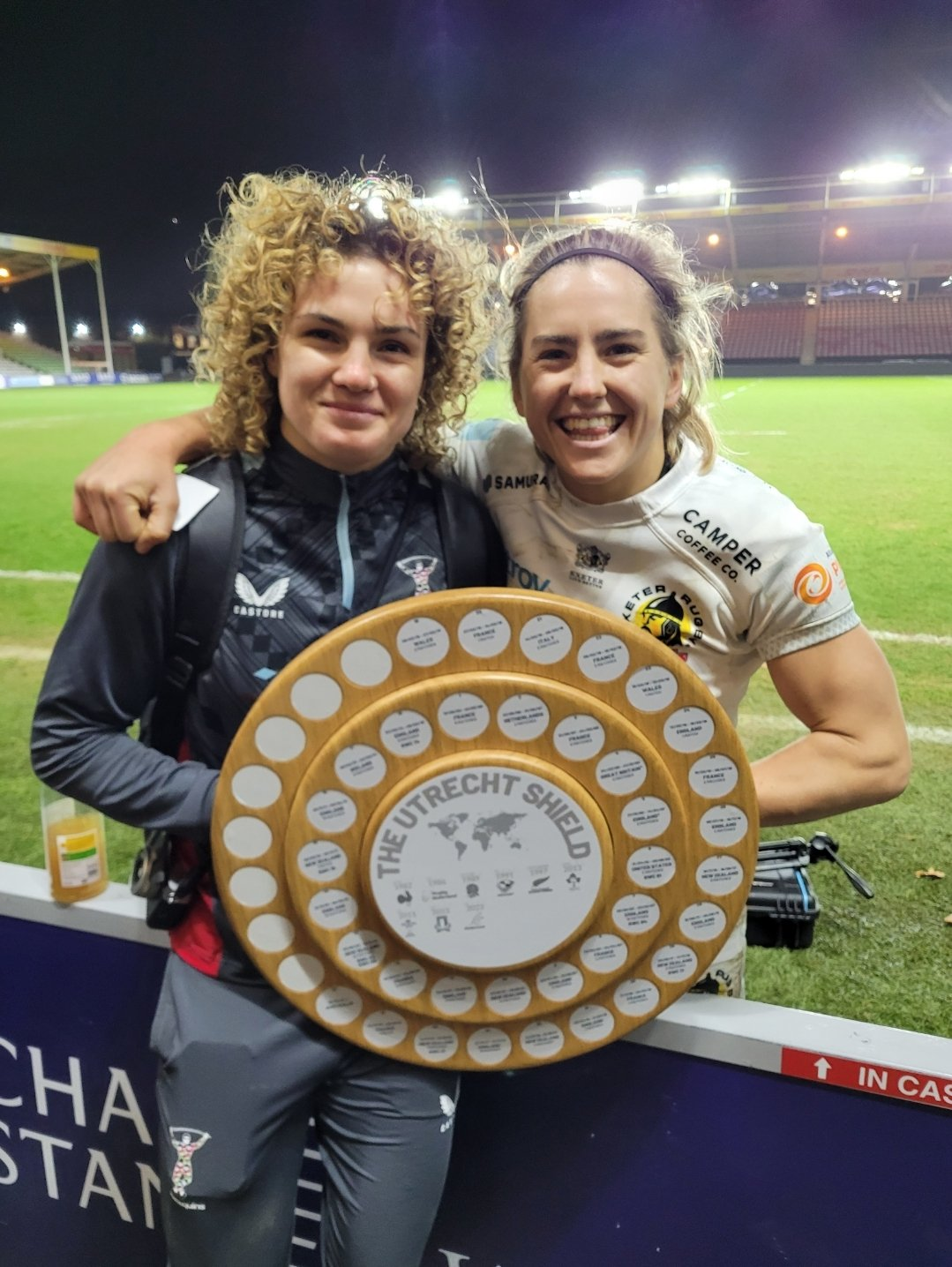
Red Roses players, Ellie Kildunne (left) and Claudia Moloney-MacDonald (right) with the Utrecht Shield

== History ==
The concept of a lineal championship in women's rugby was first conceived by New Zealander and former Harbour Hawks tighthead prop; David Algie in 2008. The concept emerged from discussion on an online rugby forum, where Algie and others suggested applying a "winner-stays-on" championship model to Test rugby results.

Since its creation, the Utrecht Shield has been a fan-driven title maintained and promoted by supporters rather than official rugby governing bodies, and shield challenges have become part of match reports by major news outlets, such as the BBC.

The physical shield was fabricated by an Edinburgh-based woodworker and ex-Watsonian Women head coach Freddie Main.

The Utrecht Shield's lineage begins with the first women's rugby union test match played between the Netherlands and France on 13 June 1982. The match was arranged as part of the 50th anniversary of the Dutch Rugby Union celebrations, when the Dutch invited the then French women's rugby governing body, the Association Française de Rugby Féminin (AFRF), to send a women's national team to play against the Dutch women's national team. The match was covered by reporter Henk Hansen of the Dutch news magazine Panorama. France won against the Netherlands in that first match 4-0. At a match between the two teams at Enschede on 1 May 1986, France were defeated 10–0, ending the first Utrecht Shield run.

== List of shield holders ==
List of every successful challenge
Match	Defender	Score	Challenger	Date	SD	Tenure
1	Netherlands	0-4	France	13 June 1982	-	-
2	France	0-10	Netherlands	1 May 1986	3	1418d (3y10m18d)
3	Netherlands	3-22	France	31 May 1987	1	395d (1y30d)
4	France	0-13	Great Britain (Note: Great Britain was disbanded during the reign and replaced by England, Scotland, and Wales. England was assigned the trophy.)	4 March 1989	4	643d (1y9m4d)
5	England	6-19	United States	14 April 1991	6	771d (2y1m10d)
6	United States	6-17	England	8 June 1993	1	786d (2y1m25d)
7	England	15-17	France	23 February 1997	17	1356d (3y8m15d)
8	France	10-15	England	4 April 1997	1	40d (1m12d)
9	England	0-67	New Zealand	13 August 1997	1	131d (4m9d)
10	New Zealand	17-22	England	16 June 2001	13	1403d (3y10m3d)
11	England	17-22	France	1 March 2002	2	258d (8m13d)
12	France	0-30	New Zealand	21 May 2002	4	81d (2m20d)
13	New Zealand	3-10	England	21 November 2009	19	2741d (7y6m)
14	England	10-13	New Zealand	5 September 2010	9	288d (9m15d)
15	New Zealand	0-10	England	26 November 2011	0	447d (1y2m21d)
16	England	0-25	Ireland	9 February 2013	15	441d (1y2m14d)
17	Ireland	10-17	England	22 February 2014	5	378d (1y13d)
18	England	0-13	Wales	8 February 2015	8	351d (11m17d)
19	Wales	7-28	France	27 February 2015	1	19d
20	France	12-17	Italy	14 March 2015	0	15d
21	Italy	0-39	France	6 February 2016	1	329d (10m23d)
22	France	8-10	Wales	28 February 2016	1	22d
23	Wales	13-20	England	12 March 2016	0	13d
24	England	12-17	France	18 March 2016	0	6d
25	France	13-17	England	5 July 2016	1	109d (3m17d)
26	England	20-25	New Zealand	19 November 2016	3	137d (4m14d)
27	New Zealand	21-29	England	17 June 2017	4	210d (6m29d)
28	England	32-41	New Zealand	26 August 2017	4	70d (2m9d)
29	New Zealand	27-30	France	17 November 2018	4	448d (1y2m22d)
30	France	26-41	England	10 February 2019	1	85d (2m24d)
31	England	13-28	New Zealand	14 July 2019	6	154d (5m4d)
32	New Zealand	12-43	England	31 October 2021	2	840d (2y3m17d)
33	England	31-34	New Zealand	12 November 2022	16	377d (1y12d)
34	New Zealand	17-18	France	21 October 2023	4	343d (11m9d)
35	France	20-29	Australia	28 October 2023	0	7d
36	Australia	14-33^{[33]}	Canada	11 May 2024	1	196d (6m13d)
37	Canada	12-21^{[34]}	England	12 October 2024	3	154d (5m1d)
38	England	21-24	Canada	16 October 2026	21	734d (2y4d)
39	Canada			Ongoing	1 (as of 23 October 2026)	Ongoing

== Most shield defences ==
Most shield defences by each team
	Team	Total	Chal.	Cons.
1	England	108	13	21
2	New Zealand	46	7	19
3	France	15	9	4
4	Ireland	5	1	5
5	Canada	4	2	3
6	Wales	1	2	1
7	Italy	1	1	1
7	Netherlands	1	1	1
7	United States	1	1	1
7	Australia	1	1	1

- Total: Times a team kept hold of the shield.
- Chal.: Times a team took hold of the shield from another team.
- Cons.: Maximum length of consecutive shield defences.

As at 24 October 2026

Highest consecutive shield defences
No.	Team	Start	Def.	Score	End	Score	Chal.	Tenure
21	England	12 October 2024	Canada	12-21^{[34]}	16 October 2026	21-24	Canada	734d (2y4d)
19	New Zealand	21 May 2002	France	0-30	21 November 2009	3-10	England	2741d (7y6m)
17	England	8 June 1993	United States	6-17	23 February 1997	15-17	France	1356d (3y8m15d)
16	England	31 October 2021	New Zealand	12-43	12 November 2022	31-34	New Zealand	377d (1y12d)
15	England	26 November 2011	New Zealand	0-10	9 February 2013	0-25	Ireland	441d (1y2m14d)
13	New Zealand	13 August 1997	England	0-67	16 June 2001	17-22	England	1403d (3y10m3d)

As at 24 October 2026

== See also ==
- Raeburn Shield, the men's version of the trophy
- List of rugby union competitions
