= Cape Fear Sevens =

North American rugby sevens tournament

The Cape Fear Sevens is a North American rugby sevens (the seven a side version of rugby union) tournament held the first weekend in July every year in North Carolina. Cape Fear 7's is one of the nation's largest Summer 7's tournaments and features one of the most competitive premiere divisions hosting teams from across the country and around the world year in and year out. It has been won by English teams Bristol, Harlequins and Bedford in 1984, 1986 and 1991.

== Results ==
- 2012 USA Rugby South Invitational
- 2011 Pacific Island Barbarians
- 2010 Pacific Islanders MD
- 2009 Life University Marietta, GA
- 2008 NOVA Arlington, VA
- 2006 England U. England
- 2005 OMBAC San Diego, CA
- 2004 Widgets MARFU Invitational
- 2003 Charlotte Charlotte, NC
- 2002 NOVA Arlington, VA
- 2001 NOVA Arlington, VA
- 2000 NOVA Arlington, VA
- 1999 NOVA Arlington, VA
- 1998 NOVA Arlington, VA
- 1997 NOVA Arlington, VA
- 1996 Atlantis Invitational
- 1995 NOVA Arlington, VA
- 1994 Atlantis Invitational
- 1993 Old Blue New York, NY
- 1992 Washington Washington, DC
- 1991 Bedford Bedford, England
- 1990 Washington Washington, DC
- 1989 Maryland Old Boys Maryland
- 1988 Duck Brothers Arlington, VA
- 1987 Duck Brothers Arlington, VA
- 1986 Harlequins London, England
- 1985 Duck Brothers Arlington, VA
- 1984 Bristol Bristol, England
- 1983 Duck Brothers Arlington, VA
- 1982 Duck Brothers Arlington, VA
- 1981 Richmond Richmond, VA
- 1980 Norfolk Norfolk, VA
- 1979 Norfolk Norfolk, VA
- 1978 Roanoke Roanoke, VA
- 1977 Norfolk Norfolk, VA
- 1976 Roanoke Roanoke, VA
- 1975 Univ. of Virginia Charlottesville, VA

== See also ==
- Rugby union in the United States
