= WRU Division Six South East =

Welsh rugby union league

- Founded: 2009
- No. of teams: 10
- Country: Wales
- Level on pyramid: 7
- Website: www.wru.co.uk/21954.php

The Welsh Rugby Union Division Six South East (also called the SWALEC Division Six South East for sponsorship reasons) is a rugby union league in Wales first implemented for the 2009/10 season.

== Competition ==
There are 10 clubs in the WRU Division Six South East. During the course of a season (which lasts from September to May) each club plays the others twice, once at their home ground and once at the home ground of their opponents for a total of 18 games for each club, with a total of 90 games in each season. Teams receive four points for a win and two point for a draw, an additional bonus point is awarded to either team if they score four tries or more in a single match. No points are awarded for a loss though the losing team can gain a bonus point for finishing the match within seven points of the winning team. Teams are ranked by total points, then the number of tries scored and then points difference. At the end of each season, the club with the most points is crowned as champion. If points are equal the tries scored then points difference determines the winner.

=== Sponsorship ===
In 2008 the Welsh Rugby Union announced a new sponsorship deal for the club rugby leagues with SWALEC valued at £1 million (GBP). The initial three year sponsorship was extended at the end of the 2010/11 season, making SWALEC the league sponsors until 2015. The leagues sponsored are the WRU Divisions one through to seven.

- (2008-2015) SWALEC

== 2010/2011 Season ==
=== League teams ===
- Cwmcam RFC
- Caerleon RFC
- Crickhowell RFC
- Hafodyrynys RFC
- Hollybush RFC
- New Panteg RFC
- Rogerstone RFC
- St. Joseph's RFC
- St. Julians HSOB
- Whiteheads RFC

== 2009/2010 Season ==
=== League teams ===
- Abertridwr RFC
- Caerleon RFC
- Crickhowell RFC
- Hafodyrynys RFC
- Hollybush RFC
- New Panteg RFC
- Rogerstone RFC
- St. Joseph's RFC
- St. Julians HSOB
- Whiteheads RFC

=== League table ===
2009-2010 WRU Division Six South East League Table
Club	Played	Won	Drawn	Lost	Points for	Points against	Points difference	Tries For	Tries Against	Try Bonus	Losing Bonus	Points
Abertridwr RFC	0	0	0	0	0	0	0	0	0	0	0	0
Caerleon RFC	0	0	0	0	0	0	0	0	0	0	0	0
Crickhowell RFC	0	0	0	0	0	0	0	0	0	0	0	0
Hafodyrynys RFC	0	0	0	0	0	0	0	0	0	0	0	0
Hollybush RFC	0	0	0	0	0	0	0	0	0	0	0	0
New Panteg RFC	0	0	0	0	0	0	0	0	0	0	0	0
Rogerstone RFC	0	0	0	0	0	0	0	0	0	0	0	0
St. Josephs RFC	0	0	0	0	0	0	0	0	0	0	0	0
St. Julians HSOB	0	0	0	0	0	0	0	0	0	0	0	0
Whiteheads RFC	0	0	0	0	0	0	0	0	0	0	0	0
Correct as of 2009-01-07
