= Pakistan National Rugby Championship =

- Countries: Pakistan
- Champions: Pakistan Army
- Runners-up: Punjab Greens

The Pakistan National Rugby Championship is an annual domestic rugby competition played in Pakistan. It involves the country's six rugby-playing state departments as well as the six provincial unions. The Pakistan Army are the current holders, having won 24-10 against Punjab Greens in the final of the 2012 edition.

== Teams ==
- Balochistan
- FATA
- Higher Education Commission
- Islamabad RA
- Khyber Pakhtunkhwa
- Punjab
- Sindh
- Pakistan Army
- Pakistan Navy
- Pakistan Police
- Pakistan Railways
- Water and Power Development Authority (WAPDA)
