= Raeburn Shield =

Rugby trophy

- Raeburn Shield unofficial trophy
- Sport: Rugby Union
- Awarded for: Lineal Championship

History
- First award: 27 March 1871 (155 years, 240 days ago)
- First winner: Scotland
- Most wins: New Zealand (44)
- Most recent: Australia (1 day ago)
- Website: raeburnandutrechtshields.com

The Raeburn Shield is an unofficial rugby union lineal championship contested in international men's rugby union. The title follows a "title holder" system - similar to a boxing world title or New Zealand's Ranfurly Shield, where the holder of the Shield defends it in each subsequent international match they play. If the holder loses, the winning team becomes the new holder.

The title traces its lineage to the first international rugby union match played between Scotland and England at Raeburn Place in Edinburgh on 27 March 1871. Scotland's victory in that match is treated as the first championship win, and the title is considered to have passed between national teams through successive Test matches since then.

The Raeburn Shield is not an official competition organised by World Rugby, but rather a statistical and historical concept used by rugby historians and fans to track a continuous lineal champion. A women's version of the trophy, the Utrecht Shield, follows the same format.

As of 21 November 2026 Australia is the current holder following their victory over Wales in Cardiff.

== Concept ==
The Raeburn Shield operates on a lineal championship system. The team holding the shield defends it in every international Test match they play. If the holder wins or draws the match, they retain the shield. If the holder loses, the opposing team becomes the new holder.

Because the title changes hands only when the current holder is defeated, it can be won outside of major tournaments and may change hands during any international fixture. This format has led to the shield occasionally being held by teams that have not won major competitions.

== History ==
The concept of a lineal championship in rugby was first proposed by the shield's creator, David Algie, a New Zealand born rugby fan and creator of the Raeburn Shield, in 2008. The concept emerged from discussion on an online rugby forum, where Algie and others suggested applying a "winner-stays-on" championship model to Test rugby results. Since its creation, the Raeburn Shield has been a fan-driven title maintained and promoted by supporters rather than official rugby governing bodies, and it continues to gain recognition among international rugby enthusiasts.

The Raeburn Shield's lineage begins with the first international rugby union match, played between Scotland and England in Edinburgh on 27 March 1871. The match was arranged following a challenge published in Bell's Weekly on 8 December 1870, signed by the captains of five Scottish clubs, inviting a team "selected from the whole of England" to play a 20-a-side game under rugby rules. Scotland won the game by a goal and one try, with Angus Buchanan scoring the first international rugby try. In the return match at the Kennington Oval, London, in 1872, Scotland were defeated, ending the first Raeburn Shield run.

South Africa recorded the longest tenure in the shield's lineage, holding it from 4 September 1937 until 5 September 1953. The 5,845 day period spanned the Second World War, during which international Test rugby was interrupted. South Africa successfully defended the title 11 times before losing to Australia in 1953. South Africa were also the holders for the duration of WW1 as part of the second longest tenure of 5,376 days (from 1906 to 1921).

For a period of 35 years from inception, the shield was only held by countries from the British Isles until South Africa won it for the first time on 24 November 1906. The shield then proceeded to stay in the southern hemisphere, switching between South Africa, Australia and New Zealand for 58 years until France claimed it for the first time on 24 July 1965. These are the longest periods of time where the shield has stayed within each hemisphere respectively.

By virtue of the format the lineal and official world championships are unified every four years as every Rugby World Cup final thus far has also been a defence of the Raeburn Shield, with the winner either acquiring it in the final or during the tournament. England in 2003 are the only side to have begun the Rugby World Cup as lineal champions and successfully defended it through the tournament (i.e. the only tournament where the shield did not change hands).

== List of shield holders ==
As of 21 November 2026

Match	Defender	Score	Challenger	Date	SD	Tenure
1	England	0G–1G	Scotland	27 March 1871	–	–
2	Scotland	1G–2G	England	5 February 1872	0	315d (10m9d)
3	England	0G–1G	Scotland	5 March 1877	4	1855d (5y1m0d)
4	Scotland	1G–2G	England	28 February 1880	2	1090d (2y11m23d)
5	England	0G–0G(2T)	Scotland	4 March 1882	1	735d (2y0m4d)
6	Scotland	(1T)0G–0G(2T)	England	3 March 1883	0	364d (11m27d)
7	England	0G–2G	Ireland	5 February 1887	9	1435d (3y11m2d)
8	Ireland	0–2G	Scotland	19 February 1887	0	14d
9	Scotland	0–0G(1T)	Wales	4 February 1888	1	350d (11m16d)
10	Wales	0–2G	Ireland	3 March 1888	0	28d
11	Ireland	0–1G	Scotland	10 March 1888	0	7d
12	Scotland	0–6	England	1 March 1890	4	721d (1y11m19d)
13	England	3–9	Scotland	7 March 1891	3	371d (1y0m6d)
14	Scotland	0–5	England	5 March 1892	2	364d (11m27d)
15	England	11–12	Wales	7 January 1893	0	308d (10m2d)
16	Wales	3–24	England	6 January 1894	2	364d (11m30d)
17	England	5–7	Ireland	3 February 1894	0	28d
18	Ireland	3–6	England	2 February 1895	2	364d (11m30d)
19	England	3–6	Scotland	9 March 1895	0	35d (1m7d)
20	Scotland	0–6	Wales	25 January 1896	0	322d (10m16d)
21	Wales	4–8	Ireland	14 March 1896	0	49d (1m18d)
22	Ireland	3–8	Scotland	20 February 1897	1	343d (11m6d)
23	Scotland	3–12	England	13 March 1897	0	21d
24	England	6–9	Ireland	5 February 1898	0	329d (10m23d)
25	Ireland	0–8	Scotland	19 February 1898	0	14d
26	Scotland	3–9	Ireland	18 February 1899	1	364d (11m30d)
27	Ireland	4–15	England	3 February 1900	1	350d (11m16d)
28	England	0–13	Wales	5 January 1901	1	336d (11m2d)
29	Wales	8–18	Scotland	9 February 1901	0	35d (1m4d)
30	Scotland	5–14	Wales	1 February 1902	2	357d (11m23d)
31	Wales	0–6	Scotland	7 February 1903	2	371d (1y0m6d)
32	Scotland	3–21	Wales	6 February 1904	2	364d (11m30d)
33	Wales	12–14	Ireland	12 March 1904	0	35d (1m6d)
34	Ireland	3–10	Wales	11 March 1905	2	364d (11m27d)
35	Wales	6–11	Ireland	10 March 1906	3	364d (11m27d)
36	Ireland	12–15	South Africa	24 November 1906	0	259d (8m14d)
37	South Africa	5–13	New Zealand	13 August 1921	7^{1}	5376d (14y8m20d)^{2}
38	New Zealand	5–9	South Africa	27 August 1921	0	14d
39	South Africa	6–7	New Zealand	21 July 1928	2^{3}	2520d (6y10m24d)
40	New Zealand	6–11	South Africa	18 August 1928	0	28d
41	South Africa	5–13	New Zealand	1 September 1928	0	14d
42	New Zealand	8–9	Australia	6 July 1929	0	308d (10m5d)
43	Australia	13–20	New Zealand	12 September 1931	2^{4}	798d (2y2m6d)
44	New Zealand	17–22	Australia	2 July 1932	0	294d (9m20d)
45	Australia	3–21	New Zealand	16 July 1932	0	14d
46	New Zealand	11–25	Australia	11 August 1934	1	756d (2y0m26d)
47	Australia	6–11	New Zealand	5 September 1936	1	756d (2y0m25d)
48	New Zealand	6–13	South Africa	4 September 1937	2	364d (11m30d)
49	South Africa	14–18	Australia	5 September 1953	11^{5}	5845d (16y0m1d)^{6}
50	Australia	8–18	South Africa	19 September 1953	0	14d
51	South Africa	6–10	New Zealand	14 July 1956	3^{7}	1029d (2y9m25d)
52	New Zealand	3–8	South Africa	4 August 1956	0	21d
53	South Africa	10–17	New Zealand	18 August 1956	0	14d
54	New Zealand	3–6	Australia	6 September 1958	4	749d (2y0m19d)
55	Australia	8–17	New Zealand	20 September 1958	0	14d
56	New Zealand	0–13	South Africa	25 June 1960	0^{8}	644d (1y9m5d)
57	South Africa	3–11	New Zealand	23 July 1960	0	28d
58	New Zealand	3–8	South Africa	27 August 1960	1	35d (1m4d)
59	South Africa	5–9	Australia	10 August 1963	9^{9}	1078d (2y11m14d)
60	Australia	6–22	South Africa	7 September 1963	1	28d
61	South Africa	6–8	France	25 July 1964	1	322d (10m18d)
62	France	6–9	England	27 February 1965	4	217d (7m2d)
63	England	6–11	Wales	15 January 1966	1	312d (10m9d)
64	Wales	6–9	Ireland	12 March 1966	1	66d (2m7d)
65	Ireland	3–8	England	11 February 1967	1	336d (10m30d)
66	England	12–16	France	25 February 1967	0	14d
67	France	3–26	South Africa	15 July 1967	1	140d (4m20d)
68	South Africa	14–19	France	29 July 1967	1	14d
69	France	15–21	New Zealand	25 November 1967	1	119d (3m27d)
70	New Zealand	6–17	South Africa	25 July 1970	8	973d (2y8m0d)
71	South Africa	8–9	New Zealand	8 August 1970	0	14d
72	New Zealand	3–14	South Africa	29 August 1970	0	21d
73	South Africa	9–18	England	3 June 1972	6	644d (1y9m5d)
74	England	0–9	New Zealand	6 January 1973	0	217d (7m3d)
75	New Zealand	6–13	France	10 February 1973	1	35d (1m4d)
76	France	6–14	England	24 February 1973	0	14d
77	England	14–16	Scotland	2 February 1974	3	343d (11m9d)
78	Scotland	6–9	Ireland	2 March 1974	0	28d (1m0d)
79	Ireland	6–15	New Zealand	23 November 1974	0^{10}	266d (8m21d)
80	New Zealand	7–16	South Africa	24 July 1976	2	609d(1y8m1d)
81	South Africa	9–15	New Zealand	14 August 1976	0	21d
82	New Zealand	10–15	South Africa	4 September 1976	0	21d
83	South Africa	9–14	New Zealand	15 August 1981	3^{11}	1806d (4y11m11d)
84	New Zealand	12–24	South Africa	29 August 1981	0	14d
85	South Africa	22–25	New Zealand	12 September 1981	0	14d
86	New Zealand	16–19	Australia	28 August 1982	4	350d (11m16d)
87	Australia	18–33	New Zealand	11 September 1982	0	14d
88	New Zealand	9–15	England	19 November 1983	2^{12}	434d (1y2m8d)
89	England	6–18	Scotland	4 February 1984	0	77d (2m16d)
90	Scotland	22–28	Romania	20 May 1984	2	106d (3m16d)
91	Romania	3–18	France	10 November 1984	0	174d (5m21d)
92	France	16–24	Argentina	22 June 1985	8^{13}	224d (7m12d)
93	Argentina	15–23	France	29 June 1985	0	7d
94	France	17–18	Scotland	19 January 1986	4	204d (6m21d)
95	Scotland	15–22	Wales	2 February 1986	0	14d
96	Wales	15–23	France	2 March 1986	1	28d (1m0d)
97	France	13–15	Argentina	31 May 1986	4	62d (2m1d)
98	Argentina	9–22	France	7 June 1986	0	35d (1m4d)
99	France	14–27	Australia	21 June 1986	0	14d
100	Australia	12–13	New Zealand	23 August 1986	3	63d (2m2d)
101	New Zealand	9–22	Australia	6 September 1986	0	14d
102	Australia	24–30	France	13 June 1987	5	280d (9m7d)
103	France	9–29	New Zealand	20 June 1987	0	7d
104	New Zealand	9–21	Australia	18 August 1990	17	1155d (3y1m29d)
105	Australia	3–6	New Zealand	24 August 1991	3	371d (1y0m6d)
106	New Zealand	6–16	Australia	27 October 1991	4	64d (2m3d)
107	Australia	23–26	New Zealand	25 July 1992	5	272d (8m28d)
108	New Zealand	9–15	England	27 November 1993	4^{14}	490d (1y4m2d)
109	England	12–13	Ireland	19 February 1994	1	84d (2m23d)
110	Ireland	13–33	Australia	5 June 1994	1	106d (3m17d)
111	Australia	18–27	South Africa	25 May 1995	7	354d (11m20d)
112	South Africa	16–21	Australia	13 July 1996	9	415d (1y1m18d)
113	Australia	25–32	New Zealand	27 July 1996	0	14d
114	New Zealand	22–32	South Africa	31 August 1996	3	35d (1m4d)
115	South Africa	32–35	New Zealand	19 July 1997	6^{15}	322d (10m19d)
116	New Zealand	16–24	Australia	11 July 1998	9	357d (11m22d)
117	Australia	13–14	South Africa	18 July 1998	0	7d
118	South Africa	7–13	England	5 December 1998	6	140d (4m17d)
119	England	31–32	Wales	11 April 1999	3	127d (4m6d)
120	Wales	31–38	Samoa	14 October 1999	7	186d (6m3d)
121	Samoa	20–35	Scotland	20 October 1999	0	6d
122	Scotland	18–30	New Zealand	24 October 1999	0	4d
123	New Zealand	31–43	France	31 October 1999	0	7d
124	France	12–35	Australia	6 November 1999	0	6d
125	Australia	35–39	New Zealand	15 July 2000	3	252d (8m9d)
126	New Zealand	23–24	Australia	5 August 2000	1	21d
127	Australia	19–22	England	18 November 2000	3	105d (3m13d)
128	England	14–20	Ireland	20 October 2001	9	336d (11m2d)
129	Ireland	29–40	New Zealand	17 November 2001	1	28d
130	New Zealand	14–16	Australia	3 August 2002	8	259d (8m17d)
131	Australia	31–33	South Africa	17 August 2002	0	14d
132	South Africa	10–30	France	9 November 2002	0	84d (2m23d)
133	France	17–25	England	15 February 2003	2	98d (3m6d)
134	England	16–17	France	30 August 2003	7	196d (6m15d)
135	France	14–45	England	6 September 2003	0	7d
136	England	13–19	Ireland	6 March 2004	9	182d (6m0d)
137	Ireland	17–31	South Africa	12 June 2004	2	98d (3m6d)
138	South Africa	21–23	New Zealand	24 July 2004	2^{16}	42d (1m12d)
139	New Zealand	18–23	Australia	7 August 2004	0	14d
140	Australia	19–23	South Africa	21 August 2004	0	14d
141	South Africa	12–17	Ireland	13 November 2004	1	84d (2m23d)
142	Ireland	19–26	France	12 March 2005	5	119d (3m27d)
143	France	13–27	South Africa	25 June 2005	2	105d (3m13d)
144	South Africa	12–30	Australia	9 July 2005	0	14d
145	Australia	20–33	South Africa	23 July 2005	0	14d
146	South Africa	12–30	New Zealand	27 August 2005	2	35d (1m4d)
147	New Zealand	20–21	South Africa	2 September 2006	13	371d (1y0m6d)
148	South Africa	15–32	Ireland	11 November 2006	1	70d (2m9d)
149	Ireland	17–20	France	11 February 2007	3	92d (3m0d)
150	France	18–26	England	11 March 2007	1	28d (1m0d)
151	England	18–27	Wales	17 March 2007	0	6d
152	Wales	23–29	Australia	26 May 2007	0	70d (2m9d)
153	Australia	19–22	South Africa	16 June 2007	2	21d
154	South Africa	21–26	New Zealand	23 June 2007	0	7d
155	New Zealand	15–20	Australia	30 June 2007	0	7d
156	Australia	12–26	New Zealand	21 July 2007	1	21d
157	New Zealand	18–20	France	6 October 2007	4	77d (2m15d)
158	France	9–14	England	13 October 2007	0	7d
159	England	6–15	South Africa	20 October 2007	0	7d
160	South Africa	8–19	New Zealand	5 July 2008	4	259d (8m15d)
161	New Zealand	28–30	South Africa	12 July 2008	0	7d
162	South Africa	9–16	Australia	19 July 2008	0	7d
163	Australia	10–39	New Zealand	2 August 2008	1	14d
164	New Zealand	22–27	France	13 June 2009	8	315d (10m11d)
165	France	10–14	New Zealand	20 June 2009	0	7d
166	New Zealand	19–28	South Africa	25 July 2009	2	35d (1m5d)
167	South Africa	6–21	Australia	12 September 2009	3	49d (1m18d)
168	Australia	6–33	New Zealand	19 September 2009	0	7d
169	New Zealand	24–26	Australia	30 October 2010	14	406d (1y1m11d)
170	Australia	18–35	England	13 November 2010	1	14d
171	England	11–21	South Africa	27 November 2010	1	14d
172	South Africa	20–39	Australia	27 July 2011	0	242d (8m0d)
173	Australia	14–30	New Zealand	6 August 2011	0	10d
174	New Zealand	5–18	South Africa	20 August 2011	0	14d
175	South Africa	9–11	Australia	9 October 2011	4	50d (1m19d)
176	Australia	6–20	New Zealand	16 October 2011	0	7d
177	New Zealand	21–38	England	1 December 2012	14	412d (1y1m14d)
178	England	3–30	Wales	16 March 2013	4	95d (3m5d)
179	Wales	8–23	Japan	8 June 2013	1	94d (3m2d)
180	Japan	6–54	New Zealand	2 November 2013	2	147d (4m25d)
181	New Zealand	25–27	South Africa	4 October 2014	11	336d (11m2d)
182	South Africa	15–29	Ireland	8 December 2014	1	64d (2m4d)
183	Ireland	16–23	Wales	14 March 2015	5	96d (3m6d)
184	Wales	21–35	Ireland	8 August 2015	1	147d (4m25d)
185	Ireland	10–16	Wales	29 August 2015	1	21d
186	Wales	6–15	Australia	10 October 2015	4	42d (1m11d)
187	Australia	17–34	New Zealand	31 October 2015	2	21d
188	New Zealand	29–40	Ireland	5 November 2016	10	371d (1y0m5d)
189	Ireland	9–21	New Zealand	19 November 2016	1	14d
190	New Zealand	18–23	Australia	21 October 2017	8^{17}	336d (11m2d)
191	Australia	6–30	England	18 November 2017	2	28d
192	England	13–25	Scotland	24 February 2018	3	98d (3m6d)
193	Scotland	8–28	Ireland	10 March 2018	0	14d
194	Ireland	8–19	Australia	9 June 2018	1	91d (2m30d)
195	Australia	21–26	Ireland	16 June 2018	0	7d
196	Ireland	20–32	England	2 February 2019	5	231d (7m17d)
197	England	13–21	Wales	23 February 2019	1	21d
198	Wales	19–33	England	12 August 2019	2	170d (5m20d)
199	England	6–13	Wales	17 August 2019	0	5d
200	Wales	17–22	Ireland	31 August 2019	0	14d
201	Ireland	12–19	Japan	28 September 2019	2	28d
202	Japan	3–26	South Africa	20 October 2019	2	22d
203	South Africa	26–28	Australia	12 September 2021	5	693d (1y10m23d)^{18}
204	Australia	13–15	Scotland	7 November 2021	4	56d (1m26d)
205	Scotland	15–30	South Africa	13 November 2021	0	6d
206	South Africa	26–27	England	20 November 2021	0	7d
207	England	17–20	Scotland	5 February 2022	0	76d (2m16d)
208	Scotland	17–20	Wales	12 February 2022	0	7d
209	Wales	19–23	England	26 February 2022	0	14d
210	England	15–32	Ireland	12 March 2022	0	14d
211	Ireland	19–42	New Zealand	2 July 2022	1	112d (3m20d)
212	New Zealand	12–23	Ireland	9 July 2022	0	7d
213	Ireland	24–28	New Zealand	14 October 2023	16	462d (1y3m5d)
214	New Zealand	11–12	South Africa	28 October 2023	1	14d
215	South Africa	24–25	Ireland	13 July 2024	2	259d (8m15d)
216	Ireland	13–23	New Zealand	8 November 2024	0	118d (3m26d)
217	New Zealand	29–30	France	16 November 2024	0	8d
218	France	25–26	England	8 February 2025	2	84d (2m23d)
219	England	20–31	Scotland	14 February 2026	11	371d
220	Scotland	21–43	Ireland	14 March 2026	2	28d (1m)
221	Ireland	21–40	New Zealand	18 July 2026	2	126d (4m4d)
222	New Zealand	26–33	South Africa	29 August 2026	1	42d (1m11d)
223	South Africa	38–42	Australia	27 September 2026	2	29d
224	Australia	19–50	New Zealand	10 October 2026	0	13d
225	New Zealand	28–35	Wales	14 November 2026	2	35d
226	Wales	26–29	Australia	21 November 2026	0	7d
227	Australia				0 (ongoing)	

== Most shield defences ==
Most shield defences by each team
	Team	Def.	Chal.	Cons.
1	New Zealand	159	45	17
2	South Africa	92	35	11
3	England	71	29	11
4	Ireland	53	25	16
5	Australia	46	32	7
6	France	29	17	8
7	Wales	24	18	7
8	Scotland	18	19	4
9	Japan	4	2	2
10	Argentina	0	2	0
11	Romania	0	1	0
12	Samoa	0	1	0

- Def.: Times a team kept hold of the shield.
- Chal.: Times a team took hold of the shield from another team.
- Cons.: Maximum length of consecutive shield defences.

Highest consecutive shield defences
No.	Team	Start	Def.	Score	End	Score	Chal.	Tenure
17	New Zealand	20 June 1987	France	9–29	18 August 1990	9–21	Australia	1155d (3y1m29d)
16	Ireland	9 July 2022	New Zealand	12–23	14 October 2023	24–28	New Zealand	462d (1y3m6d)
14	New Zealand	19 September 2009	Australia	6–33	30 October 2010	24–26	Australia	406d (1y1m11d)
14	New Zealand	16 October 2011	Australia	6–20	1 December 2012	21–38	England	412d (1y1m14d)
13	New Zealand	27 August 2005	South Africa	12–30	2 September 2006	20–21	South Africa	371d (1y0m6d)
11	South Africa	4 September 1937	New Zealand	6–13	5 September 1953	14–18	Australia	5845d (16y0m1d)^{6}
11	New Zealand	2 November 2013	Japan	6–54	4 October 2014	25–27	South Africa	336d (11m2d)
11	England	8 February 2025	France	25–26	14 February 2026	20–31	Scotland	371d (1y0m6d)
10	New Zealand	31 October 2015	Australia	17–34	5 November 2016	29–40	Ireland	371d (1y0m5d)
9	England	3 March 1883	Scotland	1T–2T	5 February 1887	0G–2G	Ireland	1435d (3y11m2d)
9	South Africa	27 August 1960	New Zealand	3–8	10 August 1963	5–9	Australia	1078d (2y11m14d)
9	South Africa	25 May 1995	Australia	18–27	13 July 1996	16–21	Australia	415d (1y1m18d)
9	New Zealand	9 July 1997	South Africa	32–35	11 July 1998	16–24	Australia	357d (11m22d)
9	England	18 November 2000	Australia	19–22	20 October 2001	14–20	Ireland	336d (11m2d)
9	England	6 September 2003	France	14–45	6 March 2004	13–19	Ireland	182d (6m0d)

== See also ==
- Utrecht Shield, the women's version of the trophy
- List of rugby union competitions

== Notes ==
- ^1 Excludes two wins and one loss against the British & Irish Lions in 1910.
- ^2 Due to World War 1, South Africa played no tests from 1914 until 1921.
- ^3 Excludes three wins and one draw against the British & Irish Lions in 1924.
- ^4Excludes one win against the British & Irish Lions in 1930 and one win against the Māori All Blacks in 1931.
- ^5 Excludes two wins and one loss against the British & Irish Lions in 1938.
- ^6 Due to World War 2, South Africa played no tests from 1939 until 1949.
- ^7 Excludes two wins and two losses against the British & Irish Lions in 1955.
- ^8 Excludes three wins and one loss against the British & Irish Lions in 1959.
- ^9 Excludes three wins and one draw against the British & Irish Lions in 1962.
- ^10 Excludes one draw against the Presidents XV in 1974.
- ^11 Excludes one win against the World XV in 1977, four wins against the South American XV in 1980 and three wins and one loss against the British & Irish Lions, also in 1980.
- ^12 Excludes four wins against the British & Irish Lions in 1983.
- ^13 Includes one win against the now-defunct Soviet Union team (which is now Georgia and Russia, among others) in 1985.
- ^14 Excludes two wins and one loss against the British & Irish Lions in 1993.
- ^15 Excludes two losses and one win against the British & Irish Lions in 1997.
- ^16 Excludes one win against the Pacific Islanders in 2004.
- ^17 Excludes one win, one loss and one draw against the British & Irish Lions in 2017.
- ^18 After the 2019 Rugby World Cup, South Africa did not play a match until 2021. This was due to complications faced with preparation and travel as a result of the COVID-19 pandemic.
