= Norway Rugby Championship =

Rugby union competition in Norway

- Sport: Rugby union
- Instituted: 1994
- Number of teams: 6
- Country: Norway
- Holders: Stavanger Rugbyklubb (2014)

The Norway Rugby Championship (Norwegian: Norgesmesterskap i rugby) is the highest tier of domestic club rugby union competition in Norway. It is operated by the Norwegian Rugby Union (Norges Rugbyforbund)

== History ==
The competition was first contested in 1994.

== Current clubs ==
Club	Titles
Bergen Rugbyklubb	8
Oslo Rugbyklubb	7
Stavanger Rugbyklubb	2
Blindern Rugbyklubb	0
Tønsberg Rugbyklubb	0
NTNUI	0

== Format ==
Six teams take part and each team plays six matches (one match against each team and the finals day) which then leads to play-offs and a final and placing matches. The season runs from May through October of the same year.

== Final results ==
Year	Champion	Score	Runner-up	Place
1994
1995
1996
1997
1998
1999	Bergen Rugbyklubb
2000	Stavanger Rugbyklubb
2001	Bergen Rugbyklubb
2002	Oslo Rugbyklubb	15-6	Bergen Rugbyklubb
2003	Oslo Rugbyklubb	5-3	Bergen Rugbyklubb
2004	Bergen Rugbyklubb	14-11	Oslo Rugbyklubb
2005	Bergen Rugbyklubb	18-7	Oslo Rugbyklubb
2006	Bergen Rugbyklubb	23-3	East Coast Barbarians
2007	Oslo Rugbyklubb
2008	Oslo Rugbyklubb	20-13	Bergen Rugbyklubb
2009	Bergen Rugbyklubb	32-24	Stavanger Rugbyklubb
2010	Oslo Rugbyklubb	21-5	Bergen Rugbyklubb	Fana Stadion, Bergen
2011	Oslo Rugbyklubb	6-5	Bergen Rugbyklubb
2012	Oslo Rugbyklubb	31-5	Bergen Rugbyklubb
2013	Bergen Rugbyklubb	17-9	Oslo Rugbyklubb	Bislett Stadion, Oslo
2014	Stavanger Rugbyklubb	26-12	Oslo Rugbyklubb	Fana Stadion, Bergen
2015				Stavanger
