= WRU Division Four South East =

Welsh rugby union league

- Founded: 1995
- No. of teams: 12
- Country: Wales
- Most recent champion: Porth Harlequins RFC (2011–12)
- Level on pyramid: 5
- Promotion to: WRU Division Three South East
- Relegation to: WRU Division Five South East
- Website: www.wru.co.uk/eng/club/swalecleagues/index.php

The Welsh Rugby Union Division Four South East (also called the SWALEC Division Three South East for sponsorship reasons) is a rugby union league in Wales.

== Competition ==
There are 12 clubs in the WRU Division Three South East. During the course of a season (which lasts from September to May) each club plays the others twice, once at their home ground and once at that of their opponents for a total of 22 games for each club, with a total of 132 games in each season. Teams receive four points for a win and two point for a draw, and additional bonus win is awarded to either team if they score four tries or more in a single match. No points are awarded for a loss though the losing team can gain a bonus point for finishing the match within seven points of the winning team. Teams are ranked by total points, then the number of tries scored and then points difference. At the end of each season, the club with the most points is crowned as champion. If points are equal the tries scored then points difference determines the winner. The team who is declared champion at the end of the season is eligible for promotion to the WRU Division Three South East. The two lowest placed teams are relegated to the WRU Division Five South East.

=== Sponsorship ===
In 2008 the Welsh Rugby Union announced a new sponsorship deal for the club rugby leagues with SWALEC valued at £1 million (GBP). The initial three year sponsorship was extended at the end of the 2010/11 season, making SWALEC the league sponsors until 2015. The leagues sponsored are the WRU Divisions one through to seven.

- (2002-2005) Lloyds TSB
- (2005-2008) Asda
- (2008-2015) SWALEC

== 2011/2012 Season ==
=== League teams ===
- Abercwmboi RFC
- Barry RFC
- Bridgend Sports RFC
- Llandaff North RFC
- Llandaff RFC
- Llantwit Major RFC
- Nantymoel RFC
- Penygraig RFC
- Pontyclun RFC
- Pontycymmer RFC
- Porth Harlequins RFC
- Wattstown RFC

=== 2011/2012 table ===
2011-12 WRU Division Four South East League Table
	Club	Played	Won	Drawn	Lost	Points for	Points against	Tries for	Tries against	Try bonus	Losing bonus	Points
1	Porth Harlequins RFC	22	19	0	3	608	341	88	38	15	1	92
2	Pontyclun RFC	22	17	0	5	494	244	61	25	9	4	81
3	Nantymoel RFC	22	14	2	6	484	313	59	38	6	2	68
4	Wattstown RFC	22	12	4	6	418	281	49	33	5	1	62
5	Abercwmboi RFC	22	12	0	10	364	308	40	34	3	6	57
6	Llandaff RFC	22	11	1	10	394	329	50	38	5	5	56
7	Pontycymmer RFC	22	10	2	10	366	413	41	54	3	1	48
8	Barry RFC	22	9	1	12	339	376	39	46	3	6	47
9	Llantwit Major RFC	22	7	1	14	308	549	36	73	2	3	35
10	Llandaff North RFC	22	5	3	14	314	412	37	45	1	8	35
11	Bridgend Sports RFC	22	3	3	16	271	513	32	70	2	6	26
12	Penygraig RFC	22	3	3	16	228	509	27	65	0	4	22
Correct as of 2 June 2012

== 2010/2011 Season ==
=== League teams ===
- Abercwmboi RFC
- Barry RFC
- Cardiff HSOB RFC
- Llandaff RFC
- Llantwit Major RFC
- Nantymoel RFC
- Pontyclun RFC
- Porth Harlequins RFC
- Rhiwbina RFC
- St. Joseph's RFC
- Tonyrefail RFC
- Treherbert RFC

=== 2010/2011 table ===
2010-11 WRU Division Four South East League Table
	Club	Played	Won	Drawn	Lost	Points for	Points against	Tries for	Tries against	Try bonus	Losing bonus	Points
1	Rhiwbina RFC	22	19	0	3	607	316	80	38	9	1	86
2	Tonyrefail RFC	22	18	0	4	665	344	86	41	9	2	83
3	Pontyclun RFC	22	15	1	6	678	331	106	39	12	4	78
4	Llantwit Major RFC	22	14	1	7	516	414	67	51	7	2	67
5	Barry RFC	22	13	0	9	472	371	54	39	7	2	61
6	Porth Harlequins RFC	22	11	0	11	536	513	80	66	12	5	61
7	Cardiff HSOB RFC	22	10	1	11	515	661	67	95	8	3	53
8	Nantymoel RFC	22	11	0	11	439	485	43	61	5	3	52
9	Abercwmboi RFC	22	9	0	13	401	502	43	65	3	5	44
10	Llandaff RFC	22	5	1	16	332	568	46	76	6	6	34
11	St. Joseph's RFC	22	4	0	18	344	653	42	93	2	5	23
12	Treherbert RFC	22	1	0	21	255	602	32	82	1	6	11
Correct as of 2 June 2012

== 2009/2010 Season ==
=== League teams ===
- Abercwmboi RFC
- Cardiff HSOB RFC
- Dowlais RFC
- Ferndale RFC
- Llantwit Major RFC
- Nantymoel RFC
- Pontyclun RFC
- Pontycymmer RFC
- Porth Harlequins RFC
- Rhiwbina RFC
- Taffs Well RFC
- Tonyrefail RFC

=== 2009-10 table ===
2009-2010 WRU Division Four South East League Table
Club	Played	Won	Drawn	Lost	Points for	Points against	Tries for	Tries against	Try bonus	Losing bonus	Points
Dowlais RFC	22	18	1	3	545	256	75	23	10	2	86
Taffs Well RFC	22	16	1	5	527	307	61	33	8	4	78
Porth Harlequins RFC	22	15	1	6	506	355	70	35	12	2	76
Cardiff HSOB RFC	22	14	1	7	501	389	65	49	10	3	71
Abercwmboi RFC	22	11	3	8	452	344	45	33	4	6	60
Tonyrefail RFC	22	10	0	12	442	365	57	44	6	9	55
Rhiwbina RFC	22	11	0	11	331	392	34	45	1	3	48
Pontyclun RFC	22	9	0	13	400	432	47	54	3	6	45
Nantymoel RFC	22	7	1	14	316	407	33	49	2	10	42
Llantwit Major RFC	22	7	0	15	307	428	38	54	2	8	38
Pontycymmer RFC	22	6	1	15	313	490	28	67	1	4	31
Ferndale RFC	22	3	1	18	264	739	35	102	1	1	16
Correct as of 4 August 2010

== 2008/2009 Season ==
=== League teams ===
- Abercwmboi RFC
- Cardiff HSOB RFC
- Cefn Coed RFC
- Dowlais RFC
- Ferndale RFC
- Heol y Cyw RFC
- Llantwit Major RFC
- Pentyrch RFC
- Porth Harlequins RFC
- Senghenydd RFC
- Taffs Well RFC
- Tonyrefail RFC

=== 2008-09 table ===
2008-2009 WRU Division Four South East League Table
Club	Played	Won	Drawn	Lost	Points for	Points against	Tries for	Tries against	Try bonus	Losing bonus	Points
Pentyrch RFC	22	19	0	3	542	210	78	25	11	1	88
Heol y Cyw RFC	22	17	2	3	513	219	70	24	9	3	84
Porth Harlequins RFC	22	16	1	5	443	300	64	36	9	2	77
Cardiff HSOB RFC	22	13	0	9	554	442	73	63	8	4	64
Llantwit Major RFC	22	12	0	10	465	397	58	57	8	6	62
Dowlais RFC	22	13	0	9	463	334	59	45	6	2	60
Abercwmboi RFC	22	12	0	10	398	358	50	44	5	5	54
Taffs Well RFC	22	10	0	12	336	533	35	74	2	3	45
Ferndale RFC	22	7	2	13	397	451	53	57	3	4	39
Tonyrefail RFC	22	5	2	15	341	564	49	72	5	5	34
Senghenydd RFC	22	2	1	19	303	542	35	75	3	6	19
Cefn Coed RFC	22	2	0	20	200	605	26	78	1	1	10
Correct as of 2009-07-02

== 2007/2008 Season ==
=== League teams ===
- Abercwmboi RFC
- Aberdare RFC
- Barry RFC
- Cardiff HSOB RFC
- Cefn Coed RFC
- Cilfynydd RFC
- Dowlais RFC
- Ferndale RFC
- Llantwit Major RFC
- Llandaff North RFC
- Pentyrch RFC
- Taffs Well RFC

=== 2007/2008 Table ===
2007-2008 WRU Division Four South East League Table
Club	Played	Won	Drawn	Lost	Points for	Points against	Tries for	Tries against	Try bonus	Losing bonus	Points
Llandaff North RFC	22	18	2	2	597	219	83	22	10	2	88
Aberdare RFC	22	14	3	5	467	279	63	29	6	3	71
Taffs Well RFC	22	12	2	8	361	307	38	37	1	6	59
Dowlais RFC	22	12	0	10	337	319	43	36	5	3	56
Cardiff HSOB RFC	22	11	1	10	430	376	52	47	5	4	55
Abercwmboi RFC	22	11	2	9	299	352	28	44	1	2	51
Llantwit Major RFC	22	9	2	11	283	356	39	46	2	7	49
Pentyrch RFC	22	10	2	10	259	304	33	38	1	3	48
Cefn Coed RFC	22	8	0	14	277	365	32	42	2	7	41
Ferndale RFC	22	7	2	13	337	426	39	55	2	7	41
Barry RFC	22	6	1	15	283	425	33	56	1	6	33
Cilfynydd RFC	22	5	1	16	354	556	46	77	2	5	29
Correct as of 2007-10-21
