= WRU Division Three South East =

Wales rugby union league

- Founded: 1995
- No. of teams: 12
- Country: Wales
- Most recent champion: Llanishen RFC (2011–12)
- Level on pyramid: 4
- Promotion to: WRU Division Two East
- Relegation to: WRU Division Four East
- Website: www.wru.co.uk/eng/club/swalecleagues/index.php

The Welsh Rugby Union Division Three East (also called the SWALEC Division Three South East for sponsorship reasons) is a rugby union league in Wales.

== Competition format and sponsorship ==
=== Competition ===
There are 12 clubs in the WRU Division Three South East. During the course of a season (which lasts from September to May) each club plays the others twice, once at their home ground and once at that of their opponents for a total of 22 games for each club, with a total of 132 games in each season. Teams receive four points for a win and two point for a draw, an additional bonus win is awarded to either team if they score four tries or more in a single match. No points are awarded for a loss though the losing team can gain a bonus point for finishing the match within seven points of the winning team. Teams are ranked by total points, then the number of tries scored and then points difference. At the end of each season, the club with the most points is crowned as champion. If points are equal the tries scored then points difference determines the winner. The team who is declared champion at the end of the season is eligible for promotion to the WRU Division Two East. The two lowest placed teams are relegated to the WRU Division Four South East.

=== Sponsorship ===
In 2008 the Welsh Rugby Union announced a new sponsorship deal for the club rugby leagues with SWALEC valued at £1 million (GBP). The initial three year sponsorship was extended at the end of the 2010/11 season, making SWALEC the league sponsors until 2015. The leagues sponsored are the WRU Divisions one through to seven.

- (2002-2005) Lloyds TSB
- (2005-2008) Asda
- (2008-2015) SWALEC

== 2011/2012 Season ==
=== League teams ===
- Aberdare RFC
- Brecon RFC
- Dowlais RFC
- Fairwater RFC
- Gwernyfed RFC
- Llanishen RFC
- Nelson RFC
- Penarth RFC
- Pentyrch RFC
- Rhiwbina RFC
- St. Peters RFC
- Tonyrefail RFC

=== 2011/2012 table ===
2011-12 WRU Division Three South East League Table
	Club	Played	Won	Drawn	Lost	Points for	Points against	Tries for	Tries against	Try bonus	Losing bonus	Points
1	Llanishen RFC	22	19	1	2	530	238	60	28	6	1	85
2	Rhiwbina RFC	22	14	2	6	593	383	78	46	9	3	72
3	Nelson RFC	22	14	2	6	552	407	69	45	9	3	72
4	St. Peters RFC	22	14	2	6	514	438	69	53	10	2	72
5	Fairwater RFC	22	12	0	10	448	399	59	38	5	4	57
6	Brecon RFC	22	11	1	10	399	400	48	47	4	5	55
7	Dowlais RFC	22	9	3	10	338	370	45	46	3	4	49
8	Gwernyfed RFC	22	9	0	13	412	439	54	54	5	6	47
9	Aberdare RFC	22	8	1	13	400	479	45	60	4	5	43
10	Tonyrefail RFC	22	8	0	14	368	444	40	56	2	8	42
11	Pentyrch RFC	22	7	2	13	340	461	36	58	3	4	39
12	Penarth RFC	22	0	0	22	297	733	32	104	1	6	7
Correct as of 29 May 2012

== 2010/2011 Season ==
=== League teams ===
- Abercynon RFC
- Aberdare RFC
- Brecon RFC
- Dowlais RFC
- Fairwater RFC
- Gwernyfed RFC
- Heol y Cyw RFC
- Llandaff North RFC
- Llanishen RFC
- Pentyrch RFC
- St. Peters RFC
- Taffs Well RFC

=== 2010/2011 table ===
2010-11 WRU Division Three South East League Table
	Club	Played	Won	Drawn	Lost	Points for	Points against	Tries for	Tries against	Try bonus	Losing bonus	Points
1	Abercynon RFC	22	18	0	4	705	393	90	51	13	1	86
2	Heol y Cyw RFC	22	18	1	3	595	281	78	32	8	2	84
3	St. Peters RFC	22	15	1	6	487	360	68	38	9	3	74
4	Gwernyfed RFC	22	14	1	7	506	412	67	49	8	1	67
5	Aberdare RFC	22	13	0	9	509	435	68	53	8	5	65
6	Llanishen RFC	22	11	1	10	454	353	46	35	5	6	57
7	Dowlais RFC	22	8	0	14	399	391	53	41	4	10	46
8	Fairwater RFC	22	10	1	11	355	492	40	63	2	1	45
9	Pentyrch RFC	22	7	1	14	375	551	46	76	3	5	38
10	Brecon RFC	22	7	0	15	408	507	45	64	3	7	38
11	Llandaff North RFC	22	4	0	18	347	606	39	82	2	7	25
12	Taffs Well RFC	22	4	0	18	252	611	25	81	0	4	20
Correct as of 29 May 2012

== 2009/2010 Season ==
=== League teams ===
- Aberdare RFC
- Brecon RFC
- Fairwater RFC
- Heol y Cyw RFC
- Llandaff RFC
- Llandaff North RFC
- Llanishen RFC
- Penarth RFC
- Pentyrch RFC
- St. Peters RFC
- Treherbert RFC
- Tylorstown RFC

=== 2009/2010 Table ===
2009-2010 WRU Division Three South East League Table
Club	Played	Won	Drawn	Lost	Points for	Points against	Tries for	Tries against	Try bonus	Losing bonus	Points
Tylorstown RFC	22	18	0	4	598	321	76	35	10	2	84
Penarth RFC	22	17	2	3	573	222	77	25	9	3	84
St. Peters RFC	22	16	1	5	497	210	72	19	9	3	78
Aberdare RFC	22	13	2	7	518	391	73	49	9	4	69
Heol y Cyw RFC	22	12	2	8	430	329	49	41	2	4	58
Pentyrch RFC	22	12	0	10	416	404	55	56	5	4	57
Llanishen RFC	22	11	1	10	322	326	32	41	2	6	54
Brecon RFC	22	8	1	13	367	372	44	46	5	6	45
Llandaff North RFC	22	7	0	15	325	567	35	77	3	3	34
Fairwater RFC	22	6	1	15	253	396	32	50	2	5	33
Treherbert RFC	22	5	0	17	290	672	37	86	3	5	28
Llandaff RFC	22	2	0	20	229	608	31	88	1	5	14
Correct as of 3 August 2010

== 2008/2009 Season ==
=== League teams ===
- Aberdare RFC
- Brecon RFC
- Fairwater RFC
- Llandaff North RFC
- Llanishen RFC
- Llantwit Fardre RFC
- Nantymoel RFC
- Old Illtydians RFC
- Penarth RFC
- St. Peters RFC
- Treorchy RFC
- Tylorstown RFC

=== 2008/2009 Table ===
2008-2009 WRU Division Three South East League Table
Club	Played	Won	Drawn	Lost	Points for	Points against	Tries for	Tries against	Try bonus	Losing bonus	Points
Treorchy RFC	22	21	0	1	742	223	101	20	14	0	98
Llantwit Fardre RFC	22	20	0	2	622	254	82	30	10	0	90
St. Peters RFC	22	13	1	8	486	366	66	37	7	4	65
Llanishen RFC	22	11	1	10	443	321	47	34	4	8	58
Tylorstown RFC	22	11	1	10	436	391	46	44	3	6	55
Brecon RFC	22	10	0	12	372	414	46	49	6	7	53
Penarth RFC	22	11	1	10	427	438	55	56	4	2	52
Llandaff North RFC^{1}	22	9	1	12	455	547	63	70	7	2	41
Fairwater RFC	22	8	1	13	273	382	33	50	1	6	41
Aberdare RFC	22	6	0	16	437	553	54	74	5	5	34
Nantymoel RFC	22	4	1	17	269	678	32	100	1	2	21
Old Illtydians RFC	22	4	1	17	189	584	20	81	0	1	19
Correct as of 2009-05-16

^{1}Llandaff North deducted 6 points for fielding an ineligible player

== 2007/2008 Season ==
At the end of the season Bedlinog were crowned champions and gained promotion to the Division Two East league, along with second placed Gilfoch Goch. Tonyrefail and Heol Y Cyw were relegated to Division Four South East.

=== League table ===
- Bedlinog RFC
- Brecon RFC
- Fairwater RFC
- Gilfach Goch RFC
- Heol y Cyw RFC
- Llantwit Fardre RFC
- Old Illtydians RFC
- Penarth RFC
- St. Peters RFC
- Tonyrefail RFC
- Treorchy RFC
- Tylorstown RFC

=== 2007/2008 Table ===
2007-2008 WRU Division Three South East League Table
Club	Played	Won	Drawn	Lost	Points for	Points against	Tries for	Tries against	Try bonus	Losing bonus	Points
Bedlinog RFC	22	20	1	1	490	190	59	12	7	1	90
Gilfach Goch RFC	22	15	0	7	420	259	53	28	8	5	73
Llantwit Fardre RFC	22	14	1	7	410	287	49	30	7	4	69
Tylorstown RFC	22	14	0	8	501	364	57	42	6	2	64
Treorchy RFC	22	12	0	10	431	403	48	50	3	3	54
St. Peters RFC	22	11	0	11	299	300	35	32	3	3	50
Old Illtydians RFC	22	10	1	11	385	359	46	40	2	6	50
Brecon RFC	22	9	0	13	358	435	43	59	3	6	45
Penarth RFC	22	8	1	13	341	357	44	43	2	8	44
Fairwater RFC	22	7	1	14	318	473	42	61	3	3	36
Tonyrefail RFC	22	5	1	16	330	566	41	70	3	5	30
Heol y Cyw RFC	22	4	0	18	279	569	31	81	1	6	23
Correct as of 2008-05-31

== 2006/2007 Season ==
=== League table ===
- Brecon RFC
- Fairwater RFC
- Gilfach Goch RFC
- Hirwaun RFC
- Llanishen RFC
- Penarth RFC
- Pencoed RFC
- Pentyrch RFC
- St. Peters RFC
- Tonyrefail RFC
- Treorchy RFC
- Tylorstown RFC

=== 2006/2007 Table ===
2006-07 WRU Division Three South East League Table
Club	Played	Won	Drawn	Lost	Points for	Points against	TF	Points
Pencoed RFC	22	20	0	2	606	198	87	60
Llanishen RFC	22	17	0	5	485	324	61	51
St. Peters RFC	22	15	1	6	543	305	67	46
Tylorstown RFC	22	12	2	8	444	357	49	38
Tonyrefail RFC	22	12	0	10	523	499	74	36
Treorchy RFC	22	12	0	10	448	444	54	36
Fairwater RFC	22	10	1	11	393	442	54	31
Gilfach Goch RFC	22	9	1	12	405	357	55	28
Nelson RFC	22	8	2	12	379	434	53	26
Brecon RFC	22	6	2	14	322	503	43	20
Pentrych RFC	22	4	1	17	334	511	46	13
Hirwaun RFC	22	2	0	20	222	690	29	6
Correct as of 2007-10-04
