= List of Wales women's national rugby union team matches =

The following is a list of Wales women's national rugby union team international matches.

== Overall ==
Wales overall international match record against all nations, updated to 6 September 2025, is as follows:

| | Games Played | Won | Drawn | Lost | Percentage of wins |
| Total | 249 | 89 | 4 | 156 | 35.74% |

== Full internationals ==
=== Legend ===
| Won | Lost | Draw |

=== 1980s ===
| Test | Date | Opponent | PF | PA | Venue | Note |
|---|---|---|---|---|---|---|
| 1 | 5 April 1987 | England | 4 | 22 | Pontypool Park, Pontypool | First international |
| 2 | 24 April 1988 | England | 6 | 36 | Newport RFC, Newport | |
| 3 | 27 November 1988 | Netherlands | 0 | 3 | Utrecht | |
| 4 | 12 February 1989 | England | 4 | 38 | Moseley RFC, Birmingham | |

=== 1990s ===
| Test | Date | Opponent | PF | PA | Venue | Note |
|---|---|---|---|---|---|---|
| 5 | 11 February 1990 | England | 12 | 18 | Neath RFC, Neath | |
| 6 | 24 March 1991 | England | 13 | 24 | Waterloo | |
| 7 | 8 April 1991 | Canada | 9 | 9 | Memorial Ground, Cardiff | 1991 World Cup |
| 8 | 10 April 1991 | New Zealand | 6 | 24 | Llanharan RFC, Llanharan | 1991 World Cup |
| 9 | 11 April 1991 | Netherlands | 3 | 6 | Cardiff Arms Park, Cardiff | 1991 World Cup |
| 10 | 9 February 1992 | England | 10 | 14 | Cardiff Arms Park, Cardiff | |
| 11 | 14 March 1993 | England | 5 | 23 | Northampton | |
| 12 | 8 June 1993 | Canada | 8 | 22 | Brampton | 1993 Canada Cup |
| 13 | 10 June 1993 | United States | 0 | 26 | Fletcher's Fields, Markham | 1993 Canada Cup |
| 14 | 12 June 1993 | England | 0 | 38 | Fletcher's Fields, Markham | 1993 Canada Cup |
| 15 | 19 December 1993 | Scotland | 23 | 0 | Burnbrae, Glasgow | |
| 16 | 13 February 1994 | England | 10 | 11 | Bridgend | |
| 17 | 11 April 1994 | Canada | 11 | 5 | Edinburgh Academicals, Edinburgh | 1994 World Cup |
| 18 | 13 April 1994 | Kazakhstan | 29 | 8 | Edinburgh Academicals, Edinburgh | 1994 World Cup |
| 19 | 17 April 1994 | Scotland | 8 | 0 | Melrose RFC, Melrose | 1994 World Cup |
| 20 | 20 April 1994 | United States | 15 | 56 | Gala RFC, Galashiels | 1994 World Cup |
| 21 | 24 April 1994 | France | 0 | 27 | Edinburgh Academicals, Edinburgh | 1994 World Cup |
| 22 | 12 February 1995 | Scotland | 0 | 5 | Brewery Field, Bridgend | |
| 23 | 12 February 1995 | England | 0 | 25 | Sale RFC, Sale | |
| 24 | 4 February 1996 | England | 3 | 56 | Leicester | 1996 Home Nations |
| 25 | 18 February 1996 | Scotland | 11 | 6 | Bridgend | 1996 Home Nations |
| 26 | 3 March 1996 | Ireland | 6 | 22 | Old Belvedere, Dublin | 1996 Home Nations |
| 27 | 12 January 1997 | Scotland | 0 | 10 | Meggetland Stadium, Edinburgh | 1997 Home Nations |
| 28 | 26 January 1997 | Ireland | 32 | 5 | Bridgend | 1997 Home Nations |
| 29 | 9 March 1997 | England | 22 | 24 | Worcester | 1997 Home Nations |
| 30 | 15 February 1998 | England | 12 | 29 | Waterloo | 1998 Home Nations |
| 31 | 1 March 1998 | Scotland | 12 | 22 | Cardiff | 1998 Home Nations |
| 32 | 22 March 1998 | Ireland | 27 | 10 | Old Crescent, Rosbrien | 1998 Home Nations |
| 33 | 2 May 1998 | Spain | 18 | 28 | Amsterdam | 1998 World Cup |
| 34 | 5 May 1998 | Russia | 83 | 7 | Amsterdam | 1998 World Cup |
| 35 | 9 May 1998 | Germany | 55 | 12 | Amsterdam | 1998 World Cup |
| 36 | 12 May 1998 | Kazakhstan | 13 | 18 | Amsterdam | 1998 World Cup |
| 37 | 15 May 1998 | Italy | 12 | 10 | Amsterdam | 1998 World Cup |
| 38 | 7 February 1999 | Scotland | 0 | 23 | Inverleith, Edinburgh | 1999 Five Nations |
| 39 | 21 February 1999 | Ireland | 26 | 0 | Stradey Park | 1999 Five Nations |
| 40 | 5 March 1999 | France | 5 | 34 | Savigny-sur-Orge | 1999 Five Nations |
| 41 | 10 April 1999 | England | 11 | 83 | Swansea | 1999 Five Nations |
| 42 | 19 April 1999 | Spain | 8 | 14 | Belluno | 1999 European Championship |
| 43 | 21 April 1999 | Italy | 28 | 17 | Belluno | 1999 European Championship |
| 44 | 24 April 1999 | Kazakhstan | 11 | 22 | Belluno | 1999 European Championship |

=== 2000s ===
| Test | Date | Opponent | PF | PA | Venue | Event |
|---|---|---|---|---|---|---|
| 45 | 4 February 2000 | France | 10 | 27 | Swansea | 2000 Five Nations |
| 46 | 5 March 2000 | England | 0 | 51 | Newbury | 2000 Five Nations |
| 47 | 19 March 2000 | Scotland | 12 | 36 | Caerphilly | 2000 Five Nations |
| 48 | 1 April 2000 | Spain | 10 | 18 | Majadahonda, Madrid | 2000 Five Nations |
| 49 | 8 May 2000 | Scotland | 6 | 28 | Alería | 2000 European Championship |
| 50 | 10 May 2000 | Italy | 25 | 24 | El Ejido | 2000 European Championship |
| 51 | 13 May 2000 | Kazakhstan | 6 | 3 | Vera | 2000 European Championship |
| 52 | 15 January 2001 | Netherlands | 72 | 5 | Brewery Field, Bridgend | |
| 53 | 4 February 2001 | England | 0 | 18 | Newport | 2001 Five Nations |
| 54 | 18 February 2001 | Scotland | 0 | 22 | Meggetland, Edinburgh | 2001 Five Nations |
| 55 | 16 March 2001 | France | 3 | 24 | Nanterre | 2001 Five Nations |
| 56 | 8 April 2001 | Spain | 0 | 5 | Wrexham | 2001 Five Nations |
| 57 | 6 May 2001 | Scotland | 3 | 13 | Hazebrouck | 2001 European Championship |
| 57 | 10 May 2001 | Ireland | 15 | 10 | Tourcoing | 2001 European Championship |
| 58 | 12 May 2001 | Kazakhstan | 17 | 7 | Villeneuve D'Ascq | 2001 European Championship |
| 59 | 18 October 2001 | Canada | 7 | 21 | Glamorgan Wanderers RFC, Cardiff | |
| 60 | 21 October 2001 | Canada | 11 | 12 | Caerphilly | |
| 61 | 28 October 2001 | Canada | 13 | 13 | Ebbw Vale | |
| 62 | 18 November 2001 | United States | 17 | 20 | Ebbw Vale | |
| 63 | 3 February 2002 | Ireland | 13 | 5 | Thomond Park, Limerick | 2002 Six Nations |
| 64 | 15 February 2002 | France | 0 | 20 | Brewery Field, Bridgend | 2002 Six Nations |
| 65 | 2 March 2002 | Spain | 0 | 20 | Madrid | 2002 Six Nations |
| 66 | 23 March 2002 | England | 0 | 40 | London Welsh, London | 2002 Six Nations |
| 67 | 7 April 2002 | Scotland | 3 | 31 | Stradey Park, Llanelli | 2002 Six Nations |
| 68 | 13 March 2002 | Australia | 0 | 30 | Barcelona | 2002 World Cup |
| 69 | 17 May 2002 | Germany | 77 | 0 | Barcelona | 2002 World Cup |
| 70 | 20 May 2002 | Italy | 35 | 3 | Barcelona | 2002 World Cup |
| 71 | 24 May 2002 | Samoa | 14 | 17 | Barcelona | 2002 World Cup |
| 72 | 15 February 2003 | Spain | 44 | 0 | Cardiff Arms Park, Cardiff | 2003 Six Nations |
| 73 | 21 February 2003 | England | 7 | 69 | Cardiff Arms Park, Cardiff | 2003 Six Nations |
| 74 | 9 March 2003 | Scotland | 8 | 9 | Meadowbank Stadium, Edinburgh | 2003 Six Nations |
| 75 | 21 March 2003 | Ireland | 17 | 0 | Cardiff Arms Park, Cardiff | 2003 Six Nations |
| 76 | 28 March 2003 | France | 7 | 34 | Paris | 2003 Six Nations |
| 77 | 14 February 2004 | Scotland | 10 | 30 | Cardiff Arms Park, Cardiff | 2004 Six Nations |
| 78 | 21 February 2004 | Ireland | 14 | 13 | Thomond Park, Limerick | 2004 Six Nations |
| 79 | 7 March 2004 | France | 0 | 22 | Cardiff Arms Park, Cardiff | 2004 Six Nations |
| 80 | 20 March 2004 | England | 3 | 53 | Twickenham Stoop, London | 2004 Six Nations |
| 81 | 23 March 2004 | Spain | 7 | 12 | Cardiff Arms Park, Cardiff | 2004 Six Nations |
| 82 | 1 May 2004 | Ireland | 24 | 7 | Toulouse | 2004 European Championship |
| 83 | 5 May 2004 | England | 3 | 39 | Toulouse | 2004 European Championship |
| 84 | 8 May 2004 | Scotland | 10 | 11 | Toulouse | 2004 European Championship |
| 85 | 29 May 2004 | South Africa | 8 | 5 | Port Elizabeth | |
| 86 | 5 June 2004 | South Africa | 16 | 15 | Loftus Versfeld Stadium, Pretoria | |
| 87 | 4 February 2005 | England | 0 | 81 | Cardiff Arms Park, Cardiff | 2005 Six Nations |
| 88 | 12 February 2005 | Spain | 10 | 10 | Orense, Santiago de Compostela | 2005 Six Nations |
| 89 | 25 February 2005 | France | 0 | 48 | Bondoufle, Paris | 2005 Six Nations |
| 90 | 13 March 2005 | Scotland | 5 | 22 | Murrayfield Stadium, Edinburgh | 2005 Six Nations |
| 91 | 18 March 2005 | Ireland | 6 | 11 | Cardiff Arms Park, Cardiff | 2005 Six Nations |
| 92 | 4 February 2006 | England | 15 | 38 | Old Albanians, St Albans | 2006 Six Nations |
| 93 | 11 February 2006 | Scotland | 5 | 0 | Sardis Road, Pontypridd | 2006 Six Nations |
| 94 | 25 February 2006 | Ireland | 14 | 7 | Donnybrook Stadium, Dublin | 2006 Six Nations |
| 95 | 10 March 2006 | Spain | 10 | 0 | Sardis Road, Pontypridd | 2006 Six Nations |
| 96 | 17 March 2006 | France | 11 | 10 | Sardis Road, Pontypridd | 2006 Six Nations |
| 97 | 6 May 2006 | Canada | 16 | 11 | Glamorgan Wanderers RFC, Cardiff | |
| 98 | 18 November 2006 | Italy | 31 | 7 | Glamorgan Wanderers RFC, Cardiff | |
| 99 | 3 December 2006 | Netherlands | 24 | 0 | Llanrumney | |
| 100 | 3 February 2007 | Ireland | 10 | 5 | Taffs Well RFC, Taff's Well | 2007 Six Nations |
| 101 | 10 February 2007 | Scotland | 10 | 0 | Dunbar | 2007 Six Nations |
| 102 | 24 February 2007 | France | 0 | 15 | Stade Guy Moquet, Paris | 2007 Six Nations |
| 103 | 11 March 2007 | Italy | 24 | 0 | Rome | 2007 Six Nations |
| 104 | 17 March 2007 | England | 0 | 30 | Taffs Well RFC, Taff's Well | 2007 Six Nations |
| 105^{a} | 28 April 2007 | Netherlands | 3 | 12 | Barcelona | 2007 European Championship |
| 106^{a} | 30 April 2007 | Sweden | 8 | 18 | Barcelona | 2007 European Championship |
| 107^{a} | 2 May 2007 | France | 10 | 17 | Barcelona | 2007 European Championship |
| 108^{a} | 5 May 2007 | Russia | 38 | 14 | Barcelona | 2007 European Championship |
| 109 | 9 November 2007 | Canada | 3 | 25 | Cardiff | |
| 110 | 2 February 2008 | England | 0 | 55 | London Irish, London | 2008 Six Nations |
| 111 | 10 February 2008 | Scotland | 23 | 6 | Taffs Well RFC, Taff's Well | 2008 Six Nations |
| 112 | 24 February 2008 | Italy | 27 | 5 | Taffs Well RFC, Taff's Well | 2008 Six Nations |
| 113 | 7 March 2008 | Ireland | 19 | 10 | St Mary's RFC, Dublin | 2008 Six Nations |
| 114 | 15 March 2008 | France | 3 | 0 | Taffs Well RFC, Taff's Well | 2008 Six Nations |
| 115 | 17 May 2008 | Scotland | 27 | 0 | Amsterdam | 2008 European Championship |
| 116 | 20 May 2008 | France | 18 | 10 | Leiden | 2008 European Championship |
| 117 | 24 May 2008 | England | 6 | 12 | Amsterdam | 2008 European Championship |
| 118 | 9 February 2009 | Scotland | 31 | 10 | Lasswade RFC, Bonnyrigg | 2009 Six Nations |
| 119 | 14 February 2009 | England | 16 | 15 | Taffs Well RFC, Taff's Well | 2009 Six Nations |
| 120 | 29 February 2009 | France | 5 | 27 | Montauban | 2009 Six Nations |
| 121 | 15 March 2009 | Italy | 29 | 7 | Mira | 2009 Six Nations |
| 122 | 21 March 2009 | Ireland | 13 | 10 | Taffs Well RFC, Taff's Well | 2009 Six Nations |
| 123 | 28 November 2009 | Sweden | 56 | 7 | St Helen's, Swansea | |

=== 2010s ===
| Test | Date | Opponent | PF | PA | Venue | Tournament |
|---|---|---|---|---|---|---|
| 124 | 6 February 2010 | England | 0 | 31 | Esher | 2010 Six Nations |
| 125 | 14 February 2010 | Scotland | 28 | 12 | Brewery Field, Bridgend | 2010 Six Nations |
| 126 | 28 February 2010 | France | 3 | 15 | Brewery Field, Bridgend | 2010 Six Nations |
| 127 | 12 March 2010 | Ireland | 3 | 18 | Ashbourne | 2010 Six Nations |
| 128 | 21 March 2010 | Italy | 15 | 19 | Brewery Field, Bridgend | 2010 Six Nations |
| 129 | 20 August 2010 | Australia | 12 | 26 | Surrey Park, Guildford | 2010 World Cup |
| 130 | 24 August 2010 | South Africa | 10 | 15 | Surrey Park, Guildford | 2010 World Cup |
| 131 | 28 August 2010 | New Zealand | 8 | 41 | Surrey Park, Guildford | 2010 World Cup |
| 132 | 1 September 2010 | Sweden | 32 | 10 | Surrey Park, Guildford | 2010 World Cup |
| 133 | 5 September 2010 | South Africa | 29 | 17 | Surrey Park, Guildford | 2010 World Cup |
| 134 | 6 February 2011 | England | 9 | 19 | Cross Keys RFC | 2011 Six Nations |
| 135 | 13 February 2011 | Scotland | 41 | 12 | Burnbrae, Milngavie | 2011 Six Nations |
| 136 | 27 February 2011 | Italy | 8 | 12 | Viareggio, Tuscany | 2011 Six Nations |
| 137 | 13 March 2011 | Ireland | 15 | 14 | Cross Keys RFC | 2011 Six Nations |
| 138 | 19 March 2011 | France | 0 | 15 | Bourgoin-Jallieu | 2011 Six Nations |
| 139 | 3 February 2012 | Ireland | 3 | 10 | Ashbourne RFC | 2012 Six Nations |
| 140 | 12 February 2012 | Scotland | 20 | 0 | Cross Keys | 2012 Six Nations |
| 141 | 25 February 2012 | England | 0 | 33 | Twickenham Stadium | 2012 Six Nations |
| 142 | 3 March 2012 | Ireland | 0 | 36 | Ashbourne RFC | 2012 Six Nations |
| 143 | 10 March 2012 | Italy | 30 | 13 | Millennium Stadium, Cardiff | 2012 Six Nations |
| 144 | 18 March 2012 | France | 0 | 31 | Cross Keys | 2012 Six Nations |
| 145 | 3 February 2013 | Ireland | 10 | 12 | Aberavon | 2013 Six Nations |
| 146 | 8 February 2013 | France | 0 | 32 | Stade Levindrey, Laon | 2013 Six Nations |
| 147 | 24 February 2013 | Italy | 16 | 15 | Benevento | 2013 Six Nations |
| 148 | 10 March 2013 | Scotland | 13 | 0 | Scotstoun, Glasgow | 2013 Six Nations |
| 149 | 17 March 2013 | England | 16 | 20 | Aberavon | 2013 Six Nations |
| 150 | 2 February 2014 | Italy | 11 | 12 | Talbot Athletic Ground | 2014 Six Nations |
| 151 | 7 February 2014 | Ireland | 6 | 18 | Ashbourne | 2014 Six Nations |
| 152 | 23 February 2014 | France | 0 | 27 | Talbot Athletic Ground | 2014 Six Nations |
| 153 | 7 March 2014 | England | 3 | 35 | Twickenham Stoop | 2014 Six Nations |
| 154 | 16 March 2014 | Scotland | 25 | 0 | Talbot Athletic Ground | 2014 Six Nations |
| 155 | 28 June 2014 | United States | 7 | 10 | Cross Keys | |
| 156 | 1 August 2014 | France | 0 | 26 | CNR, Marcoussis Pitch 1 | 2014 World Cup |
| 157 | 5 August 2014 | Australia | 3 | 25 | CNR, Marcoussis Pitch 2 | 2014 World Cup |
| 158 | 9 August 2014 | South Africa | 35 | 3 | CNR, Marcoussis Pitch 1 | 2014 World Cup |
| 159 | 13 August 2014 | New Zealand | 7 | 63 | CNR, Marcoussis Pitch 1 | 2014 World Cup |
| 160 | 17 August 2014 | Australia | 3 | 30 | CNR, Marcoussis Pitch 1 | 2014 World Cup |
| 161 | 6 February 2015 | England | 13 | 0 | St. Helen's, Swansea | 2015 Six Nations |
| 162 | 14 February 2015 | Scotland | 39 | 3 | Broadwood, Cumbernauld | 2015 Six Nations |
| 163 | 27 February 2015 | France | 7 | 28 | Stade Sapiac, Montauban | 2015 Six Nations |
| 164 | 15 March 2015 | Ireland | 0 | 20 | Swansea | 2015 Six Nations |
| 165 | 21 March 2015 | Italy | 5 | 23 | Stadio Plebiscito, Padova | 2015 Six Nations |
| 166 | 6 February 2016 | Ireland | 3 | 21 | Donnybrook, Dublin | 2016 Six Nations |
| 167 | 14 February 2016 | Scotland | 23 | 10 | The Gnoll, Neath | 2016 Six Nations |
| 168 | 28 February 2016 | France | 10 | 8 | The Gnoll, Neath | 2016 Six Nations |
| 169 | 12 March 2016 | England | 13 | 20 | Twickenham Stoop | 2016 Six Nations |
| 170 | 20 March 2016 | Italy | 12 | 16 | Athletic Ground, Port Talbot | 2016 Six Nations |
| 171 | 4 February 2017 | Italy | 20 | 8 | Stadio Carotti, Iesi | 2017 Six Nations |
| 172 | 11 February 2017 | England | 0 | 63 | Cardiff Arms Park | 2017 Six Nations |
| 173 | 24 February 2017 | Scotland | 14 | 15 | Broadwood, Cumbernauld | 2017 Six Nations |
| 174 | 11 March 2017 | Ireland | 7 | 12 | Cardiff Arms Park | 2017 Six Nations |
| 175 | 18 March 2017 | France | 19 | 39 | Brive-la-Gaillarde | 2017 Six Nations |
| 176 | 11 June 2017 | Japan | 10 | 52 | Ystrad Mynach | |
| 177 | 8 July 2017 | Spain | 26 | 21 | Cardiff | |
| 178 | 9 August 2017 | New Zealand | 12 | 44 | Billings Park UCD, Dublin | 2017 World Cup |
| 179 | 13 August 2017 | Canada | 0 | 15 | Billings Park UCD, Dublin | 2017 World Cup |
| 180 | 17 August 2017 | Hong Kong | 39 | 15 | UCD Bowl, Dublin | 2017 World Cup |
| 181 | 22 August 2017 | Canada | 0 | 52 | Queen's University Belfast | 2017 World Cup |
| 182 | 26 August 2017 | Ireland | 27 | 17 | Kingspan Stadium, Belfast | 2017 World Cup |
| 183 | 2 February 2018 | Scotland | 18 | 17 | Parc Eirias, Colwyn Bay | 2018 Six Nations |
| 184 | 10 February 2018 | England | 0 | 52 | Twickenham Stoop | 2018 Six Nations |
| 185 | 25 February 2018 | Ireland | 12 | 35 | Donnybrook, Dublin | 2018 Six Nations |
| 186 | 11 March 2018 | Italy | 15 | 22 | Cardiff Arms Park | 2018 Six Nations |
| 187 | 16 March 2018 | France | 3 | 38 | Parc Eirias, Colwyn Bay | 2018 Six Nations |
| 188 | 10 November 2018 | South Africa | 19 | 5 | Cardiff Arms Park | |
| 189 | 16 November 2018 | Hong Kong | 65 | 0 | Cardiff Arms Park | |
| 190 | 24 November 2018 | Canada | 21 | 38 | Cardiff Arms Park | |
| 191 | 2 February 2019 | France | 3 | 52 | Altrad Stadium, Montpellier | 2019 Six Nations |
| 192 | 9 February 2019 | Italy | 3 | 3 | Lecce | 2019 Six Nations |
| 193 | 24 February 2019 | England | 12 | 51 | Cardiff Arms Park | 2019 Six Nations |
| 194 | 8 March 2019 | Scotland | 17 | 15 | Scotstoun, Glasgow | 2019 Six Nations |
| 195 | 17 March 2019 | Ireland | 24 | 5 | Cardiff Arms Park | 2019 Six Nations |
| 196 | 3 November 2019 | Spain | 5 | 22 | Estadio Nacional Universidad Complutense, Madrid | |
| 197 | 10 November 2019 | Ireland | 15 | 13 | Donnybrook, Dublin | |
| 198 | 17 November 2019 | Scotland | 17 | 3 | Scotstoun, Glasgow | |

=== 2020–2021 ===
| Test | Date | Opponent | PF | PA | Venue | Event |
|---|---|---|---|---|---|---|
| 199 | 2 February 2020 | Italy | 15 | 19 | Cardiff Arms Park, Cardiff | 2020 Six Nations |
| 200 | 9 February 2020 | Ireland | 12 | 31 | Donnybrook Stadium, Dublin | 2020 Six Nations |
| 201 | 23 February 2020 | France | 0 | 50 | Cardiff Arms Park, Cardiff | 2020 Six Nations |
| 202 | 7 March 2020 | England | 7 | 66 | Twickenham Stoop, London | 2020 Six Nations |
| 203 | 3 April 2021 | France | 0 | 53 | Stade de la Rabine, Vannes | 2021 Six Nations |
| 204 | 10 April 2021 | Ireland | 0 | 45 | Cardiff Arms Park, Cardiff | 2021 Six Nations |
| 205 | 24 April 2021 | Scotland | 20 | 27 | Scotstoun Stadium, Glasgow | 2021 Six Nations |
| 206 | 7 November 2021 | Japan | 23 | 5 | Cardiff Arms Park, Cardiff | |
| 207 | 13 November 2021 | South Africa | 29 | 19 | Cardiff Arms Park, Cardiff | |
| 208 | 21 November 2021 | Canada | 7 | 24 | Cardiff Arms Park, Cardiff | |

=== 2022 ===
| Test | Date | Opponent | PF | PA | Venue | Event |
|---|---|---|---|---|---|---|
| 209 | 26 March 2022 | Ireland | 27 | 19 | RDS Arena, Dublin | 2022 Six Nations |
| 210 | 2 April 2022 | Scotland | 24 | 19 | Cardiff Arms Park, Cardiff | 2022 Six Nations |
| 211 | 9 April 2022 | England | 5 | 58 | Kingsholm Stadium, Gloucester | 2022 Six Nations |
| 212 | 22 April 2022 | France | 5 | 33 | Cardiff Arms Park, Cardiff | 2022 Six Nations |
| 213 | 30 April 2022 | Italy | 8 | 10 | Cardiff Arms Park, Cardiff | 2022 Six Nations |
| 214 | 27 August 2022 | Canada | 3 | 31 | Wanderers Grounds, Halifax | 2021 World Cup warm-up |
| 215 | 14 September 2022 | England | 7 | 73 | Ashton Gate, Bristol | 2021 World Cup warm-up |
| 216 | 9 October 2022 | Scotland | 18 | 15 | Okara Park, Whangārei | 2021 World Cup |
| 217 | 16 October 2022 | New Zealand | 12 | 56 | The Trusts Arena, Auckland | 2021 World Cup |
| 218 | 22 October 2022 | Australia | 17 | 13 | Okara Park, Whangārei | 2021 World Cup |
| 219 | 29 October 2022 | New Zealand | 3 | 55 | Okara Park, Whangārei | 2021 World Cup |

=== 2023 ===
| Test | Date | Opponent | PF | PA | Venue | Event |
|---|---|---|---|---|---|---|
| 220 | 25 March 2023 | Ireland | 31 | 5 | Cardiff Arms Park, Cardiff | 2023 Six Nations |
| 221 | 1 April 2023 | Scotland | 34 | 22 | Edinburgh Rugby Stadium, Edinburgh | 2023 Six Nations |
| 222 | 15 April 2023 | England | 3 | 59 | Cardiff Arms Park, Cardiff | 2023 Six Nations |
| 223 | 23 April 2023 | France | 14 | 39 | Stade des Alpes, Grenoble | 2023 Six Nations |
| 224 | 29 April 2023 | Italy | 36 | 10 | Stadio Sergio Lanfranchi, Parma | 2023 Six Nations |
| 225 | 30 September 2023 | United States | 38 | 18 | Eirias Park, Colwyn Bay | |
| 226 | 21 October 2023 | Canada | 22 | 42 | Wellington Regional Stadium, Wellington | 2023 WXV 1 |
| 227 | 28 October 2023 | New Zealand | 7 | 70 | Forsyth Barr Stadium, Dunedin | 2023 WXV 1 |
| 228 | 3 November 2023 | Australia | 19 | 25 | Mount Smart Stadium, Auckland | 2023 WXV 1 |

=== 2024 ===
| Test | Date | Opponent | PF | PA | Venue | Event |
|---|---|---|---|---|---|---|
| 229 | 23 March 2024 | Scotland | 18 | 20 | Cardiff Arms Park, Cardiff | 2024 Six Nations |
| 230 | 30 March 2024 | England | 10 | 46 | Ashton Gate, Bristol | 2024 Six Nations |
| 231 | 13 April 2024 | Ireland | 5 | 36 | Musgrave Park, Cork | 2024 Six Nations |
| 232 | 21 April 2024 | France | 0 | 40 | Cardiff Arms Park, Cardiff | 2024 Six Nations |
| 233 | 27 April 2024 | Italy | 22 | 20 | Millennium Stadium, Cardiff | 2024 Six Nations |
| 234 | 29 June 2024 | Spain | 52 | 20 | Cardiff Arms Park, Cardiff | 2024 WXV Qualifier |
| 235 | 6 September 2024 | Scotland | 14 | 40 | Hive Stadium, Edinburgh | |
| 236 | 20 September 2024 | Australia | 31 | 24 | Rodney Parade, Newport | |
| 237 | 28 September 2024 | Australia | 5 | 37 | DHL Stadium, Cape Town | 2024 WXV 2 |
| 238 | 5 October 2024 | Italy | 5 | 8 | Athlone Stadium, Cape Town | 2024 WXV 2 |
| 239 | 11 October 2024 | Japan | 19 | 10 | Athlone Stadium, Cape Town| | 2024 WXV 2 |

=== 2025 ===
| Test | Date | Opponent | F | A | Venue | Event |
|---|---|---|---|---|---|---|
| 240 | 22 March 2025 | Scotland | 21 | 24 | Edinburgh Rugby Stadium, Edinburgh | 2025 Six Nations |
| 241 | 29 March 2025 | England | 12 | 67 | Millennium Stadium, Cardiff | 2025 Six Nations |
| 242 | 12 April 2025 | France | 12 | 42 | Stade Amédée-Domenech, Brive-la-Gaillarde | 2025 Six Nations |
| 243 | 20 April 2025 | Ireland | 14 | 40 | Rodney Parade, Newport | 2025 Six Nations |
| 244 | 26 April 2025 | Italy | 12 | 44 | Stadio Sergio Lanfranchi, Parma | 2025 Six Nations |
| 245 | 26 July 2025 | Australia | 21 | 12 | Ballymore Stadium, Brisbane | 2025 World Cup Warm-Ups |
| 246 | 1 August 2025 | Australia | 5 | 36 | North Sydney Oval, Sydney | 2025 World Cup Warm-Ups |
| 247 | 23 August 2025 | Scotland | 8 | 38 | Salford Community Stadium, Manchester | 2025 World Cup |
| 248 | 30 August 2025 | Canada | 0 | 42 | Salford Community Stadium, Manchester | 2025 World Cup |
| 249 | 6 September 2025 | Fiji | 25 | 28 | Sandy Park, Exeter | 2025 World Cup |

=== 2026 ===
| Test | Date | Opponent | PF | PA | Venue | Event |
|---|---|---|---|---|---|---|
| 250 | 11 April 2026 | Scotland | 19 | 24 | Principality Stadium, Cardiff | 2026 Six Nations |
| 251 | 18 April 2026 | France | 7 | 38 | Cardiff Arms Park, Cardiff | 2026 Six Nations |
| 252 | 25 April 2026 | England | 24 | 62 | Ashton Gate, Bristol | 2026 Six Nations |
| 253 | 9 May 2026 | Ireland | 12 | 33 | Ravenhill Stadium, Belfast | 2026 Six Nations |
| 254 | 17 May 2026 | Italy | 24 | 43 | Cardiff Arms Park, Cardiff | 2026 Six Nations |
| 255 | 19 September 2026 | South Africa | 50 | 19 | Cardiff Arms Park, Cardiff | 2026 WXV Global Series |
| 256 | 26 September 2026 | United States | TBA | TBA | Cardiff Arms Park, Cardiff | 2026 WXV Global Series |
| 257 | 24 October 2026 | Japan | TBA | TBA | Prince Chichibu Memorial Stadium, Tokyo | 2026 WXV Global Series |
| 258 | 31 October 2026 | Japan | TBA | TBA | Kumagaya Rugby Ground, Kumagaya | 2026 WXV Global Series |

== Other matches ==
| Date | Wales | Score | Opponent | Venue |
|---|---|---|---|---|
| 21 October 1990 | Wales XV | 0–4 | Catalonia | Barcelona |
| 16 February 2002 | Wales A | 0–53 | England A | Bridgend |
| 24 March 2002 | Wales A | 0–79 | England A | London Welsh |
| 14 April 2002 | Wales A | 0–35 | England Academy | Chester |
| 23 March 2003 | Wales A | 22–12 | England Academy | Caerphilly |
| 29 March 2003 | Wales A | 25–5 | France A | Paris |
| 5 March 2004 | Wales A | 5–8 | France A | Llanrumney |
| 25 April 2004 | Wales A | 0–80 | England Academy | Broadstreet, Coventry |
| 8 December 2004 | Wales | 17–50 | England A | Clifton |
| 20 March 2005 | Wales A | 0–48 | England Academy | Birchgrove |
| 26 April 2005 | Wales A | 10–17 | South Africa | UWIC, Cardiff |
| 11 February 2006 | Wales A | 0–27 | Netherlands | Amsterdam |
| 2 May 2006 | Wales A | 7–66 | Canada | UWIC, Cardiff |
| 12 April 2009 | Welsh Invitational XV | 13–15 | Sweden | Sardis Road, Pontypridd |
| 1 August 2010 | Wales A | 15–13 | Ireland XV | Bridgend |
| 5 January 2013 | Wales A | 7–0 | Spain | National Centre of Excellence, Cardiff |
| 20 July 2014 | Wales | 7–27 | Ireland XV | Estuary Road, Malahide, Dublin, Ireland |
| 24 January 2016 | Wales XV | 15–5 | Ireland XV | Ystrad Mynach |
| 29 October 2016 | Wales XV | 15–0 | Scotland XV | Cardiff Arms Park |
| 11 November 2016 | Wales | 43–5 | British Army Women's XV | Cardiff Arms Park |
| 14 January 2017 | Wales XV | 39–0 | Spain XV | El Pantano, Villajoyosa |

== Notes ==
^a Wales only sent its development squad to the 2007 FIRA tournament.
