= WRU Division Five South East =

Welsh rugby union league

- Founded: 1995
- No. of teams: 11
- Country: Wales
- Most recent champion: Barry RFC (2009–10)
- Level on pyramid: 6
- Promotion to: WRU Division Four South East, WRU Division Four South West
- Relegation to: WRU Division Six Central
- Website: www.wru.co.uk/1159_2112.php

The Welsh Rugby Union Division Five South East (also called the SWALEC Division Five South East for sponsorship reasons) is a rugby union league in Wales first implemented for the 1995/96 season.

== Competition format and sponsorship ==
=== Competition ===
There are 11 clubs in the WRU Division Five South East. During the course of a season (which lasts from September to May) each club plays the others twice, once at their home ground and once at that of their opponents for a total of 20 games for each club, with a total of 110 games in each season. Teams receive four points for a win and two point for a draw, an additional bonus point is awarded to either team if they score four tries or more in a single match. No points are awarded for a loss though the losing team can gain a bonus point for finishing the match within seven points of the winning team. Teams are ranked by total points, then the number of tries scored and then points difference. At the end of each season, the club with the most points is crowned as champion. If points are equal the tries scored then points difference determines the winner. The team who is declared champion at the end of the season is eligible for promotion to the WRU Division Four South. The two lowest placed teams are relegated into the WRU Division Six Central.

=== Sponsorship ===
In 2008 the Welsh Rugby Union announced a new sponsorship deal for the club rugby leagues with SWALEC valued at £1 million (GBP). The initial three year sponsorship was extended at the end of the 2010/11 season, making SWALEC the league sponsors until 2015. The leagues sponsored are the WRU Divisions one through to seven.

- (2002-2005) Lloyds TSB
- (2005-2008) Asda
- (2008-2015) SWALEC

== 2010/2011 season ==
=== League teams ===
- Canton RFC
- Cefn Coed RFC
- Cilfynydd RFC
- Cowbridge RFC
- Deri RFC
- Dinas Powys RFC
- Ferndale RFC
- Old Illtydians RFC
- Old Penarthians RFC
- Penygraig RFC
- St. Albans RFC
- Wattstown RFC

== 2009/2010 season ==
=== League teams ===
- Barry RFC
- Blackwood Stars RFC
- Canton RFC
- Cilfynydd RFC
- Cefn Coed RFC
- Cowbridge RFC
- Deri RFC
- Dinas Powys RFC
- Old Penarthians RFC
- Penygraig RFC
- Senghenydd RFC
- St. Albans RFC

=== League table ===
2009-2010 WRU Division Five South East League Table
Club	Played	Won	Drawn	Lost	Points for	Points against	Tries for	Tries against	Try bonus	Losing bonus	Points
Barry RFC	22	21	0	1	811	157	109	16	16	1	101
Senghenydd RFC	22	20	1	1	1013	148	150	19	17	1	100
Blackwood Stars RFC	22	16	3	3	622	337	94	41	14	0	84
Penygraig RFC	22	16	0	6	595	296	88	37	13	0	77
Deri RFC	22	10	1	11	548	583	80	72	9	0	51
Cefn Coed RFC	22	9	1	12	338	445	45	55	3	4	45
Old Penarthians RFC	22	7	2	13	329	523	35	74	3	3	38
Cilfynydd RFC	22	8	0	14	268	590	32	78	1	2	35
St. Albans RFC	22	6	0	16	258	739	31	107	1	6	31
Cowbridge RFC	22	6	1	15	309	636	36	96	3	1	30
Canton RFC	22	4	1	17	305	581	38	84	2	2	22
Dinas Powys RFC	22	3	2	17	224	585	25	84	0	5	21
Correct as of 18:13 4 August 2010

== 2008/2009 season ==
=== League teams ===
- Barry RFC
- Canton RFC
- Cilfynydd RFC
- Cowbridge RFC
- Deri RFC
- Dinas Powys RFC
- Hirwaun RFC
- Old Penarthians RFC
- Penygraig RFC
- Pontyclun RFC
- St. Albans RFC

=== League table ===
2008-2009 WRU Division Five South East League Table
Club	Played	Won	Drawn	Lost	Points for	Points against	Tries for	Tries against	Try bonus	Losing bonus	Points
Pontyclun RFC	20	18	0	2	694	191	104	21	12	2	86
Cilfynydd RFC	20	15	1	4	635	330	90	37	10	2	74
Barry RFC	20	13	2	5	515	247	64	30	5	2	63
St. Albans RFC	20	11	0	9	504	347	68	40	7	4	55
Deri RFC	20	11	0	9	409	349	55	45	5	3	52
Hirwaun RFC	20	11	1	8	476	421	59	57	7	2	51
Penygraig RFC	20	9	1	10	283	405	41	51	4	1	43
Cowbridge RFC	20	7	1	12	337	369	33	46	3	4	37
Old Penarthians RFC	20	7	0	13	318	431	39	61	2	3	33
Dinas Powys RFC	20	3	0	17	291	701	44	105	4	3	19
Canton RFC	20	2	0	18	157	828	19	123	1	1	10
Correct as of 18:13 19 June 2009

== 2007/2008 season ==
=== League table ===
- Canton RFC
- Cowbridge RFC
- Deri RFC
- Dinas Powys RFC
- Ogmore Vale RFC
- Old Penarthians RFC
- Penygraig RFC
- Pontyclun RFC
- Porth Harlequins RFC
- St. Albans RFC
- St. Joseph's RFC

=== League table ===
2007-2008 WRU Division Five South East League Table
Club	Played	Won	Drawn	Lost	Points for	Points against	Tries for	Tries against	Try bonus	Losing bonus	Points
Porth Harlequins RFC	20	17	0	3	642	173	100	19	12	2	82
St. Joseph's RFC	20	17	0	3	503	179	69	17	9	3	80
Pontyclun RFC	20	14	1	5	468	218	66	24	7	2	67
Deri RFC	20	14	0	6	476	285	65	33	7	3	66
St. Albans RFC	20	11	0	9	402	423	58	61	7	1	52
Cowbridge RFC	20	8	0	12	329	379	37	54	3	7	42
Old Penarthians RFC	20	9	0	11	231	369	29	53	2	3	41
Penygraig RFC	20	6	1	13	260	436	30	63	2	5	33
Ogmore Vale RFC	20	6	0	14	208	475	27	71	2	3	29
Canton RFC	20	4	0	16	248	499	34	67	3	6	25
Dinas Powys RFC	20	3	0	17	161	492	20	73	1	1	14
Correct as of 18:13 26 May 2008
