= HSOB =

HSOB may refer to one of many things:

- El Obeid Airport, in Sudan, has the ICAO code HSOB
- High School Old Boys the name of many sporting and alumni organisations, among them:
  - Cardiff HSOB RFC, a Welsh rugby union club
  - Christchurch High School Old Boys, a New Zealand football club
  - Douglas High School Old Boys A.F.C., a Manx football club
  - Dunedin High School Old Boys, a defunct New Zealand football club
  - High School Old Boys RFC, a New Zealand rugby union club
  - Invercargill High School Old Boys, a defunct New Zealand football club
  - Melbourne High School Old Boys Association, an Australian sporting and alumni organisation
  - Napier High School Old Boys, a defunct New Zealand football club
  - Newport HSOB RFC, a Welsh rugby union club
