= Garfield Owen =

Wales dual-code rugby international footballer (1932–2019)

Personal information
- Full name: Garfield David Owen
- Born: 20 March 1932 Llanharan, Rhondda Cynon Taf, Wales
- Died: 17 January 2019 (aged 86)

Playing information

Rugby union
- Position: Fullback
Club
Years	Team	Pld	T	G	FG	P
	Llanharan RFC
	Maesteg RFC
	Wrexham RFC
1954–56	Newport RFC
	Total	0	0	0	0	0
Representative
Years	Team	Pld	T	G	FG	P
1955–56	Barbarians
1955–56	Wales	6				26

Rugby league
- Position: Fullback
Club
Years	Team	Pld	T	G	FG	P
1956–61	Halifax	166	4	535	0	1082
1961–65	Keighley	127				705
	Total	293	4	535	0	1787
Representative
Years	Team	Pld	T	G	FG	P
1958	Rugby League XIII	1	0	5	0	10
1959	Wales	1	0	1	0	2

Garfield David Owen (20 Mar 1932 – 17 Jan 2019) was a Welsh teacher, and dual-code international rugby union, and professional rugby league footballer who played in the 1950s and 1960s. He first played amateur rugby for Llanharan RFC, Maesteg RFC, Wrexham RFC and Newport RFC at club level before winning six caps for Wales. He also played rugby union for the invitational club; Barbarian F.C. He later switched to the professional code in 1956 joining Halifax where at international level he also played for the Rugby League XIII, and the Wales rugby league team at his favoured position of fullback.

== International honours ==
Owen represented Rugby League XIII while at Halifax in 1958, and represented Wales while at Halifax in 1959.

== Honoured at Halifax ==
Owen is a Halifax Hall Of Fame Inductee.

== Career records ==
Owen is one of fewer than twenty-five Welshmen to have scored more than 1000 points in their rugby league career.

== Personal life ==
Owen married Marlene (née Sternson) in 1957 in Surrey. They had two children; Russell H. Owen and Sally L. Owen.

His death was announced on 17 January 2019, he was 86-years-old.
