= Daniel Pascoe =

Wales international rugby union & league footballer

Personal information
- Full name: Daniel Pascoe
- Born: 7 July 1900 Llanharan, Wales
- Died: 19 May 1971 (aged 70) Leeds, England

Playing information

Rugby union
- Position: Flanker
Club
Years	Team	Pld	T	G	FG	P
	Llanharan RFC
≤1923–≥1924	Bridgend RFC
≤1926–1927	Neath RFC
	Total	0	0	0	0	0
Representative
Years	Team	Pld	T	G	FG	P
1923	Wales	2	0	0	0	0

Rugby league
Club
Years	Team	Pld	T	G	FG	P
1927–30	Leeds	141	29	80	0	247
	York
	Total	141	29	80	0	247

Daniel "Dan" Pascoe (7 July 1900 – 19 May 1971) born in Llanharan, was a Welsh rugby union, and professional rugby league footballer who played in the 1920s. He played representative level rugby union (RU) for Wales, and at club level for Bridgend RFC and Neath RFC, captaining both, as a flanker, and club level rugby league (RL) for Leeds. He died in Leeds.

== Club career ==
Pascoe was transferred from Leeds to York during the 1930–31 season.

== International honours ==
Dan Pascoe won caps for Wales (RU) while at Bridgend RFC in 1923 against France, and Ireland.
