= Coychurch Higher =

Coychurch Higher: Welsh: Llangrallo Uchaf
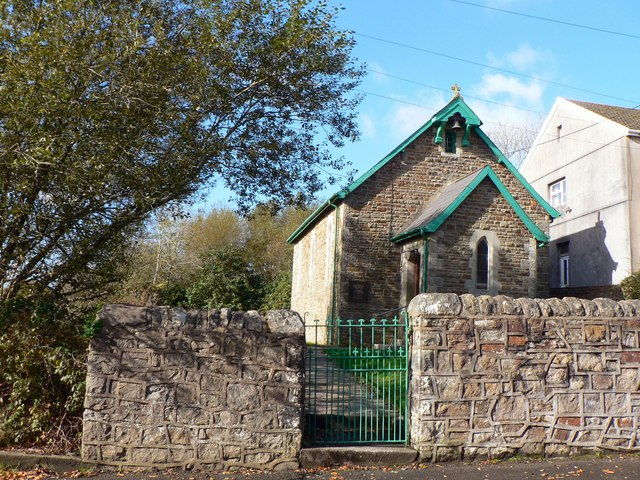
- St Paul's Church, Heol-y-Cyw

- Location within Bridgend
- Population: 888
- OS grid reference: SS945846
- Community: Coychurch Higher
- Principal area: Bridgend
- Preserved county: Mid Glamorgan
- Country: Wales
- Sovereign state: United Kingdom
- Post town: BRIDGEND
- Postcode district: CF35
- Dialling code: 01656
- Police: South Wales
- Fire: South Wales
- Ambulance: Welsh
- UK Parliament: Bridgend
- Senedd Cymru – Welsh Parliament: Bridgend
- List of places UK Wales Bridgend 51.550951°N 3.521553°W Map of the community

Coychurch Higher (Welsh: Llangrallo Uchaf) is a community in Bridgend County Borough, south Wales. It covers the westerly area of the county north of Pencoed and south of Ogmore Vale. The community is sparsely populated and contains only one settlement, the small village of Heol-y-Cyw, which is located on the southerly border of the community. The majority of the community is made up of hilly terrain populated by several farm houses. It was once the site of Wern Tarw Colliery, the site of the first major coalminers' strike post-nationalisation of the coal industry. The population of the community in 2011 was 888.

== Buildings of note ==
The largest industry in the history of the area was the Wern Tarw Colliery. First opened in 1915 as a drift mine by Meiros Colleries, a deep pit was later added and by 1938 over 400 men were employed at the site. By 1945 the drift and pit, along with workers at the Hafod Seam, employed 700 miners. In 1951, a decision by the National Coal Board to move 87 workers to the nearby Llanharan Colliery, resulted in the first major coalminer's strike since the nationalisation of the industry. The colliery closed in 1964.

A major employer in the community is Rockwool, whose factory and chimney stacks at the site of Wern Tarw dominates the area.

St Paul's church, on the High Street of Heol-y-Cyw, is the largest religious building in the community. Built in 1889, after a local cottage used for services could no longer accommodate the growing congregation, the church was funded by a £50 grant from the Bishop of Llandaff. The church organ, purchased second-hand in 1909 and restored in 1992, is believed to be over 150 years old.

== Sport and leisure ==
Coychurch higher is home to rugby union club Heol y Cyw RFC, whose ground is also used by Australian Rules team, the Bridgend Eagles.
