= Pontyclun RFC =

Welsh rugby union club, based in Pontyclun

(Wales) Pontyclun RFC
- Full name: Pontyclun Rugby & Sports Club
- Nickname(s): The Badgers; The Falcons (Woman's Senior Team)
- Founded: 1887
- Location: Pontyclun, Wales
- Ground: Windsor Fields
- League: WRU Division 3A South East
Team kit

Official website
- pontyclun.rfc.wales

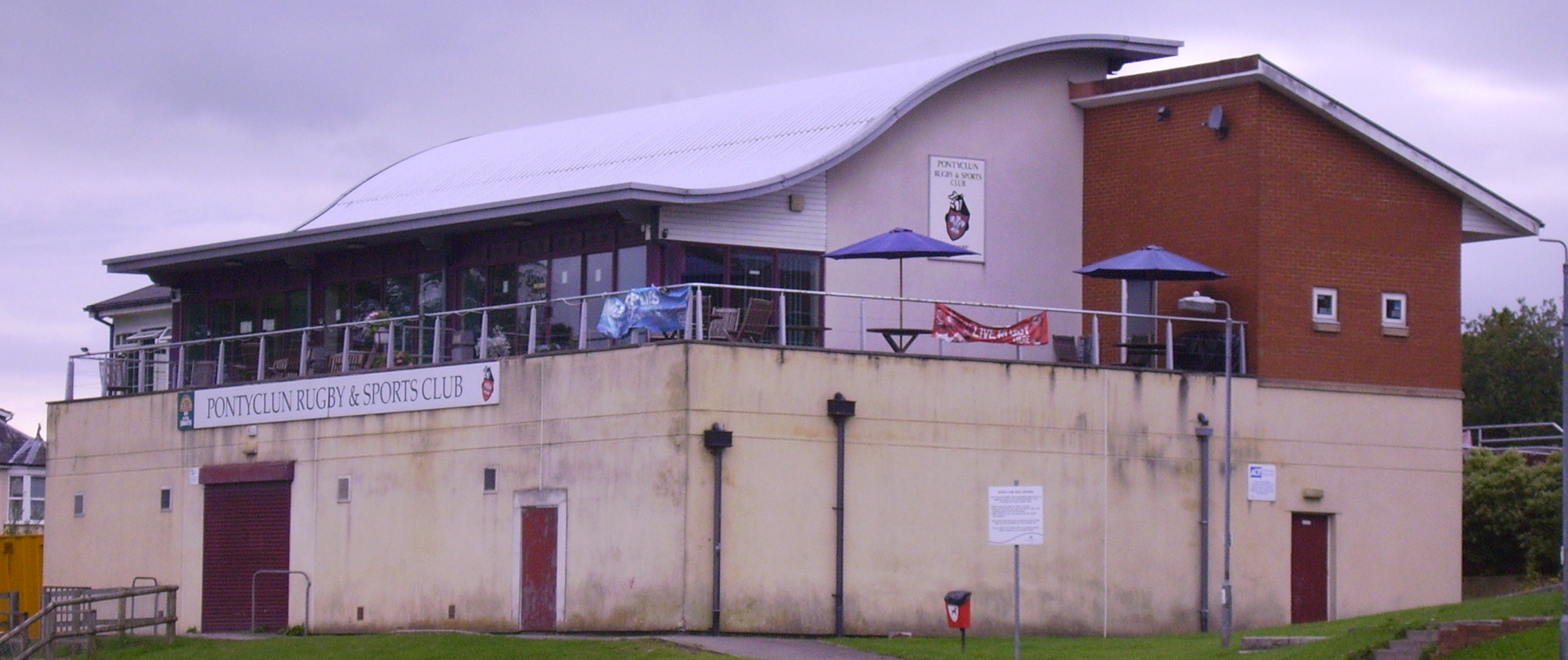
Pontyclun RFC club house

Pontyclun Rugby Football Club is a Welsh rugby union team based in Pontyclun, Wales. Pontyclun RFC is a member of the Welsh Rugby Union.

== History ==
Although it is believed that rugby had been played in Pontyclun from the early 1880s; a game between a team from Pontyclun and Pentyrch was called off after crowd trouble in 1884, it is thought the rugby club was not created until 1886. The club accepts its creation date as 1887 as proof that Pontyclun played as a RFC during the 1887/88 season, recorded in the Pontypridd Chronicle on 11 November 1887. The match was recorded as Pontypridd Juniors against Pontyclown (a common misspelling of the town during the late 1800s) which Pontyclun won. There is also a report in the South Wales Daily News for 12 November 1888 of a match between Bridgend and Pontyclown which was news-worthy due to Pontyclun taking offence at the referee, resulting in the team leaving the pitch eight minutes before the end of the match.

In September 1887 Pontyclun RFC applied for membership to the Welsh Rugby Union along with Llandovery, Chepstow and Brecon. The membership was granted in a meeting held at the Queen's Hotel in Cardiff later that year. Unfortunately for Pontyclun in 1886 the WRU appointed a new secretary, Walter E. Rees, and he brought an element of financial stability to an organisation that was once wasteful. Where clubs were once able to miss membership subscription fees with little reprise, Rees ensured that this was no longer the case and Pontylcun lost their WRU membership in 1888 due to missed subscriptions.

Pontyclun RFC re-applied for Welsh Rugby Union membership in 1919 along with Llanharan and Taffs Well. All three clubs were awarded membership on 22 August of that year, but were told to "put your grounds in order".

The club first played on a field which is now the site of local school, Y Pant School (Ysgol y Pant); until moving to Mill Fields.

Pontyclun was one of the first sides to play mini’s rugby in Wales when they starter in 1971.

In September 1971 the club held a match to celebrate the club's 75^{th} anniversary. Clive Rowlands led a Presidents XV full of Welsh internationals to a game here to commemorate this honour

The new clubhouse opened on 30^{th} March 1980. That same season, 1980/81 Cliff Jones, the President of Pontyclun RFC became President of the WRU. This was the first time anyone held these two positions at the same time.

== Falcons ==
The falcons were formed in 1998 and are one of the longest running Women's team in Wales. They currently play in the Welsh premiership and were league winners for the 2015 / 2016 & 2018 / 2019 seasons. They have been Super Cup Finalists in 2001, 2004, 2007, 2011, 2014, 2015 & 2019 and were winners of the Plate in 2009. Several players have represented Wales at senior level including Gem Hallett, Laura Prosser, Cerys Hale, Rafiuke Taylor, Vicky Owens, Mel Clay, Lisa Newton, Georgia Evans & Megan Webb

== Notable former players ==
- (Wales) Tommy Rees (4 caps)
- (Wales) Cliff Jones (13 caps)
- (Wales) Gemma Hallett (35 caps)
- (Wales) Cerys Hale (38 caps)
- (Wales) Georgia Evans (43 caps)
- (Wales) Megan Webb (8 caps)
- (Wales) Harri Deaves (2 caps)
- (Wales) Jarrod Evans (17 caps)

== Club honours ==
- 2008/09 WRU Division Five South East - Champions

== Bibliography ==
- David, John (1987). Hard Kicks but Good Touches - A Celebration of 100 years of Rugby at Pontyclun R.F.C. 1887-1987. ISBN 0-905928-77-6.
