= Tylorstown RFC =

Welsh rugby union club, based in Tylerstown

(Wales) Tylorstown RFC
- Full name: Tylorstown Rugby Football Club
- Nickname: The Tigers
- Founded: 1903; 123 years ago
- Location: Tylorstown, Wales
- Ground: Penrhys Park
- President: T.T. Williams
- Coach(es): David Hefford (Forwards), Gareth Turner (Backs), Robert Hemming (Assistant), Craig Miles (Team manager)
- League: East Central Division 4
- 2024 - 2025: 4th
Team kit

Official website
- www.tylorstown.rfc.wales

Tylorstown Rugby Football Club is a rugby union team from the village of Tylorstown, Wales. The club is a member of the Welsh Rugby Union and is a feeder club for the Cardiff Blues.

It is believed that rugby was played in Tylorstown from 1895, but it was not until 1903 that the club played under the name Tylorstown RFC. The first written publication of Tylorstown RFC playing was a match report in the Western Mail on 27 February 1905, in which the team played and lost against local Rhondda team, Llwynypia. Tylostown RFC applied for and gained membership of the Welsh Rugby Union in 1937. The club has disbanded twice in their history, during both World Wars.

The team's nickname, the Tigers, comes from their team strip which is amber and black hoops. In the 2013-2014 season, the under 15s team wore a tiger print kit on their tour of the Netherlands.

== Notable former players ==
- (Wales) John Bevan (10 caps)
- (Wales) Gordon Wells (7 caps)
- (Wales) Howard Norris (2caps)

== Club honours ==
- WRU Division Three South East 2009/10 - Champions
- WRU Division Three B South East Central 2017/18 - Champions
