= Llandaff North RFC =

(Wales) Llandaff North RFC
- Full name: Llandaff North Rugby Football Club
- Location: Llandaff North, Wales
- Ground: Hailey Park
- Chairman: Mike Edmonds
- Coach: Gav Lucas/ Daniel Thomas
- League: WRU Division Four South East
- 2011/12: 10th
Team kit

Official website
- www.llandaffnorth.com

Llandaff North Rugby Football Club are a Welsh rugby union club based in Llandaff North, Cardiff in South Wales. The club is a member of the Welsh Rugby Union and is a feeder club for the Cardiff Blues.

They presently play in the WRU Division Three South East, having moved from Division Four South East in the 2007/08 season after winning first place in the league.

== Club honours ==
- WRU Division Four South East 2007/08 – Champions
