= Heol-y-Cyw =

Coordinates: 51.550951°N 3.521553°W

Heol-y-Cyw: Welsh: Heol-y-Cyw
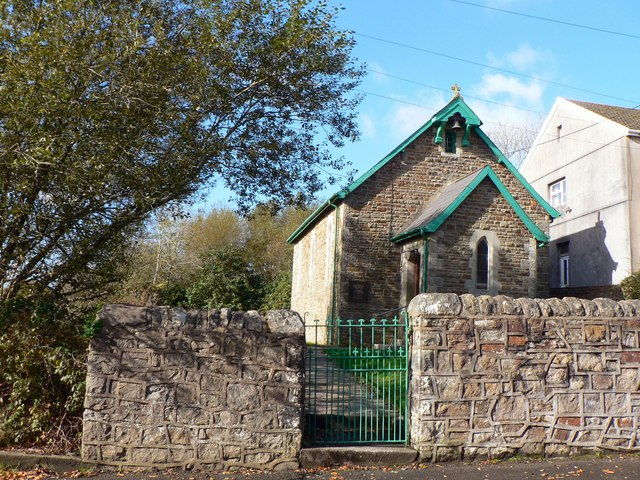
- St Paul's Church, Heol-y-Cyw

- Location within Bridgend
- OS grid reference: SS945846
- Community: Coychurch Higher
- Principal area: Bridgend
- Preserved county: Mid Glamorgan
- Country: Wales
- Sovereign state: United Kingdom
- Post town: BRIDGEND
- Postcode district: CF35
- Dialling code: 01656
- Police: South Wales
- Fire: South Wales
- Ambulance: Welsh
- UK Parliament: Bridgend
- Senedd Cymru – Welsh Parliament: Bridgend

Heol-y-Cyw is a little village in Bridgend County Borough, Wales, located near Bridgend, in the community of Coychurch Higher. The village, and its surroundings, had a population of 538 in 2011 census.

== Amenities ==
Heol-y-Cyw has one Nonconformist chapel, an Anglican church, a working men's club, and two pubs.

The local rugby club, Heol y Cyw RFC celebrated its 100th anniversary in 2005. As a part of the celebrations, a book recording the village and rugby club was published in 2005.
