= Tommy Rees (rugby) =

GB rugby league & Wales rugby union international footballer

Personal information
- Full name: Thomas Edgar Rees
- Born: 22 August 1904 Pontyclun, Wales
- Died: 10 November 1968 (aged 64) Oldham, England

Playing information

Rugby union
- Position: Fullback
Club
Years	Team	Pld	T	G	FG	P
	Pontyclun RFC
	Crawshays RFC
	Army XV
192?–28	London Welsh RFC
	Total	0	0	0	0	0
Representative
Years	Team	Pld	T	G	FG	P
1926–28	Wales	4				4

Rugby league
- Position: Fullback
Club
Years	Team	Pld	T	G	FG	P
1928–39	Oldham	417	8	659	0	1342
1939	Broughton Rangers					117
	Total	417	8	659	0	1459
Representative
Years	Team	Pld	T	G	FG	P
1929	Great Britain	1	0	0	0	0

Thomas Edgar Rees (22 August 1904 – 10 November 1968) was a Welsh rugby union, and professional rugby league footballer who played in the 1920s and 1930s. He played representative level rugby union (RU) for Wales, and at club level for Pontyclun RFC, Crawshays RFC, Army XV and London Welsh RFC, as a fullback and representative level rugby league (RL) for Great Britain, and at club level for Oldham and Broughton Rangers as a fullback.

== Background ==
Tommy Rees was born in Pontyclun, Wales, and he died aged 64 in Oldham, Lancashire, England.

== Rugby union career ==
Rees was born in Pontyclun in South Wales and as a teenager played rugby for local club team Pontyclun RFC. Jack Meggins, a local headmaster from Talbot Green, saw potential in Rees and recommended him in writing to invitational team Crawshays. Crawshays accepted Rees, the first notable team in his career. Rees joined the British Army and became a soldier in the Welsh Guards, and while serving in the Guards he was selected for the Army XV.

In 1926, Rees was playing for Welsh exile team London Welsh, and after an excellent victory against Cross Keys at Blackheath on 6 March, Rees along with teammates Windsor Lewis and Wick Powell, was selected to face Ireland as part of the 1926 Five Nations Championship. The game was played at St. Helen's, Swansea, with the Welsh team being led by Swansea's Rowe Harding. The Wales team were victorious over Ireland, robbing the Irish of both the Triple Crown and Grand Slam. Rees scored his first international points during the game with a single conversion, and at the end of the match, the three London Welsh players were carried from the pitch shoulder-high. The press recorded that Rees had "a great game that caused intense enthusiasm". Rees was reselected for the next Wales international, the final game of the 1926 tournament, away to France. Now captained by Bobby Delahay, Wales won the game 7–5.

On Christmas Eve 1926, Rees was playing for London Welsh away to Cross Keys. In the first few minutes of the second half, while attempting a tackle, Rees broke his leg. Rees had been a certainty for the 1927 Championship, and after his injury his place was taken by Ossie Male. The next season, Rees was back in the Wales team, and was chosen to face the New South Wales Waratahs at the Cardiff Arms Park. Wales were well beaten, though Rees scored for Wales with another conversion. The selectors kept faith with Rees, and he played his final union international in the opening game of the 1928 tournament, played at Swansea against England.

=== International matches played ===
Wales (rugby union)

- England 1928
- France 1926
- Ireland 1926
- (Australia) New South Wales Waratahs 1927

== Rugby league career ==
He played at representative level for Great Britain, and at club level for Oldham and Broughton Rangers, as a fullback. In 1928 while only 23, Rees decide to switch to the professional league code, and 'Went North', joining Oldham RLFC. Rees had an eleven-year career with Oldham setting many club records, including kicking 668 goals and playing 121 consecutive first team games. In 1939, towards the end of his club career, Rees joined Broughton Rangers though the outbreak of the Second World War ended the playing of professional rugby. He continued to be involved in rugby after his retirement, becoming a rugby league referee. In 1947 he became a rugby league referee and later ran the line as a touch judge in the final of the Rugby League Challenge Cup at Wembley. He was a lifelong committee man, and served Oldham until ill-health forced his retirement. Tommy Rees is one of less than twenty-five Welshmen to have scored more than 1000-points in their rugby league career. Tom Rees won a single cap for Great Britain while at Oldham in 1929 against Australia.

== Bibliography ==
- David, John (1987). Hard Kicks but Good Touches - A Celebration of 100 years of Rugby at Pontyclun R.F.C. 1887-1987. D. Brown & Sons. ISBN 0-905928-77-6.
- Jones, Stephen; Paul Beken (1985). Dragon in Exile, The Centenary History of London Welsh R.F.C. London: Springwood Books. ISBN 0-86254-125-5.
- Smith, David; Williams, Gareth (1980). Fields of Praise: The Official History of The Welsh Rugby Union. Cardiff: University of Wales Press. ISBN 0-7083-0766-3.
