= Wendy Davis (rugby union) =

Wales international rugby union footballer

William Edward Davies Davis
- Born: William Edward Norman Davis; 7 September 1913 Birmingham, England
- Died: c. 2002 (aged 88–89) Cirencester, England
- School: Camp Hill School for Boys, Cardiff High School

Rugby union career
- Position: Prop
Amateur team(s)
Years	Team	Apps	(Points)
1934–1939	Cardiff RFC	119	
- Penarth RFC
- Cardiff High School Old Boys
1939–1943	Barbarian F.C.	5	
–	Army		
International career
Years	Team	Apps	(Points)
1939-1939	Wales	3	(0)

William Edward Norman Davis better known as Wendy Davis (7 September 1913 – c. 2002) was an international rugby union prop who represented Wales on three occasions and played club rugby for Cardiff. His international rugby career was curtailed by the outbreak of the Second World War but he continued to play as part of the British Army team.

== Personal history ==
Davis was born in Birmingham, England, in 1913. He was educated at Camp Hill School for Boys in Birmingham, and then at Cardiff High School. He ran a tannery. With the outbreak of the Second World War Davis joined the British Army. The Who's Who of Welsh International Rugby Players states that Davis served in the Royal Artillery, but The London Gazette in 1940 lists him in the Royal Welch Fusiliers. In retirement Davis moved to Cirencester where he died circa 2002.

== Rugby career ==
Davis played rugby for both Camp Hill and Cardiff High while a youth. He joined Cardiff RFC during the 1934–35 season and remained at the club until the outbreak of war. He played 119 matches for Cardiff receiving his First XV cap during the 1934–35 season when he represented the club 15 times. In the 1938–39 season, he was Cardiff's vice captain, under Wilf Wooler. As well as Cardiff, Davis also played for local rivals Penarth RFC and Cardiff High School Old Boys.

In 1939 Davis was selected to play for his first international match for Wales. His inaugural game was against England in the 1939 Home Nations Championship. Although Wales lost the opening game, Davis was on the winning side for both of the tournament's remaining matches against Scotland and Ireland. Although the outbreak of the Second World War brought a close to international rugby, Davis continued to play, most often in charity war matches. In 1940 was chosen to represent the British Army, playing against France, and scored a rare try in a heavy 36–3 victory over the French. As well as the Army team, Davis also played for touring invitational team the Barbarians. His first match for the Barbarians was before the war, playing against the East Midlands county team. He would play a further four matches for the team, all wartime charity matches between 1941 and 1943, against Thorneloe's XV (named after Leicester secretary J.E. Thorneloe who organised the games). After retiring from playing rugby Davis worked as a summariser for the Welsh Home Service during the 1950s.

=== International matches played ===
Wales

- England 1939
- Ireland 1939
- Scotland 1939

== Bibliography ==
- Davies, D.E. (1975). Cardiff Rugby Club, History and Statistics 1876–1975. Risca: The Starling Press. ISBN 0950442100.
- Smith, David; Williams, Gareth (1980). Fields of Praise: The Official History of The Welsh Rugby Union. Cardiff: University of Wales Press. ISBN 0-7083-0766-3.
