= Ian Evans (rugby union) =

British Lions & Wales international rugby union footballer

- Born: Ian Richard Evans; 4 October 1984 (age 42) Johannesburg, South Africa
- Height: 6 ft 8 in (2.04 m)
- Weight: 18 st 6 lb (117 kg)
- School: Blaengwawr Comprehensive School

Rugby union career
- Position: Lock
Amateur team(s)
Years	Team	Apps	(Points)
- Abercwmboi RFC
Senior career
Years	Team	Apps	(Points)
2005–2014	Ospreys	129	(15)
2014–2017	Bristol	29	(0)
- Correct as of 18 January 2015
International career
Years	Team	Apps	(Points)
2006–2016	Wales	33	(5)
2013	British & Irish Lions	0	(0)

Ian Evans (born 4 October 1984) is a former Wales international rugby union player He was part of the coaching staff of the Dragons RFC, joining in 2018, until his departure in January 2020.

Evans was born in Johannesburg, South Africa. He was brought up in Aberdare, and began playing his rugby at Abercwmboi RFC and then moved to Pontypridd RFC once he was eligible for senior rugby. He quickly made his mark upon Wales' Age-Grade selectors with a succession of athletic and promising performances for the Valleys' team. Joining up with Swansea RFC in 2004, he progressed through the internal system to play for the Ospreys in the Celtic League and Heineken Cup, and has played for the national team. His usual position was at lock. He was the tallest member of the national team at 2.03 meters, but has since been demoted to 2nd tallest with the inclusion of Luke Charteris.

He represented Wales at both under-19 and under-21 levels. Evans made his Celtic League debut against Munster as a replacement in September 2005. He also made his Heineken Cup debut against Leicester. He made his debut for Wales in June 2004, playing in two Tests against Argentina, scoring a try in the first game. Evans then went on to start 3 of Wales' 4 matches in the 2006 Autumn internationals including the match against New Zealand. He was due to make his comeback from long-term injury versus the Pumas in a World Cup warm-up game in Cardiff but suffered a further setback, damaging his collar bone.

After an impressive 2013 Six Nations Championship, where Evans played an important role in Wales' second successive title, he was selected for the 2013 British & Irish Lions tour to Australia. However he would not feature in any of the Lions test matches. Evans missed the 2014 Six Nations Championship through suspension after the lock stamped on Leinster's Mike McCarthy in a Heineken cup game.

On 27 November 2013, Evans initially signed a three-year contract to join top French team Toulon in the Top 14. However, the deal fell through and instead he signed for English club Bristol Rugby, despite Bristol competing in the RFU Championship. Ian was appointed Treorchy RFC first team coach along with Andrew Bishop for the 2016/2017 season and also for 2017/2018 season.

In 2017, Evans retired due to an injury and upon medical advice from his Doctor. Evans recently coached his home club Abercwmboi RFC.
