= Cerys Hale =

Welsh rugby union player

- Born: 4 April 1993 (age 33) Newport, South Wales
- Height: 1.75 m (5.7 ft)
- Weight: 90.91 kg (14.316 st)
- University: Cardiff Metropolitan

Rugby union career
- Position: Prop
- Current team: Gloucester-Hartpury
Amateur team(s)
Years	Team	Apps	(Points)
- Newport High School Old Boys
Senior career
Years	Team	Apps	(Points)
2019-present	Gloucester-Hartpury		
–	Pontyclun RFC		
International career
Years	Team	Apps	(Points)
2016–present	Wales	38	
- Correct as of 29 April 2021

Cerys Hale (born 4 April 1993) is a Welsh Rugby Union professional player who plays prop for the Wales women's national rugby union team and Gloucester-Hartpury. She made her debut for Wales in 2016 and represented them at the 2021 Women's Six Nations Championship.

== Club career ==
Hale started playing rugby at the age of 11 with the Newport High School Old Boys, remaining with the club until she was 18. During this time she also played for WRU regional team, the Dragons.

Between 2016 and 2018 Hale played prop for Pontyclun RFC, before moving to her current club, Gloucester-Hartpury.

== International career ==
Hale was called up to the Wales women's squad for both the 2014 Women's Rugby World Cup and the 2014 Women's Six Nations Championship, but didn't gain any game time for either. She was the only member of the Wales squad not to gain any game time during the World Cup tournament and was not selected for the 2015 Women's Six Nations Championship.

Missing out on these opportunities pushed Hale to work on her game. In a subsequent WRU interview, she said: "Obviously not getting on in the World Cup and not making [the 2015] Six Nations squad really drove me to work on my skills work and on my conditioning".

After waiting patiently for two years, she gained her first cap during the 2016 Women's Six Nations Championship when she was brought on as a substitute in the match against Ireland. She then made three appearances in the 2017 Women's Rugby World Cup.

Most recently, Hale represented Wales at the 2021 Women's Six Nations Championship, telling the BBC: "I want to not just be the best prop in Wales but to be the best prop in the UK."

Hale has won 38 caps in her career to date. She was selected in Wales squad for the 2021 Rugby World Cup in New Zealand.

== Personal life ==
As a child, Hale attended Ysgol Gyfun Gwynllyw, a Welsh-language comprehensive school located in Pontypool in Torfaen, Wales. She then studied at Cardiff Metropolitan University, where she graduated in 2014 with a degree in sports development.

Since 2016 Hale has taught at schools around South Wales, first as a science teacher at Brynmawr Foundation School, and then with supported-education provider, The Priory Group. She is currently a maths tutor with ACT Training, based in Caerphilly. Hale has specifically chosen to work with children experiencing difficulties, commenting in an interview: "I felt in mainstream schools that sometimes the kids lower down the classes can get forgotten a bit. They don't have the same opportunities."
