= Barry Davies (rugby union, born 1875) =

Wales international rugby union player

Barry Evans
- Born: W. Evans; 26 January 1875 Barry, Vale of Glamorgan
- Died: Unknown

Rugby union career
- Position: Forward
Amateur team(s)
Years	Team	Apps	(Points)
- Barry RFC
–	Cardiff Star		
–	Cardiff RFC		
–	Glamorgan		
International career
Years	Team	Apps	(Points)
1896	Wales	1	(0)

W. "Barry" Davies was a Welsh international rugby union forward who played club rugby for Cardiff and international rugby for Wales, playing in one match, against Scotland in 1896.

== Rugby career ==
Little is recorded of Davies, though it is known that he began his rugby career with Barry RFC, his hometown club and the origin of his nickname. Davies then switched to Cardiff Star, a small club team in Cardiff, notable for producing talent such as Gwyn Nicholls. Like Nicholls, Davies was noticed by major Welsh club Cardiff RFC joining them before the turn of the century.

In 1896 Davies was selected to represent the Wales national rugby team for the Home Nations Championship. Played at the Cardiff Arms Park against Scotland, the team, and the pack in particular saw a massive overhaul after a humiliating loss to England three weeks earlier. Davies was one of five new players brought into the eight man pack, and was joined by two Cardiff team mates in the backs, Nicholls and Selwyn Biggs. Despite being part of the winning team, Wales beating Scotland 6-0, Davies was replaced for the last game of the tournament by Fred Miller.

=== International matches played ===
Wales

- Scotland 1896

== Bibliography ==
- Godwin, Terry (1984). The International Rugby Championship 1883-1983. London: Willows Books. ISBN 0-00-218060-X.
- Griffiths, John (1987). The Phoenix Book of International Rugby Records. London: Phoenix House. ISBN 0-460-07003-7.
- Jenkins, John M.; et al. (1991). Who's Who of Welsh International Rugby Players. Wrexham: Bridge Books. ISBN 1-872424-10-4.
- Smith, David; Williams, Gareth (1980). Fields of Praise: The Official History of The Welsh Rugby Union. Cardiff: University of Wales Press. ISBN 0-7083-0766-3.
