= Porth Harlequins RFC =

(Wales) Porth Harlequins RFC
- Full name: Porth Harlequins Rugby Football Club
- Nickname(s): Quins
- Founded: 1934
- Location: Porth, Wales
- Ground(s): Welfare ground (Capacity: 2500)
- Chairman: Christian Rees
- Coach(es): Dano Roberts - Dan Preece
- League(s): WRU Division Two East Central
- 2011-12: 1st
Team kit

Official website
- www.porth-harlequinsrfc.co.uk

Porth Harlequins Rugby Football Club is a Welsh rugby union team based in Porth in the Rhondda Valley. Porth RFC is a member of the Welsh Rugby Union and is a feeder club for the Cardiff Blues.

== Club honours ==
- 2007/08 WRU Division Five South East - Champions
- 2011/12 WRU Division Four South East - Champions
- 2014/15 Worthington Mid-District Bowl Final - Winners
- 2015/16 WRU Division Two East Central - Champions
