= Pontycymmer RFC =

Welsh rugby union club, based in Pontycymmer

(Wales) Pontycymmer RFC
- Full name: Pontycymmer Rugby Football Club
- Founded: 1887; 139 years ago
- Location: Pontycymer, Wales
- Ground: Lawrence Park
- Chairman: Peter H Rees
- Coach: Darren Quigley
- League: WRU Division Four South East
- 2026: 3rd
Team kit

Official website
- www.pitchero.com/clubs/pontycymmerrfc/

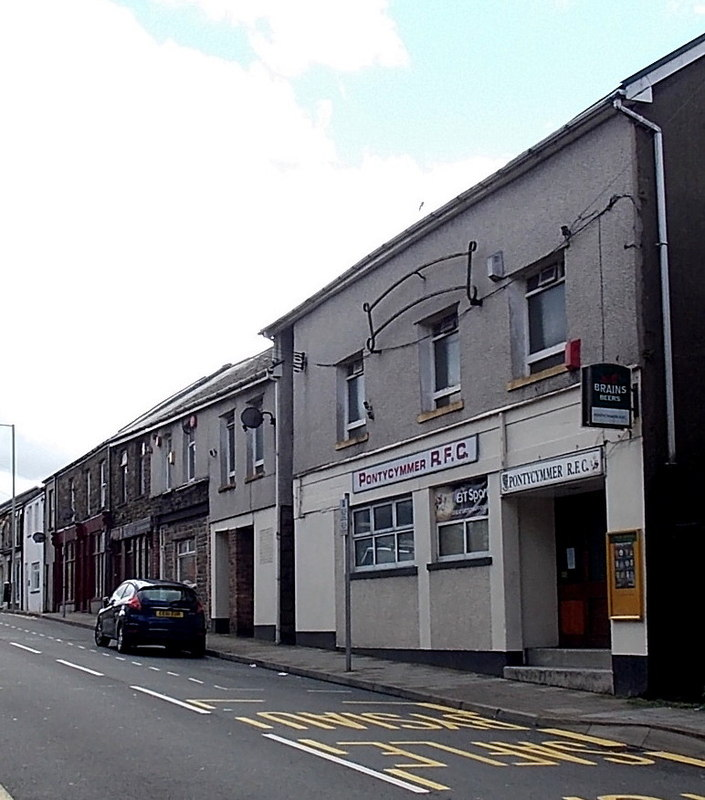

Pontycymmer Rugby Football Club are a Welsh rugby union club based in Pontycymmer near Bridgend, Wales and play their home games at Lawrence Park. The club colours are bottle Green and Amber.The club is a member of the Welsh Rugby Union and is also, along with Ogmore Vale RFC,a parent clubs of Valley Ravens Mini and Juniors. The club was formed in 1887

== Club honours ==
- WRU Division Six Central 1999/2000 - Champions
- WRU Division Four South East 2003/04 - Champions
- WRU Division Five South East 24-25 - Champions
- Central Glamorgan Cup Winners 2000 & 2004

== Notable former players ==
- Hopkin Maddock (6 caps)
- John Lloyd
- Jeff Young
