= Seb Davies =

Wales international rugby union player

- Full name: Sebastian Caradog Davies
- Born: 17 May 1996 (age 30) Cardiff, Wales
- Height: 1.98 m (6 ft 6 in)
- Weight: 119 kg (262 lb; 18 st 10 lb)
- School: Ysgol Gyfun Gymraeg Glantaf

Rugby union career
- Position(s): Lock, Flanker
- Current team: Dragons
Senior career
Years	Team	Apps	(Points)
2014–2025	Cardiff	148	(35)
2025 -	Dragons	16	(5)
- Correct as of 16 August 2026
International career
Years	Team	Apps	(Points)
2015–2016	Wales U20	10	(10)
2017–	Wales	18	(0)
- Correct as of 16 August 2026

Sebastian Caradog Davies (born 17 May 1996) is a Welsh professional rugby union player who plays as a lock for United Rugby Championship club Dragons and the Wales national team.

== Early life ==
Davies grew up in the Whitchurch area of Cardiff attending Melin Gruffydd primary school and Glantaf secondary school. Seb played Mini and Juniors rugby at Pentyrch RFC He proceeded to Coleg y Cymoedd after leaving Glantaf.

== Club career ==
Davies made his debut for Cardiff in 2014 having previously played for their academy team, Pontypridd RFC and Cardiff RFC.

After appearing for Cardiff a total of 148 times across nine seasons from 2016 to 2025, Davies made a move to Dragons in the URC for the 2025-2026 season after signing for them in May 2025.

== International career ==
In May 2017 Davies was selected for the Wales national team summer 2017 tour of Samoa and Tonga, making his test debut in the first test against Tonga.
