= Dafydd Lockyer =

Welsh rugby union footballer

- Born: Dafydd Lockyer; 5 June 1985 (age 41) Aberdare, Wales
- Height: 6 ft 3 in (1.91 m)
- Weight: 102 kg (16 st 1 lb; 225 lb)

Rugby union career
- Position: Centre
Amateur team(s)
Years	Team	Apps	(Points)
–	Abercwmboi RFC		
Senior career
Years	Team	Apps	(Points)
2003-2007	Pontypridd RFC	381	(460)
2007-2009	Neath		
2009-2020	Pontypridd RFC		
International career
Years	Team	Apps	(Points)
- Welsh Schools
- Wales Youth
2004-2006	Wales U21	8	
2014	Barbarians FC	1	

Dafydd Lockyer is a semi-professional rugby union player for Pontypridd RFC in the Principality Premiership and Abercwmboi RFC. Lockyer also works as an electrician.

== Early career ==
Born in Cwmbach, Wales, Lockyer played junior, youth and senior rugby for Abercwmboi RFC. In 2001, while still playing at Abercwmboi, Lockyer also represented the Pontypridd Academy, before gaining honours with both Wales Youth and Welsh Schools.

Lockyer joined the senior Pontypridd squad in 2003, scoring eight tries in his debut season and making most of his appearances as a winger.

== Initial success and move to Neath ==
Lockyer was called up to regional rugby, with the Celtic Warriors' Academy in the summer of 2004 but the region would be controversially disbanded and Lockyer returned to Pontypridd.

The 2004-05 season saw Lockyer establish himself as Pontypridd's inside centre and his performances won a call up to that year's Wales under 21s. By 2006 Lockyer was an integral part of Pontypridd's Welsh Cup victory, and again featured for Wales under 21s. Lockyer was also part of the Cardiff Blues Development squad.

Lockyer signed for Neath RFC in 2007 and participated in that club's double-championship-winning side. However, his time at Neath was marked by a number of injuries and his appearances were limited.

== Return to Pontypridd ==
He returned to Pontypridd in 2009 and his second tenure saw unprecedented success for the club.

Lockyer would win another cup winner's medal in 2011 and was also named Premiership Player of the Year. The following season saw Pontypridd crowned Premiership champions for the first of four consecutive titles.

During this period, Lockyer was again named Premiership Player of the Year in 2013 and won two more cup titles in 2013 and 2014. Lockyer would captain the side for the double winning season of 2013-2014, and also represent The Barbarians against Combined Services, Lockyer was also named Player of the Year by the Pontypridd Supporters' Club in 2015, the year Pontypridd won the WRU Challenge Cup. Lockyer would retain the club's captaincy until his last game in 2020.

On 15 December 2018 Lockyer made his 350th appearance for Pontypridd.

== Retirement ==
On 25 August 2021, during the enforced hiatus in Welsh rugby brought about by the COVID-19 pandemic, Lockyer announced he was stepping down from the Pontypridd squad, to focus on family, his partner Kelly, and work and to end his playing days back at Abercwmboi RFC.
