= Llanharan RFC =

Welsh rugby union club, based in Llanharan

(Wales) Llanharan RFC
- Full name: Llanharan Rugby Football Club
- Nickname(s): Black and Blues, Dairymen
- Founded: 1891; 135 years ago
- Location: Llanharan, Wales
- Ground: The Dairy Field
- Chairman: Hugh James
- Coach: Bill Carey
- Captain: Ieuan Pring
- League: Division 1 East Central
Team kit

Official website
- www.llanharanrfc.org.uk

Llanharan Rugby Football Club is a rugby union club based in Llanharan, South Wales. Llanharan RFC was formally established in 1891-92 when Llanharan was little more than an agricultural hamlet. The earliest photograph on the clubhouse wall is dated 1898. Llanharan RFC is a member of the Welsh Rugby Union and is a feeder club for the Cardiff Blues.

== Early history ==
In its early years, the club used local inns such as the High Corner and Turberville as a base. The club applied for Welsh Rugby Union membership in 1919 along with Pontyclun and Taffs Well. All three clubs were awarded membership on 22 August that year, but were told to "put your grounds in order".

In 1948 the first purpose-built headquarters/changing rooms were transported from RAF Llandow Airfield. A clubhouse was built in 1962 on the site of the old British Restaurant. The original building was a wartime hut, transported piece by piece from the RAF Stormy Down camp and progressively enlarged into three bars and a concert hall. Llanharan RFC moved from the old site in 2002 into new premises in the former British Legion club on the opposite side of Bridgend Road.

== Grounds ==
Llanharan RFC play their matches at The Dairy Field, named for the adjacent CWS Milk Depot which closed in the late 1960s after 50 years of milk processing. The club purchased the ground in 1989, having previously played on the Welfare Ground. Llanharan RFC marked the advent of the national league by playing their first game on the new field against Aberavon Quins to open the 1990-91 season.

== Colours ==
Llanharan RFC play in black shirts and shorts with three light blue horizontal hoops across the chest. The choice of colours is said to relate to impoverished bygone years when a sympathetic Cardiff gave a set of their kit to the club. The black and Cambridge blue has been worn ever since. In respectful appreciation Llanharan henceforth called themselves the "Black and Blues" as opposed to the "Blue and Blacks".

== Club badge ==
The badge is symbolic of the village's history and culture. The four quarters show:

- A sheaf of corn – pre-coal mining Llanharan was an agricultural village with its picturesque stone cottages with a church, corn mill and blacksmith; much of the economy related to the needs of the Llanharan House estate.
- A Llanharan spaniel – reputed to be a distinctive breed at a time when the estate also boasted its own pack of hunting hounds.
- The parish church of St Julius and Aaron – an ancient foundation that boasts a Tudor chalice.
- A pit head winding gear – reflecting the coal mining that dominated the village for almost a century.

The Llanharan badge also includes a black cross to commemorate the six players who died on 12 March 1950 in the Llandow air disaster.

== Club honours ==
- 2004/05 Glamorgan County President's Cup - Winners
- 2003/04 WRU Division One - Champions

== Notable former players ==
See also Category:Llanharan RFC players

The following players have represented Llanharan and have also been capped at international level.

- (Wales) Gareth Llewellyn
- (Wales) Glyn Llewellyn
- (Wales) Garfield Owen
- (Wales) Daniel Pascoe

Senior squad

1. Sam Grant 2. Sam Llewelyn 3. Brandon Nelson 4. Richard Byers 5. Tom Harris 6. Chris Osborne 7. Jordan Hughes 8. Owain Howe

9. Leon Burton 10. Scott Jones 11. Alex Newbold 12. Lloyd Gregory 13. Lloyd Thomas 14. Jack Pring 15. Lee Davies

16. Kyle Jones 17. Sam Pick 18. Tom Buckle 19. Craig Burton 20. Roy Furnival
