= Tom Lewis (rugby union) =

Wales international rugby union footballer

- Born: Thomas William Lewis; 7 June 1904 Taff's Well, Rhondda Cynon Taf, Wales
- Died: 31 May 1994 (aged 89) Cardiff, Wales
- Occupation(s): Miner; Police officer

Rugby union career
- Position: Number 8
Amateur team(s)
Years	Team	Apps	(Points)
–	Pentyrch RFC		
–	Taffs Well RFC		
–	Penylan RFC		
1923–1933	Cardiff RFC		
–	Glamorgan Police RFC		
–	Glamorgan County RFC		
International career
Years	Team	Apps	(Points)
1926–1927	Wales	3	(0)

Tom Lewis (7 June 1904 – 31 May 1994) was a Welsh international number 8 who played club rugby for Cardiff and was capped three times for Wales. Lewis began his rugby career with his local team Pentyrch before being selected to play for first class team Cardiff. He played all his international games whilst with Cardiff and in the 1932/33 season he also captained his club team.

== International rugby career ==
Lewis was first selected to play for Wales in the 1926 Five Nations Championship when he faced England at the Cardiff Arms Park on the 16 January. Lewis was one of 8 new Welsh caps on the day, and the relative inexperienced team, under the captaincy of Rowe Harding, drew 3-3 with the England team. Lewis was dropped for the rest of the tournament, but was back in 1927, again against England, but this time at Twickenham. Wales lost the match 11-9, though the team played with only 14 men for most of the match, when Newports Dai Jones was injured in the first quarter of an hour. Lewis's last game was for Ossie Male's team against Scotland, again in the 1927 Five Nations Championship. Wales lost at home 5-0 and Lewis was never selected for any future games.

=== International matches played ===
Wales

- England 1926, 1927
- Scotland 1927

== Bibliography ==
- Goodwin, Terry (1984). The International Rugby Championship 1883-1983. London: Willows Books. ISBN 0-00-218060-X.
- Smith, David; Williams, Gareth (1980). Fields of Praise: The Official History of The Welsh Rugby Union. Cardiff: University of Wales Press. ISBN 0-7083-0766-3.
