= John Yapp =

Wales international rugby union player

- Born: John Yapp; 9 April 1983 (age 43) Cardiff, Wales
- Height: 1.88 m (6 ft 2 in)
- Weight: 123 kg (19 st 5 lb)
- School: Cowbridge Comprehensive

Rugby union career
- Position: Prop
Senior career
Years	Team	Apps	(Points)
2003 -	Llantwit Major		
- Pontypridd
- Cardiff RFC
- Tuggeranong Vikings
	Cardiff Blues	105	(10)
2012–2014	Edinburgh	23	(0)
2014–16	Wasps	13	(0)
International career
Years	Team	Apps	(Points)
2005–2011	Wales	21	(0)
- Correct as of 3 Nov 2019 (UTC)

John Yapp (born 9 April 1983) is a retired Welsh international rugby union player, who played as a prop. He first played for Cardiff during the Christmas period in 2002. He made his first team debut against Ebbw Vale on Boxing Day at the age of 18. Despite his young age, he was featured in 17 of a possible 19 games by the end of the season and had been called up to train with the Wales-under-21 squad.

Yapp has represented Cardiff Youth and under-21s, winning cup and league medals and playing for Wales at under-19 level. Originally educated at Cowbridge Comprehensive School, he had first team experience with the Llantwit Major and Pontypridd clubs before becoming a full-time Cardiff Blues squad member.

Yapp won his first cap for Wales as a substitute in the victory over England in the RBS 6 Nations in February 2005 during the team's Grand Slam winning season.

In the summer of 2008, Yapp had discussions with club coach Dai Young and national coach Warren Gatland about the possibility of switching from loose head to tight head prop. He then headed out to Australia to play for Tuggeranong Vikings during the Northern hemispheres off season in an effort to become familiar with his new role in the scrum, before returning to the Cardiff Blues for the start of their domestic season.

In 2014, Yapp was listed as a replacement for London Irish during the Aviva Premiership round 17.

Wasps and former Wales prop John Yapp announced his retirement from rugby in 2015 after suffering a back injury. The 32-year-old made 13 appearances for Premiership side Wasps after signing from Edinburgh in July 2014. Yapp also won 21 test caps for Wales, and was part of the squad that won a Six Nations Grand Slam in 2005.
