= Dowlais RFC =

(Wales) Dowlais RFC
- Full name: Dowlais Rugby Football Club
- Nickname(s): 1st XV Dragons 2nd XV Knights
- Founded: 1975
- Location: Dowlais, Wales
- Ground(s): Klondyke
- Chairman: David Harris
- President: Glyn Llewellyn
- Coach(es): Kristian Owen, James Howe, Nathan Pritchard
- Captain(s): 1st XV (Dragons) James Churchill, 2nd XV (Knights) Rhys Harris
- League(s): WRU Division One East
- 2016/17: 5th
Team kit

Official website
- www.dowlaisrfc.co.uk

Dowlais Rugby Football Club is a Welsh rugby union club based in Dowlais near Merthyr Tydfil, Wales. The club is a member of the Welsh Rugby Union and is a feeder club for the Cardiff Blues.

Although a Dowlais rugby club existed in the late 19th century, formed by workers of the local Victorian ironworks, the modern team is not affiliated to this older side. Dowlais RFC was formed in 1975 by Sid Hill, who had also formed youth teams in Cefn Coed and Merthyr. The team originally joined the Rhondda & East Glamorgan District Union, but in 2001 became members of the Welsh Rugby Union and were placed in Division Seven Central. The club currently fields a First XV, Second XV Youth XV and has a Mini & Junior Rugby Section.

== Club honours ==
- WRU Division Four South East 2009/10 - Champions Captain Steven George
- WRU Division Three South East 2012/13 - Champions
- WRU Division Two East Central 2015/16 - Runners Up
