= Wilson Lauder =

Scotland international rugby union player

- Born: 4 November 1948 (age 78) Thornton, Fife, Scotland
- Height: 6 ft 2 in (188 cm)
- School: Heol Gam Secondary
- Occupation: Power plant engineer

Rugby union career
- Position: Flanker
International career
Years	Team	Apps	(Points)
1969–77	Scotland	18	(19)

Wilson Lauder (born 4 November 1948) is a former Scotland rugby union international based in Wales.

== Early life ==
Lauder was born in the village of Thornton in Fife, Scotland. He spent several years of his childhood in Rhodesia and when he was 11 years of age his family settled in Bridgend, Wales, where he attended Heol Gam Secondary School.

== Rugby career ==
Having not played rugby union until his arrival in Wales, Lauder developed his game under the mentorship of Wales fullback Grahame Hodgson, who taught at his school. He represented Wales Schoolboys in 1963–64.

Lauder played his early rugby with Llantwit Major, before switching to Neath in the 1967–68 season, to begin a 10-year career at The Gnoll. In 1971, he broke the Neath record for most points in a game twice in the space of a fortnight.

A flanker, Lauder represented the country of his birth in international rugby. He earned 18 times caps for Scotland between 1969 and 1977, featuring in overseas tours to Argentina, Australia and New Zealand.

Lauder played for Maesteg after leaving Neath and was later coach of Llantwit Major.

== See also ==
- List of Scotland national rugby union players
