= Haydn Morris =

Lions & Wales international rugby union player (1928–2021)

- Born: Haydn Thomas Morris; 14 July 1928 Mountain Ash, Wales
- Died: 17 January 2021 (aged 92)
- School: Mountain Ash Grammar
- University: Bangor Normal College; Cardiff Training College
- Occupation: Educator

Rugby union career
- Position: Wing
Amateur team(s)
| Years | Team | Apps | (Points) |
- Mountain Ash RFC
| – | Cardiff Training College | | |
| – | Beaumaris RFC | | |
| – | Barry RFC | | |
| – | Cardiff RFC | | |
| – | Barbarian F.C. | | |
International career
| Years | Team | Apps | (Points) |
| 1951-1955 | Wales | 3 | (6) |

Haydn Morris (14 July 1928 – 17 January 2021) was a Cardiff, Wales and British and Irish Lions international rugby union wing three-quarter.

== Career ==
Morris was born in Mountain Ash, Rhondda Cynon Taf, and joined Cardiff from his home club Mountain Ash, playing on the left wing. He made his debut for Wales on 7 April 1951 versus France at Stade Colombes, and won two more caps in 1955 against Ireland and France, with a try in both matches. He was selected for the 1955 British Lions tour to South Africa, scoring nine tries in eight appearances, with a hat trick against Griqualand West. Morris was a student of Cardiff Training College and, whilst playing for Cardiff RFC, was sports master and 1st XV coach from September 1952 until 1960, at Barry Boys' Grammar School.

On 20 January 2021, it was announced that he had died, aged 92.
