= Barry RFC =

Welsh rugby union club, based in Barry

(Wales) Barry RFC
- Full name: Barry Rugby Football Club
- Nickname: Bombers
- Founded: 1887; 139 years ago
- Location: Merthyr Dyfan, Barry, Wales
- Ground: Reservoir Fields (Merthyr Dyfan Road)
- League: WRU Division One East Central
Team kit

Official website
- www.barryrfc.com

Barry Rugby Football Club, commonly known as Barry RFC, is a Welsh rugby union club based in Barry, Vale of Glamorgan, Wales. The club plays its home matches at Reservoir Fields on Merthyr Dyfan Road and competes in the WRU Division One East Central league.

== History ==
Barry RFC is a long-established rugby club in Barry, commonly known as the "Bombers".

== Recent seasons ==
As of the 2025–26 season, the club's first XV competes in the WRU Division One East Central league.

In the 2024–25 season, Barry RFC Youth won the WRU National Youth Plate Final, defeating Gorseinon Youth at Rodney Parade in May 2025.

== Ground ==
Barry RFC plays its home matches at Reservoir Fields, located on Merthyr Dyfan Road in Barry.

== Club development ==
In the 2020s, Barry RFC began progressing plans to redevelop its clubhouse and wider facilities to support increased community use.

The proposed development includes refurbishment and expansion of the existing clubhouse to create a multi-use community hub, with improved changing facilities and enhanced space for community activities.

The club has also outlined longer-term ambitions to develop an all-weather 3G pitch to support year-round rugby and community use, subject to planning and funding.

== Honours ==
- WRU National Youth Plate: 2024–25

== Club honours ==
- WRU Division Five South East 2009/10 - Champions

== Notable former players ==
- (Wales) Geoff Beckingham
- (Wales) Barry Davies
- (Wales) Dai Evans
- (Wales) Haydn Morris
- (Wales) Mike Bubbins (Juniors and Youth)
