= Deri RFC =

- Full name: Deri Broncos Rugby Football Club
- Nickname(s): Broncos
- Founded: 1957
- Location: Deri, Caerphilly, Wales
- Ground(s): Parc Deri Newydd
- Chairman: Paul Colley
- Coach(es): David Iles & Jason Lundregan
- Captain(s): Jonathan Morgan
- League(s): WRU National League 5 East
- 2023/24: 1st
Team kit

Official website
- www.deribroncos.co.uk

Deri Rugby Football Club is a Welsh rugby union team based in Deri, Caerphilly in Wales. The club is a member of the Welsh Rugby Union and is a feeder club for the Newport Gwent Dragons. Deri RFC currently has only a Senior men's team.
