= Abercwmboi RFC =

Welsh Rugby Union football club

Abercwmboi Rugby Football Club is a Welsh Rugby Union club based in the Cynon Valley in South Wales. Abercwmboi RFC play in the Welsh Rugby Union Division Two East Central and is a feeder club for the Cardiff Blues.

== Notable players ==
- Ian Evans
- Dafydd Lockyer
- Rhydian Collins
