= Cowbridge RFC =

Welsh rugby union club

Cowbridge Rugby Football Club is a Welsh rugby union club based in Cowbridge, Wales. The club is a member of the Welsh Rugby Union and is a feeder club for the Cardiff Blues. Cowbridge RFC fields a senior XV.
