= Cardiff Quins RFC =

Welsh rugby union club

(Wales) Cardiff Quins RFC
- Full name: Cardiff Quins Rugby Football Club
- Nickname: Cardiff Harlequins
- Founded: 1928
- Location: Cardiff, Wales
- Ground: Diamond Ground
- President: Phil Judd
- Coach(es): Andrew Price, Mark Wysocki, Chadd Mutyambizi, Paul Newman
- League: WRU Division Four East
- 2011/12: 1st
Team kit

Official website
- www.chsobrfc.co.uk

Cardiff Quins Rugby Football Club is a Welsh rugby union club based in Cardiff in Wales. The club is a member of the Welsh Rugby Union and is a feeder club for the Cardiff Blues.

Cardiff Quins RFC owe their creation from student pressure to play the game of rugby in Cardiff High School where football (soccer) had been the sport of choice. In 1921 a rugby game was played between the Old Boys and a school XV. They played for two seasons but were disbanded after the loss of their playing field.

In 1928 the team was reformed when a new playing ground was made available, and it is this date that the team take as their founding year. Their first match was surprisingly against the far more experienced and grounded Cardiff RFC at the Cardiff Arms Park. As with all clubs in Wales the team disbanded during both World War periods but have been playing continuously from 1928. Originally the club only selected former students from Cardiff High School, but open membership was allowed in 1966.

== Notable former players ==
- (Wales) Wendy Davis
- (Wales) John Wakeford
