= 1997 Women's Home Nations Championship =

International rugby union competition

- Date: 12 January 1997 - 9 March 1997
- Countries: England; Ireland; Scotland; Wales

Tournament statistics
- Champions: England (2nd title)
- Grand Slam: England (2nd title)
- Triple Crown: England (2nd title)
- Matches played: 6

The 1997 Women's Home Nations Championship was the second women's rugby union Home Championship. It was won by England. The tournament was again held between the four British Isles home nations, Wales, England, Ireland and Scotland.

== Final table ==
Position	Nation	Games				Points			Table points
Position	Nation	Played	Won	Drawn	Lost	For	Against	Difference	Table points
1	England	3	3	0	0	79	25	+54	6
2	Scotland	3	2	0	1	41	26	+15	4
3	Wales	3	1	0	2	54	39	+15	2
4	Ireland	3	0	0	3	8	92	–84	0

== Results ==
12 January 1997

Scotland	10–0	Wales

Meggetland Sports Complex, Edinburgh

26 January 1997

Wales	32–5	Ireland

Bridgend

26 January 1997

England	23–3	Scotland

Blackheath, London

9 February 1997

Ireland	0–32	England

Limerick

23 February 1997

Scotland	28–3	Ireland

Pennypit, Edinburgh

9 March 1997

Wales	22–24	England

Worcester

== See also ==
- Women's Six Nations Championship
- Women's international rugby union
