= John Wakeford (rugby union) =

- Full name: John Donald Marshall Wakeford
- Born: 29 September 1966 (age 60) Cardiff, Wales
- Height: 6 ft 7 in (201 cm)
- Weight: 248 lb (112 kg)

Rugby union career
- Position: Lock
International career
Years	Team	Apps	(Points)
1988	Wales	2	(4)

John Donald Marshall Wakeford (born 29 September 1966) is a Welsh former rugby union international.

Wakeford, born in Cardiff, was educated at The Bishop of Llandaff High School and played his rugby as a lock. He competed for Bristol, Caerphilly, Cardiff, Merthyr and South Wales Police during his career.

In 1988, Wakeford was called up by Wales to play Western Samoa in Cardiff, having performed well against the same opponent for Welsh Counties Under-23, with Welsh selectors also keen to improve a non functioning line-out. On debut against Western Samoa he scored a try in a Wales win, then was capped again a month later against Romania, this time finishing on the losing side. These remained his only two Wales caps.

Wakeford was a member of the Cardiff team that reached the 1996 Heineken Cup final, to decide the inaugural edition of the European competition. They were beaten in extra time by Toulouse.

Now retired from the force, Wakeford was an officer with South Wales Police for 31 years.

== See also ==
- List of Wales national rugby union players
