= Llantwit Major RFC =

Welsh rugby union club

(Wales) Llantwit Major RFC
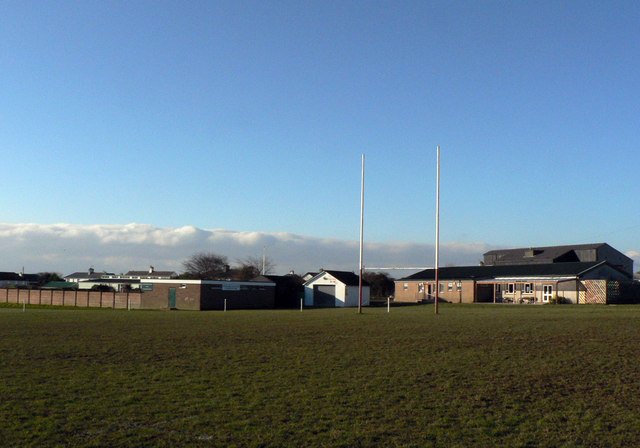
- Full name: Llantwit Major Rugby Football Club
- Nickname(s): The Blood & Blacks
- Founded: 1889; 136 years ago
- Location: Llantwit Major, Wales
- Ground(s): The Recreation Ground
- President: Jamie Sneddon
- Coach(es): Rhys Thomas
- League(s): WRU National League 3 East Central B
Team kit

Official website
- llantwitmajor.rfc.wales

Llantwit Major Rugby Football Club is a Welsh rugby union club based in Llantwit Major, Wales. Llantwit Major RFC is a member of the Welsh Rugby Union and is a feeder club for the Cardiff Blues.

It is believed that rugby was played in Llantwit Major as far back as 1880, though the first recorded game was in 1889 against a team from Cowbridge. The club disbanded during the Second World War but reformed soon after and in 1962 gained membership in the Welsh Rugby Union.

The club enjoyed considerable success in the early 1960s by dominating the prestige Glamorgan County Silver Ball cup competition reaching the semi-finals in 1963 before winning the title in 1964 and 1965. In recent times the club had another notable cup run in reaching the final of the Welsh Rugby Union National Bowl Competition at the Millennium Stadium; ultimately losing despite being cheered on by well over 800 Llantonian supporters in an enthralling 17-10 game to Clwb Rygbi Cymry Caerdydd.

Currently, the club manages two senior teams, one Under 19 team and also has a full Mini & Junior section with its own separate management framework.

There is a large social membership that runs darts (three dartboards and oches) and pool teams (three tables) in local leagues. Additionally, the club provides its facilities for community groups and clubs including Bingo, Tennis, Running, Boxing, Archery, Twinning Association, Royal British Legion, Freemasonry and the Town Council. The clubhouse also boasts a conference room and a large function room which regularly hosts dinners, concerts, birthdays, christenings, weddings and funeral receptions.

== Club honours ==
- Glamorgan County Silver Ball Trophy 1963–64 — Winners
- Glamorgan County Silver Ball Trophy 1964–65 — Winners
- Finalists National Bowl Competition 2014 - Runners-up

== Notable former players ==
- (Wales) Ernie George (3 caps)
- Dafydd Hewitt (Captained Wales U-21 & Senior Sevens)
- (Wales) Simon Hill (12 caps)
- (Scotland) Wilson Lauder (18 caps)
- (Wales) John Yapp (21 caps)
- (Wales) Mel Clay (29 caps)
