= Old Illtydians RFC =

Rugby team in Cardiff, Wales

(Wales) Old Illtydians RFC
- Full name: Old Illtydians Rugby Football Club
- Founded: 1928
- Location: Cardiff, Wales
- Ground(s): Moorland Park, Splott
- President: Michael Worthington
- Coach(es): Matt Silva; Dai Griffiths
- League: WRU Division Three East Central A
- 2014-15: 3rd WRU Division Three East Central A
Team kit

Official website
- oldilltydians.rfc.wales

Old Illtydians Rugby Football Club is a rugby union team from the city of Cardiff, Wales. The club is a member of the Welsh Rugby Union and is a feeder club for the Cardiff Blues. The club also runs mini and junior sides.

Old Illtydians were formed in September 1928 as Saint Illtyds Old Boys Rugby Club. St. Illtyds school was opened in 1924 and therefore had a limited range of 'old boys' to choose from. This resulted in a team with an average age of seventeen. The school used various grounds until 1932 when they secured the use of the Blackweir pitch, a ground they would play from for the next thirty five years.

Due to the club's connections to St. Illtyds school the team managed to keep playing for all but two years during the Second World War. In 1966 the club were successful in gaining membership to the Welsh Rugby Union and in 1967 they moved to their new ground in Leckwith.

In 2014 thanks to the work of Chairman John Manders the club secured a new long term lease on a ground in Moorland Park, Splott. This puts the club in closer proximity to its clubhouse, which is based on Splott Road.
