= Heol y Cyw RFC =

(Wales) Heol y Cyw RFC
- Full name: Heol y Cyw Rugby Football Club
- Nickname: Cockerels
- Founded: 1906
- Location: Heol-y-Cyw, Wales
- Chairman: Peter Hall
- Coach(es): Simon Jenkins and Paul Cooper
- League: WRU Division One East Central
- 2017/18: 5th
Team kit

Official website
- heolycyw.rfc.wales

Heol y Cyw Rugby Football Club are a rugby union club based in the Heol-y-Cyw, Wales. Heol y Cyw RFC are members of the Welsh Rugby Union and is a feeder club for the Ospreys.

Heol-y-Cyw RFC were formed in 1906. The present club house was built in 1976, and was officially opened by Wales rugby great Barry John.

== Club badge ==
The club badge is a shield which houses the image of a stone bridge and three chickens or cockerels. The shield is topped by a red dragon and a scroll with the team name lies beneath the shield. The badge reflects the town name, which roughly translates to the 'Road of the chicken', and also lends to the team nickname, 'The Cockerels'.

== Notable former players ==
- (Wales) Allan Bateman
