= Llanharan =

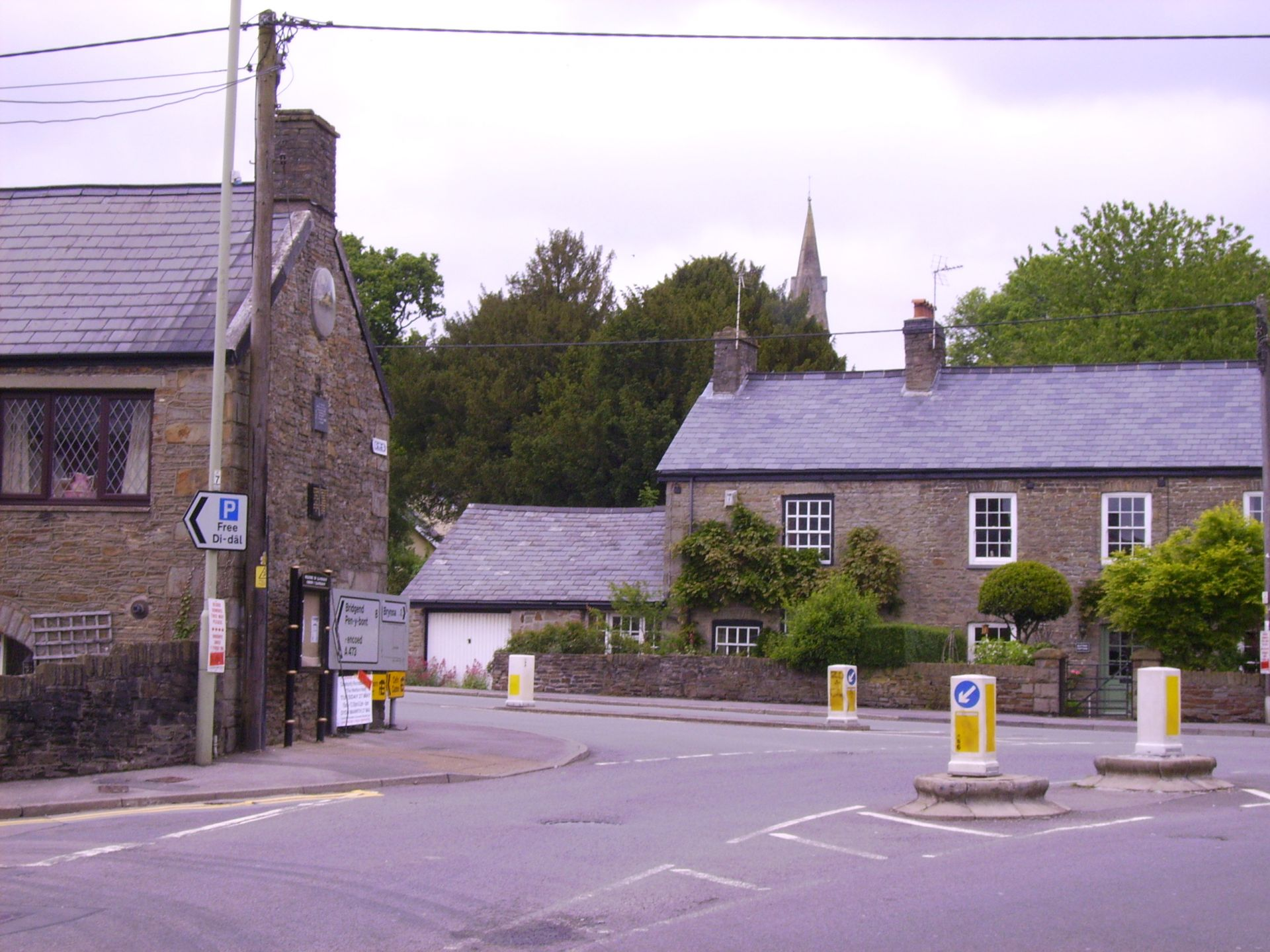
- Llanharan Square with the Church of St Julius and Aaron in the background

- Location within Rhondda Cynon Taf
- Population: 3,465 (2011)
- OS grid reference: ST012818
- Principal area: Rhondda Cynon Taf
- Preserved county: Mid Glamorgan
- Country: Wales
- Sovereign state: United Kingdom
- Post town: PONTYCLUN
- Postcode district: CF72
- Dialling code: 01443
- Police: South Wales
- Fire: South Wales
- Ambulance: Welsh
- UK Parliament: Pontypridd
- Senedd Cymru – Welsh Parliament: Ogmore
- List of places UK Wales Rhondda Cynon Taf 51.54°N 3.44°W Community map: Map of the community

Llanharan (Welsh pronunciation) is a village and community in the county borough of Rhondda Cynon Taf, Wales. As a community Llanharan takes in the neighbouring settlements of Bryncae, Brynna, Llanilid, Peterston-super-Montem and Ynysmaerdy. Llanharan thrived during the British Industrial Revolution, with several tin and coal mines in the location providing employment to the town's residents. With the decline of heavy industry in the South Wales Coalfield, Llanharan has been in economic decline, though its proximity to the M4 motorway offers its residents easy commutable access to most of South Wales.

Historically part of Glamorgan, the most recognisable features of Llanharan are its historic town square, Llanharan House and Church of St Julius and Aaron.

== Landmarks and notable buildings ==
=== Llanharan House ===
On the outskirts of Llanharan, overlooking the village, sits Llanharan House. It was built in 1750 by Rees Powell and stayed with the Powell family until 1795 upon which it was purchased by Richard Hoare Jenkins. Hoare Jenkins was a High Sheriff of Glamorgan and he was involved in the suppression of the Merthyr Rising of 1831, and is recorded as stating he found the execution of Dic Penderyn as the most difficult of his civic duties. Around 1800 some major improvements were made to the house with the addition of a three-storey circular stair hall which includes a dramatic geometrical staircase. Following the death of Hoare Jenkins in 1856 the house and the estate was passed to a Colonel John Blandy-Jenkins. Following his death in 1915 bequeathed land to be held for recreational use only, known as the Llanharan Recreation Ground, Managed by a board of trustees. Colonel Blandy-Jenkins's wife kept the house until 1953.

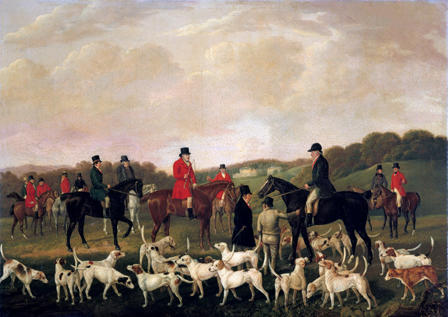
'Llanharran Hunt' (1840)

Llanharan house has a strong historical connection with fox hunting. This Welsh pack was named The Llanharan and was established by Richard Hoare Jenkins in 1805, though the pack was renamed the Llangeinor during the period when Mr John Blandy Jenkins was the squire. The Llangeinor is now based in Coity near Bridgend.

Llanharan House is a Grade II listed building.

=== The Church of St Julius and Aaron ===
The local parish church is the Church of St Julius and Aaron whose interior was redesigned in its present form by neo-gothic architect John Prichard around 1856, with work completed by 1859. The restoration work was financed by the Jenkins family of Llanharan House.

=== Llanharan Town Square ===
Llanharan Town square consists of several historical stone buildings situated by the local river the Ewenny Fach. Llanharan town square is dominated by a public house called The High Corner which dates back to roughly 1700. Outside the High Corner is an original red telephone box which was adopted by Llanharan Community Council in 2017. The adoption secured this iconic piece of British history. Work is ongoing to renovate the box which now is home to a defibrillator.

== Employment ==
Prior to the British Industrial Revolution, Llanharan was a small agricultural village, and this was reflected in the 1851 census where a population of 330 people living in 62 buildings was recorded. In 1850 the South Wales Railway had opened a station in Llanharan making it a strategic location for surrounding industries. Later employment came from the nearby iron mines in Llanharry and Pontyclun. Towards the end of the 19th century an additional 80 houses had been built and Llanharan had a population of over a thousand.

With the discovery of coal an attempt to sink two mine shafts began between 1870 and 1873, but the work was eventually abandoned as the pit was too wet and inclined.

In the early 1880s, in a different location to the first sinking attempt, the first deep mine in Llanharan was opened, the Meiros Colliery. The Meiros was listed in 1888 as owned by the Llanharan Welsh Estate of Cardiff; employing 228 men. The Meiros shaft was 200 yards deep and it mined the No. 3 seam (Rhondda). Meiros Collieries Ltd took over the colliery in 1913, and in 1915 the colliery underwent considerable modernisation. At its peak in 1923, the colliery was employing 622 men. The Meiros Colliery closed in the 1930s.

The Powell Duffryn Company restarted the sinking of the original steam coal seams abandoned in the early 1880s in 1922. This was named the Llanharan Colliery and consisted of two pits, Llanharan North and South pits which in 1945 employed a total of 855 and 775 men respectively. Output from the colliery was at its highest in the early and mid-1950s, producing over 234,000 tons of coal in 1952. From 1959 production began to fall sharply, and in 1962 Llanharan Colliery was closed down.

From 1900 until the Powell Duffryn's Llanharn colliery closed in 1962, the area westward along the Bridgend Road became the commercial heart of a relatively flourishing mining village that survived even the depression years.

Since the 1970s the residents of Llanharan have become more reliant on commuting to work as local employment reduces. Local amenities have also closed over the years including Llanharan's cinema, railway station (which reopened in 2007) and the library.

== Arts and entertainment ==
In 1997 Llanharan rugby ground was used in the box office smash film Up ‘n’ Under which is a 1998 film adaptation of the John Godber play of the same title.

In 2015 the set for the medieval television drama The Bastard Executioner was built near Llanharan.

== Education ==
There are two Primary Schools presently serving the community of Llanharan, they are Ysgol Dolau Primary School which is a bilingual school teaching through the medium of Welsh and English and also Llanharan Primary School.

== Transport ==
Llanharan is served by many buses and also Llanharan railway station, which reopened in December 2007 after 43 years of closure. The main road running through Llanharan is the A473 Bridgend Road, linking Bridgend to its west and Talbot Green to its east.

== Sports ==
=== Llanharan RFC ===
The village hosts a Rugby Football team, Llanharan Rugby Football Club, who play in the Welsh Rugby Union Championship Division. The club formed in 1891 and was awarded membership to the WRU in 1919. Llanharan RFC play in black shirts and shorts with three light blue horizontal hoops across the chest. Their nickname, the "Black and Blues", is taken from their colours. Their home ground is named The Dairyfield, and there is also another pitch available at The Llanharan Recreation Ground Trust (Welfare Ground) which is currently used for The Mini and Junior Rugby Teams. Group matches for the 1991 Women's Rugby World Cup were played at The Dairyfield.

=== South Wales Warriors ===
As of the 2009 season, The Dairy Field in Llanharan has been the home field of the South Wales Warriors American football team. As of 2022 the Warriors play in the SFC 1 West conference of the British American Football Association National Leagues, the primary American football adult contact league of the United Kingdom.

=== Llanharan AFC ===
Llanharan Football Club are currently in Saturday and Sunday Leagues, their home pitch is at Llanharan Recreation Ground.

Llanharan were League Winners in 2020.

== Welsh Springer Spaniel ==
It is thought that the breed of dog, the Welsh Springer Spaniel, either found its origins or was historically successfully bred in Llanharan. Some breeders speak of the “Llanharan Spot”, if one describes the red point in the middle on the head of the Welsh. The Llanharan Spaniel makes up part of the Llanharan RFC club badge.

== Bibliography ==
- Witts, T.J. (1988). The Forgotten Years, Volume 2; a history of Llanharan and district. Llanharan: Diary Publishing. ISBN 1-871691-00-1.
