= Pentyrch RFC =

Welsh rugby union club, based in Pentyrch

(Wales) Pentyrch RFC
- Full name: Pentyrch Rugby Football Club
- Nickname: Tyrchs
- Founded: 1882; 144 years ago
- Location: Pentyrch, Wales
- Ground: Parc-y-Dwrlyn Field
- Chairman: Kevin Fry
- Coach(es): Mark Barrington and Ellis Bevan
- League: WRU Division 2 East Central
- 2023/24: 6th
Team kit

Official website
- pentyrch.rfc.wales

Pentyrch Rugby Football Club is a Welsh rugby union club based in Pentyrch in Wales. Pentyrch RFC is a member of the Welsh Rugby Union and is a feeder club for Cardiff Rugby.

Pentrych RFC source their playing team mainly from local members of the community and also run a second team, veteran team, youth team and mini and junior section from age group Under-7's to Under-16's.

== Club honours ==
- 2008/09 WRU Division Four South East - Champions

== Past players of note ==
- (Wales) Tom Lewis
- (Wales) Robin Sowden-Taylor
- (Wales) Harry Robinson
- (Wales) Seb Davies
- (Wales) Harry Fry
