= Taffs Well RFC =

Welsh rugby union club, based in Taff's Well

(Wales) Taffs Well RFC
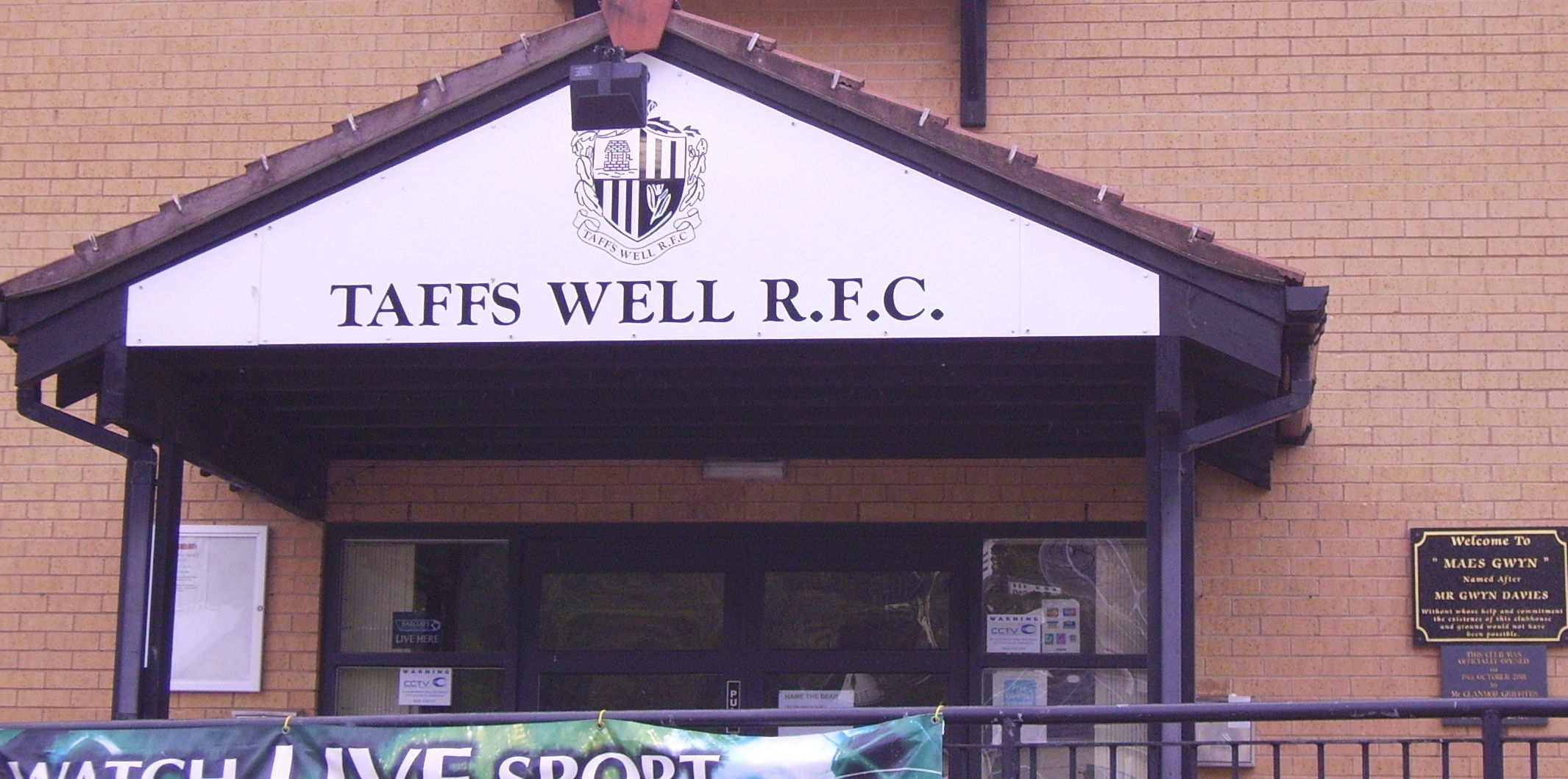
- Full name: Taffs Well Rugby Football Club
- Founded: 1887; 139 years ago
- Location: Taff's Well, Wales
- Ground: Maes Gwyn
- President: Phil Steele
- Coach: Leigh Medlicott
- League: WRU Div 2 East Central
- 2015/16 Div 3B Champions/WRU Bowl Finalists/Silver Ball S/Finalists/2016/17 Blues Youth division F Champions/2017/18 Div 3A R/U/Women's SWALEC Bowl Finalists Div. 3 East Central R/U 2016/17 Women's Bowl Finalists 2016/17
Team kit

Official website
- www.taffswellrfc.co.uk

Taffs Well Rugby Football Club are a rugby union club based in Taff's Well in South Wales. Taffs Well RFC were founded in 1887 and applied for and were successful in gaining membership to the Welsh Rugby Union in 1900. The club is a feeder club for the Cardiff Blues.

The first recorded game took place at Pentyrch RFC, which Taffs Well RFC duly won by two goals, four tries and seven minors to nil.

The club has produced three Welsh captains, six Welsh internationals and three British and Irish Lions.

British and Irish Lions	Welsh Captains	Welsh Internationals
Bleddyn Williams	Bleddyn Williams	Bleddyn Williams
Steve Fenwick	Steve Fenwick	Steve Fenwick
-	Lloyd Williams	Lloyd Williams
Ian Stephens	-	Ian Stephens
-	-	Harry Reese
-	Geraint Dawe	Tom Lewis

== Club honours ==
- Glamorgan County Silver Ball Trophy 1974-75 - Winners

== Notable former players ==
- (Wales) Tom Lewis (3 caps)
- (Wales) Bleddyn Williams (22 caps) caps)
- (Wales) Phillip Maksimovic (2 School Boy caps)
- Nathan Jones (Wales U21s 1 cap) (Welsh students 4 caps)
