= WRU Division Five South Central =

Welsh rugby union league

- Founded: 1995
- No. of teams: 11
- Country: Wales
- Most recent champion: Bridgend Sports RFC (2009–10)
- Level on pyramid: 6
- Promotion to: WRU Division Four South East, WRU Division Four South West
- Relegation to: WRU Division Six Central
- Website: www.wru.co.uk/2093_2108.php?%2FWRU

The Welsh Rugby Union Division Five South Central (also called the SWALEC Division Five South Central for sponsorship reasons) is a rugby union league in Wales first implemented for the 1995/96 season.

== Competition format and sponsorship ==
=== Competition ===
There are 11 clubs in the WRU Division Five South Central. During the course of a season (which lasts from September to May) each club plays the others twice, once at their home ground and once at that of their opponents for a total of 20 games for each club, with a total of 110 games in each season. Teams receive four points for a win and two point for a draw, an additional bonus point is awarded to either team if they score four tries or more in a single match. No points are awarded for a loss though the losing team can gain a bonus point for finishing the match within seven points of the winning team. Teams are ranked by total points, then the number of tries scored and then points difference. At the end of each season, the club with the most points is crowned as champion. If points are equal the tries scored then points difference determines the winner. The team who is declared champion at the end of the season is eligible for promotion to the WRU Division Four South. The two lowest placed teams are relegated into the WRU Division Six Central.

=== Sponsorship ===
In 2008 the Welsh Rugby Union announced a new sponsorship deal for the club rugby leagues with SWALEC valued at £1 million (GBP). The initial three year sponsorship was extended at the end of the 2010/11 season, making SWALEC the league sponsors until 2015. The leagues sponsored are the WRU Divisions one through to seven.

- (2002-2005) Lloyds TSB
- (2005-2008) Asda
- (2008-2015) SWALEC

== 2010/2011 Season ==
=== League teams ===
- Banwen RFC
- Blaengarw RFC
- Bryncethin RFC
- Cefn Cribwr RFC
- Cwmgwrach RFC
- Hirwaun RFC
- Ogmore Vale RFC
- Pontycymmer RFC
- Resolven RFC
- Rhigos RFC
- South Wales Police RFC
- Tonna RFC

== 2009/2010 Season ==
=== League teams ===
- Baglan RFC
- Banwen RFC
- Blaengarw RFC
- Bridgend Sports RFC
- Bryncethin RFC
- Cefn Cribwr RFC
- Cwmgwrach RFC
- Hirwaun RFC
- Ogmore Vale RFC
- Rhigos RFC
- South Wales Police RFC
- Wattstown RFC

=== League table ===
2009-2010 WRU Division Five South Central League Table
Club	Played	Won	Drawn	Lost	Points for	Points against	Tries for	Tries against	Try bonus	Losing bonus	Points
Bridgend Sports RFC	20	17	0	3	918	189	136	22	16	2	86
Wattstown RFC	20	16	0	4	614	231	79	25	9	2	75
Bryncethin RFC	20	15	0	5	587	261	87	33	11	3	74
Baglan RFC	20	13	1	6	660	302	98	39	10	1	65
Cwmgwrach RFC	20	14	0	6	412	406	56	55	6	0	62
Hirwaun RFC	20	9	0	11	385	486	51	64	7	4	47
Rhigos RFC	20	9	1	10	303	325	37	38	3	3	44
South Wales Police RFC	20	6	0	14	219	475	26	69	2	2	28
Cefn Cribwr RFC	20	5	0	15	242	535	25	75	2	4	26
Ogmore Vale RFC	20	4	0	16	186	619	20	87	0	3	19
Blaengarw RFC	20	1	0	19	100	797	12	120	0	2	6
Banwen RFC	0	0	0	0	0	0	0	0	0	0	0
Correct as of 4 August 2010

== 2008/2009 Season ==
=== League teams ===
- Baglan RFC
- Banwen RFC
- Blaengarw RFC
- Bridgend Sports RFC
- Cefn Cribwr RFC
- Crynant RFC
- Cwmgwrach RFC
- Ogmore Vale RFC
- Pyle RFC
- Rhigos RFC
- South Wales Police RFC

=== League table ===
2008-2009 WRU Division Five South Central League Table
Club	Played	Won	Drawn	Lost	Points for	Points against	Tries for	Tries against	Try bonus	Losing bonus	Points
Pyle RFC	20	17	1	2	645	209	92	28	9	1	80
Cwmgwrach RFC	20	16	0	4	564	201	91	24	11	1	76
Bridgend Sports RFC	20	13	3	4	461	253	65	28	7	2	67
Cefn Cribwr RFC	20	10	0	10	322	323	50	42	5	4	49
Ogmore Vale RFC	20	10	1	9	321	333	34	39	4	1	47
Banwen RFC	20	10	0	10	293	390	37	47	2	2	44
Rhigos RFC	20	8	2	10	307	340	38	45	2	4	42
Baglan RFC	20	7	3	10	381	319	50	46	6	2	42
South Wales Police RFC	20	6	0	14	178	523	21	81	2	0	26
Blaengarw RFC	20	4	1	15	192	511	26	77	3	4	25
Crynant RFC	20	3	1	16	232	494	24	71	1	4	19
Correct as of 28 June 2009

== 2007/2008 Season ==
=== League teams ===
- Aberavon Green Stars RFC
- Baglan RFC
- Blaengarw RFC
- Bridgend Sports RFC
- Cefn Cribwr RFC
- Crynant RFC
- Cwmgwrach RFC
- Porthcawl RFC
- Pyle RFC
- Rhigos RFC
- South Wales Police RFC

=== League table ===
2007-2008 WRU Division Five South Central League Table
Club	Played	Won	Drawn	Lost	Points for	Points against	Tries for	Tries against	Try bonus	Losing bonus	Points
Aberavon Green Stars RFC	20	19	1	0	708	149	107	17	13	0	91
Porthcawl RFC	20	16	2	2	475	243	69	30	9	0	77
Cefn Cribwr RFC	20	15	0	5	524	290	76	35	9	2	71
Pyle RFC	20	11	2	7	449	298	64	43	5	3	56
Bridgend Sports RFC	20	10	1	9	470	359	57	50	6	5	53
Baglan RFC	20	8	2	10	363	370	45	52	5	4	45
Cwmgwrach RFC	19	9	0	10	300	333	41	44	5	2	43
South Wales Police RFC	20	4	2	14	294	658	41	100	3	1	24
Blaengarw RFC	19	4	1	14	173	375	24	53	0	4	22
Rhigos RFC	20	4	0	16	177	478	23	69	0	4	20
Crynant RFC	20	3	1	16	219	599	32	86	1	1	16
Correct as of 18:13 13 May 2008
