= Ogmore School =

Coordinates: 51.552°N 3.567°W

Ogmore Comprehensive School (formed in 1972)

Location
- Spout Hill; Bryncethin, Bridgend County Borough, CF32 9NA; Wales

Information
- Former name: Ogmore Grammar School
- Type: Secondary
- Motto: Preparing Pupils For Life
- Established: 1972; 54 years ago (Comprehensive)
- Closed: 2011
- Local authority: Bridgend County Borough
- Gender: Mixed
- Age: 11 (Year 7) to 18 (Year 13)
- Houses: Coch (Red); Glas (Blue); Gwyrdd (Green); Melyn (Yellow)
- Colours: Navy, Red and Blue
- Publication: "www.ogmore.org". Archived from the original on 13 February 2010.

Ogmore Comprehensive school, formerly known as Ogmore Grammar School, was a secondary school located in the Bridgend County Borough in Wales, UK. Ogmore Comprehensive School's mottos was “Preparing Pupils for life".

The school was established as a comprehensive school in 1972 and covered Year 7 to Year 13, ages 11 to 18. The school colours were Navy Blue and Red, with coordinating navy blue colored uniforms. It closed in 2011 through merger with a neighbouring school to form Coleg Cymunedol Y Dderwen.

== School history ==
The school was established in 1910 as the Ogmore Higher Elementary School, the new building costing £8,000 and accommodating 250 pupils. In 1921 it became Ogmore Secondary School, and in 1948 Ogmore Grammar School. The grammar school had circa 350 pupils, with 2 forms per year and an Upper and Lower Sixth. Despite this small size the school regularly fielded a first and second 15 rugby team and was renowned for its netball teams. The old grammar motto had been 'Fel Yr A Ymnertha' (As it is Strengthened). School houses were Tudor (Blue), Llewellyn (Green) and Glyndwr (Red).

In 1972 the grammar merged with Nantymoel Secondary School to form a co-educational secondary Ogmore Comprehensive School, the grammar school building becoming the Upper Comprehensive and Nantymoel Park School the Lower Comprehensive. In 1977 a new building at Spout Hill, Bryncethin was opened and became the Upper School, with all pupils in the Lower Comprehensive moving to the old Grammar School site in Fairy Glen in 1982. In the 1980's both upper and Lower schools were united in a new school building at Bryncethin. The comprehensive had approximately 710 pupils aged 11–18 in its last full year, which made it the smallest secondary state school in Bridgend.

As the number of pupils enrolling every year continued to drop, the council considered closing a local school. However in 2010, Bridgend County Borough Council decided to merge Ogmore Comprehensive with the local Ynysawdre Comprehensive School to form a new school, known as Coleg Cymunedol Y Dderwen. Ogmore Comprehensive officially had its last day in July 2011, with pupils and staff, past and present, holding an open day. The new merged school opened in September 2011.

== Notable former pupils ==
- Heavy metal band Bullet for My Valentine members Michael Thomas, Jason James, Matthew Tuck, and Michael Thomas.
- Keith Bradshaw: Wales international rugby union player.
- Lynn Davies: Olympic gold medallist Lynn Davies CBE Welsh former track and field athlete who specialised in the long jump. He was the 1964 Olympic champion in the event. He was born in Nantymoel near Bridgend and was a member of the Cardiff Amateur Athletic Club.
- Windsor Davies (actor) was born in Canning Town, Essex, to Welsh parents, who returned to their native village of Nantymoel in 1940. Davies' best-known role was as Battery Sergeant Major Williams in the British sitcom It Ain't Half Hot Mum (1974–1981).
- Beth Edwards – Award winning BBC news and sport journalist and producer.
- Ian Hamer, British former long-distance runner. He competed in the 1992 Summer Olympics. He was the bronze medallist in the 5000 metres at the 1990 Commonwealth Games. Club Swansea Harriers.
- Professor Peter John, Vice Chancellor of the University of West London and awarded CBE in 2019.
- Sir David Prosser, financier who was chief executive of insurance company Legal & General.
- Gareth Thomas: nicknamed "Alfie", Welsh former professional rugby player, who represented Wales in both rugby union and rugby league. With 100 test match appearances he was the most capped Welsh rugby union player until he was overtaken by Stephen Jones in September 2011.
- Gavin Thomas: former Welsh international rugby union flanker, who was capped 24 times for Wales.

== Sixth form partnership ==
For many years, Ogmore School operated as a partnership with Ynysawdre in order for the two schools to offer a wider choice of subjects and opportunities to those pupils who chose to return for the sixth form. As a result, many pupils travelled between the two schools as some subjects were only available at the other school.

== Uniform ==
School Uniform

Keystage	Jumper	Polo Shirt	Trousers
Keystages 3 & 4 (Years 7-11)	Navy	White	Black
Keystage 5 (Sixth Form)	Black	White	Black

== Catchment area ==
Ogmore School served the area of Ogmore Vale, Nantymoel, Bryncethin, Sarn, Blackmill, Lewistown, Pricetown and Wyndham. Whereas the old Grammar School saw its catchment area cover Litchard and Coity (for girls) and Pencoed and Heol Y Cyw for boys and girls. The new school continued to serve these catchment areas along with picking up Ynysawdre Comprehensive School's areas such as Tondu and the Blaengarw valley along with others. Housing developments within these catchment areas is also expected to keep increasing the number of pupils enrolling in the school year after year, this being one of the major reasons for the new school.
