= Foel Chwern =

Round cairn in Neath Port Talbot, Wales

Foel Chwern Round Cairn
- Y Foel Cherwn
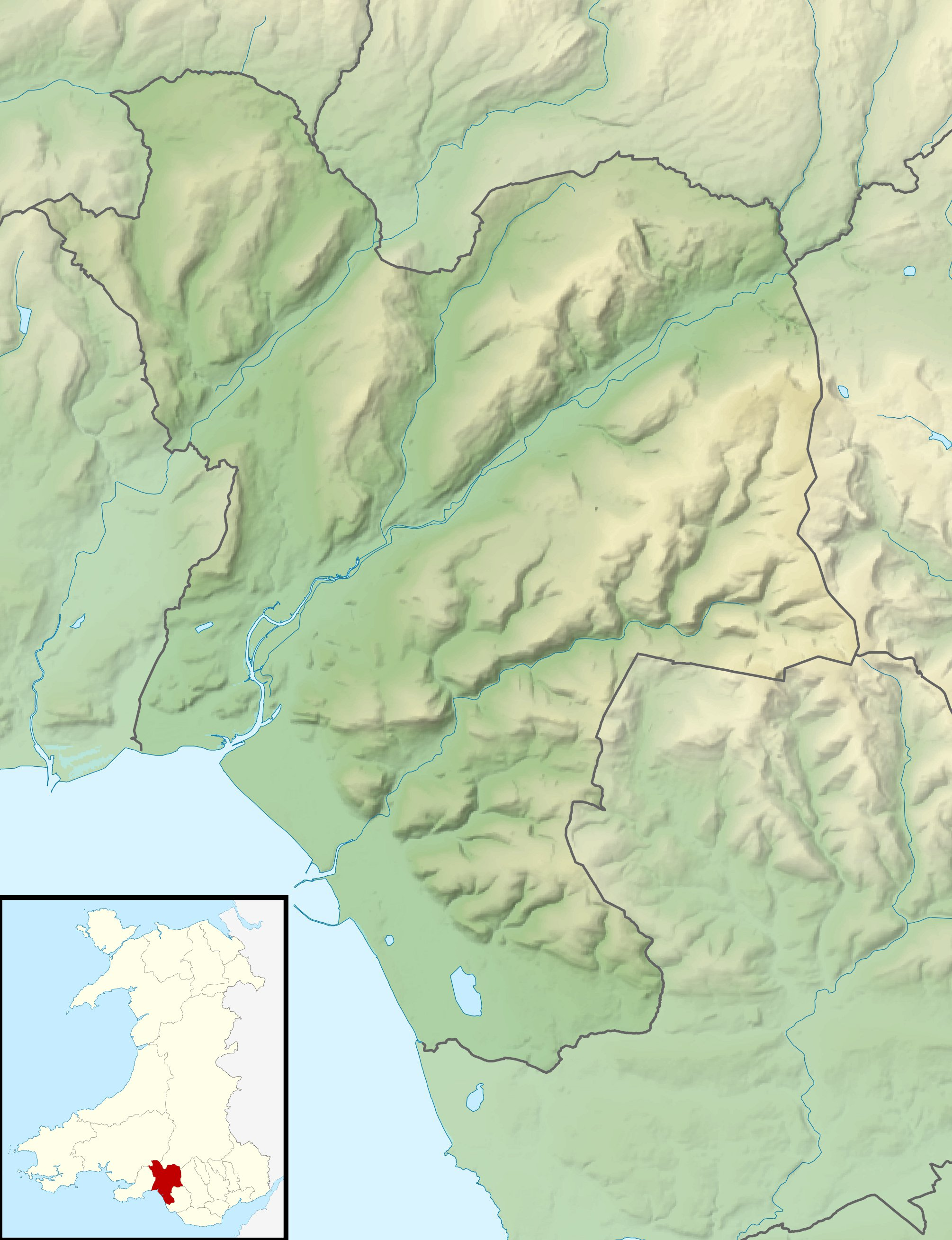
- Foel Chwern, within Blaengwrach Community, Neath Port Talbot
- 51.7228°N 3.5962°W
- Type: Round cairn
- Periods: Bronze Age
- Cultures: Celtic Brittonic
- Location: High ridge east of Cwmgwrach, Neath Port Talbot, Wales (OS Grid ref SN898038)
- Region: South Wales

Site notes
- Area: 50 m^{2} (540 sq ft)
- Condition: Grass-covered mound of slabby stones, poorly defined edges.
- Public access: Yes

Scheduled monument
- Reference no.: GM235

Foel Chwern is a Round cairn on the edge of the high plateau east of the Neath valley, and near the summit of Craig y Llyn. The headwaters of the River Rhondda are to the south-west. It is a burial monument dating to the Bronze Age, and is sited on the edge of a steep scarp slope, with a wide field of view to the north. The long distance footpath Coed Morgannwg Way runs close by the cairn. Conifer plantations of the Rheola Forest surround the site.

== Cairn ==
The cairn is a mound roughly 8 metres (26 ft) across and 0.4 metres (1.3 ft) high, made up of small stones. The visible ones appear to be slabs of the locally occurring sandstone, although much of the mound is grass covered, so most stones are obscured and the edge is very indistinct. In 1977 the mound was reported to have received some damage during 20th century forestry activity, and received a partial excavation around this time, which confirmed its size, but revealed neither any burials nor any other finds. The cairn is a Scheduled Monument.

== Situation ==
The scarp edge on which the cairn was built is at 568 metres (1,864 ft) above sea level, on a ridge that culminates half a mile (1 km) to the south at the 600 metres (2,000 ft) summit of Craig y Llyn, the highest point in Glamorgan It is a large tract of unnocupied land, with nor roads, now substantially planted with conifers. It is part of the Rheola Forest, which occupies a large area to the east of the Neath valley, above Cwmgwrach, planted with spruce and larch by the Forestry Commission in the mid 20th century. Before that years of coalmining had left over 150 collieries and mines and 15 tramways across the plateau. A large open-cast coalmines continues to operate a kilometer to the north of the cairn.

The scarp winds its way east-west between Rhigos and Mynydd Resolven, and various Bronze Age cairns are strung out along its length. For example to the west are Craig-y-Pant and Garn Fach, and to the east, Twyn Canwyllyr, Craig-y-Bwlch and Rhondda Fach Cairns, all occupying similar locations on the scarp.

== Access ==
There are no roads within 2 miles (3 km) of the cairn, the nearest being the A4061 across Hirwaun Common. The long-distance Coed Morgannwg Way runs east-west from there along the scarp, immediately past the cairn before turning south to Cwm Afon. Other tracks and paths and cycle paths within the woodland also provide easy access to the monument. National Route 47 of the National Cycle Network passes through the woodland to the south of Foel Chwern.

== See also ==
- List of Scheduled Monuments in Neath Port Talbot
