= Coleg Cymunedol Y Dderwen =

Location
- Ynysawdre, Bridgend County Borough, CF32 9EL; Wales
- Coordinates: 51.5466690°N 3.5870030°W

Information
- School type: Secondary School
- Motto: Taking Pride
- Opened: September 2013
- Local authority: Bridgend County Borough
- Headteacher: Tracey Wellington
- Gender: Coeducational
- Age: 11 to 19
- Enrolment: 1291
- Student to teacher ratio: 17.2
- Language: English medium
- Website: http://ccyd.org.uk/

Coleg Cymunedol Y Dderwen is a large English-medium comprehensive school serving the Garw and Ogmore valleys. The school was formed as a result of a merger of Ogmore Comprehensive School and Ynysawdre Comprehensive School in 2011. The school initially operated as a split site school, with students being taught on the campus of both of the previous schools, but in 2013 the school moved to its new building located next to the old Ynysawdre site.

The new building, designed by Scott Brownrigg and constructed by Leadbitter won the BREEAM Outstanding award in 2013.

The school was the first in Wales to issue all of its students with an iPad Mini as educational tools, designed to inspire creativity and aid hands on learning.

For 2017, Coleg Cymunedol Y Dderwen was placed in the Amber support category by the Welsh Government.

In May 2025, Estyn judged that the school had made sufficient progress in addressing the recommendations from the Section 28 inspection in October 2023. The school has been removed from the list of schools requiring Estyn review.
