= Gwyn Richards =

Wales international rugby union & league footballer

Personal information
- Full name: Ernest Gwyn Richards
- Born: 22 December 1905 Bryncethin, Wales
- Died: 17 December 1985 (aged 79) Bridgend, Wales

Playing information

Rugby union
- Position: Fly-half
Club
Years	Team	Pld	T	G	FG	P
	Bryncethin RFC
	Bridgend RFC
1926–27	Cardiff RFC	44	6
	Torquay Athletic RFC
	Total	44	6	0	0	0
Representative
Years	Team	Pld	T	G	FG	P
1927	Wales	1	0	0	0	0

Rugby league
- Position: Stand-off
Club
Years	Team	Pld	T	G	FG	P
1927–≥35	Huddersfield
1936–37	Hull Kingston Rovers
1938/39–38/39	Leigh	3	1	0	0	3
	Total	3	1	0	0	3

Ernest Gwyn Richards (22 December 1905 – 17 December 1985) was a Welsh rugby union and professional rugby league footballer who played in the 1920s and 1930s. He played representative level rugby union (RU) for Wales, and at club level for Bryncethin RFC, Bridgend RFC, Cardiff RFC and Torquay Athletic RFC, as a fly-half, and club level rugby league (RL) for Huddersfield, and Leigh, as a stand-off.

== Background ==
Gwyn Richards was born in Bryncethin, Wales, and he died aged 79 in Bridgend, Wales.

== Playing career ==
=== International honours ===
Gwyn Richards won a cap for Wales (RU) while at Cardiff RFC in 1927 against Scotland.

=== Challenge Cup Final appearances ===
Gwyn Richards played stand-off and scored a try in Huddersfield's 21–17 victory over Warrington in the 1933 Challenge Cup Final during the 1932–33 season at Wembley Stadium, London on Saturday 6 May 1933. and played stand-off in the 8–11 defeat by Castleford in the 1935 Challenge Cup Final during the 1934–35 season at Wembley Stadium, London on Saturday 4 May 1935, in front of a crowd of 39,000.
