= Blaengwrach =

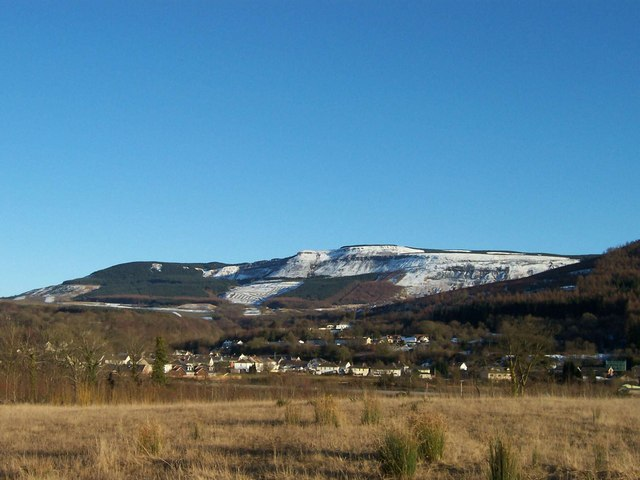

- Location within Neath Port Talbot
- Population: 1,141 (2011 census)
- OS grid reference: SN868052
- Principal area: Neath Port Talbot
- Preserved county: West Glamorgan
- Country: Wales
- Sovereign state: United Kingdom
- Post town: NEATH
- Postcode district: SA11
- Dialling code: 01639
- Police: South Wales
- Fire: Mid and West Wales
- Ambulance: Welsh
- UK Parliament: Neath and Swansea East
- Senedd Cymru – Welsh Parliament: Neath
- Councillors: Hayley Davies (Independent)
- List of places UK Wales Neath Port Talbot 51.73404°N 3.64064°W Map of the community

Blaengwrach (/blaɪnˈɡrɑːx/ blyne-GRAHKH, Welsh: [ˌblainˈɡwraːχ]) is a community near Glynneath and Resolven in the county borough of Neath Port Talbot, Wales. It is also the name of an electoral ward of Neath Port Talbot county borough, which is a larger area than the Community. The principal settlement is Cwmgwrach, a village on the south side of the Neath valley, of which the eastern end is called Blaengwrach, which sometimes causes confusion. Gwrach is one of the streams feeding in to the River Neath- the village of Blaengwrach means “Beginning of the Gwrach” (stream) and Cwmgwrach means “Valley of the Gwrach” which refers to the Gwrach stream and not as some believe, the witch.

Map of Blaengwrach Community on the north-east edge of Neath Port Talbot County Borough.

== Geography ==
Blaengwrach Community is a predominantly upland area, and contains the highest points of three local hills or mountains, namely Mynydd Resolfen (383m/1257 ft) and the more prominent Mynydd Pen-y-Cae (573m/1880 ft) and Craig-y-Llyn (600m/1970 ft), both of which have views of the valley below and the Brecon Beacons in the distance. Craig-y-Llyn is the highest point in the old county of Glamorgan, and is home to a nature reserve containing Llyn Fach and a Site of Special Scientific Interest. West of the summit is Foel Chwern round cairn.

== Settlement ==
The villages of Cwmgwrach and Blaengwrach are on the upper reaches of the Neath Valley, and occupy the strip of lowland south of the River Neath, and up the lower slopes of the hillside around the Nant Gwrach stream. The ward had a population of 1,985 in the 2001 census, but 837 were residents of the neighbouring community of Glynneath, so the population of the Blaengwrach community was 1,148. The ward population changed very little at the census of 2011.

The settlement of Blaengwrach is sometimes confused with the village of Cwmgwrach, the name that is used for both the village as a whole, and the western settlement. Traditionally, the stream is the dividing line. The Community Council describe Cwmgwrach, as being a village that 'is actually a combination of Blaengwrach and Cwmgwrach'. A history of the village (Cwmgwrach: Valley of the Witch) was written by Ian Currie, published in 2000.

The village itself was once an active commercial centre, servicing the coalmines, but now contains one shop, a single pub and a rugby union club, Cwmgwrach RFC. Other community facilities include Blaengwrach Primary School, St Mary's Church in Wales, the 13th Afannedd (Cwmgwrach) Scout group, and the Welfare Hall. For wider services the village is largely dependent upon Glynneath.

On the western edge of Cwmgwrach are the ruins of Venallt Ironworks constructed around 1839–42. Iron was smelted here using anthracite coal using the recently developed hot blast method until the closure of the works in 1854. Most of the remains on land owned by Natural Resources Wales are now a scheduled monument and open to the public.

== Transport ==
The Neath and Tennant Canal once reached to Glyn-neath, and has been restored to provide over four miles of walkable towpath between Resolven and Glynneath. The Vale of Neath Railway was built by Isambard Kingdom Brunel to carry coal to Swansea docks, and is still used for freight trains transporting coal from the Unity open cast mine at the north-east edge of the village. In 1996 the single-carriageway road along the length of the Neath valley was replaced with a major dual-carriageway, carrying the A465 trunk road from Llandarcy (near Neath) to Hirwaun in Rhondda Cynon Taf, which transformed the access along the Neath valley.

== Government and politics ==
Blaengwrach was in the parliamentary constituency of Neath until 2024, when it became a part of the new constituency of Neath and Swansea East.

For elections to Neath Port Talbot County Borough Council, Blaengarwch is covered by the 'Blaengarwch and Glynneath West' electoral ward, which also covers the west part of the Glynneath community (though not the village of Glynneath). The ward elects one councillor.

=== Blaengwrach and Glynneath West (one seat) ===
Blaengwrach and Glynneath West 2022
Party	Candidate	Votes	%	±%
Independent	Hayley Davies	498	59.0	
Plaid Cymru	Carol Edwards*	311	36.8	
TUSC	Rhys Davies	35	4.1	
Majority		187		
Turnout		858	37	
Independent gain from Plaid Cymru		Swing		

The former ward of Blaengwrach included part or all of the villages of Blaengwrach and Cwmgwrach, as well as Glynneath town.

In the 2017 local council elections, the Blaengwrach results were:

Candidate	Party	Votes	Status
Carolyn Edwards	Plaid Cymru	400	Plaid Cymru gain
Phillip Parfitt	Labour	158	
Richard Pritchard	UKIP	61	

In the 2012 local council elections, the electorate turnout was 42.28%. The Blaengwrach results were:

Candidate	Party	Votes	Status
Alf Siddley	Labour	363	Labour hold
Joan Bodman	Plaid Cymru	290	

== Film ==
In 2014, a film called 'Valley of the Witch', was released, set in Cwmgwrach, and with substantial on location filming. A low-budget indie horror/witchcraft film, it was written and directed by Andrew Jones, and released to DVD in 2015 under the title 'Conjuring the Dead'.
