= Valleys Gateway =

Valleys Gateway names the five merged villages north of Bridgend and the M4 in Bridgend County Borough, Wales. The villages are Aberkenfig, Bryncethin, Brynmenyn, Sarn and Tondu.

Valleys Gateway could be considered a town as it has amenities such as Ynysawdre Swimming Pool & Fitness Centre, Aberkenfig Library and Sarn Lifelong Learning Centre.

== Transport ==
The area is accessible by public transportation, road, foot or bicycle. Junction 36 of the M4 is less than a mile from Sarn, Bridgend. Bryncethin and runs to the south of the area. The area also has two railway stations on the Maesteg Line at Sarn and Tondu.
