= Tavis Knoyle =

Wales international rugby union footballer

- Born: Tavis Knoyle; 2 June 1990 (age 36) Pontneddfechan, Powys, Wales
- Height: 185 cm (6 ft 1 in)
- Weight: 95 kg (209 lb)

Rugby union career
- Position: Scrum-half
- Current team: Merthyr RFC
Youth career
- Glynneath RFC
Senior career
Years	Team	Apps	(Points)
- Glynneath RFC
2008–2009	Neath RFC	15	(0)
2009	Ospreys	1	(0)
2009–2013	Llanelli RFC	13	(5)
2009–2013	Scarlets	66	(15)
2013–2014	Gloucester	13	(0)
2014	Cardiff Blues	32	(10)
2014–2016	Pontypridd RFC	3	(10)
2016–2022	Dragons	59	(10)
2022–	Merthyr RFC		
- Correct as of 28 December 2022
International career
Years	Team	Apps	(Points)
2006	Wales U16		
2007–2008	Wales U18		
2009	Wales U20	4	(5)
2010–2013	Wales	11	(0)
- Correct as of 28 December 2022
National sevens team
Years	Team		Comps
2013	Wales		1

Tavis Knoyle (born 2 June 1990 in Pontneddfechan, Vale of Neath, Wales) is a Wales international rugby union footballer who plays at scrum-half.

He is a fluent Welsh speaker.

== Club career ==
After a youth career at home town club Glynneath RFC, he made his senior debut at Neath RFC, and made his Celtic League debut with Ospreys in April 2009.

After impressing with Wales Under 20 squad, he joined the Scarlets at the start of the 2009/10 campaign, scoring his first try for the Scarlets in a victory over Ulster, and was awarded the Magners League Man of the Match.

On 16 May 2013, Knoyle signed to join English side Gloucester in the Aviva Premiership on a two-year contract, joining former Scarlets coach Nigel Davies who had been appointed Director of Rugby at the Kingsholm Stadium in June 2012.

On 5 February 2014, he signed an agreement to join Cardiff Blues.

Knoyle was loaned out to Pontypridd RFC 8 months later and made his debut for the club on 11 October 2014 against London Scottish in the British and Irish Cup. Knoyle played his final game for the valleys team against Connacht Eagles on 6 December 2014, before making his return to his parent regional side.

On 16 October 2016, Knoyle signed for Welsh region Dragons from the 2016–17 season. In doing so he would become only the third player to play for all four professional Welsh rugby regions.

Knoyle departed the Dragons during the 2021–22 season, joining Merthyr RFC soon after.

== International career ==
Having played for Wales at Under 16 and Under 18 levels, under the tutelage of Phil Davies he won four Wales Under 20 caps in 2009.

Knoyle was named in the squad for the 2010 Wales rugby union tour of New Zealand, making his debut against New Zealand in Dunedin on 20 June 2010 as a second-half replacement. Knoyle was named in the Welsh squad for the 2011 Six Nations Championship, winning his second cap in the clash with Scotland at Murrayfield, replacing Mike Phillips in the 76th minute.

Knoyle was selected in the Wales squad for the 2011 Rugby World Cup, starting the pool match against Namibia. A shoulder injury ruled Knoyle of the 2012 Six Nations, but he returned to the squad for the 2012 end-of-year rugby union internationals, and named to start against Argentina, displacing veteran scrum half Mike Phillips.

While selected in the squad for the 2013 Six Nations, Knoyle did not feature in any test. His final involvement with the Wales squad came during the 2013 Wales rugby union tour of Japan, coming off the bench in both tests.

Knoyle has also represented Wales Sevens in the World Rugby Sevens Series.

== External list ==
- WRU Profile
- Scarlets profile
- Dragons profile

Category;Bedwas RFC players
