= Stuart Watkins =

GB & Wales international rugby union player

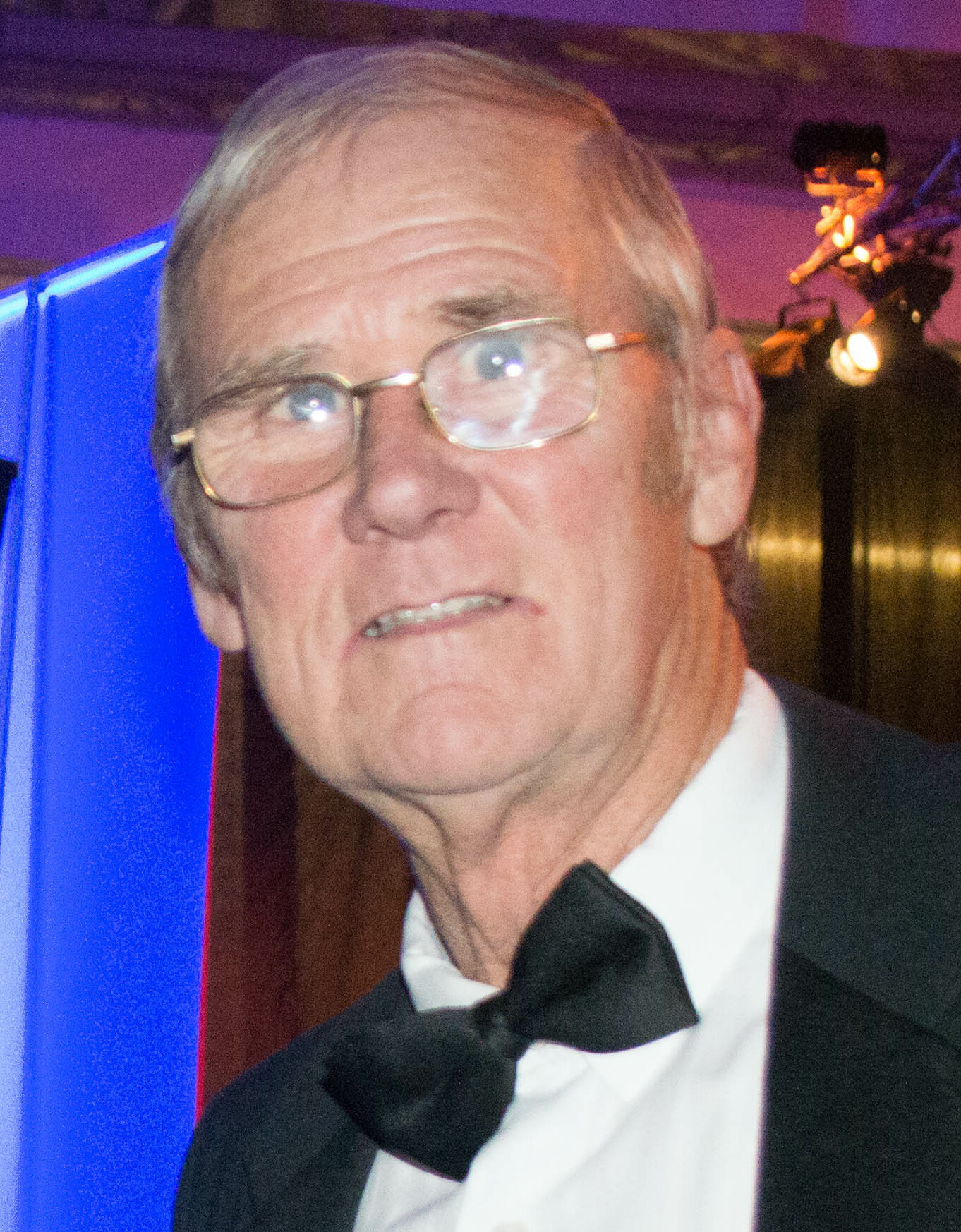
- Born: Stuart John Watkins; 5 June 1941 (age 85) Newport Wales
- Height: 6 ft 2 in (188 cm)
- Weight: 12 st 11 lb (179 lb; 81 kg)
- School: Caerleon Secondary Modern School

Rugby union career
- Position: Wing
Amateur team(s)
Years	Team	Apps	(Points)
1963	Cross Keys RFC		
1963-1969	Newport RFC		
1963-1964	Barbarian F.C.		
1970	Cardiff RFC		
International career
Years	Team	Apps	(Points)
1964-1970	Wales	26	(27)
1966	British Lions	3	(0)

Stuart Watkins (born 5 June 1941) was a Welsh international rugby union wing who played club rugby for Newport and Cardiff.

Watkins began his rugby career at Cross Keys before switching to Newport in 1963, staying with the club for the majority of his career. In 1970, in a dispute about training, Watkins left Newport to join rival club Cardiff.

== International career ==
Watkins made his international debut for Wales against Scotland on 1 February 1964. Played at the Cardiff Arms Park, it was Scotland's only defeat of the season and would be the key game in Wales winning the championship that year. Watkins would represent his country on 26 occasions, and his most notable game came against France on 26 March 1966. It was the final game of the tournament and Wales were trailing by 8 points to a team they had beaten only once in the last eight encounters. Keith Bradshaw had dragged Wales back into the game with two penalty goals when Watkins intercepted a French three quarter movement on his own 25 yard line. He raced 75 yards down the right touch line to score a memorable try that not only gave Wales the match but also the championship.

In 1966, Watkins was selected to play for the British Lions in their tour of New Zealand and Australia. Watkins would play in three of the tests.

=== International games played ===
Wales

- Australia 1966
- England 1965, 1966, 1967, 1968, 1969, 1970
- France 1964, 1965, 1966, 1967, 1969
- Ireland 1964, 1965, 1966, 1967, 1969, 1970
- New Zealand 1967, 1969
- Scotland 1964, 1965, 1966, 1967, 1968, 1969

British Lions

- Australia 1966
- New Zealand 1966, 1966

== Bibliography ==
- Godwin, Terry (1984). The International Rugby Championship 1883-1983. Grafton Street, London: Willow Books. ISBN 0-00-218060-X.
- Smith, David; Williams, Gareth (1980). Fields of Praise: The Official History of The Welsh Rugby Union. Cardiff: University of Wales Press. ISBN 0-7083-0766-3.
