= Cardiff Saracens RFC =

Rugby team in Wales

- Founded: 1966
- Location: Cardiff, Wales
- Ground: Roath Park Recreational Ground
- Chairman: Chris Parks
- President: Ray Diment
- Coach: Martin Hole
- Captain: Tommy Rowe
- League: WRU Division 5 east central 2nd

Official website
- cardiffsaracensrfc.mywru.co.uk

Cardiff Saracens Rugby Football Club was formed in 1966 when two of rugby clubs in Cardiff, Wales, amalgamated. The former clubs were Roath Park RFC (est. 1889) and Spillers RFC (est. circa 1920). The 'Sarries', as they are known locally, play in black shirts with red piping, black shorts and black socks.

The club run 1st XV team and occasionally a veterans 2nd XV which play from September 1 until May 6 every season. The club's ground is at Roath Park Recreation Ground and their clubhouse is 'The Crofts Hotel', Crofts Street, Cardiff CF24 3DZ about 10 minutes' walk from the pitch.

In 2009, having finished as runners-up in the Cardiff & District Premier Division for the previous two seasons, the club was promoted to the Welsh Rugby Union's WRU Division Six Central.

In 2013, having finished top of SWALEC Division Six South East League, club was promoted to the SWALEC Division Five South East League in the 2013–14 season.

From 2014–15 season the restructuring of the WRU rugby leagues saw the club playing in Division 3 East Central C league.

In 2016, having finished as runners-up in the Division 3 East Central C league in the 2015–16 season, the club was promoted to Division 3 East Central B.

Club sponsors for the 2016–17 season are Covert Investigations and Surveillance Ltd, Spicketts Battrick law practice and Jewson building suppliers.

2023-2024 season has seen cardiff saracens get promoted to east central 4 after captain Tommy Rowe kicked the sarries to promotion

== Club honours ==
- Division 3 East Central C League Runners-up 2015–16
- SWALEC Division Six South East League Winners 2012–13
- Cardiff District Rugby Union Premier League Runners-Up 2007–08, 2008–09
- Cardiff District Rugby Union Division 1 winners 2003–04
- Ron Lucock Cup Winners: 2000/2001
- Mallett Cup Winners: 1896 (Roath Park RFC),1927–28,1932–33,1933–34,1936–37,1938–39 (Spillers RFC)
- Ninian Stuart Cup Winners: 1953 (Roath Park RFC), 2006
- Harry Parfitt Trophy Winners: 1996
- Season 2023-2024 runners up and promoted to east central 4
