= Cwmgwrach RFC =

- Full name: Cwmgwrach Rugby Football Club
- Founded: 1906(c)
- Location: Cwmgwrach, Wales
- President: Clive Hawkes
- Coach(es): Daniel Morgan
- League(s): WRU National League, Division 3 West Central C
- 2018-19: 5th
Team kit

Official website
- www.cwmgwrachrfc.com

Cwmgwrach Rugby Football Club is a Welsh rugby union team based in Cwmgwrach, Swansea, Wales. The club is a member of the Welsh Rugby Union and is a feeder club for the Ospreys.

Photographic evidence of the existence of Cwmgwrach RFC places the team as playing during the 1909/10 season, though it is believed the team first played three or four years before this date. There was no clubhouse during this period, so the team used local public houses as a meeting point and switched between eight different local playing grounds; until after losing their final local ground to developers played all matches away for six years. When the team finally secured a temporary playing ground in 1926 they hosted Llangarw. In the early 1930s it was suggested the team gained their own permanent ground, which took the leveling of a side of one of the local hills to achieve. This was completed in 1934, and a clubhouse was added in 1937. In 1949 the club applied for, and was successful in gaining, membership to the Welsh Rugby Union.

After joining the West Wales Rugby Union in the 1987/88 season the club quickly moved through the divisions until after yet another league change by the WRU, Cwmgwrach found themselves in the WRU Division Six Central League.

The club holds very close ties with Scottish team Lasswade Rugby Football Club, with whom they play an annual home and away friendly between the two clubs. This has occurred since the 1963/64 season and continues to this day.

== Notable past players ==
- (Wales) David Richards, Lyn Powell (Swansea), Clive Williams (Aberavon, WALES Youth).

== Club honours ==
- Glamorgan County Silver Ball Trophy 1965/66 - Winners
- Welsh Brewers League Bowl 1991/92 - Winners
