= Cefn Cribwr RFC =

Cefn Cribwr RFC is a rugby union club based in the village of Cefn Cribwr near Bridgend. They currently play in WRU Division Five South Central and run a senior and a youth team.

== Past players of note ==
- (Wales) Keith Bradshaw

== Website ==
https://web.archive.org/web/20101212063636/http://www.pitchero.com/clubs/cefncribwr/
