= Bryncethin RFC =

- Full name: Bryncethin Rugby Football Club
- Founded: 1890
- Location: Bryncethin, Wales
- League(s): WRU Division Five South Central
- 2009-10: 3rd
Team kit

Official website
- www.bryncethinrugby.com

Bryncethin Rugby Football Club is a Welsh rugby union team based in Bryncethin, South Wales. Formed in 1890, the club is a member of the Welsh Rugby Union and presently play in the WRU Division Five South Central.

== Club history ==
Formed in 1890, Bryncethin quickly achieved WRU membership and by the turn of the century were represented in club competitions. In 1903 the club reached the final of a South Wales Cup, losing to a far more well established club, Llwynypia RFC. After the First World War, the club played at Pandy Park, under the promotion of a group of local businessmen.

In 1924 the club was represented at an international level for the first time, when Ivor Thomas was selected to play for Wales against England in the Five Nations Championship. Thomas only won the one cap, but later went on to play for Bridgend and Cardiff.

In the late 1920s the club relinquished their WRU status, but continued playing as Bryncethin United, but after the Second World War the club reformed and again sought, and were awarded, WRU membership.

== Notable past players ==
- (Wales) Ivor Thomas 1 cap
- Hugh Williams-Jones
- Gwyn Richards
- Peter Rogers
- Owen Watkin
