= Dai Edwards =

Wales dual-code international rugby footballer

- Born: David Edwards; 21 March 1896 Glynneath, Neath Port Talbot, Wales
- Died: 24 August 1960 (aged 64) Glynneath, Wales
- Occupation(s): labourer, collier

Rugby union career
- Position: Forward
Senior career
Years	Team	Apps	(Points)
–	Neath RFC		
–	Glynneath RFC		
–	Rhigos RFC		
International career
Years	Team	Apps	(Points)
1921	Wales	1	(0)
- Rugby league career

Playing information
- Position: Forward
Club
Years	Team	Pld	T	G	FG	P
	Rochdale Hornets
Representative
Years	Team	Pld	T	G	FG	P
1923–25	Wales	2				0
1926	Other Nationalities	1				0

David "Dai" Edwards (21 March 1896 – 24 August 1960) was an international rugby forward who played rugby union for Glynneath and rugby league with Rochdale Hornets. He won a single cap for Wales under the rugby union code and then represented his country at rugby league in two matches between 1923 and 1925.

== Rugby career ==
Edwards' rugby career was interrupted by the outbreak of World War I, in which Edwards fought for his country serving in the Welsh Guards. On the resumption of club rugby in 1919, Edwards rejoined his local team Glynneath, and was given the captaincy of the club in the 1919/1920 season. He retained the captaincy the following season, and in 1921 he won his first and only international cap as a rugby union player. Edwards won his cap for the opening game of the 1921 Five Nations Championship, an encounter with England at Twickenham. Wales suffered from several injuries to players during the game and were comprehensively beaten. Edwards was not reselected for any of the remaining games of the tournament.

In 1921, Edwards surrendered his amateur status by joining professional rugby league team, Rochdale Hornets. His first match for the Hornets was on 27 August against Swinton. He won two rugby league caps for Wales as a rugby league international, both games against England in 1923 and in 1925. Edwards played at second-row in Rochdale Hornets' 10–9 victory over Hull F.C. in the 1922 Challenge Cup Final during the 1921–22 season at Headingley, Leeds on Saturday 6 May 1922, in front of a crowd of 32,596. Returning to Wales in the late 1920s, he coached Rhigos RFC, until he was stopped by the Welsh Rugby Union due to his background as a professional league player. He was however allowed to play for Rhigos during the Second World War.

=== International matches played ===
Wales (rugby union)

- England 1921

Wales (rugby league)

- England 1923, 1925

== Bibliography ==
- Gate, Robert (1986). Gone North: Volume 1. Ripponden: R.E. Gate. ISBN 0-9511190-0-1.
- Godwin, Terry (1984). The International Rugby Championship 1883-1983. Grafton Street, London: Willow Books. ISBN 0-00-218060-X.
- Jenkins, John M.; et al. (1991). Who's Who of Welsh International Rugby Players. Wrexham: Bridge Books. ISBN 1-872424-10-4.
