= Glynneath RFC =

Welsh rugby union club, based in Glynneath

(Wales) Glynneath RFC
- Founded: 1889; 137 years ago
- Location: Glynneath, Wales
- Ground: Abernant Park
- Chairman: Morgan Francis
- Coach(es): Grant Bignell , Jack O'Reilly , Gerallt Lewis
- League: WRU Championship West
Team kit

Official website
- www.glynneathrfc.com

Glynneath RFC are a Welsh Rugby Union club playing in WRU Championship West of the WRU National Leagues. The Club has won a number of honours over the years, including the locally famous Invincibles of the 1961–62 season captained by Bas Thomas.

Playing out of Abernant Park in red and black jerseys, the Club has one senior teams and six junior sides. Famous sons of Glynneath RFC include David Weaver, David Richards, Dai Morris and Tavis Knoyle.

== History ==
=== Early history ===
Glynneath RFC was founded in the 1889-90 season. According to Gwilym R Davies, Will Jones, son of the Landlord of the Angel Hotel, introduced the game to the village in 1880. Two local sides were set up - the 'Woollen Factory' and the 'Lamb & Flag'. Glynneath RFC was formed in 1889 and captained by Will Jones.

The club moved to its current home at Abernant Park in 1901. In common with many other clubs, no rugby was played in the years 1904-5 and 1905-6 due to the Religious Revival. The 1909-10 season saw Glynneath RFC admitted as a member of the Welsh Rugby Union.

The Golden Period (1919-1922) saw Glynneath finish with the following record: Played 129, Won 86, Drawn 27, Lost 16. The 1921-22 season also saw the formation of the first Juniors team who wore a black and white strip. However, the team disbanded after three seasons. The same season also saw the introduction of a reserve team, which disbanded four years later.

Following on from the Second World War, Glynneath RFC decided in the summer of 1944 that they were to reform. A meeting was held and a committee was formed. The club sought permission for the use of Abernant Park and the opportunity to buy new balls and 17 jerseys at a cost of £11-13-6 plus 4 coupons each. Goal posts and a first-aid kit were also purchased. New rules were also introduced, such as, any Committee member absent four times from meetings without reasonable excuse would be automatically expelled.

=== Hawick Association ===
The first visit of Hawick Trades took place in 1956 - a fixture that still continues to this day. Following a conversation between Rees Thomas (GRFC Fixture Secretary) and Bert Miller, Mr Thomas was put in touch with John Imrie of Hawick Trades. The two teams battle it out each year for the Andrew Deans Challenge Cup.

It was decided in 1959 that Glynneath RFC should seek out a permanent clubhouse, as they had previously been using The Rock Hotel. Abernant House was purchased for the sum of £4,000. A further £10,000 was spent on the premises to transform it into a spacious modern rugby club. It was officially opened on 7 October 1959.

=== The Invincibles ===
Probably the most well-known era of the club was the 'Invincible Season' in 1961-62. The team, captained by Bas Thomas, played a total of 41 games in that season, winning 37 and drawing just 4 fixtures. They also won the Championship Cup, League Shield and Silver Ball Trophy. This run also continued for 11 games in the following season until they were defeated by St Luke's College (Exeter). Including the 1960-61 season, Glynneath RFC went on a run of 55 games unbeaten.

1964 saw wholesale changes in Glynneath's facilities - with the building of a grandstand, an extension to the clubhouse, and the installation of floodlights. The official opening took place on 22 December 1964. However, a black day in the club's history occurred in 1977 when the dance hall was completely gutted by a fire. The clubhouse was reopened in 1980 following a massive fund-raising effort by the club to repair the hall.

The 1980s saw the introduction of The Valley Shield (1985–86) - a game between Glynneath and Cwmgrwach in memory of Gareth Thomas. Glynneath won the fixture 18-3. It also saw the Glynneath Athletic XV win Division B of the Neath & District Championship, the annual Neath & District RU 7-a-side tournament at Abernant Park, and the Courage Wales League Cup. The following season saw the First XV win the O G Davies 7-a-side tournament.

=== The League Climb ===
Glynneath RFC were accepted as members of the Welsh Brewers West Wales Championship League in 1987-88, competing in Section F. They finished their league campaign unbeaten and set two new records - WWWRU Cup for most tries (105) and the Eurof Davies Shield for most points (564). Further success came through the winning of the O G Davies Merit table and the Wood & Elkias Trophy. They went on to win Section E in the following season, and also enjoyed a successful run in the Schweppes Cup beating Maesteg en route to their 5th Round exit against Bridgend. They were also awarded the Team of the Round Trophy for the victory over Maesteg. They also broke their own record during the season with 129 tries and 676 points.

During the centenary season of 1989-90, Glynneath RFC finished as Runners Up of Section D ensuring their constant rise up the leagues. The run continued when they were crowned Champions of Section C (1990–91), Section B (1991–92) and Section A (1993–94). The club also won the Tovali Cup the 1990-91 season. They were the last team to win Section A, and went on to win a Heineken League play-off against Cardigan which placed Glynneath in Division 3.

Probably the biggest game at Abernant Park took place on 28 January 1995, when they took on Llanelli in the SWALEC Cup. The strong players Nigel Davies, Rupert Moon, Robin McBryde, Craig Quinnell and Phil Davies, and others, played for Llanelli. The game also saw the return from injury of Ieuan Evans. A crowd of 3,000 and a camera crew were present during the wet and windy conditions to see Llanelli win by 27-0.

=== The New Millennium ===
The turn of the Millennium saw the club re-introduce a number of Junior squads as well as the reformation of the youth squad. In 2006, the youth team brought a long-awaited piece of silverware to the club in the form of the Welsh Youth Cup, which saw them defeat Rumney Youth at the Millennium Stadium running out 14-10 winners. Points scorers on the day were Ben Powell (try), David Price (two pens) and Greg Roberts (one pen).

In the 2007-08 season, the club became champions of Division Four South West at Brynamman after a brace from centre Wyn Thomas, ensuring the club finished top with two games to spare. The season also saw the Youth team finish as Runners-Up in the Afan-Nedd District Cup.

The club's president is popular entertainer Max Boyce.

== Club honours ==
- Invincible Season (1961–62)
- Tovali Cup Winners (1990–91)
- Glamorgan County Silver Ball Trophy (1960–61, 1961–62, 1962–63, 2011–12, 2013–14)
- West Wales record for tries in a season (129)
- Section F Winners (1987–88)
- Section E Winners (1988–89)
- Section D Runners Up(1989–90)
- Section C Winners (1990–91)
- Section B Winners (1991–92)
- Section A Winners (1993–94)
- Welsh Youth Cup Winners (2005–06)
- WRU Division Four South West Champions (2007–08)
- WRU Division Three South West Champions (2010–11)
- WRU Division Two West Champions (2011–12)
- Brains SA Bowl Winners (2009–10)

== Management ==
Name	Position
Grant Bignell	Forwards Coach
Jack O’Reilly	Backs Coach
Bryan Jones	Team Manager
Leeane Jones	Physiotherapist
Gerallt Lewis	Analysis Coach
Gareth Hawks	Touch Judge

== International caps ==
- (Wales) Tom Arthur
- (Wales) Don Devereux
- (Wales) Dai Edwards
- (Wales) T.C. Lloyd
- (Wales) Dai Morris
- (Wales) Dai Prosser
- (Wales) Glyn Prosser
- (Wales) David Richards
- (Wales) David Weaver
- (Wales) Tavis Knoyle

Kieran Williams

== Other notable players ==
- (Wales) Chris Ball
- (Wales) David Morgan Evans
- (Wales) Howell Jones
- (Wales) Thomas John Lloyd
- (Wales) Emlyn Walters
- (Wales) Dai Wilkins (Commonwealth Games bowls medallist)

James Parry

Johnny Griff
