= Howie Jones (rugby union) =

Welsh rugby union player (1907–1983)

- Full name: Elwyn Howel Jones
- Born: 8 September 1907 Neath, Wales
- Died: 4 May 1983 (aged 75) Porthcawl, Wales
- Notable relative: Howell Jones (father)

Rugby union career
- Position: Wing
International career
Years	Team	Apps	(Points)
1930	Wales	2	(3)

Elwyn Howel Jones (8 September 1907 — 4 May 1983) was a Welsh international rugby union player.

Hailing from Pontneddfechan, Jones was the son of Wales forward Howell Jones and attended Neath County School. He earned representative honours for Wales Elementary Schools and Wales Secondary Schools in the early 1920s, while his earliest senior rugby was with Neath Wanderers, which he captained for two seasons.

Jones, a wing three-quarter joined Swansea at the end of 1929, and was made a Wales reserve for the 1930 Five Nations, aided by a five-try performance against Skewen. He got his first cap in Wales' third fixture, against Ireland at Swansea, when Ronnie Boon withdrew with illness, then was capped again for the final match in France.

== See also ==
- List of Wales national rugby union players
