= Howell Jones =

Wales international rugby union footballer

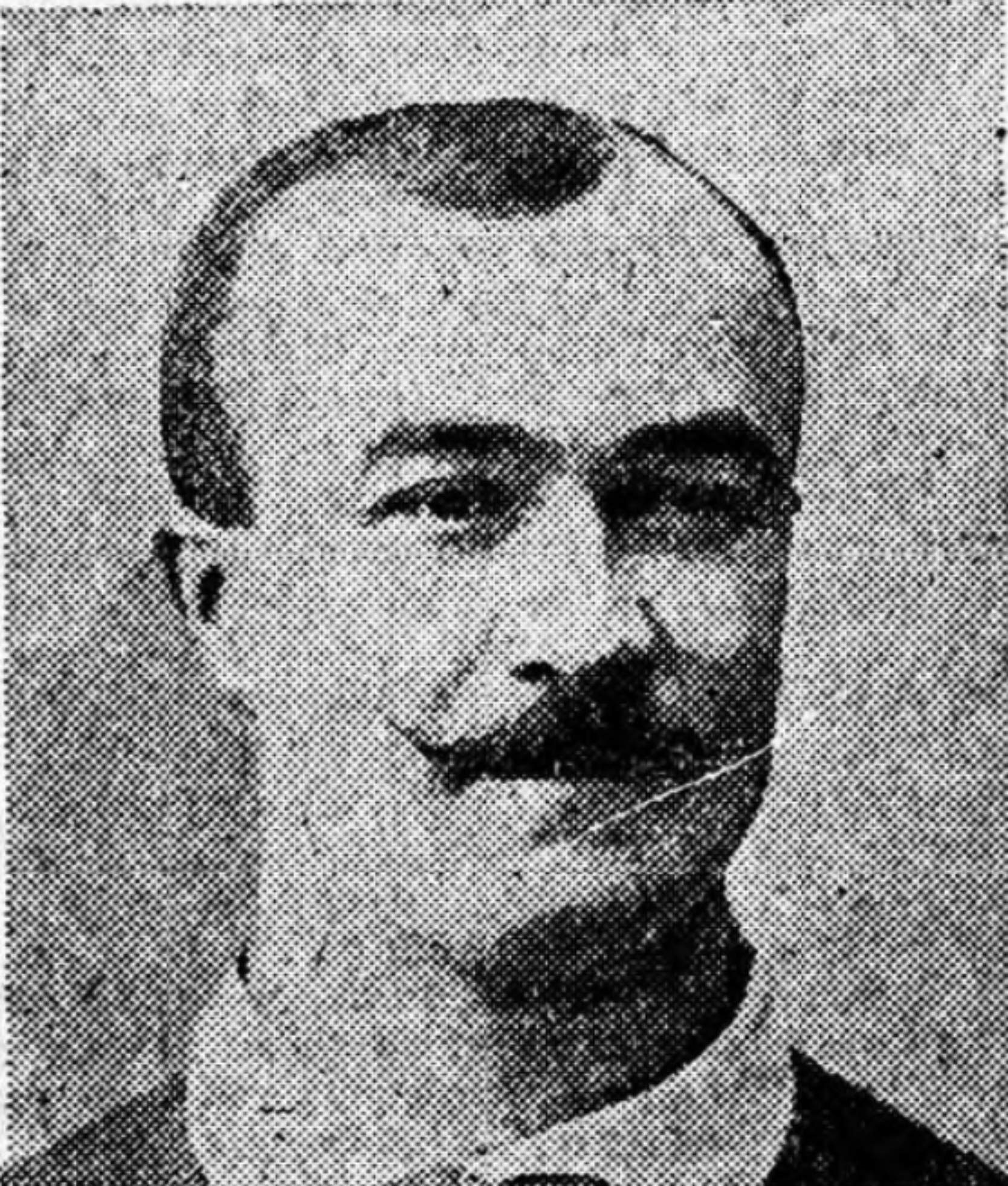
- Howel Jones 1882-1908
- Born: Howell Jones; 5 April 1882 Pontneddfechan, Powys, Wales
- Died: 1 December 1908 (aged 26) Neath, Wales
- School: Neath Intermediate School
- Notable relative(s): Howie Jones, son
- Occupation: surveyor

Rugby union career
- Position: Forward
Amateur team(s)
Years	Team	Apps	(Points)
- Glynneath RFC
–	Neath Excelsiors		
–	Neath RFC		
–	Glamorgan		
International career
Years	Team	Apps	(Points)
1904	Wales	1	(0)

Howell Jones (5 April 1882 - 1 December 1908) was a Welsh rugby union forward who played for the rugby club Neath and county rugby for Glamorgan. He gained just a single cap for the Wales national team in 1904. Jones came from a sporting family, and his son, Howie Jones, also represented Wales in rugby union.

== Rugby career ==
Jones first played rugby for his local school before joining Glynneath. Like many successful players from the area, once Jones had been noticed as a rugby talent, he progressed to Neath RFC, the most notable club in the region. In the 1903-04 season, Neath made Jones the captain of the Neath senior XV. As captain of Neath, Jones was selected for his one and only international appearance, playing for Wales in the country's final game of the 1904 Home Nations Championship. Wales had already played England and Scotland, registering a draw and a win, meaning a win over Ireland would give Wales the possibility of winning the Championship. The Welsh selectors had brought in new capped players throughout the campaign and the final game was no exception. Jones was one of three players who were representing Wales for the first time during the Irish game and the tenth of the tournament. All three new caps were in the forward positions, and Jones was joined by Newport's Charlie Pritchard and Sid Bevan from Swansea. The game ended controversially, with the match referee blames for allowing Ireland a try from an illegal forward pass, and then denying Welsh wing Dick Jones a winning try. Wales finished the 1904 Championship in second and Jones was never selected to play for Wales again.

Jones came from a sporting family, and his brothers William (Bill) and Idris both played for the Neath first XV. Bill, like Jones, captained Neath, but he held the position for three seasons from 1910 to 1913. Jones' son, Elwyn Howel "Howie" Jones like his father played for Neath, but also represented Swansea and Aberavon; and in 1930 played in two Welsh internationals.

Howel Jones died on the rugby pitch from a kick to the spleen in 1908. His son, also called Howel ( Howie) played for Wales.

=== International games played ===
Wales

- Ireland 1904

== Bibliography ==
- Jenkins, John M.; et al. (1991). Who's Who of Welsh International Rugby Players. Wrexham: Bridge Books. ISBN 1-872424-10-4.
- Smith, David; Williams, Gareth (1980). Fields of Praise: The Official History of The Welsh Rugby Union. Cardiff: University of Wales Press. ISBN 0-7083-0766-3.
