= St Bride's Minor =

St Bride's Minor: Welsh: Llansanffraid-ar-Ogwr
- Location within Bridgend
- Population: 6,014 (2011)
- OS grid reference: SS902827
- Community: St Bride's Minor
- Principal area: Bridgend
- Preserved county: Mid Glamorgan
- Country: Wales
- Sovereign state: United Kingdom
- Post town: BRIDGEND
- Postcode district: CF32
- Dialling code: 01656
- Police: South Wales
- Fire: South Wales
- Ambulance: Welsh
- UK Parliament: Bridgend
- Senedd Cymru – Welsh Parliament: Bridgend
- List of places UK Wales Bridgend 51.532910°N 3.583582°W Map of the community

St Bride's Minor (Welsh: Llansanffraid-ar-Ogwr) is a community in Bridgend County Borough, south Wales. Located north of Bridgend town it is made up of Sarn, a large housing estate, and the villages of Bryncethin and Abergarw. The southern border of the community is defined by the M4 motorway, though the community stretches briefly beyond the Motorway to take in the McArthurGlen Designer Outlet. The eastern, and largest area of the community consists of farmland and small scattered farm houses. At the 2001 census, the community's population was 5,575, increasing to 6,014 at the 2011 Census.

At the local level St Bride's Minor is governed by St Bride's Minor Community Council, electing up to thirteen community councillors.

Before 2022 St Bride's Minor community was a ward of Bridgend County Borough Council. Since 2022 it has been a part of 'St Bride's Minor and Ynysawdre' ward, electing three Councillors.

Bride's Minor was a part of Ogwr Borough and the county of Mid Glamorgan until both authorities were abolished in 1996.
