= David Weaver (rugby union) =

Welsh rugby player (born 1942)

- Full name: David Samuel Weaver
- Born: 8 January 1942 (age 84) Glynneath, Wales

Rugby union career
- Position: Wing
International career
Years	Team	Apps	(Points)
1964	Wales	1	(0)

David Samuel Weaver (born 8 January 1942) is a Welsh former international rugby union player.

A product of Glynneath RFC, Weaver won a solitary Wales cap in his first season with Swansea. He played the 1964 Five Nations tournament opener for Wales against England at Twickenham, which finished in a draw.

Weaver was in the Swansea side that beat the touring 1966–67 Wallabies and later represented Zambia.

== See also ==
- List of Wales national rugby union players
