= Ynysawdre =

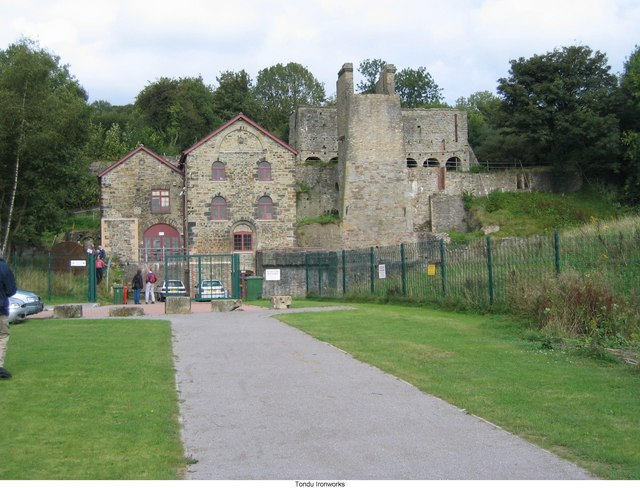
- Tondu Ironworks

- Location within Bridgend
- Population: 3,367 2011
- OS grid reference: SS900845
- Community: Ynysawdre
- Principal area: Bridgend
- Preserved county: Mid Glamorgan
- Country: Wales
- Sovereign state: United Kingdom
- Post town: BRIDGEND
- Postcode district: CF32 9
- Dialling code: 01656
- Police: South Wales
- Fire: South Wales
- Ambulance: Welsh
- UK Parliament: Bridgend
- Senedd Cymru – Welsh Parliament: Ogmore
- List of places UK Wales Bridgend 51.547150°N 3.588900°W Map of the community

Ynysawdre is a small community in Bridgend County Borough, south Wales. It is located to the east of Aberkenfig in Wales, and comprises the two villages of Tondu and Brynmenyn. The name Ynysawdre is also usually used for a small section of Tondu. At the 2001 census, the population of the community was 3,698, reducing to 3,367 at the 2011 Census.

== Buildings of note ==
The community of Ynysawdre is home to several notable buildings. Tondu Ironworks is an important remnant of Britain's industrial heritage. Built in 1820 by Sir Robert Price, the ironworks, although derelict, still survive as a series of large roofless stone buildings. Structures surviving include the charging bank, the blast-engine house, a range of seven iron ore calcining kilns, each 62 ft by 32 ft in size, and over a hundred beehive-shaped coking kilns. The calcining and coking kilns are rare surviving examples of the thousands of kilns once found throughout Britain.

Other notable remains from the area's industrial past include Aberkenfig Railway Bridge and Glan-Rhyd Railway Viaduct, two horse-drawn railway bridges, both built in the 1920s.

== Education ==
Ynysawdre is home to Coleg Cymunedol Y Dderwen, a large English-medium comprehensive school which serves the Garw and Ogmore valleys. Y Dderwen was formerly the two schools of Ynysawdre School and Ogmore School; Ynysawdre was based on Y Dderwen's current site and Ogmore School was based in the nearby village of Bryncethin. Y Dderwen's new building opened in 2013.

The community was also home to Archbishop McGrath Catholic High School until mid-2011, when it relocated to a new building in Brackla. The school served the entire county borough.

Ynysawdre is also home to Brynmenyn Primary School, a small school with its own nursery. Tondu Primary School is located in the village of Aberkenfig.

== Sport ==
Ynysawdre is the location of Pandy Park, home of Tondu RFC. Pandy Park houses numerous football and rugby pitches. Ynysawdre Pool and Fitness Centre is located on Heol-Yr-Ysgol, one of the main roads.

== Governance ==
At the local level Ynysawdre has a community council, comprising up to ten community councillors elected (or co-opted) from the community wards of Tondu and Brynmenyn.

Ynysawdre was also an ward electing a county councillor to Bridgend County Borough Council. Since 1995 the ward had been represented by the Labour Party. In January 2019 a consultation period began, to review the wards and representation in the county. The proposals included merging the Ynysawdre ward with neighbouring Sarn. From the 2022 local elections Ynysawdre became part of the 'St Bride's Minor and Ynysawdre' ward, which also covers the community of St Bride's Minor. The ward elects three county councillors.

== See also ==
- Ynysawdre Comprehensive School
