= WRU Division Six Central =

Welsh rugby union league

- Founded: 2007
- No. of teams: 10
- Country: Wales
- Most recent champion: Glyncoch RFC (2009–10)
- Level on pyramid: 7
- Promotion to: WRU Division Five South West, WRU Division Five South East, WRU Division Five South Central
- Website: www.wru.co.uk/14793_14815.php

The Welsh Rugby Union Division Six Central (also called the SWALEC Division Six Central for sponsorship reasons) is a rugby union league in Wales first implemented for the 2007/08 season.

== Competition ==
There are 10 clubs in the WRU Division Six Central. During the course of a season (which lasts from September to May) each club plays the others twice, once at their home ground and once at the home ground of their opponents for a total of 18 games for each club, with a total of 90 games in each season. Teams receive four points for a win and two point for a draw, an additional bonus point is awarded to either team if they score four tries or more in a single match. No points are awarded for a loss though the losing team can gain a bonus point for finishing the match within seven points of the winning team. Teams are ranked by total points, then the number of tries scored and then points difference. At the end of each season, the club with the most points is crowned as champion. If points are equal the tries scored then points difference determines the winner.

=== Sponsorship ===
In 2008 the Welsh Rugby Union announced a new sponsorship deal for the club rugby leagues with SWALEC valued at £1 million (GBP). The initial three year sponsorship was extended at the end of the 2010/11 season, making SWALEC the league sponsors until 2015. The leagues sponsored are the WRU Divisions one through to seven.

- (2007-2008) No sponsor as league created during sponsorship term.
- (2008-2015) SWALEC

== 2010/2011 Season ==
=== League teams ===
- Aberavon Naval Club
- Caereu Ely RFC
- Cambrian Welfare RFC
- Cardiff Saracens RFC
- CRC Caerdydd RFC
- Glyncoch RFC
- Llandrindod Wells RFC
- Llanrumney RFC
- Pontrhydyfen RFC
- Ynysowen RFC

=== League table ===
2010-2011 WRU Division Six Central League Table
Club	Played	Won	Drawn	Lost	Points for	Points against	Tries For	Tries Against	Try Bonus	Losing Bonus	Points
Caerau Ely RFC	1	1	0	0	28	13	5	1	1	0	5
Pontrhydyfen RFC	1	1	0	0	38	3	4	0	1	0	5
Cardiff Saracens RFC	1	1	0	0	34	8	4	1	1	0	5
Cambrian Welfare RFC	1	1	0	0	35	10	4	2	1	0	5
Clwb Rygbi Cymru Caerdydd RFC	1	1	0	0	10	8	1	1	0	0	4
Glyncoch RFC	1	0	0	1	8	10	1	1	0	1	1
Ynysowen RFC	1	0	0	1	13	28	1	5	0	0	0
Llanrumney RFC	1	0	0	1	10	35	2	4	0	0	0
Llandrindod Wells RFC	1	0	0	1	8	34	1	4	0	0	0
Aberavon Naval RFC	1	0	0	1	3	38	0	4	0	0	0
Correct as of 6 September 2010

== 2009/2010 Season ==
=== League teams ===
- Aberavon Naval Club
- Caereu Ely RFC
- Cambrian Welfare RFC
- Cardiff Saracens RFC
- CRC Caerdydd RFC
- Glyncoch RFC
- Llandrindod Wells RFC
- Llanrumney RFC
- Pontrhydyfen RFC
- Ynysowen RFC

=== League table ===
2009-2010 WRU Division Six Central League Table
Club	Played	Won	Drawn	Lost	Points for	Points against	Tries For	Tries Against	Try Bonus	Losing Bonus	Points
Glyncoch RFC	18	16	0	2	521	155	76	15	7	0	71
Clwb Rygbi Cymru Caerdydd RFC	18	14	0	4	496	252	64	33	9	2	67
Llanrumney RFC	18	12	0	6	555	209	79	24	9	5	62
Cambrian Welfare RFC	18	12	0	6	514	202	74	22	7	3	58
Caerau Ely RFC	18	9	1	8	251	263	32	30	1	5	44
Ynysowen RFC	18	8	0	10	400	202	54	24	4	5	41
Cardiff Saracens RFC	18	6	1	11	247	347	35	42	4	3	33
Llandrindod Wells RFC	18	6	1	11	233	415	30	60	3	4	33
Aberavon Naval RFC	18	4	1	13	169	742	16	111	0	1	19
Pontrhydyfen RFC	18	1	0	17	170	769	19	118	1	4	9
Correct as of 5 August 2010

== 2008/2009 Season ==
=== League teams ===
- Bryncethin RFC
- Caereu Ely RFC
- Cambrian Welfare RFC
- CRC Caerdydd RFC
- Glyncoch RFC
- Llandrindod Wells RFC
- Llanrumney RFC
- Ynysowen RFC
- Wattstown RFC

=== League table ===
2008-2009 WRU Division Six Central League Table
Club	Played	Won	Drawn	Lost	Points for	Points against	Points difference	Tries For	Tries Against	Try Bonus	Losing Bonus	Points
Wattstown RFC	16	16	0	0	361	117	+244	39	14	5	0	69
Bryncethin RFC	16	12	0	4	306	184	+122	41	26	6	2	56
CRC Caerdydd RFC	16	11	0	5	280	197	+83	39	23	4	1	49
Cambrian Welfare RFC	16	7	1	8	336	209	+127	49	20	5	6	41
Glyncoch RFC	16	6	0	10	206	248	-42	25	31	1	6	31
Llanrumney RFC	16	5	1	10	277	304	-27	36	38	3	3	28
Ynysowen RFC	16	5	0	11	240	339	-99	28	49	0	3	23
Caerau Ely RFC	16	4	0	12	163	273	-110	21	33	2	4	22
Llandrindod Wells RFC	16	5	0	11	155	453	-298	18	62	0	1	21
Correct as of 2009-04-05

== 2007/2008 Season ==
=== League teams ===
- Bryncethin RFC
- Caereu Ely RFC
- Cambrian Welfare RFC
- CRC Caerdydd RFC
- Glyncoch RFC
- Llandrindod Wells RFC
- Llanrumney RFC
- Sulley Sports RFC
- Ynysowen RFC
- Wattstown RFC

=== League table ===
2007-2008 WRU Division Six Central League Table
Club	Played	Won	Drawn	Lost	Points for	Points against	Points difference	Tries For	Tries Against	Try Bonus	Losing Bonus	Points
Bryncethin RFC	18	14	0	4	533	227	+306	76	28	9	2	67
Cambrian Welfare RFC	18	14	0	4	448	198	+250	62	20	6	1	63
Glyncoch RFC	18	13	0	5	407	252	+155	59	27	6	0	58
Ynysowen RFC	18	12	0	6	367	242	+125	44	33	6	2	56
Wattstown RFC	18	9	0	9	420	272	+148	56	34	6	4	46
CRC Caerdydd RFC	18	8	2	8	327	314	+13	47	46	6	1	43
Llanrumney RFC	18	8	2	8	383	375	+8	54	51	3	2	41
Caereu Ely RFC	18	6	1	11	256	332	-76	33	45	2	4	32
Llandrindod Wells RFC	18	3	1	14	216	351	-135	23	46	1	3	18
Sulley Sports RFC	18	0	0	18	94	888	-794	10	134	0	1	1
Correct as of 2008-04-27
