= David Morgan Evans =

Wales international rugby league footballer

David Evans
Personal information
- Full name: David Morgan Evans
- Born: 21 April 1911 Glynneath, Wales
- Died: 24 May 1941 (aged 30) HMS Hood, Denmark Strait, off Greenland

Playing information

Rugby union
- Position: Forwards
Club
Years	Team	Pld	T	G	FG	P
≤1933–≤33	Glynneath RFC
≤1933–≥34	Neath RFC
	Total	0	0	0	0	0

Rugby league
- Position: Prop
Club
Years	Team	Pld	T	G	FG	P
≤1936–≥36	Huddersfield
Representative
Years	Team	Pld	T	G	FG	P
1936	Wales	2
- Military career
- Allegiance: United Kingdom
- Branch: Royal Navy
- Service years: -1941
- Rank: Stoker Second Class
- Service number: P/KX 108911
- Conflicts: Second World War: Atlantic War; Operation Rheinübung; Battle of the Denmark Strait †

David Morgan Evans (21 April 1911 – 24 May 1941) was a Welsh rugby union, and professional rugby league footballer who played in the 1930s. He played club level rugby union (RU) for Glynneath RFC and Neath RFC, as a forward, and representative level rugby league (RL) for Wales, and at club level for Huddersfield, as a prop.

== Background ==
David Evans was born in Glynneath, Wales, he joined the Royal Navy as a stoker 2nd Class during World War II, and died aged 30 in the Denmark Strait, between Iceland and Greenland, when HMS Hood was sunk in the Battle of the Denmark Strait by the German battleship Bismarck on Saturday 24 May 1941.

== Playing career ==
=== International honours ===
David Evans had an unsuccessful trial for Wales (RU), but won caps for Wales (RL) while at Huddersfield in the 3–2 victory over England at Taff Vale Park, Pontypridd, on Saturday 7 November, and in the 9–3 victory over France at Stade de Paris on Sunday 6 December 1936.

=== County Cup Final appearances ===
David Evans played at prop in Huddersfield's 18–10 victory over Hull F.C. in the 1938 Yorkshire Cup Final during the 1938–39 season at Odsal Stadium, Bradford on Saturday 22 October 1938.
