= Don Devereux =

Wales international rugby union & league footballer

- Born: Donald Brian Devereux; 18 October 1932 Neath, Wales
- Died: 8 February 1995 (aged 62) Resolven, Wales
- Height: 6 ft 01 in (185 cm)
- Weight: 13 st 8 lb (190 lb; 86 kg)
- School: Glynneath School
- University: St. Luke's College, Exeter
- Occupation: teacher

Rugby union career
- Position: Prop
Senior career
Years	Team	Apps	(Points)
–	Glynneath RFC		
–	Neath RFC		
–	London Welsh RFC		
–	Exeter Chiefs		
International career
Years	Team	Apps	(Points)
1958	Wales	3	(0)
- Rugby league career

Playing information
- Position: Second-row
Club
Years	Team	Pld	T	G	FG	P
1958–63	Huddersfield RLFC

Don Devereux (18 October, 1932 – 8 February 1995) was a Welsh international prop who played rugby union for Neath and rugby league for Huddersfield. He won three caps for the Wales rugby union team and also represented Wales at schools and youth level.

== Rugby career ==
Devereux was born in Neath, but played for second class team Glynneath before moving to one of Wales's biggest clubs Neath. Devereux made his Wales début against the 1958 touring Australian team, and the next year played in two games in the 1958 Five Nations Championship under the captaincy of Clem Thomas. Of the three games Devereux played he was never on the losing side, with Wales winning two of the matches, and drawing one against England. In 1958, Devereux ended his rugby union international career by switching to the professional rugby league team Huddersfield.

Devereux played at second-row in Huddersfield's 10–16 defeat by Wakefield Trinity in the 1960 Yorkshire Cup Final during the 1960–61 season at Headingley, Leeds on Saturday 29 October 1960.

Devereux returned to Wales in 1963 to take up a teaching post. He coached rugby union at Mountain Ash Grammar School in the 1970s. He built a sound reputation as a schoolboy rugby coach, and later became coach of the Welsh Secondary Schools squad, but objections were raised regarding his past associations with rugby league and Devereux relinquished his role.

== International matches played ==
Wales

- Australia 1958
- England 1958
- Scotland 1958

== Bibliography ==
- Smith, David; Williams, Gareth (1980). Fields of Praise: The Official History of The Welsh Rugby Union. Cardiff: University of Wales Press. ISBN 0-7083-0766-3.
