= Baglan RFC =

(Wales) Baglan RFC
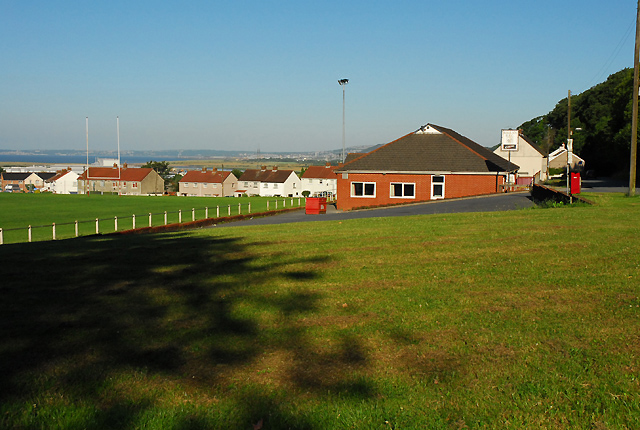
- Full name: Baglan Rugby Football Club
- Location: Baglan, Wales
- Ground: Ty-isaf Field
- President: Terry Hampton
- League: WRU Division Five South Central
- 2009-10: 4th
Team kit

Baglan Rugby Football Club is a Welsh rugby union team based in Baglan, Port Talbot, Wales, UK. The club is a member of the Welsh Rugby Union and is a feeder club for the Ospreys.
