= Pyle RFC =

Welsh rugby union club, based in Pyle, Bridgend

(Wales) Pyle RFC
- Full name: Pyle Rugby Football Club
- Nickname: The Pigs
- Location: Pyle, Wales
- Ground: Brynglas Field
- Coach: Gareth Cox
- Captain: Lee Radford
- League: WRU Division Two West Central
- 2021/22: 8th

Pyle Rugby Football Club is a Welsh rugby union team based in Pyle, Wales, UK. The club is a member of the Welsh Rugby Union and is a feeder club for the Ospreys.

In the 1920s, Jack Bassett, later the Wales captain, would play for the club before moving to Penarth. In the 1970s Pyle won the Glamorgan County Silver Ball Trophy on two occasions.

== Club honours ==
- 1975-76 Glamorgan County Silver Ball Trophy - Winners
- 1977-78 Glamorgan County Silver Ball Trophy - Winners
- 2008-09 Glamorgan County Silver Ball Trophy - Semi-finalists
- 2008-09 WRU Division Five South Central - Champions
- 2018-19 WRU Division 3 West Central A - Promoted

== Notable former players ==
- (Wales) Jack Bassett 15 caps
- (Wales) Howell Davies 4 caps
- (Wales) John Richardson 2 caps, coached Pyle
