= Dai Morris =

Wales international rugby union footballer

- Born: William David Morris; 11 November 1941 (age 85) Rhigos, Rhondda Cynon Taf, Wales
- School: Gadlys Secondary Modern

Rugby union career
- Position: flanker
Amateur team(s)
Years	Team	Apps	(Points)
- Glynneath RFC
–	Rhigos RFC		
–	Penarth RFC		
–	Neath RFC		
–	Ebbw Vale RFC		
–	Hirwaun RFC		
International career
Years	Team	Apps	(Points)
1967–1974	Wales	34	(19)

William David "Dai" Morris MBE (born 11 November 1941 in Rhigos, Cynon Valley) is a Welsh former rugby union footballer, who won 34 caps for Wales in the years between 1967 and 1974, scoring six tries. His usual position was as a back-row forward, either at blind-side flanker or at Number 8, positions he occupied for both Wales and his club sides, Neath RFC and Rhigos RFC.

During his time in the Wales team, Morris won three Five Nations Championships (one shared with France), including two Triple Crowns and one Grand Slam.

In 2002, Morris was voted into an all-time greatest Welsh XV at the blindside flanker position.

A biography, written by Morris and journalist and broadcaster Martyn Huw Williams, was published in 2012.
