= Archbishop McGrath Catholic High School =

School in Bridgend, UK

Coordinates: 51.5078°N 3.5586°W

- Brackla, Bridgend; United Kingdom

Information
- Type: Secondary school

Archbishop McGrath Catholic High School is a secondary school located in Brackla, Bridgend.

== Original school ==
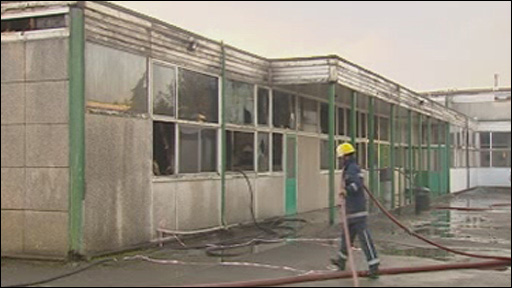
The Old School Building after the School Fire

Originally built in the 1960s, Archbishop McGrath was located next to Ynysawdre Comprehensive School, Ynysawdre, Bridgend. In 2009, arsonists burnt down the Technology Department and heavily damaged the sports hall. The local council and the Archdiocese of Cardiff paid to have replacement portable buildings installed, which allowed teaching to continue whilst the Technology Department was torn down and the sports hall repaired. As the fire happened in autumn outside of school time, nobody was injured and examinations were not disturbed. Other minor structural problems were prevalent throughout the school, and it was demolished outright by early 2012.

== New school ==
Following the fire, plans were made to build a new school designed by HLM architects at a site in Brackla, Bridgend just past the 'triangle' shopping area. The contract went to the Leadbitter Group Ltd and construction began in early 2010. Construction was completed by October 2011 but the school was in use by September that year. The new school has won multiple architecture awards and won the Gold Medal for Architecture at the National Eisteddfod of Wales of 2012.

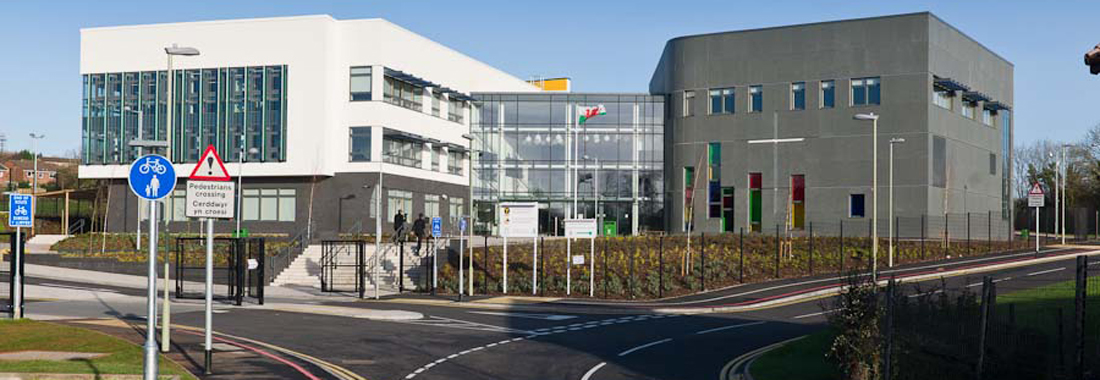
The New School Building
