= Keith Bradshaw (rugby union) =

Wales international rugby union footballer

- Born: Keith Bradshaw; 7 April 1939 Cefn Cribwr, Wales
- Died: 2 February 2014 (aged 74)
- School: Ogmore Grammar
- Occupation: Schoolmaster

Rugby union career
- Position: Centre
Amateur team(s)
Years	Team	Apps	(Points)
- Cefn Cribwr RFC
–	Tondu RFC		
–	Bridgend RFC		
–	Barbarian F.C.		
International career
Years	Team	Apps	(Points)
1964–1966	Wales	9	(36)

Keith Bradshaw (7 April 1939 – 2 February 2014) was a Wales international rugby union player. He was capped nine times for Wales, and at club level played for Bridgend.

== Rugby career ==
Bradshaw first played rugby at club level for his home town team of Cefn Cribwr RFC. He later played for Tondu before switching to first-class team Bridgend. Bradshaw was first selected to represent Wales in the opening encounter of the 1964 Five Nations Championship, played against England at Twickenham. Bradshaw was paired at centre with Llanelli's Ken Jones, in a game that ended in a 6-6 draw.

Bradshaw retained his place for the rest of the 1964 tournament, and in his second game, a home fixture with Scotland, he scored his first international points for Wales with a try, a conversion and a penalty goal, in a convincing win. He was on the score sheet for the next match, when away against Ireland he successfully converted all three Welsh tries. Wales won 15-6. The last game of the 1964 Championship was a home match against France, but their form shown against the Home Nations left the team, and they struggled to keep up with a poor French team. At one point, France were eight points in front, and only some fine place-kicking from Bradshaw (with a conversion and two penalties) allowed the team to snatch a draw.

In May 1964, Bradshaw was chosen as part of the Welsh squad to tour Africa, the first team from Wales to play outside Europe. Bradshaw was given kicking duties, scoring four conversions and a penalty against East Africa and then, in the only Test of the tour, he scored the only Welsh points, with a single penalty, in a humiliating 24-3 loss against South Africa.

In the 1964/65 season Bradshaw was made captain of the senior Bridgend team. Bradshaw failed to play for Wales in the 1965 Championship, but the next year he played in all four games of the 1966 tournament. Wales beat England and Scotland, Bradshaw scoring a conversion in the Scottish encounter. Despite scoring a penalty goal for Wales in the Ireland game, the Welsh team were beaten 6-9, leaving the team needing a win over France to secure the Championship title. The France encounter was an exciting contest filled with incident. Bradshaw kicked two penalties to bring Wales back into the game after France built up an eight-point lead in the first 12 minutes; then Stuart Watkins intercepted a French pass in their own 25, completing a 70-yard run to score the winning try. Wales took the match and the Championship. This was Bradshaw's final international game.

== Personal history ==
Bradshaw was born in Cefn Cribwr in 1939, and was educated at Ogmore Grammar School. He was employed as a draughtsman for the National Coal Board, before becoming a schoolmaster. His son, Chris, also played rugby, for Bridgend and Swansea and was named the 'Bill Everson Man of the Tournament' in the 1991 Snelling Sevens competition.

On 2 February 2014, he died at the age of 74 after a long illness.

== Bibliography ==
- Griffiths, John (1987). The Phoenix Book of International Rugby Records. London: Phoenix House. ISBN 0-460-07003-7.
- Jenkins, John M.; et al. (1991). Who's Who of Welsh International Rugby Players. Wrexham: Bridge Books. ISBN 1-872424-10-4.
