= Rhigos =

Coordinates: 51°44′N 3°34′W

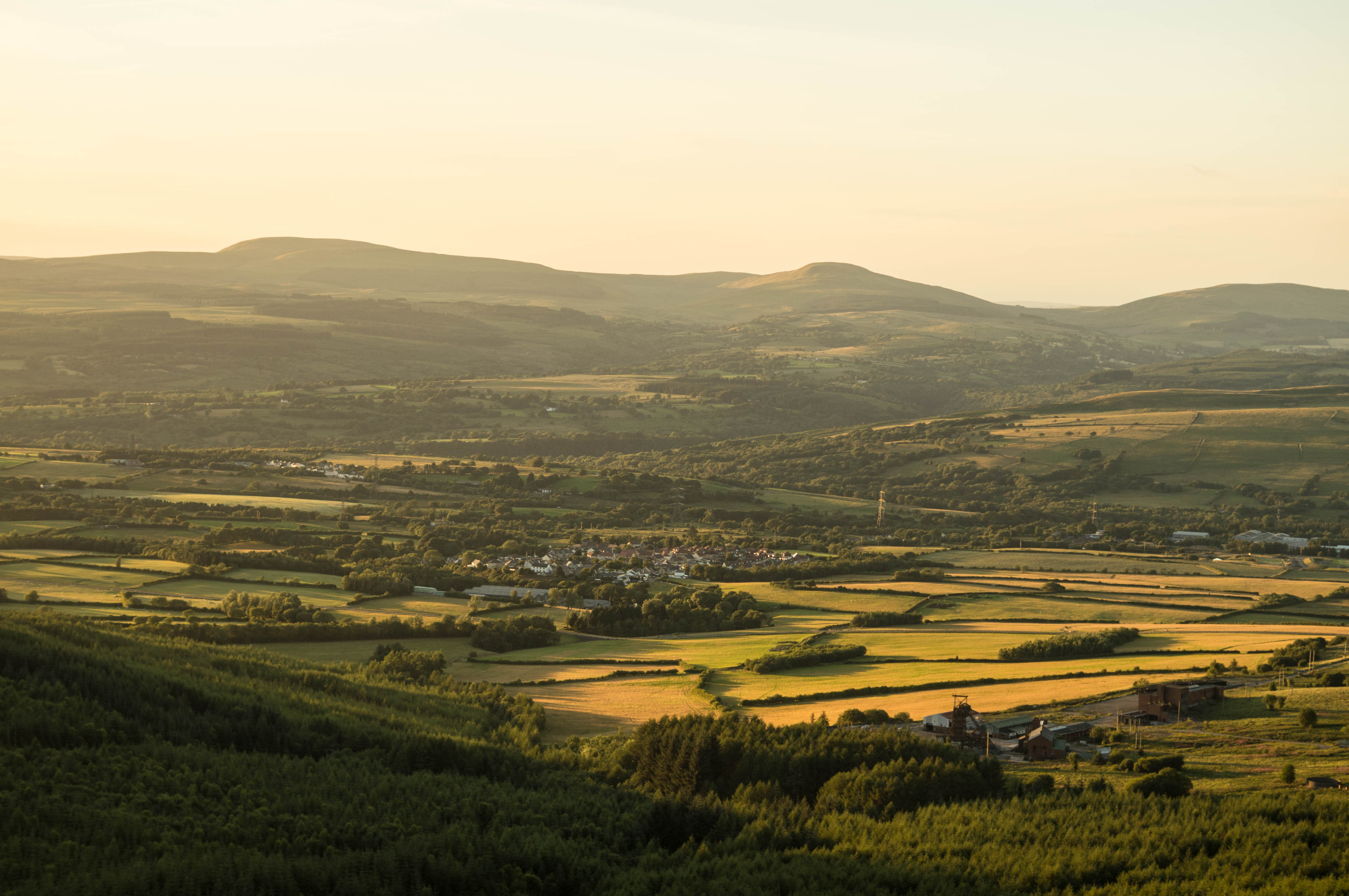
- Rhigos village and Tower Colliery as viewed from the Rhigos Mountain viewpoint

- Location within Rhondda Cynon Taf
- Principal area: Rhondda Cynon Taf
- Preserved county: Mid Glamorgan
- Country: Wales
- Sovereign state: United Kingdom
- Post town: ABERDARE
- Postcode district: CF44
- Police: South Wales
- Fire: South Wales
- Ambulance: Welsh
- UK Parliament: Merthyr Tydfil and Aberdare
- Senedd Cymru – Welsh Parliament: Cynon Valley
- List of places UK Wales Rhondda Cynon Taf Community map: Map of the community

Rhigos (ˈrɪk.ɔs) is a village and community in Rhondda Cynon Taf, Wales. The village is located on the saddle of higher ground between the Vale of Neath and the Cynon Valley. It was part of Neath Rural District, in the county of Glamorgan, until 1974. The village then came under the jurisdiction of Cynon Valley Borough, which subsequently became Rhondda Cynon Taf in 1996. It lies just off the Aberdare road that was the main link between Aberdare and Glynneath, before the A465 road was extended in the 1960s. The hamlets of Cefn Rhigos and Cwm-Hwnt lie to the west of the main village.

The population of the community in the 2011 census was 894. The postal town is Aberdare, although it is some 7 miles (11 km) from Aberdare town centre, and 2 miles (3.2 km) from Glynneath. It was noted as a township in the parish of Ystradyfodwg in several historical references and people moved to this rural area to work in local industries. Today the village is a quiet place to live with views of the Brecon Beacons National Park to the north and is within walking distance of Waterfall Country.

== Etymology ==
The spelling of the name Rhigos is the result of the standardisation of the local dialect form of Rucos or Ricos (same pronunciation).

A rule-of-thumb for writing Welsh place names is that they should be spelt according to the standard language and not the local dialect form (though there are many instances of names showing local traits). An initial 'c' in a final syllable in the Gwent - Gwenhwyseg dialect is often a devoiced form of 'g', and such is the case here. An initial 'r' is generally a deaspirated 'rh' in the dialect, but this is not the case here. Since in South Wales 'u' and 'i' no longer represent different vowel sounds (though in North Wales these spellings DO show different vowels) in spelling 'i' might be used instead of the historically correct spelling with 'u'.

In this way 'Rhigos' has come about, though in fact it is, from its earlier spellings, quite evidently from 'grugos' (small clumps of heather - 'grug' is heather and '-os' is a diminutive suffix found in place names after words denoting vegetation, and in the modern language it is seen in 'plantos' = little children). The 'correct' form of the name is 'Y Rugos', a name found in other parts of Wales (also as Y Grugos).

== Geography and natural history ==
"The south Wales Valleys support a treasure trove of biodiversity. Like all good treasure troves it had been lost and long forgotten and has only now been re-found, and like some giant archaeological dig, one discovery has led to another; one find has spurred on the finding of the next."

Rhigos lies at the apex of the Cynon Valley and the Vale of Neath. Craig y Llyn, the mountain summit above it, is the highest peak in the traditional county of Glamorgan. A glacial cirque excavated into the Pennant Sandstone scarp of Craig y Llyn holds the glacial lake of Llyn Fawr. The glaciers sculpted and over-deepened the valleys into characteristic U-shaped profiles. All the deposits of the Welsh ice were locally derived.

Certain parts of the local landscape surrounding Rhigos have been designated as Sites of Special Scientific Interest including the wooded gorges of Waterfall Country, Cwm Cadlan and nearby Blaencynon SAC. The Joint Nature Conservation Committee which advises the government and devolved administrations on UK-wide and international nature conservation, states that the damp grassland and heath of the Blaencynon site has been noted as an area that supports the marsh fritillary butterfly. This butterfly is threatened not only in the UK, but across Europe. which makes this area of importance in an international conservation effort.

The Rhigos Mountain since Mid-August 2022 has been closed until further notice, due to a significant mountain fire, which caused the metal wiring that secures the boulders down, to melt away, posing a significant threat to the A4061 Rhigos Road, which plays a big part in connecting communities such as Treherbert & Hirwaun. Specialist access rope contractors are currently on site investigating the mountainside, and a date for reopening the road has not, and will not be announced for some time as of yet.

== History ==
An important archaeological find was made at Llyn Fawr between 1909 and 1913 which was called 'The Llyn Fawr Hoard'. According to the National Museum of Wales, the Llyn Fawr hoard is extremely important because it illustrates the cross over between the Bronze and Iron Ages. It is unusual because of the mixed styles of objects that suggest a wide range of origins. Indeed, on the British scale the name Llyn Fawr is given to the period of time dating from 750-600BC. These precious and unique items can be found in the National Museum and Galleries of Wales.

The first raising of the red flag took place on nearby Hirwaun Common which subsequently led to the Merthyr Uprising in 1831.

== Industrial history ==
Originally farmland until the late 1700s, the village developed in the Industrial Revolution through the mineral industry, extracting coal, iron ore and limestone. What is believed to be the first coke fired furnace was built on nearby land by John Mayberry of Brecon in 1757. It came into the possession of the Crawshay family in 1819, which provided much employment until the early 1830s. Francis Crawshay famously built a folly on nearby land and was apparently the only member of the family to speak Welsh. The site was then taken over by the Gloucester Railway Carriage and Wagon Company which ran until the 1930s.

British Rhondda Colliery, later called "The Pandy" and finally Rhigos Colliery was opened during the 1920s. This was a drift mine, and it closed in 1965. Coal was extracted from land near Rhigos in 1864 from a drift mine called Tower Graig. This mine is noted to have been discontinued, but there are records that 420 men were employed by The Marquess of Bute to extract coal from Tower Colliery around the 1890s. The Tower Colliery and was famously the subject of a worker's buy-out closed in 2008 and its closure saw the last of the deep mines in Wales come to an end. However, Tyrone O'Sullivan who was part of the worker buy out, spoke about the possibility of the land being regenerated in the future. Indeed, in 2019 RCT Council announced that planning had been unanimously granted for Zipline Cymru to construct of a new line at the Tower site which will be the focus for the development of tourism in the area.

=== Hirwaun Industrial Estate ===
During the Second World War, those not within the colliery industry, and hence in reserved employment, could find similar work at ROF Hirwaun, which was actually sited within Rhigos parish where the present day Industrial Estate is located. Developed by Royal Ordnance Factory and the Ministry of War from 1942 as an offshoot of ROF Newport, it was an engineering ROF producing .303 cartridge cases for Lee–Enfield rifles, and 9mm cartridge cases, which were then shipped to be filled at a Filling ROF. Having built three new roads and associated bungalows to house the workers, all raw materials were shipped in via the former Vale of Neath Railway by the Great Western Railway, using the sidings of the former Tir Herbert brickworks. Day-workers would alight at Rhigos railway station, beyond which were built additional sidings to house the railway carriages that were shipping workers to the site from all over the South Wales valleys. The site of the ROF was discovered by the German military, who ordered a single air raid by the Luftwaffe in 1943.

At the end of the war, the site was abandoned, and the factory was only demolished in the late 1960s. A range of other businesses then took over the Industrial Estate and further details about these can be found in the W.W Price Collection at Aberdare Library.

== Sport and leisure ==
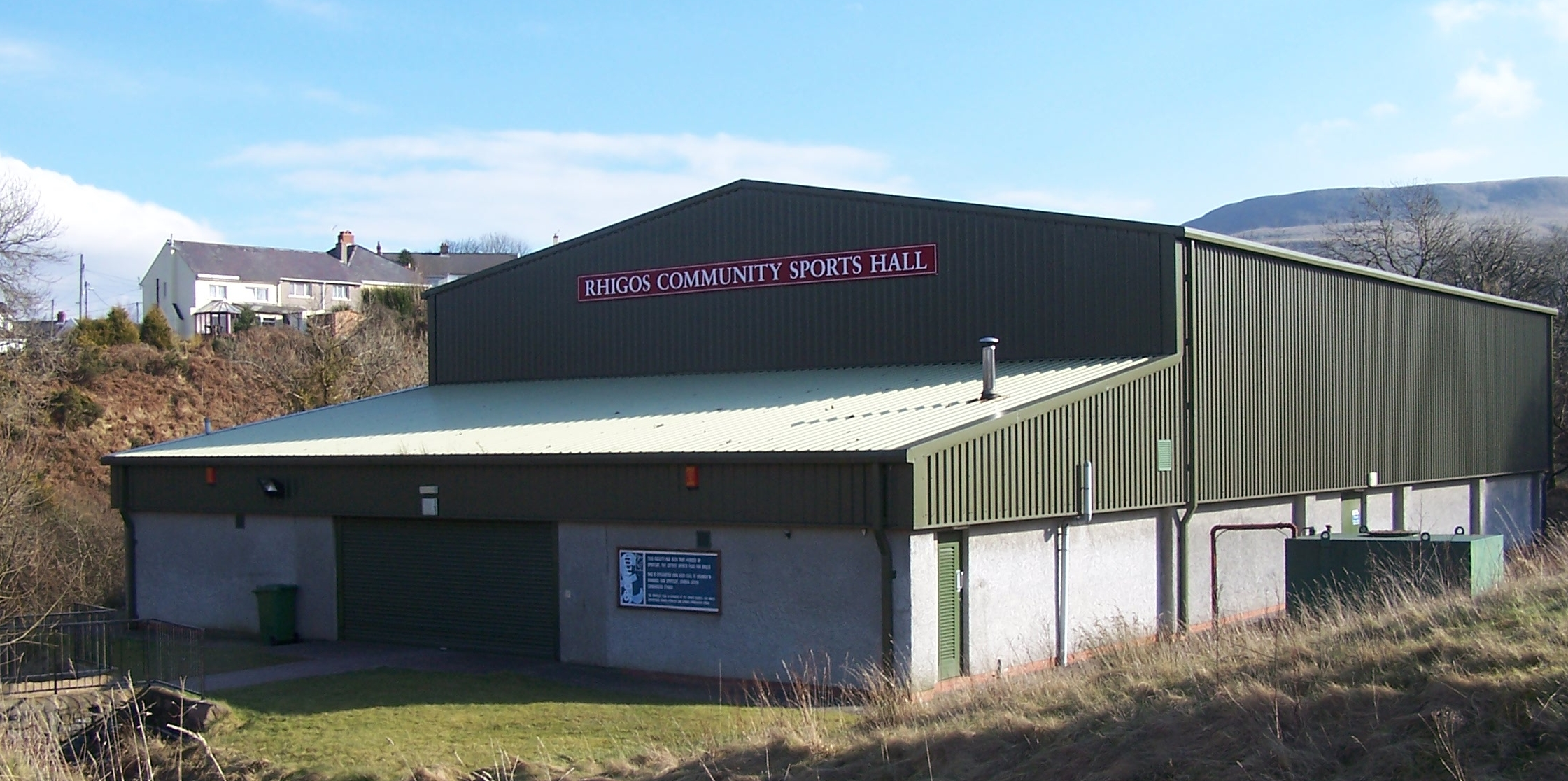
Rhigos Community Sports Hall

One of the village's social hubs is the Rhigos RFC club house. The rugby union team play in Division Three, West Central of the Welsh Rugby pyramid. Rhigos Sports Hall is a volunteer-run facility, and is located adjacent to the rugby club. It provides a range of indoor sporting facilities to Rhigos and the surrounding areas. The Rhigos WCKA Kickboxing Club meet in the hall each week and is part of the Welsh Contact Karate Association. Members of the club were part of the Wales team who attended the World Kickboxing Championships 2018 in Greece.

The Vale of Neath Gliding Club operates from a grass airfield for gliding close to the village. where tuition can be given under the guidance of British Gliding Association qualified instructors. The Rhigos mountain is also a popular spot for paragliders due to the excellent thermal conditions and views. Cyclists are also often found in and around Rhigos. The route up the mountain forms part of competitions and meets for clubs from all over the UK, such as the Junior Tour of Wales and is considered to be a scenic but particularly challenging climb. It has been quoted as being one of the most beautiful and challenging ascents in the whole of Wales.

== Transport ==
In 1850 the Vale of Neath Railway opened its line between Neath and Aberdare via Hirwaun, completing its mainline to Merthyr Tydfil from Hirwaun in 1853. Rhigos Halt consisted of two platforms and was sited at the north end of the 520 yard long Pencaedrain Tunnel. Brown's engineering sidings were additionally built to house permanent way vehicles that were maintaining the railway tracks. The climb from Glynneath to Rhigos involved the steep Glynneath embankment, which required all north-bound trains to take on a banker locomotive at Glynneath station, which was released at Rhigos.

After the railway was closed under the Beeching Axe, the council took the opportunity to provide a better road link between Hirwaun and Glynneath, and so bypassed the old Aberdare road by building an extension to A465 road which used most of the trackbed of the abandoned railway. The road has now been identified by the government as being in need of improvement due to restricted traffic flow and poor visibility. The current plans in place are stated by the government to be completed by 2024.

'The Parrish Road' was another access to the village which was closed when Celtic Energy opened a controversial opencast mine between Rhigos and Cwmgwrach in 1997. The promise was made to reinstate the road after the mine closed, and talks have been held between residents, Celtic Energy and Neath Port Talbot County Council during 2020.

== Present day ==
Rhigos Primary School, originally built in the Victorian style in 1876 and located on Heol y Graig, closed on 2024. The majority of pupils from the school subsequently attended Aberdare Community School or St John the Baptist School, Aberdare. Welsh medium education is available for pupils at Ysgol Gynradd Penderyn situated in the nearby village of Pontpren, Penderyn and then at secondary level at Ysgol Gyfun Rhydywaun. The nearest Catholic primary school is St Margaret's Primary. Prior to the building of Rhigos Primary School, classes were held in rooms provided by R Crawshay Esq, first mentioned in the journals of William Roberts (Nefydd) in 1856. He states how the school was funded by the colliers and miners of Rhigos, who each contributed 1d of each pound of their wages to support a master, whose salary was £40.

There is a Voluntary Society in Rhigos who organise a carnival for the village in the summer. They also take local children to see the pantomime in Aberdare Coliseum at Christmas and ensure that 'Santa' visits each street handing out goodies for little ones. The village Community Centre is located on Heol Esgyn. It received funding for renovations in 2013. The Rhigos Community Council meets there each month, and it is also used by senior citizens groups, youth clubs and for council surgeries.

Rhigos is represented in RCT council by Cllr Graham Thomas and in The Senedd by Vicki Howells AS.

The New Inn is situated on Smiths Avenue. The Plough pub at Cwm-Hwnt is no longer in use.

== Notable people ==
Rhigos has produced some international rugby players, most notably Dai Morris, who played for Rhigos RFC and Neath RFC. He won 34 caps for Wales as a flanker during the "Second Golden Era" of Welsh rugby in the 1970s, and dual rugby union/rugby league international Glyn Shaw.
