= Rhigos RFC =

(Wales) Rhigos RFC
- Full name: Rhigos Rugby Football Club
- Nickname: The Axemen
- Founded: 1930
- Location: Rhigos, Wales
- Ground: Cwm Hwnt Rhigos
- President: Twmos Lewis
- Coach: Emori Katalau / Jason Morris
- League: WRU Division 4 West Central

Official website
- www.rhigosrugby.co.uk

Rhigos Rugby Football Club is a Welsh rugby union club based in Rhigos, Aberdare, South Wales.

== History/Current ==
Rhigos RFC were formed by the local cricket team that decided they needed a winter sport to allow them to continue playing when the cricket season ended. A vote was made between members on whether to choose rugby or football, and rugby won by a single vote and the club was created. During the 1937/38 season the club won the Pontypridd and District cup beating Rhydyfelin RFC 3–0. Originally playing on the Gwrangon Field, they moved temporarily to Mount Road, before changing grounds again to Newth's Field.

Rhigos Rfc currently play in Division 5 West Central of the WRU Admiral Men's National Leagues

Rhigos have got to the quarterfinals of the wru division 5 cup in the last 2 years but have lost in both occasions.

== Club honours ==
1937/38 Pontypridd and District Cup - champions

== Notable past players ==
- (Wales) Dai Edwards
- (Wales) Dai Morris
