= Bridgend Designer Outlet =

Coordinates: 51.53249°N 3.57759°W

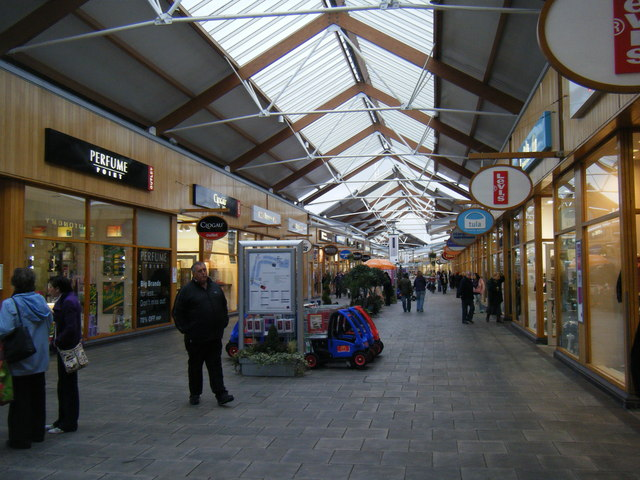

The Bridgend Designer Outlet, also known as McArthurGlen Designer Outlet (and known locally as "The Pines"), is a commercial retail park and outlet store development in Bridgend, Wales, United Kingdom. It is owned and operated by McArthurGlen Group.

== History ==
The development is situated on Junction 36 of the M4 motorway between Cardiff and Swansea. It first opened in 1998. It consists of around ninety different stores which offer discounts off brand and designer labels. An array of goods are available including clothes, toys, books and electrical products.

A food court was opened in 2011, and a play area added in 2015. In 2014 the Outlet underwent a makeover and five new stores opened in 2015, including Ernest Jones, Calvin Klein, Henri Lloyd, Le Creuset and Snow + Rock. The outlet's facelift cost £2.5million. A total refurbishment of the food court is due to start soon.

== Accessibility ==
The Designer Outlet is located near the villages of Sarn, Litchard and Pen-y-fai and the town of Bridgend. Adjacent to the development are a Sainsbury's supermarket, a Miller and Carters restaurant, a Premier Inn hotel, a Joules clothing store and a KFC restaurant which was previously located in the food court until 2012.

It is also served by a number of bus routes to destinations both north and south of the village to and from the town of Bridgend and the Llynfi, Garw and Ogmore Valleys and has a bus stop which is served by National Express and TrawsCambria coaches between Swansea and Cardiff.
