= Bridgend Sports RFC =

Clubhouse The Riverside Tavern Bridgend

Bridgend Sports Rugby Football Club is a Welsh rugby union team based in Bridgend, South Wales. Formed in 1938 by Victor Blick, the team survived the cessation of club rugby in Wales between 1939 and 1945, during the Second World War. There have been at least two other clubs in Bridgend throughout the club's history providing local competition. The club is a member of the Welsh Rugby Union and presently plays in WRU Division 2 West Central.

The club also runs touch rugby, and walking rugby teams.

== History ==
=== The Beginning & Founder Victor Blick ===
Victor Blick came to Bridgend in the late 1920s as a postman from Neath and formed the Bridgend District Time Limit Cricket League in 1936 held at the Brewery Field.

In 1938, Blick and his friends Trevor Davies and Roy Davies of Newcastle Hill, decided to create another rugby team in the town. There was already Bridgend RFC and Bridgend Athletic (a different club to the present club). The laws at this time made it difficult to play open rugby, but Victor Blick’s insisted on playing an open game.

With the outbreak of World War 2 most rugby ceased, but Victor kept the Club alive by organising occasional fixtures against RAF St Athan and the Royal Ordnance Factory sides. With the cessation of the hostilities it was not too difficult for the Club to reform. In 1946 Victor organised the first tour to Devon where the Sports played Barnstable and Biddeford.

Victor Blick’s founded the Bridgend Sports Club, which had an influence on local teenagers in the late 1930s and early 40s.

The mid 1950s saw a period of Sports Rugby with the only “Invincible” season to date, 1954-1955. Captained by Fred Gronow, who played the most games taking the field for 32 of the 35 matches. The team featured Derek Davies, who secured the record points tally with 90, Dennis Speck scored the most tries with 13, followed by Ron Meadows with 10 tries. Edwin Slade and Peter Wright joined the side and helped secure a record of:- P35 W30 D5 L0.

=== 1958 - 1978 ===
In 1959 the side with Clive Hathaway, Peter Wright and Brian Holl as well as Ashong and Greenslade won a Sevens competition in Scotland.

The Club supplied players to Bridgend on a regular basis and won many Sevens competitions both in Wales, England and even in the USA. With a fixture list built by Jack Braund, the Club chose to honour these fixtures rather than opt into the League system that was offered up by the WRU in the next decade.

=== 1978 - 1998 ===
Following the team's period of play in the late 1970s and early 1980s, Bridgend Sports won three Silver Ball finals consecutively. During this time, the club moved upward within the Welsh rugby hierarchy.

=== 2018 - 2019 / The 80th Anniversary Season ===
In November 2018 the club was registered as a CIO. In the club's 80th Season, The Sports The 1st XV were crowned Champions of WRU West Central 3 A on the last day of the 2018/2019 season in front of just under 1000 supporters at the Bandstand by beating old rivals and league runners up Pyle RFC. The side also reached the semi-final of the WRU Bowl losing a very close game to Oakdale RFC and reached the Final of the District Cup and the Presidents Cup.

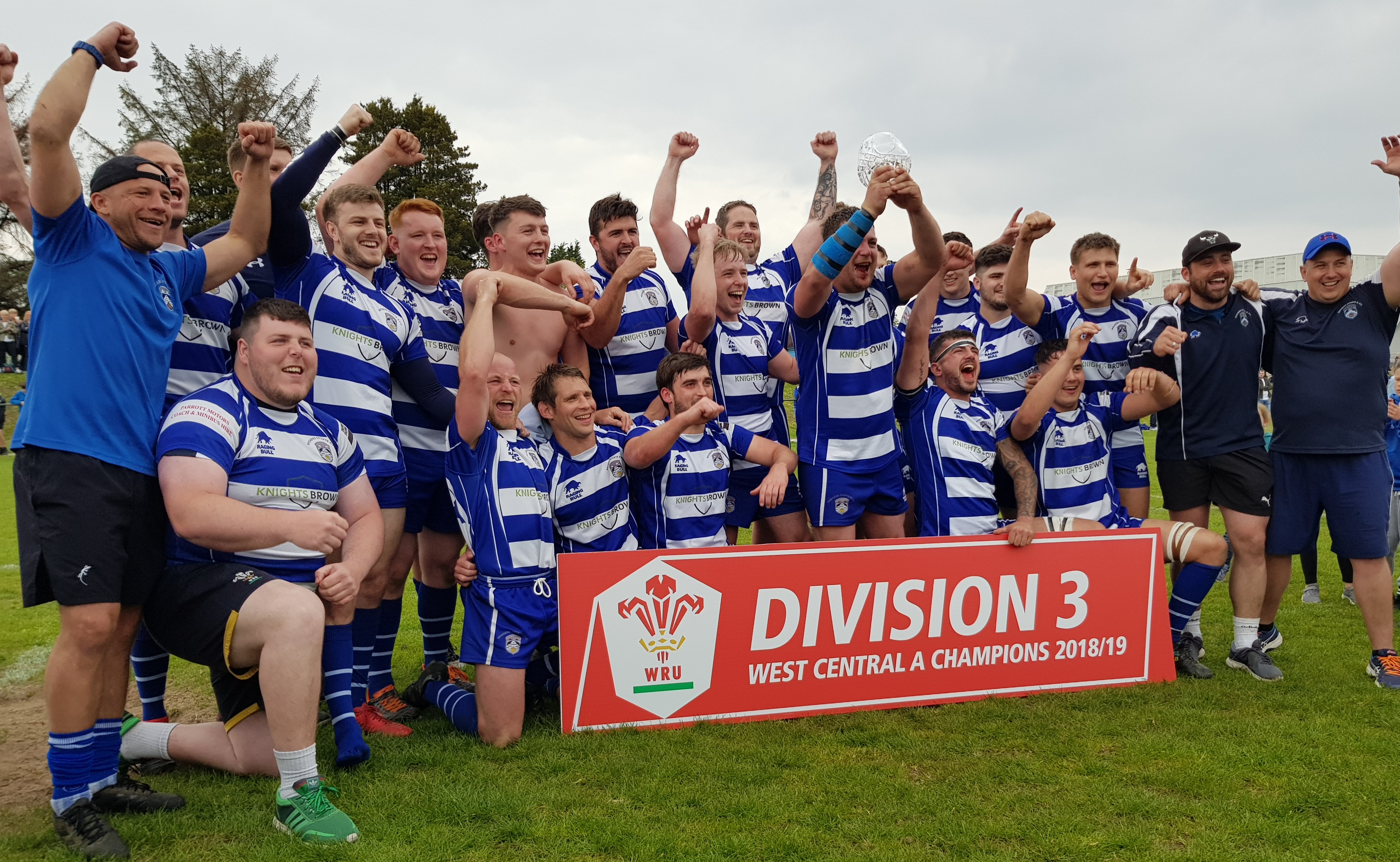
The Sports 1st XV - WRU West Central 3A Champions 2018/2019

The Junior Section of the Club also played their part with the U12's winning the District D GMG Cup and the U15s making the semi-finals of the Ospreys Cup. In the 2018/2019 season, an under 7’s player from 12 years ago, Zac Hemsley, who registered on the first day of the Mini’s season, played for the first team.

== Presidents ==
Current: Marc Jehu

Andrew Murphy

== 1st XV Captain ==
2008 - 2010: Chris Norris

2010 - 2015: Gary Punter

2015 - 2018: Lloyd Wilson

2018 - 2021: Greg Thomas

2021 - Andrew Gill

2022 - Lloyd Wilson

2023 current: Andrew Gill

== Internationals ==
Dewi Lake - Wales - 1st Cap vs Ireland, 5/2/22 / Wales U20 Captain 2019 / Sports 2011 to 2017 / Ospreys 2017 to current
