= Ivor Thomas (rugby union) =

- Born: 30 April 1900 Coity, Wales
- Died: 12 May 1995 (aged 95) Bridgend, Wales

Rugby union career
- Position: Hooker
International career
Years	Team	Apps	(Points)
1924	Wales	1	(0)

Ivor Thomas (30 April 1900 – 12 May 1995) was a Welsh international rugby union player.

Thomas hailed from the Garw Valley town of Pontyrhyl.

A forward, Thomas played in Wales for Bridgend, Bryncethin and Pontycymmer. His only Wales cap however came while playing for Devon club Torquay Athletic. He featured in a 1924 Five Nations match against England at Swansea.

Thomas retired as a player in 1934 and took up refereeing.

== See also ==
- List of Wales national rugby union players
