= Sarn, Bridgend =

Coordinates: 51.540°N 3.584°W

Sarn
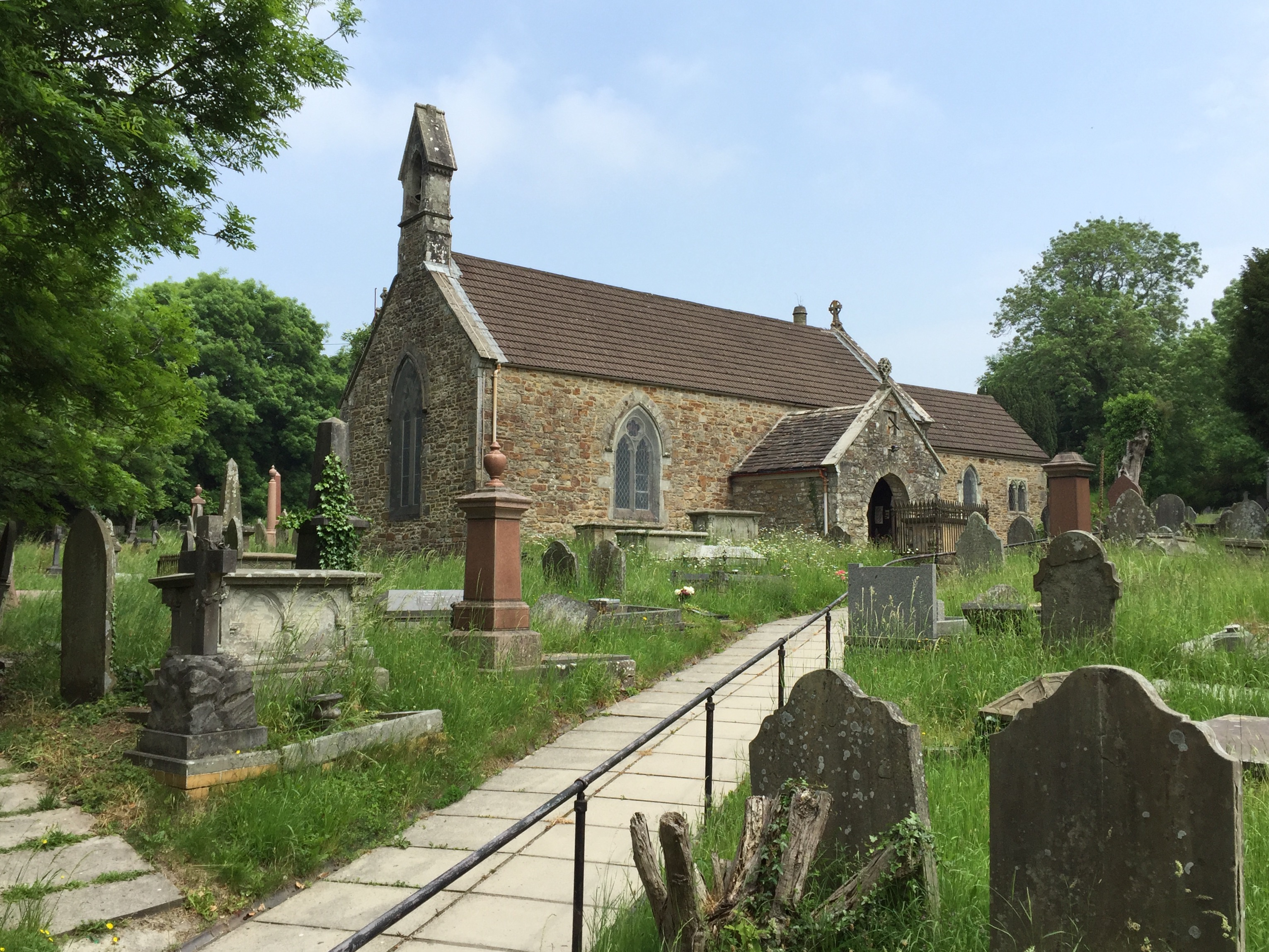
- St. Bride's Church, Llansantffraid, Sarn

- Location within Bridgend
- Population: 2,443 (ward.2011)
- Community: St Bride's Minor
- Principal area: Bridgend
- Preserved county: Mid Glamorgan
- Country: Wales
- Sovereign state: United Kingdom
- Post town: BRIDGEND
- Postcode district: CF32
- Dialling code: 01656
- Police: South Wales
- Fire: South Wales
- Ambulance: Welsh
- UK Parliament: Bridgend
- Senedd Cymru – Welsh Parliament: Ogmore

Sarn is a village (and electoral ward) in Bridgend County Borough, Wales, about three miles (five kilometres) north of Bridgend and which lies just east of the confluence of the Ogmore and Llynfi rivers. It is located to the east of Aberkenfig, south of Brynmenyn, and south-east of Tondu. It is around 15 minutes' walk from the M4 and the McArthurGlen Group Bridgend Designer Outlet.

== Description ==
Sarn is part of the community of St Bride's Minor, being the main shopping centre for the area, including a post office, supermarket and number of independent shops.

Although the Welsh Government classes Sarn as the urban area north of Bridgend which encompasses Aberkenfig, Bryncethin, Brynmenyn, Sarn, Tondu and Ynysawdre and has a total population of approximately 10,000, Sarn itself only has a population of 2500. Bridgend County Borough Council refers to the area North of Bridgend as the Valleys Gateway.

== Education ==
The nearest primary schools are Bryncethin primary school, Brynmenyn Primary school, Tondu Primary school and the nearest comprehensive school is Coleg Cymunedol Y Dderwen, located in neighbouring village of Ynysawdre. The closest Welsh-medium school is Ysgol Gyfun Gymraeg Llangynwyd in Maesteg.

== Transport ==
Sarn is served by Sarn railway station which was opened by British Rail on 28 September 1992. Passenger services were operated by Arriva Trains Wales and subsequently are operated by Transport for Wales as part of the Valley Lines network for local services on the Maesteg Line.

Bus Routes are served by First Cymru which has lines stopping by Sarn to travel to and from Nantymoel, Blaengarw and Bridgend. The Bridgend Designer Outlet has more routes which can take you up Cardiff, Swansea, Maesteg and Porthcawl.

== Governance ==
At the local level Sarn is a community ward of St Bride's Minor Community Council, electing up to six of the thirteen community councillors.

Sarn is governed by Bridgend County Borough Council. From the 2022 local elections, the village has been within "St Bride's Minor and Ynysawdre" ward, electing three county borough councillors.

== Notable residents ==
- Gareth Thomas, rugby player
