= Ynysawdre Comprehensive School =

Coordinates: 51.546667°N 3.586987°W

Ysgol Ynysawdre School

Location
- Heol-Yr-Ysgol; Tondu, Bridgend County Borough, CF32 9LA; Wales

Information
- Motto: BEST (Behaviour, effort, success, trust)
- Established: 1964
- Closed: 20 July 2011
- Local authority: Bridgend County Borough
- Head teacher: Andrew Warren
- Age: 11 to 18
- Website: http://ynysawdrecs.bridgend.gov.uk/

Ynysawdre Comprehensive School was a public secondary school located in Tondu in Bridgend County Borough which catered for ages between 11 and 18.

Beginning in Autumn Term 2011, Ynysawdre Comprehensive officially closed and its former students merged with those of Ogmore School to become Coleg Cymunedol Y Dderwen (translated to The Oak Community College).

== Merger with "Ogmore" 2011 ==
As part of a new multi-million project, the school merged with neighbouring school 'Ogmore Comprehensive School' to become Coleg Cymunedol Y Dderwen which opened in September 2011. Both schools continued to see the number of pupils enrolling every year continue to drop, prompting firstly, the council to consider closing one of the 2 schools. However, in 2010, Bridgend County Borough Council, passed a vote and decided to merge the two schools, coming into effect in September 2011. "Ynysawdre Comprehensive School" officially had its last day of service on 21 July 2011, with the school itself, pupils and staff, past and present, holding an open day on the 19th.

The new school currently operates on a split-site basis during a two-year transitional period, while the new main building will be built upon the Ynysawdre site. The new building is expected to be up and running in September 2013. After that, it remains unclear as to what will happen to the "Ogmore" building, with many rumours pointing towards the land being used for a new housing estate.

In 2014, it was revealed that I.T. teacher, Mcphallen Kuwale, was convicted of dealing illegal substances such as cocaine.

== Uniform ==
Original Ynysawdre Comprehensive School Uniform

Original Uniform
Form Year	Jumper	Dress Shirt
Years 1 to 3 Garw and Middle School	Brown	White or Grey
Years 4 to 6 Upper School	Black	White or Grey

Rugby jersey – Bright red with white collar with two thin central black hoops

School Uniform (later)

Keystage	Jumper	Polo Shirt
Keystage 3 (Years 7–9)	Burgundy	White
Keystage 4 (Years 10–11)	Black	White
Keystage 5 (Sixth Form)	Black	Burgundy
