= Craig y Llyn =

Hill (600m) in south Wales

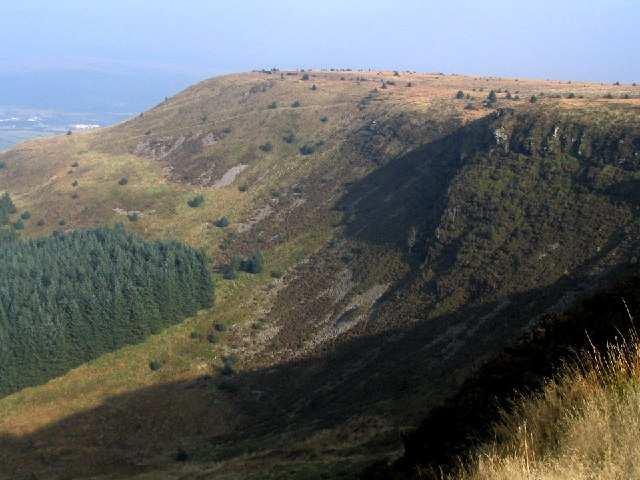
- The west face of Craig y Llyn

Highest point
- Elevation: 600 m (2,000 ft)
- Prominence: 392 m (1,286 ft)
- Listing: Marilyn, council top
- Coordinates: 51°42′57″N 3°35′06″W

Naming
- English translation: cliff of the lake
- Language of name: Welsh
- Pronunciation: Welsh: [krai̯ɡ ə ɬɪn]

Geography
- Location within Wales
- Location: Neath Port Talbot & Rhigos, Rhondda Cynon Taf, Wales
- OS grid: SN906031
- Topo map: OS Landranger 170

Craig y Llyn (Welsh for 'rock/cliff of the lake') is a mountain situated to the south of the village of Rhigos in the Cynon Valley on the south side of the upper Vale of Neath and north of the Rhondda Valleys in South Wales; it is the highest point in the ancient kingdom and, later, county of Glamorgan (Morgannwg), and the southern Welsh coalfield plateau.

== Description ==
The summit of Craig y Llyn lies within the borough of Neath Port Talbot whilst its eastern slopes are within Rhondda Cynon Taf, the boundary running in a north - south direction 200 m (660 ft) to the east of the summit. The name derives from the sandstone cliffs which drop steeply down to the lake on its northern side.

The hill is covered by forestry, except for the steep north and northeast faces, and is crowned with a trig point. Several footpaths cross near the summit of the hill, including the Coed Morgannwg Way. The highest point in Neath Port Talbot, Craig y Llyn, is commonly known as the Rhigos Mountain after the village of Rhigos located on the northern side of the mountain in the Cynon Valley.

The northern slopes and lakes were designated as a Site of Special Interest because they support "...two special habitat features, and is also of special interest for a plant, the water lobelia. The first habitat feature is standing water, supporting aquatic plants typical of lakes with low nutrient content. Some of these plants are not known from anywhere further south in the UK. The second is dry heath, found on the slopes above the lakes."

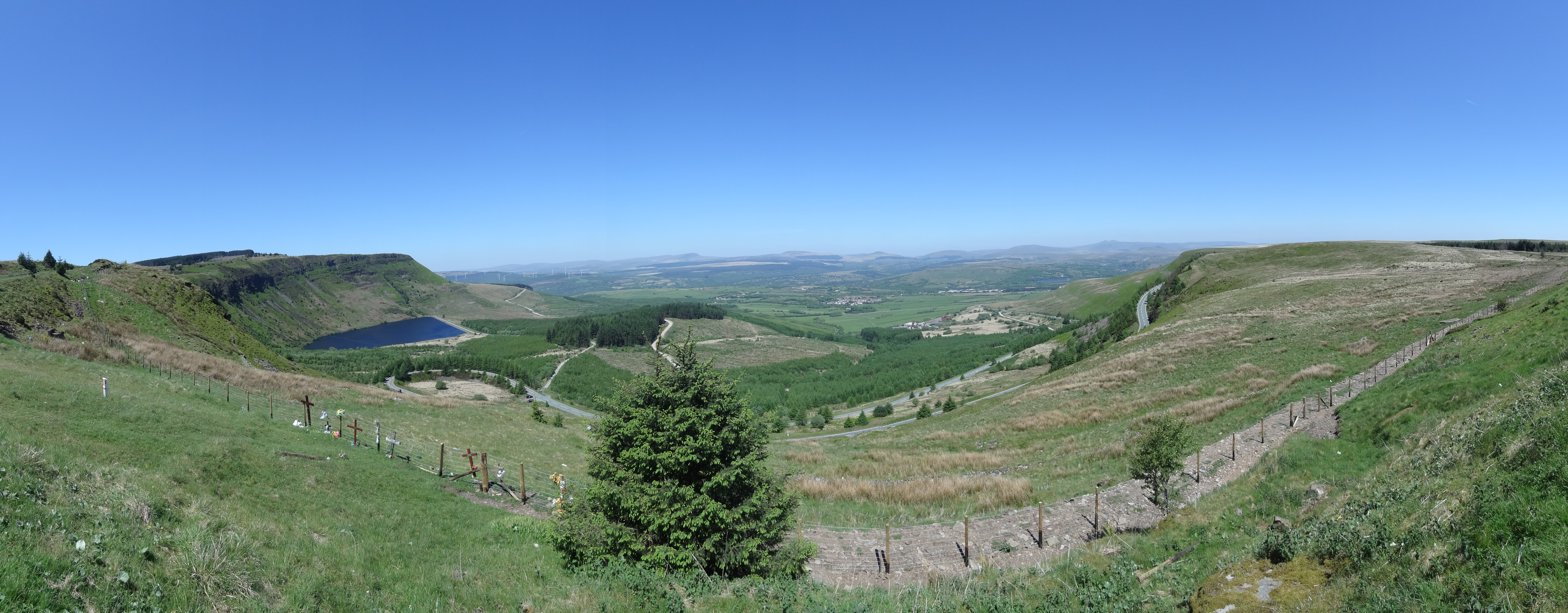
Panoramic view of Rhigos and Llyn Fawr from Craig y Llyn

== Geology ==
The hill is composed of a thick sequence of sandstones and mudstones assigned to the South Wales Coal Measures. The summit plateau is formed from the Pennant Sandstone of the Upper Coal Measures. The two cwms on its northern flanks which shelter Llyn Fach and Llyn Fawr are of glacial origin. In fact, the two lakes are the southernmost glacial tarns to occupy cwms in Great Britain. A landslip mass of rock lies above the western end of the latter lake.

== See also ==
- List of Sites of Special Scientific Interest in Mid & South Glamorgan
