= Bryncethin =

Village in south Wales

Coordinates: 51°33′N 3°34′W

Bryncethin (which means dark hill or dun hill) is a small village and electoral ward in the County Borough of Bridgend, South Wales, located just north of Junction 36 of the M4 Motorway and approximately 3 miles north of the county town of Bridgend. The population of the ward was 1,319 in 2011.

Bryncethin is surrounded by the villages of Aberkenfig, Sarn, Tondu, Ynysawdre, and Abergarw, Brynmenyn the last of which stands at the confluence of the River Garw (Afon Garw) with the larger River Ogmore (Ogmore River).

== History ==
The area was mainly farmland until its ample quantities of high quality clay and workable seams of steam coal led to the construction of a brickworks and the sinking of the Bryncethin Colliery by The Barrow-in Furness Iron and Coal Company. This led to an increase in the population of the village and to the construction of housing for the workforce. Both industries are now long gone and much effort is being made to provide recreational facilities on the site of the former colliery and clay pits.

== Governance ==
At the local level Bryncethin is a community ward to St Bride's Minor Community Council, electing two of the thirteen community councillors.

Bryncethin is also a ward electing a county councillor to Bridgend County Borough Council. Since 1999 the ward was represented by the Labour Party.

== Education ==
There is a large primary school, Bryncethin Primary, and a community college (comprehensive school), Coleg Cymunedol Y Dderwen, which operates on two sites, one of which is in Bryncethin. There is also a small nursery called Cylch Meithryn Bryncethin.

== Sport and leisure ==
Bryncethin is home to Bryncethin RFC, a rugby union club formed in 1890.
