= Rhiwsaeson =

Village in Wales

Coordinates: 51.536104°N 3.341645°W

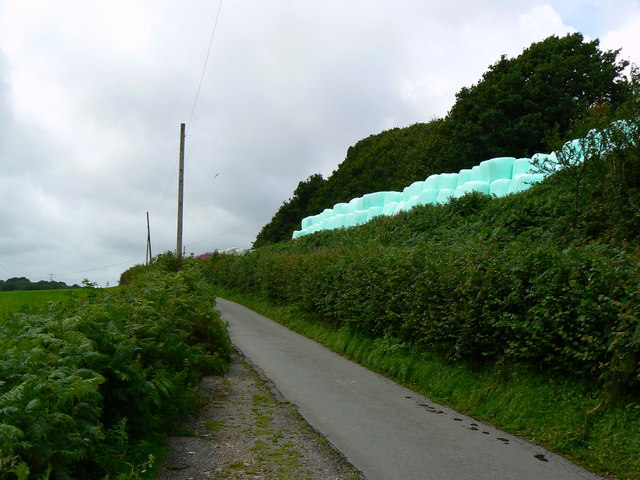

- Location within Rhondda Cynon Taf
- OS grid reference: ST 0704 8276
- Community: Llantrisant
- Principal area: Rhondda Cynon Taf
- Preserved county: Mid Glamorgan
- Country: Wales
- Sovereign state: United Kingdom
- Post town: Pontyclun
- Postcode district: CF72
- Dialling code: 01443
- Police: South Wales
- Fire: South Wales
- Ambulance: Welsh
- UK Parliament: Pontypridd

Rhiwsaeson is a village and district of the principal town and community of Llantrisant with the County Borough of Rhondda Cynon Taf in South Wales. It is located on the south easterly outskirts of the town, along the Afon Clun, south of the A473 and near the village of Groes-faen (Pontyclun) and Creigiau within northwest Cardiff.
