= Afon Clun =

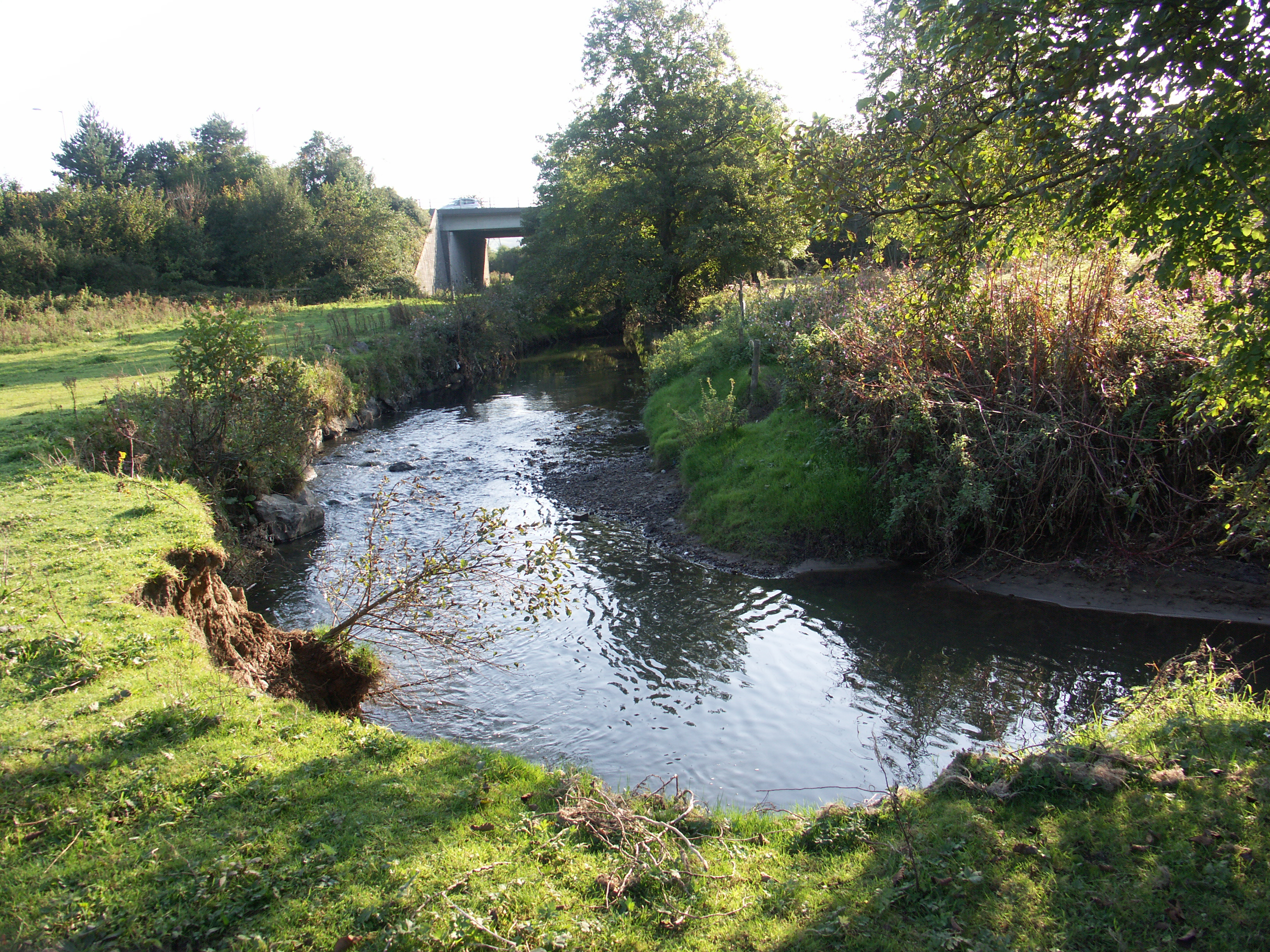
- The Afon Clun near Talbot Green
- Etymology: Welsh: afon = river, clun (obsolete) = meadow

Location
- Country: Wales

Physical characteristics
- Source
  - location: The Garth (Mynydd y Garth), City and County of Cardiff
  - coordinates: 51°32′30″N 3°18′10″W
  - elevation: 260 m (850 ft)
- Mouth
  - location: River Ely (Afon Elái), Pontyclun, Rhondda Cynon Taf
  - coordinates: 51°31′38.35″N 3°23′26″W
  - elevation: 42 m (138 ft)
- Length: 23 km (14 mi)
- Basin size: 32 km^{2} (12 sq mi)
- Discharge
  - location: Pontyclun

Basin features
- Tributaries
  - left: Nant Mwyndy
  - right: Nant Myddlyn

Afon Clun (Welsh for 'River Clun') is a 14-mile (23 km) long tributary of the River Ely (Welsh: Afon Elái), in the counties of Cardiff and Rhondda Cynon Taf, Wales. Its bedrock is predominantly of sandstone. Beginning on the western slope of The Garth (Mynydd y Garth) the river is fast-flowing, in clear shallow water with a hard substrate, flowing to the south of Llantrisant and generally west to its confluence with the River Ely at Pontyclun, falling 715 feet (218 m) over its course.

The river contains species such as stone loach, lamprey, eel, roach, chub and bullhead, and the Afon Clun valley is home to many species, including dragonflies and damselflies, badger, and the marsh fritillary butterfly, as well as the European Protected Species – bats, dormouse, otter and great crested newt. Birds in the area include bullfinch, kingfisher, linnet, reed bunting, skylark, and song thrush.

The valley is at risk of flooding between Cross Inn and Pontyclun and the river is liable to overflow its northern bank along its one-and-a-half-mile (2.4 km) length downstream from the main A4119 (Tonypandy to Cardiff Bay (Bae Caerdydd)) road at Talbot Green (Tonysguboriau) to Pontyclun, providing a wetland wildlife habitat.

Many archeological sites are close to the river, from the Bronze Age tumuli on The Garth and an Iron Age hill fort at Rhiwsaeson, to the more recent industrial archeology of coal mines.

== Course ==
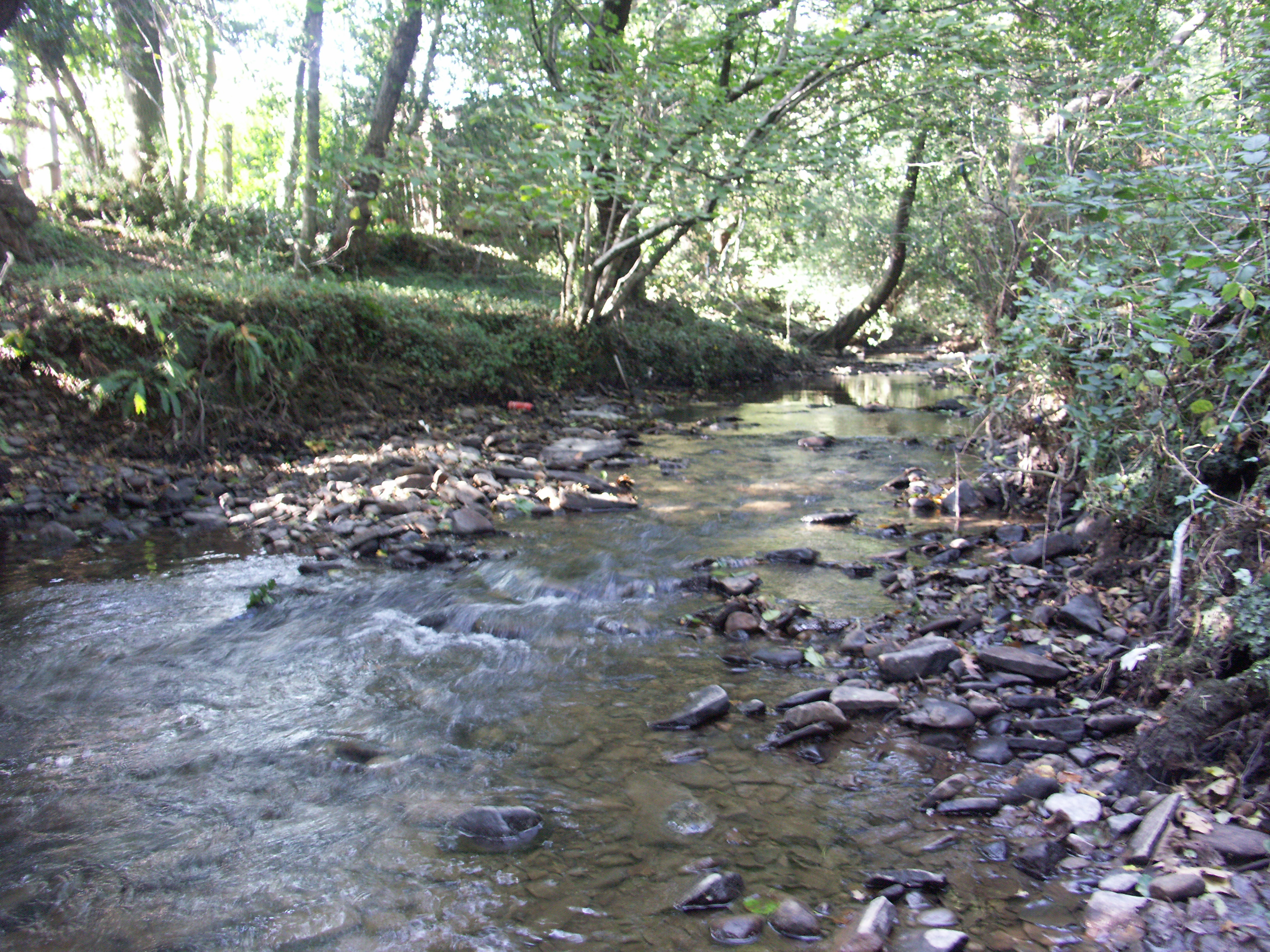
Nant Myddlyn at Llantwit Fardre

The Afon Clun, a major tributary of the River Ely, drains an area of 12 square miles (31 km^{2}) to the north-west of Cardiff in south Wales. The river's source is on the western slope of The Garth, a 1,007 feet (307 m)) mountain of pennant sandstone midway between Cardiff (Caerdydd) and Pontypridd, whose eastern slopes feed the River Taf by Taff's Well (Ffynnon Taf). The Garth stands in the north western corner of the City and County of Cardiff (Dinas a Sir Caerdydd), above the village of Gwaelod y Garth, about seven miles (11 km) north west of Cardiff city centre and about a mile or 1.5 km north of Pentyrch. The lower northern slopes of The Garth form the boundary with Rhondda Cynon Taf, about half a mile (800 m) north of the Clun's source. To the east the land falls away sharply from the summit, dropping more than 650 feet (200 metres) over a distance of 1,200 feet (366 m). The drop is less dramatic on the western slopes, the source of the Clun, but the river still falls to 165 feet (50 m) by the time it crosses the county boundary into Rhondda Cynon Taf at Rhiwsaeson, just under two miles (nearly 3 km) from its source. The Clun is fast-flowing, with clear shallow water and a hard substrate (gravel/cobble/pebble).

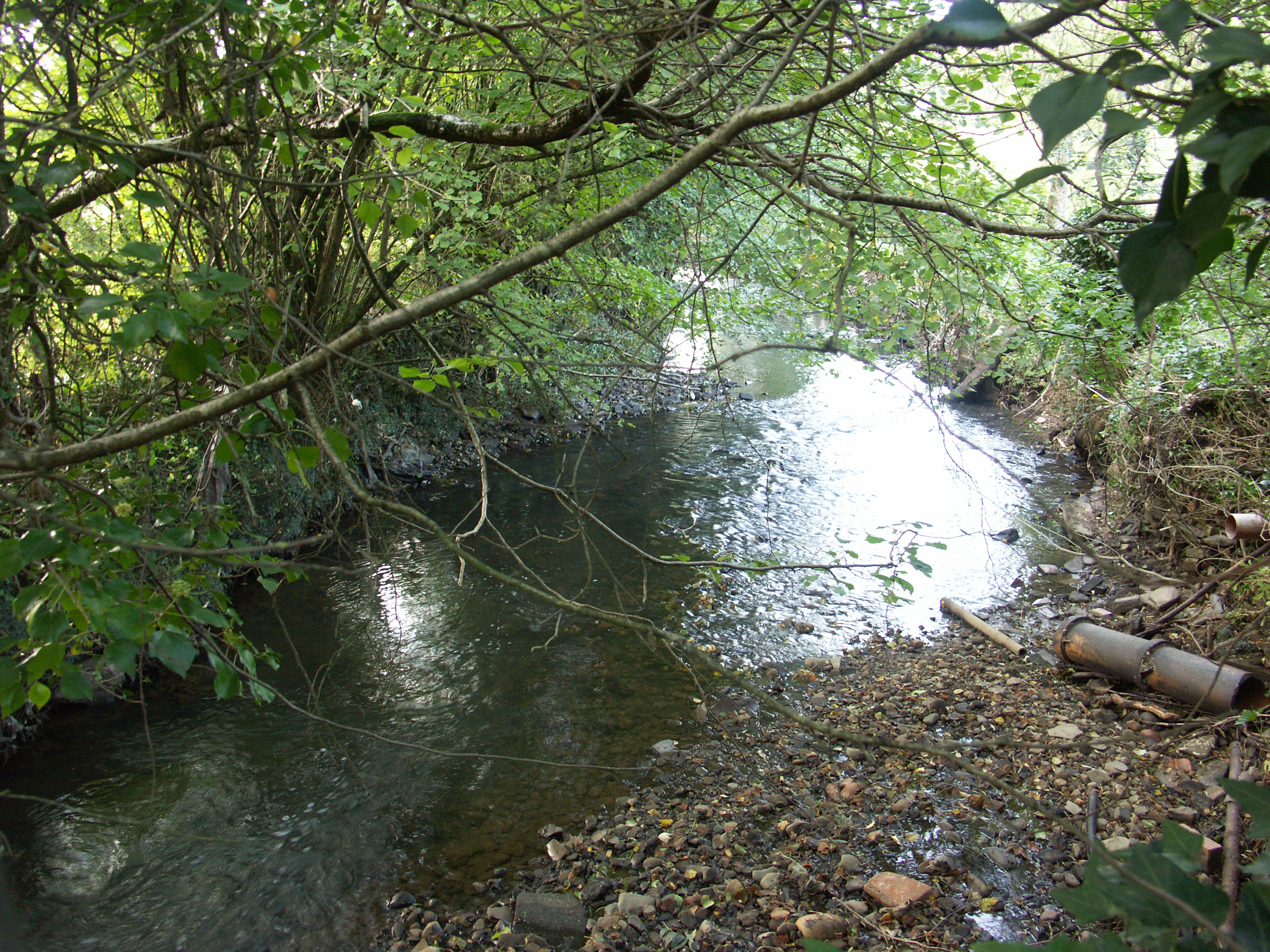
The Afon Clun at Rhiwsaeson

Near the Dŵr Cymru/Welsh Water water treatment plant at Rhiwsaeson the Afon Clun is fed from the north by Nant Myddlyn, which itself is joined from the east by Nant Dowlais. Nant Myddlyn rises in Tynant, Beddau about one and a half miles (2.4 km) to the north of its confluence with the River Clun, between Beddau and Llantwit Fardre (Llanilltud Faerdref), and Nant Dowlais rises in Church Village (Pentre'r Eglwys). Nant Dowlais also has a tributary, which rises on Garth Isaf, two and a quarter miles (3.5 km) from it on the north western slopes of The Garth and about half a mile (800 m) north of the Clun's source.

Leaving Rhiwsaeson, about a mile (1.5 km) east of Cross Inn, the Clun widens to between about eight feet (2.4 metres) and 12 feet (3.7 metres) and slows. Here, where the Clun flows to the south of Cross Inn, as well as along the banks of Nant Dowlais and Nant Myddlyn, evidence of otter activity has been noted. The river flows to the south of the A473 Pontypridd to Bridgend (Penybont ar Ogwr) road (Talbot Green By-Pass), where it is fed from the south by Nant Mwyndy. Nant Mwyndy flows over a bedrock of Carboniferous Limestone, rising in Creigiau and, flowing westwards, immediately north of Groesfaen, passing a small industrial estate at Mwyndy, feeding a lake resulting from Victorian opencast iron mining (see History below) and turning south to flow past Cefn-y-Parc Cemetery, Penygawsi, before reaching its confluence with the Afon Clun.

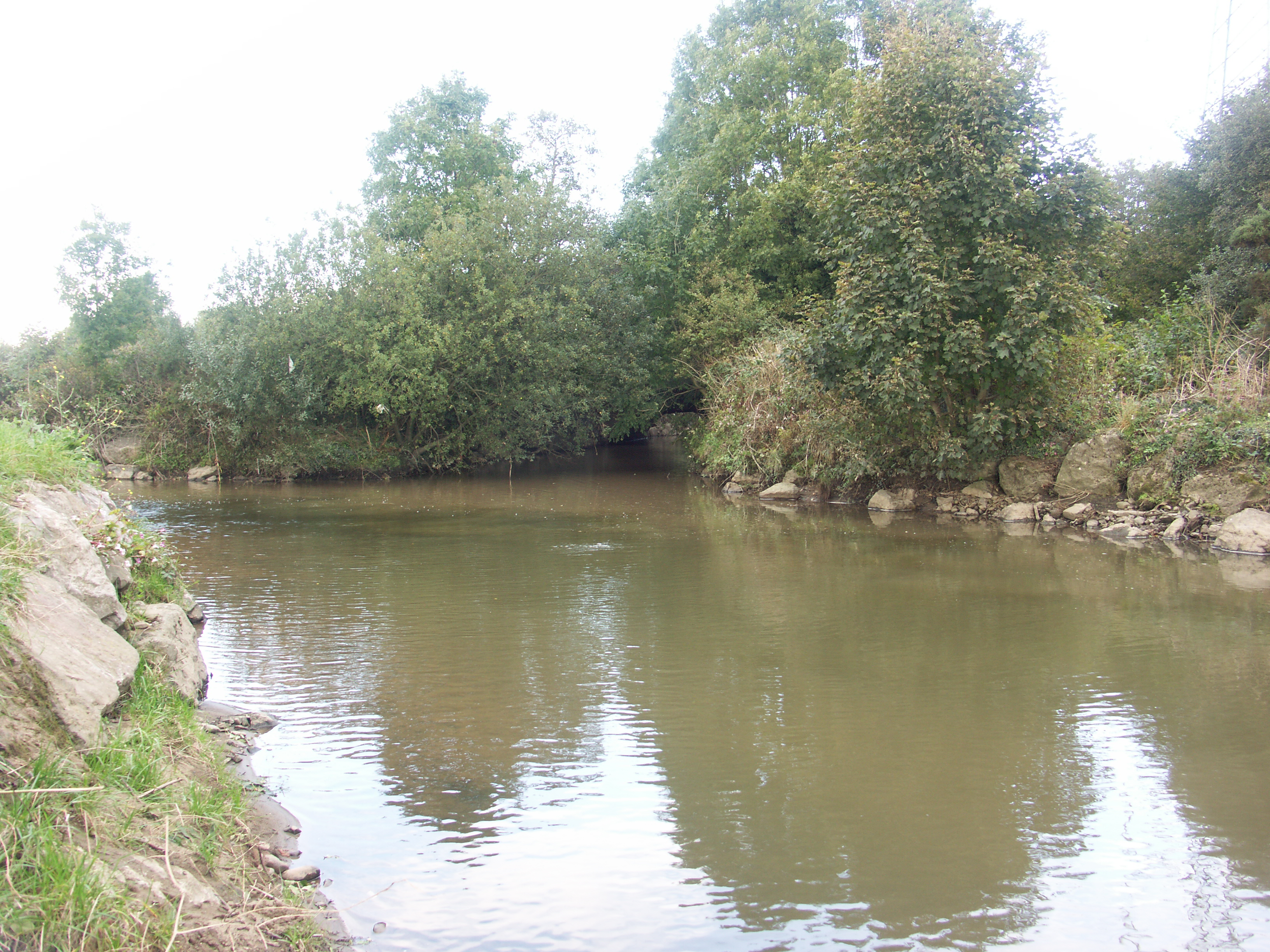
Confluence of Ely (left/north) and Afon Clun (right/east), at Pontyclun

The Clun then flows beneath the main A4119 (Tonypandy to Cardiff Bay) route about 50 metres (164 ft) south of the roundabout by Glamorgan Vale Retail Park, Talbot Green. At this point, the river often overflows onto the meadows to the north, providing a wetland wildlife habitat, although drainage of floodplain grasslands, for industrialisation, housing and associated infrastructure, has affected wildlife by reducing its available area. To the south, the enclosed woodland of Coed-yr-Hendy follows the river's course for its final half-mile (800 m). The woodland's gentle slope, up from the Clun towards Miskin (Meisgyn) and Pontyclun, prevents significant flooding over Afon Clun's southern bank.

After passing Y Pant Comprehensive School and Pontyclun Fire Station, the Clun flows under the bridge built for the Llantrisant to Cowbridge (Y Bont Faen) main road, also known as the A4222, and gives its name to the nearby village, Pontyclun ("Clun bridge"). Immediately past the bridge, 14 miles (23 km) from its source, is the Afon Clun's confluence with the River Ely, which heads south, east to Miskin, almost encircling Pontyclun, then south on its way to Cardiff, where it flows into Cardiff Bay by Penarth Marina, which flows into the Bristol Channel.

== Clun Valley ==
The River Clun and its tributaries pass through the following towns and villages within Rhondda Cynon Taf, before merging with the River Ely at Pontyclun -

- Efail Isaf (Llantwit Fardre)
- Tonteg (Llantwit Fardre)
- Church Village (Llantwit Fardre)
- Llantwit Fardre
- Beddau (Llantrisant)
- Rhiwsaeson (Llantrisant)
- Groes-faen (Pontyclun)
- Cross Inn (Llantrisant)
- Talbot Green
- Tyla Garw (Pontyclun)
- Pontyclun

== Ecology ==
Average annual rainfall in the area is 73.9 inches (1,880 mm).

Bedrock along the river's course is predominantly sandstone.

The Clun's water quality is generally class RE2 or better.

[Note: River Ecosystem Classification (RE) regulations and EU Directives for Bathing Water, Freshwater Fisheries, Dangerous Substances and Urban Waste Water Treatment;

RE1: 'Water of very good quality suitable for all fish species';

RE2: 'Water of good quality suitable for all fish species';

RE3: 'Water of fair quality suitable for high class coarse fish populations';

RE4: 'Water of fair quality suitable for coarse fish populations';

RE5: 'Water of poor quality which is likely to limit coarse fish populations.']

Afon Clun and its tributaries are designated 'salmonid waters and cyprinid waters' by the Department for Environment, Food and Rural Affairs (Defra) under the EC Freshwater Fish Directive (2006/44/EC), which sets physical and chemical water quality objectives to protect fresh water bodies suitable for sustaining fish populations

Rhondda Cynon Taf (RCT) has designated the Afon Clun Valley and Rhiwsaeson Hill as a Site of Important Nature Conservation, which is intended to provide the area with some protection from development. In addition, RCT has designated the undeveloped areas of the southern bank of Afon Clun (from Rhiwsaeson to Coed-yr-Hendy, including Mwyndy) and Efail Isaf, Garth and Nantgarw Western Slopes as Special Landscape Areas (SLAs). (SLAs) are intended to protect the visual qualities of "areas of fine landscape quality", when considering development proposals. Coed-yr-Hendy and Mwyndy consist mainly of "undisturbed" fields and woodlands. The south and west of the Efail Isaf, Garth and Nantgarw Western Slopes area consists of farmland – considered to be a buffer between The Garth and the urban area of Efail Isaf and Church Village. The eastern part is the prominent wooded slopes of the Taf Valley – a backdrop to the Treforest Industrial Estate. SLAs are identified using the Countryside Council for Wales' LANDMAP criteria, considering factors such as prominence, spectacle (dramatic topography and views), unspoilt areas (pre-industrial patterns of land use), remoteness and tranquility, vulnerability and sensitivity to change, and local rarity of landscape.

=== Diversity ===
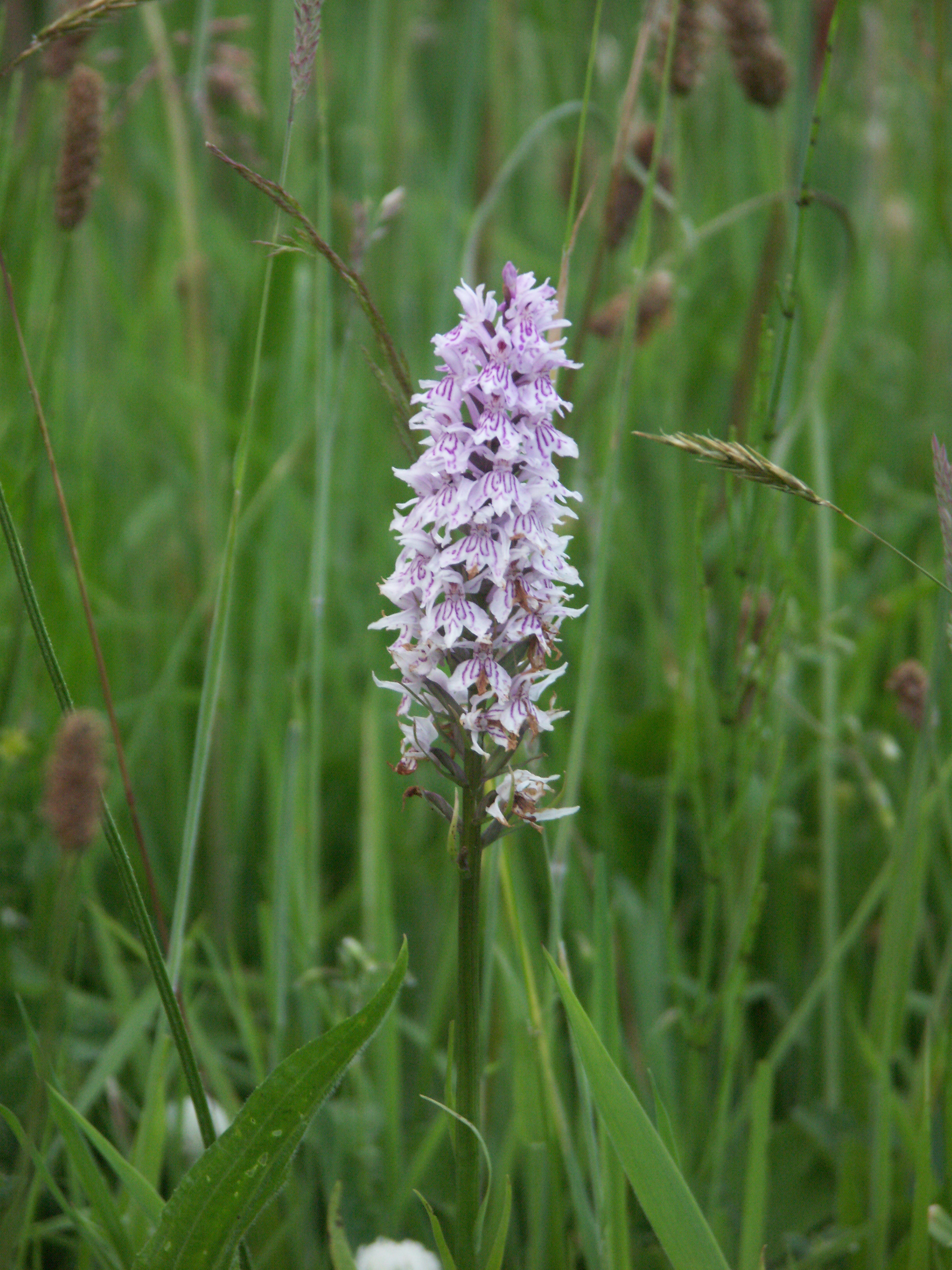
Common orchid by the Afon Clun at Talbot Green

The Afon Clun and Nant Dowlais contain minnow, stickleback, stone loach, lamprey, and eel. The species European bullhead (Cottus gobio) were also present, until a pollution incident in 2000 CE (see Industry below). In addition, the Clun contains roach and chub.

Among the species in the flood-meadows adjacent to the Afon Clun is the common orchid. The river's banks contain broadleaf woodland as well as invasive plants such as Himalayan balsam and Japanese knotweed.

Several species of dragonfly and damselfly hunt on the river. Other species present include bats, badger, dormouse, otter, great crested newt and the marsh fritillary butterfly, of which bats, dormouse, otter and great crested newt are European Protected Species. There is evidence that otters use Nant Dowlais and Nant Myddlyn, as well as the Clun and several species of bat have been sighted in the area, including Natterer's, long-eared, noctule and pipistrelle.

The Clun flows through, and close to, several areas defined in the UK Biodiversity Action Plan (BAP) as 'Areas of Ecological Significance'. Birds of 'conservation concern' recorded in surveys of the area are bullfinch, kingfisher, linnet, reed bunting skylark, and song thrush.

Hedgerows throughout the area qualify for protection, under the Hedgerows Regulations 1997.

Domesticated animals – horses and sheep – are kept in many of the fields bordering the river. Farmers have been encouraged to fence off access to the river for their animals, to prevent erosion of the riverbank and to prevent organophosphates (and the alternative synthetic pyrethroids) used in sheep dip, from contaminating the river.

=== Industry ===
Two companies in the area around the Afon Clun valley are regulated by a system known as Integrated Pollution Control (IPC). They are Nipa Laboratories, at Llantwit Fardre, who operate processes involving the manufacture and use of organic chemicals, and Maxibrite, who produce smokeless fuels at Mwyndy, using carbonisation processes. IPC attempts to minimise the effect of industrial processes on the environment. Coal Products, who produced foundry coke at the Cwm Coke Works at Tynant, Beddau, were also regulated by IPC until the works closed in 2002. Under IPC the Environment Agency ensure that: "in carrying out a prescribed process the operator shall use BATNEEC (Best Available Techniques Not Entailing Excessive Cost) for:

i) preventing the release of substances prescribed for any environmental medium or, where that is not practicable by such means, for reducing the release of such substances to a minimum and for rendering harmless any such substances which are so released; and

ii) for rendering harmless any other substances which might cause harm if released into any environmental medium."

Since the end of coal mining in south Wales, the Afon Clun gradually returned to the condition in which it was before the Industrial Revolution, although it has been polluted several times since then. In 2000 CE ammonia discharged into Mwyndy Brook killed over 600 fish and eels, including the complete resident population of a conservation species known as bullheads, and many hundreds of small coarse fish fry, in the Clun. The coal briquetting plant that caused the pollution were fined a total of GBP31,816 in fines and costs, after a prosecution brought by the Environment Agency. Nant Myddlyn, a tributary on the Clun, suffered from a diesel spill near Llantwit Fardre, in early 2008 CE, which was raised at the Senedd.

Between 1994 and 1996, water quality at Nant Myddlyn, from Tynant to the confluence with the Nant Dowlais, was noted as RE5; at Afon Clun, from the confluence with the Myddlyn to Rhiwsaeson village, the quality was RE4. The deterioration of water quality was caused by the discharge of industrial effluent from Cwm Coke Works at Tynant. An effective effluent treatment plant was recommissioned to solve the discharge problem and water quality soon returned to RE2, until the works' closure in 2002 CE.

Since Coal Products' Cwm Coking Works closed, water abstraction from the Afon Clun area is minimal. The Works at Tynant had used up to 3.9 million litres per day (Ml/d) from Nant Myddlyn and a borehole and occasionally, water abstraction at the Works had caused Nant Myddlyn to dry up.

=== Floodplain ===
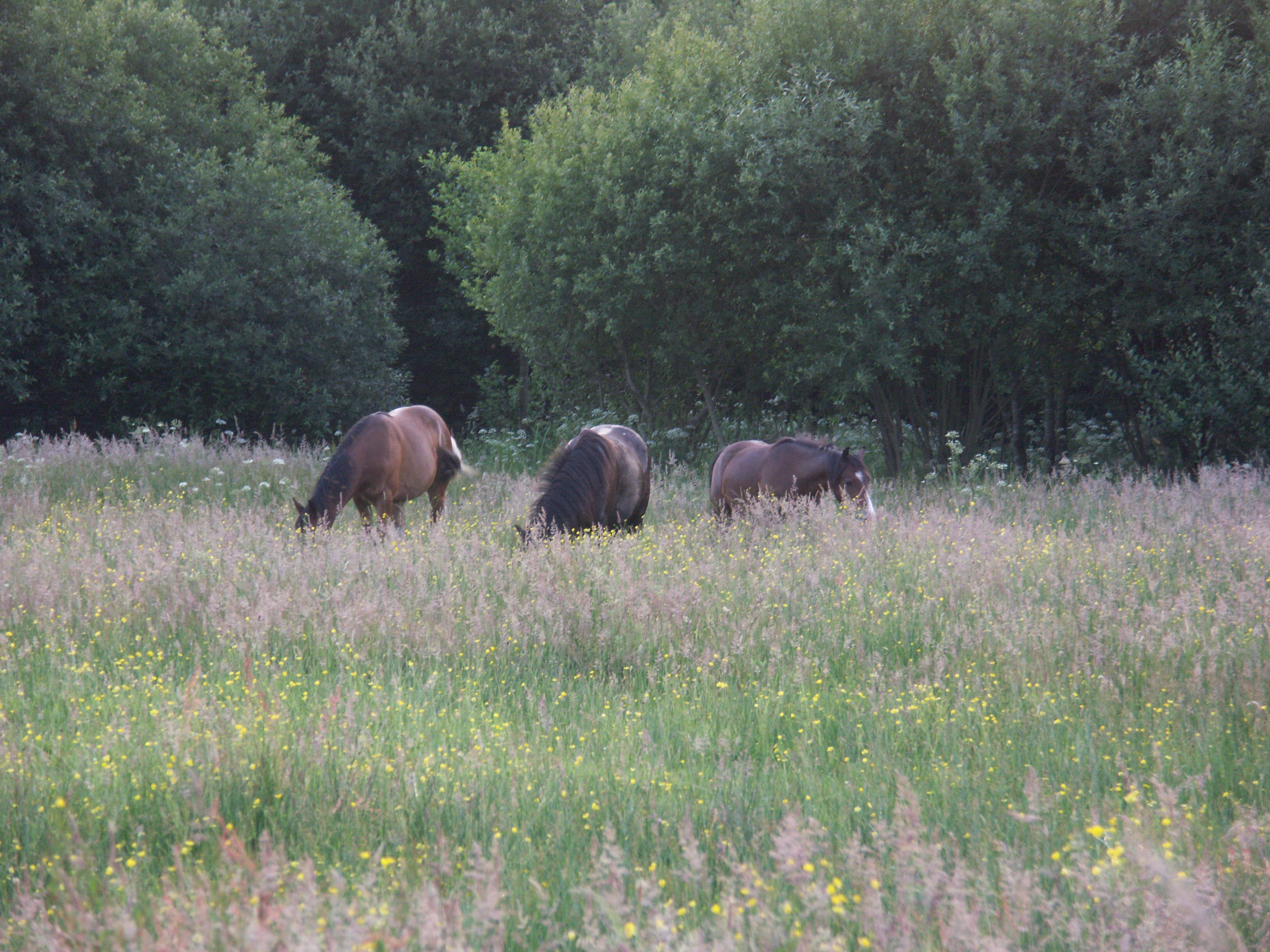
The flood-meadow north of the Afon Clun at Talbot Green

Upstream, the river has steep slopes and shallow soils. Around 18% of the catchment area is defined as urban and, as the area has a relatively high rainfall, the combination produces a catchment that responds rapidly to rainfall and has flooding problems throughout. Further flooding problems occur at its confluence when the river levels in the River Ely are high.

Areas of flat land next to waterways are attractive to developers. Parts of the floodplain between Cross Inn and Pontyclun have been developed over the last 20 years, reducing the area available for the river to overflow. The A473 Talbot Green by-pass, Glamorgan Vale Retail Park, Leekes department store, Y Pant School, Ynysddu Farm housing estate and the houses along the former Pant y Dderwyn meadow have all been built where the river water used to go when its banks could no longer contain the volume. Some earthen banks (the pre-existing flood defence) are incorporated in the gardens of the Ynysddu estate. Y Pant School was constructed on the floodplain against the advice of the then Glamorgan River Board.

The authorities now consider the floodplain as an integral part of the overall river system. Under the Environment Agency's Floodplain Policy, it is deemed essential that it is kept free from development for flood defence reasons. The Clun is liable to overflow its northern bank for about one and a half miles, between Cross Inn and the River Ely. This floodplain provides a wetland wildlife habitat. In addition, horses are kept in the meadows, when the ground is not too waterlogged.

== History ==
From the end of the last ice age, between 12,000 and 10,000 years before present (BP), mesolithic hunter-gatherers from Central Europe began to migrate to Great Britain. They would have been able to walk between Continental Europe and Great Britain on dry land before the postglacial rise in sea level around 8000 BP. As the area was heavily wooded and movement would have been restricted, it is likely that people also came to what is now Wales by boat from the Iberian Peninsula. These neolithic colonists integrated with the indigenous people, who gradually changed from being hunter-gatherers to being settled farmers. They cleared the forests to establish pasture and to cultivate the land.

Over the following centuries the local people assimilated new immigrants and exchanged ideas with the Bronze Age and Iron Age Celtic cultures. Together with the approximate areas now known as Brecknockshire, Monmouthshire and the rest of Glamorgan, the Afon Clun Valley was settled by a Celtic British tribe called the Silures.

=== Bronze Age ===
There is a group of five round barrows, near the river's source at the top of The Garth, thought to be Bronze Age, one of which supports a trig. pillar on its flat top.

=== Iron Age ===
Overlooking the Clun at Rhiwsaeson, Caerau hillfort (51.5398°N 3.3505°W) is an oval Iron Age enclosure, measuring 755 feet (230 m) (east–west) by 590 feet (180 m). Dating from 700 BCE, it is one of the largest known hill forts in south Wales. The defences comprise a set of two banks and ditches, with a counterscarp bank. Originally, the bank stood approximately 25 feet (7.6 metres) high, though much of it has been destroyed, and only 100 feet (30 m) of the north east (the best preserved) part remain. Where the hillside below is steepest, to the south, there are no outer stone defences, though the inner ramparts continue to the cliff edge. The entrance to the fort, at the south west, is approximately 25 feet (7.6 metres) wide, between parallel in-turned banks about 50 feet (15 m) long.

Caerau Hillfort was the subject of a forgery in a book called 'Gwentian Brut' in The Myvyrian Archaiology of Wales, edited by Jones, O.; Williams, E.; Pughe, W.O. (1801). The forgery was fabricated by Edward Williams Iolo Morganwg) while he was one of the editors of Myvyrian Archaiology; it suggested that Caerau Hillfort was the site of the "Battle of Rhiwsaeson" in 873 CE.

=== Tudor iron making ===
Lead mines were opened in Mwyndy (between Llantrisant and Groesfaen) in the "Parke of Cloune" in May 1531 CE. By August 1531 iron ore was being mined there. Iron smelting began nearby during the summer of 1532, with one bloomery furnace site at Mwyndy, and (probably) another smaller smelting site at Rhiwsaeson, employing 4 blowers (hewars), with three blowers operating the bellows at any one time. They produced up to two blooms, of 50 kg per bloom per day, from 150 kg of ore, taking 6 to 7 hours each to produce. Charcoal to heat the furnaces was probably derived locally, from "Cloune Park" — mention is made by Rice Lewis in his 'A breviat of Glamorgan' (1595 and 1600) of the destruction of the forests of Garth Maelog and Allt Griffith because of the ironworks. The iron mines were leased by the crown in 1539, granting rights to mine and make iron and to build water powered ironworks within three miles of Cloune Park for 21 years. There is no evidence to suggest that either iron mining or smelting continued in the area after the 16th century.

The name of the house built on or near the ironworks probably derived from the words mwyn (English: mine), and dŷ (soft mutation of tŷ) (English: house). And from that, the area name of Mwyndy.

The mine was either reopened, or dug out near the original workings, about 1859. Over one million tons of iron ore (goethite) were mined at Mwyndy before the mine closed in 1884. The resulting lake feeds into Nant Mwyndy.

=== Coal ===
The Afon Clun marks the southern edge of the South Wales Coalfield. There are several former collieries to the north of the river. Many pits were begun in the 1860s in Beddau, Ty'n-y-nant and Gelynog pits being the most important, prior to which the area was mostly farmland. Cwm Colliery was sunk by the Great Western Colliery Company Limited in 1909 and this marked a rapid expansion of the population. In 1923 the Powell Duffryn Steam Coal Company sunk the Ynysmaerdy Colliery at Llantrisant, also known as the New Duffryn and Llantrisant Colliery, it had three shafts, employing 216 men. The Cwm was acquired by Powell Duffryn in 1928. In 1931 an underground railway linked the Cwm to the Maritime Colliery, Pontypridd and by 1934 the Cwm employed 100 men on the surface and 780 men underground. A methane gas explosion on bank holiday Monday, 2 June 1941, killed four men — Ernest Evans (Banksman), Noah Fletcher (Winding Engineman), John Gregor (Manager), and David Thomas (Switchboard Attendant) — and destroyed most of the surface buildings. The explosion would have caused far greater loss of life had it not occurred on a bank holiday. The colliery never reopened after the accident.

The mines were nationalised in 1947 and in 1957 another underground railway linked the Cwm with Coedely Colliery, north of Llantrisant. The merger of these two pits created the largest colliery in the south Wales coalfield. At the peak of production in 1960, the Cwm Colliery employed 1,470 men and produced 324,794 tons of coal. British Coal closed Cwm Colliery in 1986, a year after the Miners' Strike.

== Ffordd-y-Bryniau ==
Ffordd-y-Bryniau is a 21 miles (34 km) ridgeway walk through Taff-Ely (Welsh: Taf-Elái), beginning at Mynydd Maendy (SS977861), Bridgend in the west, and ending at Caerphilly mountain (Welsh: Mynydd Caerffili) (ST153856), in the east. The route passes through Llantrisant Forest, Llantrisant Town and Caerau Hillfort, only dropping from the ridgeway at the Ely Valley and Nant Myddlyn. The Waymark is a yellow/black named disc, with a hills motif.

The route links with the Ogwr Ridgeway Walk, which joins the Coed Morgannwg Way, the Taff Trail near Taffs Well and the Rhymney Valley Ridgeway Walk at Caerphilly Mountain.

== Future developments ==
Improvements to the road network, in particular the A4119 linking the Rhondda Valleys to the M4, through Tonyrefail and Talbot Green, brought development pressure to the area around Llantrisant. Extensive housing development has taken place recently in the villages along the A473, the main Pontypridd to Bridgend road, linking Llantwit Fardre to Llantrisant, Talbot Green, Llanharan and Pencoed, the road that runs parallel to the Afon Clun from Rhiwsaeson to Pontyclun. This development brought further pressure on the road system, which led to the revival of the 1989 plans for the Church Village bypass. Preparatory work on the bypass began in February 2008, and an announcement was made on 12 March 2008 that the Welsh Assembly Government had given the go-ahead for work to start in the "next few months".

An Environmental Constraints Plan has been compiled and updated from ecological surveys of 1999, 2000, 2003, 2004, 2006 and 2007, with a view to minimising the effect of the bypass scheme. Findings from the surveys show the presence of bat, badger, dormouse, otter, great crested newt and the marsh fritillary butterfly.

Leading on from the Church Village Bypass scheme, is a proposal to dual the existing A473 Talbot Green Bypass, between the Church Village Bypass and the former headquarters of the South Wales Fire and Rescue Service (who moved to Llantrisant in 2009) at Lanelay Hall. The scheme is "highly dependent on the level of development activity in the area" however, and Rhondda Cynon Taf's Strategic Site 7: Mwyndy/Talbot Green Area, in particular.

A single track railway runs north from Pontyclun station, turning west at Talbot Green to run roughly parallel to the Clun, alongside the north of the A473. At Cross Inn the track turns north east, running north of the Caerau Hillfort, and originally ran to the Cwm Coking Works at Tynant, Beddau, although the track has been dismantled to the east of Cross Inn. All the original railway paraphernalia remains intact between Talbot Green and Pontyclun, including the track, signals and bridges with cages above the track to prevent people throwing things (or themselves) onto the trains, tracks or coal wagons. The track is still embedded in the road where it crosses the A473, the warning lights remain at the roadside and the road signs warn drivers to stop if they see warning lights flash at the level crossing. A recent consultative study (Sewta Rail Strategy Study—January 2006) has considered the possibility of reopening the Pontyclun to Beddau branch line, as a passenger line rather than just for freight. This would require new stations at Talbot Green, Llantrisant, Gwaun Meisgyn and Beddau (Tynant).

== See also ==
- Britons (historic)
- Cairn
- Ecology
- Ecosystem ecology
- List of rivers of Wales
- Mesolithic
- Pollution
- Prehistoric Britain
- River Clun, Shropshire
- Tumulus
- Water quality
- Welsh placenames
