= Pontyclun =

Town in Rhondda Cynon Taf, Wales

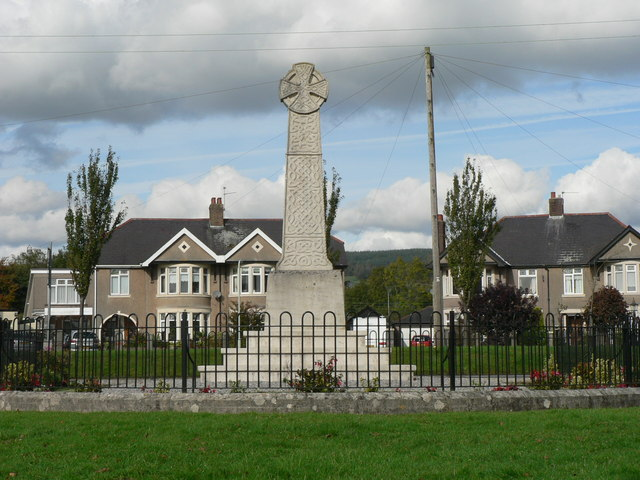

- Location within Rhondda Cynon Taf
- Population: 8,086 (2011)
- OS grid reference: SS985832
- Principal area: Rhondda Cynon Taf
- Preserved county: Mid Glamorgan
- Country: Wales
- Sovereign state: United Kingdom
- Post town: PONTYCLUN
- Postcode district: CF72
- Dialling code: 01443
- Police: South Wales
- Fire: South Wales
- Ambulance: Welsh
- UK Parliament: Cardiff West
- Senedd Cymru – Welsh Parliament: Pontypridd
- List of places UK Wales Rhondda Cynon Taf 51.521588°N 3.391256°W Community map: Map of the community

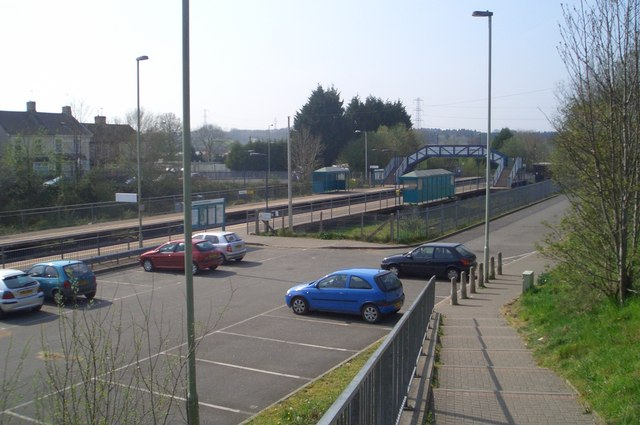
Pontyclun railway station

Pontyclun (or Pont-y-clun) is a town and community located in the county borough of Rhondda Cynon Taf, Wales.

Pontyclun translates from the Welsh language as 'bridge [over] the River Clun', the Clun being a tributary of the River Ely that runs through Pontyclun. A bridge crosses the Afon Clun just above its confluence with the Ely.

The town is served by Pontyclun railway station on the South Wales Main Line. It has its own local rugby, football, bowls and petanque clubs.

The town falls under the remit of Pontyclun Town Council, which represents the communities of Brynsadler, Castell y Mwnws, Groes-faen, Miskin, Mwyndy, Pontyclun, Talygarn, and Ynysddu.

== History ==
The influx of workers for the iron ore and coal mining industries, and the coming of the South Wales Railway in 1851, changed Pontyclun from a 20-acre (8 ha) farm with just four to five households into a burgeoning Victorian industrial town. The Coedcae Colliery (first listed in 1856) and the Bute iron ore mine (which opened in October 1852) caused the population growth. By 1871, the census returns record an influx of Cornish miners who had suffered from the collapse of the copper mining industry in Cornwall. By 1870 the industries of the area had been expanded by the coming of the Ely Tin Plate Works, The Pipe Works and The Steam Joinery Company.

During World War I, the Pontyclun Institute (Pontyclun Institute Athletic Club in 2026) was loaned to the Red Cross as a hospital. It provided care for nearly 700 servicemen between 1915 and 1919.

== Administration ==
The Town Council was formed in April 1985 (initially as a community council) and consists of eleven elected community councillors who are all residents of the area. They act on behalf of local people to try and preserve the best aspects of the community, while also encouraging and supporting developments that will benefit the whole community and ensure that it will continue to thrive. The council monitors all local planning applications and, where appropriate, suggests amendments or submits written objections.

The community was awarded town status in September 2023, and then on had a town council. This was the result of a unanimous resolution of the then Community Council, following a grass roots campaign by Cllr Daniel and supported by Cllr W. Owen.

=== Electoral ward ===
Pont-y-clun was an electoral ward to Mid Glamorgan County Council electing one county councillor from 1989 and 1993 elections, subsequently (from 1995) becoming a ward to Rhondda Cynon Taf County Borough Council, initially electing two councillors and from 2022 three.

== Religion ==
Bethel Baptist Chapel was built circa 1876. Bethel relocated to Bethel Baptist Church Centre on Heol Miskin in 1993. Cwrt Bethel is on the site of the old chapel.

St Paul's church, Pontyclun was erected in 1895 as a district church within the Anglican parish of Llantrisant. In 1924, the new parish of Pontyclun and Talygarn was constituted from the parish of Llantrisant.

Bethel Baptist Church, Hope Presbyterian Church and St Paul's Church are still active places of worship.

== Schools and education ==
The village is served by Y Pant School, a secondary school with about 1,150 pupils, situated on the outskirts of Talbot Green where it meets Pontyclun. In 2000 it was ranked 49th in Wales in terms of its GCSE results (based on 5 GCSEs, grades A-C). Since then, exam results have improved dramatically and according to the latest inspection report from Estyn, the school now has a pass rate of 72% which means it is in equal 19th place in Wales, or in the top 10%. It is also the best performing secondary school in Rhondda Cynon Taf, just ahead of St. John the Baptist School (Aberdare).

The town also houses Pontyclun Primary school which underwent a major renovation in 2024-25 replacing the 1920s school with a modern 21st century design. Welsh language education is catered for at YGGG Llantrisant school close by in Miskin

== Sport ==
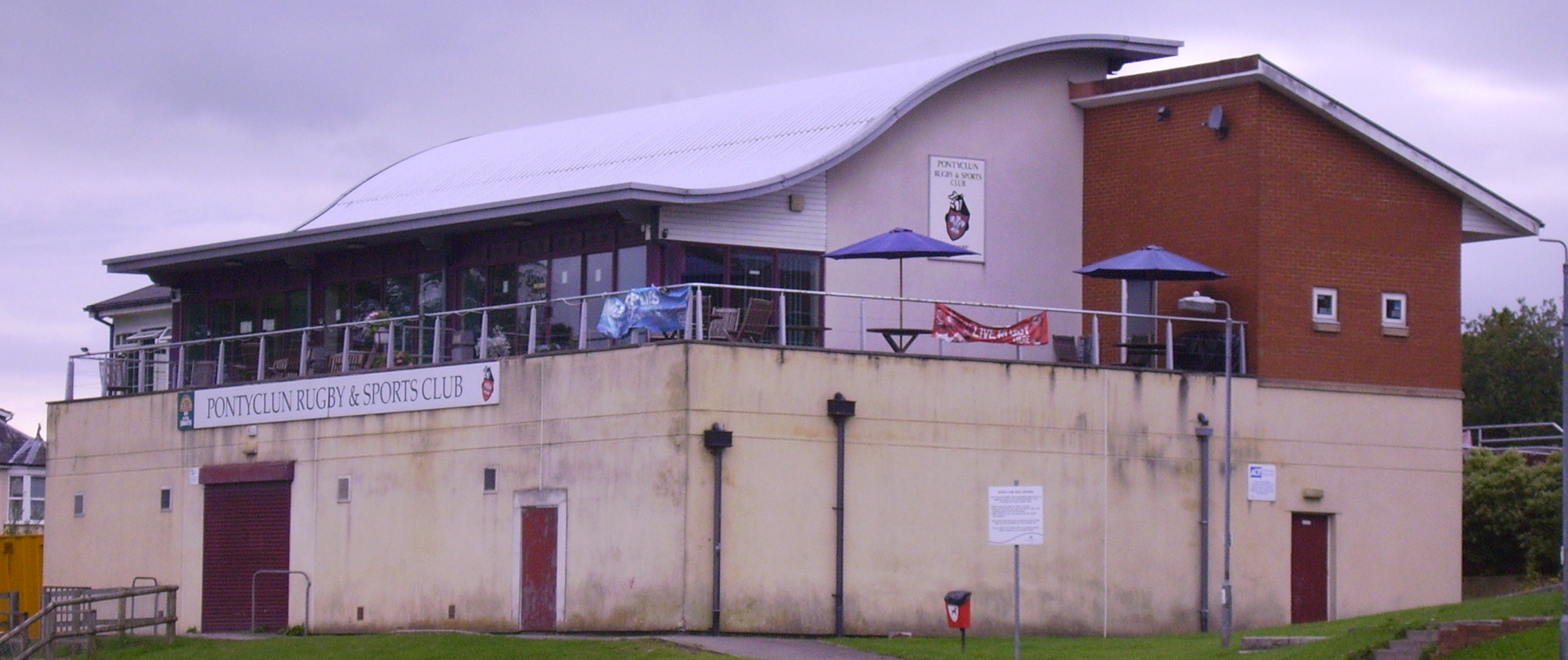
Pontyclun rugby union club

Pontyclun has both a football and rugby union team. Pontyclun Football Club were formed in 1896 and joined the Football Association of Wales in 1922. Pontyclun Rugby Football Club (otherwise known as the Pontyclun Badgers), were formed in 1886 and joined the Welsh Rugby Union in 1887.

Pontyclun also has a Bowls Club established in 1932 as part of the Athletic Club in the heart of the town and other sports clubs including Pontyclun Petanque club, Pontyclun Flyers (Cycling) and Pontyclun Road Runners (Running)

There are several notable sporting scions including.

Tommy Rees played Rugby Union for Wales winning 3 caps in the 1920s and later played rugby league for Great Britain, and Oldham. More recently Harri Deaves was also selected for Wales in 2025.

Pontyclun born Keith Pontin (Cardiff City and Wales) was a Welsh International football player who played for Wales twice.

Zoe Bäckstedt and Elynor Bäckstedt are Welsh international cyclists and Enoch Jenkins a 3 time Olympic sports shooter all come from this area

== Crown Brewery ==
The South Wales & Monmouth United Clubs Brewery Co. Ltd. purchased the small family brewery owned by D & T Davies in 1919. This Company had been formed to supply the expanding number of Workingmen's Clubs, which were having difficulties with supply of beer from the many local breweries throughout the area. The Sunday Closing (Wales) Act 1881 had fuelled the expanding number of clubs that did not have to close on Sunday, as was the case with public houses.

By 1936 the brewery was producing 500 barrels per week, which continued to increase to 900 in 1938. This growth was halted by the outbreak of the Second World War in 1939 but when the war ended in 1945 the growth took off again. By 1954 the old brewery had been replaced by a completely new building that was big enough to produce the 1,200 barrels per week that the clubs demanded at that time. In 1988 Crown merged with Wales' oldest brewery, Buckley's of Llanelly to form the Crown Buckley Brewery. In the spring of 1999, after 80 years of trading, the brewery closed following the takeover of the company by Cardiff based Brains Brewery.

== People connected with Pontyclun ==
- Zoe Bäckstedt. Professional racing cyclist. Born in Pontyclun.
- Christopher Cole. Royal Navy officer. Died in Pontyclun.
- Dr Wynne Davies MBE. Author, judge, historian and breeder of Welsh mountain ponies. Lived in Pontyclun.
- Harri Deaves. Rugby union player. Born in Pontyclun.
- Enoch Jenkins Olympic Sports shooter born in Pontyclun
- Kingsley Jones. International Rugby union player. Died in Pontyclun.
- Willie Llewellyn. International rugby union player. Died in Pontyclun.
- Keith Pontin. Professional footballer. Born in Pontyclun.
- Tommy Rees. Rugby union and rugby league player. Born in Pontyclun.
- William Webb Ellis. Credited with the invention of rugby. Paternal grandfather was born in Pontyclun.
- Arthur Howard Williams. Welsh chess champion. Born in Pontyclun.
- Mark Wool. Rugby union and rugby league player. Grew up in Pontyclun.
