= Mark Wool =

Wales international rugby league footballer

Personal information
- Full name: Mark James Wool
- Born: 10 February 1990 (age 36) Pontypridd, Rhondda Cynon Taf, Wales
- Height: 5 ft 8 in (173 cm)
- Weight: 16 st 1 lb (102 kg)

Playing information
- Position: Loose forward
Club
Years	Team	Pld	T	G	FG	P
≤2010–10	Leeds Rhinos
Representative
Years	Team	Pld	T	G	FG	P
2010–Present	Wales	1
- Source: As of 14 May 2012

Mark Wool (born 10 February 1990), also known by the nickname of "Woolly"', is a Welsh former rugby union and professional rugby league footballer. He played at representative level rugby league (RL) for Wales, and at club level for Leeds Rhinos, as a loose forward.

== International honours ==
In 2009, Wool captained the Great Britain Under-18's team on their tour of Australia. Wool won a cap for Wales while at Leeds Rhinos in 2010, and also played for the Great Britain Community Lions with a tour to Australia, and a second tour in 2011. Mark then played for Huddersfield Giants RFL. He started his rugby league career at Valley Cougars at the age of 17; previously to this he played rugby union from the age of seven, playing for Pontyclun RFU minis and juniors and then for youth and played a few games for the first team.

== Personal life ==
Mark is the son of Caroline and Andrew Wool. He grew up in Pontyclun, where his family still live, and attended Pontyclun Primary school and Y Pant School. He is the eldest of three siblings, Chris and Carrie. When he was 19 he moved to Leeds to attend Leeds Metropolitan University. He left after deferring his second year. Mark currently lives in Leeds with his Wife (Fran) and their son and daughter. He currently works as regional manager for Arc inspiration.
