= Enoch Jenkins =

Enoch Jenkins may refer to:

- Enoch Jenkins (sports shooter) (1892-1984), Welsh sports shooter
- Enoch Jenkins (lawyer) (1895-1960), British lawyer
