= Hockering Wood =

Woodland in Norfolk, England

Coordinates: 52.687°N 1.064°E

- Site of Special Scientific Interest
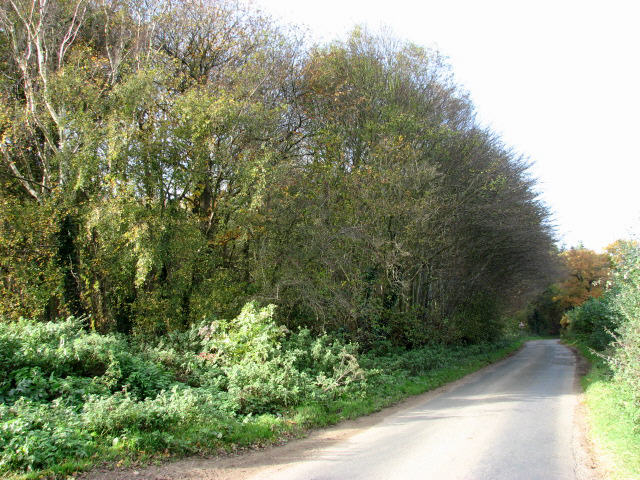
- Location of Hockering Wood.
- Area of search: Norfolk
- Grid reference: TG 072 143
- Interest: Biological
- Area: 89.5 hectares (221 acres)
- Notification date: 1984
- Location map: Magic Map

Hockering Wood is an 89.5-hectare (221-acre) biological Site of Special Scientific Interest east of Dereham in Norfolk, England.

This is one of the largest areas of ancient, semi-natural woodland in the county. It has many rare species, especially of bryophytes, and there are ponds which have populations of great crested newts, a protected species under the Wildlife and Countryside Act 1981.

The site is private, but is publicly accessible between April and August.
