= Great Crest =

Great Crest may refer to:

- Great crested grebe
- Great crested newt
