= River Clun =

River Clun may refer to:

- River Clun, Shropshire, a river in Shropshire and Herefordshire Counties, England
- River Clun, South Wales, a tributary of the River Ely in the counties of Cardiff and Rhondda Cynon Taf, Wales
