= Harri Deaves =

Wales international rugby union player

- Born: Harri Llewellyn Deaves-Small; 13 June 2001 (age 25) Pontyclun, Wales
- Height: 1.82 m (5 ft 11 1/2 in)
- Weight: 96 kg (15.1 st; 212 lb)
- School: Y Pant School, Pontyclun

Rugby union career
- Position: Flanker
- Current team: Ospreys
Amateur team(s)
Years	Team	Apps	(Points)
- Pontyclun
- Bridgend College
Senior career
Years	Team	Apps	(Points)
2021–	Ospreys	51	(20)
International career
Years	Team	Apps	(Points)
2019	Wales U18		
2021	Wales U20	3	(0)
2025–	Wales	2	

Harri Deaves (born 13 June 2001) is a Welsh rugby union player, currently playing for United Rugby Championship side Ospreys (rugby union) and the Welsh National Team. His preferred position is flanker.

== Club career ==
=== Ospreys ===
Deaves was named in the Ospreys academy squad ahead of the 2021–22 season. He made his senior debut on the 23rd of January 2022 in Round 4 of the 2021–22 European Rugby Champions Cup in the match against Sale Sharks. He also scored a debut try.

After graduating from the Ospreys Academy in 2022, Deaves signed his first professional contract with the region on a two-year deal.

On 11 October 2025, Deaves made his 50th appearance for the Ospreys in a United Rugby Championship match against Zebre Parma.

== International career ==
=== Wales U20 ===
Deaves was selected for the Wales under-20 squad for the 2021 Six Nations Under 20s Championship. He made his under-20 debut in Round 1 of the competition on 19 June 2021 against Italy.

He was subsequently named in the starting lineup at openside flanker for the Round 2 match against Ireland.

Deaves earned his third cap of the championship in Round 5, featuring against Scotland.

=== Wales ===
Deaves was called up to the Welsh Senior International squad in the 2025 end-of-year rugby union internationals to replace Jac Morgan who was out injured. He made his senior debut against New Zealand on 22 November 2025.

Deaves was named in the squad for the 2026 Six Nations by Steve Tandy.

== Personal life ==
Deaves has worked as a roofer.
