= Y Pant School =

- Ysgol Y Pant

Location
- Cowbridge Road, Talbot Green; Pontyclun, Rhondda Cynon Taf, CF72 8YQ; United Kingdom; 51.531°N 3.384°W

Information
- Type: Community school
- Motto: Welsh: Byw trwy ddysgu (Living through Learning)
- Local authority: Rhondda Cynon Taf
- Department for Education URN: 401818 Tables
- Head teacher: Bev Cheetham
- Teaching staff: 70.8 (on an FTE basis)
- Gender: Mixed
- Age range: 11–18
- Enrolment: 1,323 (2018)
- Student to teacher ratio: 18.7
- Language: English
- Houses: Padraig; Aneurin; Nerth; Tirion
- Colours: Navy and Royal Blue
- Website: www.ypant.com

Y Pant School (Welsh: Ysgol Y Pant) is an 11–18 mixed, English-medium community comprehensive secondary school and sixth form in Talbot Green, Pontyclun, Rhondda Cynon Taf, Wales.

== History ==
=== Construction ===
Since the original school was built, two main buildings have been added: the sports hall and the "new block", built in 2006.

The original school building, gym and DT block and boiler house was built in the 1950s, with a science, cookery, languages and art building being built in 1977.

Several portable buildings were added throughout the 1980s - early 2000's.

In recent years, Y Pant School has seen a number of new buildings added: the sports hall opened in 1996, the "new block" opened in 2002, the new changing rooms opened in 2006 and In 2016, the £24 million new school building was completed and all the original buildings including the 1950s main building and 1970s language block being demolished, with the new block and the school gym being refurbished.

In July 2024, the new ‘Rose Barnes’ building was opened in honour of a long serving governor and to serve as extra capacity to students across the borough.

=== 1986 arson attack ===
An arson attack destroyed the Biology and Physics laboratories on Sunday 9 March 1986, costing £288,000. A burning ceiling panel fell onto the burglar alarm, which alerted the police station. The police visited the school, saw the fire, and called the fire service.

Firemen arrived from Pontypridd, Pontyclun, Pencoed, and Gilfach Goch, taking 90 minutes to put out the flames.

Three youths were arrested the day after, after being spotted by the caretaker. The three had taken petrol into the school. On 23 June 1986 an 18 year old was given two years, a 17 year old received 15 months, and a 16-year received 9 months, at Cardiff Court.

== Curriculum ==
In October 2011, the school was inspected under the new Estyn framework and was judged to be an 'Excellent' school in terms of its current performance, prospects for improvement, standards, pupil outcomes, teaching and leadership.

== Notable alumni ==
- Caroline Jones, Welsh UKIP Party leader
- Marmalade, RuPaul's Drag Race UK
- Harri Deaves, Professional Rugby Player
- Sophie Powell, Musical Theatre Performer
