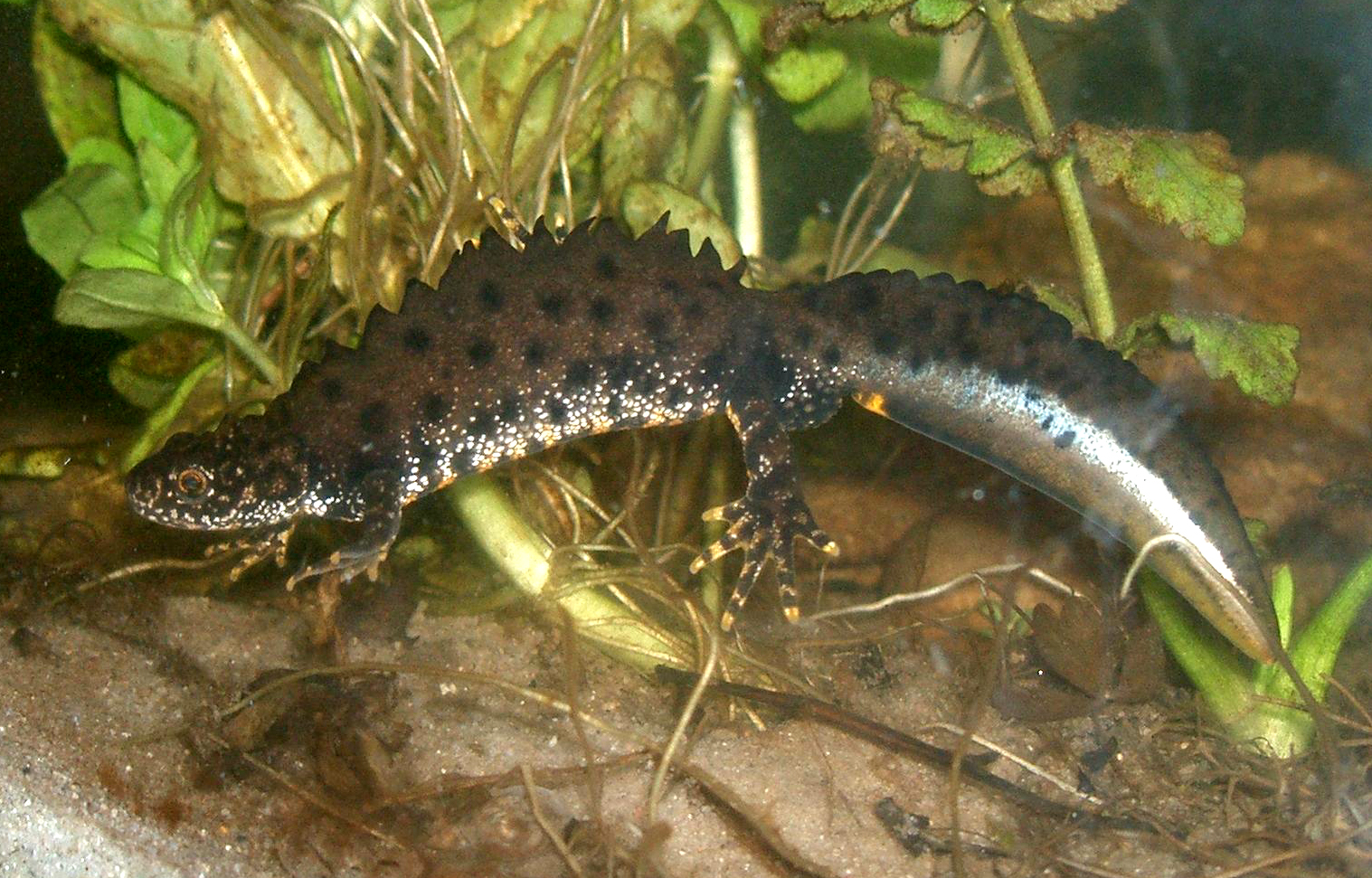
- Male during breeding season

Conservation status
- Least Concern (IUCN 3.1)

Scientific classification
- Kingdom: Animalia
- Phylum: Chordata
- Class: Amphibia
- Order: Urodela
- Family: Salamandridae
- Genus: Triturus
- Species: T. cristatus

Binomial name
- Triturus cristatus (Laurenti, 1768)
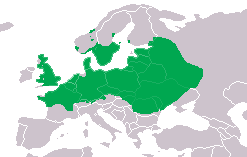

Synonyms
- Over 40, including: Lacertus aquatilis Garsault, 1764 (nomen oblitum); Triton cristatus Laurenti, 1768 (basionym); Triton blasii de l'Isle, 1862 (hybrid); Triton trouessarti Peracca, 1886 (hybrid)

= Northern crested newt =

Species of amphibian

The northern crested newt, great crested newt or warty newt (Triturus cristatus) is a newt species native to Great Britain, northern and central continental Europe and parts of Western Siberia. It is a large newt, with females growing up to 16 cm (6.3 in) long. Its back and sides are dark brown, while the belly is yellow to orange with dark blotches. During the breeding season, males develop a conspicuous jagged crest on their back and tail.

The northern crested newt spends most of the year on land, primarily in wooded areas of the lowlands. In spring, it moves to aquatic breeding sites, mainly larger fish-free ponds. Males court females with a ritualised display and deposit a spermatophore on the ground, which the female then picks up with her cloaca. After fertilisation, a female lays around 200 eggs, folding them into water plants. The larvae develop over two to four months before metamorphosing into terrestrial juveniles (efts). Both larvae and land-dwelling newts mainly feed on different invertebrates.

Several former subspecies of the northern crested newt are now recognised as separate species within the genus Triturus. Its closest relative is the Danube crested newt (T. dobrogicus). It sometimes forms hybrids with some of its relatives, including the marbled newt (T. marmoratus). Although it is currently the most widespread Triturus species, the northern crested newt was probably confined to small refugial areas in the Carpathians during the Last Glacial Maximum.

While the International Union for Conservation of Nature lists the northern crested newt as a species of Least Concern, its populations have been declining. The main threat is habitat destruction, for example, through urban sprawl. The species is also listed as a European Protected Species.

== Taxonomy ==
The northern crested newt was described as Triton cristatus by Josephus Nicolaus Laurenti in 1768. As Linnaeus had already used the name Triton for a genus of sea snails ten years before, Constantine Samuel Rafinesque introduced the new genus name Triturus in 1815, with T. cristatus as type species.

Over 40 scientific names introduced over time are now considered as synonyms, including Lacertus aquatilis, a nomen oblitum published four years before Laurenti's species name. Hybrids resulting from the cross of a crested newt male with a marbled newt (Triturus marmoratus) female were mistakenly described as distinct species Triton blasii, and the reverse hybrids as Triton trouessarti.

T. cristatus was long considered as a single species, the "crested newt", with several subspecies. However, substantial genetic differences between these subspecies were noted, eventually leading to their recognition as a distinct species, often collectively referred to as "T. cristatus species complex". There are now seven accepted species of crested newts, the most widespread of which is the northern crested newt.

== Description ==
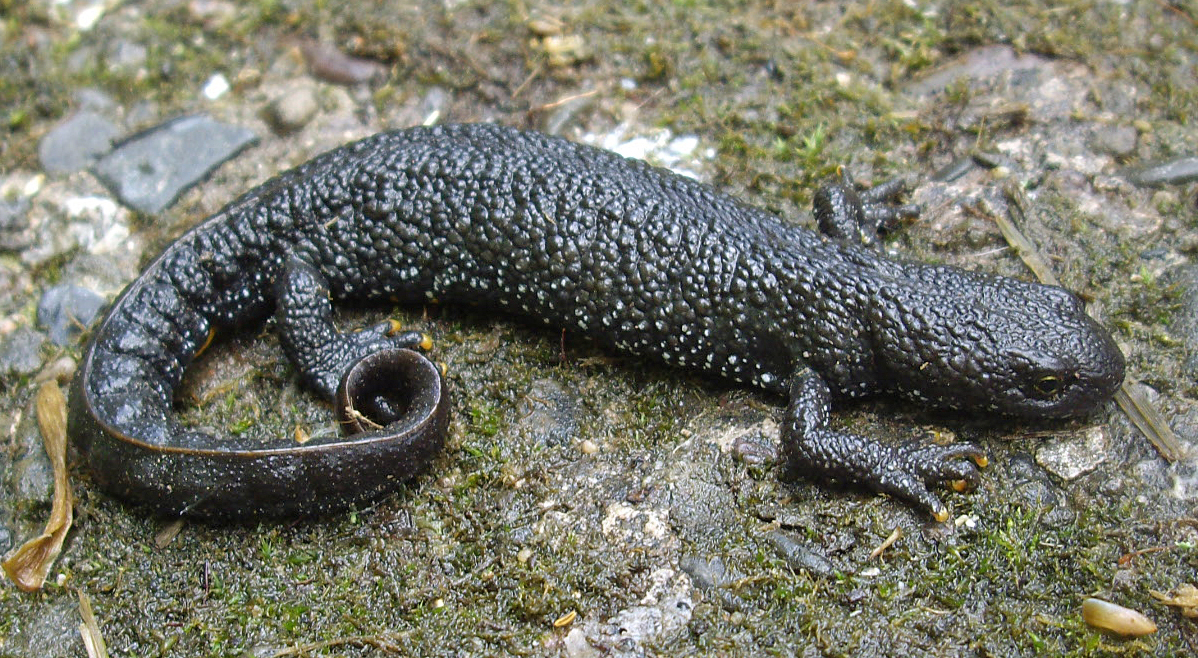
Side view of a female

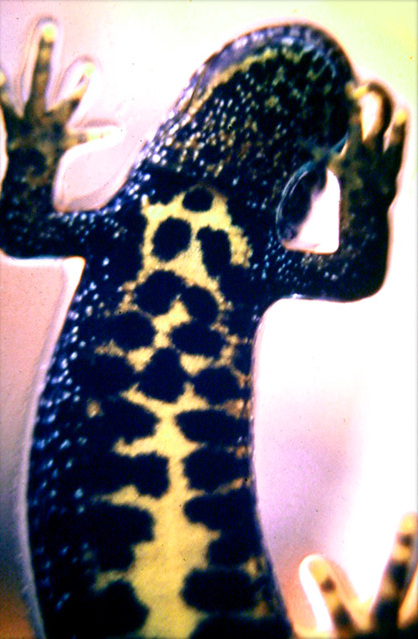
The belly is yellow to orange with black, well-defined blotches.

The northern crested newt is a relatively large newt species. Males typically grow to a total length of 13.5 cm (5.3 in), while females can reach 16 cm (6.3 in). Rare individuals of 20 cm (7.9 in) have been recorded. Other crested newt species are more stockily built; only the Danube crested newt (T. dobrogicus) is more slender. Body shape is correlated with skeletal build: The northern crested newt has 15 rib-bearing vertebrae, only the Danube crested newt has more (16–17), while the other, more stocky Triturus species have 14 or less.

The newts have rough skin, and are dark brown on their back and sides. They have black spots and heavy white stippling on their flanks. The female has a yellow line running along the lower edge of her tail. Their throats are yellow–black with fine white stippling and their bellies are yellow-orange with dark, irregular blotches.

During the aquatic breeding season, the males develop a crest that measures up to 1.5 cm (0.59 in) high. This runs along the back and tail but is interrupted at the tail base. The crest is heavily indented on the back but smoother on the tail. During breeding season, the male's cloaca swells and it has a blue–white flash running along the sides of the tail. Females do not develop a crest.

== Range ==
The northern crested newt is the most widespread and northerly crested newt species. The northern edge of its range runs from Great Britain through southern Fennoscandia to the Republic of Karelia in Russia; the southern margin runs through central France, southwest Romania, Moldavia and Ukraine, heading from there into central Russia and through the Ural Mountains. The eastern extent of the great crested newt's range reaches into Western Siberia, running from the Perm Krai to the Kurgan Oblast.

In western France, the species co-occurs and sometimes hybridises (see section Evolution below) with the marbled newt (Triturus marmoratus). In southeast Europe, its range borders that of the Italian crested newt (T. carnifex), the Danube crested newt (T. dobrogicus), the Macedonian crested newt (T. macedonicus) and the Balkan crested newt (T. ivanbureschi).

== Habitat ==
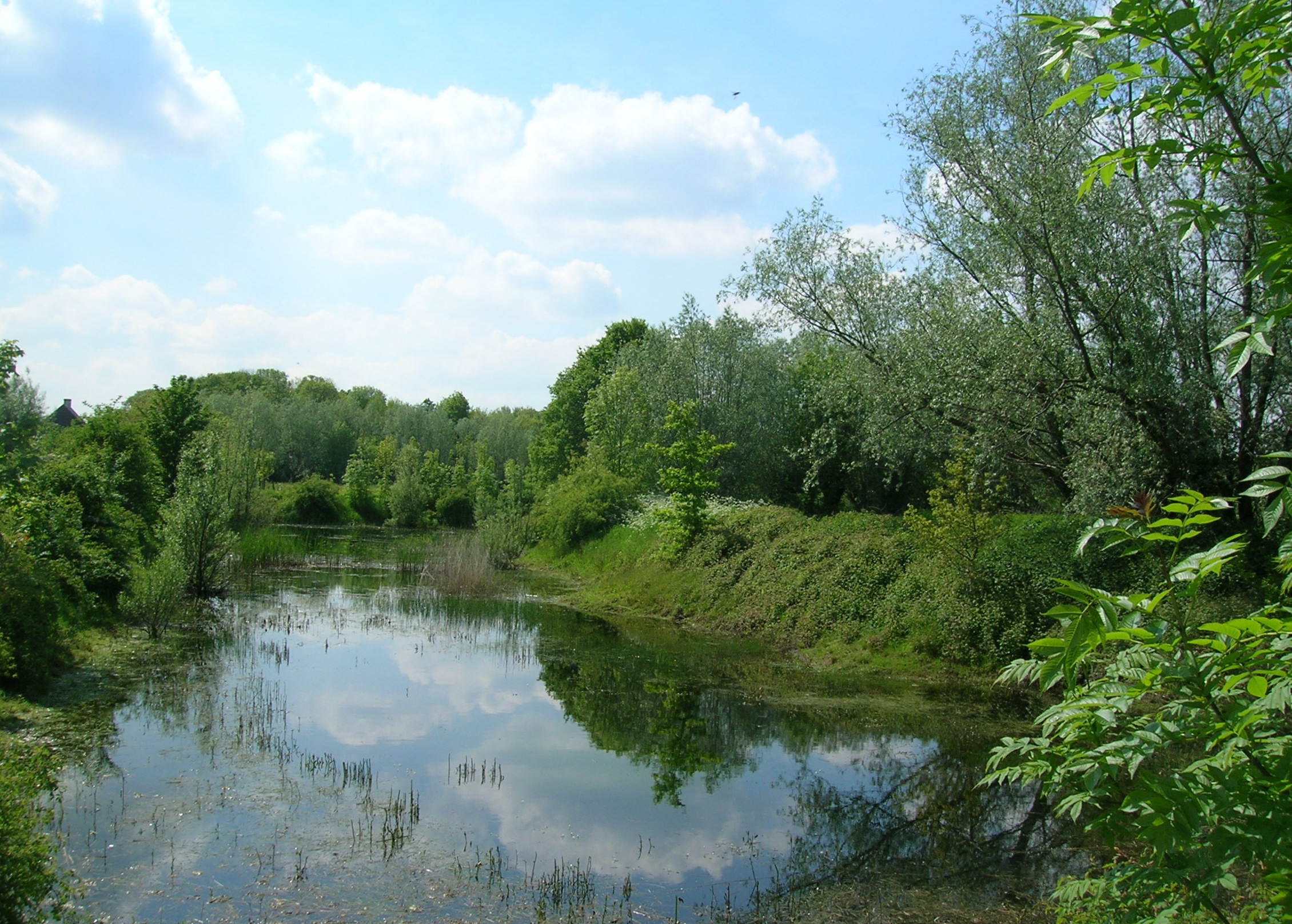
Large ponds with abundant vegetation are the preferred breeding habitats.

Great crested newts and their conservation in Wales, video by Natural Resources Wales

Outside of the breeding season, northern crested newts are mainly forest-dwellers. They prefer deciduous woodlands or groves, but conifer woodlands are also inhabited, particularly in the northernmost and southernmost ranges. In the absence of forests, other cover-rich habitats, as for example hedgerows, scrub, swampy meadows, or quarries, can be inhabited.

Preferred aquatic breeding sites are stagnant, mid- to large-sized, unshaded water bodies with abundant underwater vegetation but without fish (which prey on larvae). Typical examples are larger ponds, which need not be of natural origin; indeed, most ponds inhabited in the United Kingdom are human-made. Examples of other suitable secondary habitats are ditches, channels, gravel pit lakes, or garden ponds. Other newts that can sometimes be found in the same breeding sites are the smooth newt (Lissotriton vulgaris), the palmate newt (L. helveticus), the Carpathian newt (L. montadoni), the alpine newt (Ichthyosaura alpestris) and the marbled newt (Triturus marmoratus).

The northern crested newt is generally a lowland species but has been found up to 1,750 m (5,740 ft) in the Alps.

== Life cycle and behaviour ==
Like other newts, T. cristatus develops in the water as a larva and returns to the water each year to breed. Adults spend around seven months of the year on land. After completing their larval development in the first year, juveniles take another year or two to reach maturity; this process can take longer in the north and at higher elevations. The larval and juvenile stages are the riskiest for the newts, whereas adults have a higher survival rate. Once these risky stages have passed, adult newts usually live for seven to nine years, although some individuals have lived for up to 17 years in the wild.

Adult newts begin moving to their breeding sites in spring when temperatures stay above 4–5 °C (39–41 °F), usually in March. During the aquatic phase, crested newts are mostly nocturnal and, compared to smaller newt species, usually prefer the deeper parts of a water body, where they hide under vegetation. As with other newts, they must occasionally move to the surface to breathe air. The aquatic phase serves not only for reproduction, but also provides access to more abundant prey. Immature crested newts frequently return to the water in spring, even if they are not yet ready to breed.

During the terrestrial phase, the newts use hiding places such as logs, bark, planks, stone walls, or small mammal burrows; several individuals may occupy such refuges at the same time. Since the newts generally stay very close to their aquatic breeding sites, the quality of the surrounding terrestrial habitat largely determines whether an otherwise suitable water body will be colonised. Great crested newts may also climb vegetation during their terrestrial phase, although the exact purpose of this behaviour remains unclear.

The juveniles, also known as efts, often disperse to new breeding sites, while the adults generally return to the same breeding sites each year. The newts do not migrate very far; they can cover around 100 metres (110 yd) in one night and rarely disperse much farther than one kilometre (0.62 mi). Over most of their range, they hibernate in winter, mainly using subterranean hiding places, where many individuals will often congregate.

=== Diet and predators ===
Northern crested newts mainly consists of invertebrates. During the land phase, their prey include earthworms and other annelids, different insects and their larvae, woodlice, and snails and slugs. During the breeding season, they prey on various aquatic invertebrates (such as molluscs [particularly small bivalves], microcrustaceans, and insects), and also tadpoles and juveniles of other amphibians such as the common frog or common toad, and smaller newts (including conspecifics). Depending on their size, larvae eat small invertebrates and tadpoles, as well as smaller larvae of their own species.

The larvae are themselves eaten by various animals such as carnivorous invertebrates and water birds, and are especially vulnerable to predatory fish. Adults generally avoid predators through their hidden lifestyle but are sometimes eaten by herons and other birds, snakes such as the grass snake, and mammals such as shrews, badgers and hedgehogs. They secrete the poison tetrodotoxin from their skin, albeit much less than for example the North American Pacific newts (Taricha). The bright yellow or orange underside of crested newts is a warning coloration which is displayed in case of perceived danger. In such a posture, the newts typically roll up and secrete a milky substance.

=== Courtship and reproduction ===
Northern crested newt courtship in a pond, with male showing "lean-in" and tail-flapping behaviour

Northern crested newts, like their relatives in the genus Triturus, perform a complex courtship display, where the male attracts a female through specific body movements and releases pheromones to her. The males are territorial and use small patches of clear ground as leks, or courtship arenas. If successful, the male will guide the female over a spermatophore that he has deposited on the ground, which she will then take up with her cloaca.

The eggs are fertilised internally, and deposited individually by the female, usually folding them into leaves of aquatic plants. It takes a female takes around five minutes to deposit one egg. She usually lays around 200 eggs per season. The embryos are usually light-coloured, 1.8–2 mm in diameter with a 6 mm jelly capsule, which distinguishes them from eggs of other co-existing newt species that are smaller and darker-coloured. A genetic particularity shared with other Triturus species causes 50% of the embryos to die.

The larvae hatch after two to five weeks, depending on temperature. As with all salamanders and newts, the forelimbs develop first, followed later by the back legs. Unlike smaller newts, crested newt larvae are mostly nektonic, swimming freely in the water column. Just before they transition to land, the larvae resorb their external gills. At this stage, they can reach a size of 7 centimetres (2.8 in). Metamorphosis into terrestrial efts takes place two to four months after hatching, again depending on temperature. Survival of larvae from hatching to metamorphosis has been estimated at a mean of roughly 4%. In unfavourable conditions, larvae may delay their development and overwinter in water, although this seems to be less common than in the small-bodied newts.

Development in the northern crested newt

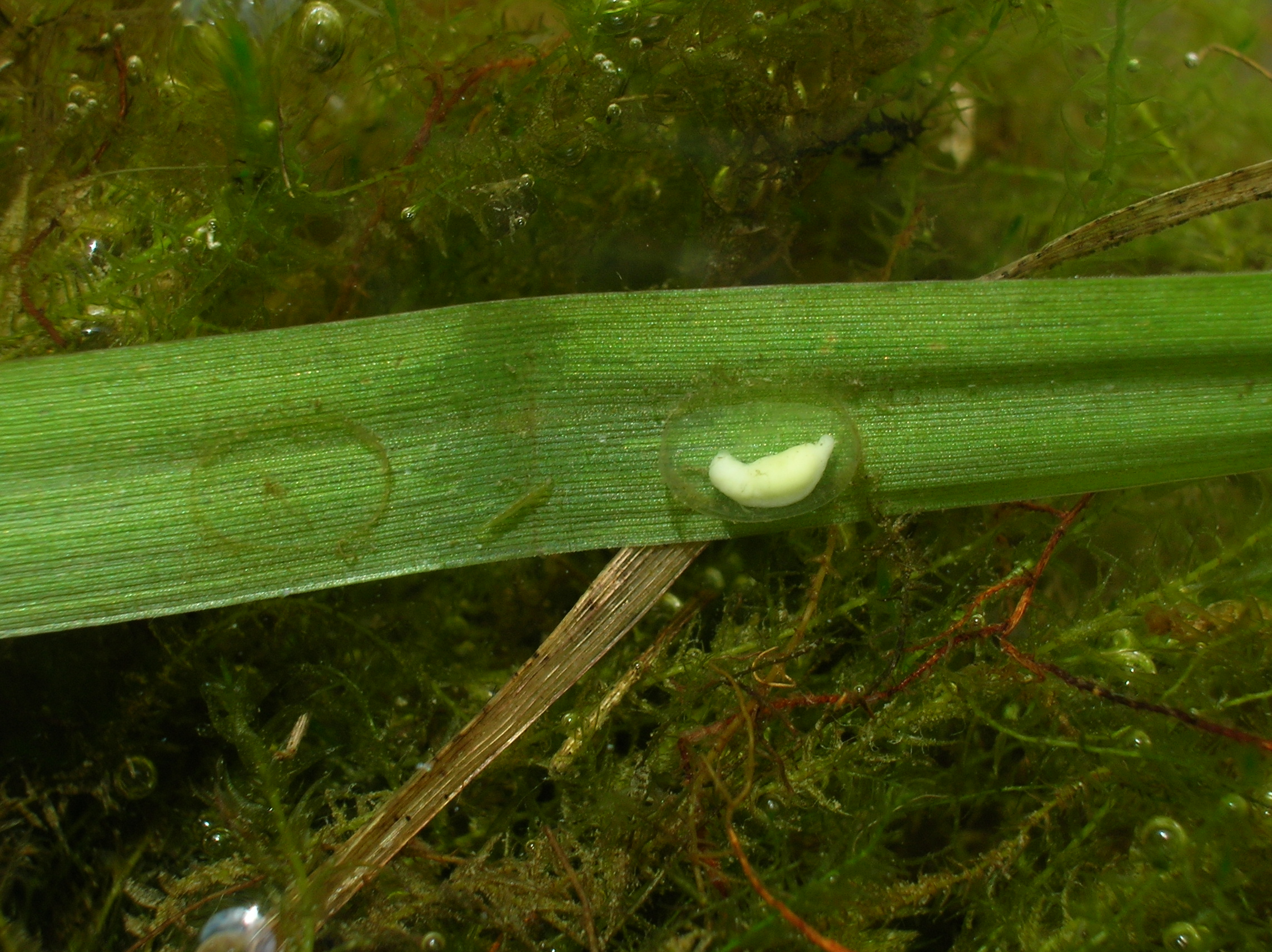
Embryo in jelly capsule

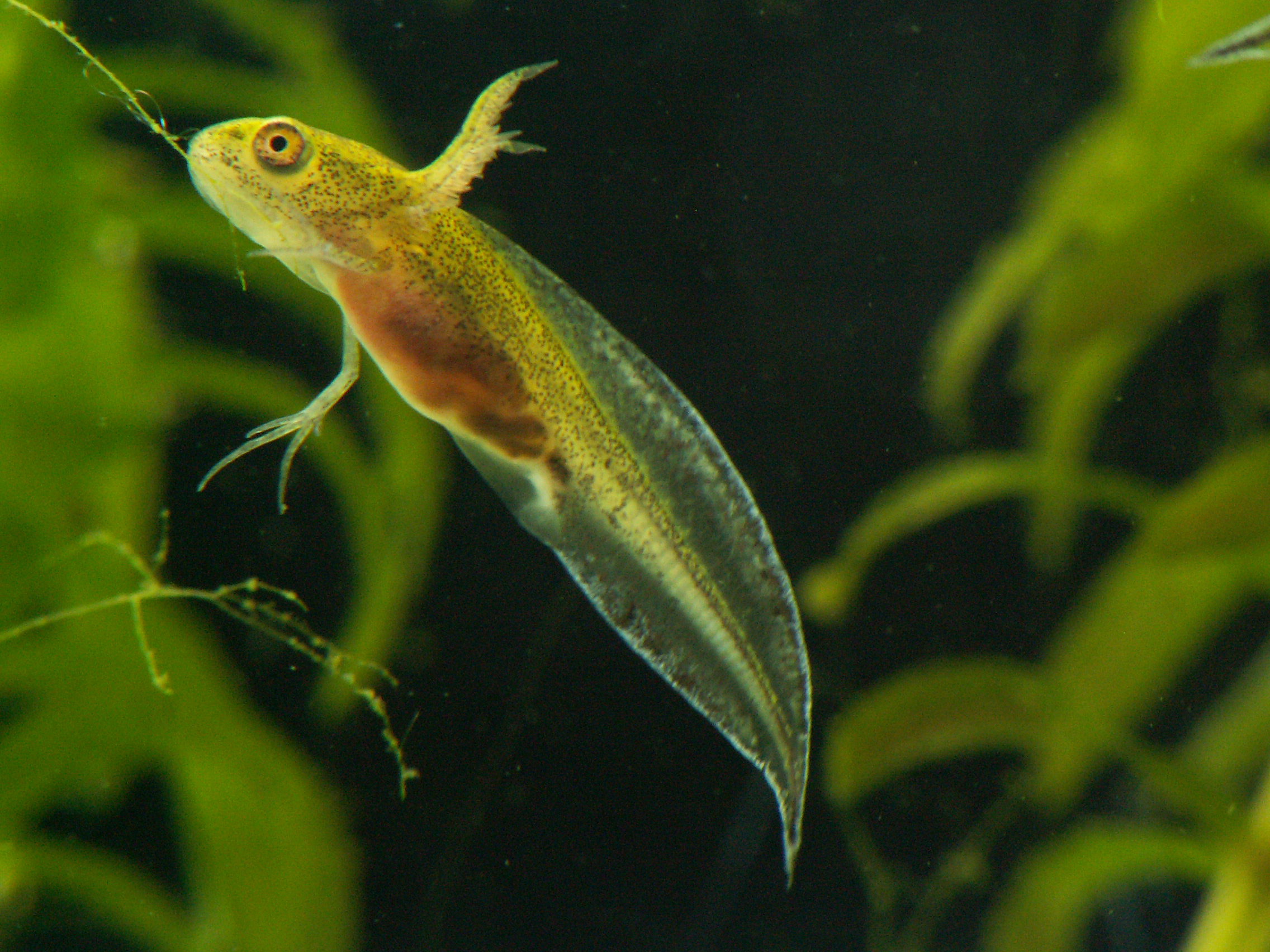
Young larva

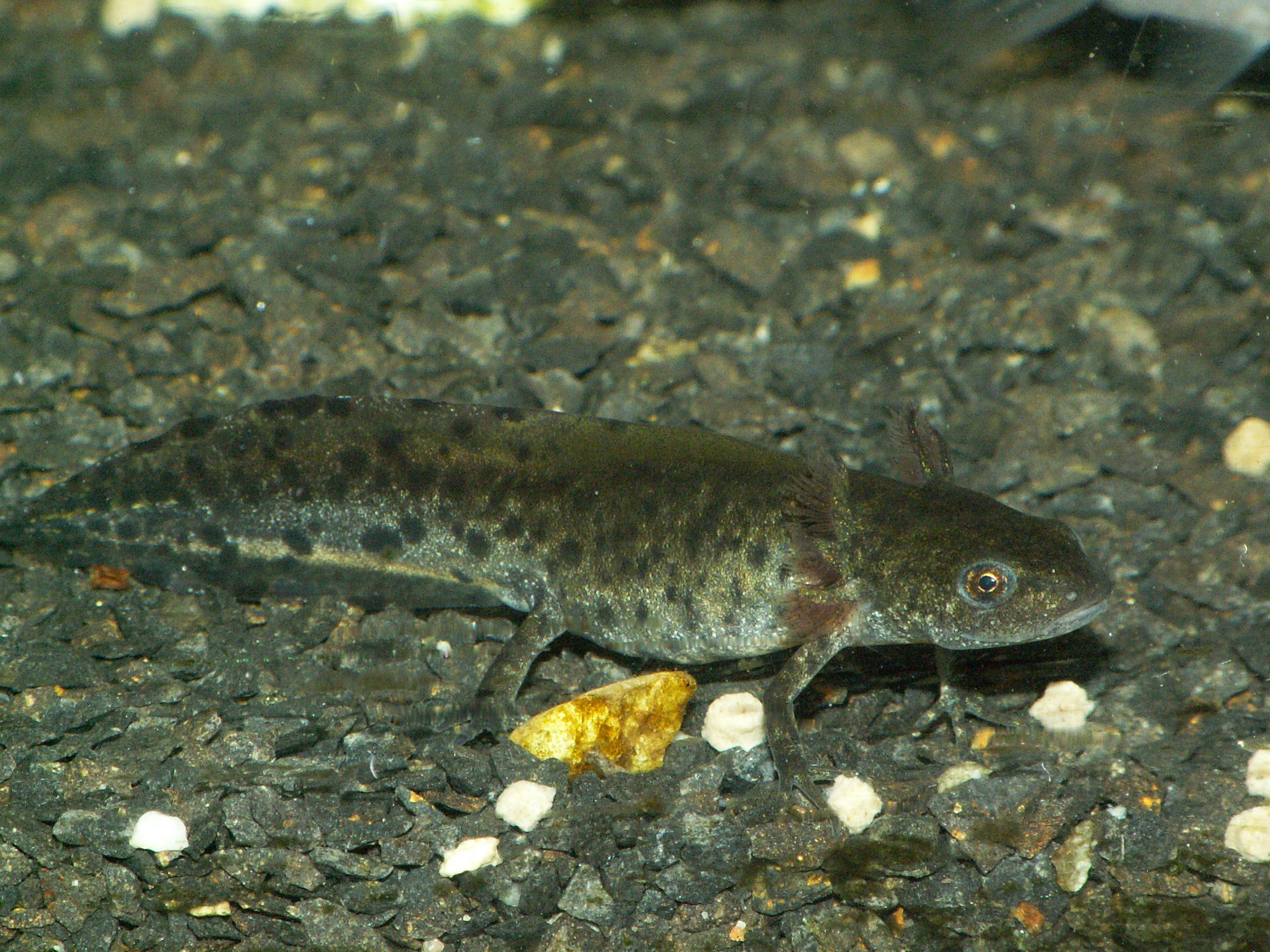
Larva shortly before metamorphosis

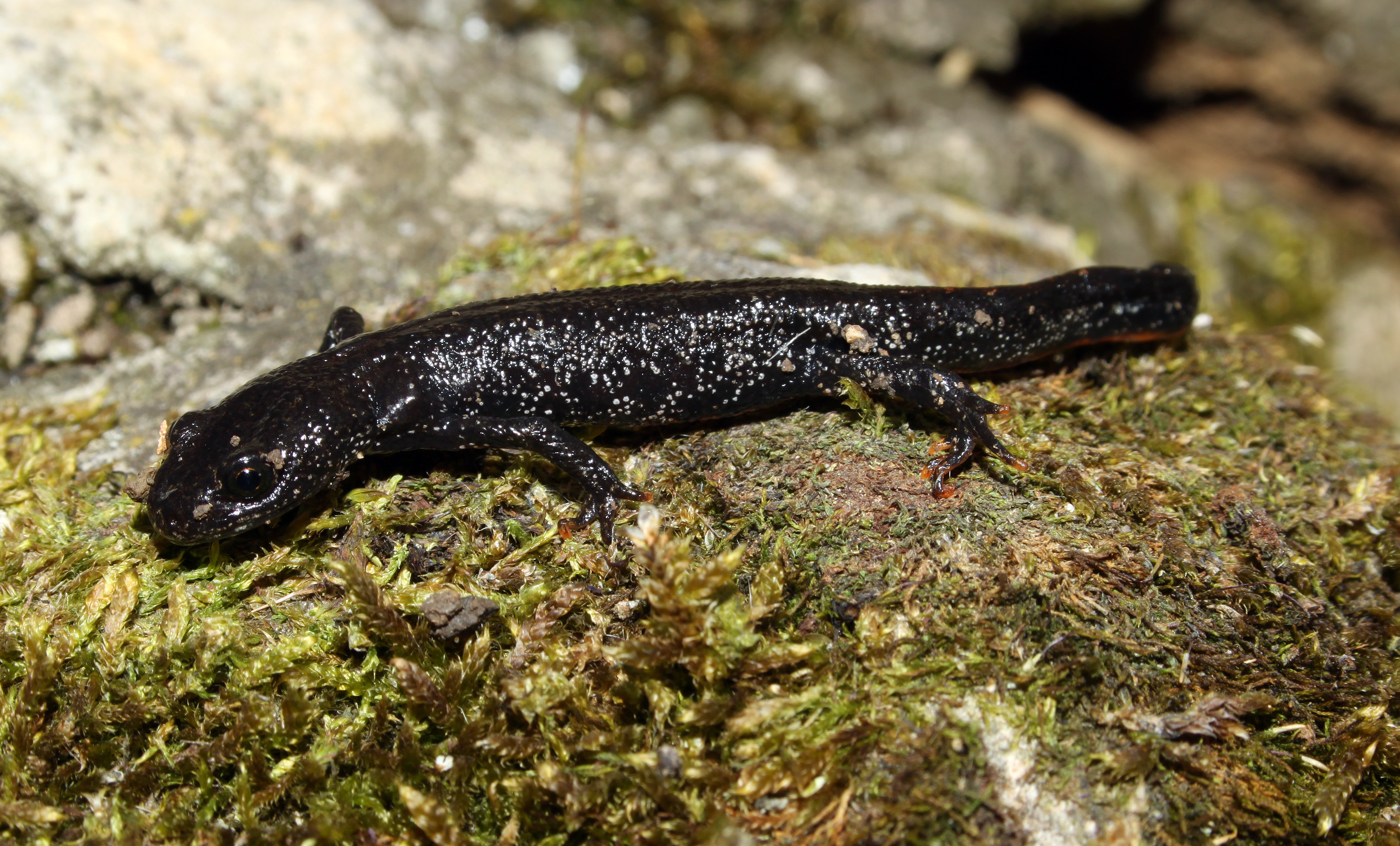
Terrestrial juvenile

Triturus species fold their eggs in leaves of aquatic plants. The larvae first develop fore- and later hindlimbs and can grow up to 7 cm. After metamorphosis, juveniles are around 3–5 cm long. In total, larval development takes between two and four months.

== Evolution ==
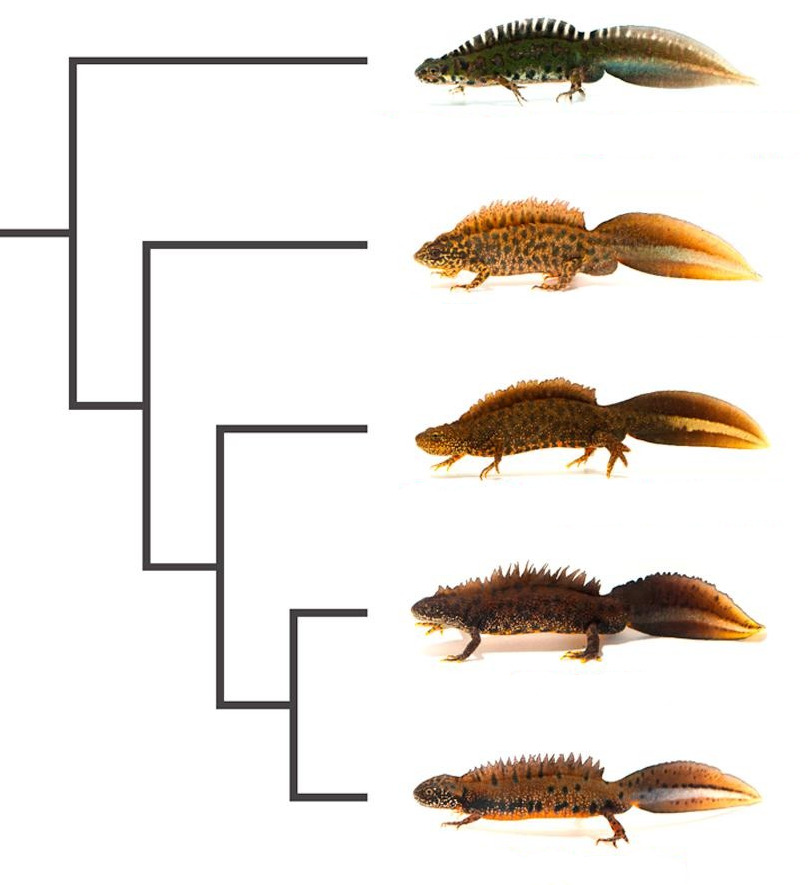
Position of the northern crested newt (T. cristatus) in the phylogenetic tree of the genus Triturus

The northern crested newt sometimes hybridises with other crested newt species where their ranges meet, but overall, the different species are reproductively isolated. In a case study in the Netherlands, genes of the introduced Italian crested newt (T. carnifex) were found to introgress into the gene pool of the native northern crested newt. The closest relative of the northern crested newt, according to molecular phylogenetic analyses, is the Danube crested newt (T. dobrogicus).

In western France, the range of the northern crested newt overlaps with that of the marbled newt (T. marmoratus), but the two species generally prefer different habitats. When they do occur in the same breeding ponds, they can form hybrids with intermediate characteristics. Hybrids resulting from a cross between a crested newt male with a marbled newt female are much rarer due to increased mortality of the larvae, and are always male. In the reverse cross, males have lower survival rates than females. Hybrids lay more eggs than the parent species, but the eggs and embryos have a lower survival rate. Overall, the viability of the hybrids is reduced and they rarely backcross with their parent species. Hybrids made up 3–7% of the adult populations in various studies.

Little genetic variation was found across most of the species' range, except in the Carpathians. This suggests that the Carpathians were a refugium during the Last Glacial Maximum. The northern crested newt then expanded its range north-, east- and westwards when the climate rewarmed.

== Threats and conservation ==
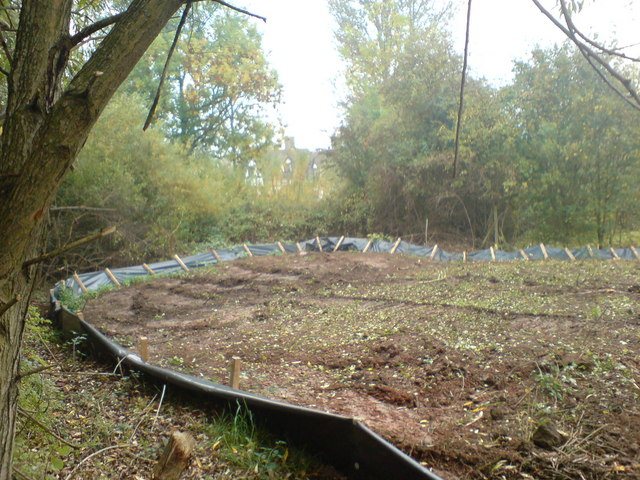
Drift fence for the capture and relocation of northern crested newts from a development site in the UK

The northern crested newt is listed as species of Least Concern on the IUCN Red List, but populations are declining. It is rare in some parts of its range and listed in several national red lists.

The main reason for this species' decline is habitat destruction through urban and agricultural development, which affects both the aquatic breeding sites as well as the land habitats. Their limited dispersal makes the newts especially vulnerable to fragmentation, i.e. the loss of connections for exchange between suitable habitats. Other threats include the introduction of fish and crayfish into breeding ponds, collection for the pet trade in its eastern range, warmer and wetter winters due to global warming, genetic pollution through hybridisation with other, introduced crested newt species, the use of road salt, and potentially the pathogenic fungus Batrachochytrium salamandrivorans.

The northern crested newt is listed in Berne Convention Appendix II as "strictly protected". It is also included in Annex II (species requiring designation of special areas of conservation) and IV (species in need of strict protection) of the EU habitats and species directive, as a European Protected Species. As required by these frameworks, its capture, disturbance, killing or trade, as well as the destruction of its habitats, are prohibited in most European countries. The EU habitats directive is also the basis for the Natura 2000 protected areas, several of which have been designated specifically to protect the northern crested newt.

Preservation of natural waterbodies, reduction of fertiliser and pesticide use, control or eradication of introduced predatory fish, and the connection of habitats through sufficiently wide corridors of uncultivated land are seen as effective conservation actions. A network of nearby aquatic habitats is important for sustaining populations, and creating new breeding ponds is generally very effective as they are rapidly colonised when other habitats are nearby. In some cases, entire populations have been relocated when threatened by development projects, but such translocations need to be carefully planned to be successful.

Strict legal protection of the northern crested newt in the United Kingdom has led to conflicts with local development projects. However, the species is also considered a flagship species, and its conservation also benefits a range of other amphibians. Government agencies have issued specific guidelines for mitigating the impacts of development.
