= European Protected Species =

European Protected Species (EPS) are species of plants and animals (other than birds) protected by law throughout the European Union. They are listed in Annexes II and IV of the European Habitats Directive.

The lists include several hundred species of plants and animals. They do not include any fungi, lichens or birds.

European Union states are required under the Habitats Directive to protect the listed species, and for some species (those listed in Annexe II), they are required to designate Special Areas of Conservation (SACs) to protect populations of them.

Birds are omitted from the Annexes because the Habitats Directive does not deal with birds – the equivalent bird species are protected separately under the earlier Birds Directive.

Many species which are not European Protected Species are nevertheless protected by individual EU states.
