= Enoch Jenkins (sports shooter) =

Welsh sports shooter (1892–1984)

Personal information
- Born: 6 November 1892 Pontyclun Wales
- Died: 4 January 1984 (aged 91)

Sport
- Sport: Sports shooting

Enoch Jenkins (6 November 1892 – 4 January 1984) was a Welsh sports shooter. He competed for Great Britain at the 1920, 1924 and 1952 Summer Olympics.

Other highlights of his career include:

- Winner of the National Rifle Association Clay-Bird Championship at Bisley and the British Open Clay Pigeon Championship at Gleneagles in 1923.

- Fourth place at the 1935 World Clay Pigeon Championships.

- Winner of the German Clay Pigeon Championships in Berlin (1936).

- Member of the Wales team that won the British Clay Pigeon Championship in 1937, where he was also the highest individual scorer.

- Recorded an extraordinary 88 consecutive hits at Bisley and, aged 55, scored 99 out of 100 in the 1948 Home Nations competition.
