= Groes-faen =

Village in Rhondda Cynon Taf, Wales

Coordinates: 51.5196°N 3.3402°W

- Location within Rhondda Cynon Taf
- OS grid reference: ST071810
- Principal area: Rhondda Cynon Taf
- Preserved county: Mid Glamorgan
- Country: Wales
- Sovereign state: United Kingdom
- Police: South Wales
- Fire: South Wales
- Ambulance: Welsh
- UK Parliament: Pontypridd

Groes-faen is a village approximately three miles south of Llantrisant in the county borough of Rhondda Cynon Taf, Wales. It is in the historic county of Glamorgan.

The village began as a hamlet in the 1860s near a trade route from Cowbridge to Cardiff.

== History ==
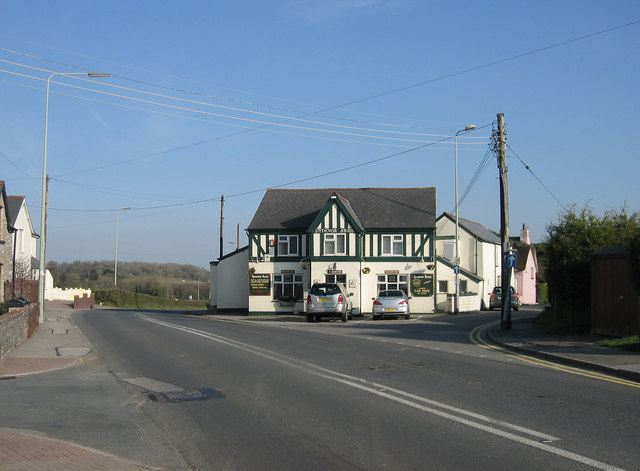
Dynevor Arms, Groes-faen

The opening of the Bute & Mwyndy iron ore works during the 1850s had a huge impact on the small hamlet of Groes Faen. The census of 1861 shows that Groes Faen had become a village. Its population was 83 people in 17 households; of these, 17 residents were iron ore miners, so the average household had 4.9 residents with one being a miner. The village centre was the Dynefor Arms pub and the cottages surrounding it.

In the 1970s, the nearby Brofiscin Quarry was used as a dump for toxic chemicals. The site was described by The Guardian in 2007 as "one of the most contaminated places in Britain". In 2007 research began to assess the potential environmental impact of seepage from the quarry.

== St Davids Church ==
Saint David’s Church, Groesfaen was consecrated in 1892 by the Bishop of Llandaff and serves as the “daughter church” of St. Catwg’s in Pentyrch.

It is suggested that the church was commissioned by local gentry, possibly to rival a church built by Judge Gwylym Rhys-Williams in Miskin. The Dunnes of Croffta and the Martens of Henstaff Court were among its key benefactors.

Originally constructed on the edge of the village, the church now lies at the centre of Groesfaen due to modern developments in Y Parc. In its early years, Sunday services were conducted exclusively in Welsh, reflecting the parish’s largely Welsh-speaking population. Today, St. David’s serves as the parish church for both Creigiau and Groesfaen.

Historically, Groesfaen was situated along the Penhrys Pilgrimage route. The churchyard contains the base of an ancient cross, believed to have been one of the route markers. Source Pontyclun website
