= WRU Division Five South West =

Welsh rugby union league

- Founded: 1995
- No. of teams: 11
- Country: Wales
- Most recent champion: Birchgrove RFC (2009–10)
- Level on pyramid: 6
- Promotion to: WRU Division Four South East, WRU Division Four South West
- Relegation to: WRU Division Six Central
- Website: web.archive.org/web/20080616144331/http://www.wru.co.uk/1160_2104.php

The Welsh Rugby Union Division Five South West (also called the SWALEC Division Five South West for sponsorship reasons) is a rugby union league in Wales first implemented for the 1995/96 season.

== Competition format and sponsorship ==
=== Competition ===
There are 11 clubs in the WRU Division Five South West. During the course of a season (which lasts from September to May) each club plays the others twice, once at their home ground and once at that of their opponents for a total of 20 games for each club, with a total of 110 games in each season. Teams receive four points for a win and two point for a draw, an additional bonus point is awarded to either team if they score four tries or more in a single match. No points are awarded for a loss though the losing team can gain a bonus point for finishing the match within seven points of the winning team. Teams are ranked by total points, then the number of tries scored and then points difference. At the end of each season, the club with the most points is crowned as champion. If points are equal the tries scored then points difference determines the winner. The team who is declared champion at the end of the season is eligible for promotion to the WRU Division Four South. The two lowest placed teams are relegated into the WRU Division Six Central.

=== Sponsorship ===
In 2008 the Welsh Rugby Union announced a new sponsorship deal for the club rugby leagues with SWALEC valued at £1 million (GBP). The initial three year sponsorship was extended at the end of the 2010/11 season, making SWALEC the league sponsors until 2015. The leagues sponsored are the WRU Divisions one through to seven.

- (2002-2005) Lloyds TSB
- (2005-2008) Asda
- (2008-2015) SWALEC

== 2010/2011 Season ==
=== League teams ===
- Alltwen RFC
- Baglan RFC
- Crynant RFC
- Cwmgors RFC
- Cwmtwrch RFC
- Glais RFC
- Gowerton RFC
- Neath Athletic RFC
- New Dock Stars RFC
- Penlan RFC
- Trebanos RFC
- Tycroes RFC

== 2009/2010 Season ==
=== League teams ===
- Alltwen RFC
- Birchgrove RFC
- Crynant RFC
- Cwmgors RFC
- Cwmtwrch RFC
- Glais RFC
- Gowerton RFC
- Llandybie RFC
- Neath Athletic RFC
- Penlan RFC
- Tycroes RFC
- Trebanos RFC

=== League table ===
2009-2010 WRU Division Five South West League Table
Club	Played	Won	Drawn	Lost	Points for	Points against	Tries for	Tries against	Try bonus	Losing bonus	Points
Birchgrove RFC	20	17	0	3	538	257	82	29	13	2	83
Neath Athletic RFC	20	17	0	3	616	194	89	24	12	2	82
Trebanos RFC	20	17	0	3	701	223	99	27	13	0	81
Gowerton RFC	20	11	0	9	439	389	55	52	5	5	54
Llandybie RFC	20	11	0	9	338	374	38	55	4	3	51
Alltwen RFC	20	9	1	10	445	382	50	42	5	4	47
Crynant RFC	20	8	0	12	315	454	43	66	4	3	39
Glais RFC	20	6	1	13	233	444	33	64	0	1	27
Tycroes RFC	20	5	0	15	250	617	32	88	3	3	26
Cwmtwrch RFC	20	4	2	14	179	466	25	66	1	1	22
Cwmgors RFC	20	3	0	17	206	460	31	64	3	6	21
Penlan RFC	0	0	0	0	0	0	0	0	0	0	0
Correct as of 4 August 2010

== 2008/2009 Season ==
=== League teams ===
- Abercrave RFC
- Alltwen RFC
- Cwmtwrch RFC
- Glais RFC
- Gowerton RFC
- Llandybie RFC
- New Dock Stars RFC
- Penygroes RFC
- Pontardawe RFC
- Swansea Uplands RFC
- Trebanos RFC

== 2007/2008 Season ==
=== League teams ===
- Alltwen RFC
- Betws RFC
- Bynea RFC
- Cwmtwrch RFC
- Glais RFC
- Gowerton RFC
- New Dock Stars RFC
- Pontardawe RFC
- Swansea Uplands RFC
- Trebanos RFC
- Ystradgynlais RFC

=== League table ===
2007-2008 WRU Division Five South West League Table
Club	Played	Won	Drawn	Lost	Points for	Points against	Tries for	Tries against	Try bonus	Losing bonus	Points
Betws RFC	20	18	0	2	727	243	111	29	14	2	88
Ystradgynlais RFC	20	18	0	2	667	200	107	24	15	1	88
Alltwen RFC	20	15	1	4	434	237	55	21	7	1	70
New Dock Stars RFC	20	11	1	8	367	318	51	38	5	4	55
Pontardawe RFC	20	10	0	10	441	381	64	51	9	4	53
Trebanos RFC	20	10	1	9	441	404	51	58	5	4	51
Glais RFC	20	9	0	11	293	325	36	42	4	5	45
Gowerton RFC	20	7	0	13	313	468	38	69	2	4	34
Cwmtwrch RFC	20	5	2	13	261	406	28	58	0	4	28
Swansea Uplands RFC	20	2	1	17	197	574	28	89	1	2	13
Bynea RFC	20	2	0	18	139	724	21	111	1	1	10
Correct as of 18:13 29 May 2008
