= WRU Division Four South West =

Welsh rugby union league

- Founded: 1995
- No. of teams: 12
- Country: Wales
- Most recent champion: Maesteg Celtic RFC (2011–12)
- Level on pyramid: 5
- Promotion to: WRU Division Three South West
- Relegation to: WRU Division Five South West
- Website: www.wru.co.uk/eng/club/swalecleagues/latest_news.php

The Welsh Rugby Union Division Four South West (also called the SWALEC Division Four South West for sponsorship reasons) is a rugby union league in Wales first implemented for the 1995/96 season.

== Competition format and sponsorship ==
=== Competition ===
There are 12 clubs in the WRU Division Four South West. During the course of a season (which lasts from September to April) each club plays the others twice, once at their home ground and once at that of their opponents for a total of 22 games for each club, with a total of 132 games in each season. Teams receive four points for a win and two point for a draw, an additional bonus point is awarded to either team if they score four tries or more in a single match. No points are awarded for a loss though the losing team can gain a bonus point for finishing the match within seven points of the winning team. Teams are ranked by total points, then the number of tries scored and then points difference. At the end of each season, the club with the most points is crowned as champion. If points are equal the tries scored then points difference determines the winner. The team who is declared champion at the end of the season is eligible for promotion to the WRU Division Three South West. The two lowest placed teams are relegated into the WRU Division Five South West.

=== Sponsorship ===
In 2008 the Welsh Rugby Union announced a new sponsorship deal for the club rugby leagues with SWALEC valued at £1 million (GBP). The initial three year sponsorship was extended at the end of the 2010/11 season, making SWALEC the league sponsors until 2015. The leagues sponsored are the WRU Divisions one through to seven.

- (2002-2005) Lloyds TSB
- (2005-2008) Asda
- (2008-2015) SWALEC

== 2011/2012 season ==
=== League teams ===
- Abercrave RFC
- Birchgrove RFC
- Briton Ferry RFC
- Cwmavon RFC
- Glyncorrwg RFC
- Maesteg Celtic RFC
- Nantyffyllon RFC
- Neath Athletic RFC
- Pontardawe RFC
- Pyle RFC
- Resolven RFC
- Trebanos RFC

=== 2011/2012 table ===
2011-12 WRU Division Four South West League Table
	Club	Played	Won	Drawn	Lost	Points for	Points against	Tries for	Tries against	Try bonus	Losing bonus	Points
1	Maesteg Celtic RFC	22	20	0	2	571	232	81	26	10	1	91
2	Resolven RFC	22	16	0	6	589	330	86	31	10	6	80
3	Trebanos RFC	22	16	1	5	630	281	81	34	10	3	79
4	Neath Athletic RFC	22	14	2	6	655	342	98	48	9	4	73
5	Cwmavon RFC	22	13	1	8	595	357	75	48	7	2	63
6	Pyle RFC	22	11	1	10	522	455	73	60	7	6	59
7	Glyncorrwg RFC	22	10	1	11	425	352	55	45	6	5	53
8	Nantyffyllon RFC	22	10	1	11	339	361	43	45	5	3	50
9	Birchgrove RFC	22	6	0	16	296	676	37	94	1	4	29
10	Briton Ferry RFC	22	5	2	15	291	599	37	85	2	2	28
11	Pontardawe RFC	22	3	0	19	332	664	35	89	2	7	21
12	Abercrave RFC	22	3	1	18	217	813	27	123	1	3	18
Correct as of 3 June 2012

== 2010/2011 season ==
=== League teams ===
- Abercrave RFC
- Birchgrove RFC
- Bridgend Sports RFC
- Briton Ferry RFC
- Glyncorrwg RFC
- Maesteg Celtic RFC
- Maesteg Harlequins RFC
- Pontardawe RFC
- Porthcawl RFC
- Pyle RFC
- Vardre RFC
- Ystradgynlais RFC

=== 2010/2011 table ===
2010-11 WRU Division Four South West League Table
	Club	Played	Won	Drawn	Lost	Points for	Points against	Tries for	Tries against	Try bonus	Losing bonus	Points
1	Maesteg Harlequins RFC	22	22	0	0	741	282	94	33	14	0	102
2	Vardre RFC	22	17	1	4	731	356	95	49	11	1	82
3	Maesteg Celtic RFC	22	13	1	8	417	393	53	50	5	3	62
4	Pontardawe RFC	22	12	0	10	508	426	64	52	9	3	60
5	Briton Ferry RFC	22	11	0	11	453	486	62	61	8	4	56
6	Glyncorrwg RFC	22	10	2	10	435	404	60	50	8	3	55
7	Bridgend Sports RFC	22	10	0	12	405	536	62	71	9	4	53
8	Birchgrove RFC	22	10	0	12	476	501	64	62	7	4	51
9	Abercrave RFC	22	8	0	14	457	442	55	62	5	9	46
10	Pyle RFC	22	7	0	15	391	451	55	59	2	7	37
11	Porthcawl RFC	22	7	2	13	336	634	40	91	4	0	36
12	Ystradgynlais RFC	22	1	2	19	274	713	35	99	1	6	15
Correct as of 3 June 2012

== 2009/2010 season ==
=== League teams ===
- Aberavon Green Stars RFC
- Abercrave RFC
- Glyncorrwg RFC
- Maesteg Celtic RFC
- Pontardawe RFC
- Porthcawl RFC
- Pyle RFC
- Resolven RFC
- Taibach RFC
- Tonna RFC
- Vardre RFC
- Ystradgynlais RFC

=== 2009/2010 Table ===
2009-2010 WRU Division Four South West League Table
Club	Played	Won	Drawn	Lost	Points for	Points against	Tries for	Tries against	Try bonus	Losing bonus	Points
Aberavon Green Stars RFC	22	20	0	2	760	252	115	31	16	0	96
Taibach RFC	22	17	0	5	585	339	70	49	10	1	79
Vardre RFC	22	14	0	8	536	337	66	43	8	6	70
Pyle RFC	22	14	0	8	469	339	69	43	8	2	66
Pontardawe RFC	22	14	0	8	521	439	64	56	5	3	64
Glyncorrwg RFC	22	13	0	9	446	396	64	43	8	3	63
Abercrave RFC	22	9	0	13	445	451	58	56	6	7	49
Ystradgynlais RFC	22	8	0	14	357	506	46	67	6	6	44
Maesteg Celtic RFC	22	8	1	13	389	524	47	66	3	4	41
Porthcawl RFC	22	7	2	13	342	638	38	90	3	3	38
Tonna RFC	22	3	1	18	340	645	40	92	3	5	22
Resolven RFC	22	3	0	19	254	578	34	75	2	6	20
Correct as of 08:50 2 August 2010

== 2008/2009 season ==
=== League teams ===
- Aberavon Green Stars RFC
- Birchgrove RFC
- Bryncoch RFC
- Glyncorrwg RFC
- Neath Athletic RFC
- Porthcawl RFC
- Pontycymmer RFC
- Resolven RFC
- Taibach RFC
- Vardre RFC
- Ystalyfera RFC
- Ystradgynlais RFC

=== 2008/2009 Table ===
2008-2009 WRU Division Four South West League Table
Club	Played	Won	Drawn	Lost	Points for	Points against	Tries for	Tries against	Try bonus	Losing bonus	Points
Bryncoch RFC	22	21	0	1	743	403	106	58	13	0	93 ^{1}
Ystalyfera RFC	22	15	0	7	563	379	67	47	5	4	69
Taibach RFC	22	14	1	7	514	340	75	42	8	2	68
Glyncorrwg RFC	22	13	1	8	468	311	61	38	5	6	65
Resolven RFC	22	12	0	10	460	439	61	62	7	6	61
Pontycymmer RFC	22	10	0	12	384	405	52	49	5	5	50
Aberavon Green Stars RFC	22	10	0	12	342	598	49	85	5	3	48
Ystradgynlais RFC	22	9	0	13	366	451	44	59	4	3	43
Porthcawl RFC	22	7	1	14	490	517	64	72	6	6	42
Vardre RFC	22	8	1	13	343	381	44	46	1	6	41
Neath Athletic RFC	22	7	0	15	352	521	48	75	5	8	41
Birchgrove RFC	22	4	0	18	286	566	38	76	1	4	21
Correct as of 08:50 10 May 2009

^{1} Brynoch RFC were penalised with a 4-point deduction for not contesting scrums during a game with Glyncorrwg.

== 2007/2008 season ==
=== League teams ===
- Abercrave RFC
- Brynamman RFC
- Bryncoch RFC
- Glyncorrwg RFC
- Glynneath RFC
- Hirwaun RFC
- Maesteg Celtic RFC
- Neath Athletic RFC
- Pontycymmer RFC
- Resolven RFC
- Taibach RFC
- Ystalyfera RFC

=== 2007/2008 Table ===
2007-2008 WRU Division Four South West League Table
Club	Played	Won	Drawn	Lost	Points for	Points against	Tries for	Tries against	Try bonus	Losing bonus	Points
Glynneath RFC	22	18	0	4	541	246	69	27	10	2	84
Maesteg Celtic RFC	22	17	1	4	428	243	54	29	7	1	78
Taibach RFC	22	16	0	6	502	352	67	47	7	1	72
Bryncoch RFC	22	16	1	5	415	348	57	47	5	1	72
Brynamman RFC	22	11	0	11	477	355	59	44	6	6	56
Ystalyfera RFC	22	10	1	11	365	374	46	48	4	6	52
Glyncorrwg RFC	22	10	0	12	364	319	44	43	4	8	52
Pontycymmer RFC	22	9	1	12	291	404	40	50	1	3	42
Neath Athletic RFC	22	7	0	15	311	449	35	65	2	6	36
Resolven RFC	22	6	1	15	369	509	53	67	3	6	35
Abercrave RFC	22	5	1	16	260	543	33	75	0	2	24
Hirwaun RFC	22	4	0	18	290	471	41	56	2	6	24
Correct as of 00:00 1 August 2007

== 2006/2007 season ==
- Abercrave RFC
- Alltwen RFC
- Birchgrove RFC
- BP RFC
- Briton Ferry RFC
- Glynneath RFC
- Llantwit Major RFC
- Newport Saracens RFC
- Pontycymmer RFC
- Resolven RFC
- Trebanos RFC
- Ystalyfera RFC
