= Frederick Morgan =

Frederick, Frederic, Fred, or Freddy Morgan may refer to:

== Arts and entertainment ==
- Frederick Morgan (painter) (1847–1927), English painter
- Fred Morgan (actor) (1878–1941), British silent film actor
- Frederick Cleveland Morgan (1881–1962), Canadian art curator
- Fred Morgan (recorder maker) (1940–1999), Australian recorder maker

== Law and politics ==
- Frederick Courtenay Morgan (1834–1909), British politician
- Frederic A. Morgan (1846–1925), American politician in Wisconsin
- Fred Morgan (politician) (born 1954), American politician in Oklahoma

== Sports ==
- Fred Morgan (footballer) (1892–1971), Australian rules footballer
- Fred Morgan (sport shooter) (1893–1980), South African sport shooter
- Freddy Morgan (1908–1990), Welsh boxer
- Fred Morgan (rugby union) (1915–1988), Welsh international rugby union player

== Others ==
- Frederick Augustus Morgan (1837–1894), Australian mining investor
- Frederic Morgan, 5th Baron Tredegar (1873–1954), Welsh peer and landowner
- Frederic L. Morgan (1889–1970), American architect
- Frederick Morgan (British Army officer, born 1894) (1894–1967), British Army general

== See also ==
- George Frederick Morgan (1922–2004), American poet
