= Eddie Morgan (rugby union) =

GB & Wales international rugby union player

- Born: Morgan Edward Morgan; 18 December 1913 Pontardawe, Wales
- Died: 16 April 1978 (aged 64) Abercrave, Wales
- School: Abercrave School

Rugby union career
- Position: Forward
Amateur team(s)
Years	Team	Apps	(Points)
- Abercrave RFC
–	Swansea RFC		
–	Barbarian F.C.		
International career
Years	Team	Apps	(Points)
1938–1939	Wales	4	(0)
1938	British Isles	2	(0)

Morgan Edward Morgan (18 December 1913 – 16 April 1978) was a Welsh international prop who played club rugby for Swansea and international rugby for both Wales and the British Lions.

== Rugby playing career ==
Morgan first played rugby for local club, Abercrave RFC, but by 1937 he had moved to first class team Swansea. While with Swansea, Morgan gained his first international cap for Wales when he was selected to face England as part of the 1938 Home Nations Championship. The previous tournament had been a terrible campaign for Wales, losing all three matches. The selectors reacted by bringing in four new caps into the pack, while retaining confidence in veteran backs. Morgan was brought in with Walter Vickery, Allan McCarley and Fred Morgan, which saw the pack transform the Welsh play, resulting in the first Welsh win over England in five years. Morgan was reselected for the rest of the tournament, which saw Wales losing narrowly away to Scotland, and a win over Ireland.

Morgan was later selected for the British Lions for their 1938 tour of South Africa, playing in 14 matches and gaining two caps in the first two tests. On his return he gained one final Welsh cap when he played against England in the opening game of the 1939 Home Nations Championship. Wales lost the game by a single try and Morgan did not represent Wales again.

=== International matches played ===
Wales

- England 1938, 1939
- Ireland 1938
- Scotland 1938

== Bibliography ==
- Godwin, Terry (1984). The International Rugby Championship 1883–1983. London: Willows Books. ISBN 0-00-218060-X.
- Smith, David; Williams, Gareth (1980). Fields of Praise: The Official History of The Welsh Rugby Union. Cardiff: University of Wales Press. ISBN 0-7083-0766-3.

Rugby Union Captain
Preceded by Ernie Harris	Swansea RFC Captain; 1939-1940	Succeeded by World War II
