= List of urban areas in the United Kingdom =

This is a list of the most populous urban areas in the United Kingdom based on the 2011 census, as defined by the Office for National Statistics (ONS). As of June 2026, the ONS has not published the equivalent data based on the 2021 census.

== Definition ==
=== 2001 ===
In reporting the 2001 census, the ONS gave a clearer definition of the term "built-up" for the 2001 urban area as follows:

This comprises permanent structures and the land on which they are situated, including land enclosed by or closely associated with such structures; transportation corridors such as roads, railways and canals which have built up land on one or both sides, or which link built-up sites which are less than 200 metres apart; transportation features such as airports and operational airfields, railway yards, motorway service areas and car parks; mine buildings, excluding mineral workings and quarries; and any area completely surrounded by builtup sites. Areas such as playing fields and golf courses are excluded unless completely surrounded by builtup sites...

=== 2011 ===
The methodology used by ONS in 2011 is set out in 2011 Built-up Areas – Methodology and Guidance, published in June 2013. When ONS reported the results of the 2011 UK census, it used the term built-up area rather than the term urban area as used in previous censuses. ONS states, however, that the criteria used to define built-up area have not changed:

the definition follows a ‘bricks and mortar’ approach, with areas defined as built-up land with a minimum area of 20 hectares (200,000 m^{2}), while settlements within 200 metres of each other are linked. Built-up area sub-divisions are also identified to provide greater detail in the data, especially in the larger conurbations.

=== 2021 ===
As of May 2026, ONS has not defined a new nomenclature for each of the macro-scaled 2021 areas.

== Most populous ==
The list below shows the most populated urban areas in the United Kingdom as defined by the Office for National Statistics (ONS). The list includes all urban areas with a population in excess of 100,000 at the 2011 census.

#	Area (Note: The built-up area names are taken from the 2011 census. Some articles use other names or link to the most appropriate article.)	Population (2011)	Area (km^{2}) (Note: ONS definition. Excludes motorways, rivers, lakes, parks and other open space, even if fully contained but wider than 200m.)	Density (People/ km^{2})	Primary subdivisions (Note: ONS definition.)	Notable changes from 2001 to 2011 (Note: The areas and sub-divisions can be renamed, merged, split or removed between censuses.)
1	Greater London	9,787,426	1,737.9	5,630	London boroughs, Hemel Hempstead, Watford, Woking, Harlow, St Albans, Bracknell	Guildford, Harlow, Bracknell and St Albans added.
2	Greater Manchester	2,553,379	630.3	4,051	Manchester, Salford, Bolton, Stockport, Oldham, Rochdale, Bury, Atherton, Leigh, Trafford, Tameside	Golborne, Glossop and Newton-le-Willows added.
3	West Midlands	2,440,986	598.9	4,076	Birmingham, Wolverhampton, West Bromwich, Dudley, Walsall, Solihull	
4	West Yorkshire	1,777,934	487.8	3,645	Leeds, Bradford, Wakefield, Huddersfield, Dewsbury, Keighley, Halifax	Halifax added
5	Greater Glasgow	957,620	368.5	3,390	Glasgow, Paisley, Clydebank, Rutherglen, Newton Mearns, Bearsden, Cambuslang, Clarkston, Bishopbriggs	
6	Liverpool	864,122	199.6	4,329	Liverpool, Bootle, Litherland, Crosby, Prescot, St. Helens, Ashton-in-Makerfield	Ashton-in-Makerfield added
7	South Hampshire	855,569	192.0	4,455	Portsmouth, Southampton, Eastleigh, Gosport, Fareham, Havant	Portsmouth Urban Area and Southampton Urban Area combined. Hedge End, Locks Heath, Bursledon and Whiteley added. Stubbington and Lee-on-the-Solent removed.
8	Tyneside	774,891	180.5	4,292	Newcastle upon Tyne, Gateshead, North Tyneside, South Tyneside	Washington, Chester-le-Street, Hetton-le-Hole, Houghton-le-Spring removed.
9	Nottingham	729,977	176.4	4,139	Nottingham, Beeston, Carlton, West Bridgford, Ilkeston, Hucknall	
10	Sheffield	685,368	167.5	4,092	Sheffield, Rotherham, Rawmarsh	
11	Bristol	617,280	144.4	4,274	Bristol, Filton, Pill, Frampton Cotterell, Kingswood, Warmley, Mangotsfield, Winterbourne	
12	Belfast	595,879	96.0	6,207	Belfast, Castlereagh, Greenisland, Holywood, Lisburn, Newtownabbey	
13	Leicester	508,916	109.4	4,653	Leicester, Wigston, Oadby, Syston, Blaby, Birstall, Narborough, Enderby	Ratby removed and Narborough and Enderby added
14	Edinburgh	482,270	125	4,172	Edinburgh, Musselburgh, Wallyford	
15	Brighton and Hove	474,485	89.4	5,304	Brighton and Hove, Worthing, Littlehampton, Shoreham-by-Sea	Rottingdean, Saltdean and Findon removed.
16	Bournemouth/ Poole	466,266	131.0	3,559	Bournemouth, Poole, Christchurch, Ferndown, New Milton, Wimborne Minster	Ferndown and Wimborne Minster added.
17	Cardiff	447,287	102.3	4,370	Cardiff, Caerphilly, Penarth, Pontypridd	Caerphilly and Pontypridd added.
18	Teesside	376,633	108.2	3,482	Middlesbrough, Stockton-on-Tees, Billingham, Redcar	Eston & Southbank added to Middlesbrough sub-division, no longer counted as separate sub-division
19	Stoke-on-Trent	372,775	103.9	3,588	Stoke-on-Trent, Newcastle-under-Lyme, Kidsgrove	
20	Coventry	359,262	81.3	4,420	Coventry, Bedworth	
21	Sunderland	335,415	137.5	4,018	Sunderland, Washington, Chester-le-Street, Hetton-le-Hole, Houghton-le-Spring	Washington, Chester-le-Street, Hetton-le-Hole and Houghton-le-Spring added.
22	Birkenhead	325,264	88.2	3,687	Birkenhead, Wallasey, Ellesmere Port, Bebington	
23	Reading	318,014	83.7	3,800	Reading, Wokingham, Woodley, Crowthorne	Bracknell removed.
24	Kingston upon Hull	314,018	82.6	3,802	Kingston upon Hull, Cottingham, Hessle	
25	Preston	313,322	82.4	3,802	Preston, Bamber Bridge, Chorley, Fulwood, Leyland	Longton and Adlington added.
26	Newport	306,844	84.2	3,643	Newport, Pontypool, Cwmbran, Blackwood, Risca, Ystrad Mynach	Pontypool, Cwmbran and Blackwood added.
27	Swansea	300,352	87.6	3,431	Swansea, Neath, Port Talbot, Ystradgynlais, Pontardawe	Ystradgynlais added.
28	Southend-on-Sea	295,310	71.8	4,111	Southend-on-Sea, Hullbridge, Rayleigh, Rochford	Hullbridge added.
29	Derby	270,468	64.1	4,219	Derby, Borrowash, Duffield	
30	Plymouth	260,203	59.7	4,356	Plymouth	
31	Luton	258,018	50.7	5,088	Luton, Dunstable, Houghton Regis	
32	Farnborough/ Aldershot	252,397	78.5	3,217	Farnborough, Aldershot, Camberley, Farnham, Frimley, Sandhurst, Yateley	
33	Medway Towns	243,931	52.2	4,677	Gillingham, Chatham, Rochester	
34	Blackpool	239,409	61.3	3,908	Blackpool, Lytham St Annes, Poulton-le-Fylde, Thornton, Cleveleys	Fleetwood removed.
35	Milton Keynes	229,941	62.5	3,678	"Milton Keynes", (Note: The BUASD that the ONS calls "Milton Keynes" is just that part of Milton Keynes after subtraction of Bletchley, which has been part of its designated area since 1967 and which has expanded since then as part of the overall development.) Bletchley, Newport Pagnell, Woburn Sands	Woburn Sands added.
36	Barnsley/ Dearne Valley	223,281	59.7	3,739	Barnsley, Wath upon Dearne, Wombwell, Hoyland	
37	Northampton	215,963	57.9	3,731	Northampton, Collingtree	
38	Norwich	213,166	61.9	3,444	Norwich, Taverham, Costessey, Cringleford, Colney, Horsham St Faith, Queens Hills, Thorpe End, Trowse with Newton	
39	Aberdeen	208,190	69.5	3,050	Aberdeen	
40	Swindon	185,609	47.1	3,945	Swindon, Haydon Wick, Stratton St. Margaret, Broad Blunsdon, Blunsdon St Andrew, Wroughton	
41	Crawley	180,508	58.1	3,107	Crawley, Horley, East Grinstead, Copthorne, Crawley Down	East Grinstead, Copthorne and Crawley Down added. Reigate and Redhill removed.
42	Ipswich	178,835	49.1	3,639	Ipswich, Kesgrave, Woodbridge	Woodbridge added
43	Wigan	175,405	43.8	4,009	Wigan, Skelmersdale, Standish, Ince-in-Makerfield	
44	Mansfield	171,958	48.4	3,556	Mansfield, Sutton-in-Ashfield, Kirkby-in-Ashfield, Mansfield Woodhouse	
45	Oxford	171,380	37.4	4,585	Oxford, Kennington, Wheatley	Kennington and Wheatley added
46	Warrington	165,456	44.9	3,686	Warrington	
47	Slough	163,777	34.1	4,797	Slough, Stoke Poges, Poyle	
48	Peterborough	163,379	44.2	3,693	Peterborough, Farcet	
49	Cambridge	158,434	42.1	3,760	Cambridge, Fen Ditton, Girton, Histon	Histon and Fen Ditton added.
50	Doncaster	158,141	43.5	3,634	Doncaster, Bentley, Armthorpe, Sprotbrough	Bessacarr added.
51	Dundee	157,550	49.9	3,180	Dundee, Monifieth, Invergowrie	
52	York	153,717	34.0	4,518	York, Earswick	
53	Gloucester	150,053	40.4	3,718	Gloucester, Innsworth	
54	Burnley	149,422	35.7	4,183	Burnley, Padiham, Brierfield, Colne, Barrowford, Nelson	
55	Telford	147,980	47.7	3,103	Telford, Broseley	
56	Blackburn	146,521	35.6	4,115	Blackburn, Darwen	
57	Basildon	144,859	37.1	3,902	Basildon, Wickford, Ramsden Heath, North Benfleet	Wickford added.
58	Grimsby	134,160	35.3	3,804	Grimsby, Cleethorpes, Waltham	New Waltham removed.
59	Hastings	133,422	33.2	4,019	Hastings, Bexhill	
60	High Wycombe	133,204	39.2	3,398	High Wycombe, Cookham, Hughenden Valley	
61	Thanet	125,370	27.9	4,495	Margate, Ramsgate, Broadstairs	
62	Accrington/ Rossendale	125,059	30.0	4,168	Accrington, Rawtenstall, Bacup, Great Harwood, Haslingden, Oswaldtwistle, Church	Accrington and Rossendale areas combined.
63	Motherwell	124,540	45.1	2,765	Motherwell, Wishaw, Bellshill, Viewpark, Newmains, Holytown	
64	Burton-upon-Trent	122,199	35.0	3,487	Burton-upon-Trent, Swadlincote	Swadlincote, Stapenhill and Winshill added. (Note: Stapenhill and Winshill were treated as a separate urban area in the 2001 census but in the 2011 census they were treated as part of the Burton-upon-Trent subdivision.)
65	Colchester	121,859	32.7	3,732	Colchester, Marks Tey	
66	Eastbourne	118,219	25.1	4,705	Eastbourne, Polegate	
67	Exeter	117,763	28.5	4,133	Exeter, Topsham	
68	Cheltenham	116,447	28.9	4,034	Cheltenham	
69	Torquay/ Paignton	115,410	31.5	3,667	Torquay, Paignton, Marldon	
70	Lincoln	114,879	32.7	3,518	Lincoln, North Hykeham	
71	Chesterfield	113,057	34.6	3,263	Chesterfield, Staveley, Wingerworth, Holymoorside	Wingerworth added.
72	Chelmsford	111,511	26.2	4,259	Chelmsford, Little Waltham	
73	Basingstoke	107,642	29.4	3,662	Basingstoke	
74	Maidstone	107,627	25.4	4,229	Maidstone	
75	Bedford	106,940	24.8	4,309	Bedford, Kempston	
76	Worcester	101,659	24.7	4,121	Worcester, Norton	

== Map ==
Locations of largest built-up areas:
Over 5 million Over 1 million 500,000–999,999 250,000–499,999 150,000–249,999 100,000–149,999

== See also ==
- City region (United Kingdom)
