= Ness Flowers =

Wales international rugby league & union footballer

Personal information
- Full name: Ness Flowers
- Born: Wales

Playing information

Rugby union
Club
Years	Team	Pld	T	G	FG	P
	Neath RFC
	Crynant RFC
	Ystradgynlais RFC
	Abercrave RFC
	Neath Athletic RFC
	Total	0	0	0	0	0

Rugby league
- Position: Scrum-half
Club
Years	Team	Pld	T	G	FG	P
1979–80	Wigan	15+1	4	0	0	12
1980–≤84	Huddersfield
≤1984–≥84	Cardiff City (Bridgend) Blue Dragons
	Total	16	4	0	0	12
Representative
Years	Team	Pld	T	G	FG	P
1980–84	Wales	4

Ness Flowers (birth unknown) is a Welsh former rugby union and professional rugby league footballer who played in the 1970s and 1980s. He captained the Welsh Schools Under-15's in 1971, and played for Wales Youth in 1973. At club level he played rugby union (RU) for Neath RFC, Crynant RFC, Ystradgynlais RFC, Abercrave RFC and Neath Athletic RFC, and representative level rugby league (RL) for Wales, and at club level for Wigan, Huddersfield and Cardiff City (Bridgend) Blue Dragons, as a scrum-half.

== International honours ==
Ness Flowers won 4 caps for Wales (RL) in 1980–1984 while at Wigan, and Cardiff City (Bridgend) Blue Dragons 1-tries 3-points.

== Note ==
Before the start of the 1984/85 season, Cardiff City Blue Dragons relocated from Ninian Park in Cardiff, to Coychurch Road Ground in Bridgend, and were renamed Bridgend Blue Dragons.
