= Thomas Levi =

Welsh minister (1825–1916)

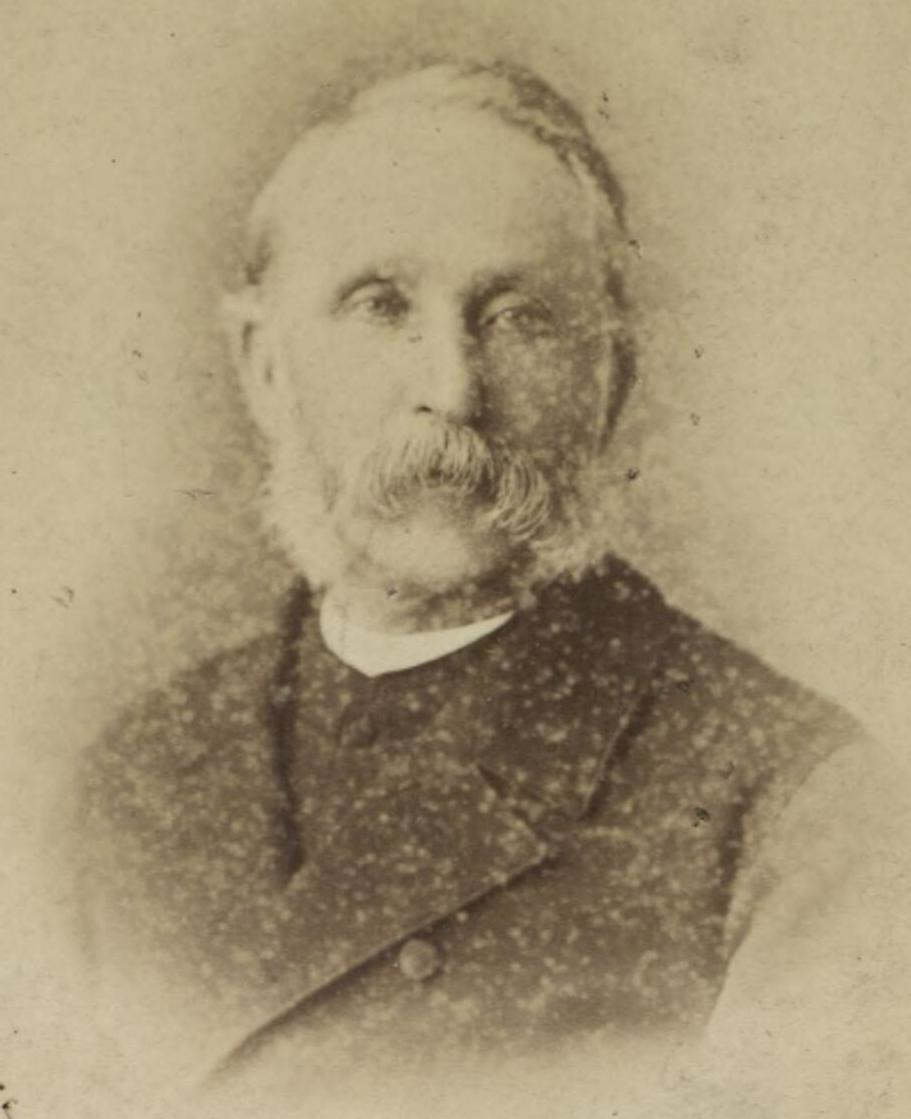
Thomas Levi (circa 1878)

Thomas Levi (12 October 1825 - 16 June 1916 ) was a Welsh, Calvinistic Methodist minister, and literary figure who also played a role in the political life of Wales. Born in Ystradgynlais he spent his later life as minister of Tabernacl, Aberystwyth.

== Early life ==
Levi was born at Penrhos, near Ystradgynlais in the Swansea Valley, Glamorgan, the son of John and Prudence Levi. It was often stated that his father was of Jewish origin. It is said that his father was a Jewish jeweller from Swansea. He received little formal education and worked as a boy at the Ynyscedwyn Ironworks. When the ironworks closed for a time due to a depression in trade, Levi migrated 25 miles to Tredegar ironworks. Following his mother's death, his father and brothers migrated to the United States. He began to preach when around twenty years of age.

== Career ==
Levi became minister of Capel yr Ynys, Ystradgynlais around 1855 and remained there until 1860 when he moved to Philadelphia, Morriston. After sixteen years, Levi received a call in 1876 to minister at Tabernacl, Aberystwyth, one of the leading chapels in the denomination, and he remained there for the remainder of his career.

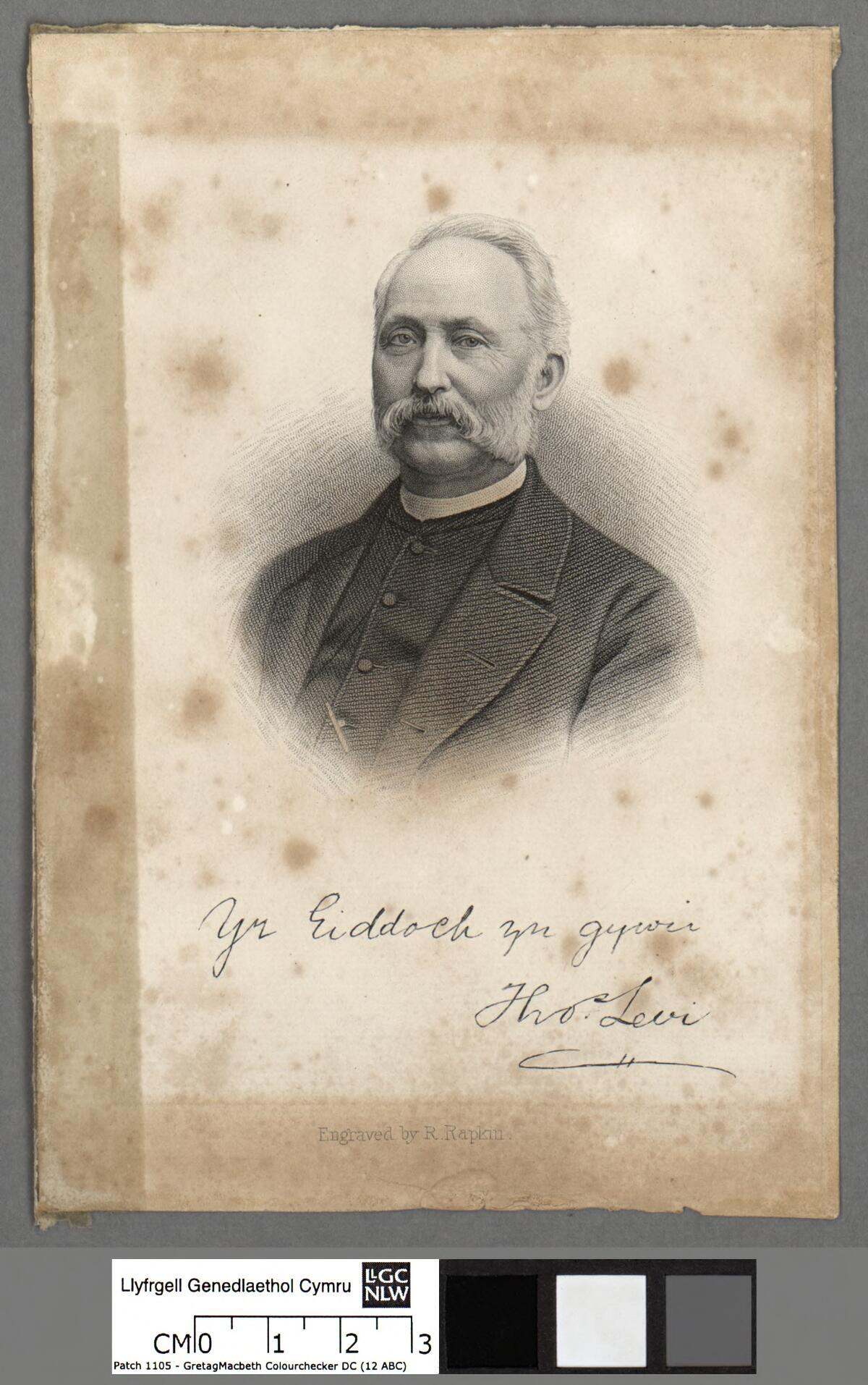
Portrait of Thomas Levi

== Literary activities ==
Levi wrote many books but his most significant achievement was founding Trysorfa y Plant (A Children's Treasury), a journal for children and young people, Levi was responsible for every monthly edition from 1862 until 1911 and the journal had a circulation of 44,000.

== Political activities ==
From his early days at Ystradgynlais, Levi was politically active, and he led a campaign against the efforts of the rector to levy a church rate in order to rebuild the parish church.

Levi was a Liberal member of Cardiganshire County Council from 1889 until 1895. His son, Professor T.A. Levi established the Law department at the University of Wales, Aberystwyth.

== Later life and death ==
Levi retired from the ministry in 1901. He died in 1916, aged 90.
