= Betws, Carmarthenshire =

Village and community in Carmarthenshire, Wales

Betws: Welsh: Y Betws
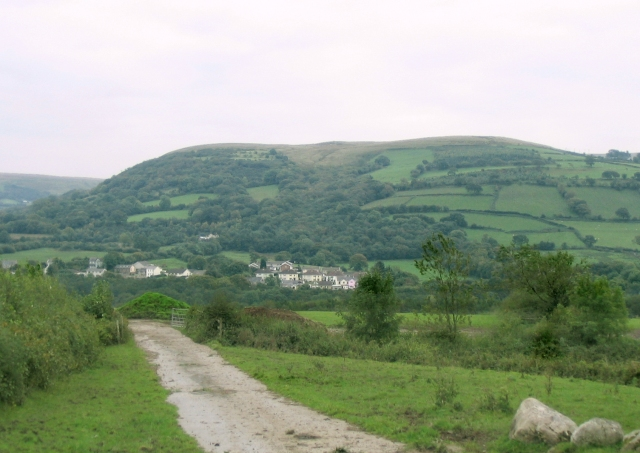

- Location within Carmarthenshire
- Population: 2,175
- OS grid reference: SN633116
- Community: Betws
- Principal area: Carmarthenshire
- Preserved county: Dyfed
- Country: Wales
- Sovereign state: United Kingdom
- Post town: AMMANFORD
- Postcode district: SA18
- Dialling code: 01269
- Police: Dyfed-Powys
- Fire: Mid and West Wales
- Ambulance: Welsh
- UK Parliament: Caerfyrddin
- Senedd Cymru – Welsh Parliament: Carmarthen East and Dinefwr
- List of places UK Wales Carmarthenshire 51.787°N 3.982°W Map of the community

Betws (/ˈbɛtuːs/; Welsh: Y Betws) is a small village and community on the River Amman in Carmarthenshire, Wales, some 15 miles north of Swansea; it is part of the ecclesiastical parish of Betws and Ammanford, and the urban area of Ammanford. The nearby mountain, at the western end of the Black Mountain, is named after the village, and has a large area of common land.

== History and location ==
The name 'Betws' is generally thought to be derived from the Anglo-Saxon 'bed-hus' - a house of prayer, or oratory, and means "chapel" in the Welsh language. Until the 19th century, when Ammanford developed extensively, Betws was the largest village in the area.

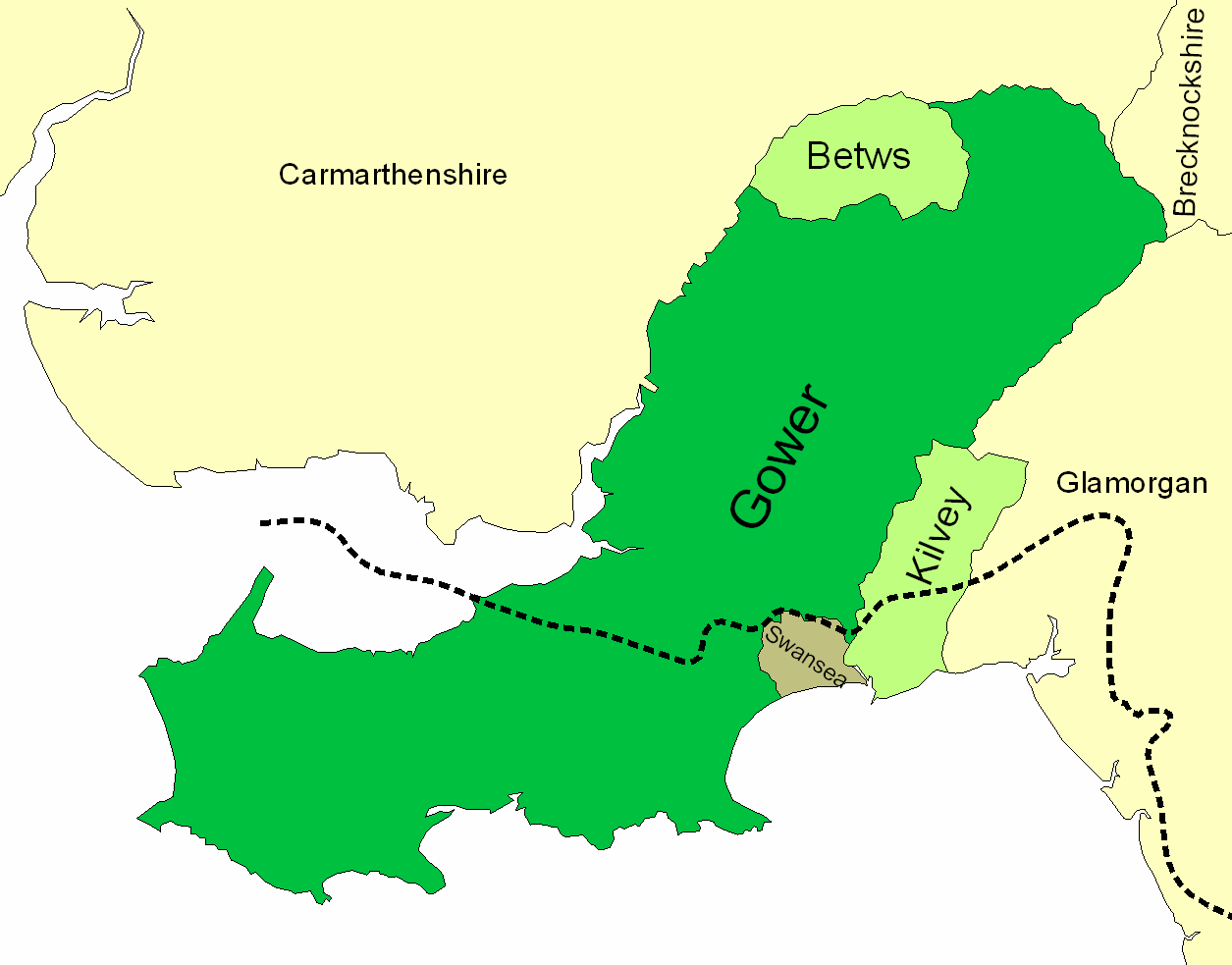
Map of the Lordship of Gower, showing Betws (later detached), Kilvey (later added), and the Town and Franchise of Swansea. The language boundary - with English to the south - is shown as a dotted line.

Until the 13th century, Betws was part of Gower, which is now known as the county of Swansea but the old commote border of the rivers Amman and Loughor moved south and Betws has since the Acts of Union been part of Welsh-speaking Carmarthenshire.

Until 1817, when a road was built along the Amman valley, Betws was only accessible by roads crossing the mountain from Neath and Swansea. This inaccessibility is commemorated in a local saying, which refers to the division between Betws a'r Byd (Betws and the world). There was a sign on the Amman bridge to this effect: Betws this way, the rest of the world that way.

The people of Betws like to make the distinction between themselves and those over the river in Ammanford.

The road bridge between Betws and Ammanford on Park Street was completed in 1892 and rebuilt in 1990 by T Richard Jones (Betws) Ltd. T. Richard Jones (Betws) Ltd. ('TRJ') is a major building contractor, originally based in the village but now located on the Ammanford side of the river.

The land for Betws Park was given to Ammanford district Council by Lord Dynevor in 1903, but the council used it as a rubbish dump until the early 1930s. After this, it was properly developed by local volunteers as a park with tennis courts. On 23 June 2007, a new 'Memorial and Sensory Garden' was opened in the park. In 2023 a grant from the National Lottery was used by the community council to remove old tennis courts and create a new nature garden.

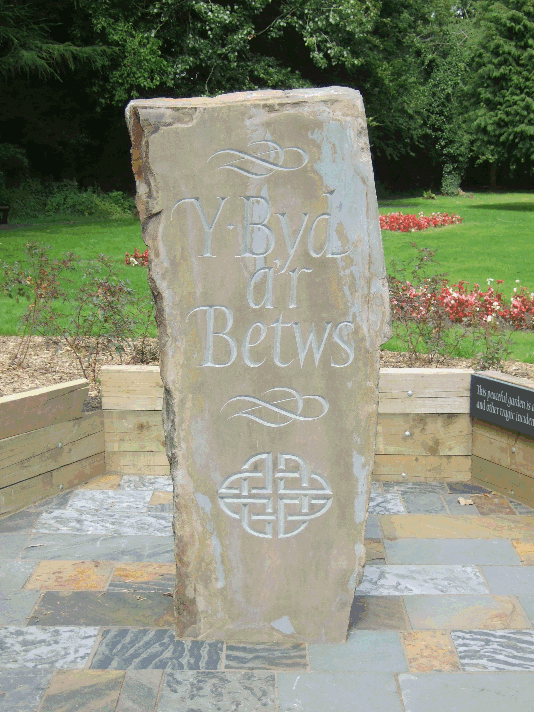
Memorial stone in Betws park. The plaque on the right reads "This peaceful garden is a living tribute to those who lost their lives in wars, mining accidents and other tragic incidents. THEIR MEMORY IS OUR HERITAGE."

Betws Park Workshops are a collection of industrial units rented by various businesses. The workshops were opened in 1991, having previously been a screw manufacturing factory (1970–1981) and a lightbulb factory (1983–1986).

The parish church in the village is dedicated to St David. It dates to the 14th century but was renovated in 1872. In addition to this church, the village is also home to the Presbyterian 'Capel Newydd'.

Betws Primary School was built before 1846, extended in 1928 and refurbished in 1988.

The Caemawr housing estate was built in 1947, and the Bwtrimawr estate in 1976.

Ammanford No. 1 (1890–1925) and No. 2 (1891–1976) Collieries were at the north end of Betws. The Tycoch nightclub occupied some Ammanford No. 1 buildings before being redeveloped as private residence. Betws drift coal mine opened in 1976 and closed in 2003 and the land is being redeveloped as housing and industrial units, including LBS Builders Merchants.

A wind farm was opened on Mynydd Y Betws in 2013

75.1% of residents of Betws and Pontamman said they had 'knowledge of Welsh language' compared to 63.6% in Carmarthenshire and 28.4% in Wales.

In the 2021 Census, the Betws ward electorate was 2,398 and the County Councillor is Betsan Jones (Plaid Cymru)

The community is bordered by the communities of: Llanedi; Ammanford; Llandybie; and Cwmamman, all being in Carmarthenshire; and by Mawr in the City and County of Swansea.

== Sports ==
Betws Rugby Club currently fields two rugby union teams: The first team finished 1st in WRU League Five South West in 2007–8 season and the second team finished bottom of Llanelli District Division 1.

Ammanford football club have a ground at Rice Street, Betws, which is currently being reconstructed.

== Notable people ==
- Harry Grindell Matthews (1880–1941), an English inventor who claimed to have invented a death ray; he had a laboratory on Betws mountain from 1934.
- David Rees Griffiths (1882–1953), bardic name of Amanwy, a Welsh poet, and an older brother of Jim Griffiths.
- Jim Griffiths (1890–1975), first Secretary of State for Wales and MP for Llanelli lived at the corner of Pentwyn Road and Park Street, where his father William was the village blacksmith (an anvil stands outside the house that occupies the site today).
- Donald Peers (1908–1973), balladeer, was brought up in Heol-y-felin.
- Ivor Richard, Baron Richard PC, QC (1932–2018) was born in Betws and attended Betws Primary School.
- Terry Magee (born 1964), charity volunteer and former boxer; lives locally.

== Wildlife ==
A wide variety of birds can be seen around Betws. Red kite, raven, buzzard, kestrel and sparrowhawks can be found on the mountain, whilst kingfisher, dipper and cormorant can be seen on the river. The woods are home to jay and green woodpecker.

== See also ==
- Betws, Carmarthenshire (electoral ward)
