= Howell Lewis =

Wales international rugby union footballer

- Born: Howell Lewis; 24 May 1888 Pontardawe, Wales
- Died: 29 May 1971 (aged 83) Guildford, England
- School: Ystalyfera Grammar School

Rugby union career
- Position: Wing
Amateur team(s)
Years	Team	Apps	(Points)
- Ystalyfera RFC
- Cwmtwrch RFC
- Cwmllynfell RFC
1912-1920	Swansea RFC		
International career
Years	Team	Apps	(Points)
1913-1914	Wales	4	(0)

Howell Lewis (24 May 1888 – 29 May 1971) was a Welsh international rugby union wing who played club rugby for Swansea Rugby Football Club and was capped for Wales on four occasions. Lewis was also part of the Swansea team that beat the touring South Africa team in 1912.

== Rugby career ==
Lewis joined Swansea in 1910 and in 1912 was part of the team that faced the touring South Africa national rugby union team. Swansea won the game by a single try, made more impressive by the fact that Lewis was off the field for a quarter of the match. During the game, Lewis took a blow on the bridge of his nose and when he confronted the perpetrator took another blow to his chest which staggered him. Lewis was removed from play to receive treatment, but no action was taken against South Africa. While Lewis was off the pitch, George Hayward was forced to switch to the wing, as substitutions were not part of the rules. Lewis returned to the pitch after twenty minutes to finish the game.

Lewis made his Welsh international debut on 1 February 1913 against Scotland as part of the Five Nations Championship. Lewis was one of five new Welsh caps on the day, after a poor game to England in the opening match of the tournament. The very inexperienced team played well under the captaincy of Billy Trew and Wales won 8–0. Lewis was reselected for the remaining two games of the Championship, both resulting in Welsh wins, away to France and at home to Ireland. Lewis's last game was the opening match of the 1914 Championship, which saw Wales lose narrowly at Twickenham to England.

In 1914 Lewis was given the captaincy of Swansea, but the outbreak of World War I halted the regular playing of rugby in Great Britain. In 1915, Lewis was captain of a West Wales team that faced an ANZAC team at St. Helens, During the war, Lewis reached the rank of captain in the Royal Welch Fusiliers, returning to yet again captain Swansea in peacetime during the 1919/1920 season. He retired from rugby in 1920.

=== International matches played ===
Wales

- England 1914
- France 1913
- Ireland 1913
- Scotland 1913

== Bibliography ==
- Billot, John (1974). Springboks in Wales. Ferndale: Ron Jones Publications.
- Godwin, Terry (1984). The International Rugby Championship 1883-1983. London: Willows Books. ISBN 0-00-218060-X.
- Griffiths, John (1987). The Phoenix Book of International Rugby Records. London: Phoenix House. ISBN 0-460-07003-7.
- Smith, David; Williams, Gareth (1980). Fields of Praise: The Official History of The Welsh Rugby Union. Cardiff: University of Wales Press. ISBN 0-7083-0766-3.

Rugby Union Captain
Preceded by World War I	Swansea RFC captain 1919-1920	Succeeded by Tom Parker
