= Joseph Jones (rugby) =

Wales dual-code international rugby footballer

Joe Jones
Personal information
- Full name: Joseph Jones
- Born: 15 March 1899 Pontardawe, Wales
- Died: 27 January 1960 (aged 60) Liverpool, England

Playing information

Rugby union
- Position: Centre
Club
Years	Team	Pld	T	G	FG	P
≤1923–23	Ystradgynlais RFC
1923–24	Swansea RFC
	Total	0	0	0	0	0
Representative
Years	Team	Pld	T	G	FG	P
1924	Wales	1	0	0	0	0

Rugby league
- Position: Centre
Club
Years	Team	Pld	T	G	FG	P
1924–29	Leeds
Jan 1929–≥29	Wakefield Trinity	124	19	0	0	57
	Total	124	19	0	0	57
Representative
Years	Team	Pld	T	G	FG	P
1924	Other Nationalities	1	1	0	0	3
1926	Wales	1	0	0	0	0

Joseph "Joe" Jones (15 March 1899 – 27 January 1960) was a Welsh dual-code international rugby union, and professional rugby league footballer who played in the 1920s and 1930s. He played representative level rugby union (RU) for Wales, and at club level for Ystradgynlais RFC and Swansea RFC, as a Centre, and representative level rugby league (RL) for Wales, and at club level for Leeds and Wakefield Trinity, as a centre.

== Background ==
Joe Jones born in Pontardawe, Wales, and he died aged 60 in Liverpool, England.

== Playing career ==
=== Rugby union career ===
Jones initially played rugby union for Ystradgynlais RFC before switching in 1923 to the first-class Welsh club Swansea. While with Swansea, Jones was selected for his one and only international game, as a centre in Wales' 10-6 victory over France in the 1924 Five Nations Championship match at Stade Colombes on 27 March 1924. That same year Jones left union, and any future international caps for the Wales union team, behind him when he 'Went North' switching to the professional league code.

=== International honours ===
Joe Jones won a cap for Wales (RU) while at Swansea RFC in 1924, and won a cap for Wales (RL) while at Leeds in 1926.

=== Notable tour matches ===
Joe Jones played at centre in Wakefield Trinity's 14–3 victory over Australia in the tour match at Belle Vue, Wakefield on Saturday 28 September 1929.

"The Colonials had a strong side, but were well and truly beaten in a game in which Trinity surprised friend and foe alike by a great display. They were the first team to beat the Australians on that tour."

== Contemporaneous Article Extract ==
"Joseph Jones. The death of Mr. Joe Jones three weeks ago came upon us suddenly, although it had been apparent to those in closest touch with him that his health was failing. We had hoped that he might make a complete recovery and be able to resume his place in the club's councils which he so much valued. His earliest football in his native Wales had brought him international honours when he decided to change his code and join Leeds R.L.F.C. Soon he was at Belle Vue where, for over thirty years he has rendered most useful and untiring service as a player, then on the Staff, and for the last 13½ years on the committee. He has also been Vice-Chairman of the Club and a member of the Rugby League Council. Thus, to our great regret, another good club man has been removed from our midst. Our sympathy goes to his family in their bereavement, the more so since Mrs. Jones has been for some time suffering from serious illness, a combination of extremely sad circumstances."
