= Newport built-up area =

Urban area in Wales

Coordinates: 51°35′N 3°00′W

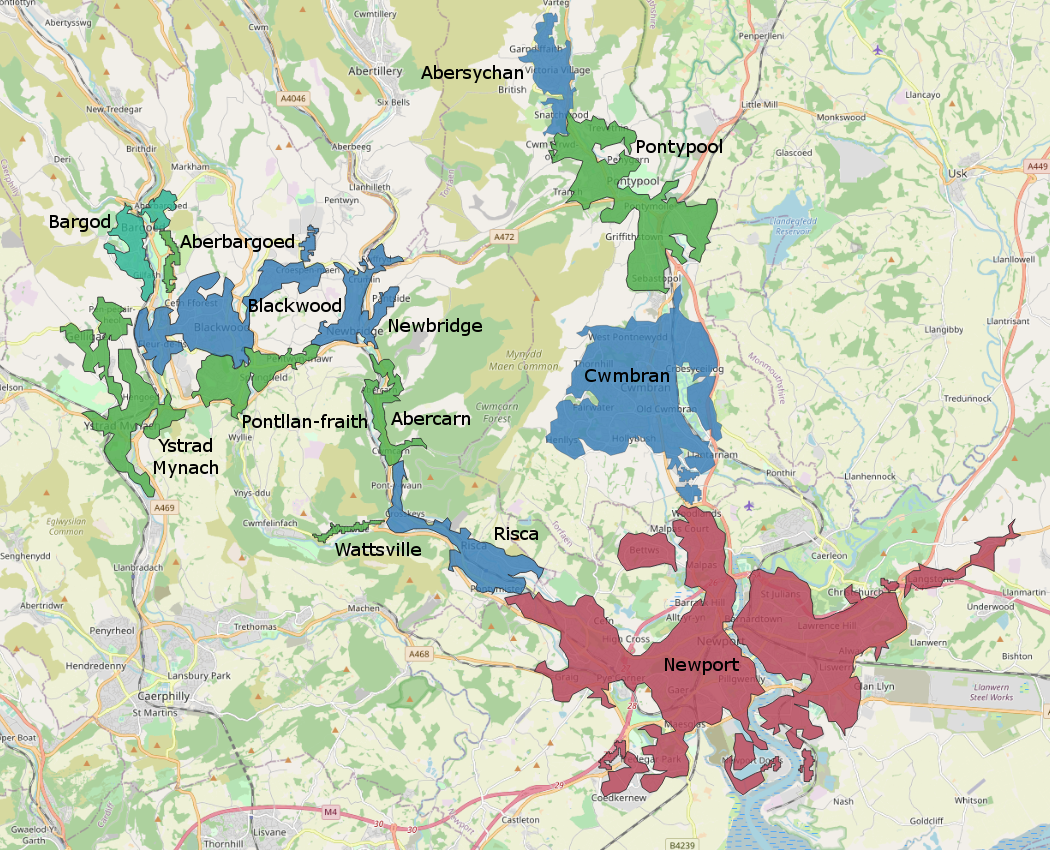
Map of the Newport Urban Area with subdivisions

The Newport Built-up area (previously known in official statistics as the Newport Urban Area) is an area of land defined by the United Kingdom Office for National Statistics (ONS) for population monitoring purposes. It is an urban conurbation and is not coterminous with the city boundaries. It consists of the urban area centred on Newport as well as contiguous settlements in the eastern and western valleys extending north of the city – including Cwmbran, Pontypool, Risca, Abercarn and Blackwood. It does however exclude physically detached urban areas within the city boundaries, such as Marshfield.

The detailed methodology of the process used across the UK by ONS in 2011 is set out in 2011 Built-up Areas - Methodology and Guidance, published in June 2013. It is summarised as "..a ‘bricks and mortar’ approach, with areas defined as built-up land with a minimum area of 20 hectares (0.2 km^{2} / 0.077 mile^{2}), while settlements within 200 metres of each other are linked. Built-up area sub-divisions are also identified to provide greater detail in the data, especially in the larger conurbations."

The total population of the built-up area defined on this basis in 2011 was 306,844, making Newport the 23rd largest conurbation in England and Wales and the 2nd largest in Wales.

== Subdivisions ==
The ONS provides sub-division statistics for the Newport Urban Area in 2011

Rank	Urban sub-area name	Population	Area (km^{2)}	Population density (per km^{2})
-	Newport (built-up area)	306,844	84.22 km^{2}	3,643.363
1	Newport (sub division)	128,060	34.72 km^{2}	3,688.364
2	Cwmbran	46,915	14.17 km^{2}	3,310.868
3	Pontypool	28,334	8.065 km^{2}	3,513.205
4	Blackwood	24,042	6.415 km^{2}	3,747.779
5	Ystrad Mynach	19,204	5.065 km^{2}	3,791.51
6	Risca	14,958	3.4975 km^{2}	4,276.769
7	Bargoed	11,900	7.1449 km^{2}	1,665.524
8	Newbridge	9,590	2.4675 km^{2}	3,886.525
9	Pontllanfraith	9,220	2.8225 km^{2}	3,266.608
10	Abersychan	7,573	2.3625 km^{2}	3,205.503
11	Abercarn	5,352	1.4925 km^{2}	3,585.93
12	Wattsville	1,065	0.3025 km^{2}	3,520.661
13	Aberbargoed	994	0.425 km^{2}	2,338.824

== See also ==
- List of conurbations in the United Kingdom
- List of Welsh principal areas by population
- List of Welsh principal areas by area
- List of localities in Wales by population
