= Emlyn Davies =

Wales international rugby union player (1922-2016)

- Born: Emlyn Price Davies; 15 January 1922 Port Talbot, Wales
- Died: 6 September 2016 (aged 94)
- School: Maesteg Grammar School

Rugby union career
- Position: Prop
Amateur team(s)
Years	Team	Apps	(Points)
- Cwmavon RFC
–	Cymmer RFC		
–	Glyncorrwg RFC		
–	Maesteg RFC		
–	Swansea RFC		
–	Aberavon RFC		
International career
Years	Team	Apps	(Points)
1947–1948	Wales	2	(0)

Emlyn Price Davies (15 January 1922 – 6 September 2016) was a Welsh international rugby union prop who played club rugby for Swansea and Aberavon and county rugby for Glamorgan. He was capped for Wales national rugby union team on two occasions.

Davies played for a wide variety of club teams, but it was while he was with Aberavon that he was selected to play for Wales against the touring, 1947 Australian team. It was a dull encounter played out between the forwards, but Davies finished on the winning side as Wales won 6–0. Davies gained his second and final cap in the 1948 Five Nations Championship in the last game of the tournament against Ireland. It was a close game, but Ireland won 6–3, and won the Triple Crown for the first time since 1899. He died on 6 September 2016 at the age of 94.

== International matches played ==
Wales

- Australia 1947
- Ireland 1948

== Bibliography ==
- Smith, David; Williams, Gareth (1980). Fields of Praise: The Official History of The Welsh Rugby Union. Cardiff: University of Wales Press. ISBN 0-7083-0766-3.
