= Resolven RFC =

Welsh rugby union club, based in Resolven

(Wales) Resolven RFC
- Full name: Resolven Rugby Football Club
- Founded: 1885; 141 years ago
- Location: Resolven, Wales
- Ground: Vaughan Field (Capacity: 600)
- Chairman: Benny Seymour
- Coach: Darran Griffiths/Leighton Probert/Ian Williams - Conditioning
- League: WRU Division Three South West
- 2011/12: 2nd WRU Division Four South West
Team kit

Official website
- www.pitchero.com/clubs/resolvenrfc/

Resolven Rugby Football Club are a Welsh rugby union club based in Resolven in Wales and are a feeder club for the Ospreys.

== History ==
Rugby was supposedly introduced to Resolven by two visiting engineers; Charlie Thomas and Alf Morgan, in 1885. The Club first played at Tan-y- Rhiw, then the Brick Field, then in 1898 to Sardis field until moving again, this time to the Farmers Field. Between the World Wars rugby was played on the Drehir ground on which the club had managed to acquire a changing room and grandstand. During the Second World War the Drehir ground was used by the UK government to build a munitions factory. In 1945 this left Resolven RFC in the position of being members of the WRU but without a playing field.

On 31 October 1946 a new ground at Tan-y-Rhiw field was opened on which Resolven play rugby to this day. Capt. J.N. Vaughan granted the use of the field and on 14 October 1954 the Vaughan family of Rheola donated the freehold of the property to Resolven Rugby Football Club. The field was renamed the Vaughan Rugby Ground in honour of their benefactor.

In May 2006 Resolven RFC were one of the 13 'Rebel' clubs who brought a vote of no confidence against the WRU, which centered on financing and the handling of former coach Mike Ruddock's departure. The vote failed heavily with only 20 votes for the motion and over 300 against.

Heading into the 2010/2011 season Resolven celebrate their 125th Anniversary. Coached by former Aberavon wing Darran Griffiths and Resolven rugby stalwart Leighton Probert. The team consists of a core of local rugby players who have played for the club most of their lives. The team are looking to bounce back from relegation and win automatic promotion. The 2010/11 season will see the first team being captained by hooker Nikki Reed, and will also see Richard Davies reverting from a period operating in the number 8 position to his more familiar role in the second row.

The 2010/2011 season proved to be one of the most successful in modern years for the Vaughn field club. Celebrating their 125th Anniversary, they won division 5 South Central only losing 1 game, reached the final of the West Wales Rugby union Plate (Lost 53–19 against Amman utd) and reached the quarter-finals of the Glamorgan County Silver Ball competition.

== Club honours ==
- 1934-35 West Wales Rugby Union Champions
- 1994-95 Welsh League Division 7 Central - Champions
- 1995-96 Glamorgan County Silver Ball Trophy - Winners
- 2003-04 Welsh League Division 5 South West - Champions
- 2010-11 Welsh League Division 5 South Central - Champions

== Players of note ==
- (Wales) Mel De Lloyd
- (Wales) Stuart Evans
- (Wales) Mel James
- (Wales) David Jenkins (2 caps)
- (Wales) Reg Lloyd
