= Maesteg Celtic RFC =

- Full name: Maesteg Celtic Rugby Football Club
- Nickname(s): Celts
- Location: Maesteg, Bridgend
- Ground(s): Bridgend Road
- Chairman: Ian Davies
- Coach(es): Giovanni Cirotto
- League(s): WRU Division 2 West Central
- 2011-12: 1st
Team kit

Official website
- www.maestegcelticrfc.co.uk

Maesteg Celtic Rugby Football Club is a rugby union team from the town of Maesteg, South Wales. Maesteg Celtic RFC presently play in the Welsh Rugby Union Division Three South West League having gained promotion during the 2007/08 season. The club is a member of the Welsh Rugby Union and is a feeder club for the Ospreys. The club fields First, Second, Youth, Junior and Mini teams.

== Club honours ==
- WRU Division Four South West 2011/12 - Champions

== Notable former players ==
- (Wales) Allan Bateman
- (Wales) Windsor Major
- (Wales) Howard Nicholls
- (Wales) Ffion Bowen
- (Wales) Harri Morgan
