= Clive Rowlands =

Welsh rugby union footballer and coach (1938–2023)

Clive Rowlands OBE
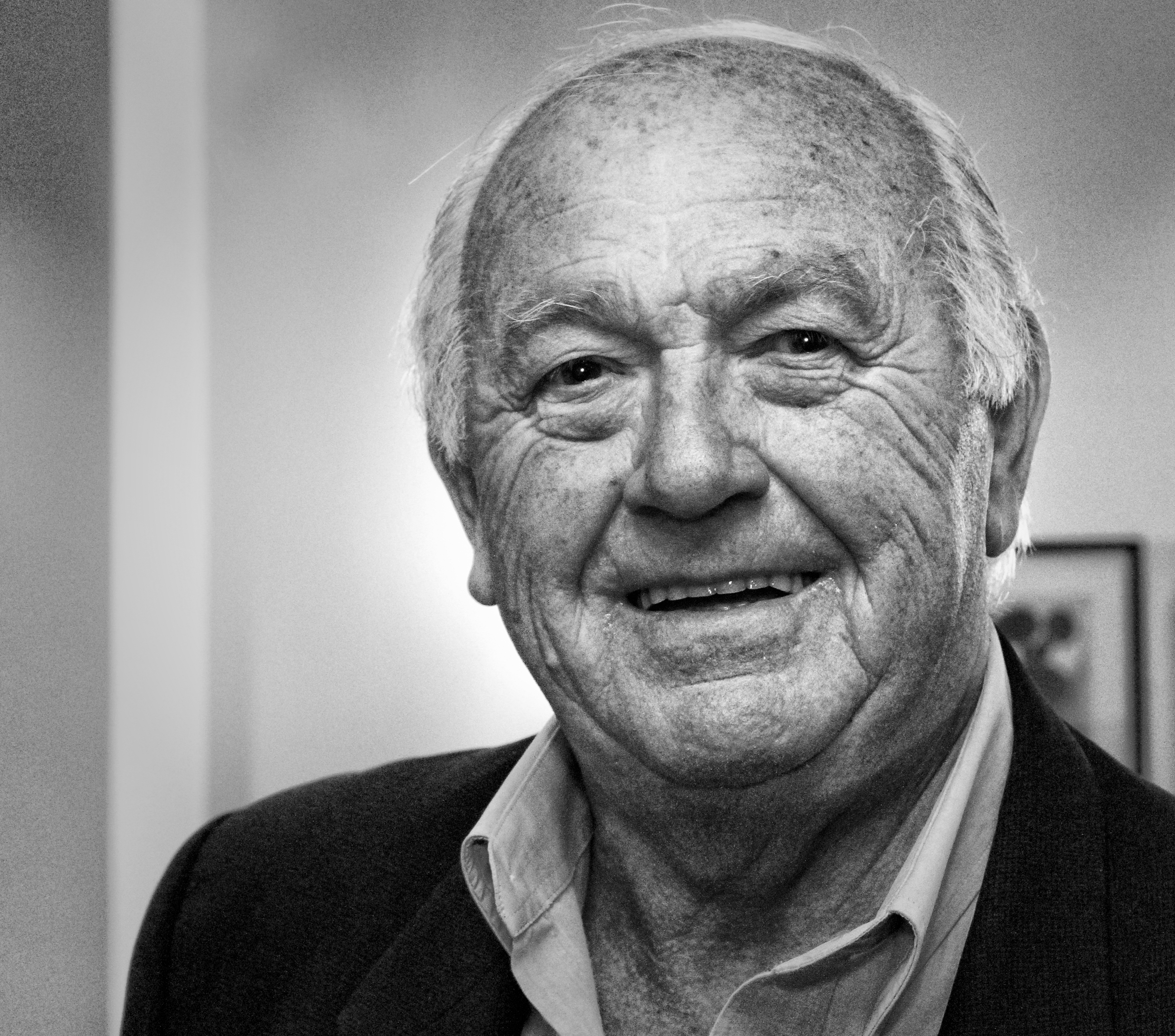
- Born: Daniel Clive Thomas Rowlands; 14 May 1938 Upper Cwmtwrch, Wales
- Died: 29 July 2023 (aged 85) Swansea, Wales
- Occupation: Teacher

Rugby union career
- Position: Scrum half
Amateur team(s)
Years	Team	Apps	(Points)
- Cwmtwrch RFC
–	Abercrave RFC		
–	Pontypool RFC		
–	Llanelli RFC		
–	Swansea RFC		
International career
Years	Team	Apps	(Points)
1963–1965	Wales	14	(3)

Daniel Clive Thomas Rowlands OBE (14 May 1938 – 29 July 2023) was a Welsh rugby union footballer and coach.

Rowlands was born in Upper Cwmtwrch on 14 May 1938. As recorded in the preface for the book The Children of Craig-Y-Nos, Rowlands was admitted in 1947, as an eight-year-old, to Craig-y-nos TB hospital in Breconshire. He was given a rugby ball as a gift and accidentally kicked it through a glass door, for which he was put in a straitjacket for a week. A teacher by profession, he played club rugby at scrum-half for Abercraf, Pontypool, Llanelli and Swansea. He captained Pontypool in the 1962–63 season, and captained Swansea in the 1967–1968 season

Unusually, his first cap for Wales against England in 1963 was as captain, a position which he retained for his next 13 caps between 1963 and 1965, leading Wales to their first Triple Crown victory since 1952. He captained Wales in every game he played including Wales' first match outside of Europe and its first in the Southern Hemisphere; played against East Africa in Nairobi on 12 May 1964, Wales winning 8-26.

In the 1963 Five Nations match against Scotland, in wet and muddy conditions, Rowlands decided to kick for touch as many times as possible, with the result that there were 111 line-outs in the match and Wales outside-half David Watkins only touched the ball five times. Wales won 6-0 (including a drop goal from Rowlands, his only international points) but the International Rugby Board eventually responded with a change in the laws in 1970, eliminating the gain in ground for kicks directly into touch from outside the team's own 22.

After retiring as a player, Rowlands was coach of the Welsh national team for 29 matches between 1968 and 1974, becoming the youngest person to hold this position. This was a successful period for Wales, including a Grand Slam in 1971 and included the tour of New Zealand in 1969. He was manager of the British and Irish Lions tour to Australia in 1989, managed the British Isles team versus a rest-of-the-world team in 1986, and also managed Wales in the 1987 Rugby World Cup. He was President of the Welsh Rugby Union in 1989.

After recovering from cancer in the 1990s, Rowlands focused his attention on raising money for cancer charities. He died after a fall at home on 29 July 2023, at the age of 85.
