= Cwmtwrch =

Human settlement in the Swansea Valley, Wales

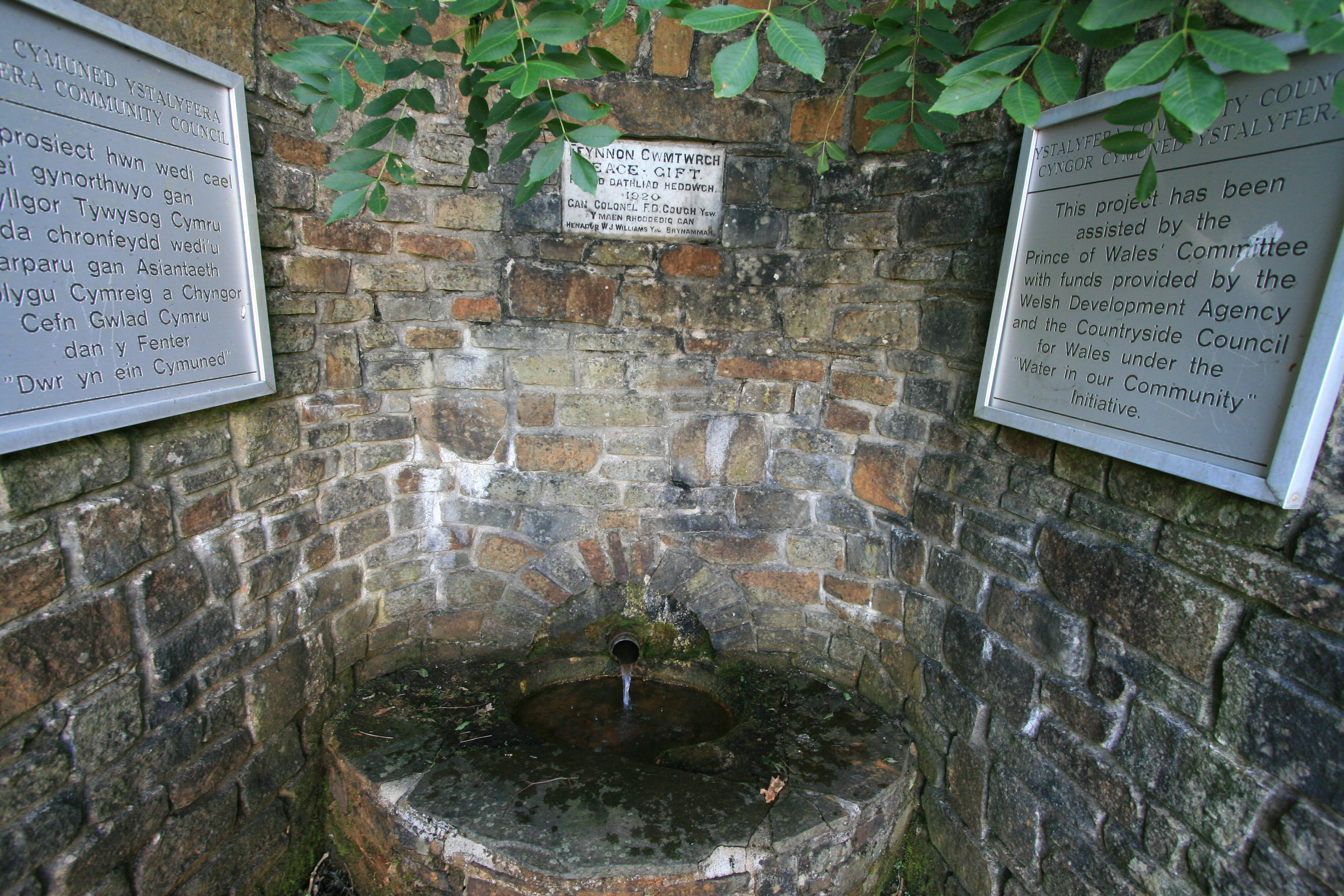
Cwmtwrch natural spring

Cwmtwrch (Welsh pronunciation: [ˈkʊmtʊrχ]) is a village in the valley of the Afon Twrch, a right-bank tributary to the Swansea Valley, Wales, some 15 miles north of Swansea. It is also the name of an electoral ward to Powys County Council.

Actors Craig Russell, Richard Corgan and Steven Meo all come from the village.

The Sci Fi comedy horror film Canaries is set and was filmed in Cwmtwrch.

== In Welsh mythology ==
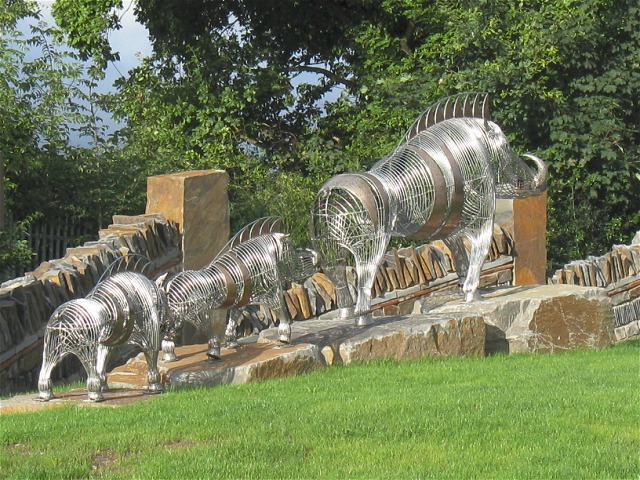
A sculpture of the Twrch Trwyth at Ammanford

In Welsh toponymy, Cwmtwrch means 'the valley of Afon Twrch' with Twrch being heavily associated with the "Twrch Trwyth" from Welsh mythology. This legendary wild boar is referenced throughout Medieval Welsh literature, in the Book of Aneirin, the Historia Brittonum, the romance Culhwch and Olwen, the Mabinogion and in several Middle Welsh poems and legends of King Arthur.

One Arthurian tale sees the King tasked with ridding the western Brecon Beacons of a pack of wild boars that terrorise the people. Arthur chases the boars from Dyfed eastward towards Powys. On the Black Mountain, he picks up a large stone (the carreg fryn fras still to be found on the mountain) and cast it towards the wild animals, striking dead the leader of the pack on the edge of a valley near Craig-y-Fran Gorge. The big boar's body rolls down the valley and into the river, which thereafter is known as Afon Twrch.

== History ==
The early history of Cwmtwrch is found in the records of the Manor of Palleg. This small estate was owned by the Aubrey family in the early 16th century. In 1595 it was said to include 20 farms scattered around the high ground to the north of the Twrch river. There was also a corn mill, Melin Palleg, close to the river.

The manor passed to the Morgan family of Tredegar House, Newport South Wales, by the late 18th century. They employed a gamekeeper to look after the estate. Local woodland would have been a source of charcoal for the early iron furnace at Ynyscedwyn from the 17th century onwards. The best of the mature hardwood trees from the area were felled and sold off during the early 19th century.

The now vanished Tir-y-gof Farm was used by drovers as a base where their cattle were shod on their long journeys to market. Alongside the industrial workers there were tailors, shoemakers and blacksmiths, publicans and shopkeepers. There were also numerous chapels in the village, namely Bethania Chapel (1851), Bethel Chapel (1861), Beulah Chapel (1893) and Capel Newydd (1930).

Ebeneser Rees (1848–1908), the founder of the "Llais Llafur" newspaper, was raised in Cwmtwrch and is buried in the Beulah Chapel Cemetery, Palleg.

The Cwmtwrch Miners' Welfare Hall is a focal point of community life. The hall opened in 1924, having been erected on a parcel of land leased from Lord Tredegar in 1895 for recreational use in the community. It operates as a registered charity with the objective of providing facilities for recreation, education and social integration. The hall hosts a range of cultural and community activities. In 2022 it became home to Valley Escape - a non-profit escape room established by a group of local volunteers.

Cwmtwrch has been split into two parts, Upper Cwmtwrch (Cwm Twrch Uchaf) and Lower Cwmtwrch (Cwm Twrch Isaf), due to the traversing of the now defunct railway line and road at two points, requiring an upper and a lower gate.

Nearby are the town of Ystradgynlais and the villages of Ystradowen, Rhiwfawr and Ystalyfera.

== Governance ==
Cwm-twrch is the name of the electoral ward which covers the western quarter of the Ystradgynlais community and includes Cwmtwrch Isaf to the south and Cwmtwrch Uchaf to the north. In 2004 a slice of the neighbouring Neath Port Talbot ward of Ystalyfera, bordering Cwmtwrch Isaf, was transferred to the Cwm-twrch ward. The ward elects one county councillor to Powys County Council.

A Cwmtwrch & Gurnos ward is represented by up to four town councillors on Ystradgynlais Town Council.

== Sport ==
Cwmtwrch is home to the rugby union team Cwmtwrch RFC, a Welsh Rugby Union affiliated club with over a hundred years of history. A notable resident of the village was Clive Rowlands, former Wales national rugby union team captain, who also managed both the national team and the British Lions.

The village football team, Cwm Wanderers A.F.C., is long established and successful, having won the Neath Premier Division on 16 occasions. They have also won 15 cups, making them the most successful team in the league's history.

Golf is played at Palleg Golf Club which is located in Lower Cwmtwrch. A mountain course, it was extended to eighteen holes through lottery funding.
