= Betws RFC =

Welsh rugby team

- Full name: Clwb Rygbi Betws / Betws Rugby Football Club
- Union: Welsh Rugby Union
- Founded: 1903 (Official Recognition) and 1953 (Re-formed)
- Location: Betws, Wales
- Region: Scarlets
- Ground(s): Maes y Felin
- Chairman: Richard Rees
- Coach(es): Chris Morgan
- Captain(s): Gareth Comley
- League(s): WRU Division 3 West B
- 2022-2023: 12th
Team kit

Official website
- www.betws.rfc.wales

Betws Rugby Football Club (Welsh: Clwb Rygbi Betws) is a Welsh rugby union club based in Betws, Carmarthenshire, Wales. Betws RFC is a member of the Welsh Rugby Union and is a feeder club for the Scarlets.

== History ==
Although it is accepted that Betws RFC was in existence some years before the 1890s, the first hard evidence that the club existed was through an Amman United fixture card dating from 1903 and so this was the date taken as the birth of the club.

There is also little known about the club until after the Second World War. The club was certainly extant and playing in the late 1940s, officially reforming in 1953. As members of Llanelli & District they soon became successful and a decade later they had added 11 district titles. The 1959/60 season saw the club record a treble when they claimed the League Championship Challenge Shield, Open Cup and Lady Howard Cup and the continued success was evident in 1967/68 when they retained the Open and Lady Howard Cups supposedly from the season before.

There was then a barren period until the 1992/93 season, when the club claimed the Doreen Rogers Cup and Section B Championship.

During this period the club worked hard on and off the field with the aim of securing WRU status. This was achieved in 1997/98 and they signed off from Llanelli & District Rugby in style by securing Section A titles in 95/96, 96/97 and 97/98. As well as triple League Championship Challenge Shields the club also the Lady Howard Cup in both 95/96 and 97/98 and the Champions Cup in 95/96.

The club demonstrated competency fit for the WRU National Leagues with immediate promotion from division 7 in 98/99 and in 2007/08 they secured the Division 5 title.

The Seconds continued in Llanelli & District, they won the Section B title in 2005/06 and again in 2007/08 emulating the 1sts divisional success, they also secured the only Llanelli & District title that had eluded the 1sts - the Buckley Cup.

The 1st XV currently play in WRU League 3 West B.

== Club honours ==
* denotes Second Team

WRU National Leagues:

Division 7 1998/99 - Runners Up

WRU Division Five South West 2007/08 - Champions

Llanelli & District Titles won by Betws RFC:

1953/54 Open Cup

1954/55 Open Cup

1956/57 Lady Howard Cup (Cup winners v League Champions)

1957/58 Open Cup, Lady Howard Cup

1958/59 League Championship Challenge Shield (LCCS)

1959/60 LCCS, Open Cup, Lady Howard Cup

1962/63 LCCS, Lady Howard Cup

1964/65 Lady Howard Cup

1966/67 Lady Howard Cup, Open Cup

1967/68 Open Cup, Lady Howard Cup

1992/93 Section B Champions, Doreen Rogers Cup

1995/96 LCCS (Section A), Lady Howard Cup, Champions Cup

1996/97 LCCS (Section A)

1997/98 LCCS (Section A), Lady Howard Cup

2005/06 Section B Champions*

2007/08 Section B Champions, Buckleys Cup*
