= Glyncorrwg RFC =

(Wales) Glyncorrwg RFC
- Full name: Glyncorrwg Rugby Football Club
- Founded: 1880
- Location: Glyncorrwg, Wales
- Ground(s): Ynyscorrwg Park
- League(s): WRU Division Four South West
- 2012/13: 2nd
Team kit

Glyncorrwg Rugby Football Club are a Welsh rugby union club based in the town of Glyncorrwg in Wales, UK. The club is a member of the Welsh Rugby Union and is also a feeder club for the Ospreys. The club fields a First, Youth, and several juniors teams.

== Notable former players ==
- (Wales) Emlyn Davies (2 caps)
