= Cyril Challinor =

Wales international rugby union player

- Born: 13 May 1912 Crynant, Wales
- Died: 29 November 1976 (aged 64) Neath, Wales

Rugby union career
- Position: Wing-forward
International career
Years	Team	Apps	(Points)
1939	Wales	1	(0)

Cyril Challinor (13 May 1912 — 29 November 1976) was a Welsh international rugby union player.

Challinor hailed from Crynant near Neath and joined Crynant RFC as a teenager.

A wing-forward, Challinor moved to Neath RFC during the 1933–34 season, from where he gained his solitary Wales cap in the 1939 Home Nations, playing against England at Twickenham.

Challinor remained with Neath until retiring after the 1945–46 season, but continued to serve the club with various roles on the committee, including chairman. He was an engineering foreman by profession and worked at Blaenant Colliery.

== See also ==
- List of Wales national rugby union players
