= Roy John (rugby union) =

British Lions & Wales international rugby union footballer (1925–1981)

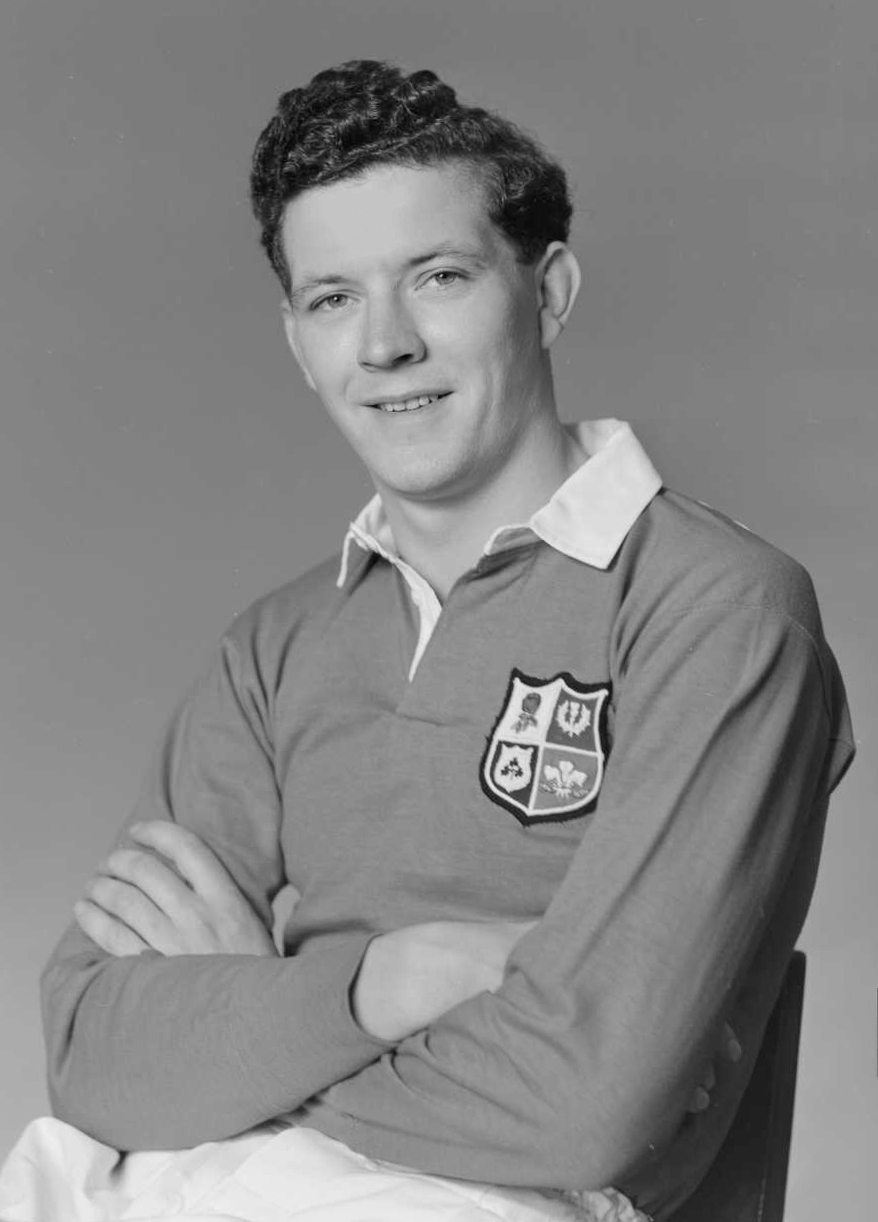
- John in New Zealand in 1950
- Born: Ernest Raymond John; 3 December 1925 Crynant, Neath Port Talbot, Wales
- Died: 30 September 1981 (aged 55) Neath, Wales
- Height: 6 ft 2 in (1.88 m)
- Weight: 13 st 9 lb (87 kg; 191 lb)
- School: Neath Grammar School
- Occupation: Quantity surveyor

Rugby union career
- Position(s): Lock, Flanker
Amateur team(s)
Years	Team	Apps	(Points)
- Crynant RFC
–	Neath RFC		
–	Glamorgan County RFC		
–	Barbarian F.C.		
International career
Years	Team	Apps	(Points)
1950–1954	Wales	19	(3)
1950	British Lions	6	(3)

Ernest Raymond "Roy" John (3 December 1925 – 30 September 1981) was a Wales and British Lions international rugby union lock. He played club rugby for Crynant and Neath. John was capped 19 times for Wales and was a member of two Grand Slam winning teams. In 1950 he was selected for the 1950 British Lions tour to New Zealand and Australia. John was an agile runner for a lock, but was most notable for his excellent ability in line-outs.

== Rugby career ==
John played rugby from a young age and represented his local grammar school as a youth. His first club was Crynant, but by the time he gained his first cap in 1950 he had switched to first-class side Neath. His international debut came on 21 January against England as part of the 1950 Five Nations Championship. John gained his place as his club partner, Rees Stephens had been forced to withdraw from the team. John was one of five new caps entering a team that had finished bottom of the table in the year's previous tournament. Wales beat England 11–5 and John was reselected for the remaining three matches of the campaign. After wins over Scotland and Ireland to take the Triple Crown, John scored his first and only try for Wales in a victory over France to give the team the Grand Slam title.

Two months after the encounter with France, John was playing for the British Lions team touring Australia and New Zealand. Both he and Stephens were selected becoming the first players to represent the Lions from the Neath club. He played in twenty-two matches of the tour and played in all six Test matches. During the tour he scored two tries, one in the win against a joint Manawatu–Horowhenua team, and the other in the second Test against Australia. During the tour, John was used in three of the Tests as a number 8, both the Australian matches and the third Test to New Zealand at Wellington. During the 1950–51 season John was given the captaincy of the Neath team.

John was back in the Wales squad for the 1951 Five Nations Championship playing in all four matches. Despite a resounding win over England in the opening match, Wales ended the competition on third after draw with Ireland and loses to France and Ireland. The same year John faced the 1951 touring South Africa team. First at club level when a joint Aberavon and Neath team on 17 November, and then a country level with Wales, twice ending on the losing side. Despite losing to the South Africans with Wales, John so dominated the line-out that the Springboks' coach, Danie Craven, ordered his team not to contest them.

John continued his unbroken run of Wales appearances with another four games in the 1952 Five Nations Championship. The pivotal game of the tournament turned out to be the team's first match away to England. England led the encounter in the first half with England scoring two tries when key Welsh player Lewis Jones was off the pitch for treatment. Wales responded strongly in the second half led by their pack with John dominating the line-out. Wales went on to win all three remaining games giving John his second Grand Slam title. 1952 also saw Neath tour Ireland, which John joined despite being on honeymoon there.

1953 saw John complete his fourth full Championship, in which Wales came second, losing just one game to eventual winners England. John's penultimate international came in December 1953, when he was chosen to face the touring New Zealand team. Although John no longer possessed his old agility, a storming response from the forwards saw Wales snatch their last win over the All Blacks that century. John faced the same New Zealand team in late January 1954, when another joint Aberavon/Neath team lost 11–5 to the tourists.

John's final international, his nineteenth consecutive game for Wales, was an away match to England, which Wales lost through a last minute try from England's Chris Winn.

=== Playing style ===
While a youth at Neath Grammar School, John had played on the wing, at centre and at fly-half before moving into the back row. Despite his height, at 6 ft 3ins, John possessed a swerve and dummy more worthy of a half-back. He was used as a number 8 during the Lions tour, and once as a Wales international played as flanker. Of all his rugby abilities, John is best remembered for his strength in the line-out. John had a powerful standing leap and was reported to be able to leap up and grab onto a rugby crossbar, set at 10 ft 6ins above the ground.

=== International matches played ===
Wales

- England 1950, 1951, 1952, 1953, 1954
- France 1950, 1951, 1952, 1953
- Ireland 1950, 1951, 1952, 1953
- New Zealand 1953
- Scotland 1950, 1951, 1952, 1953
- South Africa 1951

British Lions

- Australia 1950, 1950
- New Zealand 1950, 1950, 1950, 1950

== Bibliography ==
- Billot, John (1974). Springboks in Wales. Ferndale: Ron Jones Publications.
- Godwin, Terry (1984). The International Rugby Championship 1883-1983. London: Willows Books. ISBN 0-00-218060-X.
- Smith, David; Williams, Gareth (1980). Fields of Praise: The Official History of The Welsh Rugby Union. Cardiff: University of Wales Press. ISBN 0-7083-0766-3.
- Thomas, Wayne (1979). A Century of Welsh Rugby Players. Ansells Ltd.
