= John Griffiths (curator) =

Welsh museum curator

John Griffiths (15 June 1952 – 9 April 2010) was a Welsh museum curator at the Science Museum in London, England.

Griffiths spent his childhood in the village of Ystradgynlais near Swansea in Powys, south Wales. He studied for a doctorate in astrophysics at University College London, working on a variable star in Cassiopeia and in infrared astronomy, receiving his PhD in 1977.

John Griffiths joined the London Science Museum in 1979. He was involved in several significant gallery projects and was a curator of space technology and modern production technology at the museum. In particular, he worked on the Space Exploration gallery that opened in 1986. From 1987 to 1991, he was Head of the Special Projects Group and during 1991 to 1995 he was responsible for the installation of a new collections management system as part of the LASSI consortium.

In 1995, Griffiths co-organised a meeting at the Science Museum on Museum Collections and the Information Superhighway in the early days of web development. In the late 1990s, Griffiths was the curator of the printing and protective clothing collections. He was also involved in creating content for the museum's website.

Griffiths left the Science Museum in 2003 and then taught astronomy at the Royal Greenwich Observatory. He lived for part of the time in El Bosque, Cádiz, southern Spain, where he set up the Griffon Educational Observatory with Andy Burns and Griffith's wife, Kathy.

Griffiths died in Spain, aged 57.
