= Morgan Morse =

Wales international rugby union player

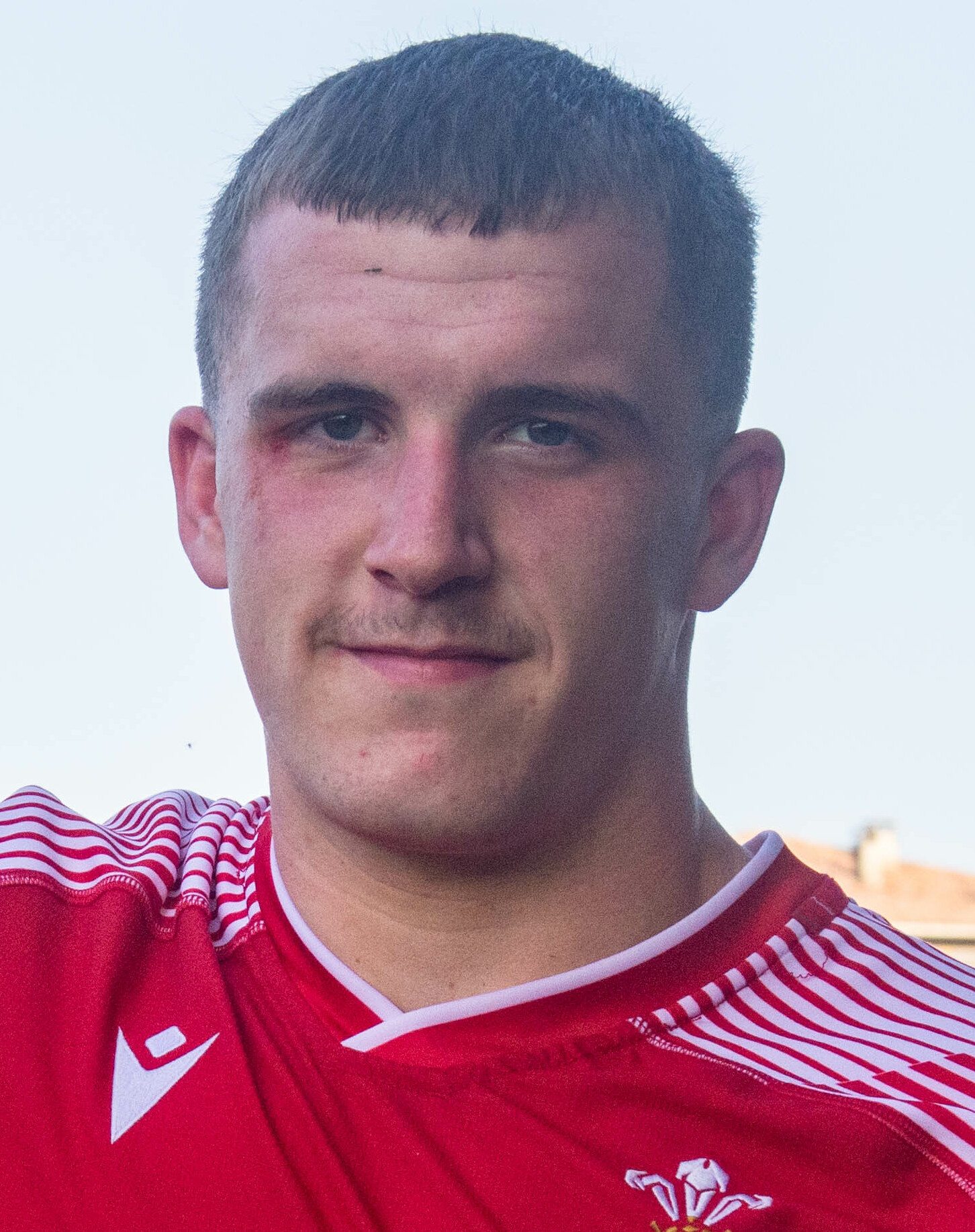
- Full name: Morgan Morse
- Born: 18 January 2005 (age 21) Swansea, Wales
- Height: 185 cm (6 ft 1 in)
- Weight: 106 kg (234 lb; 16 st 10 lb)
- School: Ysgol Gymraeg Ystalyfera Bro Dur

Rugby union career
- Position: Number 8
- Current team: Ospreys
Youth career
- 20??–2021: Cwmtwrch RFC
- 2021–2023: Ospreys
Senior career
Years	Team	Apps	(Points)
2023–2024	Swansea RFC	12	(15)
2023–	Ospreys	41	(45)
International career
Years	Team	Apps	(Points)
2021–2024	Wales U20	24	(30)
2025–	Wales	2	(0)

Morgan Morse (born 18 January 2005) is a Welsh rugby union player who plays for the Ospreys and Swansea RFC as a backrow.

== Club career ==
=== Ospreys ===
Morse began his career at Cwmtwrch RFC, featuring for West Wales under-14 and Ospreys West under-14. He joined the Ospreys Academy in 2021, while with the side he was dual-registered and featured for his home town of Swansea RFC in the Indigo Group Welsh Premiership. On the 3rd of November 2023 he made his debut for the Ospreys off the bench against the Sharks in the United Rugby Championship.

He scored a try against Cardiff in Round 9 of the 2023–24 United Rugby Championship, described as the "individual try of the season". At the end of the season, he signed an extension with the Ospreys.

On 15 December 2025, Morse signed another extension with the Ospreys, alongside fellow backrow Harri Deaves.

== International career ==
=== Wales U18 and U20 ===
He captained the Wales under-18 side, before playing for the Wales under-20 side at 17. He made his debut against Scotland scoring a try off the bench. Featuring at the U20 World Championship starting in all of Wales matches.

In 2024, Morse became the most capped player for Wales U20, with 24 appearances. He was left out of the squad for the 2025 Six Nations Under 20s Championship.

=== Wales ===
Morse was named in the Wales squad for the 2025 end-of-year rugby union internationals. He made his debut on 22 November 2025, off the bench against New Zealand after Aaron Wainwright was injured ahead of the match.
