= Ystradgynlais =

Town in Powys, Wales

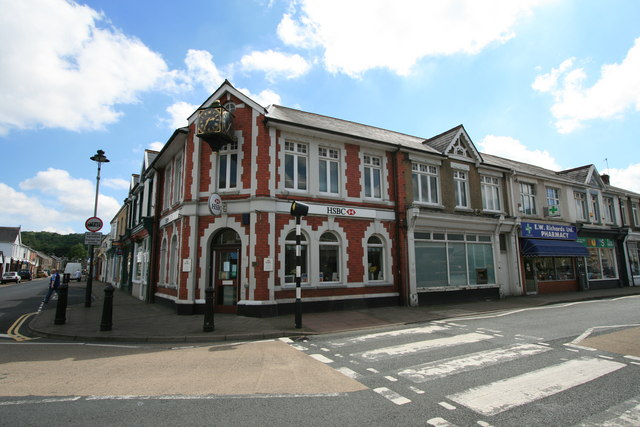
- Junction at Heol Eglwys

- Location within Powys
- Population: 8,092 (2011)
- OS grid reference: SN793106
- Community: Ystradgynlais
- Principal area: Powys
- Preserved county: Powys
- Country: Wales
- Sovereign state: United Kingdom
- Post town: Swansea
- Postcode district: SA9
- Dialling code: 01639
- Police: Dyfed-Powys
- Fire: Mid and West Wales
- Ambulance: Welsh
- UK Parliament: Brecon, Radnor and Cwm Tawe
- Senedd Cymru – Welsh Parliament: Brecon & Radnorshire
- List of places UK Wales Powys 51.78101°N 3.75107°W Community map: Map of the community

Ystradgynlais (English: /ˌʌstrədˈɡʌnlaɪs/; Welsh: [ˌəstradˈɡənlais]) is a town in southwest Powys, Wales. It is located on the River Tawe, and was within the boundaries of the former county of Brecknockshire. The town has a high proportion of Welsh language-speakers. The community includes Cwmtwrch, Abercraf and Cwmgiedd, with a population of 8,092 in the 2011 census; it is the second-largest town in Powys. It forms part of the Swansea Urban Area where the Ystradgynlais subdivision has a population of 10,248.

== History ==
The place-name Ystradgynlais, meaning 'vale of the river Cynlais' – Cynlais may be a personal name, or derive from cyn ('chisel') and glais ('stream') – is first recorded in 1372. In the 1600s there were only a couple of houses by the church and a pub (now the rectory). In 1801 there were only 993 residents in the town living in only 196 houses. The first documented written evidence of iron working in the area was at Ynyscedwyn and is of a deed of release dated 1729. By 1750 there were seven furnaces in south Wales, one of which was at Ynyscedwyn.

Tynycoed Chapel, located between Ynyswen and Penycae, near Ystradgynlais, was first constructed in 1774, and was rebuilt in 1829.

The first written evidence of coal mining in the area identified mining at Waunclawdd in 1780. Most of the coal dug up was used in the blast furnaces of the ironworks. By 1790, the full extent of the mineral resources in the valley was better known and it was realised that to exploit these to the full, improved transport would be essential.

The greatest increase in the population was between 1821 and 1841. This coincides with the coming of George Crane and the development of the Ynyscedwyn Ironworks. By 1870, the town's industrial development was in decline due to various economic factors, although coal mining carried on in the area with a few light industries.

In 1986 Ystradgynlais was made a community; the area was previously covered by the two communities of Ystradgynlais Higher and Ystradgynlais Lower.

== Culture ==
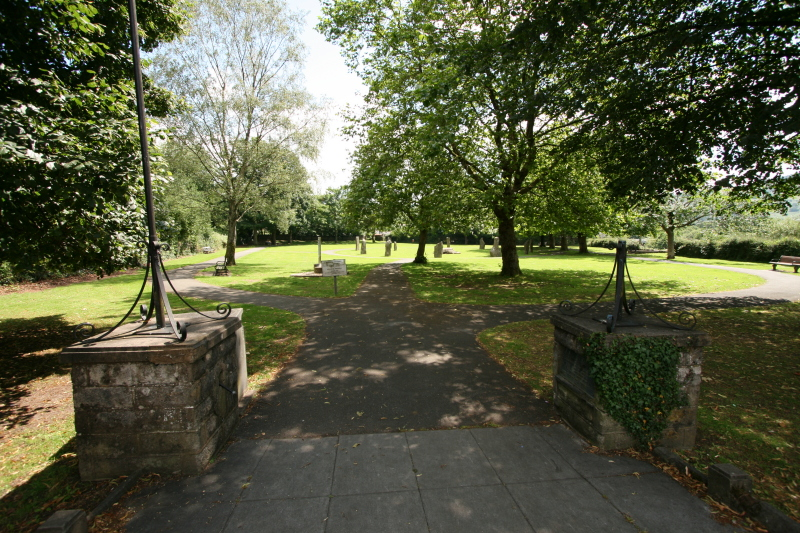
Parc yr Orsedd, Ystradgynlais

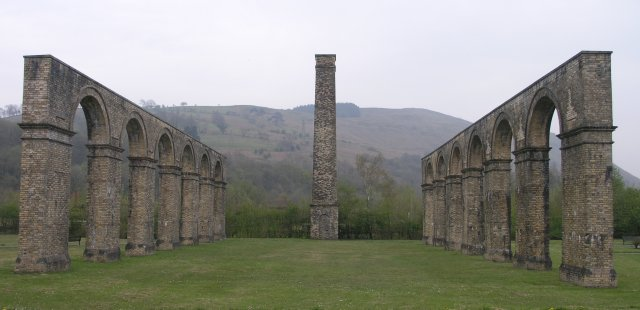
These remains were built in 1872 to house a planned steel mill. Although not completed, the site housed the Ynyscedwyn Tinplate Works

Ystradgynlais hosted the 1954 National Eisteddfod, an annual Welsh festival of literature, dance, and music. The century-old award-winning Ystradgynlais Public Band competed in the 2005 National Eisteddfod.

Ystradgynlais's Parc-yr-Orsedd has a monument to the fallen heroes of both World Wars from Ystradgynlais, Abercrave, Cwmtwrch, Cwmgiedd, Glyntawe and Coelbren.

Dan yr Ogof caves are a short journey from the town centre, passing Craig-y-Nos Castle and country park. The caves are reputed to have once been the hideout of folk figure Twm Siôn Cati. Henrhyd Falls are also nearby.

Ystradgynlais is also home to the Miners Welfare Hall, known and promoted as 'The Welfare', which contains a cinema. In 2020 a Purple Plaque was installed at the building to mark Eunice Stallard's life and activity as a peace campaigner.

It also has a number of public houses. For 11 years, from 1944, the town was the home of Polish artist Josef Herman, who stayed for the first four years in rooms at the Pen-y-Bont Inn. He became part of the community, where he was fondly nicknamed "Joe Bach" (Little Joe). Herman is quoted as saying: "I stayed here because I found ALL I required. I arrived a stranger for a fortnight. The fortnight became eleven years."

In 2016 The Stephen Lewis Tristars Aquathlon in Ystradgynlais won the Welsh triathlon event of the Year 2016.

== Transport ==
National Cycle Route 43 passes by the southern edge of the town on the line of the former Swansea Vale Railway which linked Swansea via the Neath and Brecon Railway at Coelbren with Brecon. Ystradgynlais railway station was operational from 1869 to 1923.

The A4067 road linking West Cross, Swansea, with Sennybridge ran through the town until the 1970s, when it was diverted onto the bypass that follows the line of the former Swansea Canal.

Ystradgynlais has a bus station, served hourly by the First Cymru-operated X6 to and from Swansea, as well as the long-distance TrawsCymru T6 between Swansea and Brecon.

== Sport ==
The town is the home of Ystradgynlais F.C. and Ystradgynlais RFC. Ystradgynlais RFC was established in 1890 and has a fierce rivalry with Ystalyfera RFC and Abercrave RFC.

== Watchmaking ==
In 1946, Smiths Industries Ltd, Ingersoll Ltd and Vickers Armstrong founded the Anglo-Celtic Watch Co. Ltd. producing watches on the Ynyscedwyn estate on the outskirts of Ystradgynlais. The factory was officially opened by Hugh Dalton on 15 March 1947. Vickers Armstrong sold their shares to the other two companies in 1948. The company became one of the largest producers of watches in Europe, producing up to 1.25 million watches a year until 1980 when it closed.

== Notable people ==
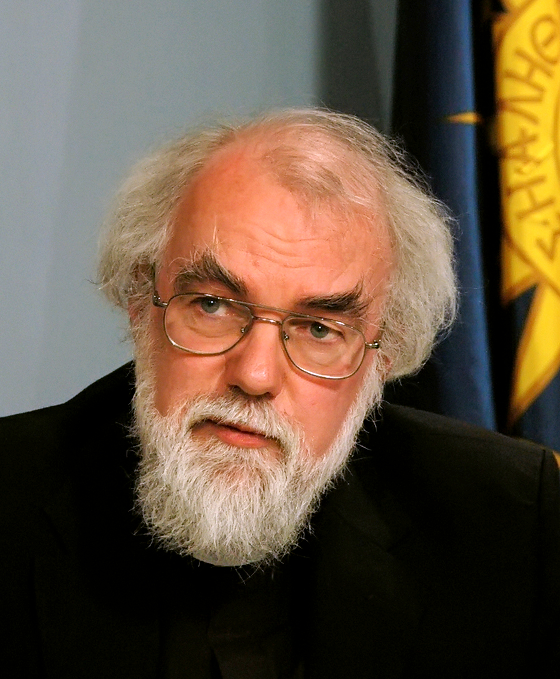
Rowan Williams, 2007

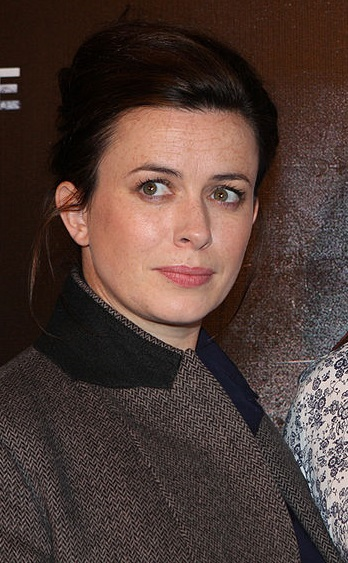
Eve Myles, 2013

- Thomas Levi (1825–1916), Calvinistic Methodist minister
- Adelina Patti (1843–1919), opera singer, retired to nearby Craig-y-Nos Castle
- Daniel Protheroe (1866–1934), composer and conductor
- John Henry Williams (1887–1980), American economist
- Tudor Thomas (1893–1976), physician, an ophthalmic surgeon, pioneered corneal grafting
- Josef Herman (1911–2000), Polish painter, spent 11 years living and painting in Ystradgynlais
- Goronwy Daniel (1914–2003), academic and senior statistical civil servant
- Menna Gallie (1919–1990), novelist and translator
- John Howard Purnell (1925–1996), former president of the Royal Society of Chemistry
- Caerwyn Roderick (1927–2011), politician and MP for Brecon and Radnorshire
- T. Geoffrey Flynn (born 1937) Canadian biochemist.
- Julian Hopkin (born c. 1948), physician, researcher and medical teacher.
- Rowan Williams (born 1950), the Archbishop of Canterbury from 2002 to 2012, grew up in Ystradgynlais
- John Griffiths (1952–2010), museum curator at the Science Museum, London
- Ben Gunn (born 1965), prison reform campaigner
- Steven Meo (born 1977), TV actor
- Eve Myles (born 1978), TV and theatre actor

=== Sport ===
- Ronnie Rees (born 1944–2023), footballer with over 430 club caps and 39 for Wales
- Anthony Buchanan (born 1955), former rugby union prop forward with 238 caps with Llanelli RFC and 5 with Wales
- Huw Richards (born 1960), former rugby union player for Neath RFC and Wales
- Steve Bayliss (born 1960), former rugby union and professional rugby league footballer with 93 club caps
- Kevin Hopkins (born 1961), retired Welsh international rugby union player
