= Mel De Lloyd =

Wales international rugby league & union footballer

Melville De Lloyd
Personal information
- Full name: Melville De Lloyd
- Born: 2 April 1917 Resolven, Wales
- Died: May 1985 (aged 68) Margate, Kent

Playing information

Rugby union
Club
Years	Team	Pld	T	G	FG	P
≤1936–≤36	Resolven RFC
≤1936–36	Llanelli RFC
	Total	0	0	0	0	0

Rugby league
- Position: Stand-off
Club
Years	Team	Pld	T	G	FG	P
1936–47	Warrington	176	27	7	27	140
1941	→ Wakefield Trinity (guest)	9	0	3	0	6
≤1942–≥43	→ Keighley (guest)	86	13	95	0	229
1947–52	Keighley	100	15	30	0	105
	Total	371	55	135	27	480
Representative
Years	Team	Pld	T	G	FG	P
1945	Wales	1

Melville De Lloyd (2 April 1917 – May 1985) was a Welsh rugby union, and professional rugby league footballer who played in the 1930s, 1940s and 1950s. He played club level rugby union (RU) for Resolven RFC and Llanelli RFC, and representative level rugby league (RL) for Wales, and at club level for Warrington, Wakefield Trinity, and Keighley, as a stand-off.

== Background ==
De Lloyd was born in Resolven, Wales, and he died aged 68 in Margate, Kent.

== Playing career ==
=== International honours ===
De Lloyd won a cap for Wales (RL) while at Warrington in 1945.

=== Club career ===
De Lloyd began his rugby union career playing alongside his brothers at Resolven RFC, aged 17 he then played alongside Bill Clement for Llanelli RFC, he was spotted by Eddie Waring, and was recommended to rugby league club Warrington, he made his début for Warrington on Saturday 26 September 1936, he played stand-off in Warrington's 8-4 victory over Barrow in the 1937 Lancashire Cup Final during the 1936–37 season at Central Park, Wigan on Saturday 23 October 1937.

During World War II he appeared as a guest player for Wakefield Trinity making his début for during March 1941, playing 9-matches up to May 1941, he also he appeared as a guest player for Keighley, during a game against Hull F.C. on Saturday 3 January 1942 he was sent off after disputing a decision by the referee, Mr L. Dolby, alleged that De Lloyd had later "struck him". On Wednesday 7 January 1942, the Rugby Football League disciplinary committee suspended De Lloyd indefinitely (sine die).

The suspension was lifted 10-months later in October 1942, he resumed playing having missed 14-games, he scored 1-try, 3-conversions, and 3-drop goals for a total of 15-points in the 21-0 victory over Huddersfield in the first leg of the 1943 Yorkshire Cup semi-final during the 1943–44 season at Lawkholme Lane on Saturday 13 November 1943, during his time at Keighley they appeared in two Yorkshire Cup finals, the only Yorkshire Cup finals that Keighley have appeared in, the 7-10 aggregate defeat (2-5 at Odsal Stadium on Saturday 27 November 1943, and 5-5 at Lawkholme Lane on Saturday 4 December 1943) to Bradford Northern in the 1943 Yorkshire Cup Final during the 1943–44 season, and the 3-17 defeat by Wakefield Trinity in the 1951 Yorkshire Cup Final during the 1951–52 season at Fartown Ground, Huddersfield on Saturday 27 October 1951, after the war he resumed playing for Warrington, playing his last game for them on Saturday 11 October 1947, he then signed for Keighley in 1947, eventually retiring from playing in 1952.

He appears to have scored no drop-goals (or field-goals as they are currently known in Australasia) for Wakefield Trinity, nor Keighley, but prior to the 1974–75 season all goals, whether; conversions, penalties, or drop-goals, scored 2-points, consequently prior to this date drop-goals were often not explicitly documented, therefore '0' drop-goals may indicate drop-goals not recorded, rather than no drop-goals scored. In addition, prior to the 1949–50 season, the archaic field-goal was also still a valid means of scoring points.
