= David Jenkins (rugby, born 1904) =

GB rugby league & Wales international rugby union footballer

- Born: David Rees Jenkins; 12 April 1904 Resolven, Wales
- Died: 13 August 1951 (aged 47) Whitley Bay, England

Rugby union career
- Position: Prop
Amateur team(s)
Years	Team	Apps	(Points)
- Resolven RFC
- Neath RFC
1924–1929	Swansea RFC		
International career
Years	Team	Apps	(Points)
1927–1929	Wales	2	(0)
- Rugby league career

Playing information
- Position: Forward
Club
Years	Team	Pld	T	G	FG	P
1929–	Leeds RLFC

David Rees Jenkins (12 April 1904 – 13 August 1951) was a Welsh dual-code international rugby footballer who played rugby union for Swansea and rugby league for Leeds RLFC, and representing internationally in both sports.

== Rugby career ==
Jenkins joined Swansea from Neath in 1924 and, while with Swansea, faced two touring international teams. In 1927 he played against the New Zealand Maori rugby union team, and then in 1927 the New South Wales Waratahs. Jenkins gained his first cap for Wales team when he was selected to face the Waratahs again in their 1927 tour. Jenkins's only other Welsh union cap was in the 1929 Five Nations Championship when he was chosen to face England on 19 January. Under the captaincy of Ivor Jones, Wales lost their eighth consecutive game at Twickenham with the final score 8–3 to England. Jenkins may have gained further caps but when the next Welsh game was played on 2 February 1929, Jenkins was playing rugby league for Leeds RLFC, having switched codes for £370.

== International matches played ==
Wales

- England 1929
- (Australia) New South Wales Waratahs 1927

== Bibliography ==
- Goodwin, Terry (1984). The International Rugby Championship 1883-1983. London: Willows Books. ISBN 0-00-218060-X.
- Smith, David; Williams, Gareth (1980). Fields of Praise: The Official History of The Welsh Rugby Union. Cardiff: University of Wales Press. ISBN 0-7083-0766-3.
