= Swansea urban area =

Urban area in Wales

Coordinates: 51.635°N 3.851°W

The Swansea Urban Area or Swansea Built-up Area is an area of land in south Wales, defined by the Office for National Statistics for population monitoring purposes. It is an urban conurbation and is not coterminous with the City and County of Swansea. It consists of the urban area centred on Swansea city centre; the Swansea Valley including Clydach, Ystradgynlais and Pontardawe; and includes Neath and Port Talbot which are outside the county boundaries, but excludes the urban area of Gorseinon within the county boundaries.

The total population of the area in 2011 was 300,352 making it the 3rd largest in Wales, the 24th largest conurbation in England and Wales and the 27th largest in the United Kingdom. This was an increase of 11% from the 2001 figure of 270,506. Most of the increase was due to Ystradgynlais, Gowerton, Upper Killay and Glais becoming part of the urban area.

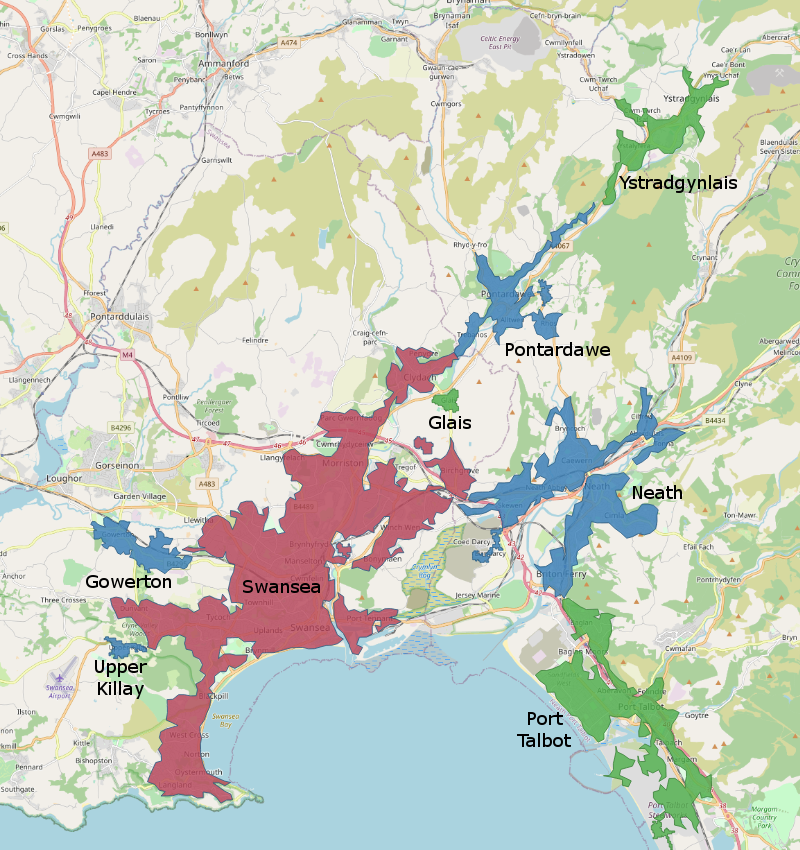
Map of the Swansea Urban Area with Subdivisions

== Subdivisions ==
The ONS provides sub-division statistics for the Swansea Urban Area

Rank	Urban sub-area name	Population (2001 census)	Population (2011 census)
1	Swansea	169,880	179,485
2	Neath	45,898	50,658
3	Port Talbot	35,633	37,276
4	Pontardawe/Clydach	19,095	12,333
5	Ystradgynlais		10,248
6	Gowerton		8,183
7	Upper Killay		1,331
8	Glais		838

Notes:

- Gowerton was included under the Swansea subdivision for the 2001 census.
- Ystradgynlais was not part of the Swansea urban area until the 2011 census

== See also ==
- List of conurbations in the United Kingdom
