= Tom Hopkins (rugby union) =

- Full name: Thomas Hopkins
- Born: 20 January 1903 Ystradgynlais, Wales
- Died: 26 January 1980 (aged 77) Ystradgynlais, Wales

Rugby union career
- Position: Forward
International career
Years	Team	Apps	(Points)
1926	Wales	4	(3)

Thomas Hopkins (20 January 1903 – 26 January 1980) was a Welsh international rugby union player.

Hopkins hailed from Ystradgynlais in the Swansea Valley and was originally a colliery worker.

A Swansea forward, Hopkins drew comparisons to ex–player Jehoida Hodges, but had a short international career. He gained his Wales selection during his first season with Swansea and made all four of his appearances in the 1926 Five Nations, after debuting in the tournament opener against England at Cardiff.

Hopkins was the grandfather of 1980s Wales centre Kevin Hopkins.

== See also ==
- List of Wales national rugby union players
