= Roddy Evans =

British Lions & Wales international rugby union player (1934-2016)

- Born: William Roderick Evans; 19 December 1934
- Died: 6 November 2016 (aged 81)

Rugby union career
- Position: Lock
Amateur team(s)
Years	Team	Apps	(Points)
- Porthcawl RFC
–	Cambridge University R.U.F.C.		
–	Bridgend RFC		
–	Cardiff RFC		
–	Barbarian F.C.		
International career
Years	Team	Apps	(Points)
1958-1962	Wales	13	(0)
1959	British Lions	4	(0)

William Roderick "Roddy" Evans (19 December 1934 – 6 November 2016) was a Welsh international rugby union lock who played club rugby for Cardiff and Bridgend. He was awarded thirteen caps for Wales and toured on the 1959 British Lions tour to Australia and New Zealand. He died in November 2016 at the age of 81.

== International matches played ==
Wales

- Australia 1958
- England 1958, 1961, 1962
- France 1958, 1961
- Ireland 1958, 1961, 1962
- Scotland 1958, 1961, 1962
- South Africa 1960

== Bibliography ==
- Smith, David; Williams, Gareth (1980). Fields of Praise: The Official History of The Welsh Rugby Union. Cardiff: University of Wales Press. ISBN 0-7083-0766-3.
- Thomas, Wayne (1979). A Century of Welsh Rugby Players. Ansells Ltd.
