= Porthcawl RFC =

Welsh rugby union club, based in Porthcawl

(Wales) Porthcawl RFC
- Full name: Porthcawl Rugby Football Club
- Nickname(s): Seaweeds, The Gulls, Sky Rats, SHEgulls (Women's team)
- Founded: 1880; 146 years ago
- Location: Porthcawl, Wales
- Ground: South Road Ground
- League: WRU Division 2 West Central
Team kit

Official website
- www.porthcawlrfc.com

Porthcawl Rugby Football Club is a Welsh rugby union team based in Porthcawl, Wales. The club is a member of the Welsh Rugby Union and is a feeder club for the Ospreys.

Porthcawl presently field a First XV team, Second XV, Women's XV, Youth XV, Juniors - Under 14, Under 13, Under 12 and Minis Section.

== History ==
The club was founded in 1880 and became a full member club of the WRU shortly after. There have been a number of homes including playing on a field that was behind the Brogden public house, a clubhouse and pitches at West Winds off Locks Lane and its current venue at South Road which they moved into in 1970. The clubhouse was extended in 1980.

Throughout its history the Seaweeds have competed strongly in the Glamorgan area and although classified as a second class WRU club has competed well in the WRU Cup competitions against many so called 1st class clubs including the likes of Neath, Aberavon, South Wales Police and Ebbw Vale.

One of its proudest moments came in 1972 when the club faced and beat Maesteg, one of the first "giant killing" games and even led to a reference of the game by Max Boyce on his Live At Treorchy album.

In 1974 the club became one of the first WRU affiliated clubs to venture on a major overseas tour when they travelled to Canada. They have returned on 4 further occasions and have also enjoyed many tours to France, Spain and across the U.K. As hosts Porthcawl RFC have welcomed many teams from all parts of the world including Argentina, US, Canada, South Africa, Australia and New Zealand.

During the club's centenary season in 1980/81, they played a series of floodlit matches most weeks including games against a Clive Williams International XV, Glamorgan County, Captain Crawshays and many first class clubs.

Possibly the clubs finest hour was the triumph that came in the Principality Stadium on 29 April 2018, when the team won the WRU Bowl competition at the Principality Stadium thanks to a final penalty kick. 11 bus loads of supporters left the rugby club for the game together with many others from pubs in the town.

That year, the club still had to complete its season and the cup triumph was soon followed by League success to gain promotion to WRU League 2 West Central.

Many first class players have been produced by the Seaweeds benefitting, in particular, the likes of Aberavon, Maesteg, Bridgend, Neath and Swansea.

Recently the club has enjoyed a renaissance with the selection of the youngest ever Welsh international player in Tom Prydie and Ryan Bevington, son of club stalwart Richard, being selected as part of the 2011 Wales World Cup Squad. Also with that squad was home produced senior analyst Rhys Long.

== Notable former players ==
- Clive Williams Wales and the British Lions
- Tom Prydie Wales
- Ryan Bevington Wales
- Roddy Evans Wales and British Lions
- Roger Michaelson Wales
- Dafydd Jenkins Wales
