= Allen McCarley =

- Born: 5 December 1914 Port Talbot, Wales
- Died: 25 July 1963 (aged 48) Port Talbot, Wales

Rugby union career
- Position: Wing-forward
International career
Years	Team	Apps	(Points)
1938	Wales	3	(9)

Allen McCarley (5 December 1914 — 25 July 1963) was a Welsh international rugby union player.

McCarley was born in Port Talbot, where he attended Central School.

An Aberavon wing-forward, McCarley gained three Wales caps in the 1938 Home Nations. He scored try on debut against England at Cardiff, dodging past fullback Hubert Freakes and then outpacing several backs in a 30-yard sprint, helping Wales secure a 14–8 win. His next match against Scotland at Murrayfield brought him another two tries, this time in a losing cause. He continued to play for Aberavon after the war.

== See also ==
- List of Wales national rugby union players
