= Kevin Hopkins =

Wales International rugby union player

- Born: Kevin Hopkins; 29 September 1961 (age 65) Cwmllynfell, Wales
- Height: 5 ft 10 in (1.78 m)
- Weight: 76 kg (12 st 0 lb)
- School: Maesydderwen Comprehensive School
- University: South Glamorgan Institute of Higher Education

Rugby union career
- Position: Centre
International career
Years	Team	Apps	(Points)
1985-1987	Wales	7	(0)

Kevin Hopkins (born 29 September 1961) is a retired Welsh International rugby union player. He made seven appearances for his country, as well as representing Cardiff RFC, Swansea RFC and Neath RFC in the top division of Welsh club rugby, and played twice for the Barbarians invitational side. Following his retirement from playing, Hopkins has held numerous coaching positions.

His grandfather, Tom Hopkins, was also a Wales international rugby player.

== Club career ==
Hopkins started his playing career with his home town club Ystradgynlais RFC before going on to represent the first class teams Cardiff RFC, Swansea RFC and Neath RFC. He was club captain for Swansea during the 1991–92 season when they won their first Welsh league title.

== International career ==
Hopkins made his international test début in April 1985, against England in Cardiff during the 1985 Five Nations Championship. Hopkins' next international appearance came in the 1987 Five Nations championship, where he played in the matches against France, England and Scotland. Hopkins was a member of the Wales squad for the 1987 Rugby World Cup and played in the pool game matches against Tonga and Canada. His final appearance for Wales was in their match against the United States during the US's 1987 tour of the country.

== Coaching career ==
Hopkins was appointed Director of Rugby for the Ospreys regional team in September 2006. The position was discontinued two seasons later and Hopkins opted in May 2008 not to take an alternative role at the region.

Hopkins took up a post at Pembrokeshire College as their sports academy coaching co-ordinator in August 2009. In 2010, Hopkins was appointed backs coach at Dings Crusaders.
