= Ynyscedwyn Ironworks =

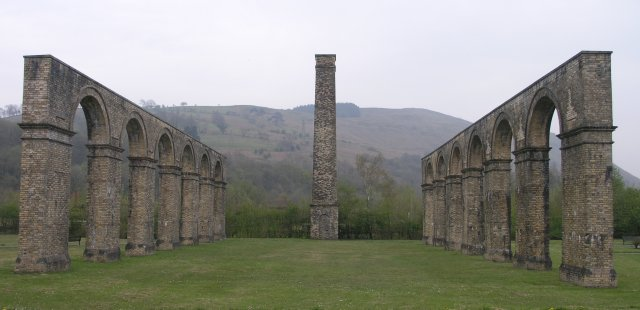
- Remains of the unfinished structures at Ynyscedwyn Ironworks, begun in 1872
- Established: 1612 (414 years ago)
- Dissolved: 1978
- Types: ironworks
- Coordinates: 51°46′06″N 3°45′51″W

Ynyscedwyn Ironworks is an industrial complex located in Ystradgynlais, near Swansea, Wales. Smelting was first established here in seventeenth century. In the 1820s, with the arrival of George Crane, production was expanded. Crane was the first ironmaster who successfully tried anthracite to a blast furnace in 1837.

In 1837, London bankers, Charles Price and Joseph Marryat, invested in the Ynyscedwyn Ironworks.

The remaining structures were built in 1872 to house a planned steel mill. Although not completed, the site housed the Ynyscedwyn Tinplate Works.

== Bibliography ==
- Hyde, Charles K. (1977), Technological Change and the British iron industry, 1700–1870, Princeton: Princeton University Press, ISBN 0-691-05246-8
