= Fred Morgan (footballer) =

Australian rules footballer

Personal information
- Full name: Frederick Herbert Morgan
- Born: 29 October 1891; Richmond, Victoria
- Died: 10 March 1966 (aged 74); Hughesdale, Victoria

Playing career^{1}
Years	Club	Games (Goals)
1913–15	Richmond	31 (2)
- ^{1} Playing statistics correct to the end of 1915.

Frederick Herbert Morgan (29 October 1891 – 10 March 1966) was an Australian rules footballer who played with Richmond in the Victorian Football League (VFL).
