= Crynant RFC =

Welsh rugby union club, based in Crynant

(Wales) Crynant RFC
- Full name: Crynant Rugby Football Club
- Nickname: Foxes
- Founded: 1898
- Location: Crynant, Wales
- President: John Davies
- League: WRU Division 3 West Central B
- 2015-16: 1st
Team kit

Official website
- crynant.rfc.wales

Crynant Rugby Football Club is a Welsh rugby union team. It is based in Crynant. The club is a member of the Welsh Rugby Union and is a feeder club for the Ospreys.

== History ==
Crynant RFC was founded in 1898. They played their first recorded game on Christmas Day against Ystradgynlais. The great religious revival of 1904 spread throughout South Wales led by lay preacher Evan Roberts. Like many teams in South Wales, players who quit rugby to follow a more godly code resulted in the eventual dissolution of the club in 1904. The club reformed in 1908 playing games at Maesmawr field, using the Red Lion Hotel as a clubhouse. In 1912 Crynant RFC joined the Swansea and District League and moved its clubhouse to the Star Hotel where they remained until the 1960s. At the outbreak of World War I club rugby in Wales ceased and the club once again disbanded.

=== 1919-1960 ===
After the First World War, Crynant RFC reformed and joined the Neath and District League. They were champions five times between 1922 and 1926. In 1928 the club gained membership to the Welsh Rugby Union. One of the club's proudest moments came in 1939 when former player Cyril Challinor, now playing for Neath, was chosen to represent Wales against England. Wales lost and Cyril was dropped from the national squad. The club disbanded for a third time in 1939 with the outbreak of World War II. The team reformed after the war. During the 1940s a second team formed in Crynant: the Crynant Harlequins. The two clubs merged in May 1950. In 1956 the club gained a new pitch adjacent to Maesmawr field and soon after gained ownership of an old shop and billiard hall that was converted into the club's first permanent clubhouse.

During the 1950s Crynant saw two more former players capped for Wales, Roy John and C.C. Meredith. They were picked to play for Wales, while members of Neath RFC.

=== 1961 - present ===
Though Crynant saw little success during the sixties, in 1967 Ron Jones was selected to face England, while playing for Coventry. He represented Wales four times between 1967 and 1968. The 1968/69 season saw the introduction of a youth side, which would allow the growth of local talent to help strengthen future senior teams.

In 1971, Crynant's secretary since 1927, Rhys Emlyn Williams, was elected to the post of Welsh Rugby Union President coinciding with the club's upturn in fortunes. In the late 1960's the formation of a Youth Side and the extension of the clubhouse meant far more social events and very often two games at home on a Saturday. During the 70's on the playing field the club reached three West Wales Cup finals, triumphing in one in 1979. Crynant produced a dozen Youth & Schools Internationals during this period and the advent of the local O.G.Davies competitions meant further successes. However, the 1972-73 season proved to be exceptional, with the winning of the West Wales Championship & The President's Cup. A year later, the history books were nearly re-written when visitors Llanelli scraped a 14-9 win in an epic Welsh Cup game, Cryant coming desperately close to a try in the dying minutes.

In 1983 the clubhouse was badly damaged by fire. The damage was extensive and the club was under insured; it took until 2003 for the club to pay back the debts to repair the damage. During the club's centenary season in 1995/96, they were visited by top Welsh clubs as part of the celebrations, including Llanelli, Neath, and Swansea.

== Club badge ==
The emblem of Crynant Rugby Club includes a picture of a white horse that is believed to relate to the mountain of March Hywel that overlooks the village. The horse is Hywel's Horse, which is linked to an ancient battle that took place on the mountain between local tribes. The badge also contains a picture of a star that represents the original clubhouse of Crynant RFC, the Star Hotel. On the opposite side is a picture of an M with two circles placed over the points of the M. To this day nobody within the village is able to determine what this symbol means and since the designer of the badge is no longer alive, the final symbolism is lost. The Club's motto is Digon yw Chwarae (it is enough to play). Sadly, with the advent of professionalism, this attitude to the game has all but disappeared.

== Notable former players ==
See also Category:Crynant RFC players

- (Wales) Mark Bennett (3 caps)
- (Wales) Cyril Challinor (1 cap)
- (Wales) Roy John (19 caps)
- (Wales) Ron Jones (5 caps)
- (Wales) Courtney Meredith (14 caps)
