= Cwmtwrch RFC =

(Wales) Cwmtwrch RFC
- Full name: Cwmtwrch Rugby Football Club
- Nickname: UppaCwm
- Founded: 1890
- Location: Cwmtwrch, Wales
- Ground: Glyncynwal Park
- Chairman: Thomas Addey
- Coach: Owen Phillips
- League: WRU West Central 5

Official website
- cwmtwrch.rfc.wales

Cwmtwrch Rugby Football Club (Welsh: Clwb Rygbi Cwmtwrch) is a Welsh rugby union team officially founded in 1890. The team colours are black and white. Their home ground is Glyncynwal Park View, Cwmtwrch. Cwmtwrch currently have a Senior XV who play in the WRU West Central 5 league and is a feeder club for the Ospreys.

The first team has over 40 active squad members. The coaching team currently consists of Owen Phillips (Head Coach), Zac Beynon (Backs Coach) Jonathan Williams (Forwards Coach) Jordan Hopkins (Skills & Attack Coach) Will Davies (Set Piece Coach) Jack Jarrett & Dafydd Lougher (Senior Team Managers).

Cwmtwrch have produced promising players like Jac Morgan, Morgan Morse and Llien Morgan.

== 1880-1914 ==
In 1890 an official Cwmtwrch team took the field for the first time; though it is presumed that rugby had been played in the town before this. The first ground for Cwmtwrch RFC, Glyncawl Park View, is the pitch the team still plays on today, since returning there after the Second World War.

The club's first captain was not recorded until 1903 when D.Davies held the position.

In 1909 Cwmtwrch RFC merged with neighbouring club, Cwmllynfell.

== Notable former players ==
- (Wales) Howell Lewis (4 caps)
- (Wales) Tudor Williams (1 cap)
- (Wales) Albert Owen (1 cap)
- (Wales) Clive Rowlands (1 cap)
- (Wales) Jac Morgan (24 caps) Welsh Rugby Union’s current captain
- (Wales) Morgan Morse (1 cap)
- (Wales) Llien Morgan
