= Birchgrove RFC =

Rugby team from Birchgrove, Wales

(Wales) Birchgrove RFC
- Full name: Birchgrove Rugby Football Club
- Nickname(s): Robins, Grove
- Founded: 1990
- Location: Birchgrove, Wales
- Ground(s): Parc Bedw
- Chairman: Jeff Hills
- Coach(es): Robert Di’lulio Liam Gadd
- League(s): WRU Division One West Central
- 2019-20: 2nd
Team kit

Official website
- www.pitchero.com/clubs/birchgroverfc/

Birchgrove Rugby Football Club is a rugby union team from the village of Birchgrove in Swansea, Wales. The club is a member of the Welsh Rugby Union and is a feeder club for the Ospreys.

Birchgrove RFC fields a senior and youth team that often combine as a senior team.

== Club honours ==
- WRU Division Four South West 2009/10 - Champions

== Youth Rugby ==
Birchgrove RFC Youth Team reformed in the 2012–13 season with former First Team player Conrad Beynon coaching. They are currently playing in WRU Osprey OE League. Their captain is scrum half Leigh Di'Iulio.
