= Ystradgynlais RFC =

Welsh rugby union club, based in Ystradgynlais

(Wales) Ystradgynlais RFC
- Full name: Ystradgynlais Rugby Football Club
- Nickname: The Blues
- Founded: 1890; 136 years ago
- Location: Ystradgynlais, Wales
- Ground: Recreation Ground (Capacity: 5,000)
- Chairman: Tristan Davies
- President: Glyn Rees
- Coach: Steffan James
- Captain: Curtis Davies/Emyr Lawrence
- League: WRU Division 1 West
- 2014/15 league champions, West Wales champions, Welsh bowl champions. Unbeaten season. 31/31: 1st
Team kit

Official website
- www.pitchero.com/clubs/ystradgynlais

Ystradgynlais Rugby Football Club is a Welsh rugby union club based in Ystradgynlais, Wales. The club is a member of the Welsh Rugby Union and is also a feeder club for the Ospreys.

The club was established in 1890.

== Club honours ==
- West Wales Cup Champions (1938)
- Swansea Valley Cup (13 Occasions)
- Promotion to Heineken League (1991)
- Promotion from Division 3 (1993)
- Cwmtawe 7s Champions (1994)
- Division 2 Champions (1995)
- Promotion from Division 5 South West (2008)
- West Wales Plate Champions (2008)

== Former notable players ==
- Joe Jones (Wales)
- Steve Bayliss (Wales (RL))
- Anthony Buchanan(Wales)
- Jonny Koloi (Tonga)
- Kevin Hopkins (Wales)
- Tom Hopkins (Wales)
- Stan Wright (Cook Islands)
- Vernon Cooper (Wales)
- Albert Owen (Wales)
- Mark Bennett (Wales)
- David Lewis (Wales B)
- Ogwyn Alexander (Wales B)
- (Wales) William Lewis Thomas (Final Welsh Trialist)
- Ness Flowers (Wales (RL))
- Dan Baker (Wales)

== Memorable Results ==
- Ystradgynlais 6 Pontarddulais 3 (West Wales Cup Final 1938)
- Ystradgynlais 6 Llanelli 6 (Welsh Cup 1978)
- Ystradgynlais 9 Garndiffaith 8 (Play Off 1991)
- Ystradgynlais 16 Pontypridd 15 (Centenary Game 1991)
- Ystradgynlais 10 Newport 9 (Welsh Cup 1994)
- Ystradgynlais 52 Cefneithin 10 (West Wales Plate Final 2008)
