= Abercrave RFC =

Welsh rugby union club, based in Abercraf

(Wales) Abercrave RFC
- Full name: Abercrave Rugby Football Club
- Founded: 2 Nov 1894; 131 years ago
- Location: Abercraf, Wales
- Ground: Plas-y-Ddol
- President: Darryl Williams
- League: WRU Division Two West Central
- 2019/2020: 6th
Team kit

Official website
- abercrave.rfc.wales

Abercrave Rugby Football Club (Welsh: Clwb Rygbi Abercraf) is a Welsh rugby union team from Abercraf, which was founded in 1894. Abercrave currently have a Senior XV who play in the WRU Division Five South West league and is a feeder club for the Ospreys.

Abercrave RFC host several teams, and as well as the Senior XV, have a Second XV, Youth team and multiple junior sections.

== Club history ==
Founded in 1894, the founding team that would become Abercrave RFC began playing on a field opposite the local church. The first team switched pitches several times before settling on a field behind the Lamb and Flag Inn. As with the majority of village teams in Wales, the club disbanded during the First World War, but reformed in 1919, using the Red Lion Inn as their unofficial headquarters. The club playing field changed again, and until 1945 the team played on grounds beside the River Tawe. The team finally settled at the Plas-y-Ddol in 1958, which has been the club's main ground to the present day.

== Club honours ==
- 2024/25 WRU Division Two West Central - Promoted as Runners Up
- 2023/24 WRU Division Three West Central - Champions
- 2008/09 WRU Division Five South West - Champions
- 2024/25 West Wales Bowl - Champions
- 2023/24 West Wales Plate - Champions

== Notable former players ==
- (Wales) Alun Donovan
- (Wales) Ness Flowers
- (Wales) Adam Jones
- (Wales) Eddie Morgan
- (Wales) Huw Richards
- (Wales) Clive Rowlands
- (Wales) Dafydd Howells
