= Fred Morgan (rugby union) =

Wales international rugby union player

- Full name: Frederick Luther Morgan
- Born: 11 February 1915 Pontyberem, Wales
- Died: 29 December 1988 (aged 73) Llanelli, Wales
- Occupation: Policeman

Rugby union career
- Position: Lock
International career
| Years | Team | Apps | (Points) |
| 1938–39 | Wales | 4 | (0) |

Frederick Luther Morgan (11 February 1915 — 29 December 1988) was a Welsh international rugby union player.

Born in Pontyberem, Morgan was a nephew of 1920s Wales prop Tom Jones.

Morgan, a policeman, played for Llanelli and was capped four times for Wales as a second-row forward. He played all three of Wales' 1938 Home Nations matches, then got demoted to the Possibles in the next season's trials, but was able force his way into the XV for their opening Home Nations fixture at Twickenham.

== See also ==
- List of Wales national rugby union players
