= 2003–04 Ystalyfera RFC season =

The most important event of the 2003/04 Ystalyfera RFC season was the creation of Regional Rugby in 2003, which resulted in a major restructuring of the National League. For Ystalyfera this meant re-classification into Division Three South West.

Opponents by design were now not too far away in comparison to previous years, Ystalyfera would campaign a relegation battle with Skewen, Seven Sisters, Ystradgynlais and Trebanos, the latter two losing out finishing below the ‘Fera at the end of the season.

Cup exits were again early except for the Welsh Cup. A 1st Round bye was followed by a 2nd Round victory over Taibach 30-19. The 3rd round was a big exit from the event 0-55 away at Bridgend Athletic.

At the time of the first encounter with Ystrad’ on 27 December, the league position was three wins and eight defeats. A 12-3 win with tries from Ashley Carter and Graham Jones, a conversion by Gareth James and sin bins for Neil Lynch and Arwel Williams, stood as the only victory until the next encounter between the sides, when ‘Fera won on 6 March 2004 23-5 at Ynysydarren. Scorers in this second encounter were Ashley Carter one try, Dai Thomas a try, Damian James two conversions and three penalties. Now becoming a regular habit wins in the last two games ensured safety for another season.

Top scorer was Damian James with a personal record of 220 points, he also scored 13 tries, one more than Ashley Carter. Captain this season was Martyn Stoneman. Players Player was Mark Rewston and Supporters Player hooker Tristian Davies.

== National League Division 3 South West ==
Pos.	Team.	PL.	W.	D.	L.	F.	A.	Bal.	Try.	Pts.	%.
1 P	Banwen	26	25	0	1	893	330	+563	121	75	96.15%
2 P	Mumbles	26	22	0	4	886	356	+530	116	66	84.62%
3	Maesteg Harlequins	26	19	1	6	647	367	+280	91	58	75.00%
4	Bryncoch	26	19	1	6	631	403	+228	80	58	75.00%
5	Kenfig Hill	26	16	0	10	637	508	+129	71	48	61.54%
6	Nantyffyllon	26	15	1	10	573	442	+131	78	46	59.62%
7	Glynneath	26	13	1	12	575	481	+94	75	40	51.92%
8	Brynamman	26	10	0	16	402	569	-167	49	30	38.46%
9	Ammanford	26	9	0	17	455	689	-234	56	27	34.62%
10	Skewen	26	9	0	17	417	548	-131	47	27	34.62%
11	Seven Sisters	26	8	1	17	421	585	-164	56	25	32.69%
12	Ystalyfera	26	7	1	18	411	738	-327	51	22	28.85%
13 R	Trebanos	26	5	1	20	415	638	-223	43	16	21.15%
14 R	Ystradgynlais	26	1	1	24	210	919	-709	34	4	5.77%

== Ystalyfera 2003/04 Season Results ==
No.	Date.	Fixture.	Venue.	Opponents.	Result.	F - A.
1	14 Aug.	Friendly	Home	Pontardawe	Won	49 - 0
2	28 Aug.	Friendly	Away	Taibach	Lost	24 - 36
3	2 Sep.	WW Cup 1stRd	Away	Bryncoch	Lost	15 - 20
4	6 Sept.	League	Home	Skewen	Lost	24 - 28
5	13 Sept.	League	Away	Banwen	Lost	13 - 46
6	20 Sep.	League	Home	Nantyffyllon	Won	23 - 21
7	27 Sep.	SV Cup PreRd	Home	Vardre	Lost	24 - 33
8	4 Oct.	League	Away	Glynneath	Lost	3 - 40
9	11 Oct.	League	Home	Bryncoch	Lost	15 - 51
10	18 Oct.	League	Away	Kenfig Hill	Lost	12 - 37
11	25 Oct.	W Cup 2ndRd	Home	Taibach	Won	30 - 19
12	1 Nov.	League	Away	Seven Sisters	Lost	11 - 12
13	8 Nov.	League	Home	Mumbles	Lost	10 - 38
14	15 Nov.	League	Away	Trebanos	Won	31 - 16
15	22 Nov.	League	Home	Ammanford	Won	26 - 15
16	29 Nov.	WCup 3rdRd	Away	Bridgend Athletic	Lost	0 - 55
17	13 Dec.	League	Away	Brynamman	Lost	6 - 23
18	27 Dec.	League	Away	Ystradgynlais	Won	12 - 3
19	3 Jan.	League	Home	Banwen	Lost	5 - 41
20	10 Jan.	League	Away	Nantyffyllon	Lost	9 - 28
21	17 Jan.	League	Home	Glynneath	Lost	12 - 53
22	24 Jan.	League	Away	Bryncoch	Lost	17 - 19
23	7 Feb.	League	Home	Seven Sisters	Drew	22 - 22
24	21 Feb.	League	Away	Ammanford	Lost	9 - 32
25	28 Feb.	League	Away	Mumbles	Lost	10 - 72
26	6 Mar.	League	Home	Ystradgynlais	Won	23 - 5
27	13 Mar.	League	Home	Trebanos	Lost	20 - 29
28	26 Mar.	League	Away	Skewen	Lost	17 - 19
29	10 Apr.	Friendly	Away	Old Wishworthians	Won	43 - 31
30	17 Apr.	League	Away	Maesteg Quins	Lost	22 - 38
31	20 Apr.	League	Home	Kenfig Hill	Lost	5 - 21
32	24 Apr.	League	Home	Brynamman	Won	38 - 31
33	1 May.	League	Home	Maesteg Quins	Won	16 - 7
						596 - 932

== Ystalyfera 2003/04 Season Player Stats ==
57.	Player.	PL.	Tries.	Cons.	DGls.	Pens.	Tot Pts.
1	Damian James	27	13	31	8	23	220
2	Ashley Carter	28	12				60
3	Phillip Thomas	26	8	2			44
4	Martyn Stoneman Captain	28	3	3	1	2	30
5	Simon Chatham	31	5				25
6	Gareth James	9		5		4	22
7	Peter Abraham	20	3		2		21
8	Graham Jones	23	4				20
9	Leighton Prosser	28	3	1			17
10	Mark Rewston	31	3				15
11	David Thomas	18	3				15
12	Arwel Williams	17	3				15
13	Mark McComas	10	3				15
14	Kevin Williams	29	2	1			12
15	Tristian Davies	27	2				10
15	Jason Humphries	27	2				10
17	Neil Lynch	31	1				5
18	Alun Guerrier	29	1				5
19	Neil Brown	26	1				5
20	Martin Jones	13	1				5
21	Jason Long	8	1				5
22	Simon Donovan	4	1				5
23	Kevin McComas	2	1				5
23	Andrew Luther	2	1				5
25	Paul Morris	16					
26	Paul Williams	11					
26	Keiran Lloyd	11					
28	Craig Lewis	9					
29	David Willis	7					
29	Andrew Key	7					
29	Steven Munkley	7					
29	Christopher Hicks	7					
33	Nigel White	6					
34	Dan Cluroe	5					
34	Jason Donovan	5					
36	Llyr Hopkin	4					
37	Ceri Howells	3					
37	Simon Willis	3					
37	Paul Strange	3					
37	Paul John Stevens	3					
41	Ian Morgan	2					
41	Joe Roberts	2					
41	Lyndon Jones	2					
44	Christopher Thomas	1					
44	John Williams	1					
44	Lee Morris	1					
44	Richie Gregg	1					
44	Jamie Bradley	1					
44	Jonathan Rees	1					
44	Alistair Rees	1					
44	Sam Richards	1					
44	Alan Williams	1					
44	Kevin Allen	1					
44	Nathan Davies	1					
44	Steven Willis	1					
44	Martin Bennett	1					
44	Alun Rees	1					
	'Penalty Tries'		1				5
	'Team Total'	33	78	43	11	29	596
