= 2009–10 Ystalyfera RFC season =

Having returned to Division 3 and celebrating 125 years of competitive rugby, the ‘Fera finished in 6th place, the highest level to date in the National League. The season began early with six wins and three defeats into October. This was similar to the promotion season a year before, the defeats being two friendlies versus Glamorgan County and Welsh Cup holders (shortly to be League Champions) Neath. Glynneath home was the other. In this run was a comprehensive first ever win at Seven Sisters at the 25th time of asking. This performance was one of the best of the season, when the ‘Fera outplayed respected opponents in every facet of the game, not allowing any opportunity for the home team to make any impact, and dominating proceedings throughout. The Swansea Valley Cup began with a Preliminary Round win over Glais 29–7. The remaining October games were against who would prove to be the final top three sides Tondu, Skewen and Kenfig Hill. Having played 12 games in 8 weeks did leave a mark against these well organised sides, Ystalyfera settling in 5th position out of 12 in the Division. In November, being the highest placed Swansea Valley side, success in the Cup competition was anticipated, however on a wet night at Vardre plans went astray and despite a late fight back the semi-final game was lost 14–20. December started with a hard earned 12–9 victory away at Bryncoch. A 2nd Round Welsh Plate defeat against in form Skewen, was followed by a commendable boxing day ‘revenge’ 6–5 victory at Glynneath. Four home games in January and February saw capable wins versus Briton Ferry, Seven Sisters and Cwmavon, losing to the well structured Tondu side. Throughout the remainder of the season, only two more wins would be achieved, both at home. Defeats away at Brynamman and at Nantyffyllon were close run affairs, the ‘Fera team more than earning the right to claim victory in both games. In summary consolidation at the higher level augur's well for the club, onwards and upwards being the order of the day.

Both Dane Clancy and Damian James scored over 100 points, the referee in the final game at Nantyffyllon denying Damian the higher total and a win for the club. Compensation for Damian can be the most tries scored (11). The young pack more than held its own against some big and well experienced opponents, the backs giving their best against well drilled and organised sides. Captain was the ever reliable Paul Davies for the third time, he and other mainstream players like Mathew Scott, Steffan Jones, Gareth James and Phillip Thomas (to mention a few), were troubled by injury and it was heartening that the squad was big and strong enough to deal with these setbacks and finish in the top half of the table. Whilst the commitment and efforts of the younger members of the side can be recognised and deems well for the future, older stalwarts do provide much needed and welcomed help and support for colleagues, coaches and Team Manager alike. No less than six ex-captains played this season.

Players Player of the year was Jonathan Williams and the Supporters favourite was Jesse Patton.

== National league division 3 south west ==
Pos.	Team.	PL.	W.	D.	L.	F.	A.	Bon.	Try.	Pts.	%.
1 P	Skewen	22	21	0	1	680	183	13	96	97	95.45%
2 P	Tondu	22	19	1	2	618	243	14	83	92	88.64%
3	Kenfig Hill	22	16	0	6	654	321	13	92	77	72.73%
4	Glynneath	22	15	1	6	593	229	12	78	74	70.45%
5	Seven Sisters	22	12	0	10	444	377	7	54	55	54.55%
6	Ystalyfera	22	11	0	11	401	537	7	42	51	50.00%
7	Bryncoch	22	9	0	13	418	582	5	46	41	40.91%
8	Nantyffyllon	22	8	0	14	254	505	3	31	35	36.36%
9	Cwmavon	22	6	1	15	338	483	8	43	34	29.55%
10	Brynamman	22	5	1	16	349	642	9	37	31	25.00%
11 R	Briton Ferry	22	5	0	17	289	496	6	34	26	22.73%
12 R	Maesteg Quins	22	3	0	19	264	704	6	30	18	13.64%

== Ystalyfera 2009/10 Season Results ==
No.	Date.	Fixture.	Venue.	Opponents.	Result.	F - A.
1	15 Aug.	SVCup PreRd	Home	Glais	Won	29 - 7
2	23 Aug.	Friendly	Home	Glamorgan County	Lost	7 - 33
3	27 Aug.	Friendly	Home	Trebanos	Won	25 - 17
4	5 Sept.	League	Home	Glynneath	Lost	8 - 13
5	9 Sept.	Friendly	Home	Neath	Lost	5 - 38
6	12 Sept.	League	Away	Maesteg Quins	Won	22 - 16
7	19 Sept.	League	Home	Nantyffyllon	Won	29 - 0
8	26 Sept.	League	Away	Seven Sisters	Won	48 - 10
9	3 Oct.	League	Home	Brynamman	Won	31 - 12
10	10 Oct.	League	Away	Tondu	Lost	3 - 46
11	17 Oct.	League	Home	Skewen	Lost	6 - 53
12	24 Oct.	League	Away	Kenfig Hill	Lost	3 - 21
13	26 Nov.	SV Cup SF	Away	Vardre	Lost	14 - 20
14	5 Dec.	League	Away	Bryncoch	Won	12 - 9
15	12 Dec.	W Plate 2 Rd	Home	Skewen	Lost	7 - 36
16	26 Dec.	League	Away	Glynneath	Won	6 - 5
17	16 Jan.	League	Home	Briton Ferry	Won	19 - 0
18	23 Jan.	League	Home	Seven Sisters	Won	14 - 11
19	20 Feb.	League	Home	Tondu	Lost	10 - 33
20	27 Feb.	League	Home	Cwmavon	Won	24 - 21
21	6 Mar.	League	Away	Skewen	Lost	3 - 76
22	3 Apr.	League	Away	Briton Ferry	Lost	5 - 30
23	10 Apr.	League	Home	Bryncoch	Won	37 - 26
24	24 Apr.	League	Away	Brynamman	lost	17 - 22
25	17 Apr.	League	Home	Maesteg Quins	Won	45 - 26
26	24 Apr.	League	Away	Cwmavon	Lost	9 - 48
27	27 Apr.	League	Home	Kenfig Hill	Lost	21 - 30
28	1 May.	League	Away	Nantyffyllon	Lost	29 - 31
						488 - 688

== Ystalyfera 2009/10 Season Player Stats ==
46.	Player.	PL.	Tries.	Cons.	DGls.	Pens.	Tot Pts.
1	Dane Clancy	19	2	21		19	109
2	Damian James	26	11	7	1	12	108
3	Gareth James	7	1	6	2	12	59
4	Mathew Scott	22	9	1		1	50
5	Steffan Jones	25	5				25
6	Craig Watkins	24	5				25
7	Mathew Dunne	26	3				15
8	Arwel Williams	18	3				15
9	Jesse Patton	27	2				10
10	Phillip Thomas	22	2				10
11	Ryan Evans	3	2				10
12	Graham Jones	26	1				5
12	Daniel White	26	1				5
14	Paul Davies Captain	23	1				5
15	Kevin Williams	22	1				5
16	Gavin Richards	13	1				5
17	Simon Chatham	8	1				5
18	Alun Guerrier	4	1				5
18	Tom Barry	4	1				5
20	Martyn Stoneman	10		1			2
21	Jonathan Williams	28					
22	Carwyn Williams	25					
23	Greg Williams	22					
24	Nick Stevens	20					
24	Nathan Hicks	20					
24	Steven Myers	20					
27	Jonathan Evans	17					
28	Kieran Lloyd	15					
29	Lyndon Osborne	14					
30	Simon Dunne	12					
31	Craig Lloyd	10					
31	Neil Brown	10					
33	Neil Lynch	8					
34	Andy Llewellyn	6					
35	Ashley Carter	3					
36	Robert White	2					
37	Ceri Wyn myers	1					
37	David Hawkins	1					
37	Gareth Noble	1					
37	Chris Demeldera	1					
37	Chris Lewis	1					
37	Aaron Ace	1					
37	Peter Abraham	1					
	'Penalty Tries'		2				10
	'Team Total'	28	55	36	3	44	488
