= 2005–06 Ystalyfera RFC season =

For the last two seasons Ystalyfera RFC had finished in 12th place narrowly avoiding relegation. At the end of this campaign the 'Fera would again finish 12th, but thanks to a league re-structure and the demise of being deducted 3 points resulted in relegation to Division 4 South West.

The end of 2005 started well. Up until January Ystalyfera had won six out of eleven matches. After the start of the new year however confidence ebbed away and the remaining fifteen saw only two wins, the last three being large defeats, 5-82 at Cwmavon where only 14 players were available and the bus broke down to add to the misery, 17-64 at Bryncoch and the last game of the season at home to Vardre 14-45. This last game was a replay of a 28 December fixture when although both sides were on the field and ready, no referee turned up and the game had to be postponed. Required contact with the nominated referee in the preceding week had been made but he later advised the WRU that he was ill and could not officiate. Although all league match referees are appointed by the WRU no automatic replacement was organised as the rules specify the home side must request for one. An appeal by the club on grounds that we were only aware of the referee's illness on match day proved useless and three points were deducted. This was the 'death knell' Ystalyfera being 2 points short and relegated.

Unusually no specific cup fixtures took place this season. Voided in the Welsh Cup after 'scratching' the year before, the Swansea Valley Cup was cancelled, and the West Wales Cup was broken up into three Cup, Plate and Bowl competitions based on the first ten league match results. Competition entry was selected by league position level, Ystalyfera's merit table position was 7th out of 19 in the West Wales Tovali Bowl. Only the top four qualified for the play off.

Damian James was captain for a second year and was maximum points scorer with 148 and top try scorer with 13. Ryan Evans was voted the most popular amongst the Players while Jonathan Evans was voted Supporters Player of the year.

== National League Division 3 South West ==
Pos.	Team.	PL.	W.	D.	L.	F.	A.	Bal.	Try.	Pts.	%.
1 P	Tonna	26	22	0	4	673	348	+325	95	66	84.62%
2 P	Cwmavon	26	21	0	5	754	269	+485	108	63	80.77%
3	Vardre	26	21	0	5	694	244	+450	88	63	80.77%
4	Nantyffyllon	26	20	1	5	651	336	+315	82	61	78.85%
5	Bryncoch	26	14	2	10	565	465	+100	74	44	57.69%
6	Aberavon Quins	26	13	1	12	544	430	+114	71	40	51.92%
7	Skewen	26	11	1	14	484	529	-45	65	34	44.23%
8	Tondu	26	11	0	15	535	503	+32	67	33	42.31%
9	Cwmgors	26	11	0	15	472	481	-9	60	33	42.31%
10	Kenfig Hill	26	9	2	15	519	631	-112	66	29	38.46%
11	Brynamman	26	8	1	17	394	520	-126	52	25	32.69%
12 R	Ystalyfera............-3pts	26	8	2	16	468	770	-302	68	23	34.62%
13 R	Resolven..............-3pts	26	5	1	20	389	834	-445	53	10	21.15%
14 R	Alltwen	26	2	1	23	253	1035	-782	28	7	9.62%

== Ystalyfera 2005/06 Season Results ==
No.	Date.	Fixture.	Venue.	Opponents.	Result.	F - A.
1	18 Aug.	Friendly	Home	Taibach	Won	17 - 10
2	3 Sep.	League	Home	Aberavon Quins	Lost	18 - 20
3	10 Sep.	League	Away	Kenfig Hill	Won	34 - 30
4	17 Sept.	League	Home	Nantyffyllon	Lost	5 - 25
5	24 Sept.	League	Away	Cwmgors	Lost	7 - 24
6	1 Oct.	League	Home	Brynamman	Won	24 - 18
7	8 Oct.	League	Away	Tonna	Lost	7 - 24
8	15 Oct.	League	Home	Tondu	Won	18 - 16
9	12 Nov.	League	Away	Alltwen	Lost	19 - 8
10	3 Dec.	League	Home	Skewen	Won	24 - 22
11	10 Dec.	League	Away	Resolven	Won	25 - 16
12	17 Dec.	League	Home	Cwmavon	Lost	12 - 21
13	7 Jan.	League	Away	Aberavon Quins	Lost	5 - 36
14	14 Jan.	League	Home	Kenfig Hill	Drew	29 - 29
15	21 Jan.	League	Away	Nantyffyllon	Lost	12 - 32
16	28 Jan.	League	Home	Cwmgors	Lost	23 - 26
17	11 Feb.	League	Away	Brynamman	Lost	5 - 34
18	18 Feb.	League	Home	Tonna	Lost	31 - 35
19	25 Feb.	League	Away	Skewen	Won	29 - 17
20	4 Mar.	League	Away	Tondu	Lost	10 - 46
21	25 Mar.	League	Home	Bryncoch	Drew	20 - 20
22	1 Apr.	League	Away	Vardre	Lost	12 - 34
23	8 Apr.	League	Home	Alltwen	Won	38 - 12
24	22 Apr.	League	Home	Resolven	Lost	25 - 34
25	29 Apr.	League	Away	Cwmavon	Lost	5 - 82
26	2 May.	League	Away	Bryncoch	Lost	17 - 64
27	9 May.	League	Home	Vardre	Lost	14 - 45
						485 - 780

== Ystalyfera 2005/06 Season Player Stats ==
47.	Player.	PL.	Tries.	Cons.	DGls.	Pens.	Tot Pts.
1	Damian James Captain	20	13	19	4	11	148
2	Phillip Thomas	27	8	7			54
3	Martyn Stoneman	24	5	7	1	4	54
4	Mark Rewston	25	5				25
5	David Thomas	23	4				20
6	Kevin Williams	20	4				20
7	John Williams	7	4				20
8	Arwel Williams	17	3	1			17
9	Ryan Evans	24	3				15
9	Graham Jones	24	3				15
11	Sam Jones	6	3				15
12	Mathew Scott	21	2	1			12
13	Jason Humphries	23	2				10
14	Craig Lloyd	19	2				10
15	Christian Roets	7	2				10
16	Leighton Prosser	25	1				5
17	Keiran Lloyd	20	1				5
18	Jonathan Evans	16	1				5
19	Christopher Hicks	11	1				5
20	Simon Chatham	8	1				5
21	Gareth Noble	1	1				5
22	Alun Guerrier	24					
23	Neil Brown	23					
23	Neil Lynch	23					
25	Nigel White	9					
26	Martin Jones	8					
27	Craig Lewis	4					
27	Carl Rano	4					
29	Stephan Jenkins	3					
29	Joe Roberts	3					
31	Mike Morgan	2					
31	Peter Abraham	2					
31	Paul Morris	2					
31	Nigel Baker	2					
31	Neil Falvey	2					
31	Jamie Morgan	2					
37	Tristian Davies	1					
37	Simon Donovan	1					
37	Gavin Knapp	1					
37	Chris Austin	1					
37	Jesse Patton	1					
37	Aaron Davies	1					
37	Craig Howells	1					
37	Stuart Hastie	1					
37	David Love	1					
37	Steven Myers	1					
37	David Cullen	1					
	'Penalty Tries'		2				10
	'Team Total'	27	71	35	5	15	485
