= 2004–05 Ystalyfera RFC season =

Following on from the good form at the end of the previous season, this new campaign started well with two league wins and progress through the preliminary round of the Swansea Valley Cup over Vardre 11-9 and over Treorchy 22–17 in the First Round of the Welsh Cup before the end of September. The Treorchy game was all the more rewarding, they being a Division Two East side experiencing a slide from the top flight – Simon Chatham scored a try from the wing and new Captain and outside half Damian James a try and four penalties.

Problems and some bad luck then returned with only two league wins in the next sixteen games. The Welsh Cup second round tie versus Maesteg was scratched and exit from the Swansea Valley Cup was inflicted by Abercrave 7–17. Keeping up something of a habit, the last two games of the season were victories over the only teams below us, ensuring we again remained in Division Three. The first of these crucial fixtures was at home to Glynneath.

An inspiring 57-17 was achieved by fast flowing rugby all over the field. Christian Roets, David Hawkins and Simon Donovan scored two tries each. Phillip Thomas, John Williams and Peter Abraham one try each, Gareth James kicked 6 conversions. Three days later Ystalyfera beat Ammanford 38–26 at Ynysydarren, Christian Roets scored a try, Damian James a try and four conversions, and Alun Guerrier four tries – a record in a single game by a forward.

Damian James scored 202 points this season, Christian Roets getting 9 tries. Christian was also voted Players Player of the year whilst Arwel Williams was Supporters favourite.

== National League Division 3 South West ==
Pos.	Team.	PL.	W.	D.	L.	F.	A.	Bal.	Try.	Pts.	%.
1 P	Maesteg Harlequins	26	20	0	6	705	352	+353	93	60	76.92%
2 P	Seven Sisters	26	18	0	8	621	393	+228	83	54	69.23%
3	Bryncoch	26	17	0	9	558	445	+113	75	51	65.38%
4	Aberavon Quins	26	16	0	10	544	396	+148	82	48	61.54%
5	Kenfig Hill..........-6pts	26	18	0	8	524	407	+117	68	48	69.23%
6	Vardre	26	15	0	11	570	349	+221	72	45	57.69%
7	Nantyffyllon	26	15	0	11	495	425	+70	60	45	57.69%
8	Alltwen	26	12	2	12	453	519	-66	50	38	50.00%
9	Cwmgors	26	12	0	14	434	473	-39	59	36	46.15%
10	Skewen	26	12	0	14	426	456	-30	46	36	46.15%
11	Brynamman	26	12	0	14	342	478	-136	39	36	46.15%
12	Ystalyfera	26	7	1	18	482	672	-190	57	22	28.85%
13 R	Glynneath	26	3	1	22	245	781	-516	33	10	13.46%
14 R	Ammanford	26	3	0	23	363	636	-273	44	9	11.54%

== Ystalyfera 2004/05 Season Results ==
No.	Date.	Fixture.	Venue.	Opponents.	Result.	F - A.
1	25 Aug.	SV Cup Pre Rd	Home	Vardre	Won	11 - 9
2	4 Sep.	League	Home	Bryncoch	Lost	13 - 24
3	11 Sep.	League	Away	Nantyffyllon	Won	27 - 11
4	18 Sept.	League	Home	Brynamman	Won	26 - 20
5	25 Sept.	W Cup 1st Rd	Home	Treorchy	Won	22 - 17
6	2 Oct.	League	Home	Cwmgors	Lost	18 - 22
7	9 Oct.	League	Away	Aberavon Quins	Lost	26 - 27
8	16 Oct.	League	Home	Maesteg Quins	Lost	3 - 35
9	13 Nov.	League	Away	Skewen	Lost	0 - 16
10	27 Nov.	League	Away	Vardre	Lost	15 - 26
11	4 Dec.	League	Home	Alltwen	Lost	18 - 29
12	11 Dec.	League	Away	Ammanford	Won	27 - 15
13	28 Dec.	SV Cup 1stRd	Home	Abercrave	Lost	7 - 17
14	8 Jan.	League	Home	Nantyffyllon	Lost	20 - 22
15	15 Jan.	League	Away	Brynamman	Won	22 - 21
16	22 Jan.	League	Home	Seven Sisters	Lost	5 - 32
17	29 Jan.	League	Away	Cwmgors	Lost	6 - 24
18	19 Feb.	League	Home	Aberavon Quins	Lost	10 - 29
19	26 Feb.	League	Away	Kenfig Hill	Lost	22 - 34
20	5 Mar.	League	Away	Maesteg Quins	Lost	8 - 37
21	26 Mar.	Friendly	Away	Doncaster Phoenix	Won	14 - 0
22	26 Mar.	Friendly	Away	Doncaster Dragons	Drew	7 - 7
23	2 Apr.	League	Away	Glynneath	Lost	22 - 34
24	5 Apr.	League	Away	Bryncoch	Lost	10 - 37
25	9 Apr.	League	Home	Skewen	Won	22 - 21
26	13 Apr.	League	Home	Kenfig Hill	Lost	19 - 20
27	16 Apr.	League	Home	Vardre	Lost	13 - 43
28	20 Apr.	League	Away	Seven Sisters	Lost	27 - 42
29	23 Apr.	League	Away	Alltwen	Drew	8 - 8
30	27 Apr.	League	Home	Glynneath	Won	57 - 17
31	30 Apr.	League	Home	Ammanford	Won	38 - 26
						543 - 722

== Ystalyfera 2004/05 Season Player Stats ==
52.	Player.	PL.	Tries.	Cons.	DGls.	Pens.	Tot Pts.
1	Damian James Captain	31	5	24	7	36	202
2	Gareth James	9	2	8	1	8	53
3	Christian Roets	27	9				45
4	Simon Donovan	24	8				40
5	Martyn Stoneman	26	5	1			27
6	Simon Bevan	12	4	3			26
7	Alun Guerrier	25	4				20
8	Phillip Thomas	31	3				15
9	Arwel Williams	23	3				15
10	Graham Jones	27	2				10
11	Neil Lynch	26	2				10
12	Kevin Williams	21	2				10
13	Peter Abraham	13	2				10
14	Christopher Hicks	9	2				10
15	David Hawkins	2	2				10
15	Pablo Van Renberg	2	2				10
17	Mark Rewston	31	1				5
18	Kieran Lloyd	30	1				5
19	Simon Chatham	18	1				5
20	David Thomas	10	1				5
21	John Williams	3	1				5
22	Leighton Prosser	30					
23	Neil Brown	26					
24	Arwel Hughes	12					
25	Lee Morris	11					
26	Jason Humphries	9					
26	Adam Sinnott	9					
28	Ceirion Thomas	8					
29	Geraint Lewis	7					
30	Tristian Davies	6					
31	Mark McComas	5					
31	David Willis	5					
31	Paul Davies	5					
31	Andrew Keys	5					
31	Nigel White	5					
36	Alan Williams	4					
37	Neil Falvey	3					
37	Martin Jones	3					
39	Ian Morgan	2					
39	Garry Guppy	2					
39	Jamie Rees	2					
39	Julian Hopkins	2					
39	Jason Donovan	2					
44	Kevin Allen	1					
44	Nathan Hicks	1					
44	Ceri Morgan	1					
44	Craig Lewis	1					
44	Stephan Roets	1					
44	Ryan Evans	1					
44	Martin Bennett	1					
44	Christopher Dicks	1					
44	Joe Roberts	1					
	'Penalty Tries'		1				5
	'Team Total'	31	63	36	8	44	543
