= WRU Division Three South West =

Rugby union league in Wales

- Founded: 1995
- No. of teams: 12
- Country: Wales
- Most recent champion: Maesteg Harlequins RFC (2011–12)
- Level on pyramid: 4
- Promotion to: WRU Division Two West
- Relegation to: WRU Division Four South West
- Website: www.wru.co.uk/1151_2144.php/WRU

The Welsh Rugby Union Division Three South West (also called the SWALEC Division Three South West for sponsorship reasons) is a rugby union league in Wales.

== Competition format and sponsorship ==
=== Competition ===
There are 12 clubs in the WRU Division Three South West. During the course of a season (which lasts from September to May) each club plays the others twice, once at their home ground and once at that of their opponents for a total of 22 games for each club, with a total of 132 games in each season. Teams receive four points for a win and two point for a draw, an additional bonus point is awarded to either team if they score four tries or more in a single match. No points are awarded for a loss though the losing team can gain a bonus point for finishing the match within seven points of the winning team. Teams are ranked by total points, then the number of tries scored and then points difference. At the end of each season, the club with the most points is crowned as champion. If points are equal the tries scored then points difference determines the winner. The team who is declared champion at the end of the season is eligible for promotion to the WRU Division Two West. The two lowest placed teams are relegated to the WRU Division Four South West.

=== Sponsorship ===
In 2008 the Welsh Rugby Union announced a new sponsorship deal for the club rugby leagues with SWALEC valued at £1 million (GBP). The initial three year sponsorship was extended at the end of the 2010/11 season, making SWALEC the league sponsors until 2015. The leagues sponsored are the WRU Divisions one through to seven.

- (2002–2005) Lloyds TSB
- (2005–2008) Asda
- (2008–2015) SWALEC

== 2011/2012 Season ==
=== League teams ===
- Aberavon Green Stars RFC
- Brynamman RFC
- Bryncoch RFC
- BP Llandarcy RFC
- Maesteg Harlequins RFC
- Morriston RFC
- Mumbles RFC
- Pencoed RFC
- Seven Sisters RFC
- Taibach RFC
- Ystalyfera RFC
- Vardre RFC

=== 2011/2012 Table ===
2011–2012 WRU Division Three South West League Table
	Club	Played	Won	Drawn	Lost	Points for	Points against	Tries for	Tries against	Try bonus	Losing bonus	Points
1	Maesteg Harlequins RFC	20	20	0	0	630	235	86	21	12	0	92
2	Seven Sisters RFC	20	15	0	5	610	268	81	30	13	4	77
3	Taibach RFC	20	15	0	5	466	349	53	39	6	1	67
4	Ystalyfera RFC	20	13	0	7	592	349	78	35	6	3	61
5	Pencoed RFC	20	9	1	10	507	427	62	53	7	5	50
6	Mumbles RFC	20	8	0	12	485	394	59	43	7	5	44
7	Bryncoch RFC	20	8	1	11	378	453	51	53	4	3	41
8	Brynamman RFC	20	8	0	12	360	410	38	51	4	4	40
9	Morriston RFC	20	6	0	14	338	511	39	67	2	1	27
10	Vardre RFC	20	5	0	15	329	471	33	61	2	2	24
11	Aberavon Green Stars RFC	20	2	0	18	208	1036	26	153	3	1	12
12	BP Llandarcy RFC	0	0	0	0	0	0	0	0	0	0	0
Correct as of 27 May 2012

== 2010/2011 Season ==
=== League teams ===
- Aberavon Green Stars RFC
- Brynamman RFC
- Bryncoch RFC
- Cwmavon RFC
- Glynneath RFC
- Kenfig Hill RFC
- Morriston RFC
- Nantyffyllon RFC
- Pencoed RFC
- Seven Sisters RFC
- Taibach RFC
- Ystalyfera RFC

=== 2010/2011 Table ===
2010–2011 WRU Division Three South West League Table
	Club	Played	Won	Drawn	Lost	Points for	Points against	Tries for	Tries against	Try bonus	Losing bonus	Points
1	Glynneath RFC	22	21	0	1	665	251	95	28	14	1	99
2	Kenfig Hill RFC	22	20	0	2	898	296	132	33	15	1	96
3	Aberavon Green Stars RFC	22	15	1	6	624	263	88	24	8	2	72
4	Seven Sisters RFC	22	13	0	9	621	350	82	41	10	7	69
5	Ystalyfera RFC	22	15	0	7	565	437	71	50	7	1	68
6	Brynamman RFC	22	11	0	11	517	440	59	53	5	5	54
7	Pencoed RFC	22	9	1	12	459	536	57	67	5	2	45
8	Morriston RFC	22	7	1	14	384	596	50	85	5	3	38
9	Bryncoch RFC	22	6	1	15	455	614	51	86	4	4	34
10	Taibach RFC	22	6	0	16	296	518	34	68	2	4	30
11	Nantyffyllon RFC	22	4	1	17	294	679	35	92	2	2	22
12	Cwmavon RFC	22	2	1	19	237	1035	25	152	0	2	12
Correct as of 27 May 2012

== 2009/2010 Season ==
=== League teams ===
- Briton Ferry RFC
- Bryncoch RFC
- Brynamman RFC
- Cwmavon RFC
- Glynneath RFC
- Kenfig Hill RFC
- Maesteg Harlequins RFC
- Nantyffyllon RFC
- Seven Sisters RFC
- Skewen RFC
- Tondu RFC
- Ystalyfera RFC

=== 2009/2010 Table ===
2009–2010 WRU Division Three South West League Table
Club	Played	Won	Drawn	Lost	Points for	Points against	Tries for	Tries against	Try bonus	Losing bonus	Points
Skewen RFC	22	21	0	1	680	183	96	13	12	1	97
Tondu RFC	22	19	1	2	618	243	83	24	13	1	92
Kenfig Hill RFC	22	16	0	6	654	321	92	33	11	2	77
Glynneath RFC	22	15	1	6	593	229	78	23	10	2	74
Seven Sisters RFC	22	12	0	10	444	377	54	41	4	3	55
Ystalyfera RFC	22	11	0	11	401	537	42	74	4	3	51
Bryncoch RFC	22	9	0	13	418	582	46	80	4	1	41
Nantyffyllon RFC	22	8	0	14	254	505	31	63	1	2	35
Cwmavon RFC	22	6	1	15	338	483	43	61	3	5	34
Brynamman RFC	22	5	1	16	349	642	37	93	3	6	31
Briton Ferry RFC	22	5	0	17	289	496	34	59	3	3	26
Maesteg Harlequins RFC	22	3	0	19	264	704	30	102	3	3	18
Correct as of 3 August 2010

== 2008/2009 Season ==
=== League teams ===
- Aberavon Quins RFC
- Briton Ferry RFC
- Glynneath RFC
- Kenfig Hill RFC
- Maesteg Celtic RFC
- Maesteg Harlequins RFC
- Morriston RFC
- Nantyffyllon RFC
- Seven Sisters RFC
- Skewen RFC
- Tondu RFC
- Tonna RFC

=== 2008/2009 Table ===
2008–2009 WRU Division Three South West League Table
Club	Played	Won	Drawn	Lost	Points for	Points against	Tries for	Tries against	Try bonus	Losing bonus	Points
Aberavon Quins RFC	22	18	1	3	572	194	70	20	9	2	85
Tondu RFC	22	17	1	4	720	220	98	27	9	2	81
Glynneath RFC	22	15	1	6	479	345	59	40	7	2	71
Skewen RFC	22	14	1	7	531	239	64	25	7	5	70
Nantyffyllon RFC	22	15	1	6	478	294	62	31	5	2	69
Kenfig Hill RFC	22	12	1	9	477	383	72	43	6	3	59
Morriston RFC	22	11	1	10	441	486	61	64	7	0	53
Maesteg Harlequins RFC	22	7	2	13	373	393	33	47	3	6	41
Briton Ferry RFC	22	6	0	16	300	541	35	64	3	4	31
Seven Sisters RFC	22	5	1	16	255	611	27	79	2	4	28
Maesteg Celtic RFC	22	5	0	17	297	544	35	67	2	5	27
Tonna RFC	22	2	0	20	263	936	27	136	1	1	10
Correct as of 2 June 2009

== 2007/2008 Season ==
BP Llandarcy were named champions at the end of the season and were promoted to Division Two West. Vadre were relegated to Division Four South West for finishing second from last while Banwen dropped two leagues to Division Five Central for failing to raise a team on more than one occasion.

=== League teams ===
- Aberavon Quins RFC
- Banwen RFC
- BP RFC
- Briton Ferry RFC
- Kenfig Hill RFC
- Maesteg Harlequins RFC
- Nantyffyllon RFC
- Seven Sisters RFC
- Skewen RFC
- Tondu RFC
- Tonna RFC
- Vadre RFC

=== 2007/2008 Table ===
2007–2008 WRU Division Three South West League Table
Club	Played	Won	Drawn	Lost	Points for	Points against	Tries for	Tries against	Try bonus	Losing bonus	Points
BP RFC	20	15	2	3	450	227	62	27	10	1	75
Aberavon Quins RFC	20	14	0	6	507	236	66	28	8	4	68
Tondu RFC	20	14	1	5	454	219	62	25	7	3	68
Nantyffyllon RFC	20	13	1	6	410	230	55	25	6	3	63
Skewen RFC	20	13	0	7	364	281	48	35	5	3	60
Maesteg Harlequins RFC	20	9	1	10	356	393	40	54	4	6	48
Seven Sisters RFC	20	10	0	10	235	394	28	52	2	1	43
Briton Ferry RFC	20	8	1	11	358	391	45	46	5	3	42
Kenfig Hill RFC	20	4	0	16	301	512	42	71	6	4	26
Tonna RFC	20	5	0	15	315	528	35	69	1	4	25
Vardre RFC	20	2	0	18	202	541	24	75	2	3	13
Banwen RFC*	0	0	0	0	0	0	0	0	0	0	0
Correct as of 11:23 5 June 2008

* Banwen RFC failed to raise a team on more than one occasion and were relegated to division five. All matches played against opposition in Division Three South West were declared null and void.

== 2006/2007 Season ==
=== League teams ===
- Aberavon Quins RFC
- Amman United RFC
- Banwen RFC
- Brynammon RFC
- Bryncoch RFC
- Cwmgors RFC
- Heol y Cyw RFC
- Kenfig Hill RFC
- Mumbles RFC
- Nantyffyllon RFC
- Skewen RFC
- Tondu RFC
- Vadre RFC

=== 2006/2007 Table ===
2006–07 WRU Division Three League South West Table
Club	Played	Won	Drawn	Lost	Points for	Points against	TF	Points
Mumbles RFC	24	22	0	2	875	230	127	66
Heol y Cyw RFC	24	16	1	7	598	424	89	49
Tondu RFC	24	16	0	8	549	387	71	48
Aberavon Quins RFC	24	14	0	10	547	345	70	42
Nantyffyllon RFC	24	13	0	11	503	410	65	39
Vardre RFC	24	12	0	12	510	489	78	36
Kenfig Hill RFC	24	12	0	12	546	527	68	36
Amman United RFC	24	12	0	12	369	512	46	36
Skewen RFC	24	11	1	12	403	487	51	34
Banwen RFC	24	8	0	16	346	471	40	24
Cwmgors RFC	24	7	0	17	336	723	51	21
Bryncoch RFC	24	7	0	17	355	693	46	21
Brynamman RFC	24	5	0	19	371	610	43	15
Correct as of 2007-10-04
