= Graham Jones =

Graham Jones may refer to:

- Graham Jones (rugby league), rugby league footballer of the 1950s for Wales and Salford
- Graham Jones (rugby union) (1933–2022), Welsh rugby player
- Graham Jones (speedway rider, born 1947) (born 1947), British speedway rider
- Graham Jones (footballer, born 1949), Welsh footballer
- Graham Jones (cyclist) (born 1957), English cyclist
- Graham Jones (English footballer) (born 1957), English association football player
- Graham Jones (Australian footballer) (born 1960), Australian rules football player
- Graham Jones (born 1961), English guitarist in Haircut One Hundred
- Graham Jones (speedway rider) (born 1963), British speedway rider
- Graham Jones (politician) (born 1966), British former MP for Hyndburn
- Graham Jones (director) (born 1973), Irish filmmaker
- Graham Jones (Castlevania), fictional character, main antagonist in the video game Castlevania: Aria of Sorrow

== See also ==
- Graeme Jones (born 1970), footballer
- Wyn Jones (police officer) (Graham Wyn Jones, born c. 1943), British police officer, Assistant Commissioner of the Metropolitan Police
