= 2008–09 Ystalyfera RFC season =

At the end of this season Ystalyfera were promoted back to the level of Division Three after an absence of three years. This was the first taste of success for ten years since the Division Five Championship in season 1998–99, the highest points total and number of league wins since then. The 264 total of most away game points was also equalled.

At the start of the season initial form of the side continued on from the end of the previous campaign, with commanding wins at home up to November, the only defeats being away - a surprising 2nd half collapse at Pontycymmer and the ‘theft’ of a victory at Bryncoch where we more than matched the eventual Division champions. The relatively young ‘Fera side continued to grow in confidence boosted by the experience of no less than 7 former captains namely; Martyn Stoneman, Alun Guerrier, Steven Munkley, Kevin Williams, Peter Abraham, Damian James and Craig Lloyd, all contributing in their own individual ways and the latter two coaching the team in its success. Cornerstone of the achievement was undoubtedly the two young props Kieran Lloyd and Daniel White. Hard working and dedicated they played in every game and won commendable plaudits from both local and visiting onlookers. Captain for his second year Paul Davies, led his side through a surge of five consecutive wins in April whilst getting married and enjoying a honeymoon as well! Gareth James, back in the side from the Bryncoch away game with 5 conversions, finished with the highest season total of 172 points, his career total to date being 535. Brother Damian increased his club record total to 1354 points. Graham Jones was top try scorer with 9 touchdowns. Players Player was Stephan Jones and Supporters Player Daniel White.

A profitable season also delivered in the Welsh Cup where Ystalyfera equalled their highest progress reaching the Third Round for the seventh time. Opportunity to achieve success in the elusive Swansea Valley cup proved disappointing with the termination of the event due to the failure of participating teams to complete the fixtures. This season finished with great promise from an averagely young side, playing a fast positive style of play and much fun to watch.

== National league division 4 south west ==
Pos.	Team.	PL.	W.	D.	L.	F.	A.	Bon.	Try.	Pts.	%.
1 P	Bryncoch............-4pts...	22	21	0	1	742	403	13	106	93	95.45%
2 P	Ystalyfera	22	15	0	7	563	378	9	67	69	68.18%
3	Taibach	22	14	1	7	514	340	10	75	68	65.01%
4	Glyncorrwg	22	13	1	8	468	311	11	61	65	61.36%
5	Resolven	22	12	0	10	460	439	13	61	61	54.55%
6	Pontycymmer	22	10	0	12	384	405	10	52	50	45.45%
7	Aberavon Green Stars	22	10	0	12	342	598	8	49	48	45.45%
8	Ystradgynlais	22	9	0	13	366	451	7	44	43	40.91%
9	Porthcawl	22	7	1	14	490	517	12	64	42	34.09%
10	Vardre	22	8	1	13	232	281	7	44	41	39.54%
11 R	Neath Athletic	22	7	0	15	352	521	13	48	41	31.82%
12 R	Birchgrove	22	4	0	18	286	566	5	38	21	18.18%

== Ystalyfera 2008/09 Season Results ==
No.	Date.	Fixture.	Venue.	Opponents.	Result.	F - A.
	30 Aug.	SVCup PreRd	Away	Glais		walkover
1	13 Sept.	League	Home	Neath Athletic	Won	54 - 8
2	17 Sept.	SV Cup 1st Rd	Home	Vardre	Won	35 - 12
3	20 Sept.	League	Away	Pontycymmer	Lost	19 - 31
4	4 Oct.	League	Home	Porthcawl	Won	27 - 10
5	11 Oct.	League	Away	Bryncoch	Lost	35 - 41
6	18 Oct.	League	Home	Taibach	Won	33 - 5
7	25 Oct.	W Cup 2nd Rd	Home	Old Penarthians	Won	22 - 6
8	1 Nov.	League	Away	Vardre	Won	21 - 10
9	15 Nov.	W Cup 3rd Rd	Home	Aberavon Quins	Lost	6 - 17
10	6 Dec.	League	Home	Ystradgynlais	Won	25 - 12
11	13 Dec.	League	Away	Aberavon Green Stars	Lost	14 - 19
12	17 Jan.	League	Home	Birchgrove	Won	23 - 9
13	24 Jan.	League	Away	Birchgrove	Won	27 - 22
14	31 Jan.	League	Home	Pontycymmer	Lost	17 - 25
15	28 Feb.	League	Away	Porthcawl	Won	17 - 11
16	7 Mar.	League	Home	Bryncoch	Lost	17 - 25
17	20 Mar.	League	Away	Glyncorrwg	Won	20 - 14
18	28 Mar.	League	Away	Taibach	Lost	18 - 23
19	31 Mar.	League	Away	Neath Athletic	Won	39 - 20
20	4 Apr.	League	Home	Vardre	Won	12 - 11
21	11 Apr.	League	Away	Ystradgynlais	Won	27 - 15
22	18 Apr.	League	Home	Aberavon Green Stars	Won	23 - 17
23	22 Apr.	League	Home	Resolven	Won	57 - 21
24	25 Apr.	League	Away	Resolven	Won	27 - 12
25	2 May.	League	Home	Glyncorrwg	Lost	11 - 17
						626 - 413

== Ystalyfera 2008/09 Season Player Stats ==
43.	Player.	PL.	Tries.	Cons.	DGls.	Pens.	Tot Pts.
1	Gareth James	17	4	28	3	29	172
2	Damian James	12	2	11	4	12	80
3	Graham Jones	22	9				45
4	Mathew Dunne	21	7				35
5	Martyn Stoneman	18	1	4		6	31
6	Steffan Jones	23	6				30
7	Paul Davies Captain	20	6				30
8	Phillip Thomas	24	5				25
9	Craig Watkins	18	5				25
11	Mathew Scott	6	3		1		18
12	Alun Guerrier	22	3				15
13	Jonathan Evans	21	2				10
14	Arwel Williams	13	2				10
15	Steven Munkley	11	2				10
16	Jonathan Morgan	10	2				10
17	Gareth Noble	2	2				10
18	Kieran Lloyd	25	1				5
19	Jesse Patton	22	1				5
20	Simon Chatham	21	1				5
21	Lyndon Osborne	16	1				5
22	Aled Watkins	9	1				5
23	Ashley Carter	2	1				5
24	Simon Donovan	1	1				5
25	Daniel White	25					
26	Nick Stevens	24					
27	Jonathan Williams	20					
28	Ryan Evans	13					
29	Neil Lynch	12					
29	Greg Williams	12					
31	Nathan Hicks	11					
32	Simon Dunne	10					
33	Neil Brown	9					
34	Craig Lloyd	5					
34	Jamie Thomas	5					
34	Kevin Williams	5					
37	Thomos (Blanco) Williams	4					
37	Gavin Richards	4					
39	Phillip John Stephens	3					
39	Peter Abraham	3					
41	Ceri Wyn Myers	1					
41	David Hawkins	1					
41	Robert Morgan	1					
	'Penalty Tries'		2				10
	'Team Total'	25	75	43	8	47	626
