= 2002–03 Ystalyfera RFC season =

The competitive standard of rugby within the fourth Division began to show itself during this season. Four wins in the first twelve games up to Christmas, followed by three wins in the next nine up to the end of March, left the ‘Fera in a precarious position. Difficulties were reflected in the Cup tournaments, early first round exits being the form. Nevertheless typically and with ‘dogged’ resistance and determination, the side earned three consecutive league victories astride an Easter tour win at Wakefield. 121 points were scored in these vital games, including 18 tries, and three sin bins in the process reflected the intensity and effort.

The first match was the most notable being a 48-17 away ‘smothering’ of long time adversaries Tumble – scrum half Phillip Thomas scored two tries, centre Simon Donovan two tries, a try for prop Andrew Key, a try for flanker Stephen Munkley, a try and sin bin for hooker Arwel Williams and a drop goal with five conversions for outside half Damian James. This result was followed seven days later with a 22-6 home win over Mumbles, Donovan scored another two tries, a try for winger Ashley Carter, a try and conversion for D. James and another sin bin for Williams. The 17-10 home win over Kenfig Hill saw another try for Donovan, a try for Andrew Key, a conversion and drop goal for D. James and a conversion by Martyn Stoneman. This result guaranteed Division Four rugby for Ystalyfera next year. D. James scored 127 points this season, Donovan 8 tries.

Captain for the fourth time was Kevin Williams. Neil Lynch was voted Players Player of the year and Ashley Carter voted favourite amongst the supporters for the second year running.

== National League Division 4 West ==
Pos.	Team.	PL.	W.	D.	L.	F.	A.	Bal.	Try.	Pts.	%.
1 P	Pontyberem	26	24	0	2	648	228	+420	92	72	92.31%
2	Bryncoch	26	23	0	3	712	353	+359	100	69	88.46%
3	Maesteg Harlequins	26	21	1	4	639	325	+314	85	64	82.69%
4	Kidwelly	26	14	0	12	492	409	+83	61	42	53.85%
5	Kenfig Hill	26	13	1	12	461	448	+13	50	40	51.92%
6	Mumbles	26	12	3	11	516	367	+149	57	39	51.92%
7	Tenby United	26	11	1	14	369	407	-38	48	34	44.23%
8	Haverfordwest	26	10	2	14	416	522	-106	46	32	42.31%
9	Brynamman	26	10	1	15	420	472	-52	48	31	40.38%
10	Ystalyfera	26	10	0	16	411	523	-112	51	30	38.46%
11	Skewen	26	9	0	17	358	610	-252	43	27	34.62%
12	Gorseinon	26	8	1	17	327	495	-168	43	25	32.69%
13 R	Penclawdd	26	6	0	20	299	648	-349	39	18	23.08%
14 R	Tumble	26	4	1	21	354	615	-261	46	13	17.31%

== Ystalyfera 2002/03 Season Results ==
No.	Date.	Fixture.	Venue.	Opponents.	Result.	F - A.
1	17 Aug.	Friendly	Home	Banwen	Lost	12 - 17
2	7 Sep.	League	Away	Tenby United	Lost	3 - 15
3	14 Sep.	League	Home	Pontyberem	Won	21 - 9
4	21 Sept.	W Cup 1stRd	Home	Fleur De Lys	Lost	24 - 31
5	28 Sept.	League	Home	Maesteg Quins	Lost	12 - 25
6	5 Oct.	League	Away	Haverfordwest	Won	25 - 24
7	12 Oct.	League	Home	Gorseinon	Lost	13 - 20
8	26 Oct.	League	Away	Bryncoch	Lost	10 - 51
9	2 Nov.	League	Home	Penclawdd	Won	22 - 7
10	9 Nov.	League	Away	Skewen	Lost	0 - 14
11	30 Nov.	League	Home	Tumble	Won	12 - 5
12	7 Dec.	League	Away	Mumbles	Lost	9 - 40
13	14 Dec.	League	Home	Kidwelly	Lost	20 - 26
14	21 Dec.	League	Away	Kenfig Hill	Lost	15 - 30
15	28 Dec.	League	Home	Brynamman	Won	33 - 9
16	4 Jan.	League	Home	Tenby United	Lost	6 - 20
17	18 Jan.	League	Away	Maesteg Quins	Lost	13 - 25
18	25 Jan.	League	Home	Haverfordwest	Won	21 - 6
19	8 Feb.	League	Home	Bryncoch	Lost	3 - 20
20	21 Feb.	SV Cup 1stRd	Away	Abercrave	Lost	20 - 30
21	1 Mar.	League	Away	Penclawdd	Lost	10 - 14
22	12 Mar.	League	Away	Pontyberem	Lost	7 - 30
23	15 Mar.	League	Home	Skewen	Won	24 - 6
24	21 Mar.	League	Away	Kidwelly	Lost	10 - 41
25	5 Apr.	League	Away	Tumble	Won	48 - 17
26	12 Apr.	League	Home	Mumbles	Won	22 - 6
27	19 Apr.	Friendly	Away	Wakefield	Won	34 - 26
28	26 Apr.	League	Home	Kenfig Hill	Won	17 - 10
29	2 May.	League	Away	Brynamman	Lost	10 - 22
30	9 May.	League	Away	Gorseinon	Lost	25 - 31
						501 - 627

== Ystalyfera 2002/03 Season Player Stats ==
52.	Player.	PL.	Tries.	Cons.	DGls.	Pens.	Tot Pts.
1	Damian James	27	7	16	5	15	127
2	Simon Donovan	18	8				40
3	Phillip Thomas	29	6	3			36
4	Mike Nottingham	3	1	4	1	6	34
5	Martyn Stoneman	28	4	2	1	1	30
6	Arwel Williams	20	5				25
7	Mike Morgan	5	1	3	1	3	23
8	Ashley Carter	29	4				20
9	Peter Abraham	28	3				15
10	David Thomas	20	3				15
11	Andrew Key	13	3				15
12	Simon Chatham	14	2	1			12
13	Gareth James	2			1	3	12
14	Kevin Williams Captain	28	2				10
15	Martin Jones	14	2				10
16	Steven Munkley	10	2				10
17	Steven Rees	3	2				10
18	Neil Lynch	29	1				5
19	Alun Guerrier	26	1				5
20	Graham Jones	19	1				5
20	Paul Morris	19	1				5
22	Mark McComas	17	1				5
23	Tristian Davies	8	1				5
24	Alan Williams	4	1				5
25	Neil Orme	1	1				5
26	Ian Morgan	1		1			2
27	Neil brown	23					
28	Mark Rewston	17					
29	Simon Willis	15					
30	Paul Williams	14					
31	Jason Long	11					
32	Neil Amber	9					
33	Nigel White	5					
34	Paul Davies	4					
34	Kevin McComas	4					
36	Nathan Hicks	3					
36	Nathan Jenkins	3					
38	Geraint Lewis	2					
38	Daniel Cluroe	2					
38	John Williams	2					
38	Leighton Prosser	2					
38	Paul Strange	2					
43	Ian Barrett	1					
43	Andrew Hiseman	1					
43	Lee Morris	1					
43	Peter Withers	1					
43	Lee Bennett	1					
43	Gareth Noble	1					
43	Jason Humphries	1					
43	Adrian Munkley	1					
43	Steven Willis	1					
43	Jason Donovan	1					
	'Penalty Tries'		2				10
	'Team Total'	30	65	31	9	29	501
