= 2000–01 Ystalyfera RFC season =

This season progressed without any real level of consistency up until Christmas and the new year. January, February and March however saw eight victories and only two defeats, both against the eventual Champions Cwmavon 5-20 and runners up Pontyberem 0-20. Within this run was a 69–15 home win against Kidwelly, 10 tries were scored, 8 converted by Gareth James, one short of the record 9 held by Leighton Stoneman. This run lifted the side to a creditable 4th place out of 12. Cup performances this year were of no great note. Captain for a second season was Stephen Munkley who also won Players Player of the year. Top points scorer Gareth James with 172 won Supporters Player of the year and Martyn Stoneman scored 7 tries – his last a fine individual effort away at Newcastle Emlyn during injury time. This was the last game of the season, earning a 29 all draw.

== National League Division 4 West ==
Pos.	Team.	PL.	W.	D.	L.	F.	A.	Bal.	Try.	Pts.	%.
1 P	Cwmavon	22	19	0	3	494	180	+314	69	57	86.36%
2	Pontyberem	22	16	1	5	490	306	+184	68	49	75.00%
3	Mumbles	22	12	1	9	421	347	+74	55	37	56.82%
4	Ystalyfera	22	11	2	9	448	394	+54	55	35	54.55%
5	Newcastle Emlyn	22	11	2	9	348	332	+16	46	35	54.55%
6	Haverfordwest	22	11	1	10	371	359	-12	52	34	52.27%
7	Tumble	22	10	1	11	364	386	-22	47	31	47.73%
8	Skewen	22	9	1	12	382	418	-36	58	28	43.18%
9	Aberystwyth	22	9	1	12	378	376	+2	46	28	43.18%
10	Bynea	22	8	1	13	272	375	-103	27	25	38.64%
11	Kidwelly	22	6	1	15	334	530	-196	41	19	29.55%
12 R	Brynamman	22	4	0	18	333	631	-298	44	12	18.18%

== Ystalyfera 2000/01 Season Results ==
No.	Date.	Fixture.	Venue.	Opponents.	Result.	F - A.
1	26 Aug.	Friendly	Home	Waunarlwydd	Lost	24 - 31
	2 Sep.	W Cup 1stRd	Home	Llanelli Wanderers		walkover
2	9 Sep.	League	Home	Bynea	Won	26 - 13
3	16 Sept.	League	Home	Cwmavon	Lost	23 - 32
4	23 Sep.	WCup 2ndRd	Home	Lampeter Town	Won	24 - 17
5	30 Sep.	League	Away	Tumble	Lost	15 - 41
6	7 Oct.	League	Away	Brynamman	Won	34 - 25
7	14 Oct.	WCup 3Rd	Home	Tylorstown	Lost	11 - 19
8	21 Oct.	League	Home	Aberystwyth	Won	19 - 15
	23 Oct.	WWCup 1Rd	Away	Trimsaran		Scratched
9	2 Dec.	League	Home	Pontyberem	Lost	3 - 9
10	16 Dec.	League	Away	Haverfordwest	Lost	6 - 27
11	23 Dec.	League	Home	Newcastle Emlyn	Won	36 - 5
12	6 Jan.	League	Away	Cwmavon	Lost	5 - 20
13	13 Jan.	League	Home	Tumble	Won	42 - 12
14	20 Jan.	League	Home	Brynamman	Won	15 - 12
15	27 Jan.	League	Away	Aberystwyth	Drew	9 - 9
16	2 feb.	League	Away	Bynea	Won	35 - 3
17	10 Feb.	League	Home	Skewen	Won	19 - 5
18	24 Feb.	League	Home	Kidwelly	Won	69 - 15
19	10 Mar.	League	Away	Kidwelly	Won	21 - 15
20	24 Mar.	League	Home	Mumbles	Won	12 - 5
21	31 Mar.	League	Away	Pontyberem	Lost	0 - 20
22	7 Apr.	League	Away	Skewen	Lost	13 - 31
23	10 Apr.	SVCup 1stRd	Away	Alltwen	Won	29 - 7
24	14 Apr.	League	Home	Haverfordwest	Lost	11 - 29
25	1 May.	SVCup Final	Home	Vardre	Lost	15 - 41
26	9 May.	League	Away	Mumbles	Lost	6 - 22
27	21 May.	League	Away	Newcastle Emlyn	Drew	29 - 29
						551 - 509

== Ystalyfera 2000/01 Season Player Stats ==
43.	Player.	PL.	Tries.	Cons.	DGls.	Pens.	Tot Pts.
1	Gareth James	27	3	29	1	32	172
2	Mike Morgan	14	4	7	1	10	67
3	Martyn Stoneman	24	7				35
4	Kevin McComas	18	6				30
5	John Williams	24	6				30
6	Simon Donovan	15	5				25
7	Stephen Munkley Captain	19	5				25
8	Mark McComas	25	5				25
9	Arwel Williams	22	4				20
10	Leighton Stoneman	17	3				15
11	Jason Humphries	19	3				15
12	Phillip Thomas	26	3				15
13	Damian James	5	2	1			12
14	Kevin Williams	23	2				10
15	Phillip Stoneman	24	2				10
16	Nick Mabbutt	8	1				5
16	Mark Rewston	8	1				5
18	Leighton Prosser	13	1				5
19	Jason Donovan	16	1				5
20	Jason Long	18	1				5
20	Peter Abraham	18	1				5
22	Alun Guerrier	20	1				5
23	Neil Brown	26					
24	Ian Barrett	17					
25	Craig Lloyd	13					
26	Simon Willis	8					
27	Andrew Williams	7					
27	Stephen Morgan	7					
29	Alan Williams	4					
29	Ian Morgan	4					
29	Martin Jones	4					
32	Andrew Hiseman	2					
32	Andrew Key	2					
32	Christopher Hicks	2					
35	Gary Guppy	1					
36	Jason Lewis	1					
35	Mark Orford	1					
35	Neil Amber	1					
35	Geraint Lewis	1					
35	Ashley Carter	1					
35	Glen Charles	1					
35	Lee Morris	1					
35	Anthony Rees	1					
	'Penalty Tries'		2				10
	'Team Total'	27	69	37	2	42	551
