= 2006–07 Ystalyfera RFC season =

The start of season 2006–07 in Division Four South West was in contrast with the somewhat traditional – "good start – poor Christmas/New year – with a good end to the season". Up to the end of November six league games had been lost with a single victory at home to Trebanos. The only other win was a Swansea Valley 1st Round home game versus Alltwen. In December to February team confidence did rally and five wins, two draws and only two defeats saw the side lift itself up, finishing the season with three wins in the last four games and a respectable 7th place out of 12. Welsh Cup progress was a dismal 1st Round defeat at home to district side Trefil and the West Wales Shield Merit Table finish 21st out of 31. The Swansea Valley Cup effort was a final versus Vardre up at Cwmtwrch, which we lost 13–8. Ystalyfera were completely outplayed by their much classier opponents.

Captain this season was the reliable Alun Guerrier, and top points scorer was Andrew Spratt with an accumulative 142 points. Top try scorer was the young Mathew Scott with 12. Jonathan Evans won both the Players Player and Supporters Player of the year awards.

== National League Division 4 South West ==
| Pos. | Team. | PL. | W. | D. | L. | F. | A. | Bal. | Try. | Pts. | %. |
|---|---|---|---|---|---|---|---|---|---|---|---|
| 1 P | B.P.Llandarcy | 22 | 20 | 0 | 2 | 719 | 230 | +489 | 105 | 60 | 90.91% |
| 2 P | Briton Ferry | 22 | 19 | 0 | 3 | 688 | 262 | +426 | 97 | 57 | 86.36% |
| 3 | Glynneath | 22 | 16 | 0 | 6 | 628 | 380 | +248 | 84 | 48 | 72.73% |
| 4 | Taibach............-3pts | 22 | 13 | 0 | 9 | 557 | 415 | +142 | 80 | 36 | 59.09% |
| 5 | Pontycymmer | 22 | 11 | 0 | 11 | 463 | 322 | +141 | 63 | 33 | 50.00% |
| 6 | Abercrave | 22 | 10 | 1 | 11 | 388 | 439 | -51 | 50 | 31 | 47.73% |
| 7 | Ystalyfera | 22 | 9 | 2 | 11 | 339 | 461 | -122 | 41 | 29 | 45.45% |
| 8 | Llantwit Major | 22 | 8 | 1 | 13 | 333 | 380 | -47 | 43 | 25 | 38.64% |
| 9 | Birchgrove | 22 | 8 | 0 | 14 | 302 | 547 | -245 | 41 | 24 | 36.36% |
| 10 | Resolven | 22 | 7 | 1 | 14 | 412 | 687 | -275 | 52 | 22 | 34.09% |
| 11 R | Trebanos | 22 | 6 | 0 | 16 | 350 | 655 | -305 | 41 | 18 | 27.27% |
| 12 R | Alltwen............-3pts | 22 | 2 | 1 | 19 | 256 | 657 | -401 | 27 | 4 | 11.36% |

== Ystalyfera 2006/07 Season Results ==
| No. | Date. | Fixture. | Venue. | Opponents. | Result. | F - A. |
| 1 | 24 Aug. | Friendly | Home | Penlan | Lost | 5 - 7 |
| 2 | 2 Sep. | League | Away | Pontycymmer | Lost | 3 - 18 |
| 3 | 9 Sep. | W Cup 1st Rd | Home | Trefil | Lost | 10 - 12 |
| 4 | 16 Sept. | League | Home | Trebanos | Won | 22 - 9 |
| 5 | 23 Sept. | League | Away | Abercrave | Lost | 8 - 46 |
| 6 | 7 Oct. | League | Home | Glynneath | Lost | 17 - 32 |
| 7 | 14 Oct. | League | Away | Briton Ferry | Lost | 7 - 46 |
| 8 | 21 Oct. | SV Cup 1st Rd | Home | Alltwen | Won | 12 - 3 |
| 9 | 28 Oct. | League | Home | Taibach | Lost | 10 - 29 |
| 10 | 18 Nov. | League | Away | B.P.Llandarcy | Lost | 9 - 26 |
| 11 | 2 Dec. | League | Home | Alltwen | Won | 13 - 7 |
| 12 | 9 Dec. | League | Away | Resolven | Drew | 22 - 22 |
| 13 | 16 Dec. | League | Away | Llantwit Major | Lost | 10 - 29 |
| 14 | 23 Dec. | League | Home | Birchgrove | Won | 29 - 0 |
| 15 | 6 Jan. | League | Home | Pontycymmer | Won | 17 - 7 |
| 16 | 13 Jan. | League | Away | Trebanos | Won | 17 - 12 |
| 17 | 20 Jan. | League | Home | Abercrave | Drew | 10 - 10 |
| 18 | 27 Jan. | League | Away | Glynneath | Lost | 17 - 36 |
| 19 | 3 Feb. | League | Home | Briton Ferry | Won | 26 - 19 |
| 20 | 17 Feb. | League | Away | Taibach | Lost | 10 - 43 |
| 21 | 3 Mar. | League | Home | B.P.Llandarcy | Lost | 11 - 19 |
| 22 | 24 Mar. | League | Away | Alltwen | Won | 10 - 3 |
| 23 | 31 Mar. | League | Home | Resolven | Won | 42 - 17 |
| 24 | 14 Apr. | League | Away | Birchgrove | Lost | 9 - 20 |
| 25 | 28 Apr. | League | Home | Llantwit Major | Won | 20 - 11 |
| 26 | 2 May. | SV Cup SF | Home | Trebanos | Won | 37 - 13 |
| 27 | 10 May. | SV Cup F | Cwmtwrch | Vardre | Lost | 8 - 13 |
| | | | | | | 411 - 509 |

== Ystalyfera 2006/07 Season Player Stats ==
| 47. | Player. | PL. | Tries. | Cons. | DGls. | Pens. | Tot Pts. |
| 1 | Andrew Spratt | 22 | 5 | 24 | | 23 | 142 |
| 2 | Mathew Scott | 22 | 12 | | 1 | | 63 |
| 3 | Jonathan Morgan | 18 | 4 | 2 | | 2 | 30 |
| 4 | Martyn Stoneman | 23 | 4 | 1 | | 2 | 28 |
| 5 | Mark Rewston | 26 | 4 | | | | 20 |
| 6 | Alun Guerrier Captain | 27 | 3 | | | | 15 |
| 7 | Paul Davies | 20 | 3 | | | | 15 |
| 8 | Graham Jones | 26 | 2 | | | | 10 |
| 9 | David Thomas | 11 | 2 | | | | 10 |
| 10 | Damian James | 5 | 2 | | | | 10 |
| 11 | Ashley Carter | 1 | 2 | | | | 10 |
| 12 | Gareth James | 1 | | 2 | | 2 | 10 |
| 13 | Nathan Hicks | 25 | 1 | | | 1 | 8 |
| 14 | Simon Chatham | 17 | 1 | | | | 5 |
| 15 | Nigel White | 13 | 1 | | | | 5 |
| 16 | Kevin Williams | 12 | 1 | | | | 5 |
| 17 | Aaron Davies | 6 | 1 | | | | 5 |
| 18 | David Price | 3 | 1 | | | | 5 |
| 19 | Darren Chick | 1 | 1 | | | | 5 |
| 20 | Steven Myers | 23 | | | | | |
| 21 | Jonathan Evans | 20 | | | | | |
| 21 | Leighton Prosser | 20 | | | | | |
| 23 | Mark Orford | 19 | | | | | |
| 24 | Aled Watkins | 14 | | | | | |
| 25 | Craig Lloyd | 13 | | | | | |
| 26 | Arwel Williams | 12 | | | | | |
| 26 | Neil Brown | 12 | | | | | |
| 28 | John Williams | 11 | | | | | |
| 29 | Neil Lynch | 10 | | | | | |
| 29 | Nick Stevens | 10 | | | | | |
| 29 | Steven Munkley | 10 | | | | | |
| 32 | Robert Bevan | 9 | | | | | |
| 32 | Keiran Lloyd | 9 | | | | | |
| 34 | Christopher Hicks | 8 | | | | | |
| 35 | Craig Colegate | 7 | | | | | |
| 36 | Sam Jones | 6 | | | | | |
| 37 | Steven Rees | 5 | | | | | |
| 38 | David Hawkins | 4 | | | | | |
| 38 | Phillip Thomas | 4 | | | | | |
| 40 | Nick Mainwaring | 3 | | | | | |
| 40 | Peter Abraham | 3 | | | | | |
| 40 | Simon Willis | 3 | | | | | |
| 40 | Darren Rees | 2 | | | | | |
| 44 | Joe Roberts | 1 | | | | | |
| 44 | Ross Kelsey | 1 | | | | | |
| 44 | Gareth Noble | 1 | | | | | |
| 44 | Christopher Thomas | 1 | | | | | |
| | 'Penalty Tries' | | 2 | | | | 10 |
| | 'Team Total' | 26 | 52 | 29 | 1 | 30 | 411 |
