= 2007–08 Ystalyfera RFC season =

The 2007–08 Ystalyfera RFC season was a further season of re-building with new, young players. The team began well with six wins and only two defeats into October. Unfortunately these defeats were two league games where the players performed admirably but were denied the results – Taibach home 5–8 and Bryncoch away 13–17. The Swansea Valley Cup provided Preliminary and 1st Round wins over Trebanos away 19–3 and Alltwen away 32–21. The Welsh Cup started with a Preliminary Round win over Skewen at Ynysydarren 26–14 only to lose at home 11–20 to Cardiff side Fairwater.

Despite a resounding 44–8 win at home to Hirwaun getting 6 tries, the lack of consistency resulted in the loss of the next three league games. This left the 'Fera in the position of one win and five defeats, however the never say never attitude came to the front and consecutive victories over Pontycymmer 27–5, Resolven 16–15 away and Neath Athletic 3–0 at home stabilised the situation and left Ystalyfera mid table at the end of 2007. The New Year started again with the inability to apply and maintain team strengths and another three defeats was the outcome. Home wins over local rivals Abercrave 28–23 and Brynamman 23–17 again lifted the side in time for the Easter Tour to Halifax. This trip was a blessing in disguise for after returning Ystalyfera only lost another two games, notching up four wins and an amazing 34 all draw with Resolven. In this game Damian James and Phillip Thomas got two tries apiece, Jesse Patton a try and Mathew Scott kicking a penalty and three conversions. This form was to prove a beacon for the forthcoming season when the players in belief of their ability would achieve success.

On 15 April Ystalyfera were denied in a Swansea Valley Cup Semi-Final by our always 'bogey' side in the competition Abercrave 7–8 at home. Mathew Scott had scored a try which Damian James converted, but a period when two front row players were 'sin binned' off the field gave the visitors an opportunity and a try plus a penalty gave them the result. Captain this season was the inspiring Paul Davies, top scorer was Jason Addey with 91 points closely followed by the ever present Damian James with 85. Leading try scorer was the much-experienced Phillip Thomas with 10 tries, Mathew Scott just short with 9.

Players Player of the year was Jonathan Evans for the second season and the Supporters favourite was Mathew Scott.

== National League Division 4 South West ==
Pos.	Team.	PL.	W.	D.	L.	F.	A.	Bon.	Try.	Pts.	%.
1 P	Glynneath	22	18	0	4	541	246	12	69	84	81.82%
2 P	Maesteg Celtic	22	17	1	4	428	243	8	54	78	79.55%
3	Taibach	22	16	0	6	502	345	8	65	72	72.73%
4	Bryncoch	22	16	1	5	415	348	6	57	72	75.00%
5	Brynamman	22	11	0	11	477	353	12	58	56	50.00%
6	Ystalyfera	22	10	1	11	356	374	10	45	52	47.73%
7	Glyncorrwg	22	10	0	12	364	319	12	44	52	45.45%
8	Pontycymmer	22	9	1	12	291	404	4	20	42	43.18%
9	Neath Athletic	22	7	0	15	311	449	8	35	36	31.82%
10	Resolven	22	6	1	15	369	509	9	53	35	29.55%
11 R	Hirwaun	22	4	0	18	290	471	8	41	24	18.18%
12 R	Abercrave	22	5	1	16	260	543	2	33	24	25.00%

== Ystalyfera 2007/08 Season Results ==
No.	Date.	Fixture.	Venue.	Opponents.	Result.	F – A.
1	17 Aug.	Trial	Home	Tonna	Won	19 – 12
2	21 Aug.	Friendly	Home	Morriston	Won	12 – 10
3	25 Aug.	SV Cup Prelim Rd	Away	Trebanos	Won	19 – 3
4	1 Sept.	League	Home	Taibach	Lost	5 – 8
5	8 Sept.	League	Away	Bryncoch	Lost	13 – 17
6	22 Sept.	League	Home	Hirwaun	Won	44 – 8
7	29 Sept.	W Cup Prelim Rd	Home	Skewen	Won	26 – 14
8	6 Oct.	SV Cup 1Rd	Away	Alltwen	Won	32 – 21
9	13 Oct.	League	Away	Abercrave	Lost	10 – 11
10	20 Oct.	League	Home	Brynamman	Lost	12 – 22
11	27 Oct.	W Cup 1 Rd	Home	Fairwater	Lost	11 – 20
12	3 Nov.	League	Away	Glynneath	Lost	3 – 31
13	10 Nov.	League	Home	Pontycymmer	Won	27 – 5
14	15 Dec.	League	Away	Resolven	Won	16 – 15
15	29 Dec.	League	Home	Neath Athletic	Won	3 – 0
16	5 Jan.	League	Away	Maesteg Celtic	Lost	11 – 18
17	12 Jan.	League	Away	Taibach	Lost	0 – 31
18	26 Jan.	League	Away	Hirwaun	Lost	8 – 10
19	16 Feb.	League	Home	Abercrave	Won	28 – 23
20	1 Mar.	League	Away	Brynamman	Won	23 – 17
21	7 Mar.	League	Home	Glynneath	Lost	7 – 20
22	29 Mar.	League	Away	Pontycymmer	Lost	16 – 21
23	5 Apr.	League	Home	Resolven	Drew	34 – 34
24	12 Apr.	League	Away	Glyncorrwg	Won	19 – 12
25	15 Apr.	SV Cup SF	Home	Abercrave	Lost	7 – 8
26	19 Apr.	League	Away	Neath Athletic	Won	29 – 18
27	26 Apr.	League	Home	Maesteg Celtic	Lost	20 – 29
28	30 Apr.	League	Home	Bryncoch	Won	15 – 14
29	3 May.	League	Home	Glyncorrwg	Won	13 – 10
						482 – 462

== Ystalyfera 2007/08 Season Player Stats ==
41.	Player.	PL.	Tries.	Cons.	DGls.	Pens.	Tot Pts.
1	Jason Addey	25	5	15	0	12	91
2	Damian James	22	5	6	3	13	85
3	Mathew Scott	28	9	6	1	1	63
4	Phillip Thomas	29	10				50
5	Andrew Spratt	25	5	2		4	41
6	Jonathan Evans	25	5				25
7	Graham Jones	24	3				15
8	Martyn Stoneman	15	1	2		2	15
9	Arwel Williams	12	3				15
10	Jesse Patton	29	2				10
11	Tristian Davies	23	2				10
12	Simon Chatham	19	2				10
13	Mark Rewston	15	2				10
14	Aaron Davies	13	2				10
15	Mathew Dunne	10	2				10
16	Paul Davies Captain	26	1				5
17	Ryan Evans	24	1				5
18	Daniel White	11	1				5
19	Nick Stevens	8	1				5
20	Gareth James	2		1			2
21	Kieran Lloyd	24					
21	Alun Guerrier	24					
23	Aled Watkins	21					
24	Steven Myers	20					
25	Chris Baron	18					
26	Neil Brown	16					
26	Craig Lloyd	16					
26	Jonathan Williams	16					
29	Steven Munkley	13					
30	Steffan Jones	10					
30	Nathan Hicks	10					
32	Jonathan Morgan	7					
32	Mark Orford	7					
34	Phillip John Stephens	5					
34	Simon Dunne	5					
36	Sam Jones	3					
36	Jason Humphries	3					
38	Christopher Jenkins	2					
38	Lyndon Osborne	2					
40	Leighton Prosser	1					
40	David Thomas	1					
	'Penalty Tries'		0				
	'Team Total'	29	62	32	4	32	482
