= 1998–99 Ystalyfera RFC season =

After an early exit from the West Wales Cup at Llangennech, and a 1st Round exit from the Welsh Cup at Blaengarw, a third defeat away in the league at Nelson spurred the side and Ystalyfera began to dominate their opponents. A 19 match consecutive run of league victories followed which completely outpaced our rivals. The side was well balanced and quick handling of the ball overpowered other teams. Captain for the previous three years Kevin Williams had gone to Cwmllynfell and Peter Abraham was elected in his place. Former players like John Williams and Mark and Kevin McComas had returned. The younger crop of players had matured and top points scorer with 282 - a new club record was Michael Morgan. Damien James had 117 and a try count of 23 – one behind his father Noir James' record. Wayne Jones won all the player of the year awards. This outstanding season, our Third as champions, was climaxed by our only win of the Swansea Valley Cup, the elusive trophy that had constantly slipped from our grasp. This was achieved at Morriston against Abercrave, who have over time proved to be a bogey side for Ystalyfera, but not this season – 'Fera won 22-11. Other records this season was an unbeaten run of 18 games between October 98 to May 99, and the longest unbeaten run at home of 22 games between December 97 to October 99.

== National League Division 5 Central ==
| Pos. | Team. | PL. | W. | D. | L. | F. | A. | Try. | Bon. | Pts. | %. |
|---|---|---|---|---|---|---|---|---|---|---|---|
| 1 P | Ystalyfera | 24 | 22 | 0 | 2 | 628 | 270 | 90 | 13 | 79 | 91.67% |
| 2 P | Nelson | 24 | 16 | 2 | 6 | 502 | 294 | 72 | 12 | 62 | 70.83% |
| 3 | Rhydyfelin | 24 | 16 | 1 | 7 | 958 | 351 | 98 | 12 | 61 | 68.75% |
| 4 | Heol y Cyw | 24 | 13 | 1 | 10 | 454 | 816 | 68 | 6 | 46 | 56.25% |
| 5 | Bridgend Athletic | 24 | 13 | 0 | 11 | 492 | 438 | 57 | 5 | 44 | 54.17% |
| 6 | Nantyffyllon | 24 | 12 | 1 | 11 | 480 | 459 | 56 | 7 | 44 | 52.08% |
| 7 | Cefn Coed | 24 | 10 | 4 | 10 | 398 | 384 | 52 | 5 | 39 | 50.00% |
| 8 | Tylorstown | 24 | 11 | 0 | 13 | 354 | 455 | 44 | 5 | 38 | 45.83% |
| 9 | Aberdare | 24 | 10 | 0 | 14 | 385 | 389 | 50 | 7 | 37 | 41.67% |
| 10 | Senghenydd | 24 | 9 | 2 | 13 | 492 | 534 | 71 | 8 | 37 | 41.67% |
| 11 | Neath Athletic | 24 | 8 | 0 | 16 | 349 | 489 | 40 | 5 | 29 | 33.33% |
| 12 R | Cwmgwrach | 24 | 6 | 1 | 17 | 402 | 521 | 54 | 8 | 27 | 27.08% |
| 13 R | Banwen..........-6pts | 24 | 4 | 0 | 20 | 321 | 817 | 41 | 4 | 10 | 16.67% |

== Ystalyfera 1998/99 Season Results ==
| No. | Date. | Fixture. | Venue. | Opponents. | Result. | F - A. |
| 1 | 22 Aug. | Friendly | Away | Trebanos | Won | 68 - 5 |
| 2 | 29 Aug. | WW Cup PreRd | Away | Llangennech | Lost | 22 - 34 |
| 3 | 5 Sep. | League | Home | Rhydyfelin | Won | 36 - 17 |
| 4 | 12 Sep. | League | Away | Nantyffyllon | Won | 25 - 17 |
| 5 | 19 Sep. | League | Home | Banwen | Won | 52 - 15 |
| 6 | 26 Sep. | W Cup 1stRd | Away | Blaengarw | Lost | 5 - 44 |
| 7 | 29 Sep. | SV Cup PreRd | Away | Trebanos | Won | 37 - 10 |
| 8 | 2 Oct. | league | Away | Nelson | Lost | 10 - 13 |
| 9 | 10 Oct. | League | Away | Cwmgwrach | Won | 18 - 16 |
| 10 | 17 Oct. | League | Home | Heol Y Cyw | Won | 35 - 5 |
| 11 | 7 Nov. | League | Home | Aberdare | Won | 16 - 10 |
| 12 | 21 Nov. | League | Away | Neath Athletic | Won | 23 - 9 |
| 13 | 28 Nov. | League | Away | Senghenydd | Won | 32 - 8 |
| 14 | 12 Dec. | League | Home | Tylorstown | Won | 28 - 3 |
| 15 | 19 Dec. | League | Away | Bridgend Athletic | Won | 28 - 8 |
| 16 | 2 Jan. | League | Home | Cefn Coed | Won | 34 - 7 |
| 17 | 9 Jan. | League | Away | Rhydyfelin | Won | 14 - 12 |
| 18 | 16 Jan. | League | Home | Nantyffyllon | Won | 26 - 17 |
| 19 | 30 Jan. | League | Home | Nelson | Won | 36 - 0 |
| 20 | 13 Feb. | League | Home | Cwmgwrach | Won | 35 - 0 |
| 21 | 13 Mar. | League | Home | Senghenydd | Won | 26 - 10 |
| 22 | 20 Mar. | League | Away | Aberdare | Won | 10 - 6 |
| 23 | 27 Mar. | League | Home | Neath Athletic | Won | 16 - 13 |
| 24 | 31 Mar. | SV Cup SF | Home | Vardre | Drew | 23 - 23 |
| 25 | 7 Apr. | SilverBall QF | Briton Ferry | Nantymoel | Lost | 20 - 36 |
| 26 | 13 Apr. | League | Away | Banwen | Won | 48 - 15 |
| 27 | 17 Apr. | League | Away | Tylorstown | Won | 29 - 21 |
| 28 | 24 Apr. | League | Home | Bridgend Athletic | Won | 22 - 3 |
| | 1 May. | League | Away | Cefn Coed | Abandoned | 17 - 12 |
| 29 | 5 May. | SVCup Final | Morriston | Abercrave | Won | 22 - 11 |
| 30 | 12 May. | League | Away | Heol Y Cyw | Lost | 14 - 33 |
| 31 | 13 May. | League | Away | Cefn Coed | Won | 13 - 12 |
| | | | | | | 820 - 445 |

== Ystalyfera 1998/99 Season Player Stats ==
| 44. | Player. | PL. | Tries. | Cons. | DGls. | Pens. | Tot Pts. |
| 1 | Mike Morgan | 30 | 13 | 47 | 2 | 39 | 282 |
| 2 | Damian James | 31 | 23 | 1 | | | 117 |
| 3 | Wayne Jones | 29 | 18 | | | | 90 |
| 4 | John Williams | 29 | 9 | | | | 45 |
| 5 | Martyn Stoneman | 27 | 6 | | | 2 | 36 |
| 6 | Leighton Stoneman | 28 | 7 | | | | 35 |
| 7 | Phillip Stoneman | 31 | 6 | | | | 30 |
| 8 | Neil Orme | 12 | 5 | | | | 25 |
| 9 | Alan Williams | 14 | 4 | | | | 20 |
| 10 | Mark McComas | 30 | 3 | | | | 15 |
| 11 | Craig Lloyd | 30 | 3 | | | | 15 |
| 12 | Peter Abraham Captain | 31 | 3 | | | | 15 |
| 13 | David Thomas | 7 | 2 | | | | 10 |
| 14 | Andrew Hiseman | 9 | 2 | | | | 10 |
| 15 | Ian Morgan | 13 | 2 | | | | 10 |
| 16 | Kevin McComas | 25 | 2 | | | | 10 |
| 17 | Jason Humphries | 30 | 2 | | | | 10 |
| 18 | Ceri Morgan | 8 | 1 | | | | 5 |
| 19 | Simon Willis | 22 | 1 | | | | 5 |
| 19 | Neil Brown | 22 | 1 | | | | 5 |
| 21 | Mark Rewston | 25 | 1 | | | | 5 |
| 22 | Phillip Thomas | 29 | 1 | | | | 5 |
| 23 | Alun Guerrier | 31 | 1 | | | | 5 |
| 24 | Andrew Williams | 30 | | | | | |
| 25 | Steven Morgan | 15 | | | | | |
| 26 | Jason Long | 12 | | | | | |
| 27 | Paul Burnett | 10 | | | | | |
| 28 | Martin Jones | 8 | | | | | |
| 29 | Hywel Ace | 4 | | | | | |
| 30 | Neil Lynch | 3 | | | | | |
| 30 | Ryan Jones | 3 | | | | | |
| 32 | Keith Ellingham | 2 | | | | | |
| 32 | Mark Orford | 2 | | | | | |
| 32 | Joe Roberts | 2 | | | | | |
| 35 | Lee Francis | 1 | | | | | |
| 35 | Gary Guppy | 1 | | | | | |
| 35 | Luke Ace | 1 | | | | | |
| 35 | Hywel Williams | 1 | | | | | |
| 35 | Shane Tucker | 1 | | | | | |
| 35 | Glen Charles | 1 | | | | | |
| 35 | Nick Mabbutt | 1 | | | | | |
| 35 | Adrian Munkley | 1 | | | | | |
| 35 | Will Close | 1 | | | | | |
| 35 | Paul Watkins | 1 | | | | | |
| | 'Penalty Tries' | | 3 | | | | 15 |
| | 'Team Total' | 31 | 119 | 48 | 2 | 41 | 820 |
