= 2001–02 Ystalyfera RFC season =

At the start of this season two home victories against Kenfig Hill 39-17 and Kidwelly 31-16, contrasted against big away defeats at Mumbles 26-60, Tumble 3-29, Aberystwyth 5-55 and Blaengarw 6-45. This left Ystalyfera at the lower end of the league table at the end of November, and only great efforts from the players starting with a hard fought win away at Waunarlwydd 14-11, turned things around. Four consecutive victories before the new year plus seven wins in March and April saw Ystalyfera eventually finish 6th out of 16. Cup success was restricted to the Swansea Valley Cup where the ‘Fera lost another final this time at home to Vardre 10-17. Captain this season was Craig Lloyd, top points scorer Damian James with 144 points and top try scorer Phillip Thomas with 15. Phillip won Players Player and Ashley Carter got the Supporters vote.

== National League Division 4 West ==
Pos.	Team.	PL.	W.	D.	L.	F.	A.	Bal.	Try.	Pts.	%.
1 P	Aberystwyth	26	22	0	4	857	373	+484	119	66	84.62%
2 P	Newcastle Emlyn	26	20	0	6	695	312	+383	102	60	76.92%
3 P	Waunarlwydd	26	18	2	6	807	425	+382	114	56	73.09%
4	Pontyberem	26	17	3	6	526	309	+217	75	54	71.15%
5	Skewen	26	13	1	12	587	572	+15	87	40	51.92%
6	Ystalyfera	26	13	1	12	506	601	-95	66	40	51.92%
7	Tumble..........-3pts	26	14	0	12	439	571	-132	49	39	53.85%
8	Mumbles	26	12	1	13	456	533	-77	53	37	48.08%
9	Blaengarw	26	11	1	14	506	499	+7	62	34	44.23%
10	Haverfordwest	26	9	2	15	406	574	-168	52	29	38.46%
11	Kidwelly	26	9	1	16	440	576	-136	48	28	36.54%
12	Gorseinon	26	8	0	18	521	517	+4	64	24	30.77%
13	Kenfig Hill	26	8	0	18	362	671	-309	42	24	30.77%
14 R	Bynea	26	2	0	24	298	876	-578	37	6	7.69%

== Ystalyfera 2001/02 Season Results ==
No.	Date.	Fixture.	Venue.	Opponents.	Result.	F - A.
1	1 Sep.	WCup PreRd	Home	Penallta	Lost	12 - 31
2	8 Sep.	League	Home	Gorseinon	Lost	18 - 23
3	15 Sep.	League	Away	Mumbles	Lost	26 - 60
4	29 Sept.	League	Home	Kenfig Hill	Won	39 - 17
5	6 Oct.	League	Home	Tumble	Lost	3 - 29
6	20 Oct.	SV Cup PreRd	Home	Pontardawe	Won	32 - 15
7	27 Oct.	League	Away	Aberystwyth	Lost	5 - 55
8	3 Nov.	League	Home	Kidwelly	Won	31 - 16
9	10 Nov.	League	Away	Blaengarw	lost	6 - 45
10	17 Nov.	League	Home	Pontyberem	Lost	17 - 27
11	24 Nov.	League	Away	Waunarlwydd	Won	14 - 11
12	8 Dec.	League	Home	Newcastle Emlyn	Won	11 - 10
13	22 Dec.	Friendly	Home	Brynamman	Won	33 - 19
14	27 Dec.	WWCup 2ndRd	Home	Tycroes	Won	37 - 17
15	29 Dec.	League	Home	Bynea	Won	12 - 5
16	12 Jan.	League	Away	Gorseinon	Won	28 - 18
17	19 Jan.	League	Home	Mumbles	Lost	14 - 26
18	9 feb.	League	Away	Tumble	Lost	10 - 23
19	17 Feb.	WWCup 3rdRd	Home	Trimsaran	Lost	7 - 10
20	1 Mar.	League	Away	Skewen	Won	27 - 10
21	9 Mar.	League	Away	Kidwelly	Lost	22 - 31
22	16 Mar.	League	Home	Blaengarw	Won	26 - 22
23	22 Mar.	League	Away	Kenfig Hill	Won	14 - 12
24	30 Mar.	League	Away	Pontyberem	Drew	16 - 16
	10 Apr.	SVCup 1stRd	Home	Glais		walkover
25	13 Apr.	League	Home	Haverfordwest	Won	48 - 17
26	17 Apr.	League	Away	Haverfordwest	Won	12 - 10
27	20 Apr.	League	Away	Newcastle Emlyn	Lost	17 - 33
28	24 Apr.	League	Home	Aberystwyth	Won	31 - 20
29	27 Apr.	League	Home	Skewen	Lost	17 - 24
30	30 Apr.	League	Home	Waunarlwydd	Lost	8 - 20
31	4 May.	League	Away	Bynea	Won	25 - 20
	7 May.	SVCup SF	Home	Abercrave		walkover
32	19 May.	SVCup Final	Home	Vardre	Lost	10 - 17
						637 - 710

== Ystalyfera 2001/02 Season Player Stats ==
53.	Player.	PL.	Tries.	Cons.	DGls.	Pens.	Tot Pts.
1	Damian James	29	12	18	3	13	144
2	Phillip Thomas	31	15				75
3	Gareth James	13		15	1	10	63
4	Ashley Carter	28	8				40
5	Martyn Stoneman	31	3	6	2	1	36
6	Kevin Williams	26	7				35
7	Simon Donovan	11	6				30
8	Paul Davies	26	6				30
8	Mark McComas	26	6				30
10	Alan Williams	21	4				20
11	Leighton Prosser	20	3				15
12	Leighton Stoneman	24	1	5			15
13	Peter Abraham	18	1			2	11
14	John Daniels	2		2		2	10
15	Jason Humphries	20	2				10
16	Phillip Stoneman	26	2				10
17	John Williams	30	2				10
18	David Hawkins	2	1				5
18	Graham Jones	2	1				5
20	Andrew Hiseman	3	1				5
20	Ian Barrett	3	1				5
22	Jason Donovan	5	1				5
23	Mark Rewston	6	1				5
24	Alun Guerrier	14	1				5
25	Craig Lloyd Captain	26	1				5
26	Ian Morgan	2				1	3
27	Neil brown	24					
28	David Thomas	20					
29	Jason Long	17					
30	Neil Amber	14					
31	Paul Williams	11					
32	Martin Jones	10					
33	Andrew Key	7					
34	Neil Lynch	6					
35	Kevin McComas	5					
36	Arwel Williams	4					
37	Jonathan Evans	3					
37	Simon Chatham	3					
37	Geraint Lewis	3					
37	Alan Llewellyn	3					
41	Stephen Morgan	2					
41	Daniel Andrews	2					
41	Mike Morgan	2					
41	Joe Roberts	2					
45	Anthony Rees	1					
45	Christopher Hicks	1					
45	Tim Lewis	1					
45	Jason Thomas	1					
45	Mathew Gill	1					
45	Steven Munkley	1					
45	Andrew Williams	1					
45	Chris Partin	1					
45	Hywel Ace	1					
	'Penalty Tries'		2				10
	'Team Total'	32	88	46	8	27	637
