= Neil Lynch =

Neil Lynch may refer to:

- Neil Lynch (politician) (born 1934), Montana politician
- Neil L. Lynch (1930–2014), justice of the Massachusetts Supreme Judicial Court
- Neil Lynch, rugby player, see 2002–03 Ystalyfera RFC season
- Neil Lynch, member of the band, Moler

== See also ==
- Niall Lynch (disambiguation)
