= 1999–2000 Ystalyfera RFC season =

The confidence after promotion the previous season ensured a good start at a higher level, all six matches in September 1999 being victories. First defeat of the season was at home to Birchgrove who were to finish in 2nd place and promoted. Notable results and performances were regular, including the only home defeat over eventual champions Trimsaran 30–19, away victories at Haverfordwest 23–17, Mumbles 21-11 and Newcastle Emlyn 17–12. Big wins were against Aberystwyth 51–8, Kidwelly 33–15, Gowerton 60–12, Tumble 31-15 and Mumbles at home in the last game of the season with a highly entertaining 43–32. Ominously however at the latter end of the league campaign were comprehensive losses at Aberystwyth 5-46, 15–29 at Brynamman and Kidwelly 19–62. The 'rich' West Wales Cup results of recent seasons continued with wins at Ammanford 45-15 and an impressive 19–10 beating of Division two Bonymaen. Unfortunately the Semi-Final draw was again versus First Division Dunvant which was scratched. Players who had advanced their careers with other sides largely returned and Captain was Stephen Munkley. Top points scorer was Michael Morgan with 128 and Damian James scored a maximum 13 tries. Arwel Williams won both the Players Player and Supporters Player of the year awards. Impressively 49 players, all from Ystalyfera, appeared for the team in this season, a fact much envied by other teams at this level of the National League.

== National League Division 4 West ==
Pos.	Team.	PL.	W.	D.	L.	F.	A.	Bal.	Try.	Pts.	%.
1 P	Trimsaran	24	20	0	4	552	293	+259	72	60	83.33%
2 P	Birchgrove	24	16	1	7	448	277	+171	48	49	68.75%
3	Brynamman	24	15	1	8	630	477	+153	88	46	64.58%
4	Mumbles	24	15	1	8	473	363	+110	60	46	64.58%
5	Tumble	24	13	2	9	387	381	+6	43	41	58.33%
6	Pontyberem	24	13	1	10	492	296	+196	58	40	56.25%
7	Ystalyfera	24	12	2	10	507	483	+24	73	38	54.17%
8	Aberystwyth	24	10	0	14	470	393	+77	62	30	41.67%
9	Haverfordwest	24	10	0	14	423	461	-38	54	30	41.67%
10	Kidwelly	24	9	1	14	348	582	-234	41	28	39.58%
11	Newcastle Emlyn	24	9	0	15	354	502	-148	46	27	37.50%
12 R	Morriston..........-3pts	24	6	0	18	230	389	-159	28	15	25.00%
13 R	Gowerton	24	3	1	20	207	664	-457	24	10	14.58%

== Ystalyfera 1999/00 Season Results ==
No.	Date.	Fixture.	Venue.	Opponents.	Result.	F - A.
1	1 Sep.	Friendly	Away	Waunarlwydd	Won	31 - 19
2	4 Sep.	League	Away	Trimsaran	Won	30 - 19
3	11 Sep.	League	Away	Newcastle Emlyn	Won	17 - 12
4	14 Sep.	SV Cup PreRd	Home	Alltwen	Won	30 - 25
5	18 Sep.	League	Home	Morriston	Won	16 - 6
6	25 Sep.	W Cup 1stRd	Home	Talywain	Won	28 - 5
7	2 Oct.	League	Home	Pontyberem	Drew	13 - 13
8	16 Oct.	league	Home	Birchgrove	Lost	12 - 15
9	22 Oct.	Friendly	Home	1st Btn. Welsh Guards	Won	34 - 24
	24 Oct.	W Cup 2ndRd	Away	Tylorstown		Scratched
10	30 Oct.	League	Away	Gowerton	Lost	10 - 15
11	13 Nov.	League	Home	Aberystwyth	Won	51 - 8
12	20 Nov.	League	Away	Haverfordwest	Won	23 - 17
13	27 Nov.	League	Away	Brynamman	Lost	10 - 15
14	4 Dec.	League	Away	Mumbles	Won	21 - 11
15	18 Dec.	League	Home	Kidwelly	Won	33 - 15
16	3 Jan.	League	Away	Tumble	Lost	13 - 25
17	8 Jan.	League	Home	Trimsaran	Lost	15 - 17
18	15 Jan.	League	Home	Newcastle Emlyn	Won	35 - 27
19	22 Jan.	League	Away	Morriston	Lost	5 - 25
20	29 Jan.	League	Away	Pontyberem	Lost	0 - 24
21	12 Feb.	League	Home	Haverfordwest	Won	15 - 8
22	26 Feb.	League	Away	Birchgrove	Drew	15 - 15
23	11 Mar.	League	Home	Gowerton	Won	60 - 12
	14 Mar.	WW Cup 2ndRd	Away	Trebanos		Walkover
24	21 Mar.	WWCup 3rdRd	Home	Ammanford	Won	45 - 19
25	25 Mar.	League	Away	Aberystwyth	Lost	5 - 46
26	31 Mar.	SV Cup 1stRd	Away	Abercrave	Lost	22 - 30
27	5 Apr.	WW Cup QF	Home	Bonymaen	Won	19 - 10
28	8 Apr.	League	Home	Brynamman	Lost	15 - 29
29	29 Apr.	League	Away	Kidwelly	Lost	19 - 62
	3 May.	WW Cup SF	at Ystradgynlais	Dunvant		Scratched
30	6 May.	League	Home	Tumble	Won	31 - 15
31	9 May.	League	Home	Mumbles	Won	43 - 32
						716 - 615

== Ystalyfera 1999/00 Season Player Stats ==
49.	Player.	PL.	Tries.	Cons.	DGls.	Pens.	Tot Pts.
1	Mike Morgan	18	4	21	2	20	128
2	Damian James	18	13	4			73
3	Ryan Jones	9	3	16		3	56
4	Jason Donovan	27	11				55
5	Simon Donovan	22	8				40
6	Martyn Stoneman	21	4	3		1	29
7	Gareth James	5	1	5		4	27
8	Wayne Jones	13	5				25
9	Arwel Williams	21	5				25
10	Kevin Williams	17	4				20
10	Stephen Morgan	17	4				20
12	Ian Morgan	9	2	1		2	18
13	Christopher Hicks	9	3				15
14	Craig Lloyd	14	3				15
15	Stephen Munkley Captain	19	3				15
16	Simon Willis	25	3				15
17	Alun Guerrier	29	3				15
18	Phillip Thomas	31	3				15
19	Mark McComas	4	2				10
20	Alan Williams	14	2				10
21	Kevin McComas	17	2				10
22	Jason Long	18	2				10
23	Andrew Hiseman	20	2				10
24	Jason Humphries	23	2				10
25	Phillip Stoneman	28	2				10
26	Martin Jones	2	1				5
27	Andrew Key	5	1				5
28	Ceri Morgan	11	1				5
29	John Williams	18	1				5
30	Peter Abraham	22	1				5
31	Mark Rewston	25	1				5
32	Neil Brown	26					
33	Andrew Williams	17					
34	Neil Lynch	16					
35	Leighton Stoneman	8					
35	David Thomas	8					
37	Hywel Ace	6					
38	Lee Francis	4					
38	Paul Williams	4					
38	Geraint Lewis	4					
41	Hywel Williams	1					
41	Paul Burnett	1					
41	Allan Humphries	1					
41	Steven Williams	1					
41	Martyn Savage	1					
41	Glen Charles	1					
41	Nigel Price	1					
41	Nigel White	1					
41	Neil Amber	1					
	'Penalty Tries'		1				5
	'Team Total'	31	103	51	2	31	716
