= Clem Thomas =

British Lions & Wales international rugby union footballer

- Born: Richard Charles Clement Thomas; 28 January 1929 Cardiff, Wales
- Died: 5 September 1996 (aged 67) Swansea, Wales
- School: Blundell's School
- University: Cambridge University

Rugby union career
- Position: Flanker
Senior career
Years	Team	Apps	(Points)
- Cambridge University
–	Brynamman		
–	Swansea		
–	London Welsh		
–	Harlequins		
–	Barbarians		
International career
Years	Team	Apps	(Points)
1949–1959	Wales	26	(3)
1955	British Lions	2	(0)

Richard Clement Charles "Clem" Thomas (28 January 1929 – 5 September 1996) was a Wales international rugby union player. A flanker, he represented Cambridge University R.U.F.C. in the Varsity Match in 1949 and played for Brynamman, Swansea, London Welsh and Harlequins. He earned 26 caps for Wales, between 1949 and 1959 and captained Wales in his last nine internationals. After retiring as a player he became a rugby union journalist and author of books on the game.

== Rugby career ==
Thomas first came to note as a rugby player while still a school-boy. A boarder at Blundell's School in Tiverton he gained four Wales School-boy caps while at the school. He gained his first full senior cap in the match against France in the 1949 Five Nations Championship.

Thomas was also a member of the last Wales team that defeated the New Zealand All Blacks in 1953. In fact, it was Thomas's cross field kick that enabled Ken Jones, the flying Welsh winger, to gather the ball and touch down for the winning try.

Thomas toured South Africa with the British & Irish Lions in 1955. He was taken ill shortly after the start of the tour and was operated on for appendicitis, which caused him to miss the first ten tour matches. He spent part of his recuperation on a farm owned by the South African pilot Sailor Malan and rejoined the tour in time to be selected for the final two test matches against South Africa. Tony O'Reilly, writing after Thomas's death, felt that if Thomas had been available for all four games the Lions might have won the series rather than drawing it 2–2. Thomas captained the Lions team in the game against Natal.

== Personal history ==
Clem Thomas was born in Cardiff and educated at Blundell's School and St. John's College, Cambridge. He was married twice, to Ann Barter in 1954 and Joyce Rowley in 1980 and had three sons and one daughter with his first wife. One of his sons, Greg Thomas, was the Head of Media on the 2009 British & Irish Lions tour to South Africa. Clem Thomas was a butcher by trade but when he retired from playing rugby he took up journalism and worked for The Observer for 35 years and then The Independent on Sunday for the last two years of his life. He co-authored the book Welsh Rugby with Geoff Nicholson and wrote The History of the British and Irish Lions which he completed shortly before his death.

Thomas also owned Swansea's No Sign Bar in the 1960s: historian Peter Stead has argued that the popularity of Beaujolais Day in the city can be traced to this period: Thomas also owned a house in Burgundy and could transport the newly released Beaujolais quickly and cheaply to south Wales for sale.

Thomas also took part in politics. He stood unsuccessfully as a candidate for the Liberal Party in two general elections for the UK parliament, contesting Gower in February 1974 and Carmarthen in 1979, and in the first direct elections for the European Parliament in Mid and West Wales in 1979.

He died in Swansea in 1996 aged 67.
