= Denzil Jones =

Welsh rugby league footballer (1926–2010)

Personal information
- Full name: Denzil Jones
- Born: second ¼ 1926 Merthyr Tydfil district, Wales
- Died: 25 December 2010 (aged 84) Margam, Wales

Playing information

Rugby union
- Position: Prop
Club
Years	Team	Pld	T	G	FG	P
≤1951–≤51	Taibach RFC
≤1951–53	Aberavon RFC
	Total	0	0	0	0	0

Rugby league
- Position: Prop
Club
Years	Team	Pld	T	G	FG	P
1953	Wigan	14	1	0	0	3

Denzil Jones (birth registered second ¼ 1926 – 25 December 2010), also known by the nickname of "Buck" (after actor Buck Jones), was a Welsh rugby union, and professional rugby league footballer who played in the 1940s and 1950s. He played club level rugby union (RU) for Taibach RFC and Aberavon RFC, as a prop, and club level rugby league (RL) for Wigan, as a prop.

== Background ==
Denzil Jones' birth was registered in Merthyr Tydfil district, Wales, he worked at the Margam Knuckle Yard. and he died aged 84 in Margam, Wales.

== Playing career ==
=== Notable rugby union tour matches ===
Denzil Jones played, and was captain, in the combined Aberavon RFC/Neath RFC teams' 0–22 defeat by South Africa at Talbot Athletic Ground, Aberavon on Saturday 17 November 1951.

=== Rugby league club career ===
Denzil Jones' made his début for Wigan in the 34-3 victory over Barrow at Central Park, Wigan on Saturday 24 January 1953, and scored his first try for Wigan in the 37-5 victory over Liverpool City at Central Park, Wigan on Saturday 7 March 1953.

== Personal life ==
Denzil Jones was married to Betty Smart.
