= Richard Hibbard =

Welsh rugby union player (born 1983)

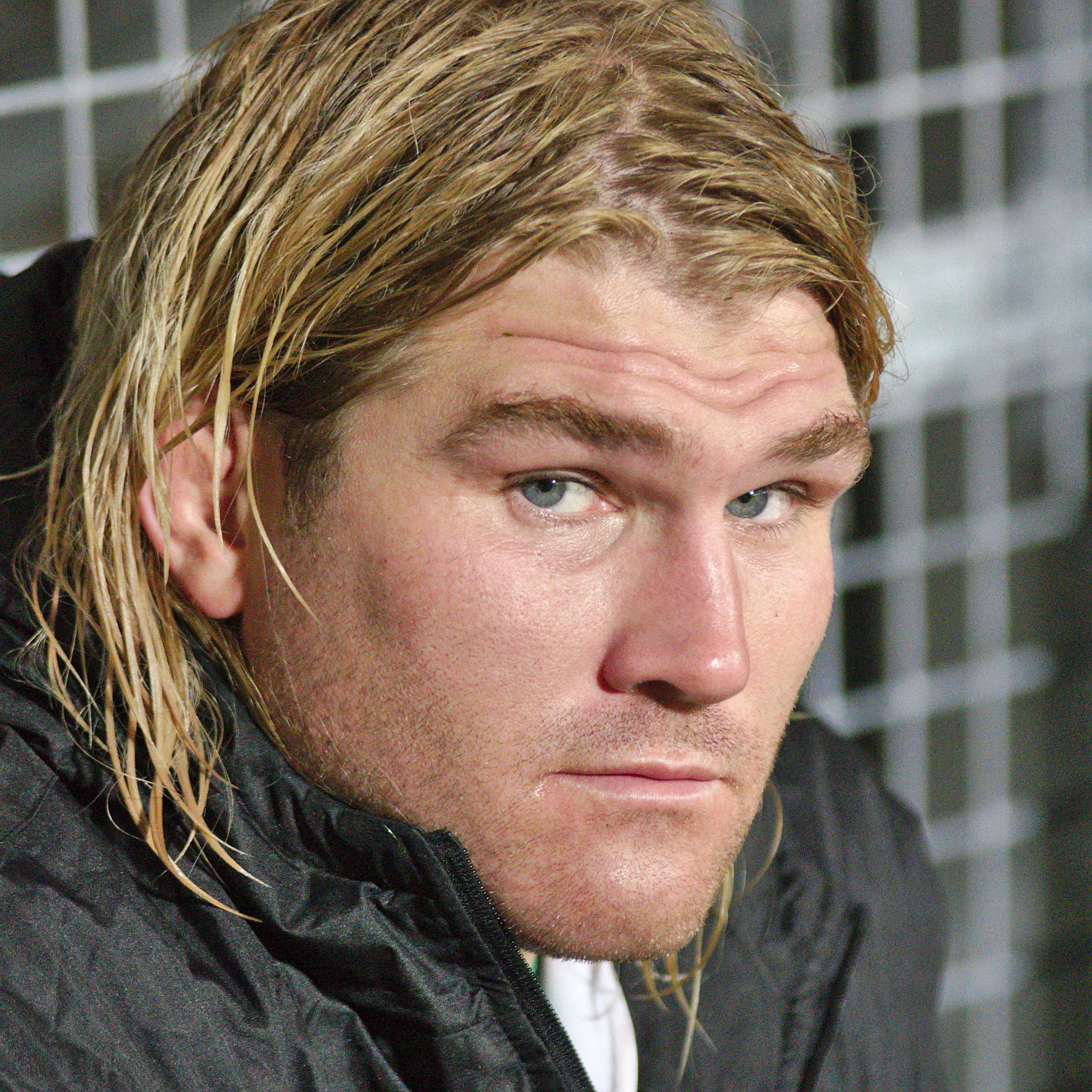
- Born: 13 December 1983 (age 42) Neath, Wales
- Height: 1.83 m (6 ft 0 in)
- Weight: 123 kg (271 lb; 19 st 5 lb)
- School: Glan Afan Comprehensive School

Rugby union career
- Position: Hooker
Amateur team(s)
Years	Team	Apps	(Points)
- Taibach RFC
- Aberavon Quins RFC
Senior career
Years	Team	Apps	(Points)
2003–2008	Swansea	88	(65)
2006–2009	Aberavon	3	(5)
2014–2018	Gloucester	100	(55)
- Correct as of 7 April 2017
Provincial / State sides
Years	Team	Apps	(Points)
2004–2014	Ospreys	175	(50)
2018–2022	Dragons	59	(3)
- Correct as of 23 March 2020
International career
Years	Team	Apps	(Points)
2006–2022	Wales	38	(10)
2013	British & Irish Lions	3	(0)
- Correct as of 8 August 2015
- Rugby league career

Playing information
Club
Years	Team	Pld	T	G	FG	P
2003	Aberavon
Representative
Years	Team	Pld	T	G	FG	P
2003	Wales A	1

Richard Hibbard (born 13 December 1983) is a retired Wales international rugby union player who last played for the Dragons.

Hibbard was born in Neath, Wales. He is married, with three children. A hooker, he started playing rugby union at age grade levels at clubs in the town of Port Talbot, including Aberavon Quins RFC and Taibach RFC. A former pupil of Glan Afan Comprehensive School, he went on to play at senior level for Taibach, Aberavon RFC and Swansea before making his name at the Ospreys.

He also played rugby league for Aberavon Fighting Irish and made one appearance for the Wales A rugby league team in their 28–18 win over England A in Aberavon in 2003.

Hibbard attained his first Wales cap against Argentina in June 2006. Hibbard missed the 2011 Rugby World Cup through injury.

He was named as part of the Lions squad for the 2013 British & Irish Lions tour to Australia and won caps in all three test matches, starting the third and decisive match.

On 16 December 2013, it was announced that Hibbard would join Gloucester Rugby in the English Aviva Premiership on a three-year contract from the 2014–15 season.

On 18 December 2017 it was confirmed Hibbard would return to Wales to sign for regional side Dragons on a three-year contract in the Pro14 from the 2018–19 season.

In recent times (2021), Richard Hibbard expanded even further than his rugby career, whereby he opened two successful restaurants including The Hideout Cafe at Aberavon Shopping Centre & The Front at Aberavon Beach, Port Talbot.

In January 2022, Hibbard announced his retirement from rugby. In April 2024 he was appointed chief executive officer of Wales Rugby League.

In 2023, he expanded his hospitality business again to include Mortal Bunny (Rum) and also opened a new restaurant Sand Rabbit Bar and Grill in 2024 on Aberavon Beach, Port Talbot.

== International tries ==
Try	Opponent	Location	Venue	Competition	Date	Result
1	Scotland	Edinburgh, Scotland	Murrayfield	2013 Six Nations	9 March 2013	Win
2	Ireland	Cardiff, Wales	Millennium Stadium	2015 Rugby World Cup warm-up matches	8 August 2015	Loss
