= Jonathan Humphreys =

Wales international rugby union player

- Born: Jonathan Matthews Humphreys; 27 February 1969 (age 57) North Cornelly, Wales
- Height: 6 ft 0 in (183 cm)
- Weight: 228 lb (103 kg)

Rugby union career
- Position: Hooker
Amateur team(s)
Years	Team	Apps	(Points)
- Kenfig Hill
Senior career
Years	Team	Apps	(Points)
1989–2002	Cardiff	240	(132)
2002–2005	Bath	58	(0)
International career
Years	Team	Apps	(Points)
1995–2003	Wales	35	(10)
Coaching career
- Years: Team
- 2006–2013: Ospreys (forwards)
- 2013–2017: Scotland (forwards)
- 2017–2018: Glasgow Warriors (assistant)
- 2018–: Wales (forwards)

Jonathan Matthews Humphreys (born 27 February 1969) is a Welsh rugby union coach and former player who is currently an assistant coach for the Wales national team. As a player, he played as a hooker for Cardiff and Bath. He earned 35 caps for Wales at international level, captaining them on 19 occasions.

== Rugby union career ==
=== Playing career ===
==== Amateur career ====
Humphreys played for Kenfig Hill RFC and Cardiff as a Hooker.

==== Professional career ====
Humphreys went on to become a leading figure and terrace favourite at Cardiff when rugby union became openly professional in 1995. In 2001–02, he had a short stint as a National Development Officer with the Sports Council for Wales. However, in 2002, he signed for Bath. He was with the club for three years.

==== International career ====
Humphreys was in the Wales squad during the 1995 Rugby World Cup and 1999 Rugby World Cup. He captained the Welsh side.

=== Coaching career ===
==== Ospreys ====
He was forwards coach at the Ospreys from 2006 to 2009.

==== Scotland ====
From June 2013 to May 2017, Humphreys has been the forwards coach for the Scotland national side.

==== Glasgow Warriors ====
In October 2016, it was announced that Humphreys would be a new assistant coach for Glasgow Warriors from May 2017.

==== Wales ====
On 19 December 2018, it was announced that Humphreys would be the new forwards coach for Wales.
