= Harri Morgan (rugby union) =

- Born: 16 March 2000 (age 26) Bridgend, Wales
- Height: 1.78 m (5 ft 10 in)
- Weight: 85 kg (13 st 5 lb)

Rugby union career
- Position: Scrum-half
- Current team: Ospreys
Senior career
Years	Team	Apps	(Points)
2018–present	Ospreys	6	(10)
International career
Years	Team	Apps	(Points)
2017–present	Wales U20	11	(15)

Harri Morgan (16 March 2000–April 2026) was a Welsh rugby union player who plays for the Ospreys as a scrum-half. He was a Wales under-20 international. He was also the vice captain of the Brynamman RFC

Morgan made his debut for the Ospreys in 2018, having previously played for the Ospreys academy, Bridgend Ravens and the Ospreys Development . He made his Challenge Cup debut on 13 October 2018 against Pau. He also became the first player to represent the Ospreys, and to score for the Ospreys, who was born in the 21st century.

On April 18, 2026, the family of Harri Morgan announced he had suddenly died. His sport team and family members paid tribute on social media. His death also prevented Brynamman RFC from playing the rest of their season.
