= Edward Pegge =

Wales international rugby union footballer

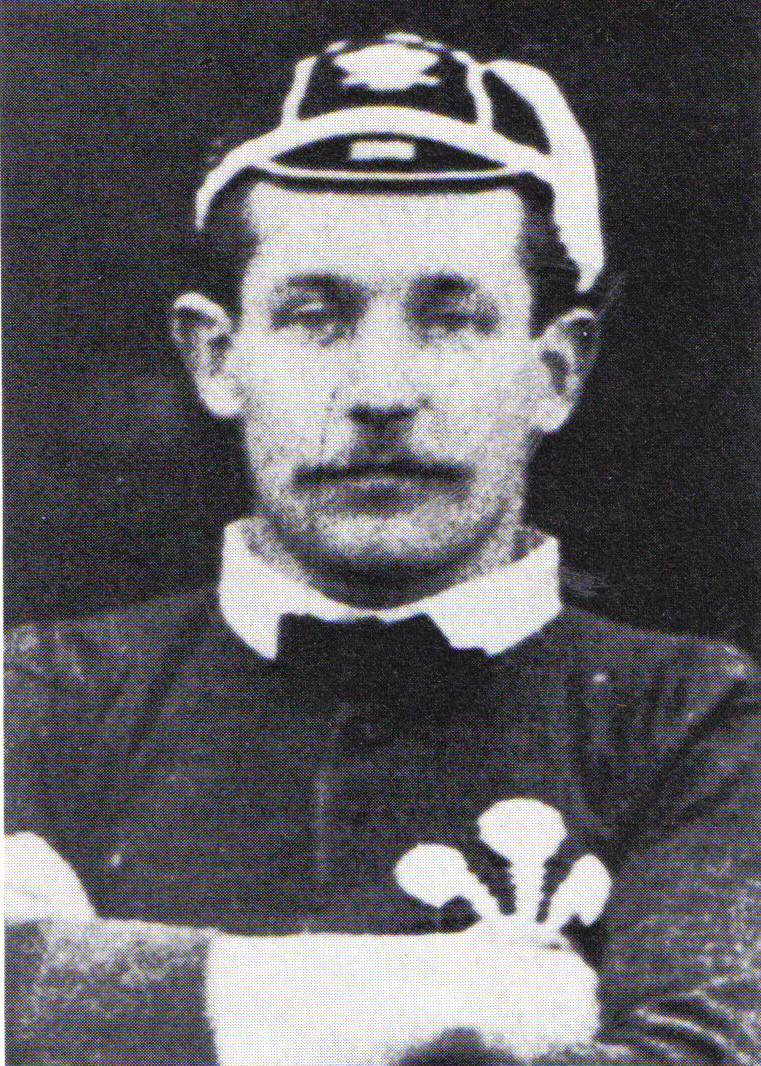
- Pegge in Welsh jersey
- Born: Edward Vernon Pegge; 5 June 1864 Briton Ferry, Neath Port Talbot, Wales
- Died: 21 March 1915 (aged 50) Briton Ferry, Wales
- University: King's College London; University of Heidelberg
- Occupation: Doctor

Rugby union career
- Position: Forward
Amateur team(s)
Years	Team	Apps	(Points)
- Briton Ferry RFC
–	Neath RFC		
–	London Welsh RFC		
International career
Years	Team	Apps	(Points)
1891	Wales	1	(0)

Edward Vernon Pegge (5 June 1864 − 21 March 1915) was a Welsh international rugby union forward who played club rugby for Neath Rugby Football Club, international rugby for Wales and later became a vice-president of the Welsh Rugby Union. Pegge had an eccentric personality that made him a stand-out character of early Welsh rugby.

== Personal life ==
Pegge was born in Briton Ferry in 1864, to Charles and Catherine Pegge. His father was originally from Wokingham in England, but moved to Wales where he ran and lived at Vernon House, the last privately owned asylum in Wales. Pegge followed his father, also becoming a doctor. One of seven children, Pegge's younger sister, Maud Cunnington was a notable archaeologist.

== Rugby career ==
Pegge played club rugby for London Welsh and Neath, and it was while representing the later that he won his one and only international cap, in the opening game of the 1891 Home Nations Championship, against England. Played at Rodney Parade in Newport, Pegge was one of three new caps brought into the pack, along with Percy Bennett and Harry Packer to face England. Wales lost the game by a goal, and Pegge was not selected for future internationals.

Apart from his single cap, several stories about Pegge allude to his individualistic nature. During the 1887 season Neath RFC embarked on their first tour of the South West of England which would later become an annual fixture. When Pegge missed the departure of his team-mates on their journey to Devon, he chartered a special train to catch up with them. He also caused a sensation when he decided to play rugby at club level with bare arms and legs, as he disapproved of the standard shin-length knickerbockers.

As well as becoming captain of the Neath first team, he was also vocal in rugby issues at club and country level. During an early meeting held by the club officials he demanded "that baths be provided forthwith and that the secretary be instructed to obtain prices for the same." Pegge's motion was carried. In 1892 Pegge was present at the meeting of the Welsh Rugby Union when Richard Mullock was removed as Secretary. During the meeting Pegge was elected as one of four vice-presidents, along with Horace Lyne, William David Phillips and Gavin Henry; Pegge representing the interests of teams from the South Western district of Wales.

=== International matches played ===
Wales

- England 1891

== Bibliography ==
- Richards, Alun (1980). A Touch of Glory: 100 Years of Welsh Rugby. London: Michael Joseph. ISBN 0-7181-1938-X.
- Smith, David; Williams, Gareth (1980). Fields of Praise: The Official History of The Welsh Rugby Union. Cardiff: University of Wales Press. ISBN 0-7083-0766-3.
