= Bryn Phillips =

Wales dual-code rugby international footballer

Brinley Phillips
Personal information
- Full name: Brinley Phillips
- Born: 11 October 1900; Merthyr Tydfil, Wales
- Died: 6 May 1980 (aged 79); Neath, Wales

Playing information

Rugby union
- Position: Lock
Club
Years	Team	Pld	T	G	FG	P
	Taibach RFC
≤1925–26	Aberavon RFC
	Glamorgan Police RFC
	Total	0	0	0	0	0
Representative
Years	Team	Pld	T	G	FG	P
1925–26	Wales	5

Rugby league
- Position: Second-row, Loose forward
Club
Years	Team	Pld	T	G	FG	P
1926–≥26	Huddersfield
Representative
Years	Team	Pld	T	G	FG	P
1927	Glamorgan	≥1
1926	Wales	1

Brinley "Bryn" Phillips (11 October 1900 – 6 May 1980) was a Welsh dual-code international rugby union and professional rugby league footballer who played in the 1920s. He played representative level rugby union (RU) for Wales, and at club level for Taibach RFC, Aberavon RFC and Glamorgan Police RFC, as a lock, and representative level rugby league (RL) for Wales and Glamorgan, and at club level for Huddersfield, as a second-row or loose forward.

== Background ==
Phillips was born in Merthyr Tydfil, Wales, and he died aged c. 79–80 in Neath, Wales.

== Playing career ==
=== International honours ===
Bryn Phillips won caps for Wales (RU) while at Aberavon RFC in 1925 against England, Scotland, France, and Ireland, and in 1926 against England, and won a cap for Wales (RL) while at Huddersfield in 1926.

=== County honours ===
Bryn Phillips played at second-row and scored a try in Glamorgan's 18–14 victory over Monmouthshire in the non-County Championship match during the 1926–27 season at Taff Vale Park, Pontypridd on Saturday 30 April 1927.
