= Glyn Gething =

- Born: Glyn Ivor Gething; 16 June 1892 Neath, Wales
- Died: 20 March 1977 (aged 84) Neath, Wales
- Occupation: bank official

Rugby union career
- Position: full back
Amateur team(s)
Years	Team	Apps	(Points)
- Skewen RFC
–	Neath RFC		
International career
Years	Team	Apps	(Points)
1913	Wales	1	(0)

Glyn Ivor Gething (16 June 1892 – 20 March 1977) was a Welsh international rugby union full back who played club rugby for Skewen and Neath and international rugby for Wales. He was a bank clerk by profession.

== Rugby history ==
Gething first came to note as a rugby player when he represented Skewen RFC. By 1913 he had joined Neath, and it was during his time at the club that he was selected for his one and only international cap for Wales. Gething was chosen for the 1913 Five Nations Championship to face France, played away at Parc des Princes, in a close game which saw Wales win 11-8.

=== International matches played ===
Wales

- France 1913

== Bibliography ==
- Jenkins, John M.; et al. (1991). Who's Who of Welsh International Rugby Players. Wrexham: Bridge Books. ISBN 1-872424-10-4.
- Smith, David; Williams, Gareth (1980). Fields of Praise: The Official History of The Welsh Rugby Union. Cardiff: University of Wales Press. ISBN 0-7083-0766-3.
