= Niall Lynch =

Niall Lynch may refer to:

- Niall Lynch (Gaelic football), manager of Mullahoran GFC
- Niall Lynch-Robinson of the Lynch-Robinson Baronets

== See also ==
- Neil Lynch (disambiguation)
