= Graham Jones (footballer, born 1949) =

Welsh footballer

Personal information
- Full name: Graham Osborne Jones
- Date of birth: 16 September 1949 (age 77)
- Place of birth: Wrexham, Wales
- Position: Defender

Youth career
- Wrexham

Senior career*
Years	Team	Apps	(Gls)
1967–1968	Wrexham	3	(0)
- Blaenau Ffestiniog Amateur
- * Club domestic league appearances and goals

Graham Osborne Jones (born 16 September 1949) is a Welsh former professional footballer who played as a defender. He made appearances in the English Football League with Wrexham in the 1960s.
