= Graham Jones (English footballer) =

English footballer

Personal information
- Date of birth: 5 October 1957 (age 69)
- Place of birth: Bradford, England
- Position: Defender

Senior career*
Years	Team	Apps	(Gls)
1974–1979	Bradford City	4	(0)
- Gainsborough Trinity
- * Club domestic league appearances and goals

Graham Jones (born 5 October 1957) is an English former professional footballer who played as a defender.

== Career ==
Born in Bradford, Jones signed for Bradford City in February 1974 after playing local amateur football, leaving the club in July 1979 to sign for Gainsborough Trinity. During his time with Bradford City he made four appearances in the Football League.

== Sources ==
- Frost, Terry (1988). Bradford City A Complete Record 1903-1988. Breedon Books Sport. ISBN 0-907969-38-0.
