= Graham Jones (Australian footballer) =

Australian rules footballer (born 1960)

Personal information
- Full name: Graham Jones
- Born: 25 October 1960 (age 66)
- Original team: Western Suburbs (NSW)
- Height: 191 cm (6 ft 3 in)
- Weight: 86 kg (190 lb)

Playing career^{1}
Years	Club	Games (Goals)
1986	Sydney	1 (0)
- ^{1} Playing statistics correct to the end of 1986.

Graham Jones (born 25 October 1960) is a former Australian rules footballer who played with Sydney in the Victorian Football League (VFL).
