= Trevor Lloyd (rugby union) =

Wales international rugby union footballer

- Born: Trevor Lloyd; 5 September 1924 Taibach, Port Talbot, Wales
- Died: 5 October 2015 (aged 91)
- School: Eastern School, Taibach

Rugby union career
- Position: Scrum-half
Amateur team(s)
| Years | Team | Apps | (Points) |
- Cwmavon RFC
| – | Aberavon Quins RFC | | |
| – | Maesteg RFC | | |
| – | Bristol Rugby | | |
| – | Glamorgan | | |
International career
| Years | Team | Apps | (Points) |
| 1953 | Wales | 2 | (0) |
| 1955 | British Lions | 0 | (0) |

Trevor Lloyd (5 September 1924 – 5 October 2015) was a Wales international rugby union player.

Lloyd hailed from Taibach a district in Port Talbot, where he started playing club rugby with the Aberavon Quins RFC, he made his debut for Wales on 14 March 1953 versus Ireland and was selected for the 1955 British Lions tour to South Africa. He also played club rugby for Maesteg RFC, captaining the team for three seasons, and coached the senior club from 1956 to 1959. Lloyd finished his playing career at home town club Aberavon Harlequins where during the 1955/56 season and directly after touring with the Lions, he captained the side into their inaugural season as a club of the Welsh Rugby Union. Lloyd died on 5 October 2015.

His daughter Lisa has been an expert on the Antiques Roadshow since 2012.
