= Banwen RFC =

(Wales) Banwen RFC
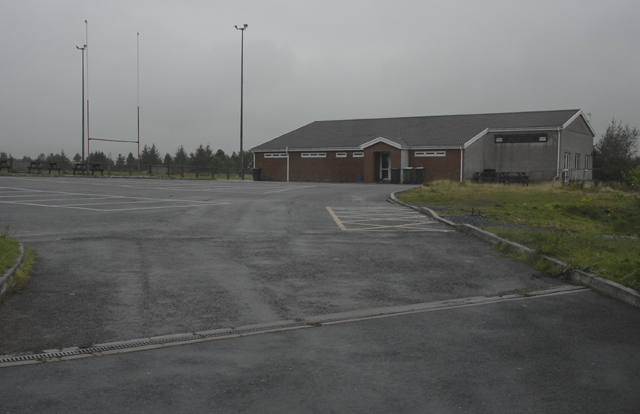
- Full name: Banwen Rugby Football Club
- Nickname: Black Dragons
- Founded: 1947
- Location: Banwen, Wales
- Ground: Banwen Park (Capacity: 200)
- President: Peter littlewood
- Coach(es): Daniel Morgan & kevin Griffiths
- League: WRU Division 5 West Central
Team kit

Official website
- banwen.rfc.wales

Banwen Rugby Football Club is a rugby union team from the village of Banwen, South Wales. Originally known as Banwen and District they formed in 1947. The club presently play in the Welsh Rugby Union Division Five South Central League and is a feeder club for the Ospreys.

During the 2007/08 season Banwen RFC failed to raise a team on more than one occasion and were relegated to division five. All matches played against opposition in Division Three South West were declared null and void.

== Club Badge ==
The original club badge is a shield split into three sections: two upper 'quarters' and a lower 'half'. In the top left quarter is a bog flower – symbolic of the flowers in the marsh between Banwen and Coelbren. The top right quarter shows a tree, and the lower half houses a white knight astride a horse.

== Club honours ==
- WRU Division Three South West 2003-04 - Champions
- Glamorgan County Silver Ball Trophy 2003-04 - Winners
