= Ystalyfera RFC =

Welsh rugby union club, based in Ystalyfera

(Wales) Ystalyfera RFC
- Full name: Ystalyfera Rugby Football Club
- Nickname: The Fera
- Founded: 1884; 142 years ago
- Location: Ystalyfera, Wales
- Ground: Ynysydarren Ground
- Chairman: Alun Coslett Davies
- Coaches: Gareth James; Andrew Jenkins; Rugby manager- Damian James
- League: championship
1st kit	2nd kit

Official website
- ystalyferarfc.mywru.co.uk

Ystalyfera Rugby Football Club are a Welsh rugby union club based in Ystalyfera in south Wales. The club is a member of the Welsh Rugby Union and is also a feeder club for the Ospreys. The club received Welsh Rugby Union status in 1904, were founder members of the West Wales League in 1929 and founder members of the National League Division 8 Central 'A' in 1994

== Club honours ==
- West Wales Champions 1930-31
- West Wales Cup Winners 1938-39
- West Wales Section ‘C’ Champions 1976-77
- Welsh National Division 5 Central Champions 1998-99
- Swansea Valley Cup Winners 1998-99, 2011–12,2014–15
- West Wales Bowl Winners 2010-11
- 2013 division 3 south west winners
- 2017 wru plate finalist runners up

2019 silver ball Finalist 2019 west wales finalist

- 2019 division 1 west central winners
- 2018 west wales cup winners

== Notable past players ==
Senior International players who have also played for Ystalyfera

- (Wales) Howell Lewis (4 caps) 1913-14
- (Wales) Albert Owen (1 cap) 1924
- (Wales) Jack Howell John (8 caps) 1926-27
- (Wales) Clive Rowlands (14 caps) 1962-65

== History ==
- 2012–13 Ystalyfera RFC season
- 2011–12 Ystalyfera RFC season
- 2010–11 Ystalyfera RFC season
- 2009–10 Ystalyfera RFC season
- 2008–09 Ystalyfera RFC season
- 2007–08 Ystalyfera RFC season
- 2006–07 Ystalyfera RFC season
- 2005–06 Ystalyfera RFC season
- 2004–05 Ystalyfera RFC season
- 2003–04 Ystalyfera RFC season
- 2002–03 Ystalyfera RFC season
- 2001–02 Ystalyfera RFC season
- 2000–01 Ystalyfera RFC season
- 1999–2000 Ystalyfera RFC season
- 1998–99 Ystalyfera RFC season
