= Graham Jones (rugby league) =

Wales international rugby league footballer

Personal information
- Full name: Graham Jones
- Born: 1932 Wales
- Died: 2023 (aged 91)

Playing information
- Position: Stand-off
Club
Years	Team	Pld	T	G	FG	P
1954–62	Salford	239	119	0	0	357
Representative
Years	Team	Pld	T	G	FG	P
1959	Wales	1	1	0	0	3

Graham Jones (1932 – 2023) was a Welsh professional rugby league footballer who played in the 1950s. He played at representative level for Wales, and at club level for Salford, as a stand-off.

== Playing career ==
Jones scored 119 tries in 239 appearances for Salford between 1954 and 1962.

Jones won a cap for Wales while at Salford in 1959.
