= Aberavon Quins RFC =

Welsh rugby union club, based in Port Talbot

Aberavon Harlequins RFC
- Nickname: The Mighty Quins
- Founded: 1891; 135 years ago
- Location: Port Talbot, Wales
- Ground: Harlequin Road (Capacity: 2,000)
- Chairman: Andrew Dacey
- President: Ken Morgan
- Coach: (Wales) Mark Jones
- Captain: (Wales) Callum Beynon
- League: WRU Division 1 West Central
- 2025-2026: 1st
Team kit

Official website
- www.aberavonquins.com

Aberavon Harlequins RFC (nicknamed "The Mighty Quins") is a Welsh rugby union team located in the Fairfield area of Port Talbot, a few minutes away from the town centre and Aberavon. In 1955, the team gained membership of the Welsh Rugby Union (WRU). Today the club is a feeder club for the Ospreys.

== History ==
The club was founded in 1891, and they become known as the Aberavon Excel, playing in an all-white strip. After the First World War in 1918, the Excels formed the Aberavon Harlequins R.F.C., which it has been known as since. They played on a waste site at what is now the Sandfields Estate, later renamed the Harlequins Field. In 1932-33, the club was reformed by Dick Lody, Dill Stanford, Don Mainwaring and H.Williams, and the club grew until the start of Second World War.

In 1951, the club received a boost when the former Maesteg RFC, Wales and British Lions scrum half Trevor Lloyd returned to Aberavon Harlequins, his original club. The 1955/56 season was the best playing record in the Quins' history, playing over thirty matches and losing only once.

At the start of the 21st century, in an attempt to modernise the governing body of Welsh rugby union and to bring Wales fully into the professional era, it was decided to restructure the Welsh leagues and to source new sponsorship revenue for them. Teams would be allocated a division depending on their recent season's order of merit and their geographical location. In the 2001/02 season, the Quins were placed in Lloyds TSB Division Two West, along with their local rivals Corus (Port Talbot) RFC.

The 2008/2009 season saw the Quins complete the “Double” winning the contested WRU Division Three South West league and also winning the Glamorgan County Silver Ball Trophy by beating Llantwit Fardre RFC 17-3, making it the second “Silver Ball” title for the Quins after previously winning it in 1982.

== Notable Former Players ==
- (Wales) Richard Hibbard
- (Wales) James Hook
- (Wales) Trevor Lloyd
- (Wales) Regan Grace
- (Wales) Jacob Flynn
- (Greece) Aris Koulizakis

== Honours ==
- 1981/82 - Glamorgan County Silver Ball Trophy
- 1987/88 - Wiztech League Champions
- 2008/09 - WRU Division Three South West
- 2008/09 - Glamorgan County Silver Ball Trophy
- 2014/15 - WRU Youth League Cup
- 2015/16 - WRU Division Two West Central
- 2025/26 - WRU Division Two West Central
- 2025/26 - WRU Division Two Cup Finalists
