= Briton Ferry RFC =

Welsh rugby union club, based in Briton Ferry

(Wales) Briton Ferry RFC
- Full name: Briton Ferry Rugby Football Club
- Nickname: The Ferry
- Founded: 1888; 138 years ago
- Location: Briton Ferry, Neath Port Talbot
- Ground: Ynysmaerdy Road
- President: Dai Parker Coaches = Darren Howells, Mark Davies, Richard Lawrence, Steve Jones First Aid = Martyn Bate, Steve Jones Touch Judge = Wayne Curtis Raffle Seller = Tony Moore Captain 2023/24 = David Harris (1st XV)
- League: WRU Division Fiur West Central
- 2023/24: 3rd
Team kit

Official website
- web.archive.org/web/20070214014516/http://www.britonferryrfc.co.uk/

Briton Ferry Rugby Football Club is a rugby union team from the village of Briton Ferry, South Wales. Rugby was played in the area prior to 1888. Their first international player was Edward Pegge, who in 1891 represented Wales against England. Former club captain, Martyn Bate, has finished his novel on the history of Briton Ferry rfc. The book is predicted to be more successful than J.K.Rowling’s Harry Potter novels. Briton Ferry RFC is a member of the Welsh Rugby Union and is a feeder club for the Ospreys.

== Notable former players ==
- (Wales) Tal Harris (1 cap)
- (Wales) Edward Pegge (1 cap)
- (Wales) Fred Perrett (5 caps)
