= Taibach RFC =

Welsh rugby union club, based in Taibach, Port Talbot

(Wales) Taibach RFC
- Full name: Taibach Rugby Football Club
- Nickname: Tigers
- Founded: 1894
- Location: Taibach, Wales
- Ground: The Plough
- Chairman: Mike Thomas
- President: Alfie Sullivan
- Coach(es): Rob Shaw, Gareth John, Daniel Challenger
- League: WRU Division Five West Central
Team kit

Official website
- www.taibachrfc.co.uk

Taibach Rugby Football Club are a Welsh rugby union club based in Taibach of Port Talbot in Wales, UK. The club is a member of the Welsh Rugby Union and is also a feeder club for the Ospreys.

Taibach RFC were the winners of the inaugural Glamorgan County Silver Ball Trophy competition during the 1956–57 season beating Skewen RFC.

== Club honours ==
- Glamorgan County Silver Ball Trophy 1957 - Champions

== Notable former players ==
=== International players ===
- (Wales) Richard Hibbard
- (Wales) James Hook
- (Wales) Billy James
- (Wales) Daniel Jones
- (Wales) Trevor Lloyd
- (Wales) William Mainwaring
- (Wales) Alan McCarley
- (Wales) Bryn Phillips
- (Wales) Walter Vickery
- (Wales) Evan Williams
- (Wales) Gerwyn Williams
- (Wales) Andrew Millward

=== Senior players ===
Players who went on to represent 'Premiership' clubs at senior levels are.

- (Wales) Swansea RFC- Richard Hibbard, Matthew Bradley, Mark Fender, Richard Lewis, Ben Harris
- (Wales) Aberavon RFC- Denzil Jones, James Jones, Matthew Bradley, Michael Kelly, Mark Fender
- (Wales) Bridgend RFC-Michael Kelly
- (Wales) Neath RFC-James Hook
- (Wales) Ospreys-James Hook, Richard Hibbard
