= Nantyffyllon RFC =

Welsh rugby union football club

(Wales) Nantyffyllon RFC
- Full name: Nantyffyllon Rugby Football Club
- Nickname(s): Nanty
- Location: Nantyffyllon, Wales
- Ground(s): Blosse Street
- League(s): WRU Division 1 West Central
- 2020-21: 8th
Team kit

Official website
- nantyffyllonrfc.co.uk

Nantyffyllon Rugby Football Club is a rugby union team from the village of Nantyffyllon in Maesteg, Wales. The club is a member of the Welsh Rugby Union and is a feeder club for the Ospreys. The club fields a senior team which plays in the WRU National leagues, and also fields a second XV, youth and junior teams.

== Club history ==
The clubs origins date back to the 1899/1900 season, playing under the name “All Whites”. The team subsequently changed their name in 1908 to “Nanty Stars”, and again to “Nantyffyllon Juniors RFC” in 1932.

In 1963, a new field and clubhouse was opened in Blosse Street, named for Mr Lynch Blosse, from who the land for the original field was acquired.

In 2007, an original feasibility study was conducted to assess the need for a new facility. The project was shelved for a number of years, but in the autumn of 2013, ground was broken on a new clubhouse and field redesign. The site was officially opened in a ceremony on Saturday 6 October. The official opening was MC’d by Club Patron JJ Williams and officially opened by Dennis Gethin.

The new facility contains a function room, restaurant and an indoor training facility and gym.

=== On-field history ===
In May 2019, the club were crowned Glamorgan County Silverball Champions for the first time in its history, defeating Ystalyfera RFC 18–12 at the Brewery Field in Bridgend

In June 2016, the clubs youth team were crowned WRU Youth National Champions, defeating Caerphilly RFC Youth 28 - 24.

== Past notable players ==
- J. J. Williams (rugby union)
- Mark Davies (rugby union)
- Chris Stephens (rugby union)
