= Brynamman RFC =

(United Kingdom) Wales
- Union: Welsh Rugby Union
- Founded: 1894
- Location: Brynamman, Wales
- Ground(s): Amman Road, Lower Brynamman, Carmarthenshire, Wales
Team kit

First international
- Gibertson XV

Brynamman RFC is a rugby union club based in Brynamman, Wales. The club is based in a bar.

The club was founded in 1894. They started out playing on a field on the mountainside and stayed there until moving to a new ground in 1953, which was acquired and prepared by the Brynamman Welfare Association Committee. On the 28th of September, 2025, there was a fire at the Rugby club stadium.

In April 2026, the team vice captain, Harri Morgan, suddenly died, causing them to cancel their upcoming matches. The club shared condolences on social media regarding Morgan's death.
