= Bryncoch RFC =

Welsh rugby union club, based in Bryncoch

(Wales) Bryncoch RFC
- Full name: Bryncoch Rugby Football Club
- Founded: c 1898; 128 years ago
- Location: Bryncoch
- Ground: Memorial Recreation Ground
- Chairman: Adrian Lewis
- President: Brian Sheppard
- Coach(es): Christian Loader; Craig Thomas; Tristan Davies
- League: WRU Division Three South West
- 2025/2026: 7th
Team kit

Official website
- www.bryncochrfc.com

Bryncoch Rugby Football Club are a Welsh rugby union club based in the town of Bryncoch in Neath, Wales. The club is a member of the Welsh Rugby Union and is also a feeder club for the Ospreys. The club fields First, Second and Youth teams.

== Club honours ==
- 1951/52 League Champions Neath & District.
- 1954/55 League Champions Neath & District.
- 1958/59 League Champions Neath & District.
- 1960/61 League Champions Neath & District.
- 1970/71 League Champions Neath & District.
- 1978 WRU Cup.
- 2008/09 WRU Division Four South West - Champions.
