= Kenfig Hill RFC =

Welsh rugby union club, based in Kenfig Hill

(Wales) Kenfig Hill RFC
- Full name: Kenfig Hill Rugby Football Club
- Nickname: The Mules
- Founded: 1897; 129 years ago
- Location: Kenfig Hill, Bridgend
- Ground: Croft Goch Playing Fields
- Chairman: Howard Phillips
- Coach(es): Steffan Jones and Rhys Jones
- Captain: Tom Briggs
- League: WRU National Championship West
- 2023–2024: WRU Division One West Central, 3rd (promoted)
Team kit

Official website
- kenfighill.rfc.wales

Kenfig Hill Rugby Football Club is a rugby union team from the village of Kenfig Hill, South Wales. Kenfig Hill RFC presently play in the Welsh Rugby Union Division one west. The club is a member of the Welsh Rugby Union and is a feeder club for the Ospreys. The club fields a First, Seconds, Youth and Junior teams.

A club was first founded at Kenfig in 1897, though not taking the name Kenfig Hill RFC at the time. In 1914 the club, like many teams in the area, went into liquidation, but reformed after the First World War, playing from Croft Goch Playing Fields.

Kenfig Hill RFC has seen several players progress to represent Wales and the British Lions, including Welsh captain, Jack Bassett.

== Club honours ==
- 1973-74 Glamorgan County Silver Ball Trophy, winners.

== Notable former players ==
- (Wales) Arthur A. Bassett
- (Wales) Jack Bassett
- (Wales) Cliff Davies
- (Wales) Tim Fauvel
- (Wales) Eiryn Gwyn Davies
- (Wales) Raymond Giles
- (Wales) Jonathan Humphreys
- (Wales) Dafydd James
- (Wales) David Morgan Jenkins dual-code international
- (Wales) Ned Jenkins (21 caps)
- (Wales) Phillip John O.B.E
- (Wales) Alan John Phillips
- (Wales) Brian Radford
- (Wales) Aaron Rees
- (Wales) Craig Warlow
- (Wales) Matthew Wintle
- (Wales) Richard Wintle
