= Skewen RFC =

Welsh rugby union club, based in Skewen

(Wales) Skewen RFC
- Full name: Skewen Rugby Football Club
- Founded: 1883; 143 years ago
- Location: Skewen, Wales
- Ground: Tennant Park
- President: Rylan Lopez
- Coach: Christopher Grimes
- Captain: Zac Pearce
- League: WRU Division One West
- 2009–10: 1st WRU Division Three South West
Team kit

Official website
- www.skewen-rfc.co.uk

Skewen Rugby Football Club is a rugby union team from the village of Skewen, South Wales. Skewen RFC is a member of the Welsh Rugby Union and is a feeder club for the Ospreys.

== Club history ==
There is evidence of a Skewen rugby team playing as early as 1879 with a match reported in "The Western Mail" against Neath being played on 4 January 1879, losing by 2 tries and 4 touch downs to nil, at the Court Herbert Field.

During the 1897/88 season they applied for and were successful in gaining membership to the Welsh Rugby Union, though funding remained an issue and it is recorded that during the 1902/03 season the club still claimed no money from the WRU. In 1904 the club secured a regular playing ground at Cae Lynch, from here they could charge a few pence for admission. In 1905 they switched grounds to Cae Wathen, the same year the club held their first official dinner, an important event for any rugby club.

Unlike most Welsh clubs, rugby was still played in Skewen during the First World War, but mainly as charity matches between local collieries. In 1920 the club was playing competitive rugby and managed to beat Bridgend RFC a team that played at a far higher level than Skewen. In 1936 Skewen RFC moved to their present pitch at Tennant Park. During the second World War all rugby ceased under the orders of the WRU.

Skewen RFC were the losing finalists of the inaugural Glamorgan County Silver Ball Trophy competition during the 1956–57 season.

Welsh international props Paul James, Rhodri Wells and Craig Mitchell came through Skewens junior teams, as did centre Ashley Beck.

== Club honours ==
- WRU Division Three South West 2009/10 - Champions

== Notable past players ==
- Glyn Gething - Wales
