= Mossy saxifrage =

Mossy saxifrage may refer to:

- Saxifraga bryoides
- Saxifraga × arendsii
- Saxifraga hypnoides
