= Ogof Ffynnon Ddu =

Cave in South Wales

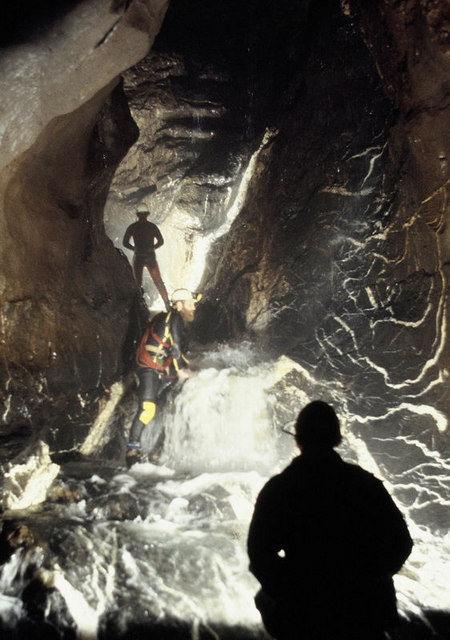
- The main streamway of OFD 2.
- Interactive map of Ogof Ffynnon Ddu
- Location: Upper Swansea Valley
- Coordinates: 51.8243°N 3.6611°W
- Depth: 274.5 metres (901 ft)
- Length: 59 kilometres (37 mi)
- Discovery: South Wales Caving Club 1946
- Geology: Limestone
- Entrances: 3
- Access: South Wales Caving Club—see website for details
- Translation: Cave of the black spring (Welsh)
- Cave survey: South Wales Caving Club 2014
- Registry: Cambrian Cave Register

Ogof Ffynnon Ddu (Welsh for cave of the black spring), also known informally as OFD, is a cave under a hillside in the area surrounding Penwyllt in the Upper Swansea Valley in South Wales. It is the second longest cave in Wales and the deepest in the United Kingdom.

== History ==
OFD was discovered in 1946 through digging by Peter Harvey and Ian Nixon, members of the newly formed South Wales Caving Club. Exploration beyond the Boulder Chamber in 1957 revealed passages as far as the Dip Sump. Major extensions were discovered in 1967 through to Cwm Dŵr, which is now known as OFD2. The system is famous for its intricate maze-like structure and its impressive main stream passage.

It is now part of the Ogof Ffynnon Ddu National Nature Reserve, which includes the ruined remains of a former brickworks, including several kilns, quarry workings and tramroad tracks. The terrace of workers' cottages is now occupied by the South Wales Caving Club.

The cave has seen many minor incidents resulting from people getting lost or tired, or surprised by flooding, and various accidents such as falls which are handled by volunteer cave rescue teams who are alerted by the police. More prolonged rescues have included:

In 1951, before cave rescue was well established, "two well-known members of the South Wales Caving Club, Lewis Railton and W.H.Little, made their way into the huge cave that bears the Welsh name of Ogof-Y Ffynnon Ddu (Cave of the Black Well or Stream) in South Wales...[when] swirling water cut off their escape...a rescue party including soldiers from Senny Bridge, men of the R.A.F., and thirty miners set to work to divert the stream above the point where it goes underground...they were brought out into the open air after being trapped for fifty-nine hours..."

In 2021 the cave was the site of the longest cave rescue undertaken in Wales, after George Linnane, a 38-year-old experienced caver, fell 8 m (26 ft) and sustained multiple injuries. Almost 250 people were involved in the rescue, which was organised by the South and Mid Wales Cave Rescue Team and involved manually hauling the casualty by stretcher, using relay teams of rescuers, to the top entrance. Linnane was rescued on the evening of 8 November, after 57 hours; the previous longest rescue was 41 hours.

== The cave system ==
With a depth of 274 m (900 ft) and a length of at least 50 kilometres (31 mi), it is the deepest cave in the UK and the second-longest in Wales. The passages and chambers of Ogof Ffynnon Ddu weave a tortuous path beneath the east side of the Tawe Valley. The stream passage cuts through black limestone producing waterfalls, rapids, deep potholes and scalloped walls. The system is divided into three parts: the lowermost (western) section is referred to as Ogof Ffynnon Ddu I (or simply OFD I), the central section as Ogof Ffynnon Ddu II (or OFD II) and the uppermost (eastern) section as Ogof Ffynnon Ddu III (or OFD III).

A variety of specialised wildlife has developed underground including cave shrimps and the pale blanched trout endemic to pure underground fresh water courses with sufficient plankton. Deep cracks in the vast expanse of stony moorland above provide habitats for plant life, including the lily of the valley and wood anemone, and mossy saxifrage (Saxifraga hypnoides) grows on the limestone outcrops.

== National Nature Reserve (NNR) ==
The name Ogof Ffynnon Ddu has also been applied to an extensive tract of moorland, rocks and cave systems of which the eponymous cave is a part. It was designated as an NNR because of its unique geology, floristic diversity, its industrial past and its subterranean animal and plant life.

== See also ==
- Pwll Dwfn
- Dan yr Ogof
