= Carreg Cadno =

Hill (538m) in Powys, Wales

Coordinates: 51.8300°N 3.6335°W

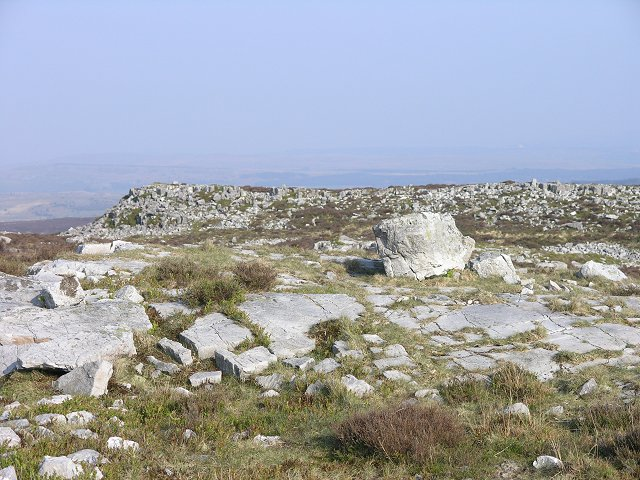
Carreg Cadno, a rocky outcrop on the moorland east of Penwyllt

Carreg Cadno (Welsh for 'rock of the fox'') is a hill five miles northeast of Abercraf in the county of Powys, south Wales. It lies within the Brecon Beacons National Park and Fforest Fawr Geopark. Its summit at OS grid ref SN 874161 reaches a height of 538m / 1763 ft above sea level. The hill is within the Ogof Ffynnon Ddu National Nature Reserve which is owned and managed by the Countryside Council for Wales.

== Geology ==
The southern slopes of the hill are formed from the Twrch Sandstone, a coarse quartzitic sandstone (gritstone), formerly known as the Basal Grit of the Millstone Grit Series, and laid down during the Namurian stage of the Carboniferous period. The northern slopes are formed from the underlying Carboniferous Limestone. The area displays various features typical of karstic landscapes including hundreds of shakeholes in both the limestone and the gritstone areas. Substantial areas of gritstone country have foundered as the underlying limestone has dissolved away and caverns have collapsed. There are also areas of both limestone pavement and gritstone pavement. The latter occasionally retain striations on their polished upper surfaces due to scratching by stones embedded in the base of a moving icesheet during the last ice age some 18,000 years ago.

There are also pockets of silica sand where the gritstone has been intensively weathered. An economically valuable deposit of silica sand was worked near Pwll Byfre for many years and transported by tramroad to make refractory bricks ('firebricks' or 'silica bricks') at the nearby Penwyllt Dinas Silica Brick Works.

Ogof Ffynnon Ddu, Britain's deepest cave lies under the northern slopes of Carreg Cadno. The vertical interval between the sink of the Byfre Fechan stream at Pwll Byfre and its resurgence at Ffynnon Ddu is 300m / 1000 ft. The national nature reserve has been established to protect both the surface features and the vegetation and habitats which they provide and also the extensive cave network beneath.

== Access ==
The hill is designated as open country and so freely available to walkers. A public footpath followed by the Beacons Way crosses the northern flanks of the hill in an east-west arc from Ystradfellte to Penwyllt. Many walkers start in a car park beside the limestone quarry at Penwyllt (OS grid ref SN855156).
