= Colbren Junction railway station =

Former railway station in Wales

Colbren Junction
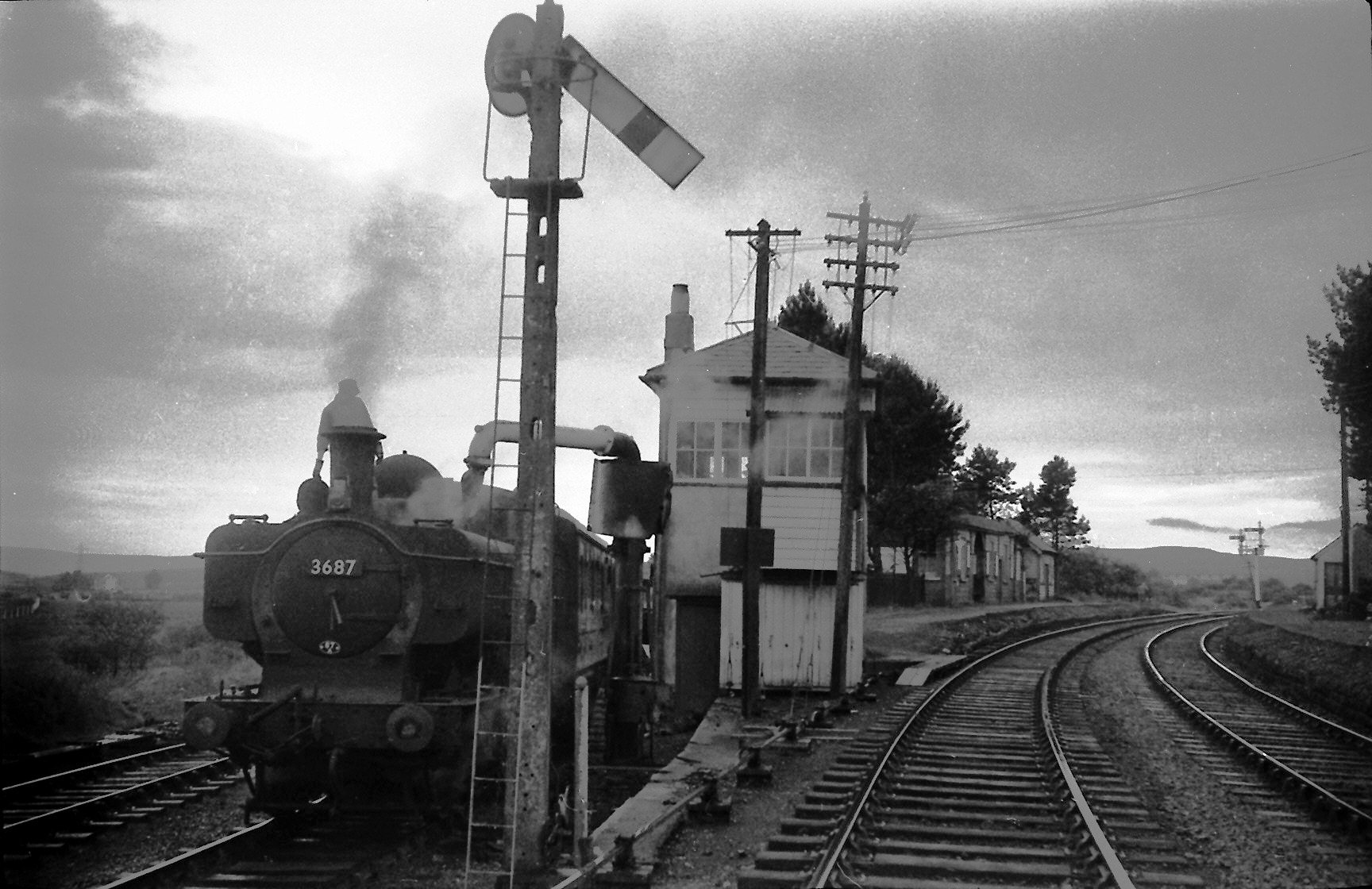
- A Brecon-bound train at Colbren Junction. October 1962.

General information
- Location: Coelbren, Powys; Wales
- Coordinates: 51.7890°N 3.6678°W
- Grid reference: SN849114
- Platforms: 2 side platforms (upper); 1 side platform (lower)

Other information
- Status: Disused

History
- Original company: Neath and Brecon Railway
- Pre-grouping: Neath and Brecon Railway
- Post-grouping: GWR; Western Region of British Railways

Key dates
- 10 November 1873: Opened
- 15 October 1962: Closed
Location

Colbren Junction was a railway station on the Neath and Brecon Railway. The station, which was near Coelbren, was completed at the same time as the Swansea Vale and Neath and Brecon Joint Railway opened a seven-mile branch from here to Ynysygeinon in 1873. It was a key junction in the networks operated by the Midland, Neath and Brecon, and Great Western railway companies.

Although the Welsh spelling of the nearby village is 'Coelbren', the anglicised version 'Colbren' was used for the station name and in railway literature.

== History ==
=== Background ===
Colbren Junction was the outcome of a plan by the Midland Railway to reach the port of Swansea and it surrounding industries. The Midland wanted a route to Swansea that was independent of its two main competitors, the Great Western and London and North Western Railway.

By 1867, the Neath and Brecon Railway had already opened a branch south from Brecon down the east side of the Tawe (or Swansea valley). This line, which provided the shortest route to Neath, crossed into the head of the parallel Dulais Valley near Coelbren. It then carried on westwards along the coast to Swansea via the Swansea and Neath Railway. Despite its direct route to the coast, the line avoided most of the Swansea Valley. Bypassing the areas around Abercrave near Ystradgynlais where there was heavy industry including coal mining and iron-making.

It was for these commercial reasons that the branch from Colbren to Ynysygeinon was conceived. Ynysygeinon lay in the floor of the Swansea Valley, in which the Swansea Vale Railway had been operating (initially as a tramway) since 1816. The branch, which opened in 1873, was promoted as the "Swansea Vale and Neath and Brecon Junction Railway" even though Swansea Vale had merged with the Neath and Brecon in 1869. Colloquially it was known as the "Junction line".

=== Operations ===
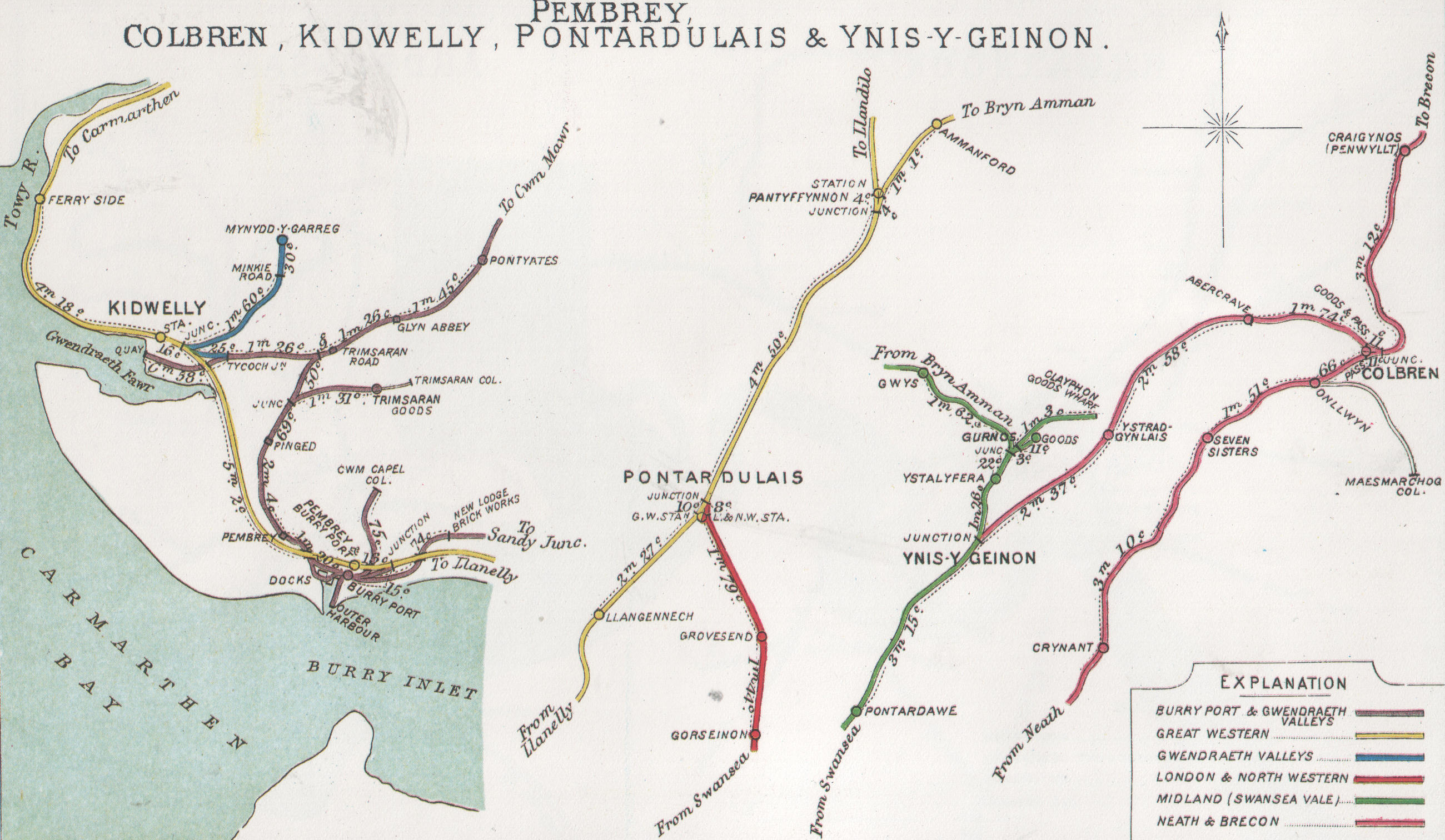
Colbren Junction on a pre-grouping railway map c.1914.

Colbren Junction station, which opened in 1873 at the same time as the new route, was situated at the point where the original Neath and Brecon line met the new branch to Ynys-y-Geinon. The station consisted of three separate side platforms. As the Neath line was on a falling gradient, while the branch rose before commencing the descent to the Tawe valley, the branch's two platforms were built at a higher level to the single Neath side platform. Access between the upper and lower central platforms was by a short flight of steps.

Although the Midland Railway had constructed a line into South Wales, it still needed to negotiate operating powers with several rival companies to make the route viable. These included the London and North Western Railway which reached Swansea via its Central Wales route in 1868. The Midland first leased, in 1874, and then acquired the Swansea Vale Railway in 1876; while exchanging running powers with the Neath and Brecon. A similar procedure was then employed with the Hereford, Hay and Brecon Railway; its running powers were passed to the Great Western. In doing so, the Midland was able to link with its main national network at Worcester.

The outcome of these complex arrangements allowed the Midland to become the sole operator of the Brecon-Colbren-Ynys-y-Geinon-Swansea route, thus reducing the original main line between Colbren and Neath to the status of a branch. Until 1916 the Midland ran its trains beyond Brecon to Hereford, with parts of trains running directly to and from Worcester and Birmingham. Eventually these services were cut back to Brecon.

=== Demise ===
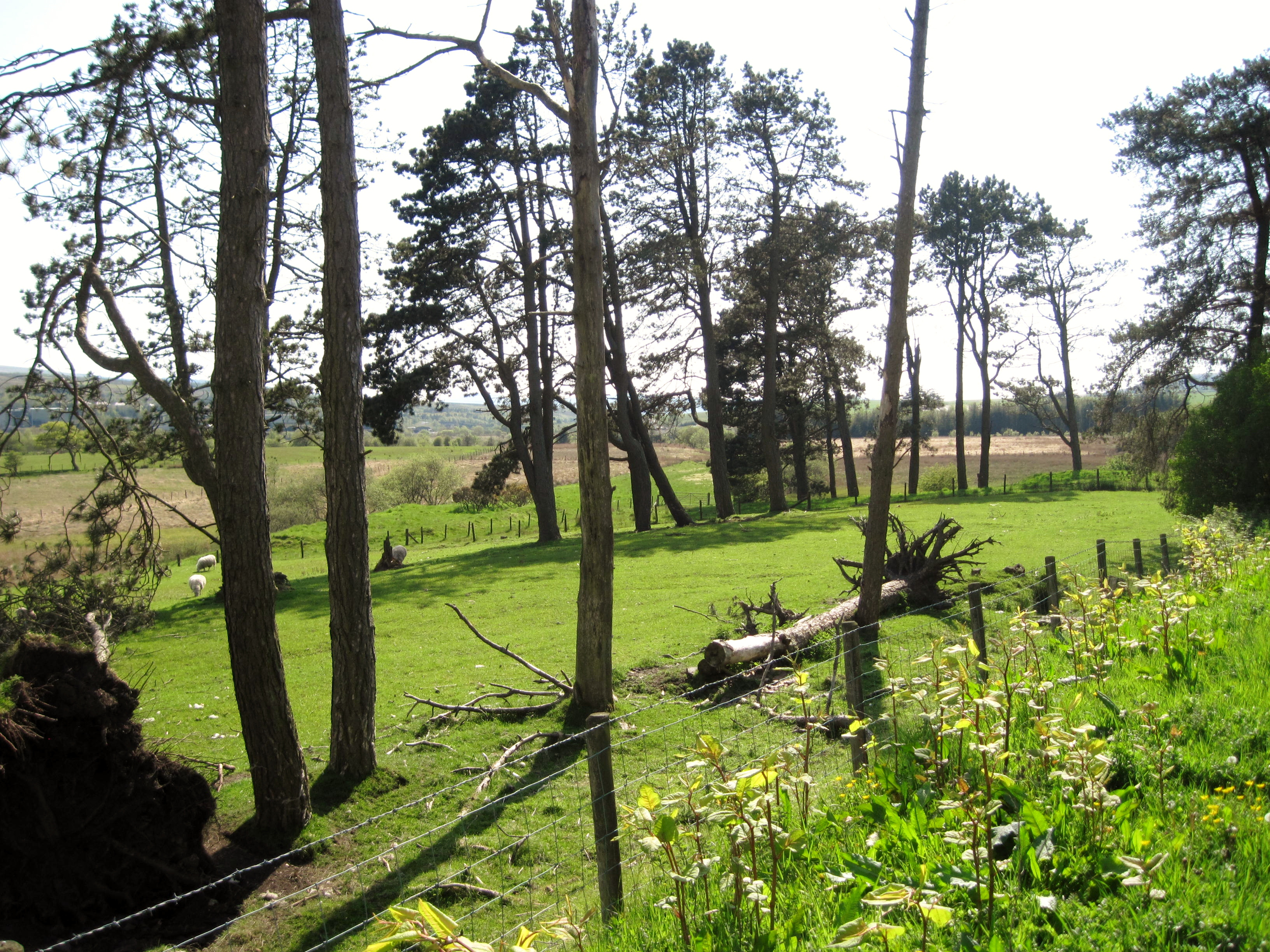
Location of the upper Swansea branch platforms at Colbren Junction, c.2012.

Passenger traffic through Colbren would begin its decline following implementation of the railway groupings in 1923. The Midland and the London and North Western Railways (L&NWR) each became part of the new London Midland and Scottish Railway (LMS), while the Neath and Brecon (including the Ynys-y-Geinon branch) passed to the Great Western. These changes meant the original purpose of the Midland's route into South Wales was now annulled because the new LMS company could now send all its South Wales traffic via the former L&NWR Central Wales line.

LMS passenger trains between Brecon and Swansea continued to stop at Colbren Junction until 1930. This service was then replaced by Brecon to Neath trains operated by the GWR. A short-lived passenger service continued to use the branch to Ynys-y-Geinon for a further two years; until finally ceasing in 1932. Subsequently, both platforms on the Swansea branch fell into disuse except for occasional excursion trains.

The passenger service between Brecon and Neath was reduced to one train per day in each direction before finally withdrawn in October 1962. In 1964, the direct lines linking Neath and Swansea with Brecon via Colbren were deemed to be no longer viable. The Swansea branch to Ynys-y-Geinon ceased carrying local freight in 1967 wherein Colbren stopped being a junction with the removal of the branch. Freight traffic continued to pass through Colbren from Penwyllt quarries to Neath until 1977. Following the removal of the track through Colbren, the Neath and Brecon line now terminates at the coal washer at Onllwyn.

Little remains at Colbren of the station or the junction, although surviving conifers indicate the alignment of the track of the former railway.

== Legacy ==
Plans have been proposed to extend National Cycle Route 43 northwards along the old trackbed from Colbren towards Brecon as far as the summit of the old line. However a major landslip on one of the high embankments north of Penwyllt has held up the scheme.

== Services ==
Preceding station	Disused railways	Following station
Onllwyn	Neath and Brecon Railway; GWR	Craig-y-nos (Penwyllt)
Abercrave	Swansea Vale and Neath and Brecon Junction Railway; GWR	Craig-y-nos (Penwyllt)
