= Dan yr Ogof =

Cave system in Wales, United Kingdom

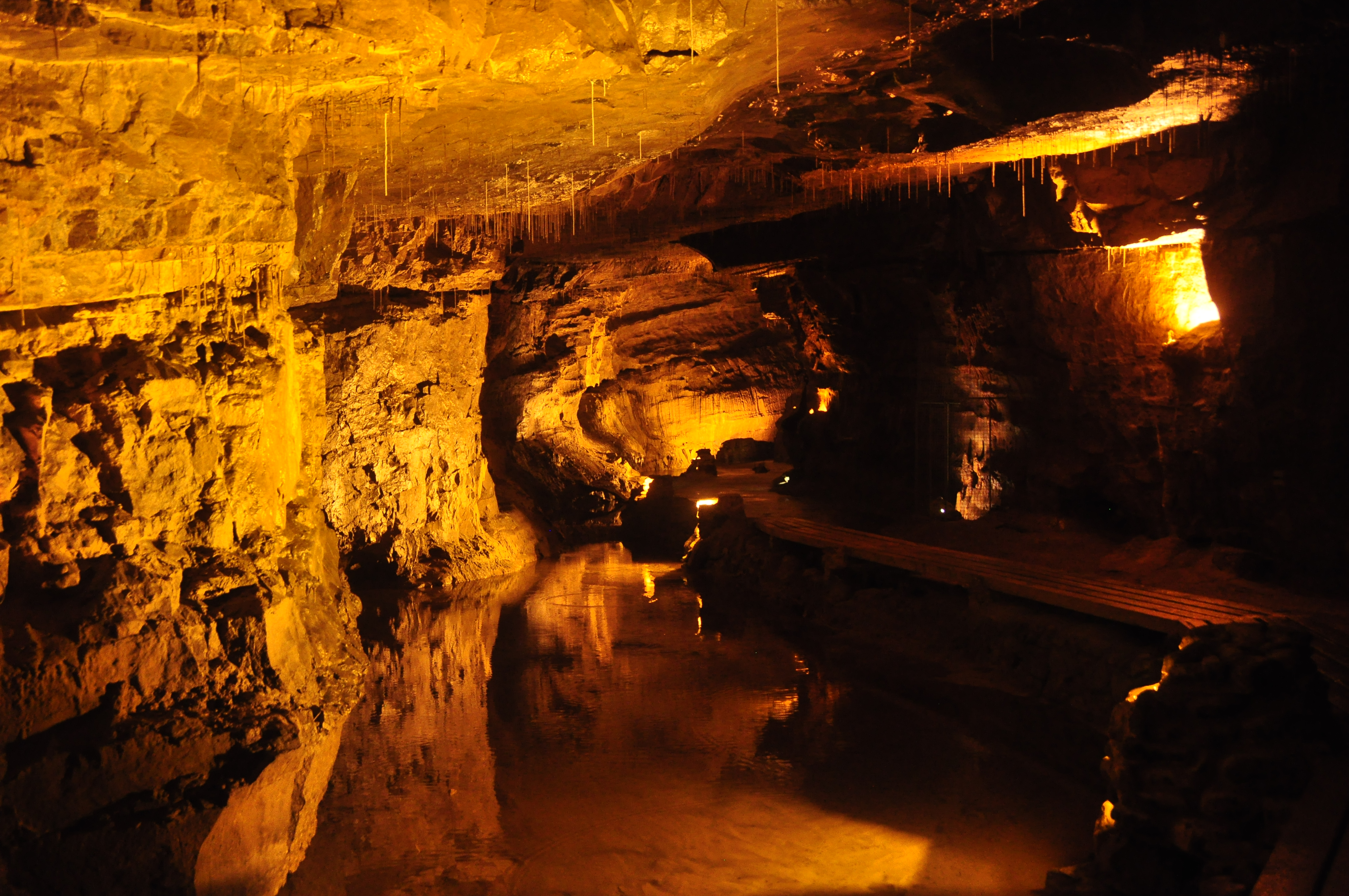
- A cave passage with speleothems at Dan yr Ogof.
- Interactive map of Dan yr Ogof
- Location: Powys, Wales
- OS grid: SN 83825 16021
- Coordinates: 51°49′50″N 3°41′14″W
- Length: 15,500 metres (50,900 ft)
- Discovery: 1912
- Hazards: Some parts avoided when on tour of caves
- Access: Dan yr Ogof Conservation Advisory Panel
- Translation: "Beneath the cave". The Morgan Brothers named the cave after their farm. (Welsh)
- Registry: Cambrian Cave Registry

Dan yr Ogof (Welsh pronunciation: [ˈdan ər ˈoːɡɔv]), at the National Showcaves Centre for Wales, is a 17-kilometre (11 mi) long cave system in south Wales, about 5 miles (8 km) north of Ystradgynlais and 15 miles (24 km) southwest of Brecon, in the Brecon Beacons National Park. It is the main feature of a show cave complex, which is claimed to be the largest in the United Kingdom and is a tourist attraction in Wales. The first section of the cave system is open to the public, but the extensive cave system beyond is scheduled as a national nature reserve and is open only to bona fide cavers.

The bones of some 42 humans, as well as numerous animal bones, have been found in one of the nearby chambers of this cave system. In a 2005 poll of Radio Times readers, Dan yr Ogof was named as Britain's greatest natural wonder.

== Exploration ==
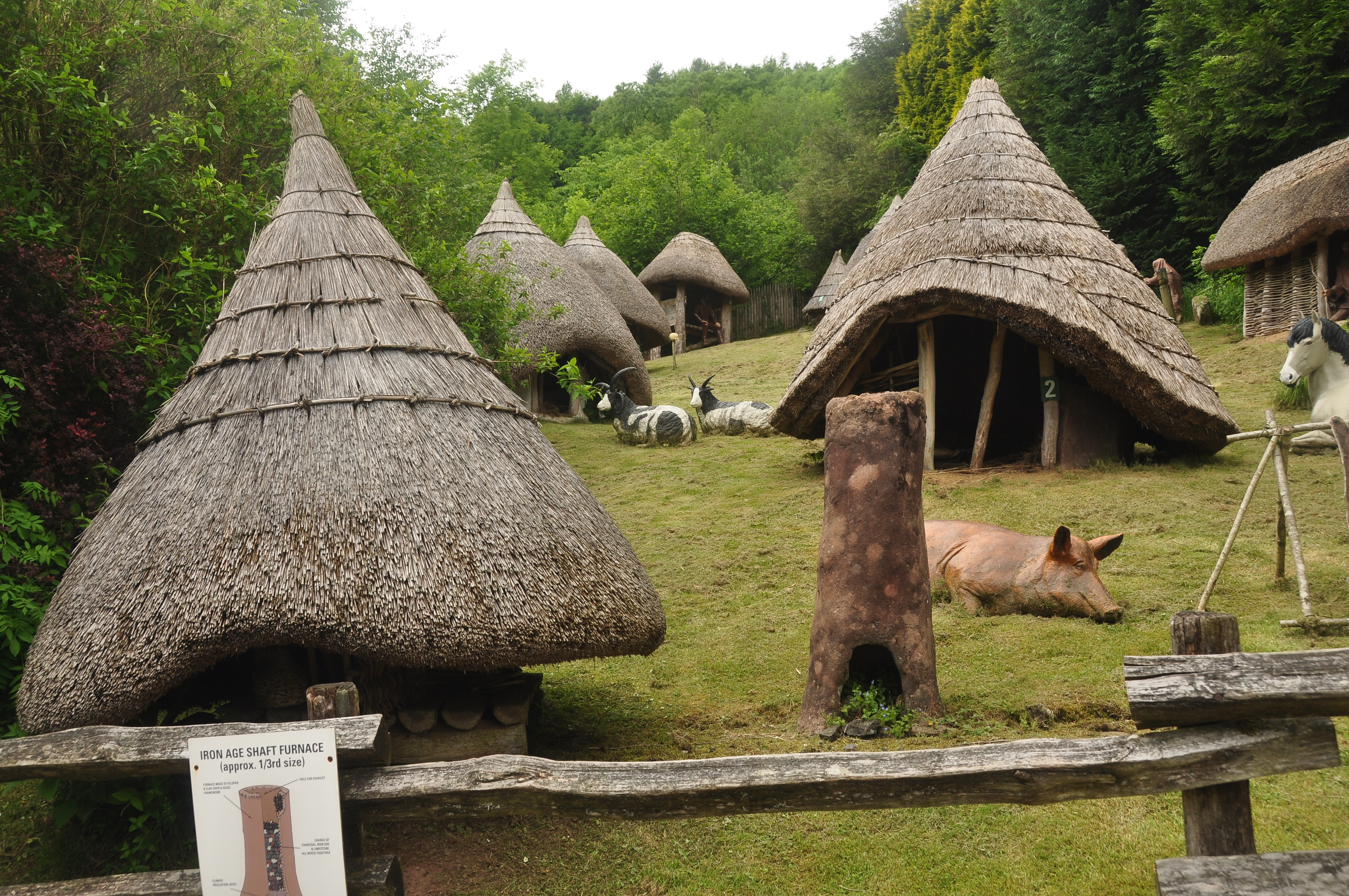
Reconstructed Roundhouses at Dan yr Ogof

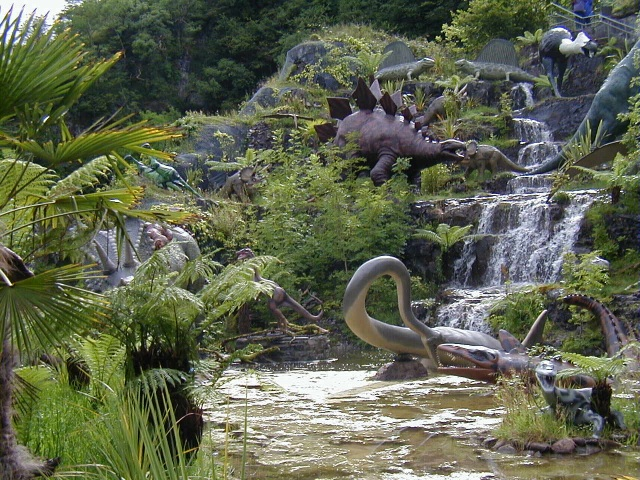
Dinosaur exhibition at Dan yr Ogof

The cave was first explored in 1912 by two local brothers, Edwin and Jeff Morgan, using candles and primitive equipment. Completely unsure of what they would discover, they armed themselves with a revolver. Edwin was the first to enter, as he was the smallest of the Morgan brothers. Initial expedition was halted at a large lake, which they later managed to cross by coracle. They eventually crossed three more lakes in the same manner, but were stopped by a tight crawl.

This squeeze, known as the Long Crawl, was first passed by Eileen Davies, a member of the South Wales Caving Club in 1963. The initials 'PO' were found by Eileen Davies at the pitch to Gerard Platten Hall. Peter Ogden had not descended the pitch due to lack of the required equipment and was prevented from returning by an extended period of bad weather. Exploration has been steadily continued by later cavers who have extended the cave to its present 17-kilometre (11 mi) length. Some of this length was reached by cave diving. One of these explorers was Martyn Farr, who wrote a book about the system in which he claims that the system will eventually be extended to at least 150 km (93.2 mi).

== Filming location ==
The cave was used as a filming location for the Doctor Who serial The Pirate Planet.

== See also ==
- Pwll Dwfn
- Ogof Ffynnon Ddu
