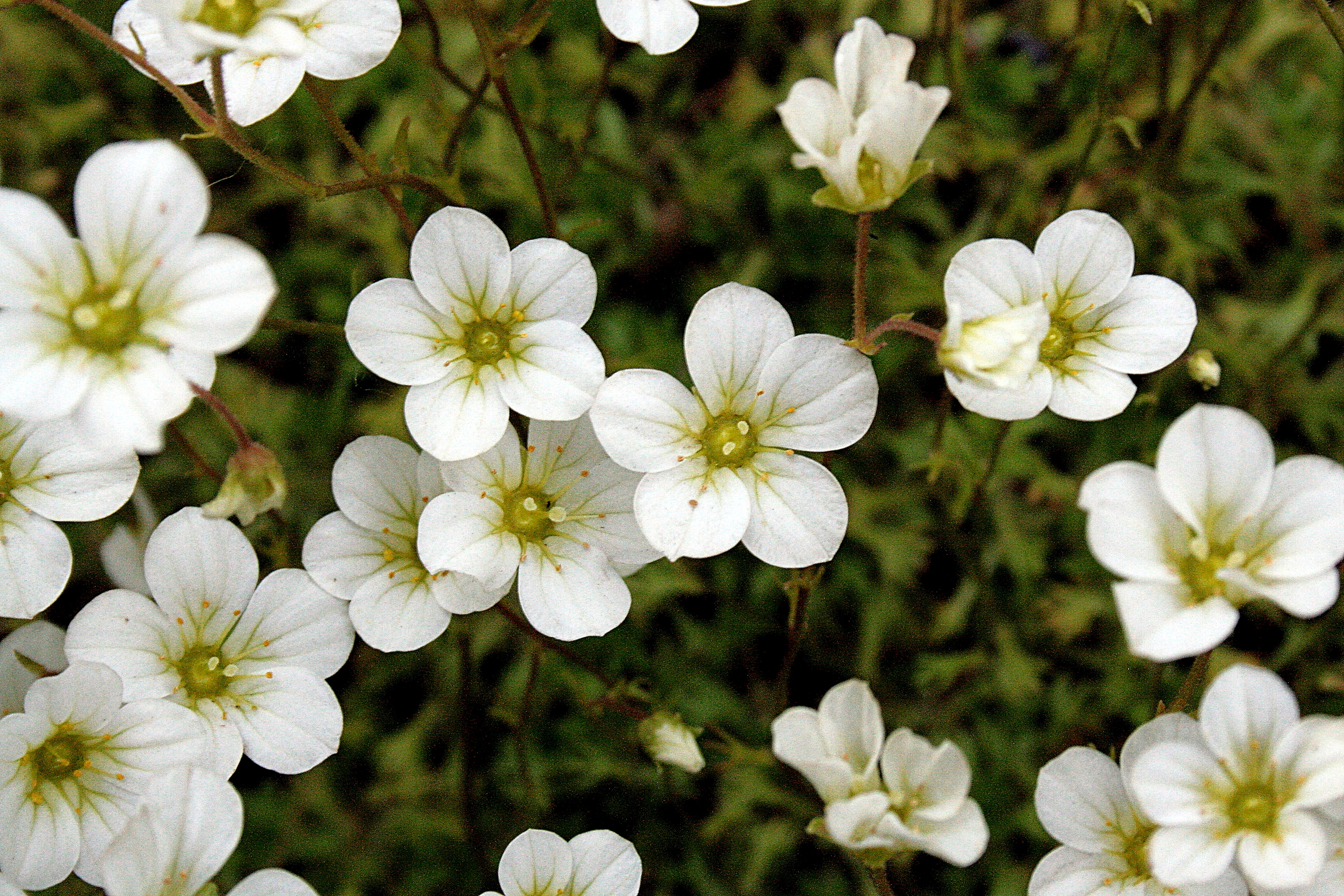
- Saxifraga rosacea photographed at a botanical garden in Iceland in 2010

Scientific classification
- Kingdom: Plantae
- Clade: Tracheophytes
- Clade: Angiosperms
- Clade: Eudicots
- Order: Saxifragales
- Family: Saxifragaceae
- Genus: Saxifraga
- Species: S. rosacea

Binomial name
- Saxifraga rosacea Moench

= Saxifraga rosacea =

Species of flowering plant

Saxifraga rosacea, Irish saxifrage, or rosy saxifrage, is a herbaceous plant in the family Saxifragaceae. The epithet rosacea does not refer to its flowers which are white, but to its radical sterile shoots which are often rosy. Owing to this misleading epithet, the rosy-flowered Saxifraga × arendsii is sometimes misidentified as Saxifraga rosacea.

It spreads by stolons, forming a compact cushion of short leafy sterile shoots. Flowering stems may be up to 25 cm tall, bearing 4 to 5 white flowers with petals 6-10mm long.

It is found in Northwestern and Central Europe. It was believed to have become extinct in the UK in 1962, but cuttings from original specimens have allowed for its reintroduction in 2024. It is usually found by mountain streams, but also grows on cliffs and scree slopes.

== Subspecies ==
- Saxifraga rosacea subsp. rosacea: southern and central Germany, eastern France, Ireland, Iceland, and Faroe Islands; extinct in Great Britain.
- Saxifraga rosacea subsp. hartii: Arranmore Island.
- Saxifraga rosacea subsp. sponhemica: Belgium, Luxembourg, eastern France, western Germany, Czechoslovakia, and southwestern Poland.
- Saxifraga rosacea subsp. steinmannii: Czech Republic.
