= Devynock & Sennybridge railway station =

Former railway station in Powys, Wales

Devynock & Sennybridge
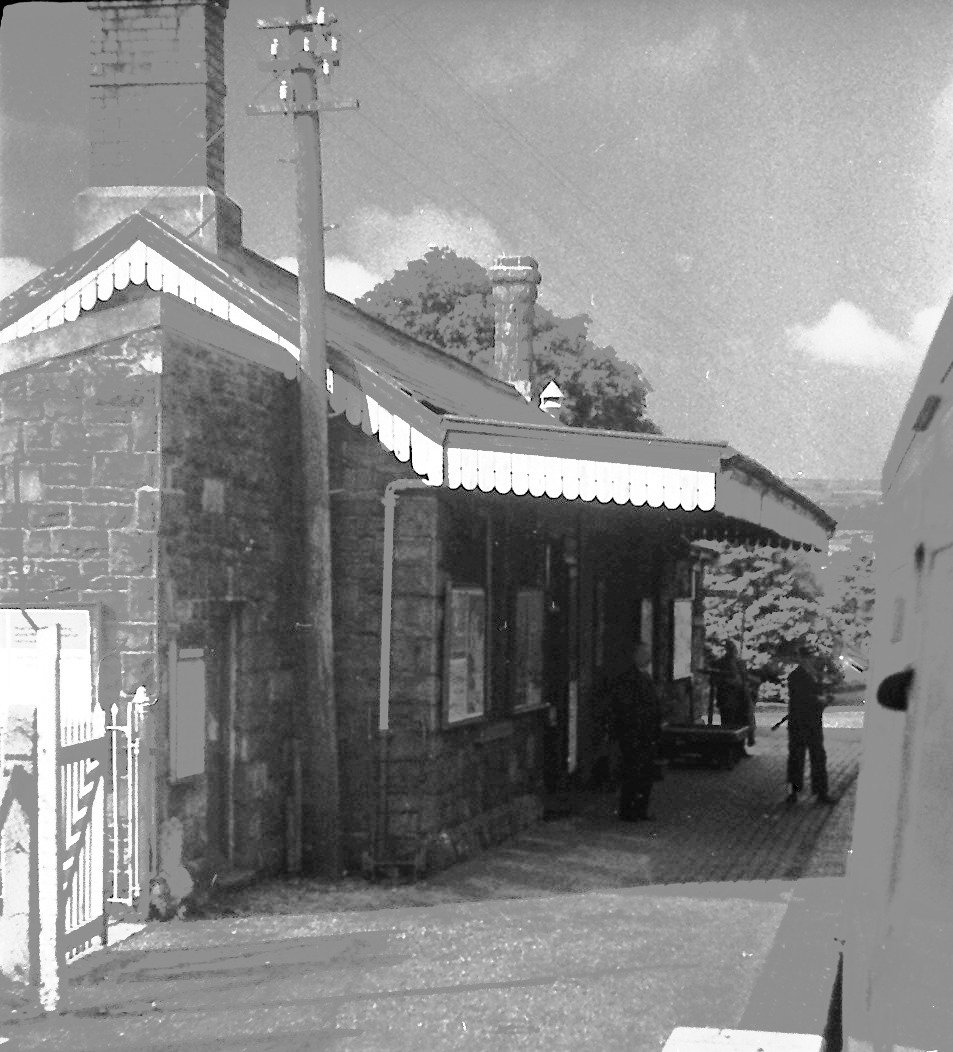
- Devynock station in 1962

General information
- Location: Defynnog, Powys; Wales
- Coordinates: 51.9478°N 3.5665°W
- Grid reference: SN923289
- Platforms: 2

Other information
- Status: Disused

History
- Original company: Neath and Brecon Railway
- Pre-grouping: Neath and Brecon Railway
- Post-grouping: Great Western Railway

Key dates
- 1867: opened
- 1962: Closed
Location

Devynock & Sennybridge railway station was a station in Defynnog, Powys, Wales. The station opened in 1867 and closed in 1962. It had a signal box and a small station building.

| Preceding station | Disused railways | Following station |
|---|---|---|
| Abercamlais; Line and station closed | Great Western Railway; Neath and Brecon Railway | Cray; Line and station closed |
