= Craig-y-nos railway station =

Former railway station in Brecknockshire, Wales

Craig-y-nos
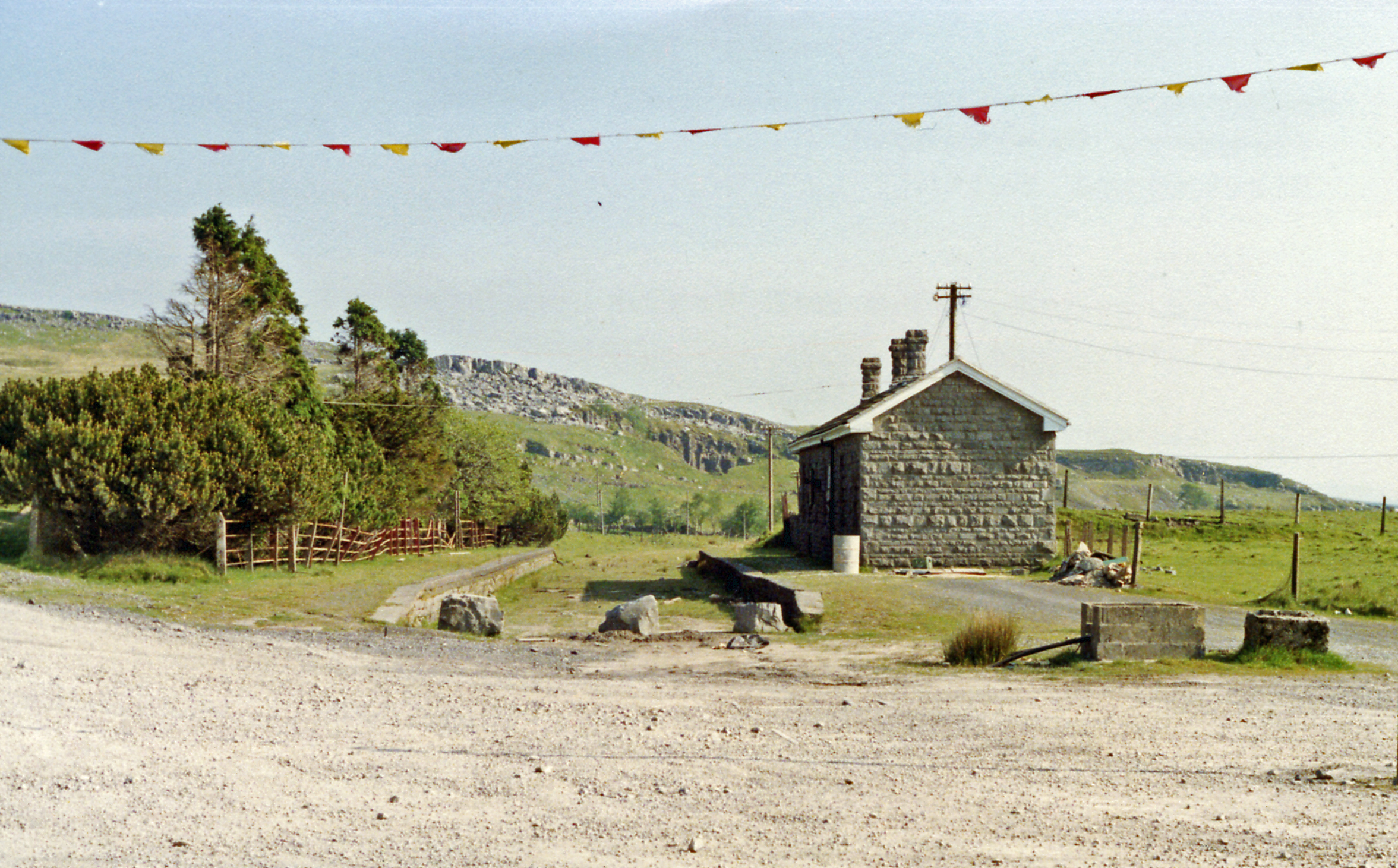
- Craig-y-nos station building in 1990

General information
- Location: Penwyllt, Brecknockshire; Wales
- Coordinates: 51.8284°N 3.6634°W
- Grid reference: SN853157
- Platforms: 2

Other information
- Status: Disused

History
- Original company: Neath and Brecon Railway
- Pre-grouping: Neath and Brecon Railway
- Post-grouping: Great Western Railway

Key dates
- 3 June 1867: Opened as Penwyllt
- 1 February 1907: Name changed to Craig-y-nos
- 15 October 1962: Closed
Location

Craig-y-nos railway station was a station in Penwyllt, Brecknockshire, Wales. The station was opened in 1867 and closed in 1962. The station building, built in 1886, was funded by Adelina Patti.

Preceding station	Disused railways	Following station
Cray; Line and station closed	Great Western Railway; Neath and Brecon Railway	Colbren Junction; Line and station closed
