= Abercrave railway station =

Disused railway station in Abercraf, Powys

Coordinates: 51°47′43.3″N 3°42′33.8″W

Abercrave
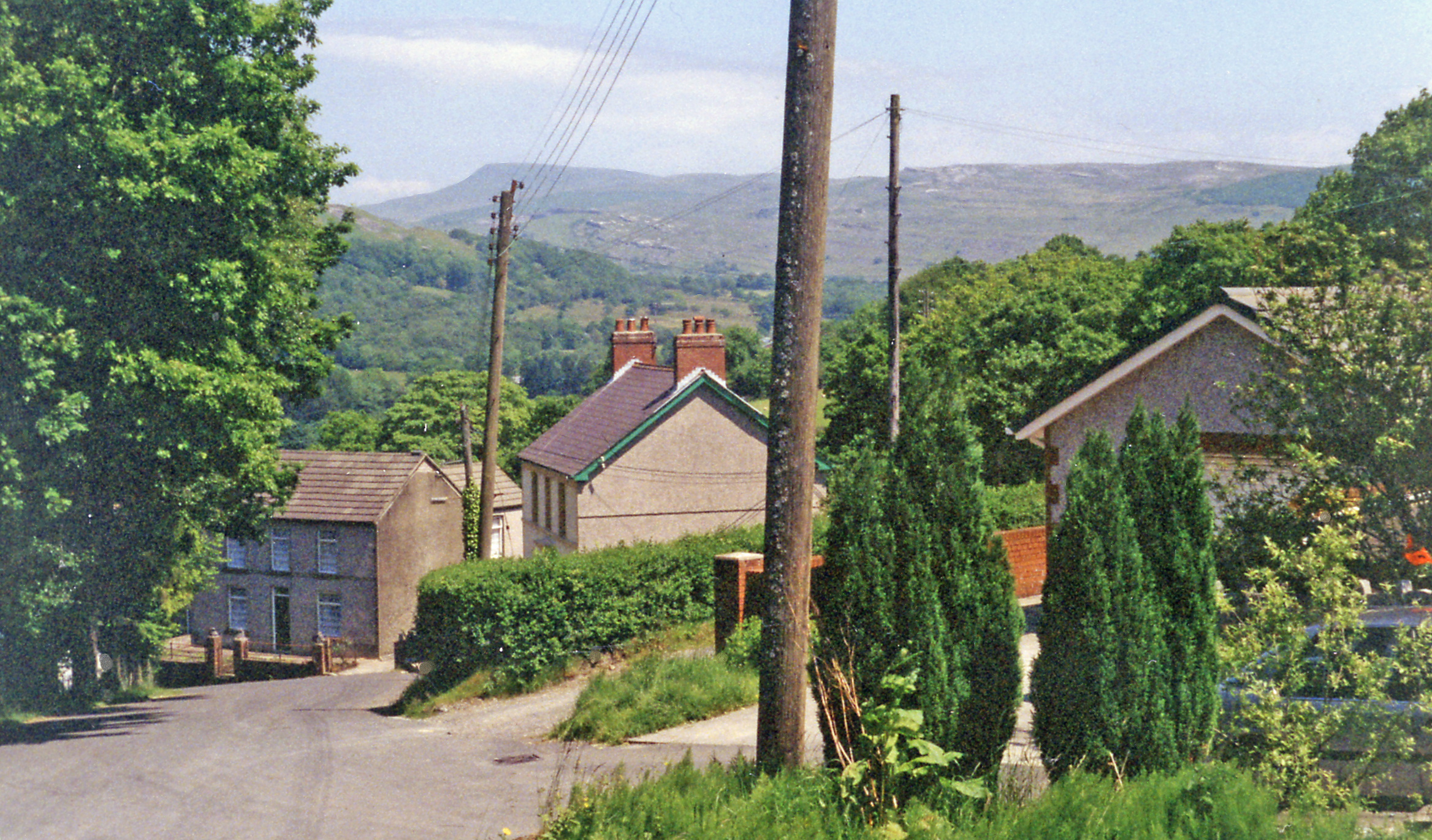
- Location of the former station (1994)

General information
- Location: Abercraf, Powys; Wales
- Platforms: ?

Other information
- Status: Disused

History
- Original company: Midland Railway
- Pre-grouping: Midland Railway
- Post-grouping: London, Midland and Scottish Railway

Key dates
- 2 March 1891: Station opens
- 12 September 1932: Station closes to passengers
Location

Abercrave railway station was a railway station that served the village of Abercraf in the traditional county of Brecknockshire, Wales. Opened in 1891 by the Midland Railway it closed to passengers in 1932 although the line through the station remained open for freight for some time after that.

== The site today ==
Nothing is left of the station as of 2023

Preceding station	Disused railways	Following station
Ystradgynlais	Midland Railway; Neath and Brecon Railway	Colbren Junction
