= Abercamlais railway station =

Disused railway station in Powys, Wales

Abercamlais

General information
- Location: Abercamlais, Powys; Wales
- Coordinates: 51.95211°N 3.50877°W
- Grid reference: SN963293
- Platforms: 1

Other information
- Status: Disused

History
- Opened: 3 June 1867
- Closed: 15 October 1962
- Original company: Neath and Brecon Railway
- Pre-grouping: Neath and Brecon Railway
- Post-grouping: Great Western Railway
Location

Abercamlais railway station was a private platform serving the Abercamlais estate in the traditional county of Brecknockshire, Wales.

== History ==
Opened by the Neath and Brecon Railway in 1867, it became part of the Great Western Railway during the Grouping of 1923. The line then passed on to the Western Region of British Railways on nationalisation in 1948. It was then closed by the British Transport Commission in 1962.

Preceding station	Disused railways	Following station
Devynock and Sennybridge; Line and station closed	Great Western Railway; Neath and Brecon Railway	Penpont Halt; Line and station closed
