= Cray railway station =

Disused railway station in Crai, Powys, Wales

Cray
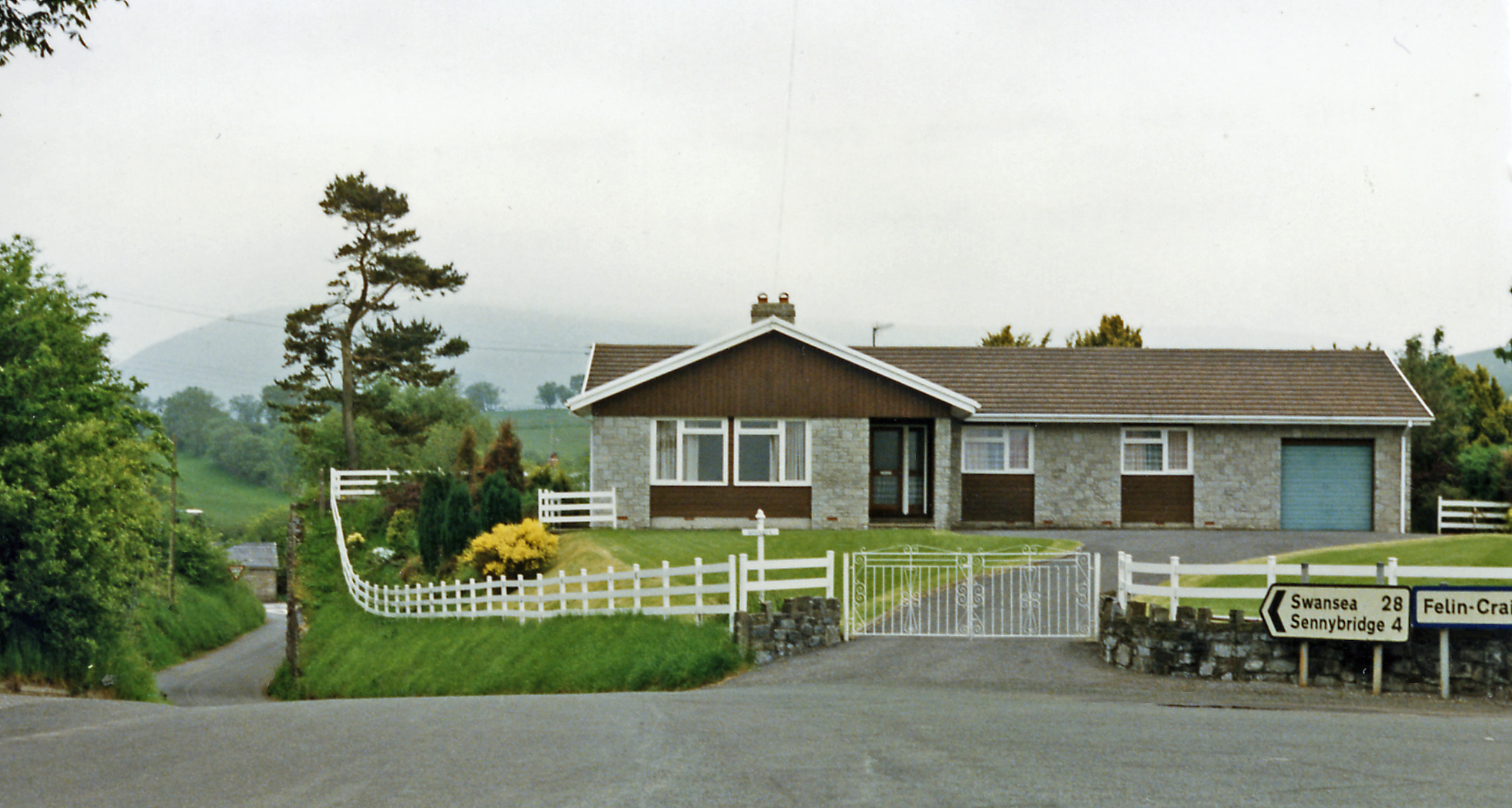
- The site of the station in 1986

General information
- Location: Crai, Breconshire; Wales
- Coordinates: 51.9062°N 3.6077°W
- Grid reference: SN895243
- Platforms: 1

Other information
- Status: Disused

History
- Original company: Neath and Brecon Railway
- Post-grouping: Great Western Railway

Key dates
- February 1870: Opened
- 15 October 1962: Closed
Location

Cray railway station served the village of Crai, in the historical county of Breconshire, Wales, from 1870 to 1962 on the Neath and Brecon Railway.

== History ==
The station first appeared in Bradshaw in February 1870, although it is mentioned as a station in an advertisement from 24 April 1869. It closed on 15 October 1962. The station building has been demolished and replaced by a single-storey house.

Preceding station	Disused railways	Following station
Devynock & Sennybridge; Line and station closed	Neath and Brecon Railway	Craig-y-nos; Line and station closed
