= Ystradgynlais railway station =

Former railway station in Wales

Ystradgynlais

General information
- Location: Ystradgynlais, Powys; Wales
- Coordinates: 51.7715°N 3.7516°W
- Grid reference: SN792095
- Platforms: 2

Other information
- Status: Disused

History
- Original company: Swansea Vale and Neath and Brecon Junction Railway
- Pre-grouping: Neath and Brecon Railway
- Post-grouping: Midland Railway

Key dates
- 19 Nov. 1873: Station opens (as Yniscedwyn)
- 1 May 1893: Renamed Ystradgynlais
- 12 September 1932: Station closes to passengers
Location

Ystradgynlais railway station served the town of Ystradgynlais in the traditional county of Breconshire, Wales. Opened in 1873 by the Swansea Vale and Neath and Brecon Junction Railway, it was eventually absorbed by the Midland Railway and it closed to passengers in 1932 although the line through the station remained open for freight for some time after that.

Preceding station	Disused railways	Following station
Abercrave	Midland Railway; Neath and Brecon Railway	Ynysgeinon
