= Pwll Dwfn =

Cave in the Black Mountain, South Wales

Coordinates: 51.834757922°N 3.69482398°W

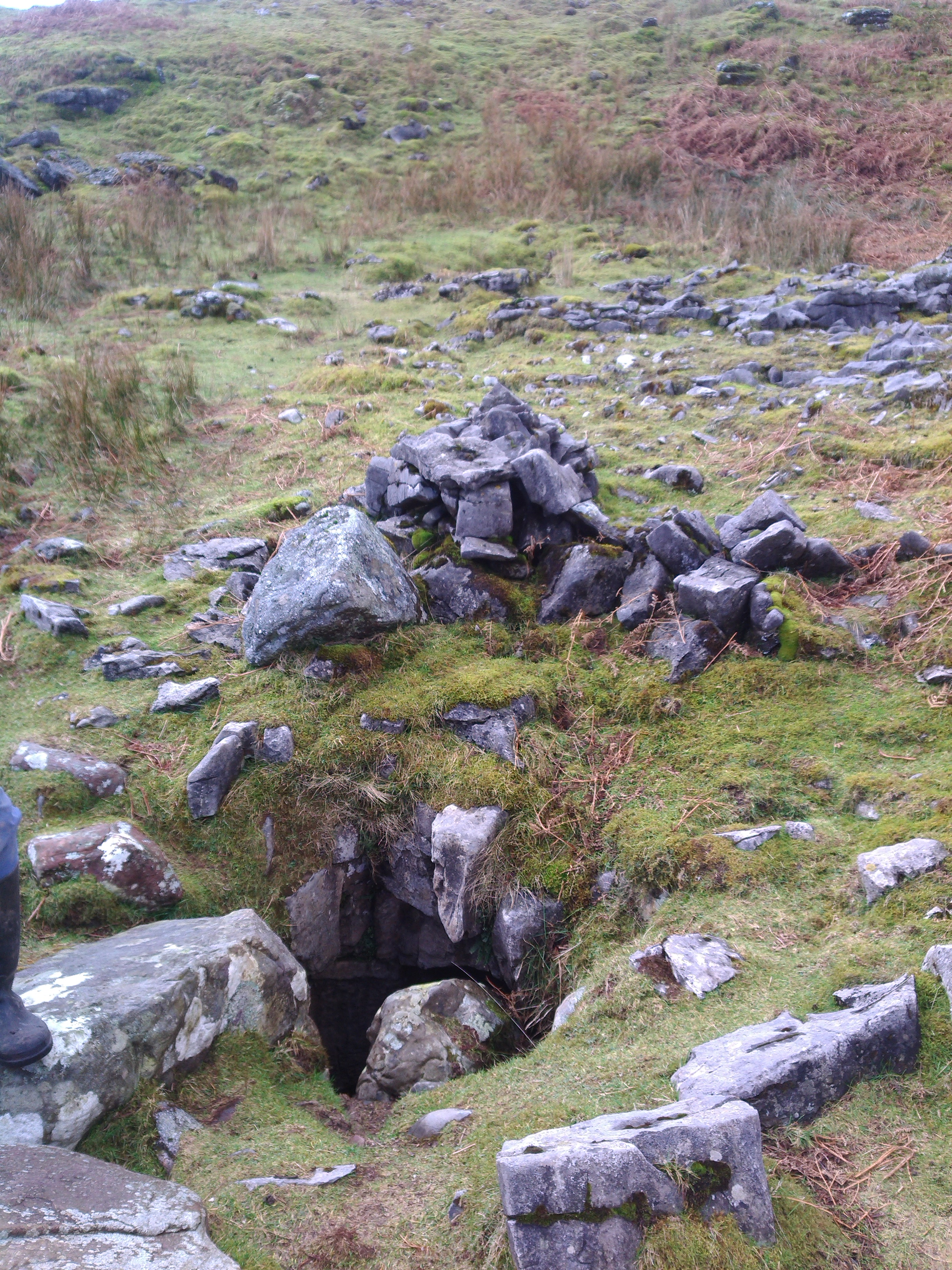
- Pwll Dwfn entrance
- Interactive map of Pwll Dwfn
- Location: Tawe Valley, South Wales
- OS grid: SN8332116494
- Depth: 104 metres (341 ft)
- Length: 561 metres (1,841 ft)
- Geology: Limestone
- Difficulty: Fully vertical, Single Rope Technique needed
- Access: Public
- Translation: deep pit (Welsh)
- Pronunciation: /pʊɬˈdʊvn/
- Cave survey: Davies & Wilton-Jones 2019-25
- Registry: Cambrian Cave Register

Pwll Dwfn (English: deep pit, pronounced [pʊɬˈdʊvn]) is a cave in the Black Mountain, South Wales. It is located in a dry valley northwest of Dan yr Ogof and cavers can access it from the show cave's car park. The entrance is not gated.

Pwll Dwfn is one of the few caves in the area which requires single rope technique (SRT). The pot itself consists of five pitches totalling 104 metres (341 ft) from top to bottom.

The cave is terminated at the bottom by two static sumps and has colonial Lithostrotion coral fossils on the walls. Diving in 1972 reached depth of 3.7 m and 4.6 m horizontal, ending on a boulder choke. Underwater digging in the sump continued from 2011, ending in a solid rock passage blocked by a large boulder, where exploration ended in 2013.

In 2011 a new Poacher's Passage was also found at the top of pitch 5, ending in a sand chamber and a boulder choke.

Above the bottom sumps Enterprise Aven was explored between 2011 and 2013, first one 8 m high, then 41 m high.

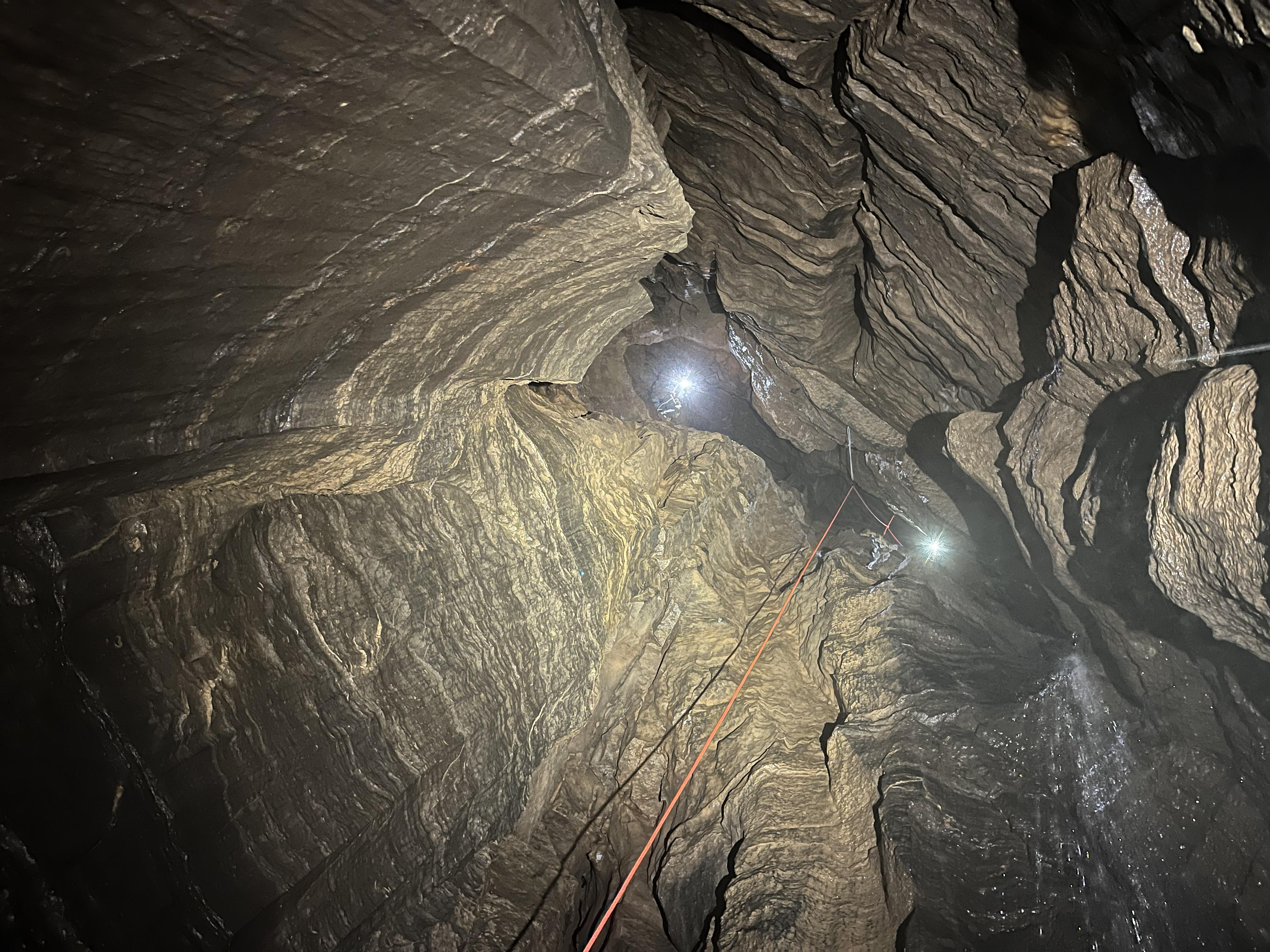
Bottom of pitch 4

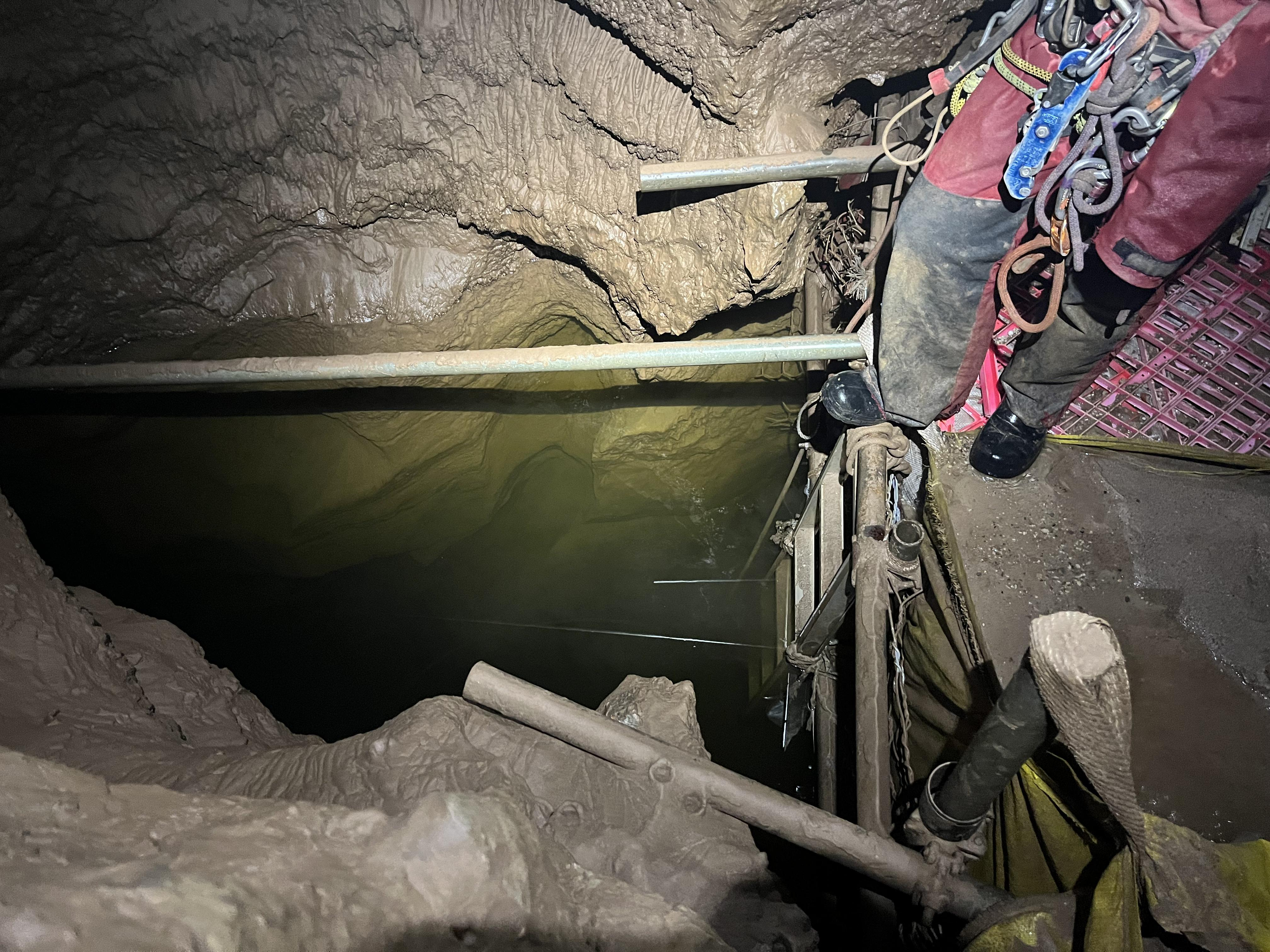
Bottom sump

== See also ==
- Dan yr Ogof
