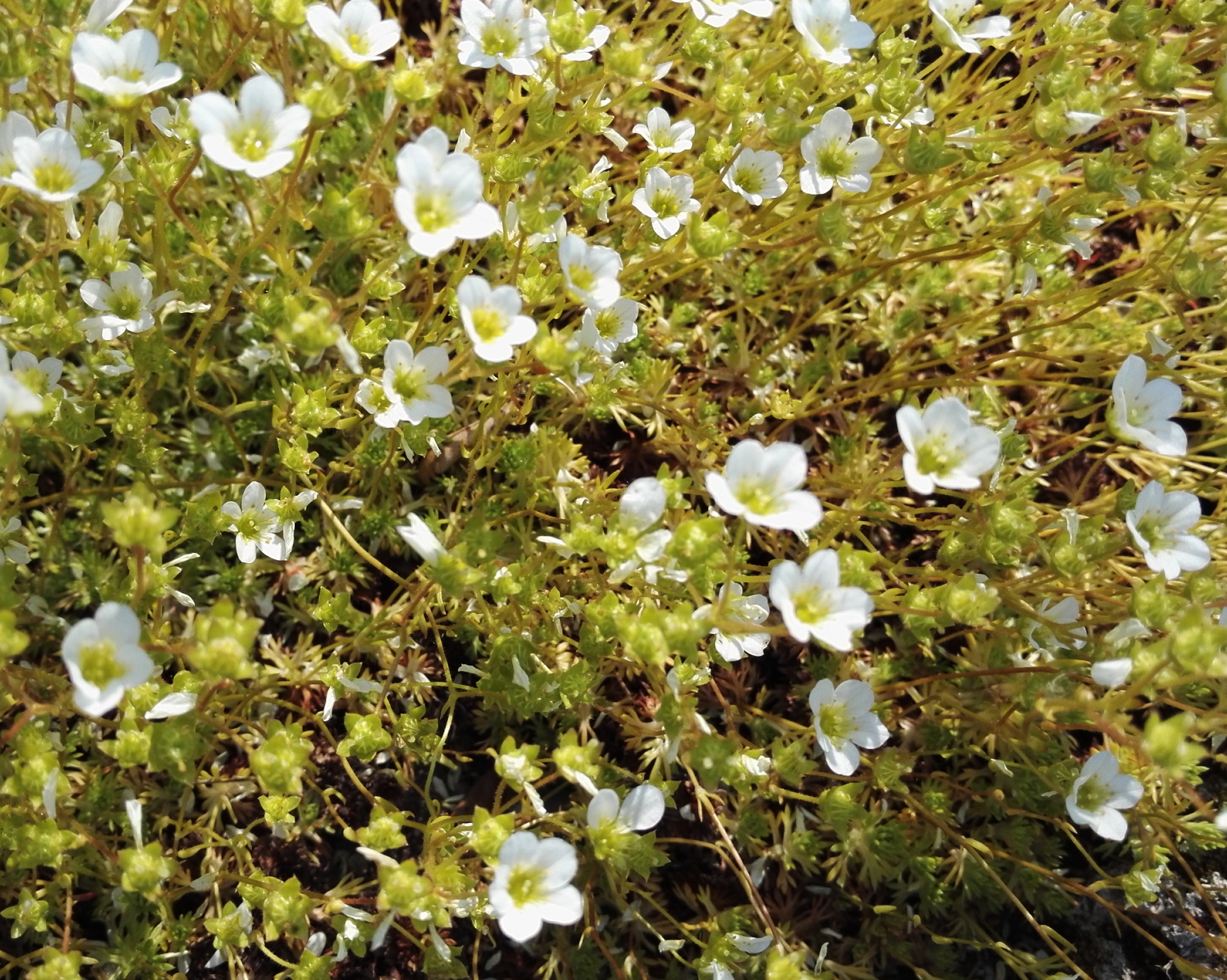
- At the Botanical Garden of the University of Fribourg
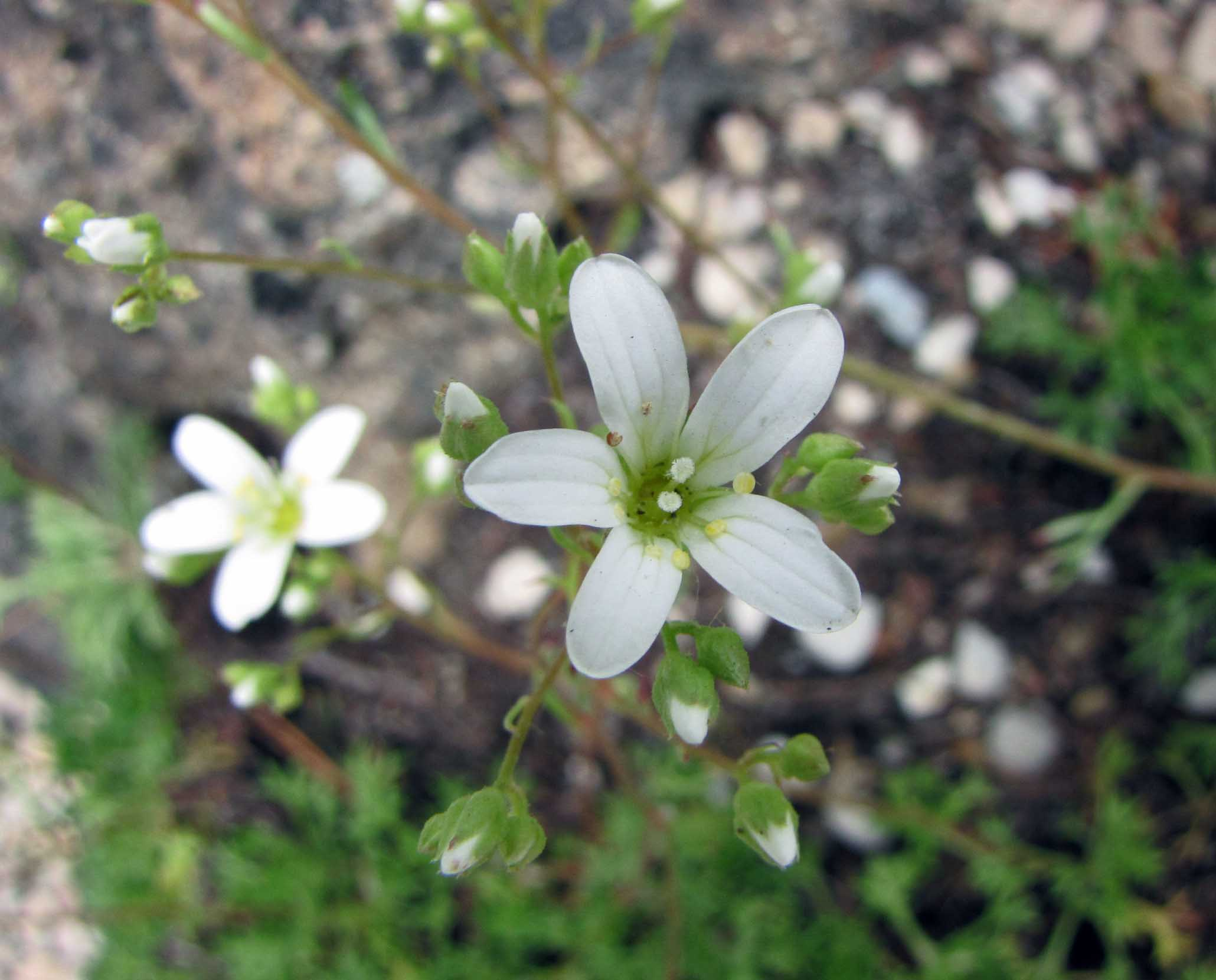
- Close-up of flower

Scientific classification
- Kingdom: Plantae
- Clade: Tracheophytes
- Clade: Angiosperms
- Clade: Eudicots
- Order: Saxifragales
- Family: Saxifragaceae
- Genus: Saxifraga
- Species: S. hypnoides

Binomial name
- Saxifraga hypnoides L.

Synonyms
- List: Chondrosea intermedia Haw.; Evaiezoa hirta Raf.; Hexaphoma viscida Raf.; Hirculus gracilis (Sternb. ex Ser.) Losinsk.; Muscaria basaitica Jord. & Fourr.; Muscaria helviensis Jord. & Fourr.; Muscaria hypnoides (L.) Jord. & Fourr.; Muscaria indivisa Jord. & Fourr.; Muscaria laeta Jord. & Fourr.; Muscaria parvula Jord. & Fourr.; Muscaria rhodanica Jord. & Fourr.; Muscaria vivariensis Jord. & Fourr.; Muscaria vulcanorum Jord. & Fourr.; Saxifraga affinis D.Don; Saxifraga aggregata Lej.; Saxifraga angustifida Engl.; Saxifraga angustifolia Haw.; Saxifraga cantabrica Boiss. & Reut. ex Engl.; Saxifraga congesta Schleich.; Saxifraga controversa Haw.; Saxifraga crateriformis Ser.; Saxifraga curvata Schleich. ex Ser.; Saxifraga densa Haw.; Saxifraga densifolia Schleich. ex Ser.; Saxifraga denudata D.Don; Saxifraga dubia Schleich. ex Ser.; Saxifraga elongella Sm.; Saxifraga flavescens Sternb.; Saxifraga gemmifera Pers.; Saxifraga gmelinii Host; Saxifraga gracilis Sternb. ex Ser.; Saxifraga hibernica Haw.; Saxifraga hybrida Haw.; Saxifraga intermedia Tausch ex Link; Saxifraga laetevirens D.Don; Saxifraga laevis Haw.; Saxifraga lapeyrousei Sternb.; Saxifraga latifida Haw.; Saxifraga laxa Schleich. ex Engl.; Saxifraga leptophylla Pers.; Saxifraga linearis Engl.; Saxifraga moschata D.Don; Saxifraga planipetala D.Dietr.; Saxifraga platypetala Sm.; Saxifraga procumbens Juss. ex Steud.; Saxifraga quinquedens Haw.; Saxifraga retroflexa Ser.; Saxifraga rupestris Salisb.; Saxifraga scariosa Schleich. ex Engl.; Saxifraga schraderi Sternb.; Saxifraga septifida Haw. ex Steud.; Saxifraga spatulata Haw.; Saxifraga tridens Haw.; Saxifraga tridentata D.Don; Saxifraga trifida Haw.; Saxifraga uniflora Sternb.; Saxifraga villosa Willd.; Saxifraga viscosa Haw.

= Saxifraga hypnoides =

Species of flowering plant

Saxifraga hypnoides, called mossy saxifrage, cut-leaved saxifrage, Dovedale moss, Eve's cushion, Indian moss, lady's cushion, and queen's cushion, is a species of flowering plant in the family Saxifragaceae. It is native to northwestern Europe; Iceland, the Faroe Islands, Norway, Ireland, Great Britain, Belgium, and France, and has been introduced to Czechia, the Eastern Himalayas, and Tibet. In the north of its range a tetraploid form predominates, and in the south a diploid form is more likely to be found.

For forms in gardens (red, pinkish or white flowered) see Saxifraga × arendsii.
