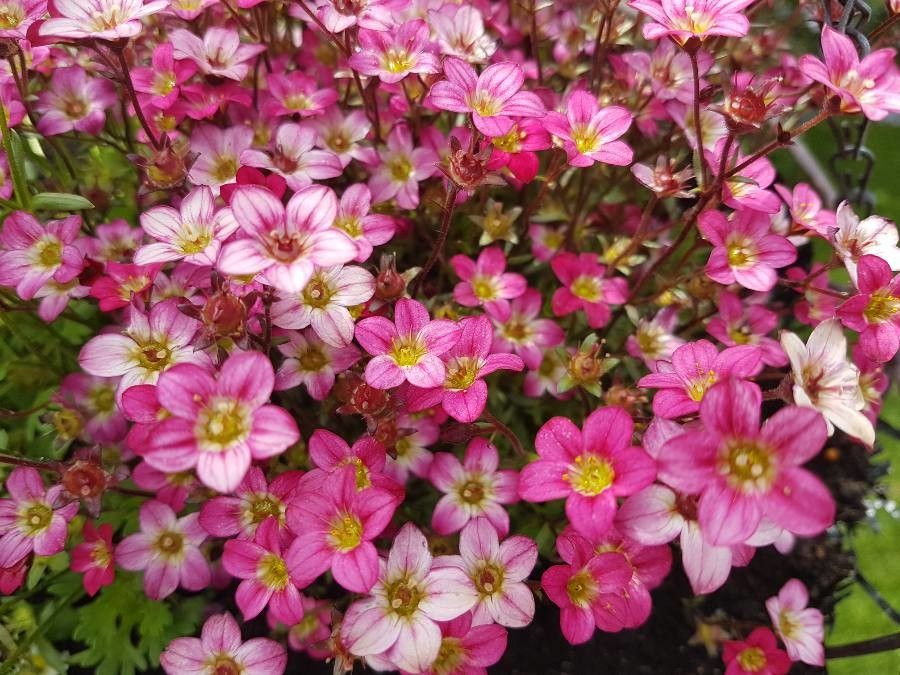

Scientific classification
- Kingdom: Plantae
- Clade: Tracheophytes
- Clade: Angiosperms
- Clade: Eudicots
- Order: Saxifragales
- Family: Saxifragaceae
- Genus: Saxifraga
- Species: S. × arendsii

Binomial name
- Saxifraga × arendsii Engl.

= Saxifraga × arendsii =

Species of flowering plant

Saxifraga × arendsii, or as a cultivar group Saxifraga Mossy Group, known as the mossy saxifrage, is a perennial garden flowering plant. It is a group of horticultural hybrids having a complex crossbred heritage, mainly of Saxifraga moschata, Saxifraga rosacea, and Saxifraga granulata.

== Description ==
Saxifraga × arendsii can reach a height of 5–10 centimetres (2.0–3.9 in). This evergreen perennial herbaceous plant has leaves arranged in a dense basal rosette. The surface-spreading, cushion to mound-forming, mossy leaves are glossy, bright green, linear, oval or oblong. Flowers are at the ends of short, strong stems. They are solitary, tiny, cup-shaped or star-shaped, and may be white, bright pink or dark red. They bloom from March to August.

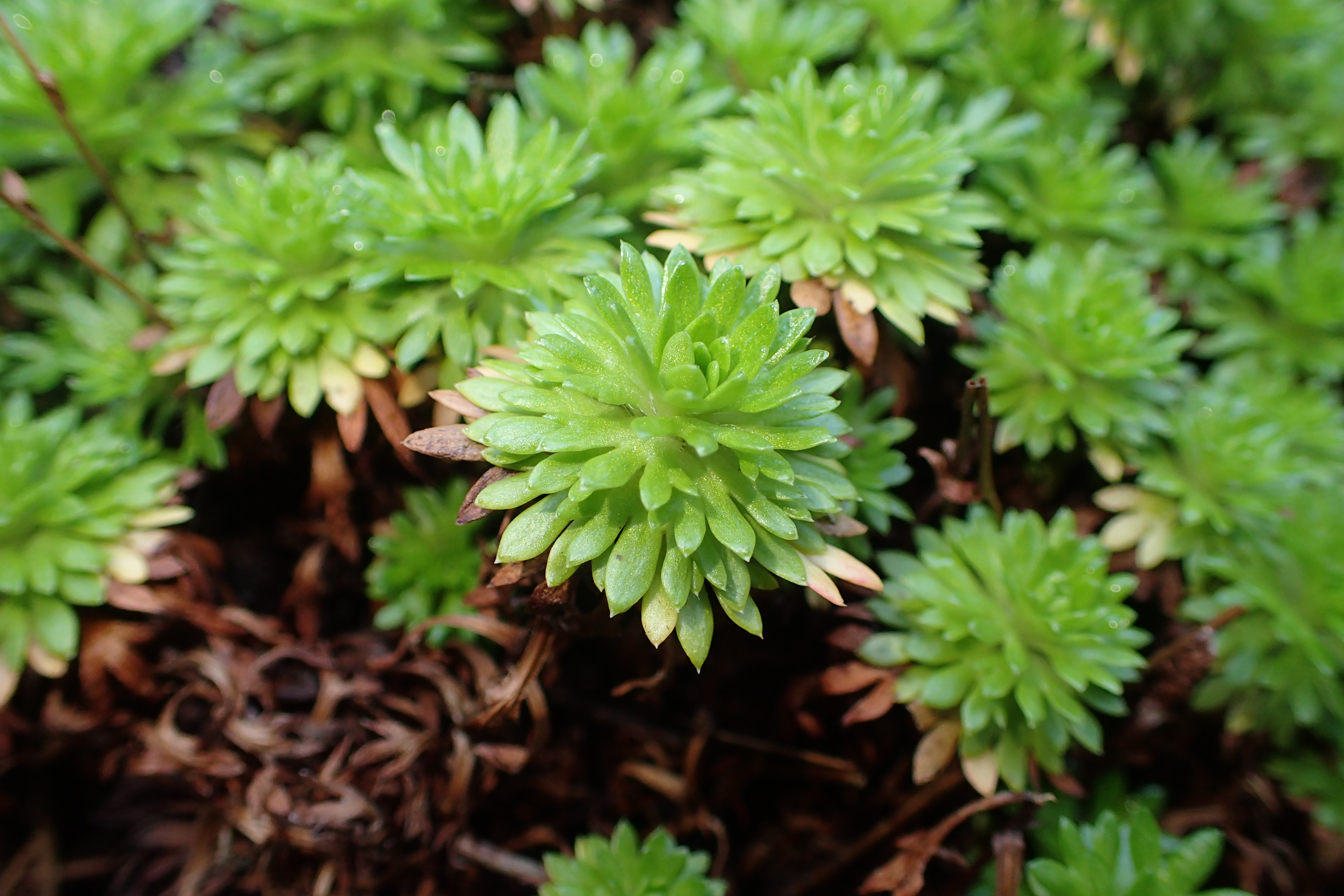

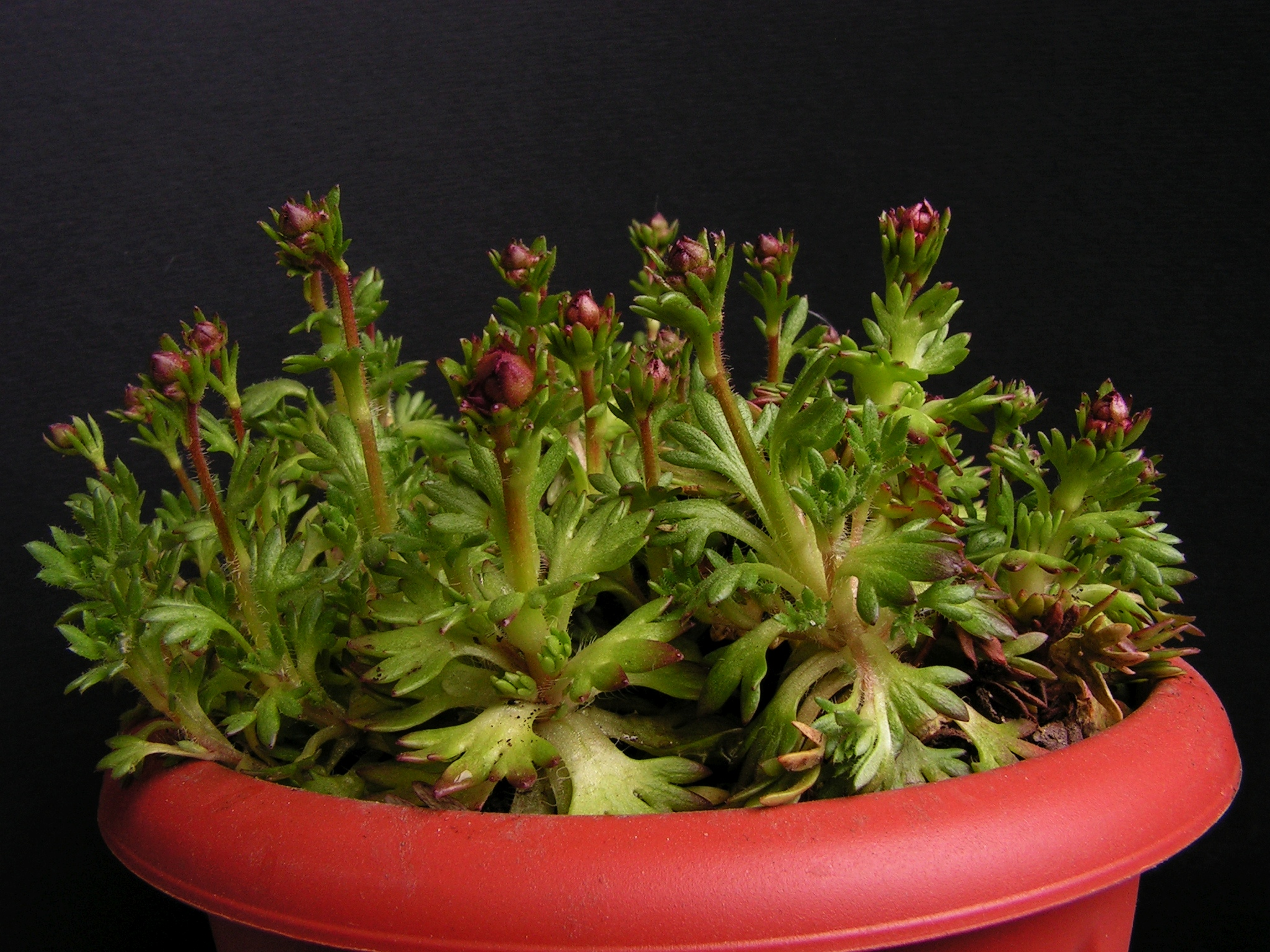

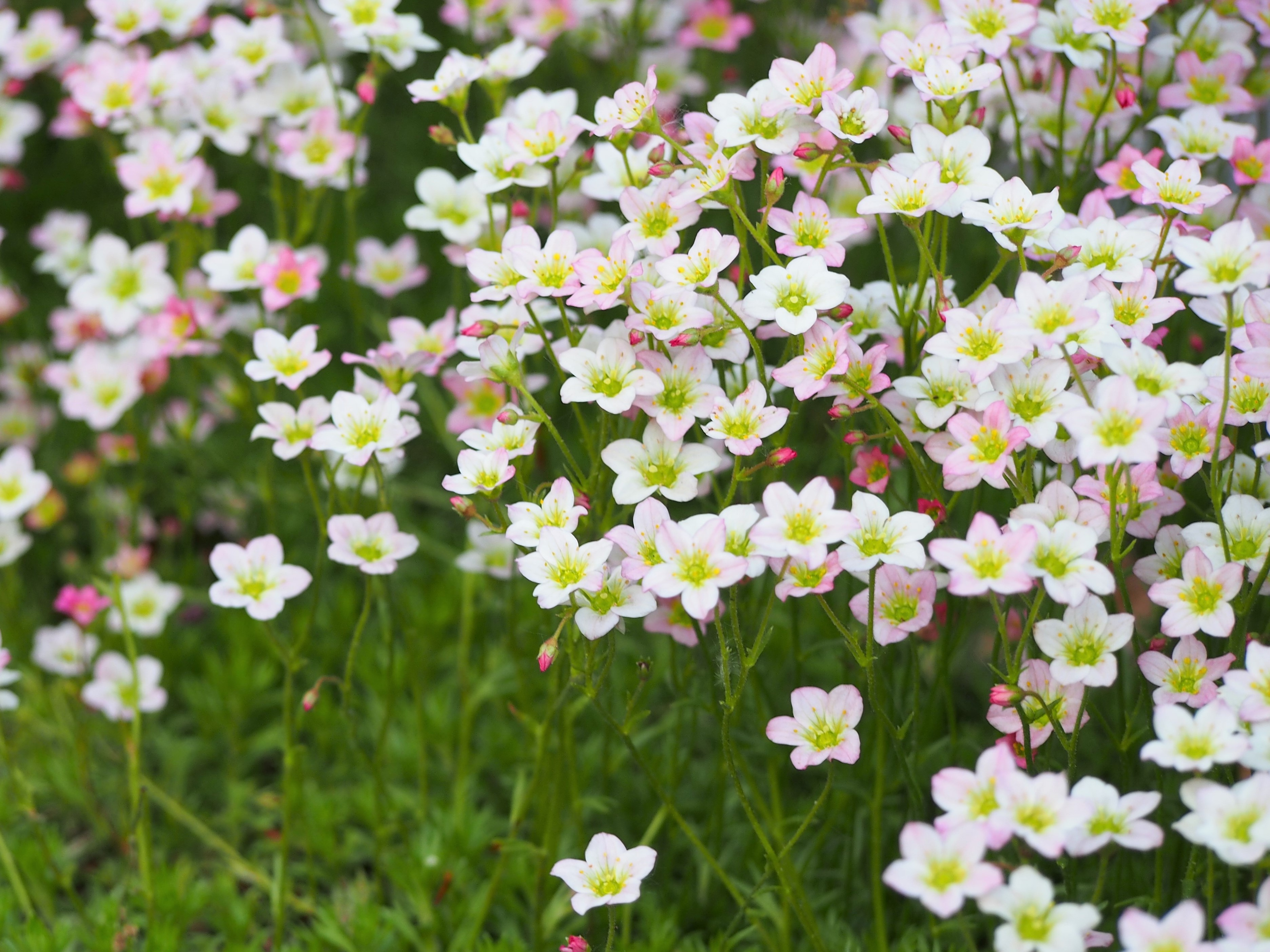

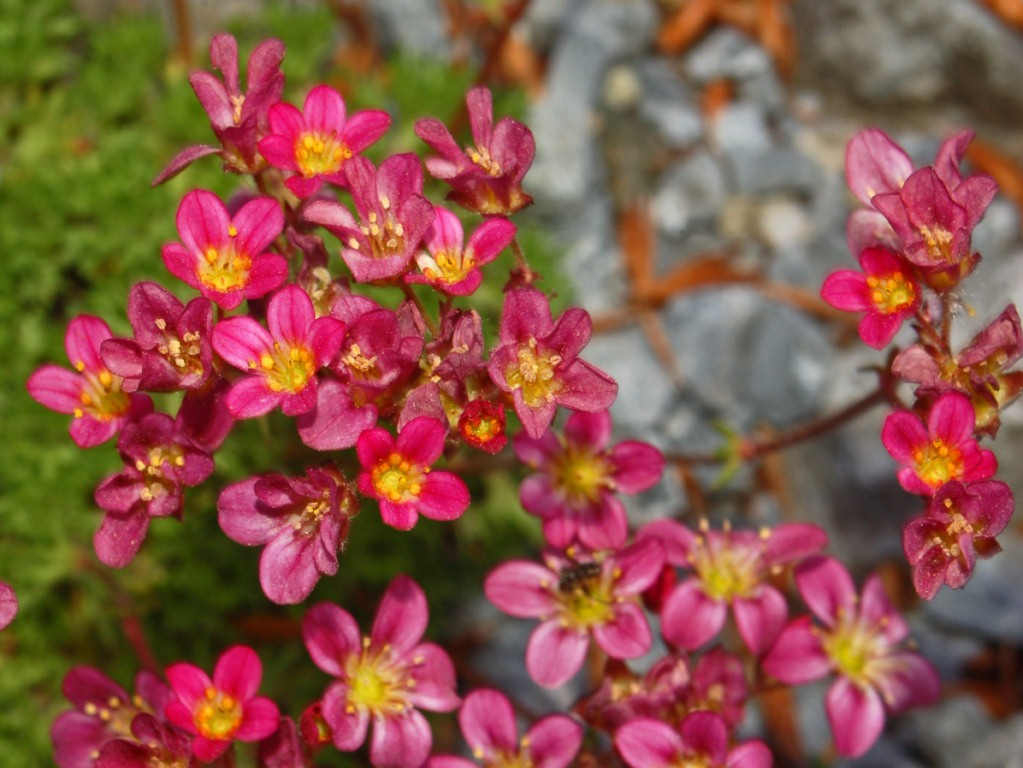
