= Gavin Roberts =

Welsh rugby union footballer

- Born: 24 October 1984 (age 42) Mold, Flintshire, Wales
- School: Argoed High School
- University: Glyndwr University

Rugby union career
- Position: Centre
- Current team: Caldy
Senior career
Years	Team	Apps	(Points)
2006-08	Mold		
2008-2021	Caldy	255	(1452)
- Correct as of 27 April 2019

Gavin Roberts (born 1984) is a Welsh rugby union footballer, currently playing at Centre for Caldy in National League 1. Roberts is one of the most prolific points and try scorers in National League 2 North history with over 1,200 points including 114 tries.

== Career ==
=== Mold ===
Growing up in Flintshire, Roberts attended Argoed High School in Bryn Y Baal. He first started playing senior rugby at Mold playing in the regional Welsh leagues, and was a regular in the side that went unbeaten in the league during the 2005-06 season and became the WRU Division Four North champions. The next year, he was in the Mold that did the double, once more winning the WRU Division Four North league title, and also winning the North Wales Cup, 29-6 over Colwyn Bay.

=== Caldy ===
In 2007 Roberts left Wales to move across the border to England, signing for the Wirral-based club, Caldy, playing in National Division 3 North. He first season at Caldy was as a squad player, filling in behind then regular, Simon Mason, making 16 league appearances and scoring 70 points, mostly from the boot. After an acceptable debut season in which his club would finish 5th in the league, the 2008-09 season would see Roberts become a first-team regular in a Caldy side that would finish up as league runners up to champions, Nuneaton. Usually there was a promotion playoff between the runners up of National Division 3 North and National Division 3 South but due to re-shake of the entire league system by the RFU there would be no playoff that year. On a personal note the 2008-09 season was a career best for Roberts as he scored 290 points from just 22 games to finish as the league's top scorer. Despite missing out on promotion the year would end on a high for Roberts as he made a match winning performance in the Cheshire with 15 points (including a try) as his side overturned a 15-0 half time deficit to defeat Hertfordshire 30-22 in the final of the County Championship Shield held at Twickenham Stadium.

The arrival of Richard Vasey from Moseley in the summer of 2009 would see Roberts give up his role as the main kicker at the club. However Roberts ability to score tries as well as kick points meant that he remained a first team regular in the Caldy team, contributing 13 as his side finished 3rd in the newly named National League 2 North, just missing out on the promotion playoff spot. Roberts would mix rugby with studying at Glyndwr University just across the border in Wrexham, gaining a sports award despite not playing for the university rugby team. Roberts try scorer would improve the following season as he scored a career best total of 24 tries from 28 games making him the 5th top try scorer in the league that year. Although Caldy only managed 5th in the division the season would end in silverware as Roberts was part of a Caldy side that shared the Cheshire Cup with Sale Jets after the final was cancelled due to fixture congestion.

The 2011-12 season saw Roberts once more become the main kicker for Caldy as teammate Richard Vasey suffered a broken leg in the autumn. Roberts played 24 games in the league, scoring 163 points which included 16 tries, as Caldy finished runners up in the league, 1 point ahead of Preston Grasshoppers and qualified for the promotion playoff game. Although he missed the Cheshire Cup victory, Roberts was in the team that traveled down to south runners up, Richmond, eventually losing 13-20 to the London side in a razor tight match that went into extra time.

The disappointment of missing out on the playoffs saw a downturn in Caldy's league fortunes during the 2012-13 season. Once more restored as backup kicker to the returning Vasey, Roberts still managed 152 points in the league, including 20 tries, as Caldy dropped to 10th. The season would end in silverware as Caldy managed to retain the Cheshire Cup with a 40-24 win over local rivals, Birkenhead Park. The next couple of seasons would see Roberts continue to play and score regularly in a Caldy team that had midtable finishes in the league. In 2015 Roberts played a key role in his club's Cheshire Cup victory, with 13 points from the point in the final 28-18 victory over Sale.

In 2016-17 Roberts was part of the Caldy team that won National League 2 North and were promoted to National League 1 - the highest level the club had achieved in their history. Roberts had found chances limited over the past couple of seasons but he played in the last two league games, deputising for the outstanding Jack Lavin (the division's top scorer), kicking a number of points to finish off the title winning campaign. The 2017-18 season saw Caldy consolidate themselves in National League 1 with Roberts playing a big part following the departure of Lavin, scoring 156 points including 9 tries as Caldy finished a very respectable 11th. The following season was not quite as successful for Roberts as Caldy were relegated from National League 1.

Roberts retirement was announced on the 2nd of July 2021, after 13 seasons and 312 appearances for Caldy

== Season-by-season playing stats ==
Season	Club	Competition	Appearances	Tries	Drop Goals	Conversions	Penalties	Total Points
2005-06	Mold	WRU Division Four North	?	?	?	?	?	?
2006-07	Mold	WRU Division Four North	?	?	?	?	?	?
2007-08	Caldy	National Division 3 North	16	3	0	11	11	70
2007-08	Caldy	EDF Energy Trophy	2	0	0	0	0	0
2008-09	Caldy	National Division 3 North	22	10	0	54	44	290
2008-09	Caldy	EDF Energy Trophy	3	1	0	7	2	25
2009-10	Caldy	National League 2 North	29	13	0	1	0	67
2010-11	Caldy	National League 2 North	28	24	0	32	0	184
2011-12	Caldy	National League 2 North	24	16	0	22	13	163
2012-13	Caldy	National League 2 North	26	20	0	14	8	152
2013-14	Caldy	National League 2 North	25	13	0	0	0	65
2014-15	Caldy	National League 2 North	26	11	0	23	7	122
2015-16	Caldy	National League 2 North	23	3	0	24	29	150
2016-17	Caldy	National League 2 North	12	1	0	5	2	21
2017-18	Caldy	National League 1	25	9	0	36	13	156
2018-19	Caldy	National League 1	23	2	0	1	0	12

== Honours and records ==
Mold

- WRU Division Four North champions (2): 2005-06, 2006–07
- North Wales Cup winners: 2007

Caldy

- Cheshire Cup winners (3): 2011, 2013, 2015
- National League 2 North champions (2): 2016-17, 2019-20
- National League 2 North top scorer (2): 2008-09 (290 points), 2019-20 (269 points)

Cheshire

- County Championship Shield winners: 2009

North Wales

- Capped by representative side
