= Rob McCusker =

Welsh rugby player (born 1985)

- Born: Robert McCusker; 10 December 1985 (age 40) Wrexham, Wales
- Height: 1.93 m (6 ft 4 in)
- Weight: 100 kg (15 st 10 lb; 220 lb)
- School: Castell Alun High School

Rugby union career
- Position(s): Blindside flanker Number 8
Senior career
Years	Team	Apps	(Points)
2003–2007	Mold RFC		
2005–2009	Llanelli RFC	76	(15)
2007–2015	Scarlets	133	(30)
2015–2016	London Irish	8	(0)
2016–2019	Ospreys	36	(5)
- Correct as of 23 March 2023
International career
Years	Team	Apps	(Points)
2003–2005	Wales U20	2	(0)
2010–2013	Wales	6	(0)
- Correct as of 23 March 2023
National sevens team
Years	Team		Comps
2007	Wales		

Robert McCusker (born 10 December 1985) is a Welsh former rugby union player, who played across the back row. McCusker began his career with the Scarlets, and also played for London Irish and the Ospreys before retiring. McCusker also played internationally for Wales.

== Club career ==
Born in Wrexham, McCusker began his rugby career playing for Mold RFC in WRU Division Four North, before being picked up by the Scarlets and Llanelli RFC. He made his debut for the Scarlets in a match against the Exeter Chiefs on 18 August 2007. He was made club captain by the Scarlets for the 2012–13 season. Despite primarily being a flanker, McCusker often played at number 8 for the Scarlets.

McCusker left the Scarlets at the start of the 2015–16, moving to London Irish, signing a one-year contract.

After one season with London Irish, McCusker returned to Wales, signing for the Ospreys as injury cover for Sam Underhill. He later extended his short-term contract into a full time deal with the club.

McCusker departed the Ospreys at the end of the 2018–19 Pro14 season, retiring from rugby.

== International career ==
McCusker has also played for the Welsh under-20 side, as well as the Welsh Sevens team, making appearances in the Hong Kong, England and Scotland legs of the 2006–07 IRB World Sevens Series, and the Dubai and George, South Africa legs of the 2007–08 Series.

McCusker was initially named by Wales coach Warren Gatland on a 50-man list of potential 2011 World Cup players. He was named in the Wales squad to play against South Africa, New Zealand and Australia in Summer 2010 after being promoted from the standby list due to injury to Andy Powell. He made his debut for Wales against South Africa on 5 June 2010 as a second-half replacement.

On 26 June 2010, McCusker impressed after replacing number eight and Wales captain Ryan Jones in the 25th minute of the second Test in Hamilton against the All-Blacks. Good form during the first part of the following season meant he kept his place in the Wales squad for the autumn internationals that year.

McCusker was again called up for Wales as an injury replacement, for the 2011 Six Nations Championship. He came off the bench in the final match against France. McCusker was named in the training squad ahead of the 2011 Rugby World Cup, but not selected for the final squad. McCusker was not selected for the squad for the 2012 Six Nations, but returned to the side for the 2012 end-of-year rugby union internationals, coming off the bench against Argentina.

McCusker was selected for the 2013 Wales rugby union tour of Japan, and started at number eight in the first test. This was to be his final cap for Wales.
