= 2012–13 National League 2 North =

Rugby union competition in England

- Countries: England
- Champions: Hull Ionians
- Runners-up: Stourbridge
- Relegated: Huddersfield, Stockport, Westoe
- Attendance: 66,326 (average 279 per match)
- Highest attendance: 1,250; Darlington Mowden Park v Bromsgrove; 2 February 2013
- Lowest attendance: 90; Westoe v Darlington Mowden Park; 22 December 2012
- Top point scorer: (England) Sean Taylor (Preston Grasshoppers); 341 points
- Top try scorer: (England) James Twomey (Otley); 28 tries

The 2012–13 National League 2 North was the third season (twenty-sixth overall) of the fourth tier (north) of the English domestic rugby union competitions since the professionalised format of the second division was introduced. The league system was 4 points for a win, 2 points for a draw and additional bonus points being awarded for scoring 4 or more tries and/or losing within 7 points of the victorious team. In terms of promotion the league champions would go straight up into National League 1 while the runners up would have a one-game playoff against the runners up from National League 2 South (at the home ground of the club with the superior league record) for the final promotion place.

The league title battle was extremely tight this year with Hull Ionians eventually taking the championship and promotion to the 2013–14 National League 1 ahead of Stourbridge with both sides dead level on points but Ionians having more wins despite Stourbridge having a much better for/against record and more bonus points. As runners up Stourbridge faced the 2012–13 National League 2 South runners up Worthing Raiders in what would be a very close game - losing 26 - 28 to the south coast side - meaning that the Stourton Park-based side would not have an instant return to National League 1. At the other end of the table Huddersfield were easily the weakest team in the division and were the first to be relegated, with the more competitive Stockport and Westoe being the other two sides to follow them by the end of the season. All three sides would drop down to National League 3 North for the following season.

== Participating teams and locations ==
Twelve of the teams listed below participated in the 2011–12 National League 2 North season; Stourbridge and Birmingham & Solihull were relegated from the 2011–12 National League 1 while Dudley Kingswinford came up from National League 3 Midlands as playoff winners along with Darlington Mowden Park who were champions of National League 3 North. Rugby Lions had won the National League 3 Midlands title and were expected to join the 2012–13 National League 2 South instead of National League 2 North but went into liquidation over the summer and dropped out of the leagues leaving the southern division with just 15 teams. The season also saw newly demoted Birmingham & Solihull move from ground-sharing with a local football team at Damson Park to their former training base Portway. Another team would switch grounds during the season, with Darlington Mowden Park playing their first game at the 25,000 capacity The Northern Echo Arena (former home of the ill-fated football team Darlington F.C.) on 2 February 2013 against Bromsgrove.

Locations of the 2012-13 National League 2 North teams

Team	Stadium	Capacity	City/Area
Birmingham & Solihull	Portway		Portway, Birmingham, West Midlands
Bromsgrove	Finstall Park		Bromsgrove, Worcestershire
Caldy	Paton Field	4,000	Thurstaston, Wirral, Merseyside
Darlington Mowden Park	Yiewsley Drive; The Northern Echo Arena	N/A; 25,000	Darlington, County Durham
Dudley Kingswinford	Heathbrook	2,260 (260 seats)	Kingswinford, Dudley, West Midlands
Huddersfield	Lockwood Park	1,500 (500 seats)	Huddersfield, West Yorkshire
Hull	Ferens Ground	1,500 (288 seats)	Kingston upon Hull, East Riding of Yorkshire
Hull Ionians	Brantingham Park	1,500 (240 seats)	Brantingham, East Riding of Yorkshire
Leicester Lions	Westleigh Park	2,000	Blaby, Leicestershire
Luctonians	Mortimer Park	2,200	Kingsland, Herefordshire
Otley	Cross Green	7,000 (852 seats)	Otley, West Yorkshire
Preston Grasshoppers	Lightfoot Green	2,250 (250 seats)	Preston, Lancashire
Sheffield Tigers	Dore Moor	1,000	Sheffield, South Yorkshire
Stockport	The Memorial Ground	500	Stockport, Greater Manchester
Stourbridge	Stourton Park	3,500 (499 seats)	Stourbridge, West Midlands
Westoe	Wood Terrace		South Shields, Tyne and Wear

== Final league table ==
2012–13 National League 2 North table
Pos	Team	Pld	W	D	L	PF	PA	PD	TB	LB	Pts	Qualification
1	Hull Ionians (C)	30	28	0	2	914	488	+426	19	1	132	Promoted
2	Stourbridge	30	26	0	4	1046	361	+685	25	3	132	Promotion play-off
3	Darlington Mowden Park	30	22	0	8	916	511	+405	20	5	113	
4	Preston Grasshoppers	30	20	1	9	1010	648	+362	18	5	105	
5	Otley	30	17	1	12	825	863	−38	19	4	93	
6	Sheffield Tigers	30	17	0	13	744	750	−6	13	4	85	
7	Hull (Note: Hull's game away to Leicester Lions would be cancelled due to fixture congestion.)	29	13	0	16	788	810	−22	14	8	74	
8	Luctonians	30	13	1	16	733	703	+30	15	4	73	
9	Leicester Lions (Note: Leicester Lions game at home to Hull would be cancelled due to fixture congestion.)	29	14	0	15	625	731	−106	11	5	72	
10	Caldy	30	14	1	15	741	731	+10	8	5	71	
11	Bromsgrove	30	12	2	16	620	719	−99	8	6	66	
12	Birmingham & Solihull	30	12	1	17	644	681	−37	7	7	64	
13	Dudley Kingswinford (Note: Dudley Kingswinford's game at home to Huddersfield would be cancelled due to fixture congestion.)	29	8	2	19	603	852	−249	10	9	55	
14	Westoe (R)	30	9	0	21	601	974	−373	11	6	53	Relegated
15	Stockport (R)	30	6	0	24	624	954	−330	9	8	41	Relegated
16	Huddersfield (Note: Hudderfield's game away to Dudley Kingswinford would be cancelled due to fixture congestion.) (R)	29	2	1	26	421	1079	−658	3	5	18	Relegated

Updated to match(es) played on 11-05-2013. Source: Rugby Statbunker
(C) Champion; (R) Relegated

== Results ==
=== Round 1 ===
1 September 2012
14:00

Birmingham & Solihull	5 - 25	Stourbridge
	Report

Portway (Note: This was Birmingham & Solihull's first game at Portway.)
Attendance: 534
Referee: Shane Lewis

1 September 2012
14:00

Stockport	16 - 24	Luctonians (BP)
	Report

The Memorial Ground
Attendance: 132
Referee: Guy Steel Bodger

1 September 2012
14:30

(BP) Preston Grasshoppers	34 - 0	Darlington Mowden Park
	Report

Lightfoot Green
Attendance: 402
Referee: D Edmunds

1 September 2012
15:00

(2BP) Dudley Kingswinford	32 - 34	Otley (BP)
	Report

Heathbrook
Attendance: 430
Referee: Mike Cooper

1 September 2012
15:00

Huddersfield	13 - 32	Caldy (BP)
	Report

Lockwood Park
Attendance: 231
Referee: Karl Kirkpatrick

1 September 2012
15:00

(2BP) Hull	29 - 30	Bromsgrove (BP)
	Report

Ferens Ground
Attendance: 160
Referee: Brendan Fitzmaurice

1 September 2012
15:00

(BP) Hull Ionians	28 - 24	Sheffield Tigers (BP)
	Report

Brantingham Park
Attendance: 250
Referee: Andy Rawson

1 September 2012
15:00

(BP) Leicester Lions	32 - 3	Westoe
	Report

Westleigh Park
Attendance: 100
Referee: Rowan Kitt

=== Round 2 ===
8 September 2012
15:00

(BP) Caldy	35 - 29	Stockport (2BP)
	Report

Paton Field
Attendance: 301
Referee: Andy Rawson

8 September 2012
15:00

(BP) Darlington Mowden Park	38 - 24	Westoe
	Report

Yiewsley Drive
Attendance: 355
Referee: Andrew Vertigan

8 September 2012
15:00

(BP) Hull Ionians	27 - 22	Hull (BP)
	Report

Brantingham Park
Attendance: 450
Referee: David Procter

8 September 2012
15:00

Leicester Lions	3 - 45	Birmingham & Solihull (BP)
	Report

Westleigh Park
Attendance: 120
Referee: Guy Steel Bodger

8 September 2012
15:00

(BP) Luctonians	31 - 17	Bromsgrove
	Report

Mortimer Park
Attendance: 314
Referee: Luke Haskins

8 September 2012
15:00

(BP) Otley	45 - 27	Huddersfield (BP)
	Report

Cross Green
Attendance: 417
Referee: Mark Liddell

8 September 2012
15:00

Sheffield Tigers	23 - 20	Preston Grasshoppers (BP)
	Report

Dore Moor
Attendance: 150
Referee: Graham Dickens

8 September 2012
15:00

(BP) Stourbridge	44 - 10	Dudley Kingswinford
	Report

Stourton Park
Attendance: 1,200
Referee: Michael Tutty

=== Round 3 ===
15 September 2012
14:00

Birmingham & Solihull	12 - 32	Darlington Mowden Park (BP)
	Report

Portway
Attendance: 209
Referee: Phil Watters

15 September 2012
14:00

(2BP) Stockport	33 - 39	Otley (BP)
	Report

The Memorial Ground
Attendance: 146
Referee: Andrew Vertigan

15 September 2012
14:00

(BP) Westoe	18 - 23	Sheffield Tigers
	Report

Wood Terrace
Attendance: 146
Referee: Will Halford

15 September 2012
14:30

(BP) Preston Grasshoppers	19 - 21	Hull Ionians
	Report

Lightfoot Green
Attendance: 304
Referee: Brendan Fitzmaurice

15 September 2012
15:00

(BP) Bromsgrove	39 - 23	Caldy
	Report

Finstall Park
Attendance: 205
Referee: Craig Maxwell Keys

15 September 2012
15:00

(BP) Dudley Kingswinford	32 - 29	Leicester Lions (BP)
	Report

Heathbrook
Attendance: 320
Referee: Rob Warburton

15 September 2012
15:00

Huddersfield	7 - 33	Stourbridge (BP)
	Report

Lockwood Park
Attendance: 203
Referee: D Edmunds

15 September 2012
15:00

(BP) Hull	23 - 26	Luctonians (BP)
	Report

Ferens Ground
Attendance: 148
Referee: Matthew Daubney

=== Round 4 ===
22 September 2012
14:00

(BP) Leicester Lions	39 - 23	Huddersfield
	Report

Westleigh Park
Attendance: 100
Referee: Rowan Kitt

22 September 2012
14:30

(BP) Preston Grasshoppers	55 - 12	Hull
	Report

Lightfoot Green
Attendance: 287
Referee: Mark Liddell

22 September 2012
15:00

Caldy	23 - 10	Luctonians
	Report

Paton Field
Attendance: 213
Referee: Matthew Daubney

22 September 2012
15:00

(BP) Darlington Mowden Park	41 - 21	Dudley Kingswinford
	Report

Yiewsley Drive
Attendance: 305
Referee: Wayne Falla

22 September 2012
15:00

(BP) Hull Ionians	31 - 15	Westoe
	Report

Brantingham Park
Attendance: 200
Referee: David Procter

22 September 2012
15:00

Otley	24 - 18	Bromsgrove (BP)
	Report

Cross Green
Attendance: 320
Referee: Will Halford

22 September 2012
15:00

Sheffield Tigers	23 - 17	Birmingham & Solihull (BP)
	Report

Dore Moor
Attendance: 150
Referee: Andrew Vertigan

22 September 2012
15:00

(BP) Stourbridge	65 - 24	Stockport
	Report

Stourton Park
Attendance: 500
Referee: James Sullivan

=== Round 5 ===
29 September 2012
14:00

Birmingham & Solihull	9 - 20	Hull Ionians
	Report

Portway
Attendance: 223
Referee: Rob Warburton

29 September 2012
14:00

Stockport	8 - 24	Leicester Lions (BP)
	Report

The Memorial Ground
Attendance: 123
Referee: Andy Rawson

29 September 2012
14:00

Westoe	17 - 47	Preston Grasshoppers (BP)
	Report

Wood Terrace
Attendance: 180
Referee: Matthew Daubney

29 September 2012
15:00

Bromsgrove	15 - 47	Stourbridge (BP)
	Report

Finstall Park
Attendance: 575
Referee: David Procter

29 September 2012
15:00

(BP) Dudley Kingswinford	19 - 21	Sheffield Tigers
	Report

Heathbrook
Attendance: 430
Referee: Rowan Kitt

29 September 2012
15:00

Huddersfield	27 - 42	Darlington Mowden Park (BP)
	Report

Lockwood Park
Attendance: 191
Referee: Brendan Fitzmaurice

29 September 2012
15:00

(2BP) Hull	28 - 32	Caldy
	Report

Ferens Ground
Attendance: 170
Referee: Karl Kirkpatrick

29 September 2012
15:00

(BP) Luctonians	43 - 18	Otley
	Report

Mortimer Park
Attendance: 517
Referee: Luke Haskins

=== Round 6 ===
6 October 2012
14:00

(BP) Leicester Lions	29 - 28	Bromsgrove (BP)
	Report

Westleigh Park
Attendance: 129
Referee: Phil Watters

6 October 2012
14:00

(BP) Westoe	19 - 25	Hull (BP)
	Report

Wood Terrace
Attendance: 117
Referee: Brendan Fitzmaurice

6 October 2012
14:30

(BP) Preston Grasshoppers	29 - 13	Birmingham & Solihull
	Report

Lightfoot Green
Attendance: 304
Referee: Karl Kirkpatrick

6 October 2012
15:00

(BP) Darlington Mowden Park	36 - 17	Stockport
	Report

Yiewsley Drive
Attendance: 264
Referee: Brendan McGaffney

6 October 2012
15:00

(BP) Hull Ionians	41 - 15	Dudley Kingswinford
	Report

Brantingham Park
Attendance: 250
Referee: Mark Liddell

6 October 2012
15:00

(BP) Otley	32 - 20	Caldy
	Report

Cross Green
Attendance: 369
Referee: Andrew Taylorson

6 October 2012
15:00

(BP) Stourbridge	43 - 7	Luctonians
	Report

Stourton Park
Attendance: 800
Referee: Craig Maxwell Keys

6 October 2012
15:00

(BP) Sheffield Tigers	58 - 30	Huddersfield
	Report

Dore Moor
Attendance: 150
Referee: Will Halford

=== Round 7 ===
13 October 2012
14:00

Birmingham & Solihull	21 - 8	Westoe
	Report

Portway
Attendance: 214

13 October 2012
14:00

(BP) Bromsgrove	5 - 11	Darlington Mowden Park
	Report

Finstall Park
Attendance: 200
Referee: Lloyd Linton

13 October 2012
14:00

(BP) Stockport	18 - 20	Sheffield Tigers
	Report

The Memorial Ground
Attendance: 132
Referee: D Edmunds

13 October 2012
15:00

Caldy	13 - 28	Stourbridge (BP)
	Report

Paton Field
Attendance: 221
Referee: Andy Rawson

13 October 2012
15:00

(BP) Dudley Kingswinford	13 - 18	Preston Grasshoppers
	Report

Heathbrook
Attendance: 600
Referee: Gareth Holsgrove

13 October 2012
15:00

Huddersfield	8 - 38	Hull Ionians (BP)
	Report

Lockwood Park
Attendance: 307
Referee: Will Halford

13 October 2012
15:00

Hull	32 - 30	Otley (2BP)
	Report

Ferens Ground
Attendance: 195
Referee: Andrew Vertigan

13 October 2012
15:00

(BP) Luctonians	31 - 8	Leicester Lions
	Report

Mortimer Park
Attendance: 273
Referee: Rowan Kitt

=== Round 8 ===
20 October 2012
14:00

(BP) Birmingham & Solihull	34 - 16	Hull
	Report

Portway
Attendance: 220
Referee: Rowan Kitt

20 October 2012
14:00

(BP) Leicester Lions	39 - 13	Caldy
	Report

Westleigh Park
Attendance: 134
Referee: Craig Maxwell Keys

20 October 2012
14:00

(BP) Westoe	34 - 32	Dudley Kingswinford (2BP)
	Report

Wood Terrace
Attendance: 230
Referee: Andrew Vertigan

20 October 2012
14:30

(BP) Preston Grasshoppers	56 - 13	Huddersfield
	Report

Lightfoot Green
Attendance: 328
Referee: Andy Rawson

20 October 2012
15:00

(BP) Darlington Mowden Park	34 - 18	Luctonians
	Report

Yiewsley Drive
Attendance: 242
Referee: Brendan Fitzmaurice

20 October 2012
15:00

(BP) Hull Ionians	42 - 15	Stockport
	Report

Brantingham Park
Attendance: 280
Referee: Matthew Daubney

20 October 2012
15:00

(BP) Sheffield Tigers	42 - 41	Bromsgrove (2BP)
	Report

Dore Moor
Attendance: 170

20 October 2012
15:00

(BP) Stourbridge	68 - 10	Otley
	Report

Stourton Park
Attendance: 550
Referee: Rob Warburton

=== Round 9 ===
27 October 2012
14:00

(2BP) Stockport	47 - 48	Preston Grasshoppers (BP)
	Report

The Memorial Ground
Attendance: 159
Referee: Luke Haskins

27 October 2012
15:00

Bromsgrove	10 - 22	Hull Ionians
	Report

Finstall Park
Attendance: 320
Referee: Graham Dickens

27 October 2012
15:00

(BP) Dudley Kingswinford	33 - 17	Birmingham & Solihull
	Report

Heathbrook
Attendance: 358
Referee: David Procter

27 October 2012
15:00

(BP) Caldy	21 - 27	Darlington Mowden Park
	Report

Paton Field
Attendance: 310
Referee: Guy Steel Bodger

27 October 2012
15:00

(2BP) Huddersfield	30 - 32	Westoe (BP)
	Report

Lockwood Park
Attendance: 207
Referee: Clare Daniels

27 October 2012
15:00

Hull	22 - 36	Stourbridge (BP)
	Report

Ferens Ground
Attendance: 263
Referee: Karl Kirkpatrick

27 October 2012
15:00

(2BP) Luctonians	27 - 32	Sheffield Tigers (BP)
	Report

Mortimer Park
Attendance: 279
Referee: John Healy

27 October 2012
15:00

(2BP) Otley	23 - 27	Leicester Lions (BP)
	Report

Cross Green
Attendance: 273
Referee: Will Halford

=== Round 10 ===
3 November 2012
14:00

Birmingham & Solihull	25 - 10	Huddersfield
	Report

Portway
Attendance: 139
Referee: James Sullivan

3 November 2012
14:00

(BP) Hull Ionians	28 - 10	Luctonians
	Report

Brantingham Park
Attendance: 280
Referee: Brendan Fitzmaurice

3 November 2012
14:00

Leicester Lions	12 - 31	Stourbridge (BP)
	Report

Westleigh Park
Attendance: 184
Referee: Mike Cooper

3 November 2012
14:00

(BP) Sheffield Tigers	25 - 19	Caldy (BP)
	Report

Dore Moor
Attendance: 139
Referee: Mark Liddell

3 November 2012
14:00

Westoe	19 - 18	Stockport (BP)
	Report

Wood Terrace
Attendance: 169
Referee: Will Halford

3 November 2012
14:15

(BP) Darlington Mowden Park	40 - 22	Otley (BP)
	Report

Yiewsley Drive
Attendance: 325
Referee: Graham Dickens

3 November 2012
14:15

Dudley Kingswinford	15 - 13	Hull (BP)
	Report

Heathbrook
Attendance: 320
Referee: Dave Clarkson

3 November 2012
14:30

(BP) Preston Grasshoppers	29 - 26	Bromsgrove (BP)
	Report

Lightfoot Green
Attendance: 335
Referee: Guy Steel Bodger

=== Round 11 ===
10 November 2012
14:00

Bromsgrove	28 - 10	Westoe
	Report

Finstall Park
Attendance: 200

10 November 2012
14:00

(BP) Hull	27 - 13	Leicester Lions
	Report

Ferens Ground
Attendance: 165

10 November 2012
14:00

(BP) Stockport	17 - 21	Birmingham & Solihull
	Report

The Memorial Ground
Attendance: 145
Referee: Andy Rawson

10 November 2012
14:15

Caldy	27 - 22	Hull Ionians (BP)
	Report

Paton Field
Attendance: 201
Referee: Andrew Vertigan

10 November 2012
14:15

Luctonians	20 - 20	Preston Grasshoppers
	Report

Mortimer Park
Attendance: 235
Referee: D Edmunds

10 November 2012
14:15

(BP) Otley	29 - 23	Sheffield Tigers (BP)
	Report

Cross Green
Attendance: 341
Referee: Luke Haskins

10 November 2012
15:00

Huddersfield	13 - 13	Dudley Kingswinford
	Report

Lockwood Park
Attendance: 186
Referee: Matthew Daubney

10 November 2012
15:00

(BP) Stourbridge	33 - 18	Darlington Mowden Park
	Report

Stourton Park
Attendance: 500
Referee: Michael Tutty

=== Round 12 ===
17 November 2012
14:00

Birmingham & Solihull	18 - 18	Bromsgrove
	Report

Portway
Attendance: 225
Referee: David Procter

17 November 2012
14:00

(BP) Hull Ionians	31 - 22	Otley (BP)
	Report

Brantingham Park
Attendance: 280
Referee: Craig Maxwell Keys

17 November 2012
14:00

(BP) Sheffield Tigers	20 - 22	Stourbridge (BP)
	Report

Dore Moor
Attendance: 205
Referee: Fergus Kirby

17 November 2012
14:00

Westoe	17 - 13	Luctonians (BP)
	Report

Wood Terrace
Attendance: 198
Referee: Matthew Daubney

17 November 2012
14:15

(BP) Darlington Mowden Park	29 - 6	Leicester Lions
	Report

Yiewsley Drive
Attendance: 265
Referee: Will Halford

17 November 2012
14:15

(BP) Dudley Kingswinford	39 - 15	Stockport
	Report

Heathbrook
Attendance: 280
Referee: Andrew Vertigan

17 November 2012
14:30

(BP) Preston Grasshoppers	31 - 22	Caldy
	Report

Lightfoot Green
Attendance: 306
Referee: Andy Rawson

17 November 2012
15:00

(BP) Huddersfield	26 - 21	Hull (BP)
	Report

Lockwood Park
Attendance: 150
Referee: Graham Dickens

=== Round 13 ===
24 November 2012
14:00

Hull	15 - 13	Darlington Mowden Park (BP)
	Report

Ferens Ground
Attendance: 125
Referee: Mark Liddell

24 November 2012
14:00

Stockport	28 - 20	Huddersfield
	Report

The Memorial Ground
Attendance: 143
Referee: Brendan McGaffney

24 November 2012
14:15

(BP) Bromsgrove	25 - 3	Dudley Kingswinford
	Report

Finstall Park
Attendance: 250
Referee: Tom Davis

24 November 2012
14:15

(BP) Caldy	66 - 14	Westoe
	Report

Paton Field
Attendance: 220
Referee: D Edmunds

24 November 2012
14:15

(BP) Luctonians	39 - 5	Birmingham & Solihull
	Report

Mortimer Park
Attendance: 257
Referee: Andrew Vertigan

24 November 2012
14:15

Otley	22 - 20	Preston Grasshoppers (BP)
	Report

Cross Green
Attendance: 379
Referee: Brendan Fitzmaurice

24 November 2012
15:00

(BP) Stourbridge	27 - 15	Hull Ionians
	Report

Stourton Park
Attendance: 500
Referee: Philip Davis

24 November 2012

Leicester Lions	P - P	Sheffield Tigers

- Postponed. Game rescheduled to 1 December 2012.

=== Round 13 (rescheduled game) ===
1 December 2012
14:00

(BP) Leicester Lions	37 - 10	Sheffield Tigers
	Report

Westleigh Park
Attendance: 100

- Game rescheduled from 24 November 2012.

=== Round 14 ===
8 December 2012
14:00

(BP) Birmingham & Solihull	13 - 17	Caldy
	Report

Portway
Attendance: 122
Referee: Clare Daniels

8 December 2012
14:00

(BP) Dudley Kingswinford	32 - 27	Luctonians (2BP)
	Report

Heathbrook
Attendance: 280
Referee: Guy Steel Bodger

8 December 2012
14:00

(BP) Hull Ionians	38 - 20	Leicester Lions
	Report

Brantingham Park
Attendance: 150
Referee: D Edmunds

8 December 2012
14:00

Sheffield Tigers	12 - 31	Darlington Mowden Park (BP)
	Report

Dore Moor
Attendance: 137
Referee: Andy Rawson

8 December 2012
14:00

Stockport	24 - 49	Hull (BP)
	Report

The Memorial Ground
Attendance: 132
Referee: Graham Dickens

8 December 2012
14:00

(BP) Westoe	19 - 20	Otley
	Report

Wood Terrace
Attendance: 181
Referee: Graham Well

8 December 2012
14:30

(BP) Preston Grasshoppers	23 - 35	Stourbridge (BP)
	Report

Lightfoot Green
Attendance: 423
Referee: Andrew Vertigan

8 December 2012
15:00

(BP) Huddersfield	12 - 14	Bromsgrove
	Report

Lockwood Park
Attendance: 182
Referee: Brendan McGaffney

=== Round 15 ===
15 December 2012
14:00

(BP) Hull	40 - 31	Sheffield Tigers (BP)
	Report

Ferens Ground
Attendance: 160
Referee: Andrew Vertigan

15 December 2012
14:00

Leicester Lions	10 - 9	Preston Grasshoppers (BP)
	Report

Westleigh Park
Attendance: 120
Referee: Brendan Fitzmaurice

15 December 2012
14:00

(BP) Otley	51 - 15	Birmingham & Solihull
	Report

Cross Green
Attendance: 243
Referee: Matthew Daubney

15 December 2012
14:15

Bromsgrove	22 - 17	Stockport (BP)
	Report

Finstall Park
Attendance: 350
Referee: Rowan Kitt

15 December 2012
14:15

(BP) Caldy	37 - 6	Dudley Kingswinford
	Report

Paton Field
Attendance: 216
Referee: Karl Kirkpatrick

15 December 2012
14:15

Luctonians	12 - 21	Huddersfield
	Report

Mortimer Park
Attendance: 211
Referee: Mark Liddell

15 December 2012
15:00

(BP) Stourbridge	52 - 5	Westoe
	Report

Stourton Park
Attendance: 375
Referee: Luke Haskins

15 December 2012

Darlington Mowden Park	P - P	Hull Ionians

- Postponed. Game rescheduled to 9 February 2013.

=== Round 16 ===
22 December 2012
14:00

Dudley Kingswinford	7 - 29	Stourbridge (BP)
	Report

Heathbrook
Attendance: 1,200
Referee: Nick Cockburn

22 December 2012
14:00

Hull	5 - 28	Hull Ionians
	Report

Ferens Ground
Attendance: 310
Referee: Marcus Caton

22 December 2012
14:00

Westoe	5 - 20	Darlington Mowden Park
	Report

Wood Terrace
Attendance: 90
Referee: Wayne Falla

22 December 2012
15:00

(BP) Huddersfield	15 - 20	Otley
	Report

Lockwood Park
Attendance: 222
Referee: Andrew Vertigan

22 December 2012

Birmingham & Solihull	P - P	Leicester Lions

- Postponed. Game rescheduled to 9 February 2013.

22 December 2012

Bromsgrove	P - P	Luctonians

- Postponed. Game rescheduled to 9 February 2013.

22 December 2012

Preston Grasshoppers	P - P	Sheffield Tigers

- Postponed. Game rescheduled to 9 February 2013.

22 December 2012

Stockport	P - P	Caldy

- Postponed. Game rescheduled to 9 February 2013.

=== Round 17 ===
5 January 2013
14:00

(BP) Hull Ionians	33 - 20	Preston Grasshoppers
	Report

Brantingham Park
Attendance: 260
Referee: Tom Davis

5 January 2013
14:00

(BP) Leicester Lions	37 - 17	Dudley Kingswinford
	Report

Westleigh Park
Attendance: 170
Referee: Brendan McGaffney

5 January 2013
14:00

(BP) Sheffield Tigers	36 - 13	Westoe
	Report

Dore Moor
Attendance: 121
Referee: Will Halford

5 January 2013
14:00

(BP) Stourbridge	40 - 0	Huddersfield
	Report

Stourton Park
Attendance: 500
Referee: Mike Cooper

5 January 2013
14:15

Caldy	21 - 10	Bromsgrove
	Report

Paton Field
Attendance: 226
Referee: Andy Rawson

5 January 2013
14:15

(BP) Darlington Mowden Park	40 - 10	Birmingham & Solihull
	Report

Yiewsley Drive (Note: This was Darlington Mowden Park's last game at Yiewsley Drive prior to moving to the Northern Echo Arena.)
Attendance: 345
Referee: Andrew Vertigan

5 January 2013
14:15

(BP) Luctonians	48 - 32	Hull (BP)
	Report

Mortimer Park
Attendance: 326
Referee: David Procter

5 January 2013
14:15

(BP) Otley	32 - 22	Stockport (BP)
	Report

Cross Green
Attendance: 416

=== Round 18 ===
12 January 2013
14:00

Birmingham & Solihull	19 - 0	Sheffield Tigers
	Report

Portway
Attendance: 176
Referee: Douglas Neagle

12 January 2013
14:00

(2BP) Hull	31 - 36	Preston Grasshoppers (BP)
	Report

Ferens Ground
Attendance: 135
Referee: Mark Liddell

12 January 2013
14:00

Stockport	5 - 45	Stourbridge (BP)
	Report

The Memorial Ground
Attendance: 135
Referee: D Edmunds

12 January 2013
14:00

Westoe	8 - 33	Hull Ionians (BP)
	Report

Wood Terrace
Attendance: 195
Referee: Brendan Fitzmaurice

12 January 2013
14:15

Bromsgrove	24 - 24	Otley (BP)
	Report

Finstall Park
Attendance: 200
Referee: Graham Dickens

12 January 2013
14:15

Dudley Kingswinford	18 - 15	Darlington Mowden Park (BP)
	Report

Heathbrook
Attendance: 250
Referee: Luke Haskins

12 January 2013
14:15

(BP) Luctonians	29 - 10	Caldy
	Report

Mortimer Park
Attendance: 347
Referee: Rowan Kitt

12 January 2013
15:00

(BP) Huddersfield	11 - 14	Leicester Lions
	Report

Lockwood Park
Attendance: 207
Referee: Matthew Daubney

=== Round 19 ===
19 January 2013
15:00

Stourbridge	12 - 21	Bromsgrove
	Report

Stourton Park
Attendance: 400
Referee: Rowan Kitt

19 January 2013

Caldy	P - P	Hull

- Postponed. Game rescheduled to 23 February 2013.

19 January 2013

Darlington Mowden Park	P - P	Huddersfield

- Postponed. Game rescheduled to 23 February 2013.

19 January 2013

Hull Ionians	P - P	Birmingham & Solihull

- Postponed. Game rescheduled to 23 February 2013.

19 January 2013

Leicester Lions	P - P	Stockport

- Postponed. Game rescheduled to 23 February 2013.

19 January 2013

Otley	P - P	Luctonians

- Postponed. Game rescheduled to 23 February 2013.

19 January 2013

Preston Grasshoppers	P - P	Westoe

- Postponed. Game rescheduled to 4 May 2013.

19 January 2013

Sheffield Tigers	P - P	Dudley Kingswinford

- Postponed. Game rescheduled to 4 May 2013.

=== Round 20 ===
26 January 2013
14:15

Bromsgrove	3 - 30	Leicester Lions
	Report

Finstall Park
Attendance: 150
Referee: Dan Shaw

26 January 2013
14:15

Luctonians	5 - 13	Stourbridge
	Report

Mortimer Park
Attendance: 310
Referee: Andy Rawson

26 January 2013

Birmingham & Solihull	P - P	Preston Grasshoppers

- Postponed. Game rescheduled to 16 March 2013.

26 January 2013

Caldy	P - P	Otley

- Postponed. Game rescheduled to 16 March 2013.

26 January 2013

Dudley Kingswinford	P - P	Hull Ionians

- Postponed. Game rescheduled to 16 March 2013.

26 January 2013

Huddersfield	P - P	Sheffield Tigers

- Postponed. Game rescheduled to 16 March 2013.

26 January 2013

Hull	P - P	Westoe

- Postponed. Game rescheduled to 16 March 2013.

26 January 2013

Stockport	P - P	Darlington Mowden Park

- Postponed. Game rescheduled to 16 March 2013.

=== Round 21 ===
2 February 2013
14:00

(BP) Hull Ionians	46 - 7	Huddersfield
	Report

Brantingham Park
Attendance: 220
Referee: Brendan Fitzmaurice

2 February 2013
14:00

(BP) Leicester Lions	34 - 24	Luctonians (BP)
	Report

Westleigh Park
Attendance: 143
Referee: Luke Haskins

2 February 2013
14:00

(BP) Preston Grasshoppers	36 - 7	Dudley Kingswinford
	Report

Lightfoot Green
Attendance: 346
Referee: Karl Kirkpatrick

2 February 2013
14:00

(BP) Sheffield Tigers	42 - 12	Stockport
	Report

Dore Moor
Attendance: 111
Referee: Guy Steel Bodger

2 February 2013
14:00

(2BP) Westoe	31 - 34	Birmingham & Solihull (BP)
	Report

Wood Terrace
Attendance: 102
Referee: Andrew Vertigan

2 February 2013
14:15

(BP) Otley	21 - 26	Hull
	Report

Cross Green
Attendance: 349
Referee: Andy Rawson

2 February 2013
15:00

(BP) Darlington Mowden Park	62 - 7	Bromsgrove
	Report

The Northern Echo Arena (Note: This was Darlington Mowden Park's first game at the Northern Echo Arena.)
Attendance: 1,250
Referee: D Edmunds

2 February 2013
15:00

(BP) Stourbridge	30 - 14	Caldy
	Report

Stourton Park
Attendance: 375
Referee: Tom Davis

=== Rounds 15 & 16 (rescheduled games) ===
9 February 2013
14:00

(BP) Birmingham & Solihull	19 - 25	Leicester Lions
	Report

Portway
Attendance: 147
Referee: Tom Bartram

- Game rescheduled from 22 December 2012.

9 February 2013
14:00

Stockport	29 - 14	Caldy
	Report

The Memorial Ground
Attendance: 130
Referee: Matthew Daubney

- Game rescheduled from 22 December 2012.

9 February 2013
14:15

(BP) Bromsgrove	39 - 15	Luctonians
	Report

Finstall Park
Attendance: 223
Referee: Guy Steel Bodger

- Game rescheduled from 22 December 2012.

9 February 2013
14:15

(2BP) Darlington Mowden Park	27 - 28	Hull Ionians
	Report

The Northern Echo Arena
Attendance: 725
Referee: Andrew Taylorson

- Game rescheduled from 15 December 2012.

9 February 2013
14:30

Preston Grasshoppers	27 - 26	Sheffield Tigers (2BP)
	Report

Lightfoot Green
Attendance: 272
Referee: Mark Liddell

- Game rescheduled from 22 December 2012.

=== Round 22 ===
16 February 2013
14:00

(BP) Hull	24 - 28	Birmingham & Solihull
	Report

Ferens Ground
Attendance: 136
Referee: Alex Manley

16 February 2013
14:00

(BP) Stockport	15 - 20	Hull Ionians
	Report

The Memorial Ground
Attendance: 100
Referee: Graham Dickens

16 February 2013
14:15

(BP) Bromsgrove	27 - 15	Sheffield Tigers
	Report

Finstall Park
Attendance: 250
Referee: Mark Liddell

16 February 2013
14:15

Caldy	12 - 10	Leicester Lions (BP)
	Report

Paton Field
Attendance: 149
Referee: Andrew Vertigan

16 February 2013
14:15

(BP) Dudley Kingswinford	35 - 33	Westoe (2BP)
	Report

Heathbrook
Attendance: 350
Referee: Neil Muir

16 February 2013
14:15

Luctonians	17 - 6	Darlington Mowden Park
	Report

Mortimer Park
Attendance: 410
Referee: Marcus Caton

16 February 2013
14:15

Otley	13 - 12	Stourbridge (BP)
	Report

Cross Green
Attendance: 437
Referee: Will Halford

16 February 2013
15:00

Huddersfield	6 - 47	Preston Grasshoppers (BP)
	Report

Lockwood Park
Attendance: 234
Referee: Matthew Daubney

=== Round 19 (rescheduled games) ===
23 February 2013
14:00

(BP) Darlington Mowden Park	69 - 5	Huddersfield
	Report

The Northern Echo Arena
Attendance: 480
Referee: Stephen Rainey

- Game rescheduled from 19 January 2013.

23 February 2013
14:00

(BP) Hull Ionians	28 - 11	Birmingham & Solihull
	Report

Brantingham Park
Attendance: 260
Referee: D Edmunds

- Game rescheduled from 19 January 2013.

23 February 2013
14:00

Leicester Lions	14 - 28	Stockport (BP)
	Report

Westleigh Park
Attendance: 100
Referee: Mark Liddell

- Game rescheduled from 19 January 2013.

23 February 2013
14:15

(BP) Caldy	42 - 21	Hull
	Report

Paton Field
Attendance: 101
Referee: Matthew O'Grady

- Game rescheduled from 19 January 2013.

23 February 2013
14:15

(BP) Otley	45 - 26	Luctonians
	Report

Cross Green
Attendance: 210
Referee: Andrew Vertigan

- Game rescheduled from 19 January 2013.

=== Round 23 ===
2 March 2013
14:00

Birmingham & Solihull	25 - 22	Dudley Kingswinford (BP)
	Report

Portway
Attendance: 236
Referee: Will Halford

2 March 2013
14:00

(BP) Leicester Lions	43 - 31	Otley (BP)
	Report

Westleigh Park
Attendance: 127
Referee: Rowan Kitt

2 March 2013
14:00

(BP) Westoe	26 - 22	Huddersfield (BP)
	Report

Wood Terrace
Attendance: 135
Referee: Brendan Fitzmaurice

2 March 2013
14:15

(BP) Darlington Mowden Park	29 - 8	Caldy
	Report

The Northern Echo Arena
Attendance: 635
Referee: Andrew Vertigan

2 March 2013
14:30

(BP) Preston Grasshoppers	36 - 10	Stockport
	Report

Lightfoot Green
Attendance: 421
Referee: D Edmunds

2 March 2013
15:00

(BP) Hull Ionians	43 - 0	Bromsgrove
	Report

Brantingham Park
Attendance: 220
Referee: Matthew Daubney

2 March 2013
15:00

(BP) Sheffield Tigers	35 - 20	Luctonians
	Report

Dore Moor
Attendance: 103
Referee: Matthew O'Grady

2 March 2013
15:00

(BP) Stourbridge	48 - 15	Hull
	Report

Stourton Park
Attendance: 650
Referee: Guy Steel Bodger

=== Round 24 ===
9 March 2013
14:00

Stockport	16 - 24	Westoe
	Report

The Memorial Ground
Attendance: 100
Referee: Matthew Daubney

9 March 2013
14:15

Luctonians	14 - 32	Hull Ionians (BP)
	Report

Mortimer Park
Attendance: 290
Referee: D Edmunds

9 March 2013
14:15

Otley	0 - 27	Darlington Mowden Park
	Report

Cross Green
Attendance: 208
Referee: Will Halford

9 March 2013
15:00

Bromsgrove	3 - 12	Preston Grasshoppers
	Report

Finstall Park
Attendance: 180
Referee: Rowan Kitt

9 March 2013
15:00

Caldy	19 - 9	Sheffield Tigers
	Report

Paton Field
Attendance: 142
Referee: Andy Rawson

9 March 2013
15:00

Huddersfield	3 - 53	Birmingham & Solihull (BP)
	Report

Lockwood Park
Attendance: 260
Referee: Gareth Holsgrove

9 March 2013
15:00

(BP) Hull	51 - 9	Dudley Kingswinford
	Report

Ferens Ground
Attendance: 110
Referee: Brendan Fitzmaurice

9 March 2013
15:00

(BP) Stourbridge	41 - 3	Leicester Lions
	Report

Stourton Park
Attendance: 400
Referee: Mark Liddell

=== Round 20 (rescheduled games) ===
16 March 2013
14:00

(BP) Birmingham & Solihull	16 - 19	Preston Grasshoppers
	Report

Portway
Attendance: 144
Referee: Tom Davis

- Game rescheduled from 26 January 2013.

16 March 2013
14:00

(BP) Hull	34 - 30	Westoe (2BP)
	Report

Ferens Ground
Attendance: 105
Referee: Mike Cooper

- Game rescheduled from 26 January 2013.

16 March 2013
14:00

Stockport	14 - 40	Darlington Mowden Park (BP)
	Report

The Memorial Ground
Attendance: 130
Referee: Guy Steel Bodger

- Game rescheduled from 26 January 2013.

16 March 2013
14:15

(BP) Caldy	13 - 15	Otley
	Report

Paton Field
Attendance: 219
Referee: Karl Kirkpatrick

- Game rescheduled from 26 January 2013.

16 March 2013
14:15

(BP) Dudley Kingswinford	19 - 22	Hull Ionians
	Report

Heathbrook
Attendance: 300
Referee: John Healy

- Game rescheduled from 26 January 2013.

16 March 2013
15:00

Huddersfield	20 - 28	Sheffield Tigers (BP)
	Report

Lockwood Park
Attendance: 243
Referee: Will Halford

- Game rescheduled from 26 January 2013.

=== Round 25 ===
23 March 2013
14:00

Westoe	19 - 17	Bromsgrove (BP)
	Report

Wood Terrace
Attendance: 125
Referee: Elia Rizzo

23 March 2013
14:15

Darlington Mowden Park	14 - 9	Stourbridge (BP)
	Report

The Northern Echo Arena
Attendance: 647
Referee: Wayne Falla

23 March 2013

Birmingham & Solihull	P - P	Stockport

- Postponed. Game rescheduled to 4 May 2013.

23 March 2013

Dudley Kingswinford	C - C	Huddersfield

- Game was initially postponed but would ultimately be cancelled due to fixture congestion at the end of the season and the result would not affect the final outcome of the league.

23 March 2013

Hull Ionians	P - P	Caldy

- Postponed. Game rescheduled to 4 May 2013.

23 March 2013

Leicester Lions	C - C	Hull

- Game was initially postponed but would ultimately be cancelled due to fixture congestion at the end of the season and the result would not affect the final outcome of the league.

23 March 2013

Preston Grasshoppers	P - P	Luctonians

- Postponed. Game rescheduled to 11 May 2013.

23 March 2013

Sheffield Tigers	P - P	Otley

- Postponed. Game rescheduled to 8 May 2013.

=== Round 26 ===
30 March 2013
14:00

(BP) Leicester Lions	23 - 28	Darlington Mowden Park
	Report

Westleigh Park
Attendance: 173
Referee: Paul Kimber

30 March 2013
14:00

(BP) Stockport	34 - 27	Dudley Kingswinford (2BP)
	Report

The Memorial Ground
Attendance: 128
Referee: D Edmunds

30 March 2013
14:15

(BP) Luctonians	36 - 12	Westoe
	Report

Mortimer Park
Attendance: 270
Referee: Nick Williams

30 March 2013
15:00

Bromsgrove	22 - 20	Birmingham & Solihull (BP)
	Report

Finstall Park
Attendance: 275
Referee: Alex Manley

30 March 2013
15:00

(BP) Caldy	30 - 23	Preston Grasshoppers (BP)
	Report

Paton Field
Attendance: 261
Referee: Luke Haskins

30 March 2013
15:00

(2BP) Otley	26 - 33	Hull Ionians (BP)
	Report

Cross Green
Attendance: 368
Referee: Andrew Vertigan

30 March 2013
15:00

(BP) Stourbridge	39 - 9	Sheffield Tigers
	Report

Stourton Park
Attendance: 500
Referee: Mike Cooper

30 March 2013

Hull	P - P	Huddersfield

- Postponed. Game rescheduled to 4 May 2013.

=== Round 27 ===
6 April 2013
14:00

(BP) Birmingham & Solihull	21 - 22	Luctonians
	Report

Portway
Attendance: 223
Referee: Richard Harding

6 April 2013
14:00

(BP) Dudley Kingswinford	30 - 32	Bromsgrove
	Report

Heathbrook
Attendance: 365
Referee: Andrew Vertigan

6 April 2013
14:00

(BP) Hull Ionians	24 - 23	Stourbridge (BP)
	Report

Brantingham Park
Attendance: 480
Referee: Wayne Falla

6 April 2013
14:00

(BP) Westoe	39 - 38	Caldy (2BP)
	Report

Wood Terrace
Attendance: 156
Referee: Matthew Daubney

6 April 2013
14:15

(BP) Darlington Mowden Park	32 - 13	Hull
	Report

The Northern Echo Arena
Attendance: 670
Referee: Mark Liddell

6 April 2013
14:30

(BP) Preston Grasshoppers	43 - 35	Otley (BP)
	Report

Lightfoot Green
Attendance: 393
Referee: Karl Kirkpatrick

6 April 2013
15:00

Huddersfield	13 - 31	Stockport (BP)
	Report

Lockwood Park
Attendance: 200
Referee: Guy Steel Bodger

6 April 2013
15:00

Sheffield Tigers	15 - 10	Leicester Lions (BP)
	Report

Dore Moor
Attendance: 124
Referee: Jamie Leahy

=== Round 28 ===
13 April 2013
14:00

(BP) Caldy	30 - 36	Birmingham & Solihull (BP)
	Report

Paton Field
Attendance: 273
Referee: Guy Steel Bodger

13 April 2013
14:00

(BP) Leicester Lions	11 - 17	Hull Ionians
	Report

Westleigh Park
Attendance: 117
Referee: Rowan Kitt

13 April 2013
14:15

(2BP) Darlington Mowden Park	28 - 31	Sheffield Tigers (BP)
	Report

The Northern Echo Arena
Attendance: 710
Referee: Andy Rawson

13 April 2013
15:00

(BP) Bromsgrove	43 - 5	Huddersfield
	Report

Finstall Park
Attendance: 120
Referee: Luke Haskins

13 April 2013
15:00

(BP) Hull	37 - 25	Stockport (BP)
	Report

Ferens Ground
Attendance: 182
Referee: Clare Hodnett

13 April 2013
15:00

(BP) Luctonians	12 - 14	Dudley Kingswinford
	Report

Mortimer Park
Attendance: 367
Referee: D Edmunds

13 April 2013
15:00

(BP) Otley	33 - 24	Westoe (BP)
	Report

Cross Green
Attendance: 216
Referee: Will Halford

13 April 2013
15:00

(BP) Stourbridge	32 - 22	Preston Grasshoppers
	Report

Stourton Park
Attendance: 550
Referee: Rob Warburton

=== Round 29 ===
20 April 2013
14:00

(2BP) Birmingham & Solihull	24 - 29	Otley (BP)
	Report

Portway
Attendance: 221
Referee: Max Marsden

20 April 2013
14:00

Stockport	22 - 19	Bromsgrove (BP)
	Report

The Memorial Ground
Attendance: 141
Referee: Brendan McGaffney

20 April 2013
14:00

Westoe	0 - 53	Stourbridge (BP)
	Report

Wood Terrace
Attendance: 123
Referee: Andy Rawson

20 April 2013
15:00

(BP) Dudley Kingswinford	26 - 26	Caldy
	Report

Heathbrook
Attendance: 300

20 April 2013
14:30

(BP) Preston Grasshoppers	83 - 19	Leicester Lions
	Report

Lightfoot Green
Attendance: 547
Referee: Brendan Fitzmaurice

20 April 2013
15:00

(BP) Hull Ionians	32 - 31	Darlington Mowden Park (2BP)
	Report

Brantingham Park
Attendance: 280
Referee: Will Halford

20 April 2013
15:00

Huddersfield	5 - 64	Luctonians (BP)
	Report

Lockwood Park
Attendance: 150
Referee: Matthew Daubney

20 April 2013
15:00

Sheffield Tigers	15 - 32	Hull (BP)
	Report

Dore Moor
Attendance: 120
Referee: D Edmunds

=== Round 30 ===
27 April 2013
14:00

(BP) Westoe	52 - 24	Leicester Lions (BP)
	Report

Wood Terrace
Attendance: 130
Referee: Will Halford

27 April 2013
15:00

(BP) Bromsgrove	27 - 40	Hull (BP)
	Report

Finstall Park
Attendance: 250
Referee: Mark Liddell

27 April 2013
15:00

(BP) Caldy	57 - 19	Huddersfield
	Report

Paton Field
Attendance: 371
Referee: D Edmunds

27 April 2013
15:00

(BP) Darlington Mowden Park	54 - 24	Preston Grasshoppers (BP)
	Report

The Northern Echo Arena
Attendance: 1,125
Referee: Matthew Daubney

27 April 2013
15:00

(BP) Luctonians	42 - 21	Stockport
	Report

Mortimer Park
Attendance: 472
Referee: David Procter

27 April 2013
15:00

(BP) Otley	59 - 31	Dudley Kingswinford (BP)
	Report

Cross Green
Attendance: 285
Referee: Brendan Fitzmaurice

27 April 2013
15:00

Sheffield Tigers	21 - 41	Hull Ionians (BP)
	Report

Dore Moor
Attendance: 210
Referee: Marcus Caton

27 April 2013
15:00

(BP) Stourbridge	31 - 12	Birmingham & Solihull
	Report

Stourton Park
Attendance: 850
Referee: Tom Foley

=== Rounds 19, 25 & 26 (rescheduled games) ===
4 May 2013
15:00

(BP) Birmingham & Solihull	46 - 14	Stockport
	Report

Portway
Attendance: 220
Referee: Clare Hodnett

- Game rescheduled from 23 March 2013.

4 May 2013
15:00

(BP) Hull	53 - 10	Huddersfield
	Report

Ferens Ground
Attendance: 105
Referee: Jamie Leahy

- Game rescheduled from 30 March 2013.

4 May 2013
15:00

(BP) Hull Ionians	50 - 7	Caldy
	Report

Brantingham Park
Attendance: 450
Referee: Andrew Taylorson

- Game rescheduled from 23 March 2013.

4 May 2013
15:00

(BP) Preston Grasshoppers	67 - 31	Westoe (BP)
	Report

Lightfoot Green
Attendance: 257
Referee: Graham Dickens

- Game rescheduled from 19 January 2013.

4 May 2013
15:00

(BP) Sheffield Tigers	32 - 26	Dudley Kingswinford
	Report

Dore Moor
Attendance: 127
Referee: Brendan Fitzmaurice

- Game rescheduled from 19 January 2013.

=== Round 25 (rescheduled game) ===
8 May 2013
18:30

(BP) Sheffield Tigers	52 - 21	Otley
	Report

Dore Moor
Attendance: 111
Referee: Andrew Vertigan

- Game rescheduled from 23 March 2013.

=== Round 25 (rescheduled game) ===
11 May 2013
15:00

(BP) Preston Grasshoppers	57 - 21	Luctonians
	Report

Lightfoot Green
Attendance: 233
Referee: Andy Rawson

- Game rescheduled from 23 March 2013.

=== Promotion play-off ===
Each season, the runners–up in the National League 2 South and National League 2 North participate in a play–off for promotion into National League 1. Stourbridge as runners-up in the north had the better league record than southern counterparts Worthing Raiders and would host the game.

11 May 2013
15:00

Stourbridge	26 – 28	Worthing Raiders
	Stourbridge; Worthing Raiders

Stourton Park
Attendance: 925
Referee: Nick Cockburn

== Total season attendances ==
- Figures not including north-south promotion playoff.

Club	Home Games	Total	Average	Highest	Lowest	% Capacity
Birmingham & Solihull	15	3,361	224	534	122	
Bromsgrove	15	3,748	250	575	120	
Caldy	15	3,424	228	371	101	6%
Darlington Mowden Park	15	8,343	556	1,250	242	3%
Dudley Kingswinford	14 (Note: Dudley Kingswinford only played 14 home games as a game was cancelled due to fixture congestion.)	5,783	413	1,200	250	16%
Huddersfield	15	3,173	212	307	150	14%
Hull	15	2,469	165	310	105	11%
Hull Ionians	15	4,310	287	480	150	19%
Leicester Lions	14 (Note: Leicester Lions only played 14 home games as a game was cancelled due to fixture congestion.)	1,817	130	184	100	6%
Luctonians	15	4,878	325	517	211	15%
Otley	15	4,831	322	437	208	5%
Preston Grasshoppers	15	5,158	344	547	233	15%
Sheffield Tigers	15	2,128	142	210	103	14%
Stockport	15	1,976	132	159	100	26%
Stourbridge	15	8,650	577	1,200	375	16%
Westoe	15	2,277	152	230	90	

== Individual statistics ==
- Note that points scorers includes tries as well as conversions, penalties and drop goals.

=== Top points scorers ===
Rank	Player	Team	Appearances	Points
1	(England) Sean Taylor	Preston Grasshoppers	28	341
2	(England) Richard Vasey	Caldy	27	289
3	(England) Grant Cannon	Darlington Mowden Park	26	257
4	(England) Tom Outram	Sheffield Tigers	28	243
5	(England) Gregory Lound	Hull	24	227
6	(England) James Hearn	Stourbridge	26	223
7	(England) Jack Jolly	Birmingham & Solihull	29	211
8	(England) Jon Boden	Leicester Lions	24	189
9	(England) Gareth Brown	Dudley Kingswinford	24	188
10	(England) Christopher Reakes	Hull Ionians	22	177

=== Top try scorers ===
Rank	Player	Team	Appearances	Tries
1	(England) James Twomey	Otley	30	28
2	(England) Chris McTurk	Darlington Mowden Park	24	26
2	(England) Jamie Broadley	Sheffield Tigers	28	26
3	(England) Drew Cheshire	Luctonians	28	25
4	(England) Sean Taylor	Preston Grasshoppers	28	21
5	(Wales) Gavin Roberts	Caldy	27	20
5	(England) Peter Swatkins	Sheffield Tigers	30	20
6	(England) Adam Birchall	Preston Grasshoppers	22	19
6	(England) Kerry Wood	Hull Ionians	29	19
7	(England) James Wigglesworth	Hull	19	18
7	(England) Drew Harper	Stourbridge	24	18

== Season records ==
=== Team ===
Largest home win — 64 pts (x2)

69 - 5 Darlington Mowden Park at home to Huddersfield on 23 February 2013
83 - 19 Preston Grasshoppers at home to Leicester Lions on 20 April 2013

Largest away win — 59 pts

64 - 5 Luctonians away to Huddersfield on 20 April 2013

Most points scored — 83 pts

83 - 19 Preston Grasshoppers at home to Leicester Lions on 20 April 2013

Most tries in a match — 13

Preston Grasshoppers at home to Leicester Lions on 20 April 2013

Most conversions in a match — 9

Preston Grasshoppers at home to Leicester Lions on 20 April 2013

Most penalties in a match — 6 (x3)

Darlington Mowden Park away to Birmingham & Solihull on 15 September 2012
Hull at home to Otley on 13 October 2012
Birmingham & Solihull at home to Bromsgrove on 17 November 2012

Most drop goals in a match — 1

N/A - multiple times

=== Player ===
Most points in a match — 33

(England) Sean Taylor for Preston Grasshoppers at home to Leicester Lions on 20 April 2013

Most tries in a match — 4 (x3)

(England) Shaun McCartney for Darlington Mowden Park at home to Bromsgrove on 2 February 2013
(England) James Twomey for Otley at home to Dudley Kingswinford on 27 April 2013
(England) Adam Birchall for Preston Grasshoppers at home to Luctonians on 11 May 2013

Most conversions in a match — 9

(England) Sean Taylor for Preston Grasshoppers at home to Leicester Lions on 20 April 2013

Most penalties in a match — 6 (x2)

(England) Gregory Lound for Hull at home to Otley on 13 October 2012
(England) Jack Jolly for Birmingham & Solihull at home to Bromsgrove on 17 November 2012

Most drop goals in a match — 1

N/A - multiple players

=== Attendances ===
Highest — 1,250

Darlington Mowden Park at home to Bromsgrove on 2 February 2013

Lowest — 90

Westoe at home to Darlington Mowden Park on 22 December 2012

Highest Average Attendance — 577

Stourbridge

Lowest Average Attendance — 130

Leicester Lions

== See also ==
- English Rugby Union Leagues
- English rugby union system
- Rugby union in England
