= Bethesda RFC =

(Wales) Bethesda RFC
- Full name: Bethesda Rugby Football Club
- Location: Bethesda; Wales
- Chairman: Cemlyn Jones
- President: Robert Eifion Davies
- League: WRU Division One North
- 2011-12: 4th
Team kit

Official website
- www.rygbipesda.com

Bethesda Rugby Football Club (Welsh: Clwb Rygbi Bethesda) is a Welsh rugby union team based in Bethesda, North Wales. Bethesda is a member of the Welsh Rugby Union and is a feeder club for the Scarlets. The club fields a senior and youth team.

== Club badge ==
Bethesda's club badge is a lion rampant in front of a lightning bolt on a blue background.
