= Bala RFC =

- Full name: Bala RFC
- Location: Bala, Wales
- Ground(s): Maes Gwyniad
- President: Elfyn Llwyd
- Coach(es): Bob Thomas
- League(s): WRU Division Four North
- 2011-12: 6th
Team kit

Official website
- www.clwbrygbibala.co.uk

Bala Rugby Football Club (Welsh: Clwb Rygbi Bala) is a rugby union team from the market town of Bala, North Wales. Bala RFC is a member of the Welsh Rugby Union and is a feeder club for the Scarlets.

== 2008/09 season ==
In 2009, Bala became the first team from the SWALEC Division Four North, also known as Division 1 North, to enter a play-off with the champions of Division Five North to decide the club's league place the next season. Due to league restructuring the bottom two clubs were automatically relegated, but Bala who lay in third from bottom place faced Bro Ffestiniog RFC who were champions of Division Five. Bala lost the game, which saw them relegated.
