= Nant Conwy RFC =

Rugby team in Conwy, Wales

(Wales) Nant Conwy
- Full name: Clwb Rygbi Nant Conwy
- Nickname: Teirw Nant Conwy Motto = Hwn yw tir nerth Teirw Nant
- Founded: 1980
- Location: Trefriw, Wales
- Ground: Pant Carw
- President: Sean Telor
- Coach: Bedwyr Jones
- League: WRU Division One North
- 2025/26: 1st
Team kit

Official website
- nantconwy.rfc.wales

Nant Conwy Rugby Football Club (Welsh: Clwb Rygbi Nant Conwy) is a rugby union team from the upper reaches of the Conwy Valley in North Wales. The club's grounds are located on the B5106 between the town of Llanrwst and the village of Trefriw.

They presently play in the Welsh Rugby Union Division One North League. Although Nant Conwy have a short history, having been established only in 1980, they have managed to achieve success on the pitch, earning several division promotions in recent years.

In 2007 the club successfully applied for funding to install floodlights at their ground.

In 2011 the club opened a new, extended clubhouse.

== Club badge ==
The club badge consists of the head of a black bull over the club's name, Clwb Rygbi Nant Conwy.

== Club honours ==
- 2001/02 WRU Division Six North - Champions
- 2008/09 WRU Division Four North - Champions
- 2009/10 WRU Division One North - Champions
- 2011/12 Swalec Plate - Runners Up
- 2012/13 WRU Division One North - Champions
- 2012/13 North Wales Cup - Champions
- 2014/15 North Wales Cup - Champions
- 2015/16 North Wales Cup - Champions
- 2017/18 WRU Division One North - Champions
- 2022/23 WRU Division One North - Champions
- 2023/24 WRU Division One North - Champions
- 2023/24 North Wales Cup Division 1 - Winners
- 2024/25 WRU Division One North - Champions
- 2024/25 North Wales Cup Division 1 - Winners
- 2025/26 WRU Division One North - Champions
- 2025/26 North Wales Cup Division 1 - Winners
- 2025/26 North Wales Cup Division 3 - Winners
