= Caernarfon RFC =

Rugby union club in Gwynedd, Wales

Coordinates: 53°07′49″N 4°15′54″W

(Wales) Clwb Rygbi Caernarfon
- Full name: Caernarfon Rugby Football Club
- Founded: 1973
- Location: Caernarfon, Wales
- Ground: Y Morfa
- Chairman: David Jones
- Coach(es): Rhys Thomas, Dafydd Roberts, Carl Russell Owen
- Captain: Liam Leung
- League: WRU Division One North
- 2025/26: 3rd
1st kit	2nd kit

Official website
- www.clwbrygbicaernarfon.co.uk

Caernarfon Rugby Football Club (Welsh: Clwb Rygbi Caernarfon) is a rugby union team from the town of Caernarfon, Gwynedd, North Wales. They currently play in the Welsh Rugby Union Division One North League.

The club was formed in 1973, and its home ground is Y Morfa, Lon Parc, Caernarfon.

The club colours are maroon and yellow.

The club fields a First XV, Second XV, Youth (Under-19) team, and a Women’s team. It also has an extensive junior section, with teams ranging from Under-8 through to Under-16.

The First XV competes in the WRU Division One North. The club appointed Rhys Thomas as head coach and Liam Leung as captain ahead of the 2025–26 season.

Caernarfon RFC enjoyed one of the most successful periods in the club’s history during the 2024–25 season, becoming the first club from North Wales to win the WRU Division One Cup. They defeated Bridgend Athletic 30–29 in the final at the Principality Stadium, Cardiff.

== Notable former players ==
- (Wales) Cai Griffiths
- (Wales) Morgan Williams
- (Wales) Rhun Williams
- (Wales) Iolo Evans
- (Wales) Caio Parry

== Club honours ==
- 2007–08 WRU Division Four North – Champions
- 2010–11 WRU Division One North – Champions
- 2011–12 WRU Division One North – Champions
- 2013–14 North Wales Senior Plate – Champions
- 2016–17 North Wales Senior Plate – Champions
- 2017–18 North Wales Senior Plate – Champions
- 2024–25 WRU Division One Cup – Champions
