= Llangefni RFC =

Rugby team in Anglesey, Wales

Coordinates: 53.252653°N 4.311169°W

- Full name: Llangefni Rugby Football Club
- Nickname(s): Cefni
- Founded: 1972
- Location: Llangefni, Wales
- Ground(s): Cae Smwrna (Capacity: 400)
- President: Eddie Burford
- Coach(es): Keith Withers Chris Campbell
- League(s): WRU Division One North
Team kit

Official website
- www.clwbrygbillangefni.co.uk

Llangefni Rugby Football Club (Welsh: Clwb Rygbi Llangefni) is a rugby union team from the town of Llangefni, on the island of Anglesey, North Wales. Llangefni RFC is a member of the Welsh Rugby Union.

== History ==
The club was formed in February 1972 through the efforts of Trefor Jones and Vernon Gwyr. Home games were played at the local comprehensive school and training sessions were held in the school gymnasium. Over the next few seasons the club expanded and made their first trip to Scotland to play Rosyth Civil Service in February 1973.

By the season 1973–74, the club were fielding two sides. The 1974–75 season shows progress being made with the club Winning 17 and drawing once out of 23 games. The Gwynedd League and Gwynedd Cup were both won. The formation of a youth team in 1988 became a turning point for the club. Almost all today's players being former youth players.

Several "clubhouses" and fields were used over the years until 1999 when a brand new clubhouse was opened by Wales hooker Robin McBryde. WRU senior status was achieved in 2003. The club continues to plan ahead with Lottery money being used for field improvements and sought for the erection of "playing" floodlights in the hope of raising the profile of the club with the attraction of representative games.

== 2006/07 Season ==
Llangefni RFC finished second in the WRU Division Three West league in the 2006–07 season, but found themselves demoted to WRU Division Four North, rather than promoted to Division Two West. This was due to a restructuring of the leagues by the Welsh Rugby Union. Llangefni challenged the ruling, but were unsuccessful in their action.

== Club Badge ==
The club badge shows a wild boar running over a map of Anglesey.
