= Llandudno RFC =

Welsh rugby union club, based in Llandudno, Wales

(Wales) Llandudno RFC
- Full name: Llandudno Rugby Football Club
- Founded: 1952; 74 years ago
- Location: Llandudno, Wales
- Ground: Maesdu Recreational Ground
- Chairman: Robin Holden
- President: Howie Roberts
- League: WRU Division One North
- 2011-12: 10th
Team kit

Official website
- www.llandudno-rugby.co.uk

Llandudno Rugby Football Club is a rugby union team from the town of Llandudno, North Wales. The club is a member of the Welsh Rugby Union and is a feeder club for the Scarlets. The team fields a first, seconds, youth and junior teams.

Llandudno RFC was established in 1952 when Liverpudlian, John Kidson, arrived in Llandudno and being a rugby union fan, was surprised to find the town had no team. Within a few months he had managed to gain enough local support and Llandudno RFC fielded a team for the 1952-53 season; though without a pitch the team played all matches away. The next year Conwy Football team disbanded and after some negotiation Llandudno were allowed to take over the Conway Morfa ground.

In 1957 a fire destroyed the changing rooms at the Morfa ground and the club were forced to move to a new pitch founded on the local Maesdu tip. In 1959 the club applied for and gained membership of the Welsh Rugby Union.

== Club honours ==
North Wales cup 1999/2000

North Wales cup 2000/2001

North Wales trophy - 2008
