= Pwllheli RFC =

Welsh rugby club in Pwllheli, Gwynedd

(Wales) Pwllheli RFC
- Full name: Pwllheli Rugby Football Club
- Founded: 1972
- Location: Pwllheli, Wales
- Ground: Parc Bodegroes
- Chairman: Wil Martin
- Coach: Ian D.LL.Jones
- League: WRU Division One North
- 2011-12: 5th
Team kit

Official website
- pwllheli.clwbrygbi.cymru

Pwllheli Rugby Football Club (Welsh: Clwb Rygbi Pwllheli) is a rugby union team from the town of Pwllheli, in Gwynedd, North Wales. Pwllheli RFC is a member of the Welsh Rugby Union and is a feeder club for RGC 1404. They currently compete in the WRU Division One North league.

== Notable past players ==
- (Wales) Sam Roberts
- (Wales) Rhodri Jones
- (Wales) Jack Roberts

== Club honours ==
- WRU Division Five North 2007/08 Champions
- WRU Division One North 2014/15 Champions
