= Argoed High School =

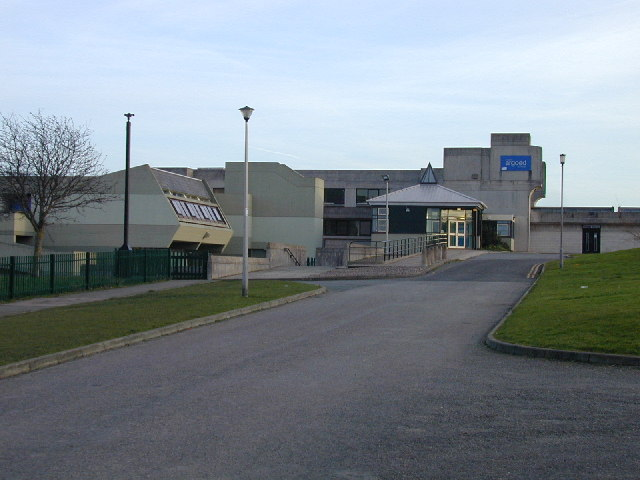
- Argoed High School in 2006

Location
- Bryn Road; Bryn Y Baal, Flintshire, CH7 6RY; Wales

Information
- Type: Secondary school
- Motto: "Learning Together, Working Together, Succeeding Together"
- Established: 1978
- Chair: N Pearce
- Headteacher: Paul Smith
- Gender: Mixed
- Colour: White
- Contact No: 01352756414
- Website: http://www.argoedhs.co.uk/

Argoed High School is a secondary school in Flintshire, Wales. In January 2022, a proposal for a new superschool was accepted, incorporating nearby Ysgol Mynydd Isa.

== History ==
It was built in Bryn-y-baal in 1978 as the then Clwyd County's first purpose built 11-16 school at a time when the county authorities were proposing to introduce a tertiary system. Its design has been described as "a bold but also contextual Brutalist style" by the Twentieth Century Society. The first head teacher was Bryn Ellis. The school has remained the same for most of its existence but building work started by Alison Brown (the school's third headteacher) has seen a new reception and sports hall.

In 2021, with plans to demolish and replace the original buildings, heritage campaigners applied to have the site listed. This was refused by Cadw, who deemed the school "not particularly noteworthy".

== Notable former pupils ==
- Sabrina Fortune, shot putter
