= Ruthin RFC =

Rugby team in Ruthin, Wales

(Wales) Clwb Rygbi Rhuthun - Ruthin RFC
- Full name: Ruthin Rugby Football Club
- Location: Ruthin, Wales
- Ground(s): Y Pafiliwn, Cae Ddol
- Chairman: John Palmer
- President: John Gower Hughes
- Coach: Eifion Lewis Roberts
- League: WRU Division One North
Team kit

Official website
- www.rygbirhuthun.com

Ruthin Rugby Football Club (Welsh: Clwb Rygbi Rhuthun) is a rugby union team from the town of Ruthin, North Wales. Ruthin RFC presently play in the Welsh Rugby Union Division One North League and is a hub club for RGC, the North Wales Regional team.

== Club history ==
A rugby club was first formed in Ruthin in the 1920s, but that early club folded in 1933 and was not reformed until the 1960s. Since then, Ruthin has been one of the premier clubs in North Wales and has produced a number of players for North Wales and other representative teams. The list of honours below highlight that the club had successful side in the 1970s and many from that Ruthin team are still actively involved in the club.

Ruthin returned to Division 4 North in the 2006-7 season after 2 years in Division 3 South East. The club were not relegated, but elected to return to the North Wales league in advance of a decision by the WRU that they would not have been able to play in the South Wales leagues in 2007. Ruthin had gained promotion to Division 3 in 2004 after winning the league in North Wales and the 2005-06 North Wales Cup under two of the most successful coaches Ruthin have had in Paul Threlfall and Russell Penrhyn Jones, both former players. They guided the club to their first North Wales league win for almost 30 years, this highlighted the club's leading position in North Wales. Having lost over 15 players due to injury, retirement and transfers at the end of the 2005-06 season, 2006-07 was one of rebuilding and a number of promising young players have emerged to take the club forward in the next few years. Winning the North Wales Cup again in 2007-08 was a notable achievement for Ruthin's young side. For the 2009/2010 season Rhuthun returned to wearing the original Blue and White hoop kit for the club 10th anniversary after returning in 1999, the current away kit is a pink and white hoop kit.

During the 2013-14 season, Ruthin won the North Wales Cup for the seventh time after a match with Pwllheli. Currently, the club has nearly 300 registered players between U7 and U16.

== Former players of note ==
In 1992, James Salisbury became the first Ruthin produced player to earn a Welsh Youth Cap and after playing for Liverpool St Helens and Widnes RL. Two other members include Eifion Lewis-Roberts and Rob Higgitt who are recent first team players and products of Ruthin's youth system. Lewis-Roberts played for Sale Sharks for over 10 years and played for spell in the Top 14 for Toulon. Higgitt played for the Scarlets and played for Bristol for several years. Lewis-Roberts is the first former Ruthin player to have donned a Wales senior team shirt when he made his debut appearance against Canada in November 2008. Hollywood actor Rhys Ifans is also a product of the club's youth system having played mini-rugby for Ruthin along with his brother Llŷr. England International Archie McParland also started his rugby youth career at Ruthin from the age of 5.

== Club honours ==
Welsh Rugby Union National Sevens Group Finals Winners 1967

North Wales Club Championship 1972/73, 1974/75, 1976/77, 2003/04

North Wales Cup 1971/72, 1972/73, 1974/75, 1976/77, 2005/06, 2007/08, 2013/14

North Wales (District J) 1973/74, 1976/77, 1984/85, 2005/06

North Wales (District J) Sevens Shield 1974/75, 1978/79, 1979/80, 1980/81

Machynlleth Sevens 2006/07 Llangoed Sevens 2011 NE Wales Sevens Plate 2013

Clwyd Cup (2nds) 2008/09, 2009/10, 2010/11, 2011/12, 2012/13, 2013/14, 2014/15, 2015/16

North Wales 2nds League 2013/14

North Wales Youth Cup 2010/11, 2011/12, Finalist 2016/17 North Wales Youth League 2010/11
