= Colwyn Bay RFC =

Welsh rugby union team

(Wales) Colwyn Bay RFC
- Full name: Colwyn Bay Rugby Football Club
- Nickname(s): The Seahorses
- Founded: 1923
- Location: Colwyn Bay, Wales
- Ground(s): Brookfield Drive
- President: Geoff Taylor
- League(s): WRU Division 2 North
- 2018-19: 10th
Team kit

Official website
- www.colwynbayrugby.com

Colwyn Bay Rugby Football Club (Welsh: Clwb Rygbi Bae Colwyn) is a rugby union team from the town of Colwyn Bay, North Wales. Colwyn Bay RFC is a member of the Welsh Rugby Union and is a feeder club for RGC 1404.

== History ==
The first record of a match played in Colwyn Bay took place on the Rhos Preparatory School ground on New Year's Day, 1923, when the opponents were a Chester XV. There were frequent changes in playing locations and changing rooms and consequently the game did not prosper after the promising start of the first few seasons.

One success at that time was Wilf Wooller, a club member who went on to represent Sale RFC, Cambridge University, Cardiff RFC and then Wales, starring in the 1935 Welsh victory over New Zealand. In 1936 it was decided that the club could not continue and players who were keen joined Rhyl and District RFC, who were also recipients of the goal posts. The bank balance of £15 was handed to the North Wales Rugby Union.

In 1953 rugby football became more firmly established in North Wales and a meeting was called at the Queens Hotel, Old Colwyn, at which 12 people attended. Led by a very active Secretary, Tom Bellis, aided by Rydal School (now Rydal Penrhos) masters and old players of the school, the foundations were laid for today's successful club. A settled "home" was a long time coming but the local Council were most helpful in 1965 in providing us with a pitch at Glan-y-Don, Old Colwyn, and cow sheds which were part of Glan-y-Don Home Farm. The cowsheds were converted into adequate changing rooms and a licensed bar was also applied for and set up.

Unfortunately, there was a further hitch in the late 1960s when the new Police H.Q. required part of the field and the Highway Authority acquired the other half of the pitch for the slip road from the A55 Expressway to Old Colwyn. The council came to our rescue once more and provided us with a long lease on our present ground at Brookfield Drive, which was donated, to the council by the late Victor Wilde for recreational purposes.

The ground consists of three flat adjoining pitches, training area, car park and Clubhouse. In September, 1975, the present Club House was officially opened by Mike Roberts, a Club member, Welsh International and a British Lion, and additional facilities of a lounge bar and gymnasium have been added since.

The early nineties saw Colwyn Bay Rugby win the north Wales Championship twice prior to promotion to the National Leagues. Colwyn Bay Rugby currently fields a 1st XV that play in WRU Division Two (North). We also run second XV, Women's and Youth XV's as well as a vibrant and growing Mini & Junior Section.

In 2008, Colwyn Bay were losing finalist against Ruthin in the North Wales Cup.

== Notable former players ==
- (Wales) Wilf Wooller (18 caps)
- Mike Roberts - Wales (8 caps) British Lions, London Welsh,
- Rachel C. Taylor (45 caps) Wales Women
