= Mold RFC =

Welsh rugby union club, based in Mold, Flintshire

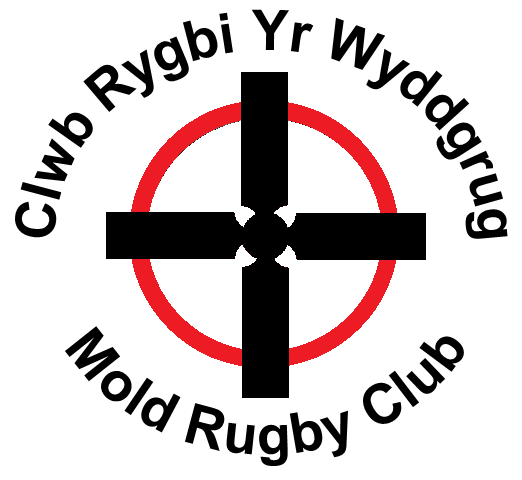
- Full name: Mold Rugby Football Club - Clwb Rygbi Yr Wyddgrug
- Founded: 1935
- Location: Mold, Wales
- Ground: Chester Road
- Chairman: Colin Ellis, Darren Martin
- Director of Rugby: Paul Smith
- Coach(es): Oli Heald, Rowan Walley, Aled Ellis, Rhys Hellen, Rhys Williams and Joe Jones
- League: WRU Division One North
Team kit

Official website
- mold.rfc.wales

Mold Rugby Football Club is a rugby union team from the town of Mold, North Wales. They presently play in the Welsh Rugby Union Division One North League.

Mold Rugby Club is a members' run club. They are based at their Chester Road Ground, within 1/4 mile of Mold town centre.

There are currently over 500 playing and non-playing members varying in all ages from aspiring internationals aged as young as 6, through to life members.

Mold RFC have both Mini and Junior sections which run teams from under 7s through to under 16s. There is also an intermediate Youth team and four senior teams consisting of Veterans, 3rd's, 2nd's and 1st team.

The club has a history of both successful teams and individuals, and have provided players at youth level, a number of whom are now involved at North Wales Academy, Scarlet's/Osprey's region and national representative levels. Players such as James King and Haydn Pugh at the Ospreys and Rob McCusker at the Scarlets. Rhys Williams is with Salford Red Devils Rugby League club playing in Super League. In 2012, two tries in a fixture against France saw Williams overtake Iestyn Harris to become Wales' all-time leading try scorer.

As well as producing players the club has also helped develop coaches the most successful of which being former club chairman Dennley Issac with Wales Youth.

There is substantial Junior and Mini representation at N E Wales Schools and Gogledd Cymru at all age group levels (U12 upwards).

== History ==
The club was formed mainly by teaching staff who moved from south Wales to the area to take up teaching positions. Despite the club being formed during the 1934-35 season, no teams were put out between 1958 and 1974. During this period, many local players went to play for Ruthin, but by 1969 discussions were taking place to start a team at Mold. In 1974, following a series of meetings, a youth team was set up, with players from the over-subscribed youth set up at Ruthin moving to Mold. Flintshire County Council granted permission for the club to play on the ground and the headteacher of Bryn Coch school allowed the use of the school's changing rooms. By 1976, the club had grown to have two senior teams and a youth team.

== Club honours ==
- 2005-06 WRU Division Four North - Champions Undefeated
- 2006-07 WRU Division Four North champions
- 2006-07 North Wales Cup winners
- 2022-23 WRU Division Two Cup Winners

== Club history ==
Past players

Robin McBryde – Wales/British and Irish Lions

Rob McCusker – Wales

Rhys Williams – Wales Rugby League

Past club chairpersons

1974–1977 R M Taylor

1977–1980 A Evans

1980–1981 J Ambrose

1981–1988 C S Mapp

1988–1993 R F Jones

1993–1997 D George-Jones

1997–1998 J Hirrell

1998–2002 M Lukey

2002–2005 G Flint

2005–2009 D Isaac

2009–present T Johnson

Past Club Presidents

1974–1978 D V Leadbeater

1978–1993 H A Anderson

1993–2000 R F Jones

2000–2005 M Farmer Q.C.

2005–2009 J Jeffrey

2009–present G Williams

Life members

Q. R. H. Dodd

A. Evans

B. Jones

R. F. Jones

A. Lowndes

G. Lynch

R. McBryde

E. Rothwell

R. Stevens

Club colours

1994 B Wynne

1995 J Jeffrey

1996 Parry

1996 V White

1996 G Bellis

1996 R Buckler

1997 T Fuller

1997 M Lukey

1998 R J Lamb

1998 H Anderson

1998 W Jones

2000 J Hughes

2009 C Hughes

2010 E Kirby

Past club captains

1974–1975 – C Davies

1975–1976 – L L Evans

1976–1978 – C Mapp

1978–1980 – J Barker

1980–1981 – P Roach

1981–1983 – D Morgan

1983–1984 – D George-Jones

1984–1985 – M Morris

1985–1986 – K Catherall

1986–1988 – J Goggin

1988–1989 – M Ferguson

1989–1990 – M Davies

1990–1991 – P Higginson

1991–1993 – W Jones

1993–1995 – H Mitchell

1995–1996 – R Lloyd

1996–1997 – M Davies

1997–1998 – H Mitchell

1998–2001 – E Whitley

2001–2003 – A Roberts

2003–2004 – J Griffiths

2004–2005 – J Studley

2005–2007 – S Henshaw

2007–2010 – J Shirley

2010–present – R Whalley

Representative honours

1981 Wales Districts – Brynley Wynne

1989 North Wales Under 23 – David Trevelyan Roberts

1989 RAF Under 21 – David Trevelyan Roberts

1989 Combined Services Under 21 – David Trevelyan Roberts

1989 Wales Schools – Clarke Goodwin

1990 Wales Youth – Clarke Goodwin

1991 Wales Under 21 – Robin McBryde

1993 Wales A – Robin McBryde

1993 Wales Schools – Luke Skeffington

1994 Wales – Robin McBryde

1994 Wales U20 – Colin Ellis

1995 Wales U20 – Mark Shields

1997 Combined Services U20 – Mark Shields

1997 Combined Services U20 – Mike Roberts

1998 Royal Navy U21 – Mike Roberts

1998 Army U21 – Christian Badham

1998 Combined Services U21 – Christian Badham

1999 Army U21 – Mark Shields

2001 International Barbarians – Richard Scott

2001 British & Irish Lions – Robin McBryde

2006 Wales U18 – Hadyn Pugh

2006 Wales U21 – Rob McCusker

2006 Wales Colleges – Ryan Forshaw

2007 Wales 7's – Rob McCusker

2007 Wales U19 – Hadyn Pugh

2008 Wales U18 – James King

2008 Wales Rugby League – Rhys Williams

2009 Wales U20 – James King

2009 Wales Rugby League U18 – Joe Sproston

2010 Wales – Rob McCusker

2011 Wales Presidents XV U18 – Alex Schwarz

2011 Wales U16 – Luke Williams

2011 Wales U16 – Rhys Williams

2011 Wales U18 – Alex Schwarz

2011 Wales Rugby League Students – Joe Sproston

2012 Wales Rugby League Dragonhearts – Ollie Hughes
