= 2011–12 National League 2 North =

Rugby union competition in England

- Countries: England
- Champions: Loughborough Students
- Runners-up: Caldy
- Relegated: Kendal, Nuneaton, Harrogate
- Attendance: 59,549 (average 257 per match) (Note: Note that 8 home attendances are missing (see below) - so the total attendance will not be 100% accurate. The average attendance has also been taken into account with the missing games not included.)
- Highest attendance: 1,214; Loughborough Students v Nuneaton; 20 April 2012
- Lowest attendance: 100 (multiple teams)
- Top point scorer: (England) Chris Johnson (Huddersfield); 362 points
- Top try scorer: (England) Craig Holland (Loughborough Students); 27 tries

The 2011–12 National League 2 North was the third season (twenty-fifth overall) of the fourth tier (north) of the English domestic rugby union competitions since the professionalised format of the second division was introduced. The league system was 4 points for a win, 2 points for a draw and additional bonus points being awarded for scoring 4 or more tries and/or losing within 7 points of the victorious team. In terms of promotion the league champions would go straight up into National League 1 while the runners up would have a one-game playoff against the runners up from National League 2 South (at the home ground of the club with the superior league record) for the final promotion place.

After two years of missing out on promotion via the playoffs, Loughborough Students went one better and won the league title outright, being easily the best side in the division and finishing 22 points clear of the rest of the pack to gain promotion to the 2012–13 National League 1. While Loughborough Students were clear winners the battle for second place was much tighter with Caldy eventually taking the runners up place just 1 point ahead of Preston Grasshoppers and Hull. Caldy's luck would run out in the promotion playoff, however, losing 20 - 13 away to 2011–12 National League 2 South runners up Richmond. Apart from Kendal who were the first team to go down, it was very tightly contested at the bottom of the table as with bonus points paying a huge role in determining Nuneaton's relegation, with the Nun's 10 victories being supplanted with just 6 bonus points. The final side to go down was Harrogate who finished 1 point adrift of 13th placed Leicester Lions, with more wins than the Leicestershire side but not enough bonus points. Kendal and Harrogate would drop to National League 3 North while Nuneaton would fall to National League 3 Midlands.

== Participating teams and locations ==
Twelve of the teams listed below participated in the 2010–11 National League 2 North season; Otley were relegated from the 2010–11 National League 1, Bromsgrove (champions) and Sheffield Tigers (playoffs) would come up from National League 3 Midlands while Stockport were promoted as champions of National League 3 North.

Locations of the 2011-12 National League 2 North teams

Team	Stadium	Capacity	City/Area
Bromsgrove	Finstall Park		Bromsgrove, Worcestershire
Caldy	Paton Field	4,000	Thurstaston, Wirral, Merseyside
Harrogate	Claro Road	4,500 (500 seats)	Harrogate, North Yorkshire
Huddersfield	Lockwood Park	1,500 (500 seats)	Huddersfield, West Yorkshire
Hull	Ferens Ground	1,500 (288 seats)	Kingston upon Hull, East Riding of Yorkshire
Hull Ionians	Brantingham Park	1,500 (240 seats)	Brantingham, East Riding of Yorkshire
Kendal	Mint Bridge	4,600 (600 seats)	Kendal, Cumbria
Leicester Lions	Westleigh Park	2,000	Blaby, Leicestershire
Loughborough Students	Loughborough University Stadium	3,000	Loughborough, Leicestershire
Luctonians	Mortimer Park	2,200	Kingsland, Herefordshire
Nuneaton	Liberty Way	3,800 (500 seats)	Nuneaton, Warwickshire
Otley	Cross Green	7,000 (852 seats)	Otley, West Yorkshire
Preston Grasshoppers	Lightfoot Green	2,250 (250 seats)	Preston, Lancashire
Sheffield Tigers	Dore Moor	1,000	Sheffield, South Yorkshire
Stockport	The Memorial Ground	500	Stockport, Greater Manchester
Westoe	Wood Terrace		South Shields, Tyne and Wear

== Final league table ==
2011–12 National League 2 North table
Pos	Team	Pld	W	D	L	PF	PA	PD	TB	LB	Pts	Qualification
1	Loughborough Students (C)	30	24	2	4	939	500	+439	15	2	117	Promoted
2	Caldy	30	19	0	11	869	631	+238	13	6	95	Promotion play-off
3	Preston Grasshoppers	30	18	2	10	870	636	+234	14	4	94	
4	Hull	30	18	1	11	698	581	+117	13	7	94	
5	Luctonians	30	19	0	11	694	557	+137	9	4	89	
6	Huddersfield	30	17	3	10	662	525	+137	8	5	87	
7	Westoe	30	15	0	15	681	715	−34	12	7	79	
8	Bromsgrove	30	14	2	14	806	617	+189	13	6	79	
9	Sheffield Tigers	30	14	0	16	605	623	−18	9	8	73	
10	Stockport	30	13	0	17	642	653	−11	9	7	68	
11	Hull Ionians	30	13	0	17	594	767	−173	8	5	65	
12	Otley	30	11	1	18	610	836	−226	12	3	61	
13	Leicester Lions	30	10	3	17	613	712	−99	7	7	60	
14	Harrogate (R)	30	11	2	17	555	725	−170	6	5	59	Relegated
15	Nuneaton (R)	30	10	2	18	524	757	−233	1	5	50	Relegated
16	Kendal (R)	30	5	0	25	473	1000	−527	4	9	33	Relegated

Updated to match(es) played on 28-04-2012. Source: Rugby Statbunker
(C) Champion; (R) Relegated

== Results ==
=== Round 1 ===
27 August 2011
15:00

Bromsgrove	27 - 13	Sheffield Tigers
	Report

Finstall Park
Attendance: 190
Referee: David Proctor

27 August 2011
15:00

(BP) Caldy	38 - 20	Nuneaton
	Report

Paton Field
Attendance: 161
Referee: Tom Foley

27 August 2011
15:00

(BP) Hull	18 - 22	Westoe (BP)
	Report

Ferens Ground
Attendance: 185
Referee: Will Halford

27 August 2011
15:00

(BP) Kendal	13 - 15	Luctonians
	Report

Mint Bridge
Attendance: 300
Referee: Matthew Daubney

27 August 2011
15:00

Leicester Lions	3 - 41	Harrogate (BP)
	Report

Westleigh Park
Attendance: 133
Referee: Simon Harding

27 August 2011
15:00

(BP) Loughborough Students	33 - 19	Preston Grasshoppers
	Report

Loughborough University Stadium
Attendance: 110
Referee: Karl Kirkpatrick

27 August 2011
15:00

(BP) Otley	24 - 3	Hull Ionians
	Report

Cross Green
Attendance: 259
Referee: Brendan Fitzmaurice

27 August 2011
15:00

(BP) Stockport	30 - 42	Huddersfield (BP)
	Report

The Memorial Ground
Attendance: 303
Referee: Wayne Falla

=== Round 2 ===
3 September 2011
14:30

(BP) Nuneaton	38 - 32	Kendal (2BP)
	Report

Liberty Way
Attendance: 197
Referee: Brendan Fitzmaurice

3 September 2011
15:00

Harrogate	13 - 28	Bromsgrove
	Report

Claro Road
Attendance: 200
Referee: Marcus Caton

3 September 2011
15:00

Hull Ionians	13 - 11	Huddersfield (BP)
	Report

Brantingham Park
Attendance: 250
Referee: Karl Kirkpatrick

3 September 2011
15:00

(BP) Luctonians	43 - 14	Leicester Lions
	Report

Mortimer Park
Attendance: 420
Referee: Nick Williams

3 September 2011
15:00

Otley	20 - 15	Hull (BP)
	Report

Cross Green
Attendance: 305
Referee: Matthew Daubney

3 September 2011
15:00

Preston Grasshoppers	27 - 15	Caldy
	Report

Lightfoot Green
Attendance: 318
Referee: Philip Davis

3 September 2011
15:00

Sheffield Tigers	13 - 24	Westoe (BP)
	Report

Dore Moor
Attendance: 200
Referee: D Edmunds

3 September 2011
15:00

(BP) Stockport	27 - 21	Loughborough Students (BP)
	Report

The Memorial Ground
Attendance: 180
Referee: Andrew Vertigan

=== Round 3 ===
10 September 2011
14:00

(BP) Loughborough Students	48 - 8	Hull Ionians
	Report

Loughborough University Stadium
Attendance: 185
Referee: Will Halford

10 September 2011
14:00

(BP) Westoe	29 - 10	Harrogate
	Report

Wood Terrace
Attendance: 104
Referee: Matthew Daubney

10 September 2011
15:00

(BP) Bromsgrove	6 - 10	Luctonians
	Report

Finstall Park
Attendance: 450
Referee: Brendan Fitzmaurice

10 September 2011
15:00

Caldy	26 - 10	Stockport
	Report

Paton Field
Attendance: 193
Referee: Andy Rawson

10 September 2011
15:00

Huddersfield	22 - 7	Otley
	Report

Lockwood Park
Attendance: 315
Referee: D Edmunds

10 September 2011
15:00

(2BP) Hull	29 - 33	Sheffield Tigers (BP)
	Report

Ferens Ground
Referee: Luke Haskins

10 September 2011
15:00

Kendal	22 - 13	Preston Grasshoppers
	Report

Mint Bridge
Attendance: 400
Referee: Karl Kirkpatrick

10 September 2011
15:00

Leicester Lions	15 - 28	Nuneaton
	Report

Westleigh Park
Referee: Andrew Vertigan

=== Round 4 ===
17 September 2011
14:00

Luctonians	20 - 14	Westoe (BP)
	Report

Mortimer Park
Attendance: 435
Referee: Nick Williams

17 September 2011
14:00

Nuneaton	22 - 18	Bromsgrove (BP)
	Report

Liberty Way
Attendance: 153
Referee: Paul Kimber

17 September 2011
14:30

Preston Grasshoppers	17 - 13	Leicester Lions (BP)
	Report

Lightfoot Green
Attendance: 175
Referee: Mark Liddell

17 September 2011
15:00

Harrogate	19 - 15	Sheffield Tigers (BP)
	Report

Claro Road
Attendance: 150
Referee: Will Halford

17 September 2011
15:00

Hull Ionians	11 - 34	Caldy (BP)
	Report

Brantingham Park
Attendance: 250
Referee: Matthew Daubney

17 September 2011
15:00

Huddersfield	9 - 7	Hull (BP)
	Report

Lockwood Park
Attendance: 171
Referee: D Edmunds

17 September 2011
15:00

(BP) Stockport	35 - 23	Kendal
	Report

The Memorial Ground
Attendance: 121
Referee: Brendan Fitzmaurice

17 September 2011
15:00

Otley	21 - 30	Loughborough Students (BP)
	Report

Cross Green
Attendance: 289
Referee: Karl Kirkpatrick

=== Round 5 ===
24 September 2011
14:00

(BP) Leicester Lions	36 - 34	Stockport (2BP)
	Report

Westleigh Park
Attendance: 130
Referee: Brendan Fitzmaurice

24 September 2011
14:00

Loughborough Students	30 - 30	Huddersfield
	Report

Loughborough University Stadium
Attendance: 100
Referee: Matthew Daubney

24 September 2011
14:00

(BP) Westoe	41 - 6	Nuneaton
	Report

Wood Terrace
Attendance: 143
Referee: Will Halford

24 September 2011
15:00

(BP) Bromsgrove	31 - 31	Preston Grasshoppers (BP)
	Report

Finstall Park
Attendance: 200
Referee: Nick Williams

24 September 2011
15:00

(BP) Caldy	59 - 25	Otley (BP)
	Report

Paton Field
Attendance: 136
Referee: D Edmunds

24 September 2011
15:00

(BP) Hull	32 - 22	Harrogate (BP)
	Report

Ferens Ground
Attendance: 180
Referee: Karl Kirkpatrick

24 September 2011
15:00

(BP) Kendal	37 - 21	Hull Ionians
	Report

Mint Bridge
Attendance: 256
Referee: Mark Liddell

24 September 2011
15:00

(BP) Sheffield Tigers	24 - 19	Luctonians (BP)
	Report

Dore Moor
Attendance: 180
Referee: Wayne Falla

=== Round 6 ===
1 October 2011
14:00

(BP) Loughborough Students	35 - 7	Hull
	Report

Loughborough University Stadium
Attendance: 230
Referee: Tom Foley

1 October 2011
14:00

Nuneaton	26 - 22	Sheffield Tigers (2BP)
	Report

Liberty Way
Attendance: 167
Referee: Ed Turnill

1 October 2011
14:00

Preston Grasshoppers	27 - 20	Westoe (BP)
	Report

Lightfoot Green
Attendance: 231
Referee: Matthew Daubney

1 October 2011
15:00

(BP) Huddersfield	25 - 26	Caldy
	Report

Lockwood Park
Attendance: 203
Referee: Will Halford

1 October 2011
15:00

Hull Ionians	16 - 27	Leicester Lions
	Report

Brantingham Park
Attendance: 250
Referee: D Edmunds

1 October 2011
15:00

(BP) Luctonians	38 - 12	Harrogate
	Report

Mortimer Park
Attendance: 465
Referee: Paul Kimber

1 October 2011
15:00

(BP) Otley	46 - 34	Kendal (BP)
	Report

Cross Green
Attendance: 313
Referee: Brendan Fitzmaurice

1 October 2011
15:00

Stockport	24 - 14	Bromsgrove
	Report

The Memorial Ground
Attendance: 143
Referee: Wayne Falla

=== Round 7 ===
8 October 2011
14:00

Leicester Lions	22 - 13	Otley
	Report

Westleigh Park
Attendance: 100
Referee: Rob Warburton

8 October 2011
14:00

(BP) Westoe	20 - 26	Stockport (BP)
	Report

Wood Terrace
Attendance: 188
Referee: Brendan Fitzmaurice

8 October 2011
15:00

(BP) Bromsgrove	38 - 10	Hull Ionians
	Report

Finstall Park
Attendance: 300
Referee: Jason Bessant

8 October 2011
15:00

Caldy	17 - 31	Loughborough Students
	Report

Paton Field
Attendance: 210
Referee: Richard Kelly

8 October 2011
15:00

Harrogate	17 - 17	Nuneaton
	Report

Claro Road
Attendance: 130
Referee: Luke Haskins

8 October 2011
15:00

Hull	15 - 14	Luctonians (BP)
	Report

Ferens Ground
Attendance: 140
Referee: Mark Liddell

8 October 2011
15:00

Kendal	5 - 41	Huddersfield (BP)
	Report

Mint Bridge
Referee: Andrew Vertigan

8 October 2011
15:00

Sheffield Tigers	17 - 30	Preston Grasshoppers
	Report

Dore Moor
Attendance: 150
Referee: Karl Kirkpatrick

=== Round 8 ===
15 October 2011
14:00

(BP) Loughborough Students	59 - 24	Kendal
	Report

Loughborough University Stadium
Attendance: 650
Referee: Will Halford

15 October 2011
14:00

(BP) Nuneaton	19 - 20	Luctonians
	Report

Liberty Way
Attendance: 183
Referee: Andrew Jackson

15 October 2011
14:00

(BP) Preston Grasshoppers	39 - 10	Harrogate
	Report

Lightfoot Green
Attendance: 301
Referee: Wayne Falla

15 October 2011
15:00

Caldy	19 - 14	Hull (BP)
	Report

Paton Field
Attendance: 113
Referee: Brendan Fitzmaurice

15 October 2011
15:00

Huddersfield	16 - 8	Leicester Lions
	Report

Lockwood Park
Attendance: 319
Referee: Matthew Daubney

15 October 2011
15:00

Hull Ionians	22 - 34	Westoe (BP)
	Report

Brantingham Park
Attendance: 200
Referee: Fergus Kirby

15 October 2011
15:00

(BP) Otley	41 - 12	Bromsgrove
	Report

Cross Green
Attendance: 329
Referee: Mike Cooper

15 October 2011
15:00

(BP) Stockport	20 - 23	Sheffield Tigers
	Report

The Memorial Ground
Attendance: 120
Referee: Andrew Vertigan

=== Round 9 ===
22 October 2011
14:00

Leicester Lions	26 - 22	Loughborough Students (BP)
	Report

Westleigh Park
Attendance: 150
Referee: Karl Kirkpatrick

22 October 2011
14:00

(BP) Westoe	35 - 12	Otley
	Report

Wood Terrace
Attendance: 202
Referee: Andrew Vertigan

22 October 2011
15:00

(BP) Bromsgrove	33 - 20	Huddersfield
	Report

Finstall Park
Attendance: 323
Referee: Ed Turnill

22 October 2011
15:00

Harrogate	24 - 18	Stockport (BP)
	Report

Claro Road
Attendance: 230
Referee: Simon Walker

22 October 2011
15:00

(BP) Hull	34 - 16	Nuneaton
	Report

Ferens Ground
Attendance: 170
Referee: Wayne Falla

22 October 2011
15:00

Kendal	8 - 59	Caldy (BP)
	Report

Mint Bridge
Attendance: 362
Referee: Andy Rawson

22 October 2011
15:00

Luctonians	22 - 15	Preston Grasshoppers (BP)
	Report

Mortimer Park
Attendance: 446
Referee: Mark Liddell

22 October 2011
15:00

(BP) Sheffield Tigers	48 - 18	Hull Ionians
	Report

Dore Moor
Attendance: 150
Referee: Marcus Caton

=== Round 10 ===
29 October 2011
14:00

(BP) Loughborough Students	37 - 15	Bromsgrove
	Report

Loughborough University Stadium
Attendance: 450
Referee: Simon McConnell

29 October 2011
14:30

(BP) Preston Grasshoppers	36 - 22	Nuneaton
	Report

Lightfoot Green
Attendance: 347
Referee: Llyr Apgeraint-Roberts

29 October 2011
15:00

(BP) Caldy	29 - 15	Leicester Lions
	Report

Paton Field
Attendance: 181
Referee: John Healy

29 October 2011
15:00

Huddersfield	26 - 15	Westoe
	Report

Lockwood Park
Attendance: 273
Referee: Graham Dickens

29 October 2011
15:00

Hull Ionians	24 - 18	Harrogate (BP)
	Report

Brantingham Park
Attendance: 300
Referee: Phil Watters

29 October 2011
15:00

(BP) Kendal	6 - 12	Hull
	Report

Mint Bridge
Attendance: 275
Referee: Andrew Vertigan

29 October 2011
15:00

(BP) Otley	46 - 28	Sheffield Tigers (BP)
	Report

Cross Green
Attendance: 367
Referee: Brendan Fitzmaurice

29 October 2011
15:00

Stockport	31 - 14	Luctonians
	Report

The Memorial Ground
Attendance: 162
Referee: Paul Kimber

=== Round 11 ===
5 November 2011
14:00

Harrogate	20 - 11	Otley
	Report

Claro Road
Attendance: 480
Referee: Tom Foley

5 November 2011
14:00

(BP) Hull	30 - 21	Preston Grasshoppers
	Report

Ferens Ground
Attendance: 190
Referee: D Edmunds

5 November 2011
14:00

(BP) Leicester Lions	46 - 8	Kendal
	Report

Westleigh Park
Attendance: 100
Referee: Fergus Kirby

5 November 2011
14:00

(BP) Nuneaton	12 - 19	Stockport
	Report

Liberty Way
Attendance: 213
Referee: Mike Cooper

5 November 2011
14:00

Westoe	8 - 39	Loughborough Students (BP)
	Report

Wood Terrace
Attendance: 177
Referee: Lloyd Linton

5 November 2011
14:15

(BP) Bromsgrove	30 - 28	Caldy (BP)
	Report

Finstall Park
Attendance: 270
Referee: David Procter

5 November 2011
14:15

(BP) Luctonians	45 - 10	Hull Ionians
	Report

Mortimer Park
Attendance: 410
Referee: Karl Kirkpatrick

5 November 2011
14:15

(BP) Sheffield Tigers	14 - 18	Huddersfield
	Report

Dore Moor
Attendance: 150
Referee: Wayne Falla

=== Round 12 ===
12 November 2011
14:00

(BP) Hull Ionians	23 - 27	Nuneaton (BP)
	Report

Brantingham Park
Attendance: 150
Referee: Brendan Fitzmaurice

12 November 2011
14:00

Kendal	14 - 3	Bromsgrove
	Report

Mint Bridge
Attendance: 290
Referee: Matthew Daubney

12 November 2011
14:00

Leicester Lions	19 - 19	Hull
	Report

Westleigh Park
Attendance: 245
Referee: Andrea Spandoni

12 November 2011
14:00

Loughborough Students	26 - 10	Sheffield Tigers
	Report

Loughborough University Stadium
Attendance: 363
Referee: Paul Kimber

12 November 2011
14:15

Caldy	36 - 29	Westoe (BP)
	Report

Paton Field
Attendance: 429
Referee: Greg MacDonald

12 November 2011
14:15

(BP) Otley	20 - 36	Luctonians (BP)
	Report

Cross Green
Attendance: 437
Referee: Simon Walker

12 November 2011
14:15

Stockport	20 - 30	Preston Grasshoppers
	Report

The Memorial Ground
Attendance: 159
Referee: Karl Kirkpatrick

12 November 2011
15:00

(BP) Huddersfield	49 - 13	Harrogate
	Report

Lockwood Park
Attendance: 389
Referee: Andrew Vertigan

=== Round 13 ===
19 November 2011
14:00

(BP) Harrogate	17 - 24	Loughborough Students
	Report

Claro Road
Attendance: 200
Referee: Will Halford

19 November 2011
14:00

Hull	23 - 13	Stockport
	Report

Ferens Ground
Attendance: 210
Referee: Fergus Kirby

19 November 2011
14:00

Nuneaton	20 - 5	Otley
	Report

Liberty Way
Attendance: 239
Referee: Rob Warburton

19 November 2011
14:00

(BP) Westoe	40 - 9	Kendal
	Report

Wood Terrace
Attendance: 250
Referee: Andrew Vertigan

19 November 2011
14:15

Bromsgrove	19 - 18	Leicester Lions (BP)
	Report

Finstall Park
Attendance: 327
Referee: David Procter

19 November 2011
14:15

Luctonians	9 - 28	Huddersfield (BP)
	Report

Mortimer Park
Attendance: 467
Referee: Mark Liddell

19 November 2011
14:15

Sheffield Tigers	19 - 29	Caldy (BP)
	Report

Dore Moor
Attendance: 140
Referee: John Healy

19 November 2011
14:30

Preston Grasshoppers	18 - 29	Hull Ionians (BP)
	Report

Lightfoot Green
Attendance: 521
Referee: Matthew Daubney

=== Round 14 ===
26 November 2011
14:00

(BP) Hull Ionians	12 - 16	Stockport
	Report

Brantingham Park
Attendance: 250
Referee: Tom Foley

26 November 2011
14:00

(BP) Kendal	10 - 12	Sheffield Tigers
	Report

Mint Bridge
Attendance: 300
Referee: Matthew Daubney

26 November 2011
14:00

Leicester Lions	11 - 30	Westoe (BP)
	Report

Westleigh Park
Attendance: 100
Referee: Luke Haskins

26 November 2011
14:00

Loughborough Students	25 - 14	Luctonians
	Report

Loughborough University Stadium
Attendance: 412

26 November 2011
14:15

(BP) Bromsgrove	39 - 13	Hull
	Report

Finstall Park
Referee: D Edmunds

26 November 2011
14:15

Caldy	22 - 21	Harrogate (BP)
	Report

Paton Field
Attendance: 161
Referee: Mark Liddell

26 November 2011
14:15

(BP) Otley	17 - 20	Preston Grasshoppers
	Report

Cross Green
Attendance: 257
Referee: Andy Rawson

26 November 2011
16:00

Huddersfield	27 - 17	Nuneaton
	Report

Lockwood Park
Attendance: 412
Referee: Andrew Vertigan

=== Round 15 ===
3 December 2011
14:00

(BP) Harrogate	22 - 13	Kendal
	Report

Claro Road
Attendance: 200
Referee: Wayne Falla

3 December 2011
14:00

(BP) Hull	17 - 24	Hull Ionians
	Report

Ferens Ground
Attendance: 350
Referee: Andrew Vertigan

3 December 2011
14:00

Nuneaton	10 - 50	Loughborough Students (BP)
	Report

Liberty Way
Attendance: 243
Referee: Tom Foley

3 December 2011
14:00

Westoe	24 - 21	Bromsgrove (BP)
	Report

Wood Terrace
Attendance: 177
Referee: Matthew Daubney

3 December 2011
14:15

(BP) Luctonians	24 - 20	Caldy (BP)
	Report

Mortimer Park
Attendance: 370
Referee: John Healy

3 December 2011
14:15

Sheffield Tigers	17 - 6	Leicester Lions
	Report

Dore Moor
Attendance: 150
Referee: Phil Watters

3 December 2011
14:15

(BP) Stockport	31 - 0	Otley
	Report

The Memorial Ground
Attendance: 121
Referee: Craig Maxwell Keys

3 December 2011
14:30

(BP) Preston Grasshoppers	10 - 17	Huddersfield
	Report

Lightfoot Green
Attendance: 277
Referee: Brendan Fitzmaurice

=== Round 16 ===
10 December 2011
14:00

(BP) Hull	27 - 5	Otley
	Report

Ferens Ground
Attendance: 220
Referee: Graham Dickens

10 December 2011
14:00

Kendal	12 - 10	Nuneaton (BP)
	Report

Mint Bridge
Attendance: 300
Referee: Brendan Fitzmaurice

10 December 2011
14:00

(BP) Leicester Lions	15 - 22	Luctonians
	Report

Westleigh Park
Attendance: 150
Referee: Mike Cooper

10 December 2011
14:00

(BP) Loughborough Students	36 - 10	Stockport
	Report

Loughborough University Stadium
Attendance: 375
Referee: G Evans

10 December 2011
14:00

(BP) Westoe	29 - 21	Sheffield Tigers
	Report

Wood Terrace
Attendance: 101
Referee: Will Halford

10 December 2011
14:15

(BP) Bromsgrove	41 - 15	Harrogate
	Report

Finstall Park
Attendance: 250
Referee: Alex Manley

10 December 2011
14:15

(BP) Caldy	18 - 20	Preston Grasshoppers
	Report

Paton Field
Attendance: 121
Referee: Marcus Caton

10 December 2011
15:00

Huddersfield	6 - 3	Hull Ionians (BP)
	Report

Lockwood Park
Attendance: 362
Referee: Karl Kirkpatrick

=== Round 17 ===
17 December 2011
14:00

Harrogate	10 - 40	Westoe (BP)
	Report

Claro Road
Attendance: 180
Referee: Guy Steel Bodger

17 December 2011
14:00

(BP) Hull Ionians	18 - 24	Loughborough Students
	Report

Brantingham Park
Attendance: 200
Referee: David Procter

17 December 2011
14:00

Nuneaton	26 - 10	Leicester Lions
	Report

Liberty Way
Attendance: 136
Referee: Philip Davis

17 December 2011
14:00

Otley	12 - 39	Huddersfield (BP)
	Report

Cross Green
Attendance: 359
Referee: Andrew Jackson

17 December 2011
14:15

Luctonians	17 - 5	Bromsgrove
	Report

Mortimer Park
Attendance: 585
Referee: Shane Lewis

17 December 2011
14:15

(BP) Sheffield Tigers	35 - 10	Hull
	Report

Dore Moor
Attendance: 110
Referee: Wayne Falla

17 December 2011
14:15

Stockport	18 - 14	Caldy (BP)
	Report

The Memorial Ground
Attendance: 123
Referee: Matthew Daubney

17 December 2011
14:30

Preston Grasshoppers	23 - 16	Kendal (BP)
	Report

Lightfoot Green
Attendance: 614
Referee: Andrew Vertigan

=== Round 18 ===
7 January 2012
14:00

Hull	15 - 13	Huddersfield (BP)
	Report

Ferens Ground
Attendance: 280
Referee: James Sullivan

7 January 2012
14:00

Kendal	18 - 17	Stockport (BP)
	Report

Mint Bridge
Attendance: 250
Referee: Will Halford

7 January 2012
14:00

(2BP) Leicester Lions	36 - 38	Preston Grasshoppers (BP)
	Report

Westleigh Park
Attendance: 120
Referee: Andrew Vertigan

7 January 2012
14:00

(BP) Loughborough Students	33 - 18	Otley
	Report

Loughborough University Stadium
Attendance: 180

7 January 2012
14:00

Westoe	14 - 0	Luctonians
	Report

Wood Terrace
Attendance: 133
Referee: D Edmunds

7 January 2012
14:15

Caldy	27 - 17	Hull Ionians
	Report

Paton Field
Attendance: 131
Referee: Mark Liddell

7 January 2012
14:15

Sheffield Tigers	20 - 7	Harrogate
	Report

Dore Moor
Attendance: 150
Referee: Mike Cooper

7 January 2012
15:00

Bromsgrove	25 - 8	Nuneaton
	Report

Finstall Park
Referee: Matthew Daubney

=== Round 19 ===
14 January 2012
14:00

(BP) Hull Ionians	39 - 14	Kendal
	Report

Brantingham Park
Attendance: 200
Referee: Guy Steel Bodger

14 January 2012
14:00

Nuneaton	18 - 14	Westoe (BP)
	Report

Liberty Way
Attendance: 177
Referee: Rob Warburton

14 January 2012
14:00

Otley	20 - 35	Caldy (BP)
	Report

Cross Green
Referee: Andrew Vertigan

14 January 2012
14:15

Stockport	27 - 18	Leicester Lions
	Report

The Memorial Ground
Attendance: 125
Referee: Brendan Fitzmaurice

14 January 2012
14:30

(BP) Preston Grasshoppers	32 - 19	Bromsgrove
	Report

Lightfoot Green
Attendance: 321
Referee: Craig Maxwell Keys

14 January 2012

Harrogate	P - P	Hull

- Postponed. Game rescheduled to 4 February 2012.

14 January 2012

Huddersfield	P - P	Loughborough Students

- Postponed. Game rescheduled to 4 February 2012.

14 January 2012

Luctonians	P - P	Sheffield Tigers

- Postponed. Game rescheduled to 4 February 2012.

=== Round 20 ===
21 January 2012
14:00

(BP) Harrogate	16 - 19	Luctonians
	Report

Claro Road
Attendance: 150
Referee: Alex Manley

21 January 2012
14:00

Hull	3 - 20	Loughborough Students
	Report

Ferens Ground
Attendance: 180
Referee: Karl Kirkpatrick

21 January 2012
14:00

(BP) Kendal	5 - 11	Otley
	Report

Mint Bridge
Attendance: 240
Referee: Matthew Daubney

21 January 2012
14:00

(BP) Leicester Lions	11 - 16	Hull Ionians
	Report

Westleigh Park
Attendance: 100
Referee: David Procter

21 January 2012
14:00

Sheffield Tigers	8 - 3	Nuneaton
	Report

Dore Moor
Attendance: 125
Referee: D Edmunds

21 January 2012
14:00

(BP) Westoe	37 - 6	Preston Grasshoppers
	Report

Wood Terrace
Attendance: 166
Referee: Brendan Fitzmaurice

21 January 2012
14:15

Bromsgrove	23 - 10	Stockport
	Report

Finstall Park
Attendance: 247
Referee: Mark Liddell

21 January 2012
14:15

(BP) Caldy	10 - 12	Huddersfield
	Report

Paton Field
Attendance: 151
Referee: Wayne Falla

=== Round 21 ===
28 January 2012
14:00

(BP) Hull Ionians	34 - 32	Bromsgrove (2BP)
	Report

Brantingham Park
Attendance: 200
Referee: Andrew Vertigan

28 January 2012
14:00

(BP) Loughborough Students	57 - 17	Caldy
	Report

Loughborough University Stadium
Attendance: 382

28 January 2012
14:00

(BP) Nuneaton	21 - 27	Harrogate (BP)
	Report

Liberty Way
Attendance: 163
Referee: Tom Foley

28 January 2012
14:00

(BP) Otley	22 - 22	Leicester Lions
	Report

Cross Green
Attendance: 364
Referee: Ed Turnill

28 January 2012
14:15

Luctonians	18 - 29	Hull
	Report

Mortimer Park
Attendance: 368
Referee: Craig Maxwell Keys

28 January 2012
14:15

(BP) Stockport	33 - 22	Westoe
	Report

The Memorial Ground
Attendance: 125
Referee: Guy Steel Bodger

28 January 2012
14:30

Preston Grasshoppers	21 - 31	Sheffield Tigers (BP)
	Report

Lightfoot Green
Attendance: 325
Referee: Brendan Fitzmaurice

28 January 2012
15:00

(BP) Huddersfield	40 - 7	Kendal
	Report

Lockwood Park
Attendance: 205
Referee: Fergus Kirby

=== Round 19 (rescheduled games) ===
4 February 2012

Harrogate	P - P	Hull

- Initially rescheduled from 14 January 2012 but postponed again. Game rescheduled to 25 February 2012.

4 February 2012

Huddersfield	P - P	Loughborough Students

- Initially rescheduled from 14 January 2012 but postponed again. Game rescheduled to 25 February 2012.

4 February 2012

Luctonians	P - P	Sheffield Tigers

- Initially rescheduled from 4 February 2012 but postponed again. Game rescheduled to 25 February 2012.

=== Round 22 ===
11 February 2012
14:15

(BP) Luctonians	35 - 3	Nuneaton
	Report

Mortimer Park
Attendance: 330
Referee: Fergus Kirby

11 February 2012

Bromsgrove	P - P	Otley

- Postponed. Game rescheduled to 25 February 2012.

11 February 2012

Harrogate	P - P	Preston Grasshoppers

- Postponed. Game rescheduled to ?.

11 February 2012

Hull	P - P	Caldy

- Postponed. Game rescheduled to ?.

11 February 2012

Kendal	P - P	Loughborough Students

- Postponed. Game rescheduled to ?.

11 February 2012

Leicester Lions	P - P	Huddersfield

- Postponed. Game rescheduled to ?.

11 February 2012

Sheffield Tigers	P - P	Stockport

- Postponed. Game rescheduled to ?.

11 February 2012

Westoe	P - P	Hull Ionians

- Postponed. Game rescheduled to 25 February 2012.

=== Round 23 ===
18 February 2012
14:00

(BP) Hull Ionians	30 - 23	Sheffield Tigers (BP)
	Report

Brantingham Park
Attendance: 220
Referee: Andrew Vertigan

18 February 2012
14:00

Loughborough Students	17 - 26	Leicester Lions
	Report

Loughborough University Stadium
Attendance: 422

18 February 2012
14:00

Nuneaton	3 - 15	Hull
	Report

Liberty Way
Attendance: 263
Referee: Simon McConnell

18 February 2012
14:15

(BP) Caldy	59 - 7	Kendal
	Report

Paton Field
Attendance: 131
Referee: Fergus Kirby

18 February 2012
14:15

Otley	13 - 12	Westoe (BP)
	Report

Cross Green
Attendance: 263
Referee: Craig Maxwell Keys

18 February 2012
14:15

(BP) Stockport	14 - 15	Harrogate
	Report

The Memorial Ground
Attendance: 132
Referee: Guy Steel Bodger

18 February 2012
14:30

(BP) Preston Grasshoppers	39 - 5	Luctonians
	Report

Lightfoot Green
Attendance: 412
Referee: Richard Harding

18 February 2012
15:00

(BP) Huddersfield	10 - 16	Bromsgrove
	Report

Lockwood Park
Attendance: 250
Referee: Philip Davis

=== Rounds 19 & 22 (rescheduled games) ===
25 February 2012
14:00

(BP) Harrogate	25 - 34	Hull (BP)
	Report

Claro Road
Attendance: 180
Referee: K White

- Game rescheduled from 4 February 2012.

25 February 2012
14:00

(BP) Westoe	13 - 16	Hull Ionians
	Report

Wood Terrace
Attendance: 101
Referee: Wayne Falla

- Game rescheduled from 11 February 2012.

25 February 2012
14:15

(BP) Bromsgrove	52 - 32	Otley (BP)
	Report

Finstall Park
Referee: Morgan Whitehead

- Game rescheduled from 11 February 2012.

25 February 2012
14:15

Luctonians	22 - 15	Sheffield Tigers (BP)
	Report

Mortimer Park
Attendance: 330
Referee: D Edmunds

- Game rescheduled from 4 February 2012.

25 February 2012
15:00

Huddersfield	10 - 36	Loughborough Students (BP)
	Report

Lockwood Park
Attendance: 241
Referee: Will Halford

- Game rescheduled from 4 February 2012.

=== Round 24 ===
3 March 2012
14:00

(BP) Leicester Lions	18 - 23	Caldy
	Report

Westleigh Park
Attendance: 100
Referee: Nick Williams

3 March 2012
14:00

Westoe	31 - 21	Huddersfield
	Report

Wood Terrace
Attendance: 184
Referee: Brendan Fitzmaurice

3 March 2012
14:15

Luctonians	17 - 8	Stockport
	Report

Mortimer Park
Attendance: 386
Referee: Tom Foley

3 March 2012
14:30

Nuneaton	20 - 20	Preston Grasshoppers
	Report

Liberty Way
Attendance: 145
Referee: Andrew Vertigan

3 March 2012
15:00

Bromsgrove	23 - 23	Loughborough Students
	Report

Finstall Park
Attendance: 511
Referee: Lloyd Linton

3 March 2012
15:00

(BP) Harrogate	28 - 8	Hull Ionians
	Report

Claro Road
Attendance: 180
Referee: Guy Steel Bodger

3 March 2012
15:00

(BP) Hull	28 - 19	Kendal
	Report

Ferens Ground
Attendance: 160
Referee: Will Halford

3 March 2012
15:00

(BP) Sheffield Tigers	24 - 19	Otley (BP)
	Report

Dore Moor
Attendance: 144
Referee: Marcus Caton

=== Round 25 ===
10 March 2012
14:00

(BP) Hull Ionians	29 - 24	Luctonians (2BP)
	Report

Brantingham Park
Attendance: 250
Referee: Mark Liddell

10 March 2012
14:00

(BP) Loughborough Students	34 - 5	Westoe
	Report

Loughborough University Stadium
Attendance: 527
Referee: Andrew Jackson

10 March 2012
14:30

(2BP) Preston Grasshoppers	29 - 36	Hull (BP)
	Report

Lightfoot Green
Attendance: 235
Referee: Will Halford

10 March 2012
15:00

(BP) Caldy	32 - 24	Bromsgrove (2BP)
	Report

Paton Field
Attendance: 259
Referee: Guy Steel Bodger

10 March 2012
15:00

Huddersfield	22 - 20	Sheffield Tigers (BP)
	Report

Lockwood Park
Attendance: 273
Referee: Mike Cooper

10 March 2012
15:00

(2BP) Kendal	32 - 36	Leicester Lions (BP)
	Report

Mint Bridge
Attendance: 285
Referee: Andrew Vertigan

10 March 2012
15:00

(BP) Otley	25 - 11	Harrogate
	Report

Cross Green
Attendance: 526
Referee: Matthew Daubney

10 March 2012
15:00

(BP) Stockport	43 - 13	Nuneaton
	Report

The Memorial Ground
Attendance: 131
Referee: D Edmunds

=== Round 22 (rescheduled games) ===
17 March 2012
14:00

Leicester Lions	18 - 18	Huddersfield
	Report

Westleigh Park
Attendance: 100
Referee: James Sullivan

- Game rescheduled from 11 February 2012.

17 March 2012
14:00

Sheffield Tigers	25 - 16	Stockport
	Report

Dore Moor
Attendance: 105
Referee: Philip Davis

- Game rescheduled from 11 February 2012.

17 March 2012
14:15

(BP) Hull	44 - 10	Caldy
	Report

Ferens Ground
Attendance: 230
Referee: Karl Kirkpatrick

- Game rescheduled from 11 February 2012.

17 March 2012
14:30

Harrogate	18 - 47	Preston Grasshoppers (BP)
	Report

Claro Road
Attendance: 150
Referee: Marcus Caton

- Game rescheduled from 11 February 2012.

17 March 2012
15:00

Kendal	5 - 40	Loughborough Students (BP)
	Report

Mint Bridge
Attendance: 240
Referee: Matthew Daubney

- Game rescheduled from 11 February 2012.

=== Round 26 ===
24 March 2015
14:00

(BP) Bromsgrove	67 - 6	Kendal
	Report

Finstall Park
Attendance: 603
Referee: David Procter

24 March 2015
14:00

Nuneaton	22 - 41	Hull Ionians (BP)
	Report

Liberty Way
Attendance: 190
Referee: Brendan Fitzmaurice

24 March 2015
14:00

Westoe	6 - 47	Caldy (BP)
	Report

Wood Terrace
Attendance: 167
Referee: Lloyd Linton

24 March 2015
14:30

Luctonians	12 - 10	Otley (BP)
	Report

Mortimer Park
Attendance: 278
Referee: D Edmunds

24 March 2015
14:30

(BP) Preston Grasshoppers	29 - 13	Stockport
	Report

Lightfoot Green
Attendance: 364
Referee: Simone Colantonio

24 March 2015
15:00

Harrogate	17 - 17	Huddersfield
	Report

Claro Road
Attendance: 260
Referee: Will Halford

24 March 2015
15:00

(BP) Hull	34 - 19	Leicester Lions
	Report

Ferens Ground
Attendance: 190
Referee: Andrew Vertigan

24 March 2015
15:00

(BP) Sheffield Tigers	16 - 22	Loughborough Students
	Report

Dore Moor
Attendance: 225
Referee: Mark Liddell

=== Round 27 ===
31 March 2012
14:00

(BP) Leicester Lions	33 - 29	Bromsgrove (2BP)
	Report

Westleigh Park
Attendance: 150
Referee: Rowan Kitt

31 March 2012
14:00

Loughborough Students	17 - 16	Harrogate (BP)
	Report

Loughborough University Stadium
Attendance: 250

31 March 2012
15:00

(BP) Caldy	37 - 9	Sheffield Tigers
	Report

Paton Field
Attendance: 201
Referee: Matthew Daubney

31 March 2012
15:00

Huddersfield	9 - 30	Luctonians (BP)
	Report

Lockwood Park
Attendance: 222
Referee: Keith Lewis

31 March 2012
15:00

Hull Ionians	17 - 27	Preston Grasshoppers (BP)
	Report

Brantingham Park
Attendance: 250
Referee: David Procter

31 March 2012
15:00

(BP) Kendal	26 - 33	Westoe (BP)
	Report

Mint Bridge
Attendance: 295
Referee: Brendan Fitzmaurice

31 March 2012
15:00

(BP) Otley	39 - 22	Nuneaton
	Report

Cross Green
Attendance: 397
Referee: Andrew Vertigan

31 March 2012
15:00

Stockport	16 - 43	Hull (BP)
	Report

The Memorial Ground
Attendance: 120
Referee: Mark Liddell

=== Round 28 ===
14 April 2012
14:00

Nuneaton	25 - 24	Huddersfield (2BP)
	Report

Liberty Way
Attendance: 175
Referee: Steve Savage

14 April 2012
14:00

Westoe	21 - 34	Leicester Lions (BP)
	Report

Wood Terrace
Attendance: 201
Referee: Matthew Daubney

14 April 2012
14:30

(BP) Preston Grasshoppers	90 - 5	Otley
	Report

Lightfoot Green
Attendance: 432
Referee: Graham Dickens

14 April 2012
15:00

Harrogate	25 - 24	Caldy (2BP)
	Report

Claro Road
Attendance: 250
Referee: Andrew Vertigan

14 April 2012
15:00

(BP) Hull	24 - 23	Bromsgrove (2BP)
	Report

Ferens Ground
Attendance: 155
Referee: D Edmunds

14 April 2012
15:00

(BP) Luctonians	17 - 18	Loughborough Students
	Report

Mortimer Park
Attendance: 780
Referee: Tom Williams

14 April 2012
15:00

Sheffield Tigers	24 - 13	Kendal
	Report

Dore Moor
Attendance: 120
Referee: Brendan McGaffney

14 April 2012
15:00

(BP) Stockport	19 - 22	Hull Ionians
	Report

The Memorial Ground
Attendance: 135

=== Round 29 ===
20 April 2012
20:00

(BP) Loughborough Students	39 - 8	Nuneaton
	Report

Loughborough University Stadium
Attendance: 1,214
Referee: Will Halford

21 April 2012
14:00

Leicester Lions	17 - 10	Sheffield Tigers (BP)
	Report

Westleigh Park
Attendance: 125
Referee: Mike Cooper

21 April 2012
15:00

(BP) Bromsgrove	85 - 7	Westoe
	Report

Finstall Park
Attendance: 1,000

21 April 2012
15:00

(BP) Caldy	51 - 23	Luctonians
	Report

Paton Field
Attendance: 342
Referee: John Healy

21 April 2012
15:00

(BP) Huddersfield	34 - 31	Preston Grasshoppers (2BP)
	Report

Lockwood Park
Attendance: 208
Referee: Tom Foley

21 April 2012
15:00

(BP) Hull Ionians	22 - 16	Hull (BP)
	Report

Ferens Ground
Attendance: 450
Referee: Andrew Taylorson

21 April 2012
15:00

(BP) Kendal	15 - 21	Harrogate
	Report

Mint Bridge
Attendance: 250
Referee: Brendan Fitzmaurice

21 April 2012
15:00

(BP) Otley	32 - 27	Stockport (2BP)
	Report

Cross Green
Attendance: 278
Referee: Matthew Daubney

=== Round 30 ===
28 April 2012
14:00

Nuneaton	22 - 8	Caldy
	Report

Liberty Way
Attendance: 247
Referee: Rowan Kitt

28 April 2012
14:00

Sheffield Tigers	16 - 8	Bromsgrove
	Report

Dore Moor
Referee: Steve Lee

28 April 2012
14:30

(BP) Preston Grasshoppers	55 - 13	Loughborough Students
	Report

Lightfoot Green
Attendance: 425
Referee: Mark Liddell

28 April 2012
15:00

Harrogate	25 - 21	Leicester Lions (BP)
	Report

Claro Road
Attendance: 650
Referee: John Meredith

28 April 2012
15:00

Huddersfield	6 - 17	Stockport
	Report

Lockwood Park
Attendance: 221
Referee: Will Halford

28 April 2012
15:00

(2BP) Hull Ionians	38 - 39	Otley (BP)
	Report

Brantingham Park
Attendance: 250
Referee: Andrew Vertigan

28 April 2012
15:00

(BP) Luctonians	90 - 20	Kendal
	Report

Mortimer Park
Attendance: 376

28 April 2012
15:00

Westoe	12 - 55	Hull (BP)
	Report

Wood Terrace
Attendance: 127
Referee: Brendan Fitzmaurice

=== Promotion play-off ===
Each season, the runners-up in the National League 2 North and National League 2 South participate in a play-off for promotion into National League 1. Richmond were runners-up in the South and would host the game as they had a better record in the league in comparison to the North runners up Caldy.

5 May 2012
15:00

Richmond	20 - 13 (a.e.t.)	Caldy

Richmond Athletic Ground
Attendance: 1,600
Referee: Terry Hall

== Total season attendances ==
Club	Home Games	Total	Average	Highest	Lowest	% Capacity
Bromsgrove	12 (Note: Missing home attendances v Hull on 26 November 2011, Nuneaton on 7 January 2012 and Otley on 25 February 2012.)	4,671	389	1,000	190	
Caldy	15	2,920	195	429	113	5%
Harrogate	15	3,590	239	650	130	5%
Huddersfield	15	4,064	271	412	171	18%
Hull	14 (Note: Missing home attendance v Sheffield Tigers on 10 September 2011.)	2,840	203	350	140	14%
Hull Ionians	15	3,670	245	450	150	16%
Kendal	14 (Note: Missing home attendance v Huddersfield on 8 October 2011.)	4,043	289	400	240	6%
Leicester Lions	14 (Note: Missing home attendance v Nuneaton on 10 September 2011.)	1,803	129	245	100	6%
Loughborough Students	15	5,850	390	1,214	100	13%
Luctonians	15	6,446	430	780	278	20%
Nuneaton	15	2,891	193	263	136	5%
Otley	14 (Note: Missing home attendance v Caldy on 14 January 2012.)	4,743	339	526	257	5%
Preston Grasshoppers	15	5,298	353	614	175	16%
Sheffield Tigers	14 (Note: Missing home attendance v Bromsgrove on 28 April 2012.)	2,099	150	225	105	15%
Stockport	15	2,200	147	303	120	29%
Westoe	15	2,421	161	250	101	

== Individual statistics ==
- Note that points scorers includes tries as well as conversions, penalties and drop goals.

=== Top points scorers ===
Rank	Player	Team	Appearances	Points
1	(England) Chris Johnson	Huddersfield	30	362
2	(England) Stuart Hall	Loughborough Students	25	291
3	(England) James Cameron	Hull	24	232
4	(England) Graham Holroyd	Preston Grasshoppers	22	195
5	(England) Jonathan West	Sheffield Tigers	28	192
6	(England) Joshua Longmore	Stockport	28	191
7	(England) Mark Ireland	Kendal	23	179
8	(England) John Morris	Luctonians	26	177
9	(England) Lee Chapman	Nuneaton	23	173
10	(Wales) Gavin Roberts	Caldy	24	163

=== Top try scorers ===
Rank	Player	Team	Appearances	Tries
1	(England) Craig Holland	Loughborough Students	28	27
2	(England) Dominic Moon	Preston Grasshoppers	28	21
3	(England) Jamie Broadley	Sheffield Tigers	30	20
4	(England) Elliot Brown	Nuneaton	26	19
5	(England) Paul Hulland	Luctonians	27	18
5	(England) Tommy Banks	Westoe	28	18
6	(England) Matthew Hughes	Preston Grasshoppers	22	17
7	(Wales) Gavin Roberts	Caldy	24	16
7	(England) James Twomey	Otley	26	16
8	(England) Nigel Burrows	Bromsgrove	24	15
8	(England) Nicholas Smith	Stockport	26	15
8	(England) Jesiah Dickinson	Caldy	29	15

== Season records ==
=== Team ===
Largest home win — 85 pts

90 - 5 Preston Grasshoppers at home to Otley on 14 April 2012

Largest away win — 40 pts

50 - 10 Loughborough Students away to Nuneaton on 3 December 2011

Most points scored — 90 pts (x2)

90 - 5 Preston Grasshoppers at home to Otley on 14 April 2012
90 - 20 Luctonians at home to Kendal on 28 April 2012

Most tries in a match — 14 (x2)

Preston Grasshoppers at home to Otley on 14 April 2012
Luctonians at home to Kendal on 28 April 2012

Most conversions in a match — 10 (x3)

Preston Grasshoppers at home to Otley on 14 April 2012
Bromsgrove at home to Westoe on 21 April 2012
Luctonians at home to Kendal on 28 April 2012

Most penalties in a match — 6 (x2)

Preston Grasshoppers away to Sheffield Tigers on 8 October 2011
Harrogate at home to Leicester Lions on 28 April 2012

Most drop goals in a match — 2

Nuneaton at home to Caldy on 27 August 2011

=== Player ===
Most points in a match — 35

(England) Dominic Moon for Preston Grasshoppers at home to Otley on 14 April 2012

Most tries in a match — 7

(England) Dominic Moon for Preston Grasshoppers at home to Otley on 14 April 2012

Most conversions in a match — 10 (x2)

(England) Nathan Fowles for Preston Grasshoppers at home to Otley on 14 April 2012
(England) Ben Copson for Bromsgrove at home to Westoe on 21 April 2012

Most penalties in a match — 6 (x2)

(England) Graham Holroyd for Preston Grasshoppers away to Sheffield Tigers on 8 October 2011
(England) Jack Latus for Harrogate at home to Leicester Lions on 28 April 2012

Most drop goals in a match — 2

(England) Lee Chapman for Nuneaton at home to Caldy on 27 August 2011

=== Attendances ===
Highest — 1,214

Loughborough Students at home to Nuneaton on 20 April 2012

Lowest — 100 (x7)

Loughborough Students at home to Huddersfield on 24 September 2011
Leicester Lions at home to Otley on 8 October 2011
Leicester Lions at home to Kendal on 5 November 2011
Leicester Lions at home to Westoe on 26 November 2011
Leicester Lions at home to Hull Ionians on 21 January 2012
Leicester Lions at home to Caldy on 3 March 2012
Leicester Lions at home to Huddersfield on 17 March 2012

Highest Average Attendance — 430

Luctonians

Lowest Average Attendance — 129

Leicester Lions

== See also ==
- English Rugby Union Leagues
- English rugby union system
- Rugby union in England
