= WRU Division One North =

Welsh rugby union league

- Founded: 1995
- No. of teams: 10
- Country: Wales
- Most recent champion: Nant Conwy RFC (2017–18)
- Level on pyramid: 2
- Promotion to: Top tier
- Relegation to: WRU Division Two North
- Website: www.wru.co.uk/eng/club/swalecleagues/latest_news.php

The Welsh Rugby Union Division One North (also called the SWALEC Division One North for sponsorship reasons) is a rugby union league in Wales first implemented for the 1995/96 season. The league was known as Division Four North before the 2008-09 season. Division One North, Two North and Three North are self-contained leagues within the larger Swalec leagues, and clubs can not be promoted to or demoted from the two leagues.

== Competition format and sponsorship ==
=== Competition ===
There are 12 clubs in the WRU Division One North. During the course of a season (which lasts from September to April) each club plays the others twice, once at their home ground and once at that of their opponents for a total of 22 games for each club, with a total of 132 games in each season. Teams receive four points for a win and two point for a draw, an additional bonus point is awarded to either team if they score four tries or more in a single match. No points are awarded for a loss though the losing team can gain a bonus point for finishing the match within seven points of the winning team. Teams are ranked by total points, then the number of tries scored and then points difference. At the end of each season, the club with the most points is crowned as champion. If points are equal the tries scored then points difference determines the winner. The team who is declared champion at the end of the season but is not allowed promotion out of the Division One North league. The two lowest placed teams are relegated into the WRU Division Two North.

=== Sponsorship ===
In 2008 the Welsh Rugby Union announced a new sponsorship deal for the club rugby leagues with SWALEC. The sponsorship is a three-year deal that will continue until the 2010/11 season at a cost of £1 million (GBP). The leagues sponsored are the WRU Divisions one through to six.

- (2002-2005) Lloyds TSB
- (2005-2008) Asda
- (2008-2011) SWALEC

== 2017/2018 season ==
=== League teams ===
- Bala RFC
- Bro Ffestiniog RFC
- Dolgellau RFC
- Colwyn Bay RFC
- Caernarfon RFC
- Bethesda RFC
- Llandudno RFC
- Llangefni RFC
- Mold RFC
- Nant Conwy RFC
- Pwllheli RFC
- Ruthin RFC

=== 2017/2018 Table ===
2017-2018 WRU Division One North League Table
	Club	Played	Won	Drawn	Lost	Points for	Points against	Tries for	Tries against	Try bonus	Losing bonus	Points
1	Nant Conwy RFC	22	21	0	1	942	275	141	37	16	1	101
2	Pwllheli RFC	22	19	0	3	752	311	116	39	11	1	88
3	Bala RFC	22	18	0	4	644	273	87	35	12	3	87
4	Llandudno RFC	22	15	0	7	522	320	73	41	10	3	73
5	Mold RFC	22	10	0	12	344	251	50	30	3	6	55
6	Llangefni RFC	22	10	0	12	242	318	30	40	2	3	48
7	Ruthin RFC	22	9	0	13	271	450	28	63	0	0	44
8	Bethesda RFC	22	9	0	13	311	346	39	50	2	5	43
9	Caernarfon RFC	22	7	1	14	247	416	31	55	2	4	43
10	Bro Festiniog RFC	22	8	0	14	204	711	25	106	0	1	37
11	Dolgellau RFC	22	4	1	17	247	416	31	55	2	4	27
12	Colwyn Bay RFC	22	1	0	21	204	711	25	106	0	1	6
Only ‘Pl’ ‘W’ ‘D’ ‘L’ and ‘PTS’ are correct

== 2011/2012 season ==
=== League teams ===
- Bala RFC
- Bro Ffestiniog RFC
- Caernarfon RFC
- Bethesda RFC
- Llandudno RFC
- Llangefni RFC
- Mold RFC
- Nant Conwy RFC
- Pwllheli RFC
- Ruthin RFC

=== 2011/2012 Table ===
2011-2012 WRU Division One North League Table
	Club	Played	Won	Drawn	Lost	Points for	Points against	Tries for	Tries against	Try bonus	Losing bonus	Points
1	Caernarfon RFC	18	15	0	3	524	249	72	32	8	1	69
2	Nant Conwy RFC	18	14	0	4	427	177	62	19	6	2	64
3	Bro Ffestiniog RFC	18	13	0	5	437	246	62	30	6	5	63
4	Bethesda RFC	18	12	0	6	365	208	47	21	5	5	58
5	Pwllheli RFC	18	9	0	9	344	251	50	30	3	6	45
6	Bala RFC	18	7	0	11	242	318	30	40	2	3	33
7	Llangefni RFC	18	8	0	10	271	450	28	63	0	0	32
8	Ruthin RFC	18	6	0	12	311	346	39	50	2	5	31
9	Mold RFC	18	4	0	14	247	416	31	55	2	4	22
10	Llandudno RFC	18	2	0	16	204	711	25	106	0	1	9
Correct as of 26 May 2012

== 2010/2011 season ==
=== League teams ===
- Bro Ffestiniog RFC
- Caernarfon RFC
- Colwyn Bay RFC
- Bethesda RFC
- Llandudno RFC
- Llangefni RFC
- Mold RFC
- Nant Conwy RFC
- Pwllheli RFC
- Ruthin RFC

=== 2010/2011 Table ===
2010-2011 WRU Division One North League Table
	Club	Played	Won	Drawn	Lost	Points for	Points against	Tries for	Tries against	Try bonus	Losing bonus	Points
1	Caernarfon RFC	18	17	0	1	663	275	91	35	12	1	81
2	Nant Conwy RFC	18	12	0	6	451	322	67	33	8	5	61
3	Bethesda RFC	18	13	0	5	368	333	48	43	5	2	59
4	Mold RFC	18	11	0	7	366	348	48	42	4	4	52
5	Llandudno RFC	18	9	0	9	409	456	56	63	4	6	46
6	Bro Ffestiniog RFC	18	8	0	10	394	367	49	44	5	3	40
7	Ruthin RFC	18	7	0	11	335	325	41	46	4	6	38
8	Llangefni RFC	18	6	0	12	248	426	20	62	1	4	29
9	Pwllheli RFC	18	4	0	14	273	417	35	52	1	6	23
10	Colwyn Bay RFC	18	3	0	15	223	461	26	61	2	6	20
Correct as of 26 May 2012

== 2009/2010 season ==
=== League teams ===
- Bro Ffestiniog RFC
- Caernarfon RFC
- Colwyn Bay RFC
- Denbigh RFC
- Llandudno RFC
- Llangefni RFC
- Mold RFC
- Nant Conwy RFC
- Pwllheli RFC
- Ruthin RFC

=== 2009/2010 Table ===
2009-2010 WRU Division One North League Table
Club	Played	Won	Drawn	Lost	Points for	Points against	Tries for	Tries against	Try bonus	Losing bonus	Points
Nant Conwy RFC	18	17	0	1	578	183	83	19	11	1	80
Caernarfon RFC	18	17	0	1	570	179	81	21	11	0	79
Mold RFC	18	11	0	7	471	349	63	46	8	3	55
Pwllheli RFC	18	10	0	8	479	338	66	42	7	4	51
Bro Ffestiniog RFC	18	9	0	9	346	457	52	63	5	2	43
Ruthin RFC	18	8	1	9	352	381	49	46	4	1	39
Colwyn Bay RFC	18	5	1	12	293	402	37	55	4	5	31
Llandudno RFC	18	4	2	12	266	536	30	79	2	4	26
Llangefni RFC	18	4	0	14	267	423	27	58	3	5	24
Denbigh RFC	18	3	0	15	204	578	24	83	1	3	16
Correct as of 3 August 2010

== 2008/2009 season ==
=== League teams ===
- Bala RFC
- Caernarfon RFC
- Colwyn Bay RFC
- Denbigh RFC
- Dolgellau RFC
- Llandudno RFC
- Llangefni RFC
- Llanidloes RFC
- Mold RFC
- Nant Conwy RFC
- Pwllheli RFC
- Ruthin RFC

=== 2008/2009 Table ===
2008-2009 WRU Division Four North League Table
Club	Played	Won	Drawn	Lost	Points for	Points against	Tries for	Tries against	Try bonus	Losing bonus	Points
Nant Conwy RFC	22	19	0	3	647	220	97	29	12	1	89
Ruthin RFC	22	19	1	2	605	266	90	33	11	0	89
Caernarfon RFC	22	18	0	4	680	205	107	25	14	3	89
Llangefni RFC	22	16	0	6	465	260	69	34	9	0	73
Mold RFC	22	13	0	9	481	358	64	46	8	4	64
Llandudno RFC	22	11	0	11	345	513	43	70	4	2	50
Pwllheli RFC	22	9	0	13	350	388	43	54	4	5	45
Denbigh RFC	22	7	1	14	329	438	38	56	3	5	38
Colwyn Bay RFC	22	6	0	16	329	390	39	47	4	10	38
Bala RFC	22	6	0	16	294	431	40	57	2	8	34
Dolgellau RFC	22	4	0	18	218	608	25	86	2	3	21
Llanidloes RFC	22	3	0	19	196	862	19	137	0	1	13
Correct as of 20:14 27 May 2008

== 2007/2008 season ==
=== League teams ===
- Bala RFC
- Caernarfon RFC
- Colwyn Bay RFC
- Denbigh RFC
- Dolgellau RFC
- Llandudno RFC
- Llangefni RFC
- Llanidloes RFC
- Mold RFC
- Nant Conwy RFC
- Newtown RFC
- Ruthin RFC

=== 2007/2008 Table ===
2007-2008 WRU Division Four North League Table
Club	Played	Won	Drawn	Lost	Points for	Points against	Tries for	Tries against	Try bonus	Losing bonus	Points
Caernarfon RFC	22	18	1	3	643	235	101	24	14	1	89
Colwyn Bay RFC	22	18	0	4	570	256	79	29	10	3	85
Nant Conwy RFC	22	16	0	6	585	177	84	21	11	4	79
Mold RFC	22	16	0	6	596	239	85	27	11	3	78
Ruthin RFC	22	15	2	5	599	198	89	21	9	3	76
Llangefni RFC	22	13	0	9	504	311	69	42	9	5	66
Llandudno RFC	22	9	0	13	436	498	59	73	6	3	45
Denbigh RFC	22	7	0	15	348	467	50	69	5	5	38
Bala RFC	22	8	0	14	282	443	37	61	3	2	37
Dolgellau RFC	22	6	1	15	250	538	32	80	3	3	32
Llanidloes RFC	22	2	0	20	171	835	19	128	0	2	10
Newtown RFC	22	2	0	20	109	896	10	139	0	2	10
Correct as of 20:14 27 May 2008

== Winners ==
Season	Winners
2007-08	Caernarfon RFC
2008-09	Nant Conwy RFC
2009-10	Nant Conwy RFC
2010-11	Caernarfon RFC
2011-12	Caernarfon RFC
2012-13	Nant Conwy RFC
2013-14	Bala RFC
2014-15	Pwllheli RFC
2015-16	Pwllheli RFC
2016-17	Pwllheli RFC
2017-18	Nant Conwy RFC
2018-19	Llandudno RFC 2019-20 Nant Conwy 2020-2021 Nant Conwy 2021-2022 Nant Conwy 2023-24 Nant Conwy
