= William Morris (disambiguation) =

William Morris (1834–1896) was a British writer, designer, and socialist.

William, Bill, Willie, or Billy Morris may also refer to:

== Art ==
- W. W. Morris (William Walker Morris, 1832–?), English painter
- William Charles Morris (1874–1940), American cartoonist
- William Morris (glass artist) (born 1957), American glass artist

== Business ==
- William Morris (Canadian businessman) (1786–1858), businessman and political figure in Upper Canada
- William E. Morris (railroad executive), LIRR president from 1853 to 1862; see List of railroad executives
- William Morris (newspaper owner) (1826–1891), founder of the Swindon Advertiser and great-grandfather of Desmond Morris
- William Morris, 1st Viscount Nuffield (1877–1963), British motor manufacturer and philanthropist

== Entertainment ==
- William Morris (actor) (1861–1936), American actor
- William Morris Jr. (1899–1989), American talent agent and president of the William Morris Agency
- Willie Morris (soprano), (born 1907 or 1908), American soprano
- Billy Morris (guitarist), American guitarist

=== Literature ===
- William Morris (archdruid) (1889–1979), writer, archdruid of Wales
- William C. Morris (1928/29–2003), American publisher, namesake of the William C. Morris Award
- Willie Morris (1934–1999), American writer
- Haldreyn (William Morris, born 1937), Cornish poet

== Military ==
- William W. Morris (1801–1865), American Civil War general
- William Morris (British Army officer) (1820–1858), British soldier who rode in the Charge of the Light Brigade
- William H. Morris (1827–1900), American Civil War general
- William Wilkerson Morris (1843–?), American soldier and Medal of Honor recipient
- William Powers Morris (1844–1916), American Civil War Congressional Medal of Honor recipient
- William H. H. Morris Jr. (1890–1971), United States Army general

== Politics, government, and activism ==
- William Morris (Irish mayor), mayor of Galway, 1527–28
- William Morris (Virginia politician) (1746–1802), American politician and soldier
- William Morris (British politician) (1811–1877), Liberal MP for Carmarthen Boroughs, and banker
- William Ridgley Morris (1811–1889), member of the Pennsylvania State Legislature and consul
- William Harrington Morris, mayor of Birmingham, Alabama, 1875–1878
- William R. Morris (1853–1936), second Public Service Commissioner of New Zealand
- William Dowler Morris (1857–1931), mayor of Ottawa
- William Case Morris (1864–1932), British-Argentinian social activist
- Sir Willie Morris (diplomat) (1919–1982), British diplomat
- William S. Morris (1919–1975), Lieutenant Governor of Missouri, 1969–1973
- William Talbert Morris (1924–1993), member of the Kansas state legislature
- Bill Morris (Tennessee politician) (1932–2025), sheriff and mayor of Shelby County, Tennessee
- Bill Morris, Baron Morris of Handsworth (born 1938), Jamaican-born British trade union leader
- Bill Morris (Illinois politician), member of the Illinois Senate and Mayor of Waukegan, Illinois

== Religion ==
- William Placid Morris (1794–1872), British Catholic Vicar Apostolic of the Cape of Good Hope and Mauritius
- William Morris (Baptist minister) (1843–1922), minister in South Wales
- William Perry French Morris (1878–1960), Australian Anglican priest and school headmaster
- William Morris (Irish priest), Dean of Clogher, 1959–1962
- William Morris (Church of Scotland minister) (1925–2013), Church of Scotland minister and author
- Bill Morris (bishop) (born 1943), Roman Catholic Bishop Emeritus of Toowoomba, Australia

== Sports ==
=== Association football (soccer) ===
- Bill Morris (footballer, born 1888) (1888–1949), English footballer
- Billy Morris (soccer), international soccer player, active in United States teams 1922–1931
- Bill Morris (footballer, born 1913) (1913–1995), England international football player
- Billy Morris (footballer, born 1918) (1918–2002), Welsh international football player
- Billy Morris (footballer, born 1920) (1920–1994), Welsh footballer (Swansea Town, Brighton & Hove Albion)

=== Cricket ===
- William Morris (English cricketer) (1873–1945), English cricketer
- Bill Morris (cricketer) (1917–2004), English cricketer
- William Morris (Australian cricketer) (1918–?), Australian cricketer
- Willie Morris (cricketer) (born 1955), South African cricketer

=== Rugby ===
- Bill Morris (rugby union, born 1869) (1869–1946), Welsh international rugby union forward
- Bill Morris (rugby union, born 1894) (1894–1967), Welsh international rugby union player
- Bill Morris (rugby union, born 1940), Wales international rugby union player
- Bill Morris (rugby union, born 1941), Australian-born Welsh international rugby union lock

=== Other sports ===
- William George Morris (1847–1935), Royal Engineers defender in the 1878 FA Cup Final
- William Morris (British sport shooter), competed in 1908 Olympics
- Bill Morris (basketball) (1920–1995), American basketball player
- Bill Morris (Australian rules footballer) (1921–1960), Australian rules footballer
- William Morris (American sport shooter) (born 1939), American Olympic sport shooter (1964)
- Speedy Morris (William Morris, born 1942), American college basketball coach
- Bill Morris (ice hockey) (born 1949), Canadian professional ice hockey player
- Hal Morris (William Harold Morris III, born 1965), American baseball player

== Other people ==
- William O'Connor Morris (1824–1904), Irish county court judge and historian

== Fictional characters ==
- Captain William Morris, a fictional character in the Richard Sharpe novels

== Corporations ==
- William Morris Agency, a Hollywood talent agency
- William Morris Endeavor, a Hollywood talent agency
- William Morris Fine Arts, ex-owner of the Morris Singer foundry

== Places ==
- William C. Morris, Buenos Aires, a town in Argentina
- William Morris (ward), an electoral ward in the London Borough of Waltham Forest named after the writer and designer

== See also ==
- William Morice (disambiguation)
- William Maurice (disambiguation)
