= WRU Division Two North =

Welsh rugby union league

- Founded: 1995
- No. of teams: 10
- Country: Wales
- Most recent champion: COBRA (2018–19)
- Level on pyramid: 2
- Promotion to: WRU Division One North
- Relegation to: WRU Division Three North
- Website: www.wru.co.uk/1162_2096.php

The Welsh Rugby Union Division Two North (also called the SWALEC Division Two North for sponsorship reasons) is a rugby union league in Wales. The league was known as Division Five North before the 2008-09 season.

== Competition format and sponsorship ==
=== Competition ===
There are 10 clubs in the WRU Division Two North. During the course of a season (which lasts from September to May) each club plays the others twice, once at their home ground and once at that of their opponents for a total of 18 games for each club, with a total of 90 games in each season. Teams receive four points for a win and two point for a draw, an additional bonus point is awarded to either team if they score four tries or more in a single match. No points are awarded for a loss though the losing team can gain a bonus point for finishing the match within seven points of the winning team. Teams are ranked by total points, then the number of tries scored and then points difference. At the end of each season, the club with the most points is crowned as champion. If points are equal the tries scored then points difference determines the winner. The team who is declared champion at the end of the season is eligible for promotion to WRU Division One North.

=== Sponsorship ===
In 2008 the Welsh Rugby Union announced a new sponsorship deal for the club rugby leagues with SWALEC valued at £1 million (GBP). The initial three year sponsorship was extended at the end of the 2010/11 season, making SWALEC the league sponsors until 2015. The leagues sponsored are the WRU Divisions one through to seven.

- (2002-2005) Lloyds TSB
- (2005-2008) Asda
- (2008-2015) SWALEC

== 2021/22 Season ==
=== Current League teams ===
- Abergele RFC
- Bangor RFC
- Colwyn Bay RFC
- Mold RFC
- Nant Conwy 2nd XV
- Newtown RFC
- Rhyl and District RFC
- Shotton Steel RFC
- Welshpool RFC
- Wrexham RFC

== 2011/2012 Season ==
=== League teams ===
- Abergele RFC
- COBRA
- Colwyn Bay RFC
- Denbigh RFC
- Dolgellau RFC
- Llanidloes RFC
- Machynlleth RFC
- Newtown RFC
- Rhyl and District RFC
- Wrexham RFC

=== 2011/2012 Table ===
2011-2012 WRU Division Two North League Table
	Club	Played	Won	Drawn	Lost	Points
1	Dolgellau RFC	18	17	0	1	81
2	COBRA	18	15	0	3	66
3	Rhyl and District RFC	18	11	1	6	57
4	Colwyn Bay RFC	18	11	0	7	53
5	Llanidloes RFC	18	9	0	9	43
6	Machynlleth RFC	18	8	0	10	38
7	Denbigh RFC	18	7	1	10	38
8	Abergele RFC	18	7	0	11	32
9	Newtown RFC	18	3	2	13	18
10	Wrexham RFC	18	0	0	18	3

== 2010/2011 Season ==
=== League teams ===
- Abergele RFC
- Bala RFC
- Bangor RFC
- COBRA
- Denbigh RFC
- Dolgellau RFC
- Llanidloes RFC
- Machynlleth RFC
- Newtown RFC
- Rhyl and District RFC
- Welshpool RFC
- Wrexham RFC

=== 2011/2012 Table ===
2010-2011 WRU Division Two North League Table
	Club	Played	Won	Drawn	Lost	Points
1	Bala RFC	22	18	0	4	87
2	Llanidloes	22	18	0	4	86
3	Dolgellau RFC	22	18	0	4	86
4	COBRA	22	16	0	6	77
5	Rhyl and District RFC	22	12	1	9	63
6	Denbigh RFC	22	11	0	11	58
7	Abergele RFC	22	11	1	10	55
8	Newtown RFC	22	11	0	11	53
9	Machynlleth RFC	22	9	0	13	45
10	Wrexham RFC	22	5	0	17	27
11	Welshpool RFC	22	1	1	20	7
12	Bangor RFC	22	0	1	21	5

== 2009/2010 Season ==
=== WRU Division Two North (North) ===
- Bala RFC
- Bangor RFC
- Bethesda RFC
- Rhosllanerchrugog RFC
- Rhyl and District RFC
- Wrexham RFC

=== WRU Division Two North (South) ===
- Caereinion OBRA
- Dolgellau RFC
- Llanidloes RFC
- Machynlleth RFC
- Newtown RFC
- Welshpool RFC

== 2008/2009 Season ==
=== League teams ===
- Bangor RFC
- Bethesda RFC
- Bro Ffestiniog RFC
- Caereinion OBRA
- Llanidloes RFC
- Machynlleth RFC
- Newtown RFC
- Rhosllanerchrugog RFC
- Rhyl and District RFC
- Welshpool RFC
- Wrexham RFC

=== League table ===
2008-2009 WRU Division Five North League Table
Club	Played	Won	Drawn	Lost	Points for	Points against	Tries for	Tries against	Try bonus	Losing bonus	Points
Bro Ffestiniog RFC	18	17	0	1	793	176	124	21	16	0	84
Bethesda RFC	18	16	0	2	734	168	109	19	14	1	79
Caereinion OBRA	18	14	0	4	520	181	79	21	8	1	65
Rhyl and District RFC	18	10	0	8	371	405	55	58	7	2	49
Newtown RFC	18	10	0	8	307	394	39	57	4	2	42
Machynlleth RFC	18	8	0	10	565	430	83	65	9	5	42
Wrexham RFC	18	8	0	10	306	435	47	63	5	2	39
Welshpool RFC	18	4	0	14	313	478	44	75	3	5	24
Rhosllanerchrugog RFC	18	3	0	15	205	578	34	90	4	2	14
Bangor RFC	18	0	0	18	125	994	18	163	0	0	0
Correct as of 21 July 2009											

== 2007/2008 Season ==
=== League teams ===
- Bangor RFC
- Bethesda RFC
- Bro Ffestiniog RFC
- Caereinion OBRA
- Machynlleth RFC
- Pwllheli RFC
- Rhayader RFC
- Rhosllanerchrugog RFC
- Rhyl and District RFC
- Welshpool RFC
- Wrexham RFC

=== League table ===
2007-2008 WRU Division Five North League Table
Club	Played	Won	Drawn	Lost	Points for	Points against	Tries for	Tries against	Try bonus	Losing bonus	Points
Pwllheli RFC	14	13	0	1	623	133	101	13	14	1	67
Bro Ffestiniog RFC	14	11	0	3	452	155	67	25	8	2	54
Bethesda RFC	14	9	0	5	373	202	56	30	8	2	46
Caereinion OBRA	14	9	0	5	254	253	36	38	4	0	40
Machynlleth RFC	14	8	0	6	283	329	39	48	4	1	37
Rhyl and District RFC	14	3	0	11	184	484	31	77	3	2	17
Welshpool RFC	14	3	0	11	205	397	25	60	2	2	16
Rhosllanerchrugog RFC	14	0	0	14	142	563	24	88	1	1	2
Bangor RFC'*'	0	0	0	0	0	0	0	0	0	0	0
Rhayader RFC	0	0	0	0	0	0	0	0	0	0	0
Wrexham RFC	0	0	0	0	0	0	0	0	0	0	0
Correct as of 00:00 13 June 2008											

'*'Early in the 2007/08 season Bangor RFC withdrew from the league in an attempt to restructure the club.
