= WRU Division Three North =

Rugby union league in Wales

- Founded: 2010
- No. of teams: 12
- Country: Wales
- Most recent champion: Wrexham RFC (2012–13)
- Level on pyramid: 3
- Promotion to: WRU Division Two North
- Website: www.wru.co.uk/eng/club/swalecleagues/index.php

The Welsh Rugby Union Division Three North is a rugby union league in Wales.

== Competition format and sponsorship ==
=== Competition ===
There are 12 clubs in the WRU Division Three North. During the course of a season (which lasts from September to May) each club plays the others twice, once at their home ground and once at that of their opponents for a total of 18 games for each club, with a total of 90 games in each season. Teams receive four points for a win and two point for a draw, an additional bonus point is awarded to either team if they score four tries or more in a single match. No points are awarded for a loss though the losing team can gain a bonus point for finishing the match within seven points of the winning team. Teams are ranked by total points, then the number of tries scored and then points difference. At the end of each season, the club with the most points is crowned as champion. If points are equal the tries scored then points difference determines the winner. The team who is declared champion at the end of the season is eligible for promotion to WRU Division Two North.

=== Sponsorship ===
In 2008 the Welsh Rugby Union announced a new sponsorship deal for the club rugby leagues with SWALEC. The sponsorship is a three-year deal that will continue until the 2010/11 season at a cost of £1 million (GBP). The leagues sponsored are the WRU Divisions one through to six.

- (2002–2005) Lloyds TSB
- (2005–2008) Asda
- (2008–2011) SWALEC

== 2012/2013 season ==
=== League teams ===
- Bangor RFC
- Bennllech RFC
- Flint RFC
- Harlech RFC
- Holyhead RFC
- Menai Bridge RFC
- Newtown RFC
- Porthmadog RFC
- Rhosllanerchrugg RFC
- Welshpool RFC
- Wrexham RFC

=== 2012/2013 Table ===
2012-2013 WRU Division Three North League Table
| | Club | Played | Won | Drawn | Lost | Points |
|---|---|---|---|---|---|---|
| 1 | Wrexham RFC | 18 | 15 | 0 | 3 | 73 |
| 2 | Newtown RFC | 18 | 13 | 1 | 4 | 69 |
| 3 | Harlech RFC | 18 | 14 | 0 | 4 | 65 |
| 4 | Menai Bridge RFC | 18 | 13 | 1 | 4 | 65 |
| 5 | Rhosllanerchrugog RFC | 18 | 12 | 1 | 5 | 60 |
| 6 | Welshpool RFC | 18 | 7 | 1 | 10 | 36 |
| 7 | Flint RFC | 18 | 6 | 0 | 12 | 30 |
| 8 | Bangor RFC | 18 | 3 | 0 | 15 | 18 |
| 9 | Porthmadog RFC | 4 | 1 | 0 | 3 | 6 |
| 10 | Holyhead RFC | 18 | 1 | 0 | 17 | 5 |
| 11 | Benllech RFC | 0 | 0 | 0 | 0 | 0 |

== 2011/2012 season ==
=== League teams ===
- Bangor RFC
- Benllech RFC
- Caer Borderers RFC WITHDRAWN
- Flint RFC
- Harlech RFC
- Holyhead RFC
- Llangoed RFC WITHDRAWN
- Llangollen RFC
- Menai Bridge RFC
- Rhosllanerchrugog RFC
- Shotten Steel RFC
- Welshpool RFC

=== 2011/2012 Table ===
2011-2012 WRU Division Three North League Table
| | Club | Played | Won | Drawn | Lost | Points |
|---|---|---|---|---|---|---|
| 1 | Shotton Steel RFC | 18 | 18 | 0 | 0 | 88 |
| 2 | Llangollen RFC | 18 | 15 | 0 | 3 | 72 |
| 3 | Rhosllanerchrugog RFC | 18 | 13 | 0 | 5 | 67 |
| 4 | Harlech RFC | 18 | 10 | 0 | 8 | 50 |
| 5 | Flint RFC | 18 | 10 | 0 | 8 | 47 |
| 6 | Welshpool RFC | 18 | 9 | 0 | 9 | 40 |
| 7 | Menai Bridge RFC | 18 | 6 | 0 | 12 | 33 |
| 8 | Benllech RFC | 18 | 7 | 0 | 11 | 31 |
| 9 | Bangor RFC | 18 | 1 | 0 | 17 | 6 |
| 10 | Holyhead RFC | 18 | 1 | 0 | 17 | 6 |
| 11 | Caer Borderers RFC | 0 | 0 | 0 | 0 | 0 |
| 12 | Llangoed RFC | 0 | 0 | 0 | 0 | 0 |

== 2010/2011 season ==
- Benllech RFC
- Flint RFC
- Harlech RFC
- Holyhead RFC
- Llangoed RFC
- Llangollen RFC
- Menai Bridge RFC
- Rhosllanerchrugog RFC
- Shotten Steel RFC
