= William C. Morris =

William C. Morris may refer to:

- William Case Morris (1864–1932), English pastor and social activist in Argentina
- William Charles Morris (1874–1940), American cartoonist
- William C. Morris, American publisher and namesake of the William C. Morris Award
- William C. Morris, Buenos Aires, a town named after William Case Morris

== See also ==
- William Morris (disambiguation)
