= Athraw =

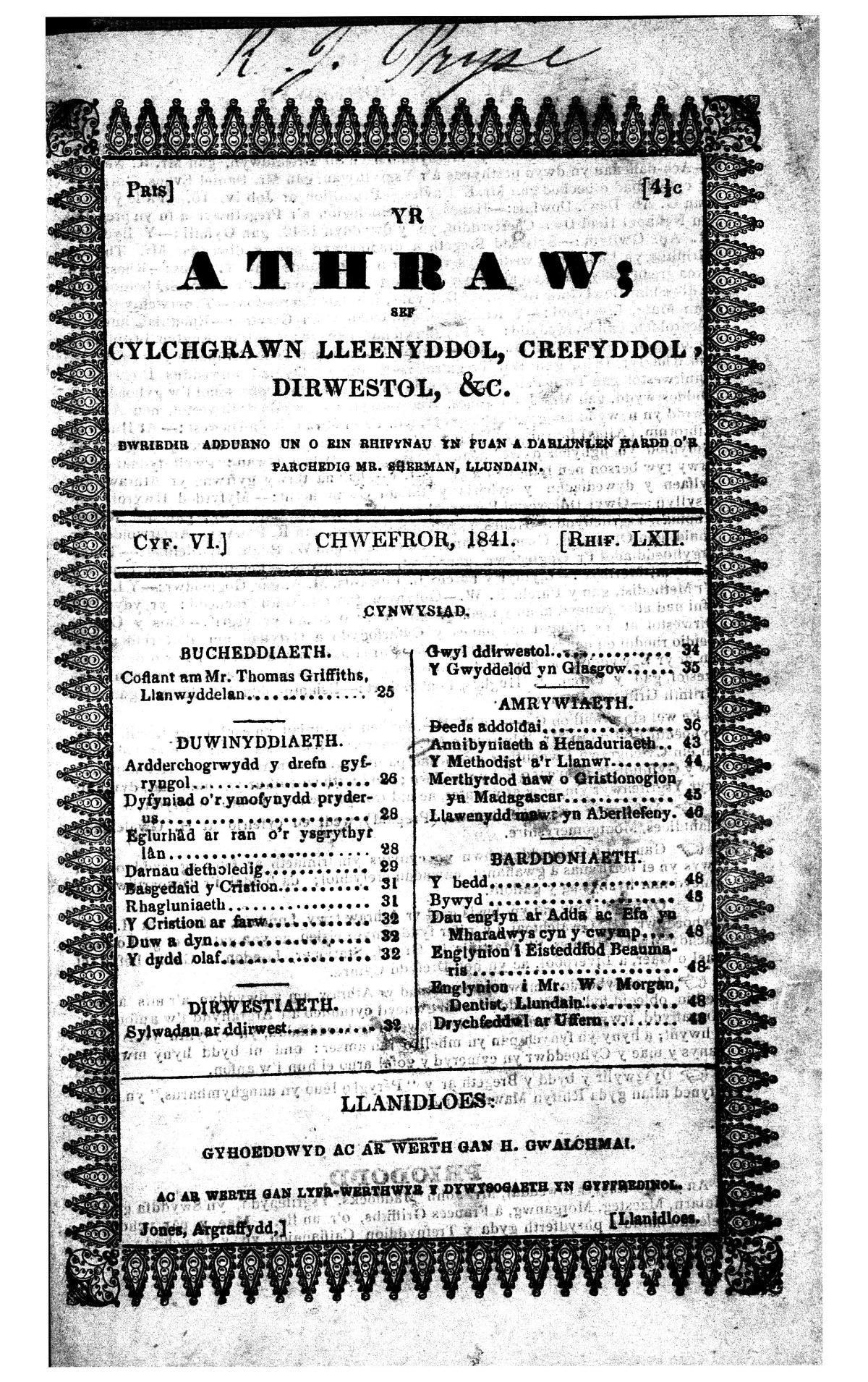
Athraw (Llanidloes) (Welsh Journal)

Athraw was a Welsh language periodical published in Llanidloes, Wales by Humphrey Gwalchmai, a local Methodist minister.

Athraw began publication in 1836, and ceased in 1844, when it was (by arrangement) succeeded by Y Drysorfa (1845 -). It mainly contained articles on temperance and other religious matters, and also poetry.
