= Llanidloes Town Hall =

Municipal Building in Llanidloes, Wales

- Neuadd y Dref Llanidloes (Welsh)
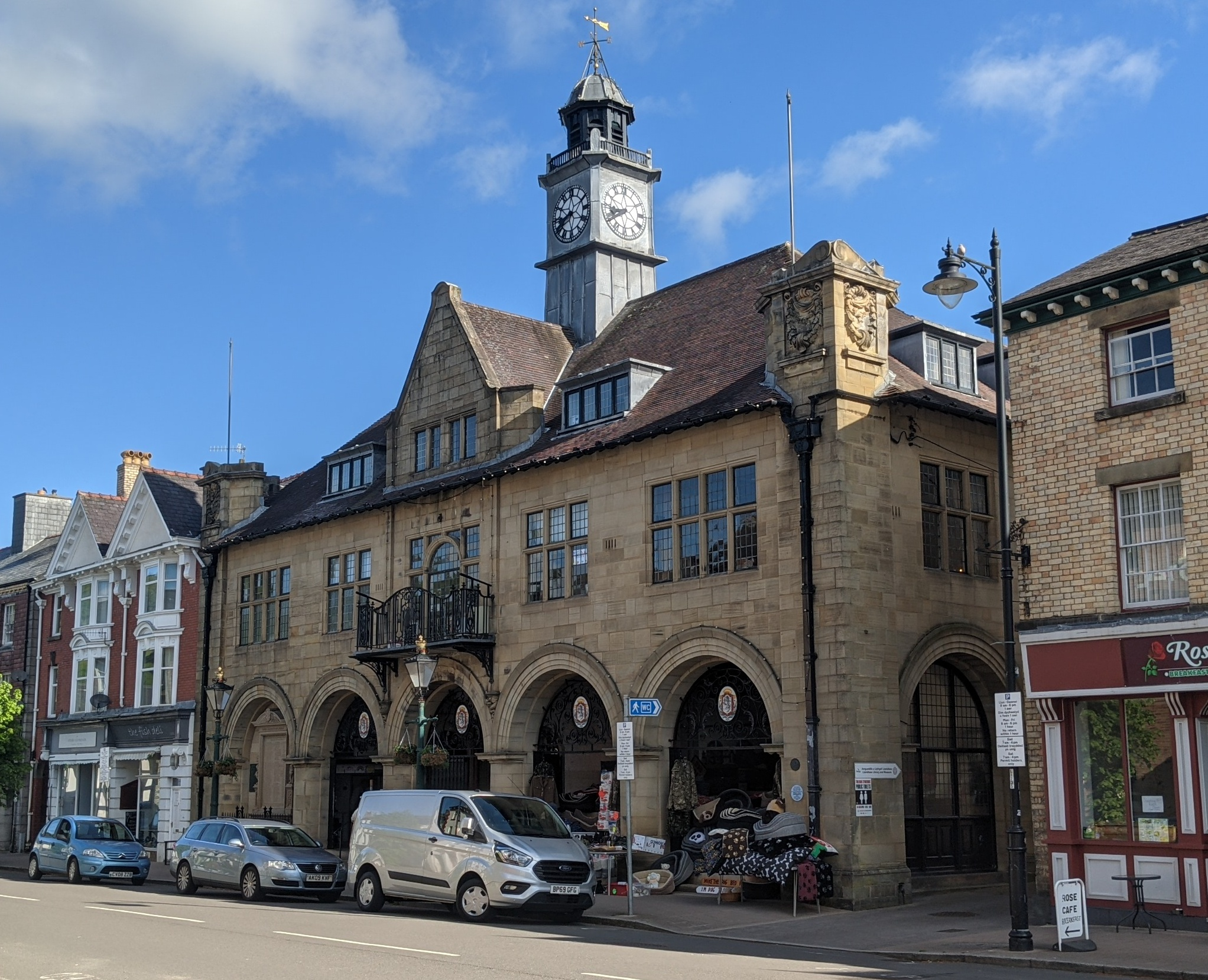
- Llanidloes Town Hall

- Shown in Powys
- 52.4486°N 3.5395°W
- Location: Great Oak Street, Llanidloes

History
- Built: 1908

Site notes
- Architect(s): Frank Shayler and Thomas Ridge
- Architectural style: Arts and Crafts style

Listed Building – Grade II
- Official name: Llanidloes Town Hall
- Designated: 10 April 1989
- Reference no.: 8258

Llanidloes Town Hall (Welsh: Neuadd y Dref Llanidloes) is a municipal building in Great Oak Street, Llanidloes in Powys, Wales. The structure, which is the meeting place of Llanidloes Town Council as well as the home of the Llanidloes Museum and the Llanidloes Public Library, is a Grade II listed building.

== History of the building ==
The building was commissioned following of a request from the local Free Church Council who believed the town needed a public library and a temperance hotel, although the concept was significantly adjusted to create a new market hall and a new meeting place for the borough council, who had previously met in the Old Market Hall. The site was paid for by the borough council and the cost of construction was paid for by the descendants of David Davies of Llandinam who had served as a member of parliament and had been involved in the construction of the Llanidloes and Newtown Railway, which had opened in 1859.

The building was designed by Frank Shayler and Thomas Ridge in the Arts and Crafts style, built in Cefn stone from Minera and was officially opened on 20 April 1908. The design involved a symmetrical main frontage with five bays facing onto Great Oak Street; it was arcaded on the ground floor, so that markets could be held. The openings on the ground floor were flanked by columns and imposts supporting moulded arches. On the first floor, the central bay featured a three-light window, in a style influenced by Norman Shaw, with a wrought iron balcony in front and a cross-gable containing a four-light mullioned window above. The other bays on the first floor were fenestrated by three and four-light mullioned and transomed windows. At roof level, there was a central clock-tower surmounted by a bellcote with a weather vane, and the cross-gable was flanked by dormer windows. Internally, the principal rooms were the market hall on the ground floor and the council chamber and offices on the first floor.

Shayler was a notable architect of the Arts and Crafts movement and the architectural historians, Robert Scourfield and Richard Haslam, have described it as "one of the best examples of his work". A war memorial, in the form of stone plaque, intended to commemorate the lives of local service personnel who died in the First World War was paid for by the former mayor, Alderman Richard Jerman, and installed in the first opening on the left in the early 1920s.

The building served as the meeting place of Llanidloes Borough Council for much of the 20th century but ceased to be local seat of government when the enlarged Montgomeryshire District Council was formed in 1974. Instead the council chamber became the meeting place of Llanidloes Town Council and, in 1995, the Llanidloes Museum relocated from the Old Market Hall, where it been originally established, to the ground floor of the town hall. In 2000, the town council made an additional room available to the museum thereby doubling its space and, in 2017, the local public library relocated to the town hall as well.

A three-stage restoration on the building began in 2023 and was completed in January 2025. However, due to faulty waterproof membrane, the wooden arch next to China Street became rotten; additionally, some panelling had turned from white to green due to rain damage, prompting a need for further repairs.

== Llanidloes Museum ==
The museum, which was established in 1930, holds a local history collection with items associated with the chartist riots of 1839, the construction of the Llanidloes and Newtown Railway and items relating to the local woollen and mining industries.
