= William Morice =

William Morice may refer to:

- William Morice (died 1554) (1500–1554), MP
- William Morice (Secretary of State) (1602–1676), English Secretary of State 1660–8, Member of Parliament for Devon, Newport (Cornwall) and Plymouth
- Sir William Morice, 1st Baronet (1628–1690), his eldest son, Member of Parliament for Newport 1689–1690
- William Morice (1660-1688), eldest son of the 1st Baronet, Member of Parliament for Newport 1681–1688
- Sir William Morice, 3rd Baronet (1707–1750), Member of Parliament for Newport 1727–1734, and for Launceston 1734–1750
- William Morice (Archdeacon of Armagh)

== See also ==
- William Maurice (disambiguation)
- William Morris (disambiguation)
