= William Maurice =

William Maurice may refer to:

- Sir William Maurice (politician), Welsh politician
- William Maurice, Prince of Nassau-Siegen
- William Maurice (antiquary) (1620–1680)
- William Maurice (pirate), first man to be hanged, drawn and quartered in England in 1241

== See also ==
- William Morice (disambiguation)
- William Morris (disambiguation)
