= Kevin Lloyd (footballer, born 1970) =

Welsh footballer

Personal information
- Full name: Kevin Gareth Lloyd
- Date of birth: 26 September 1970 (age 56)
- Place of birth: Llanidloes, Wales
- Position: Left-back

Senior career*
Years	Team	Apps	(Gls)
1992–1994	Caersws	88	(9)
1994–1996	Hereford United	51	(3)
1996–1998	Cardiff City	33	(1)
1998–1999	Caersws	22	(2)
1999–2001	Bath City	44	(4)
- * Club domestic league appearances and goals

Kevin Gareth Lloyd (born 26 September 1970) is a Welsh former professional footballer.

== Early life ==
Lloyd was born in Llanidloes.

== Career ==
An attacking full-back, Lloyd began his career playing in the Welsh Premier League with Caersws. His performances persuaded Hereford United to bring him to Edgar Street in November 1994 and he quickly established himself in the side. However a spate of injuries in his second year meant he struggled to make regular appearances and was released at the end of the season.

He instead signed for Cardiff City where he again broke into the first team squad, scoring his first and only goal for the club with a lob against Carlisle United. The following season he was struck by another injury, this time due to a severe back injury which restricted him to just four appearances all season and led to his release by the club at the end of the 1997–98 season, although he was allowed to train with the side during the summer in order to retain fitness. After an unsuccessful trial at Oldham Athletic, Lloyd returned to his first club Caersws. After one season at Caersws, he joined Bath City but was forced to retire in 2001 due to continued back problems.
