= Bill Morris (rugby union, born 1941) =

Wales international rugby union footballer

- Born: William John Morris; 16 June 1941 Melbourne, Australia
- School: Grove Park, Wrexham
- Occupation: solicitor

Rugby union career
- Position: Lock
Amateur team(s)
| Years | Team | Apps | (Points) |
- Wrexham RFC
| – | New Brighton F.C. | | |
| – | Newport RFC | | |
| – | Barbarian F.C. | | |
Senior career
| Years | Team | Apps | (Points) |
| 1963–69 | Newport | 167 | (48) |
International career
| Years | Team | Apps | (Points) |
| 1965–66 | Wales | 2 | (0) |

William John Morris (born 16 June 1941) was an Australian born, Welsh international rugby union lock who played club rugby for Wrexham and Newport and international rugby for Wales. Morris also played for the Barbarians and toured with them to South Africa in 1969, during the apartheid era. He is the third of four players known as Bill Morris to represent Wales at rugby union.

== Personal history ==
Morris was born in Australia in 1941, the son of a Welsh man who had joined the Colonial Service and while in Australia had joined the Australian Air Force on the outbreak of the Second World War. His mother was a Russian from Vladivostok, who his father had met in China. His family returned to Britain settling in Wrexham, north Wales where Morris attended Grove Park School. On leaving education he gained employment as a solicitor.

== Rugby career ==
Morris played rugby as a youth for his school and at club level he first joined Wrexham and also turned out for English team New Brighton F.C. A promising young adult, he was first capped for Wales at under-23 level, before moving to Newport to play with top-flight Welsh club Newport during the 1963/64 season. He first represented Newport against Bristol on 14 September 1963, and as a second row lock, he forged a strong pairing with club captain Brian Price.

Morris gained his first cap for Wales in the fixture against Scotland in Murrayfield as part of the 1965 Five Nations Championship. He was brought in alongside Price and the result was a narrow 14–12 win to Wales. Although this was Morris' only match of the Championship, Wales had already beaten England, and went on to defeat Ireland, making Morris part of a Triple Crown winning side. His second and final international cap was in the 1966 Championship in Ireland. With Wales clinging on to a narrow victory, Morris, in the final seconds inexplicably threw the ball into touch awarding Ireland a penalty kick which could draw the game. Fortunately for Morris, a strong wind saw French kicker Claude Lacaze's effort swept away from the post to give Wales the match. Whether his poor final minute decision was a factor is unknown, but Morris was not selected for Wales again.

Morris continued to represent Newport, and in 1966 he was part of the team that faced Australia in their 1966/67 tour. Newport drew 3-3, though at one point Morris had thought he had put his team in front with a try, only for it to be disallowed by the referee. In total he made 167 appearances for Newport, scoring 16 tries before retiring from the sport in 1969.

The final team that Morris represented was invitational tourists, the Barbarians. He was first invited to play for the 'Baa-Baas' during the 1965 season when he played against East Midlands. It would be four years until he was again called to play, when he was selected to join the team on their 1969 Easter tour. On that tour he played against East Midland, Cardiff and Swansea. That year he was invited to join the Barbarians on their third overseas tour, on a controversial trip to South Africa during apartheid. Six games were played in South Africa, against regional and invitational teams, and Morris played in four of them, Quaggas, SA Barbarians, South African Country Districts and Rhodesia. On returning to Britain he quit rugby citing the 'pressures of his job'.

=== International matches played ===
Wales

- France 1966
- Scotland 1965

== Bibliography ==
- Godwin, Terry (1984). The International Rugby Championship 1883–1983. Grafton Street, London: Willow Books. ISBN 0-00-218060-X.
- Griffiths, John (1987). The Phoenix Book of International Rugby Records. London: Phoenix House. ISBN 0-460-07003-7.
- Jenkins, John M.; et al. (1991). Who's Who of Welsh International Rugby Players. Wrexham: Bridge Books. ISBN 1-872424-10-4.
- Roderick, Alan (1995). Newport Rugby Greats. Newport: Handpost Books. ISBN 0-9515213-5-7.
- Smith, David; Williams, Gareth (1980). Fields of Praise: The Official History of The Welsh Rugby Union. Cardiff: University of Wales Press. ISBN 0-7083-0766-3.
