= Godfrey Darbishire =

Wales international rugby union player

- Born: Godfrey Darbishire; 26 September 1853 Chorlton-cum-Hardy, Manchester, England
- Died: 29 October 1889 (aged 36) Polk County, Florida, United States
- School: Rugby School
- University: Balliol College, Oxford
- Occupation(s): Civil engineer and surveyor

Rugby union career
- Position: Forward
Amateur team(s)
| Years | Team | Apps | (Points) |
- Bangor RFC
International career
| Years | Team | Apps | (Points) |
| 1881 | Wales | 1 | (0) |

Godfrey Darbishire FRGS (26 September 1853 – 29 October 1889) was an English-born rugby union forward who represented Bangor at club level and played international rugby for Wales, gaining one cap in the country's very first international rugby match.

== Personal life ==
Godfrey Darbishire was born in Chorlton-on-Medlock, Manchester, in 1853. He was educated at Rugby School before graduating to Balliol College, Oxford. After spending 18 months at Oxford, his father removed him from the university to rejoin the family. Darbishire moved to North Wales, where his family were quarry owners, well known in the Caernarvonshire area. Darbishire settled in the town of Penmaenmawr where he stayed at Pendyffryn Hall, the family's manor house. The 1881 census records Darbishire's profession as a civil engineer and surveyor, which has some connection to the family's business in stone quarrying.

In 1883, Darbishire emigrated to America where he carried out important surveys of the state. While in America he met Annie Stein Shelby of Chicago. They married in Danville, Kentucky, on 3 June 1885, and had one known child, Robert Shelby Derbishire in 1886, by which time the family had moved to Fort Meade in Florida, where Darbishire had become an orange farmer. It was while living in Polk County that Darbishire died on 29 October 1889, after becoming ill from exposure while on a small boat in the sea off Key West. He was 36 years of age.

== Rugby career ==
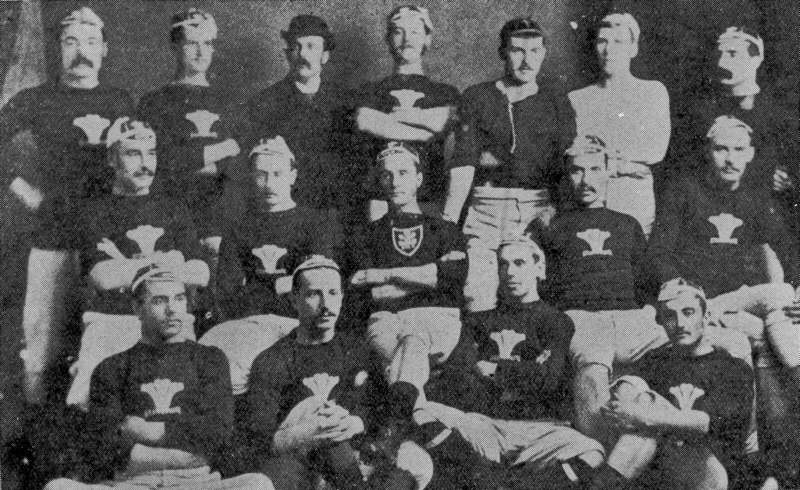
The first Welsh team, Darbishire is standing in the back row, third from right, February 1881

Darbishire began playing rugby while a schoolboy, playing for the Rugby School team. He continued his enjoyment of sport while at Oxford University, playing rugby and joining the boat club, and when he settled in the family's North Wales home he turned out for Bangor cricket club a few miles down the coast. By 1876, the cricket team had branched out and formed a rugby team, of which Darbishire was one of the first players. With a lack of opposition, the team also played association football.

In 1881, Richard Mullock arranged the first international fixture for a Welsh team, to be played at Blackheath in London, against England. The problem was that Mullock did not have a team. In an attempt to gain the support of as many regions of Wales as possible, Mullock began selecting "gentlemen" players based on their geographic location. Darbishire fitted this profile, with a schooling at Rugby and Oxford and a membership of one of the few northern clubs. Even the fact that he had not played a rugby game in over two years was not seen as a drawback.

The game against England was a sporting disaster, with the Welsh team meeting without any trials. Few of them had played together and several of the players were placed out of position. The English team scored 13 tries, winning the game by eight goals to nil. The Welsh team were humiliated and only four of the fifteen players returned against Ireland in the country's second international. It was Darbishire's one and only appearance for Wales.

=== International matches played ===
Wales (rugby union)

- England 1881

== Bibliography ==
- Smith, David; Williams, Gareth (1980). Fields of Praise: The Official History of The Welsh Rugby Union. Cardiff: University of Wales Press. ISBN 0-7083-0766-3.
