= Dol-Llys Hall =

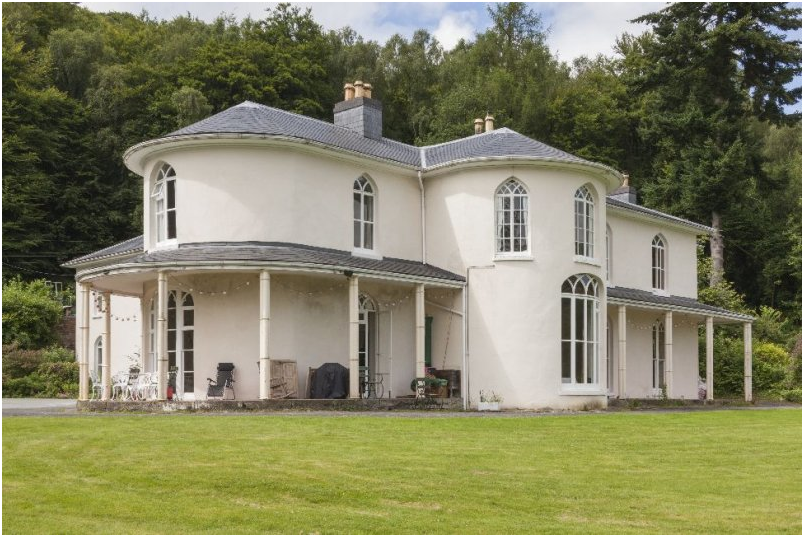

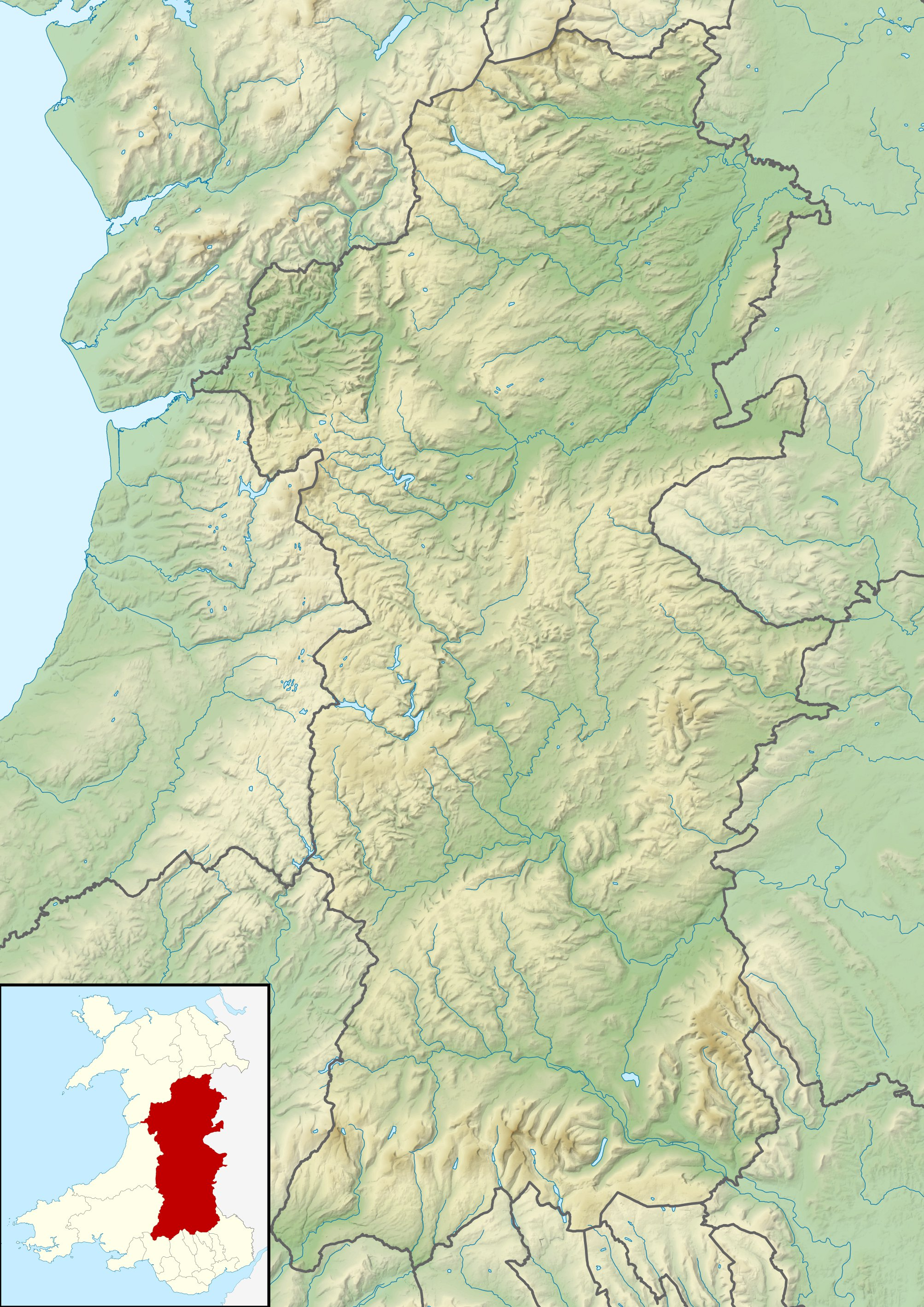
- Location within Powys
- 52.4595°N 3.5327°W
- Type: Country house
- Location: Llanidloes, Powys, Wales

History
- Built: 1808-1813

Site notes
- Architectural style: Regency
- Governing body: Privately owned

Listed Building – Grade II*
- Official name: Dol-Llys Hall
- Designated: 10 March 1953
- Reference no.: 8388

Listed Building – Grade II
- Official name: Dol-Llys Lodge
- Designated: 10 April 1989
- Reference no.: 8387

Dol-Llys Hall (Dôl-Llys) is a country house dating from the early 19th century in the community of Llanidloes, Powys, Wales. Now run as a cooperative and cohousing community, it is a Grade II* listed building.

== History ==
The origins of the present hall were unusual. In the mid-18th century the Dol-Llys estate was owned by the Mears family, who had moved north to Montgomeryshire from Brecon. (Note: Heneb, the Welsh archaeology trust, notes the 19th-century trend for wealthy industrialists and landowners to favour the construction of country villas to the north of Llanidloes, enabling them to combine seclusion with proximity.) George Mears was sheriff of the county in 1759 and was followed in that office by his son, Hugh, in 1781. His grandson, Maurice, who died in 1807, had asked his solicitor, a Mr Stephens, to prepare a will naming eleven possible heirs to the estate, in order of precedence. Stephens suggested that one further name be added, to make a round dozen, and Maurice Mears invited him to include either himself or his son, George. Stephens included his son as the twelfth name, only for the prior eleven in the list all to die prematurely. George Stephens then inherited the estate, changing his name to Mears.

On his inheritance, Mears built the present house between 1808 and 1813. The Mears family lost their money on the failure of the Welshpool Bank and the estate was sold in 1865. It had a number of private owners in the 20th century, and during the Second World War housed the boys of St Winifred's School, when they were evacuated from Seaford in Sussex. The house later became a council-run retirement home. (Note: A resident of Dol Llys during its time as a retirement home was a Mrs Jessie Wills Anderson, who survived the sinking of the RMS Titanic in 1912. Dying in 1963, she is buried in the churchyard of St Michael and All Angels Church, Kerry.)

=== Housing cooperative ===
In 1991 the hall and 14.5 acres of the original estate were bought by a group of individuals who established a housing cooperative. The cohousing community lives in seven self-contained flats and shares the grounds and communal spaces in the house. In 2019, a resident at Dol Llys, Rachael Marshall, was appointed as Powys County Council's first cohousing officer.

== Architecture and description ==
The house is of two storeys with slate roofs. Cadw considers it as a "Picturesque Gothic country house in the style of John Nash". (Note: There are design similarities to John Nash' Cronkhill, an almost contemporaneous house in neighbouring Shropshire.) Robert Scourfield and Richard Haslam, in their Powys volume in the Buildings of Wales series, describe the main, garden, front as a "delightful façade", with a central bow window and extensive verandas.

Cadw designates the hall a Grade II* listed building. The lodge at the entrance to the drive has a separate Grade II listing. The Royal Commission on the Ancient and Historical Monuments of Wales notes the main features of the garden as a lake with an island, ponds, woodland and lawns.

== Sources ==
- Dodd, A. H. (March 1926). "The Beginnings of Banking in North Wales". Economica. 16 (16). Jstor: 16–30. doi:10.2307/2548546. JSTOR 2548546.
- Scourfield, Robert; Haslam, Richard (2013). Powys: Montgomeryshire,Radnorshire and Breconshire. The Buildings of Wales. New Haven, US and London: Yale University Press. ISBN 978-0-300-18508-9. OCLC 863678002.
