= Newtown RFC =

(Wales) Newtown RFC
- Full name: Newtown Rugby Football Club
- Founded: 1925
- Location: Newtown, Wales
- Ground(s): Recreation Ground
- Coach(es): Gareth Gerrard (“G”)
- League(s): WRU Division Five North
- 2008-09: 5th
Team kit

Official website
- www.newtownrugby.co.uk

Newtown Rugby Football Club is a rugby union club in Newtown, Mid Wales. Newtown RFC is a member of the Welsh Rugby Union and is a feeder club for the Llanelli Scarlets.

Newton Rugby club formed in 1925 and played their first game against Oswestry on 28 March that year. The club later disbanded in the 1960/61 season and reformed in 1971 and on 6 November played against local rivals Welshpool. The club applied for Welsh Rugby Union membership in 1992 and was awarded membership on 1 June 1995. The club now fields a Senior, Seconds, Thirds and Youth teams, and their facilities include two playing pitches, one floodlit.

== Club honours ==
- Mid Wales League 1990/91 - Winners
- Mid Wales League 1991/92 - Winners
- Mid Wales League Division Two 1996/97 - Winners
