= Old Market Hall, Llanidloes =

Old Market Hall,
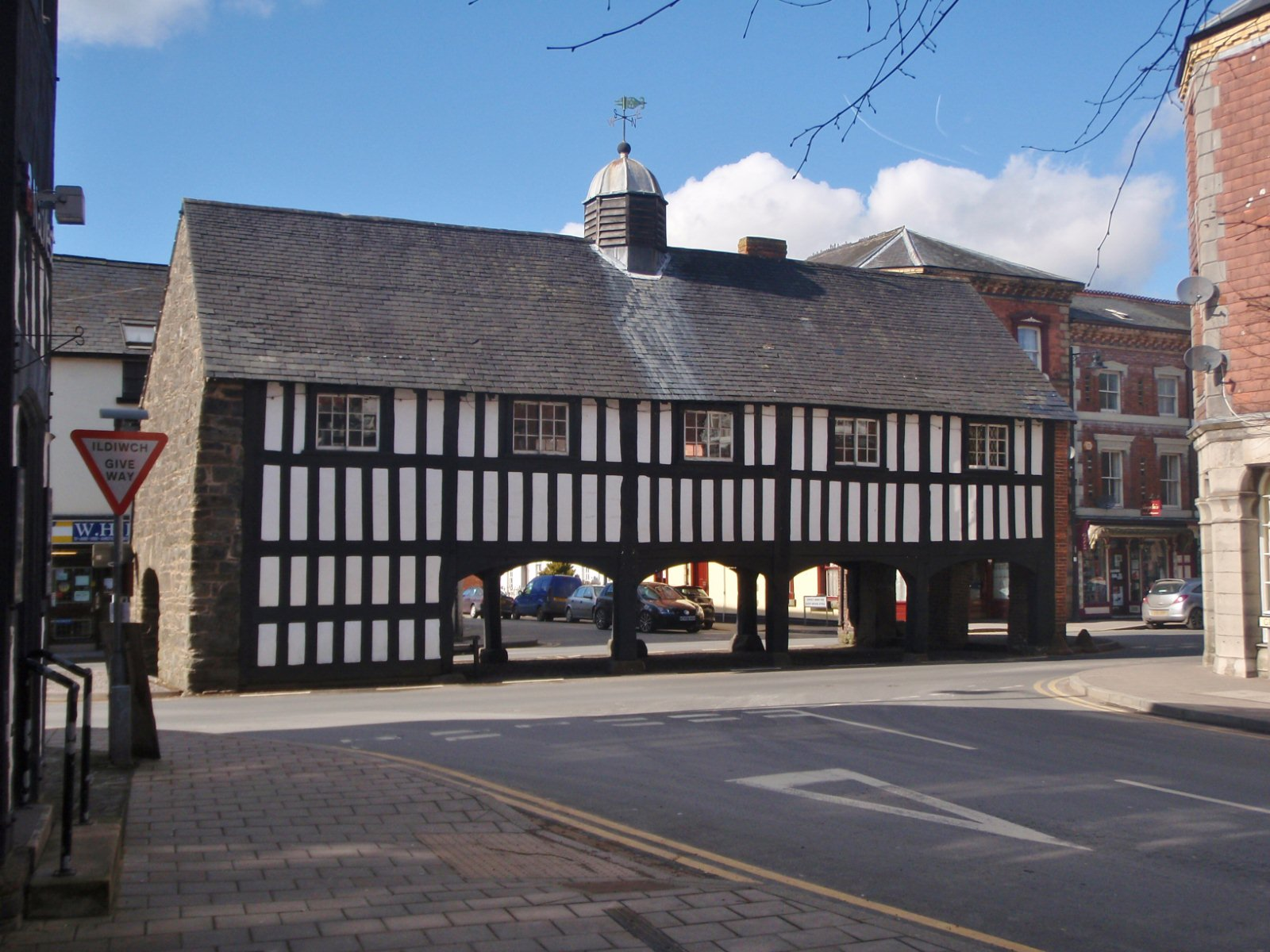
- View from east-south-east (Great Oak Street)

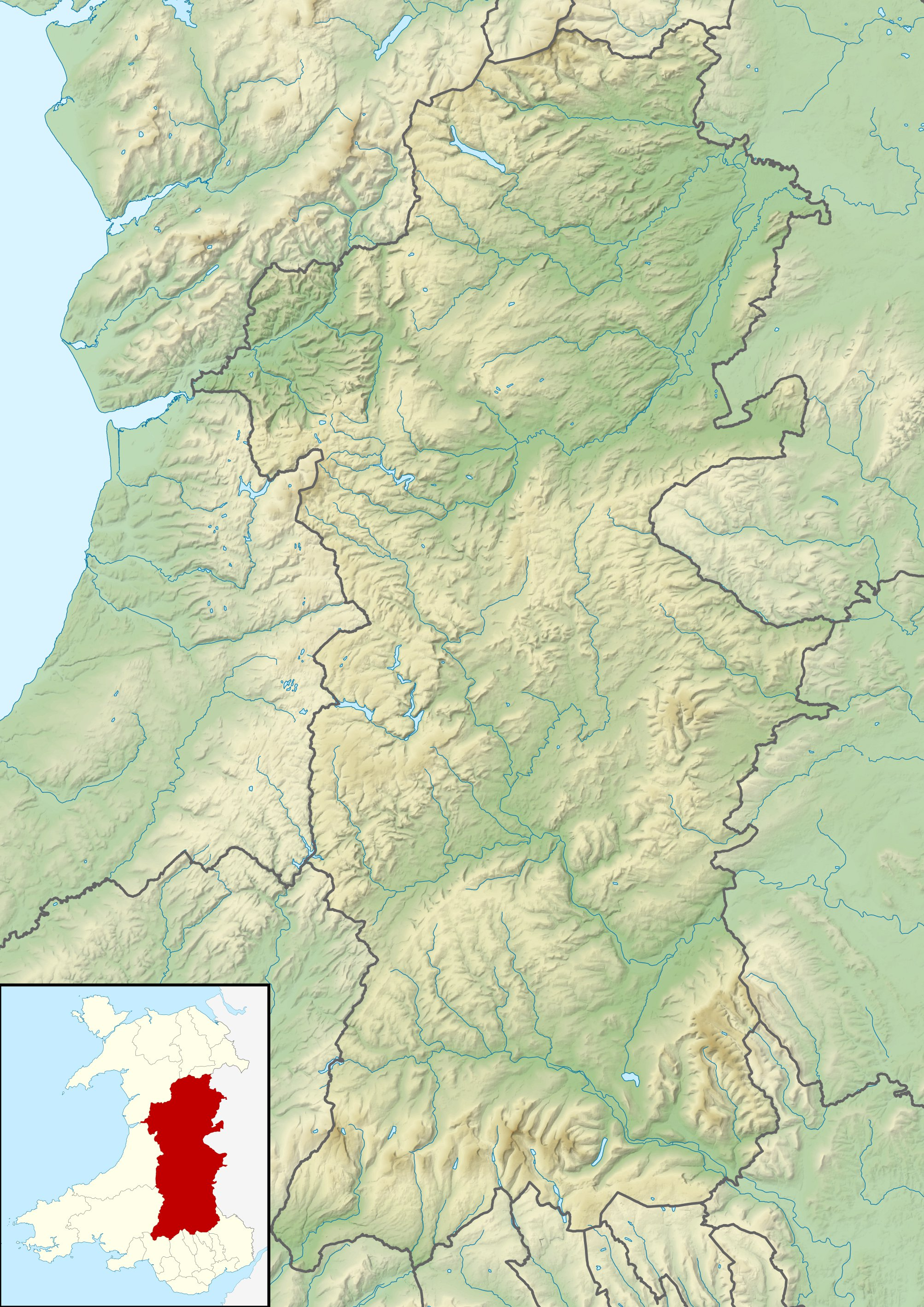
- Location within Powys

General information
- Type: Market hall
- Coordinates: 52.448610°N 3.540221°W
- Completed: c. 1615

Technical details
- Structural system: Timber framing

Design and construction
- Designations: NPRN 32039 (see Designated landmark)

The Old Market Hall is the oldest timber-framed market hall in Llanidloes, Wales, dating to the early 17th century. Until well into the 20th century a weekly market was held on the open cobbled ground floor. Over the years the large and well-lit upper floor room has been used as a wool and flannel market, law court, preachers' hall, flannel store, working men's institute and museum.

== Description ==
The market hall is at the centre of Llanidloes, at the crossing of the town's four main streets. (Note: China Street is to the south-south-west of the hall, and Long Bridge Street to the north-north-east. Short Bridge Street is to the west-north-west and Great Oak Street to the east-south-east.) It is built of stone, brick and timber. The two storey building has five bays defined by posts. There was an open marketplace of pitched and cobbled paving on the ground floor. The closed market was held above in a long and well-lighted room supported by oak beams and arches. The building, which was in the middle of the main road from the north to the south of Wales, was typical of market halls of the period in most mid-Wales market towns.

A large door on the upper floor was once used to load and unload wool. It has since been closed off. A door and stairway in the east bay gave access to the upper hall. This door has also been closed. The roof is of slate, with overhanging eaves. It has a glazed octagonal cupola. The cupola contained a bell that was used to ring the curfew, and is topped by a weathervane dated 1738.

== History ==
King Edward I of England granted a market charter to Llanidloes in 1280, with the market originally held round a market cross in the town centre. The Market Hall replaced the old market in the 17th century. The timber-framed market hall was built between 1612 and 1622, but some of the timbers date back to the mid-16th century. Originally it was called the Booth Hall, a reference to the stalls or "booths" under and around the hall.

Until the 19th century the hall was a busy centre of the Welsh woollen trade, where wool and flannel was brought to be taken to Welshpool. The wool market was in the upper room, which was also used as a court of law and a preachers hall. The assizes were held in the market in 1606 and 1629. The area at present occupied by a stairway was once used as the town jail. John Wesley (1703–1791) is said to have preached in the hall in 1748, 1749 and 1764. The "Wesley stone" on which he stood in 1749 when speaking to a large congregation is now outside the north west corner. The stone wall at the south end was rebuilt some time after the original building. The brick gable end facing Long Bridge Street was rebuilt in 1765.

The hall was used as a flannel store in the later Victorian era. In June 1876 the Freemasons of the province of North Wales and Shropshire had a banquet in the Market Hall. It was used by the Working Men's Institute and Library from 1897. The Working Men's Institute and Library moved to the Llanidloes Town Hall when it was opened in 1908. As of July 1910 tolls were still being taken for stalls pitched on Saturdays in the ground floor open market. The hall was owned by Colonel J. Davies-Jenkins of Pennygreen, Llanidloes.

From 1930 to 1995 the town museum was housed in the hall. In 1957–59 the whole building was carefully restored. Heavy traffic was starting to affect the structure, but a bypass road has reduced the risk of damage from vibration. As of 2016 the hall contained a permanent display on timber-frame buildings, describing their history, construction techniques and uses. The exhibit includes a section on dating timber through tree rings and on restoration of the buildings

== Sources ==
- Dillon, Paddy (14 April 2014), Glyndwr's Way, Cicerone Press, ISBN 978-1-78362-049-4
- Freemasons of North Wales (1876), "Freemasonry in North Wales. Llanidloes and Newtown", The Freemason's Chronicle, W.W. Morgan.
- Jenkins, David (1998), Come to Wales: Publicity Photographs from the Great Western Railway 1905-1940, National Museum Wales, ISBN 978-0-7200-0456-4
- "Llanidloes Old Market Hall in Wales", Wales Directory
- OS Six Inch, 1888-1913, Ordnance Survey, archived from the original on 30 November 2012
- Royal Commission on the Ancient and Historical Monuments (1911), An Inventory of the Ancient Monuments in Wales and Monmouthshire: I - County of Montgomery, Royal Commission on the Ancient and Historical Monuments of Wales, GGKEY:HRABCGX5SDD
- Steele, K. (5 January 2009), "Old Market Hall, Llanidloes", Coflein, Royal Commission on the Ancient and Historical Monuments of Wales
- The Old Market Hall, L.L.A.N.I., archived from the original on 1 April 2016
- "Te old Market Hall", Victorian Powys, Powys County Archives
