= Hugh Vincent =

Welsh rugby union player, footballer, and politician

- Born: Hugh Corbet Vincent; 27 April 1862 Caernarfon, Wales
- Died: 22 February 1931 (aged 68) Bangor, Wales
- School: Friars School, Bangor; Sherborne School
- University: Trinity College, Dublin
- Occupation: solicitor

Rugby union career
- Position: Forward
Amateur team(s)
| Years | Team | Apps | (Points) |
- Bangor RFC
International career
| Years | Team | Apps | (Points) |
| 1882 | Wales | 1 | (0) |

Sir Hugh Corbet Vincent (27 April 1862 – 22 February 1931) was a Wales rugby union, association football player and politician. He played club rugby for Bangor RFC and club football for Carnarvon Wanderers and Bangor City F.C. as well as a single international for the Wales national rugby union team. A solicitor by profession, Vincent also ran for parliament and was Mayor of Bangor, and in 1924 was knighted for political and public services.

== Personal life ==
Hugh Vincent was born in 1862 to Rev. James Crawley Vincent and Grace Johnson. His paternal grandfather, the Very Reverend James Vincent Vincent was the Dean of Bangor Cathedral. Vincent was one of seven children, but in 1869, Vincent's father died during a cholera epidemic. Vincent was initially educated at the local public school, Friars School but later switched to Sherborne School in England. He graduated to Trinity College, Dublin and after obtaining his degree, moved to Caernarfon where he became articled to solicitor Charles Jones. Once Vincent had qualified as a solicitor, he went into partnership with a Mr H. Loyd Carter.

A keen local politician, Vincent served on the Bangor City Council, and during his time with the council served as the mayor of Bangor on three occasions. In 1910 he stood for the political seat of Caernarfon against Liberal politician, and then Chancellor of the Exchequer, David Lloyd George, but did not win the election. Vincent was knighted in the 1924 Prime Minister's Resignation Honours.

He married Bronwen Adelaide Trevor and they had six children, five daughters and a son. His son died in France during World War I, while serving with the Welsh Regiment. Vincent's younger brother, William Henry Hoare Vincent, was a civil servant who represented India at the League of Nations, and was himself knighted, in 1913.

== Rugby career ==
Vincent was a notable sportsman, playing for three different clubs in Bangor, the rugby, football and cricket clubs. He was also the club captain of St Deiniol's Golf Club.

Vincent had a brief but notable rugby career, playing in one of the first Welsh teams. In 1882, after Wales were humiliated by England in the first Welsh international rugby match, a game was arranged with Ireland. This was the first time the two teams met, but on arrival at Dublin, the Welsh team arrived a player short. This was not an unusual occurrence for the time, and Wales turned to Trinity College, Dublin to supply a stand-in from the university's rugby team. Vincent, with his Welsh background, was a perfect replacement and came into the pack for his only game. The result was a massive turn around for the Welsh team, and after losing to England by eight tries to nil, they beat Ireland by two goals to nil. Vincent never played for Wales again, but continued playing for Bangor on his return to Wales.

=== International matches played ===
Wales

- Ireland 1882

== Bibliography ==
- Griffiths, John (1987). The Phoenix Book of International Rugby Records. London: Phoenix House. ISBN 0-460-07003-7.
- Lloyd, John Edward; Jenkins, R.T. (1958). Dictionary of Welsh Biography Down to 1940. Cardiff: William Lewis.
- Smith, David; Williams, Gareth (1980). Fields of Praise: The Official History of The Welsh Rugby Union. Cardiff: University of Wales Press. ISBN 0-7083-0766-3.
