= Willie Morris (soprano) =

American soprano (born 1907 or 1908)

William Morris (1907 or 1908) was an American soprano who primarily performed on radio.

== Early years ==
Morris's great-grandfather, John Bingle Morris, was a pioneer who built the first business building in Mexico, Missouri, and founded that city. Her father, Fred A. Morris, was president of a bank. When her mother was pregnant, her parents expected to have a baby boy. The child was a girl, but they used the name William anyway.

As a child, Morris listened to her grandmother's music: "She used to play the piano for me constantly," Morris said. Her support along with that of Morris's parents encouraged her to study piano. As time went on her skills developed and the grandmother "would listen by the hour as I played". She received a scholarship to study music at the American Conservatory at Fontainebleau in the summer of 1923.

While she was a student at McMillan High School, Morris studied at the Hardin College and Conservatory of Music in Mexico, Missouri. In 1920 she finished second in State Federation of Music competition in St. Louis. Morris graduated from Hardin in 1926. During her senior year she was named Queen of the May, Apple Blossom Queen at the prom, and the college's most democratic girl. In the fall of 1927 she went to Paris to study with Isadore Phillipe for a year with plans to spend a second year in Berlin and Vienna.

A music critic suggested that Morris should consult with a singing teacher about becoming a singer. Her initial efforts in that regard were unsuccessful, but a meeting with Madame Pierette-Bianco in Rome shifted her focus to singing.

Morris became a student of Madame Pierette-Bianco in Boston and in Rome, as the teacher lived six months of each year in each of those cities. A scholarship from the Stuart Club enabled Morris to continue studying with her in 1931-1932.

== Career ==
After Morris began studying in Boston, she contemplated singing on radio. She visited radio station WEEI, where she auditioned by singing two songs and playing a piano solo. The station gave her a sustaining program, which provided experience but no income. In October 1931 Morris won the women's division of the Atwater Kent Foundation's competition for Massachusetts, becoming eligible to participate in the next-level interstate competition.

In April 1932 Morris, who already was staff accompanist at WEEI, was selected to sing on a series of broadcasts on that station. A station spokesman said that she would add "that needed feminine touch". In 1935 Morris became the featured female singer on the Flying Red Horse Tavern series on CBS, and she joined the cast of Your Hit Parade, specializing in light concert songs.

While Morris was a regular on the Fireside Recitals program on NBC, that network's executives chose her to be "the 1847 girl" on a new program, Musical Camera. She became the soprano soloist on that program, which debuted on October 25, 1936. Other radio programs on which she appeared included Our Home on the Range and Lanny Ross's show.

== Personal life ==
Morris married Stephen G. Crean Jr. at her parents' home in Mexico, Missouri, on May 7, 1938. He operated a chain of hotels in New York.
