= Bill Morris (rugby union, born 1940) =

Welsh rugby union player (born 1940)

William James Bunce Morris (born 21 May 1940) is a former Welsh Rugby Union international player and a competitive sprinter, who was born in Borth, Cardiganshire. He is the third player known as Bill Morris to play for Wales.

Bill Morris attended Aberaeron Bilateral School before attending Cardiff Teacher Training College at the Heath. He played for Aberystwyth RFC. and Llanelli Scarlets 1959-1960 He was recommended to Pontypool for the 1962-63 season by his club and by Pontypool club captain Clive Rowlands. As a winger he played two internationals making his Welsh debut in Scotland v Wales at Murrayfield on 2 February 1963, and his last international appearance was Wales v Ireland in Cardiff on 9 March 1963.

In athletics, Morris won the 100 yards race at the British Indoor Championship in 1962, in 9.8 seconds. He represented Great Britain against Germany in the indoor meeting at Wembley in 1962. Described as running under 'even time' (100 yards in 10 seconds, equivalent to about 11 seconds for 100 metres) "one of the fastest wings in Wales".
