= Bangor RFC =

Welsh rugby union club, based in Bangor, Gwynedd

(Wales) Bangor RFC
- Full name: Bangor Rugby Football Club
- Founded: 1876; 150 years ago
- Location: Bangor; Gwynedd
- Ground: Cae Milltir
- President: His Hon Judge Merfyn Hughes
- Coach: Dickie Brace
- League: WRU Division Three North
- 2013-14: 4th
Team kit

Official website
- www.bangor-rugby.co.uk

Bangor Rugby Football Club (Welsh: Clwb Rygbi Bangor) is a Welsh rugby union team based in Bangor, North Wales. Bangor RFC is a founding member of the Welsh Rugby Union. The club fields a Seniors, Youth, Juniors and Ladies teams.

== History ==
Bangor RFC was formed in 1876, with three players in the team who would eventually represent their country, Hugh Vincent, Charles Allen and Godfrey Darbishire. In 1881 Bangor RFC sent representatives to the Castle Hotel in Neath where they were one of the clubs that formed the Welsh Rugby Union. That same year Bangor RFC player Godfrey Darbishire played in the first Welsh international against England.

All competitive rugby ceased in Wales after the outbreak of World War I, and Bangor RFC disbanded. Although rugby was played after the War it wasn't until 1929 that Bangor RFC reformed and played in the North Wales Rugby Union league. Bangor RFC were based in Beaumaris on the Isle of Anglesey until 1962, when they moved to The Wern on Caernarfon Road, Bangor. The Club relocated again in 1995 to its current base in Llandygai. The club has helped develop 8 Welsh internationals and 3 British Lions. Former player Tony Gray was coach of the Triple Crown winning Welsh National side in 1988.

== Present day ==
The 1st XV is currently playing in SWALEC Division 3 North.

== Players of note ==
- (Wales) Charles Peter Allen (2 caps)
- (Wales) Godfrey Darbishire (1 cap)
- (Wales) Sir Hugh Corbet Vincent (1 cap)
- (Wales) Robin McBryde (37 caps) (British & Irish Lion)
- (Wales) Stuart Roy (1 cap)
- Tony Gray (2 caps) (former Wales coach)
- (Italy) Roland de Marigny (19 caps)
- (Wales) Geoff Evans (7 caps) (British & Irish Lion)
- (Wales) Dewi Bebb (34 caps) (British & Irish Lion)
- (South Africa) Guy Manson-Bishop (Barbarians, London Scottish, Sale & Leicester)
- (South Africa) Gavin Whittingham (Glasgow Warriors & Natal U21s)
- (South Africa) Morne Snyman (Griquas & Natal U21s)
- (New Zealand) Shane Fletcher (Horowhenua) (Current North Canterbury Coach)

== Rugby League ==
- (Scotland) Phil Veivers (1 cap)
- (England) Chris Byrne (GB Students)
- (England) Ben Barton (Huddersfield Giants)
