= Llanidloes RFC =

(Wales) Llanidloes RFC
- Full name: Llanidloes Rugby Football Club
- Nickname: Llani
- Founded: 1975
- Location: Llanidloes, Wales
- Ground(s): Cae Hafren, SY18 6LQ
- Chairman: Mark Sargent
- Coach: Jordan Davies
- Captain: James Plumridge
- League: WRU Division Two North
Team kit

Llanidloes Rugby Football Club is a rugby union team from the town of Llanidloes, mid Wales. Llanidloes RFC is a member of the Welsh Rugby Union and is a feeder club for RGC.

The Rugby club, based at Cae Hafren, is also a venue for larger, more significant rugby matches and events than the league games on Saturdays. Llanidloes RFC also fields teams from U8 - Youth age including girls teams.
