= Billy Morris (footballer, born 1920) =

Welsh footballer

Personal information
- Full name: William Henry Morris
- Date of birth: 28 September 1920
- Place of birth: Swansea, Wales
- Date of death: March 1994 (aged 73)
- Place of death: Swansea, Wales
- Position: Outside left

Senior career*
Years	Team	Apps	(Gls)
1946–1949	Swansea Town	16	(1)
1949–1951	Brighton & Hove Albion	28	(4)
- Llanelli
- * Club domestic league appearances and goals

William Henry Morris (28 September 1920 – March 1994) was a Welsh professional footballer who played as an outside left in the Football League for Swansea Town and Brighton & Hove Albion.

== Life and career ==
Morris was born in 1920 in Swansea. He represented his country at schoolboy level, and turned professional with Swansea Town in May 1946. He was already 27 years old when he made his Football League debut in January 1948, and contributed to Swansea's Third Division South title the following season. He moved on to another Southern Section club, Brighton & Hove Albion, in September 1949. He scored 4 goals from 31 appearances before returning to Wales where he played for Llanelli. Morris settled in Swansea, where he died in March 1994 at the age of 73.
