= W. W. Morris =

British painter

William Walker Morris
- Born: 11 March 1832; Weaverham
- Died: between 1867 and 1881 (aged 34 to 59)
- Known for: Painting

William Walker Morris (born 11 March 1832) was a British nineteenth-century painter of the Victorian period who worked in Greenwich and Deptford, England, and was known particularly for his bucolic genre oil paintings depicting sporting and homestead life, with an emphasis on hunting dogs. His works draw upon the imagery of life in the Scottish Highlands. He died at some time from 1867 to 1881.

== Life ==
Morris was born in Weaverham, Cheshire, England to John C. Morris and Jane Morris, the first of seven children. His siblings were Alfred (1834), Harriet (1839), Ann (1841), Sarah (1843), Robert (1845), John (1847), and James (1849). He grew up in a household that was consumed by art. His father was a noted painter himself, allowing W. W. Morris to learn his craft at a very young age directly from the hand of his father. In the Census of England of 1851, both John C. Morris and W. W. Morris have as occupation "Painter". In the Census of England of 1861, John C. Morris's occupation is further clarified as "Sheep painter". In the Census of England of 1871, W. W. Morris's brother John William Morris, has as occupation listed "Artist", who was then already married and a father of a one-year-old child, and by 1881 John William has listed as occupation "Animal artist". Similarly, W. W. Morris's brother Alfred was a painter, listed in The Royal Academy of Arts: A Complete Dictionary, along with W. W. Morris and John C. Morris.

While little is known of his W. W. Morris's life, by just eighteen years of age he was demonstrating high artistic skill, with one work, "The Task" (1850), displayed by the Royal Academy of Arts (RAA). His acclaim grew during his twenties and thirties, with additional works being exhibited by the RAA, including "The Match Seller" (1851), "The Pets" (1854), "Left in Charge" (1855), "The Shepard's Devotion" (1855), "The Gamekeeper's Son" (1856), and "Sketches from Life" (1867). Not surprisingly, his works were often exhibited alongside his father's, who himself between 1851 and 1862 had nine works exhibited by the RAA, a number of these coinciding by date and location with W. W. Morris's own works. W. W. Morris's brother Alfred Morris also exhibited works at the RAA, and many of his works have survived in private collections and sold at auction in both Europe and the United States.

The National Trust has in its permanent collection one of Morris’s works, housed at Anglesey Abbey, “The Milk Stall”, and the Williamson Art Gallery and Museum houses “Bidston Heath”.

Several of Morris's works have survived in private collections as well, dating between 1850 through his death. His oil paintings have been offered at Christie’s and Sotheby’s. One such work, "Stalking on the Highlands", suggests that he lived until 1871, challenging the common understanding that he had died in 1867. Another work, “Terriers”, is signed 1874. Yet another, “Scotties on a Summit”, reports a date of 1881. However, in the England & Wales, Civil Registration Death Index, 1837–1915, a William Walker Morris is reported to have died in the first quarter of 1867, in Wandsworth, London.

== Selected surviving works ==
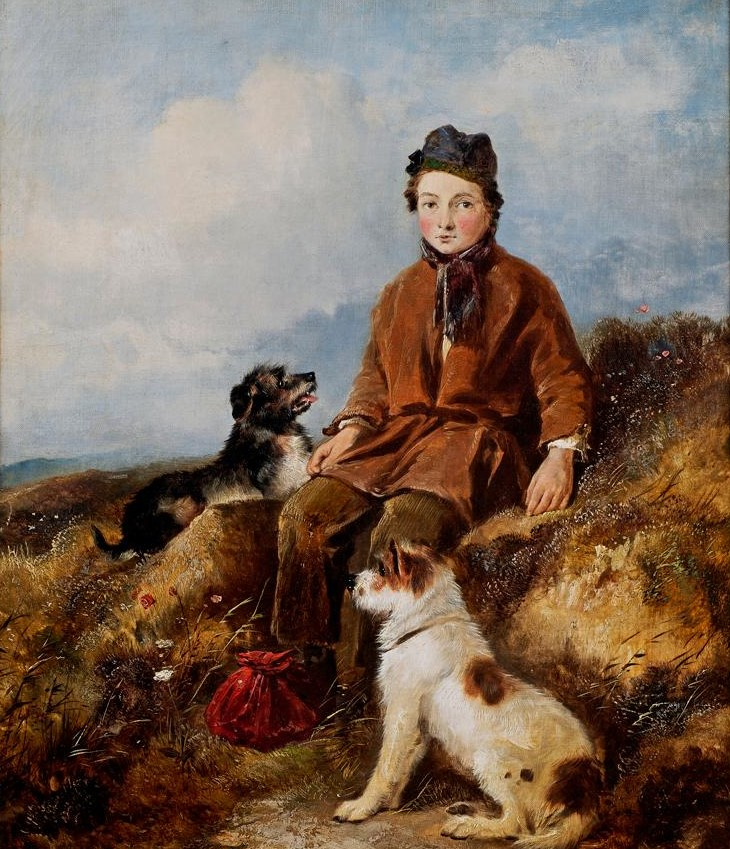
"Rest on the Way", signed and dated "W.W. Morris 1861", oil on canvas, 24 × 20 in. (61.0 × 50.8 cm)

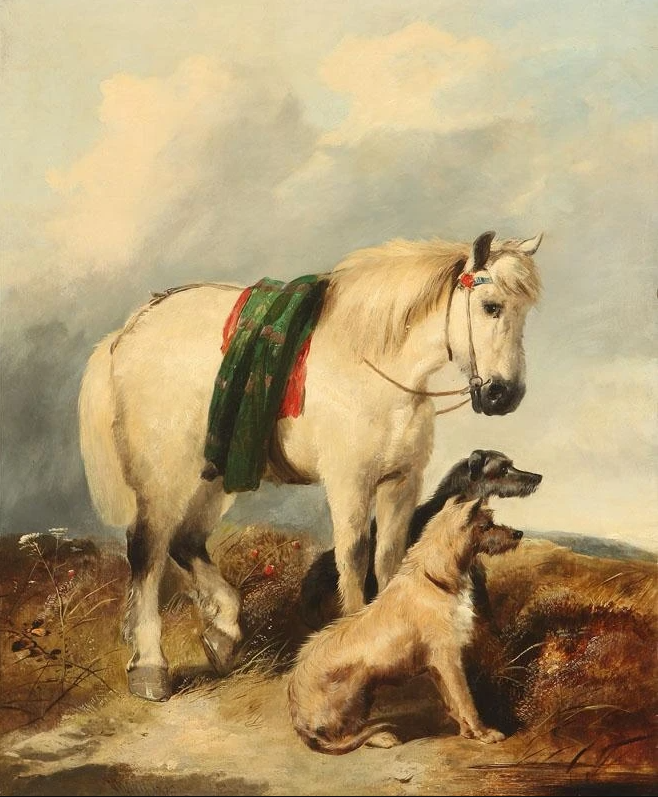
"Pony and Two Deerhounds", signed W. W. Morris, oil on canvas, 30 × 25 in. (76.0 × 63.5 cm)

- “The Milk Stall” (1852)
- “The Gamekeeper’s Son” (1856)
- ”A Cottage Interior with Child, Dog, and Baby" (1856)
- “Bidston Heath” (1857)
- “The Young Gamekeeper” (1861)
- “A Chat with the Young Gamekeeper” (1861)
- “A Rest on the Way” (1861)
- “Highlanders with Their Dogs” (1863)
- “The Day’s Bag”, no. 1 (1865)
- “The Day’s Bag”, no. 2 (1865)
- “Stalking on the Highlands” (1871)
- “Terriers” (1874)
- “Scotties on a Summit” (1881)
- “Waiting for the Master”
- “Waiting for Master”
- “The Guardian”
- “Boy with Terriers Rabbiting”
- "Boys Fishing while Girl Collects Flowers"
