= Wrexham RFC =

Welsh rugby union club, based in Wrexham

Coordinates: 53°3′15.18″N 2°57′31.21″W

(Wales) Wrexham RFC
- Full name: Wrexham Rugby Football Club
- Location: Wrexham, Wales
- Ground: Bryn Estyn
- League: WRU Division Two North
- 2019–20: 4th
Team kit

Official website
- www.wrexhamrugbyclub.com

Wrexham Rugby Football Club (Welsh: Clwb Rygbi Wrecsam) is a Welsh rugby union team based in Wrexham, Wales. Wrexham RFC is a member of the Welsh Rugby Union. Wrexham was one of the nine founder clubs of the North Wales Rugby Union, which formed at Wrexham in 1931.

== History ==
Wrexham RFC was founded in 1925. In 1931, at a meeting held by Wrexham, the North Wales Rugby Union was founded in January 1931 with nine clubs and affiliation to the Welsh Rugby Union coming in June of the same year. Originally Wrexham had no home ground and played as a nomadic club. This continued until 1946 when they obtained their own ground at Dean Road. In 1976 they moved to their current home ground on Bryn Estyn Lane in 1976 with floodlights being installed a year later.

In 1995, the New Zealand national team player Jonah Lomu made a guest appearance for Wrexham RFC against a North Wales XV in an exhibition match. This was done as a favour to the Wrexham coach Phil Kingsley Jones, who had discovered Lomu as a 14 year old. This was five months after Lomu had appeared for the All Blacks in the 1995 Rugby World Cup final against South Africa and after rugby union had just permitted professionalism.

Following the introduction of regional rugby union teams in Wales, Wrexham's coach led criticism of the fact that there was no professional regional team permanently based in North Wales. In 2013, Wrexham won the WRU Division Three North title. Until 2002, Wrexham RFC had run a ladies rugby team. The ladies side of the club was resurrected in 2019.
