= Rhyl and District RFC =

Welsh rugby team

(Wales) Rhyl and District RFC
- Full name: Rhyl and District Rugby Football Club
- Founded: 1928
- Location: Rhyl, Wales
- Ground: Tynewydd Field
- Chairman: Tony Evans
- Coach: Dale Blackmore
- League: WRU Division 2 North
Team kit

Official website
- rhylanddistrict.rfc.wales

Rhyl and District Rugby Football Club (Welsh: Clwb Rygbi y Rhyl A'r Cylch) is a rugby union club in Rhyl, North Wales. Rhyl and District RFC is a member of the Welsh Rugby Union and is a feeder club for the Llanelli Scarlets.

The club fields Senior and Second men's teams, a women's team; as well as a full range of mini and junior squads (from under 7 to under 16), a Youth team and the "Mini Dragons" from age 5+.
