= Frank Shayler =

Frank Hearn Shayler
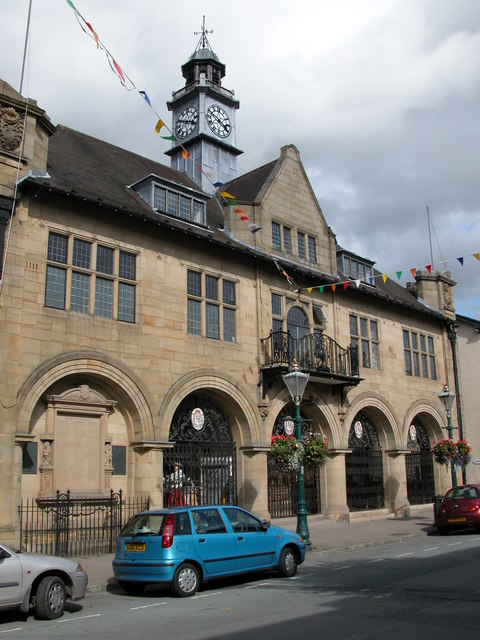
- Llanidloes Town Hall by Frank Shayler 1908
- Born: 1867; Banbury, Oxfordshire, England
- Died: 1954 (aged 86–87); Shrewsbury, Shropshire, England
- Education: Science and Arts Schools at Banbury and New Cross, London
- Occupation: Architect
- Practice: Shayler and Ridge
- Buildings: Llanidloes Town Hall; Free Library, Newtown.

Frank Hearn Shayler (1867–1954) was a Shrewsbury-based architect who worked in an Arts and Crafts style. He was in partnership with Thomas Ridge, and they also had offices in Oswestry and Welshpool.

== Career ==
Born in Banbury, Oxfordshire, son of Joseph (a solicitor) and Harriette Shayler, he was originally articled in 1884 to Edwin Lawrence Elgar of Ramsgate and then studied at the Science and Arts Schools at Banbury and New Cross, London. In 1890 he joined the practice of W H Spaull in Welshpool and formed a partnership with Spaull in 1893 but shortly afterwards formed his own practice at Bridge House in Welshpool and at Oswestry. In 1899 he married (and later divorced) Aimée Alberta Swayne and moved to Clive Chambers in Shrewsbury, then in 1902 built a house for himself at the Mount. In 1909 he was remarried to Annie Mabel Randall. He continued his offices in Welshpool and Oswestry in partnerships with Madoc-Jones and Henry Ridge. His main practice was in Shrewsbury, later taking into partnership Francis Milverton Drake and J Stuart Wilkes. This partnership was dissolved in October 1933.

== Works include ==
=== Chapels ===
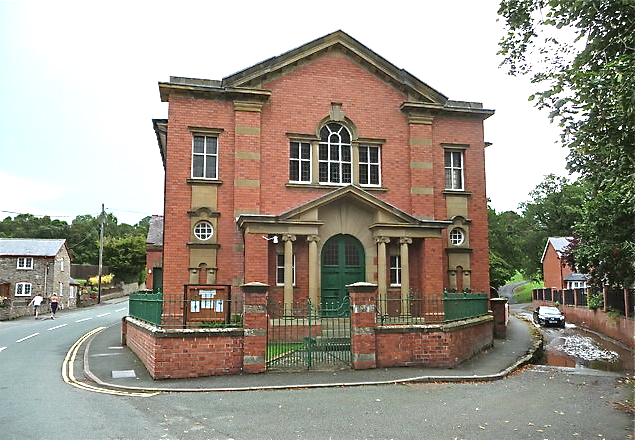
Tabernacle Wesleyan Methodist Chapel by Shayler and Ridge 1904

- Llanfyllin Tabernacle Wesleyan Methodist Chapel. Wrenaissance Style with double columned Ionic entrance of Cefn stone, with Venetian Window above, by Shayler and Ridge 1904.

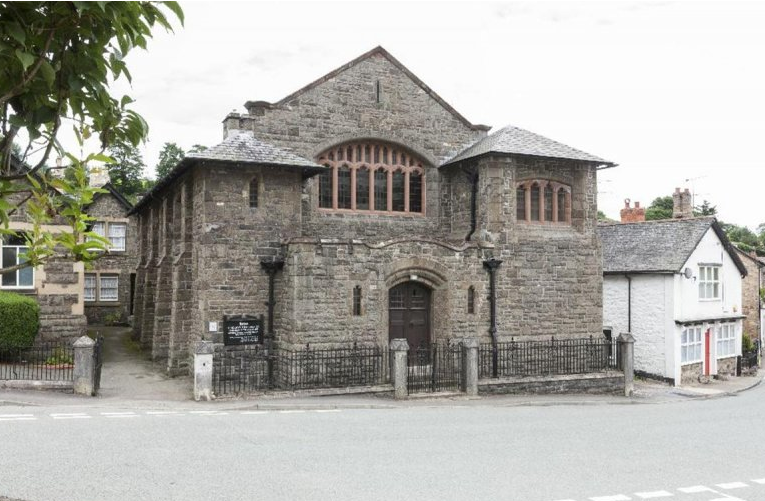
Seion Methodist Chapel, Llanrhaeadr-ym-Mochnant

- Llanrhaeadr ym Mochnant Seion Wesleyan Chapel, by Shayler and Ridge, 1904. Seion Methodist Chapel, Llanrhaeadr-ym-mochnant, was first opened 1834, classrooms were added in 1870, a chapel house and detached Sunday School in 1892. The present chapel is a rebuild dated 1904, designed by architects Shayler and Ridge of Oswestry. It is a stone-built, slate-roofed chapel, built in the Arts & Crafts Gothic style with a gable entry plan. Seion is now Grade II* Listed as an unusually fine Arts and Crafts chapel design which is amongst the best in Wales.
- Montgomery Baptist Chapel. Princes Street. By Shayler and Edmunds. 1900. Demolished 1966.

=== Restoration of Historic Buildings ===
- Machynlleth Glyndwr Parliament Building. Possibly restored this for Lord Davies at the same time as the building of the adjacent Glyndwr Institute.

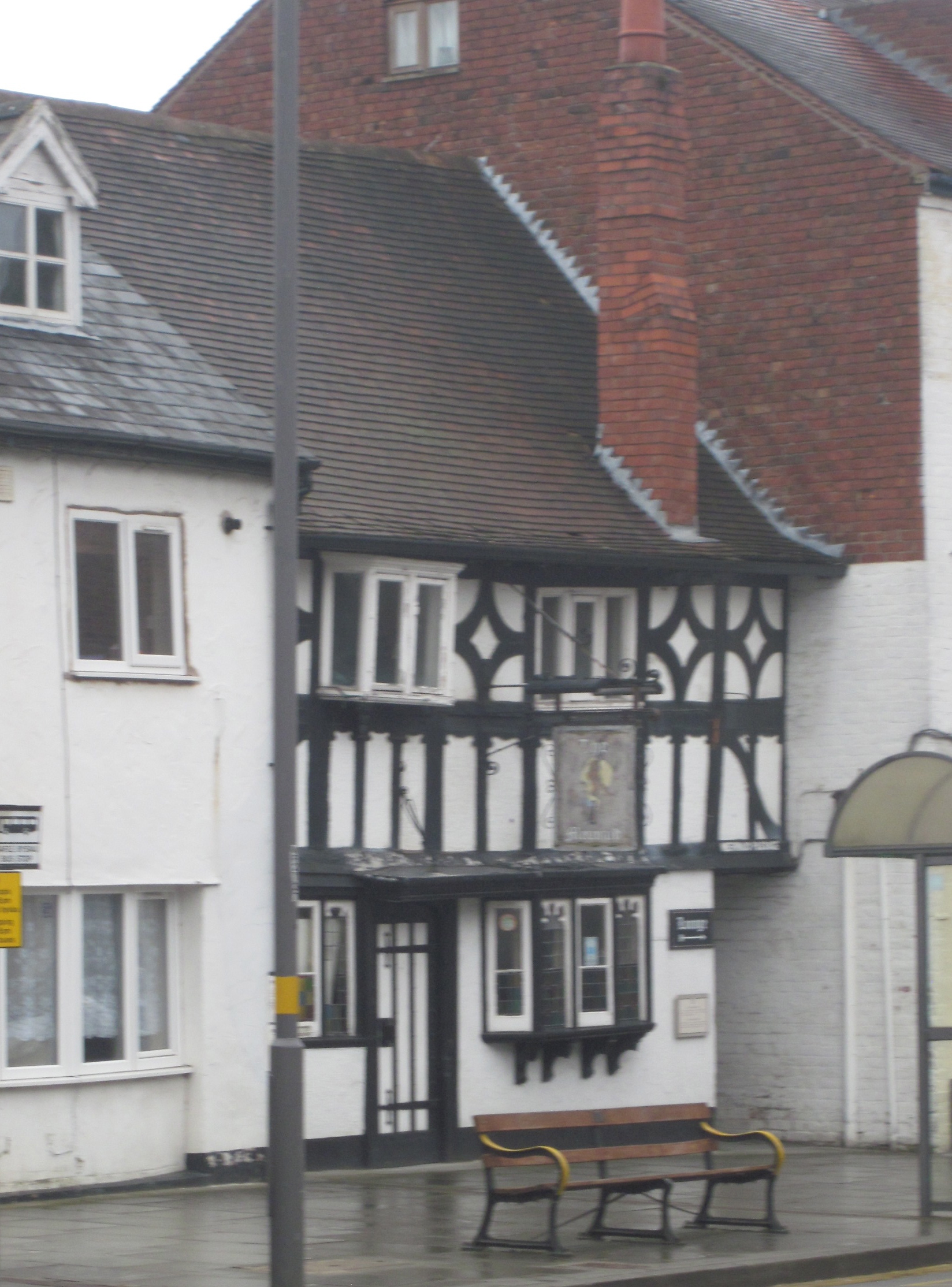
Mermaid Inn, Welshpool

- Welshpool The Mermaid Inn, 28 High Street, Welshpool. Very probably an early 16th-century merchant's house, placed on a burgage plot between the High Street and Alfred Jones Court. Timber-framed building with long storehouse or wing to the rear. The frontage was remodelled c1890, by Shayler. Early illustrations of the building show that prior to this it had a thatched roof, and that the timbering was not exposed. Two bay building. Passage to side with heavy box-framing in square panels, with brick infill exposed in side elevation and in rear wing. The frontage has been exposed by Shayler to show decorative timber work on the upper storey, divided by a middle rail, with cusped close-studding below, and quatrefoils above. Inside a room in frontage range has ceiling with transverse and axial beams, all with step-stopped chamfers. Similar stop-chamfered joists.

=== Public Buildings ===
Shropshire

- Wem Public Library, Aston Street. 1905

Montgomeryshire

- Llanidloes. Broad Street, Town Hall, Shayler and Ridge 1908. Faced in Cefn stone from Minera.

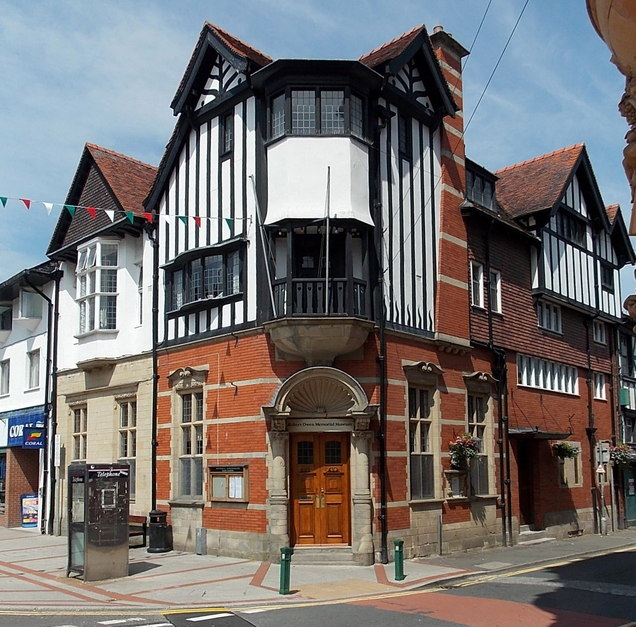
Robert Owen Memorial Museum, Newtown. Former Free Library bt Frank Shayler 1902.

- Newtown former Free Library, Newtown 1902. – now contains Robert Owen Museum. The Broad Street frontage was funded by the Co-operative movement while the Art Nouveau frontage, partly facing ?? was funded by public subscription frontage

=== Bank ===
- Oswestry. National Provincial Bank (Abbey National) 1905-6

=== Schools ===
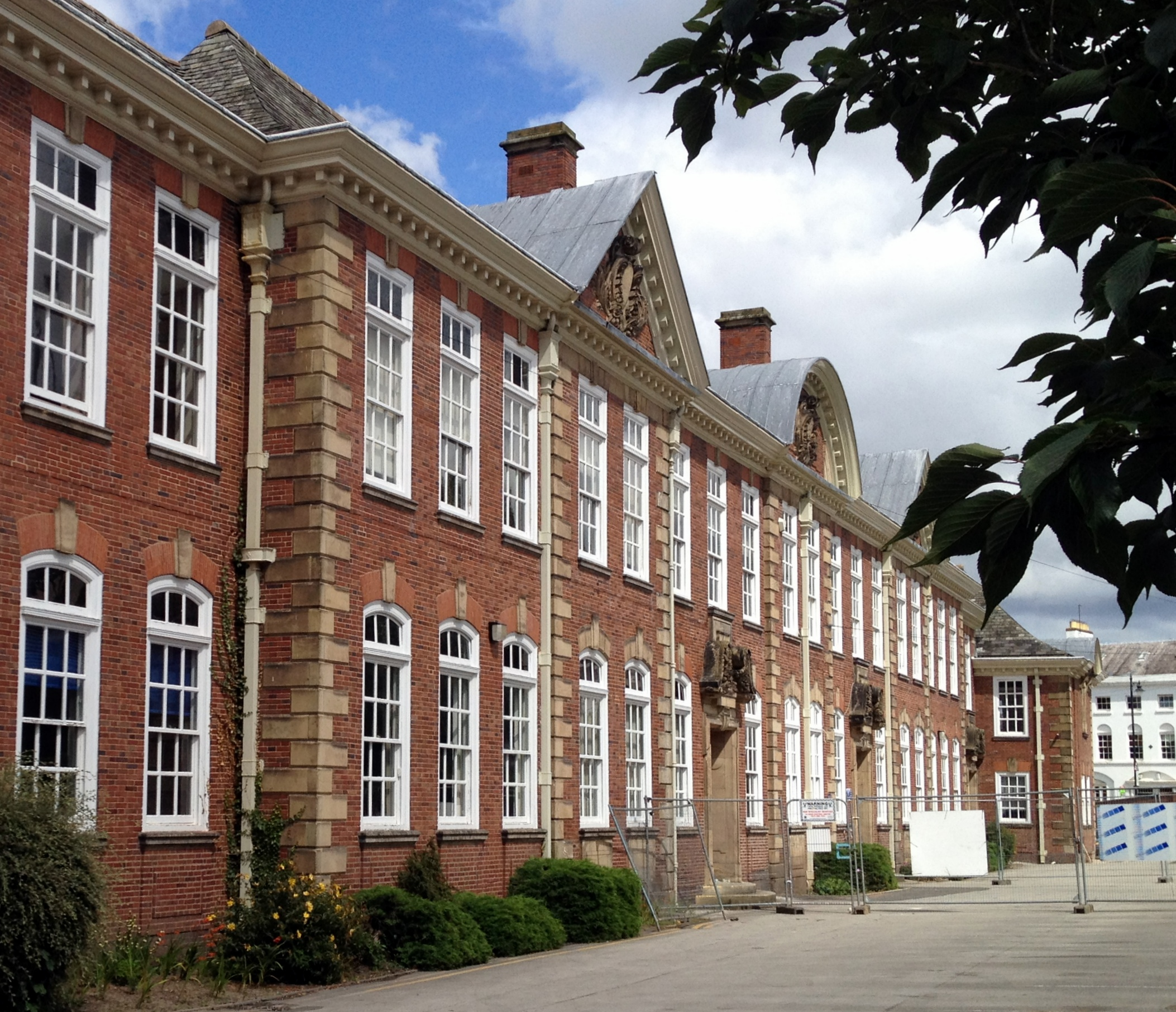
Priory Road- Sixth Form College, (F Shayler and J A Swan). 1910-1

- Shrewsbury, Priory Road- Now Sixth Form College, (F Shayler and J A Swan). William & Mary Style 1910-1
- Telford New College, King Street (former Girls High School) (F Shayler and J A Swan) 1911–2.

=== Houses ===
Shropshire

- Bridgnorth Wenlock Road. Group of houses Graycott /Garth
- Gobowen The Old Rectory.
- Oswestry Morda Road (attributed) Villas: Mair Wen Edenholme.
- Shrewsbury: The Mount, (South side) Nos.71, 73 AND 75 The Red House (73)Terrace of 3 houses. Dated 1902. By Frank Shayler, No.73, The Red House, for himself. Red brick with some tile hanging and plain tile roof with brick ridge and end stacks. Arts and Crafts style.
- Shrewsbury Shelton. Group of Arts and Crafts House in a 1920s development.

Montgomeryshire

- Montgomery, Chirbury Road Tre Llydiart,

Wrexham

- Pentre Bychan, an attractive pair of houses of rustic brick beneath sand-faced clay tiles on Pentre Bychan Road, in the grounds of the former Pentrebychan Hall. 1936 and developed speculatively. Originally intended to be a group of twelve, but sales were slow due to being marketed at a relatively high value. As a consequence, only two were built with construction subsequently halted by the Second World War.

== Literature ==
- Antonia Brodie (ed), Directory of British Architects, 1834–1914: 2 Vols, British Architectural Library, Royal Institute of British Architects, 2001
- J Newman and N Pevsner The Buildings of England: Shropshire, Yale 2006,
- R Scourfield and R Haslam The Buildings of Wales: Powys; Montgomeryshire, Radnorshire and Breconshire, Yale University Press 2013.
