= William Morice (Archdeacon of Armagh) =

William Morice was Archdeacon of Armagh in 1365: he appears again in 1369.
