= William Charles Morris =

American political cartoonist

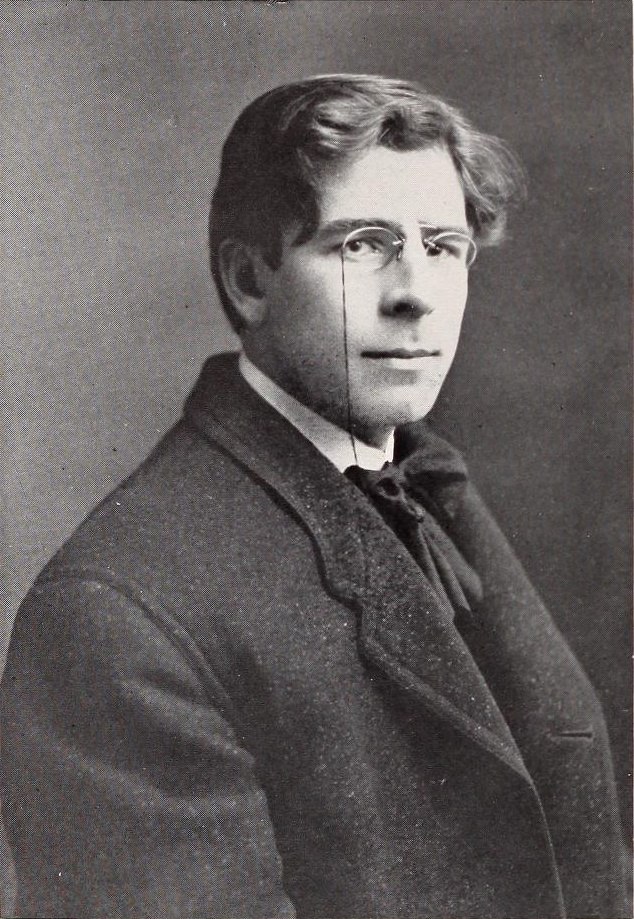
- Morris in 1908
- Born: March 6, 1874; Salt Lake City, Utah
- Died: April 10, 1940 (aged 66); Nyack, New York, U.S.
- Occupation: Cartoonist

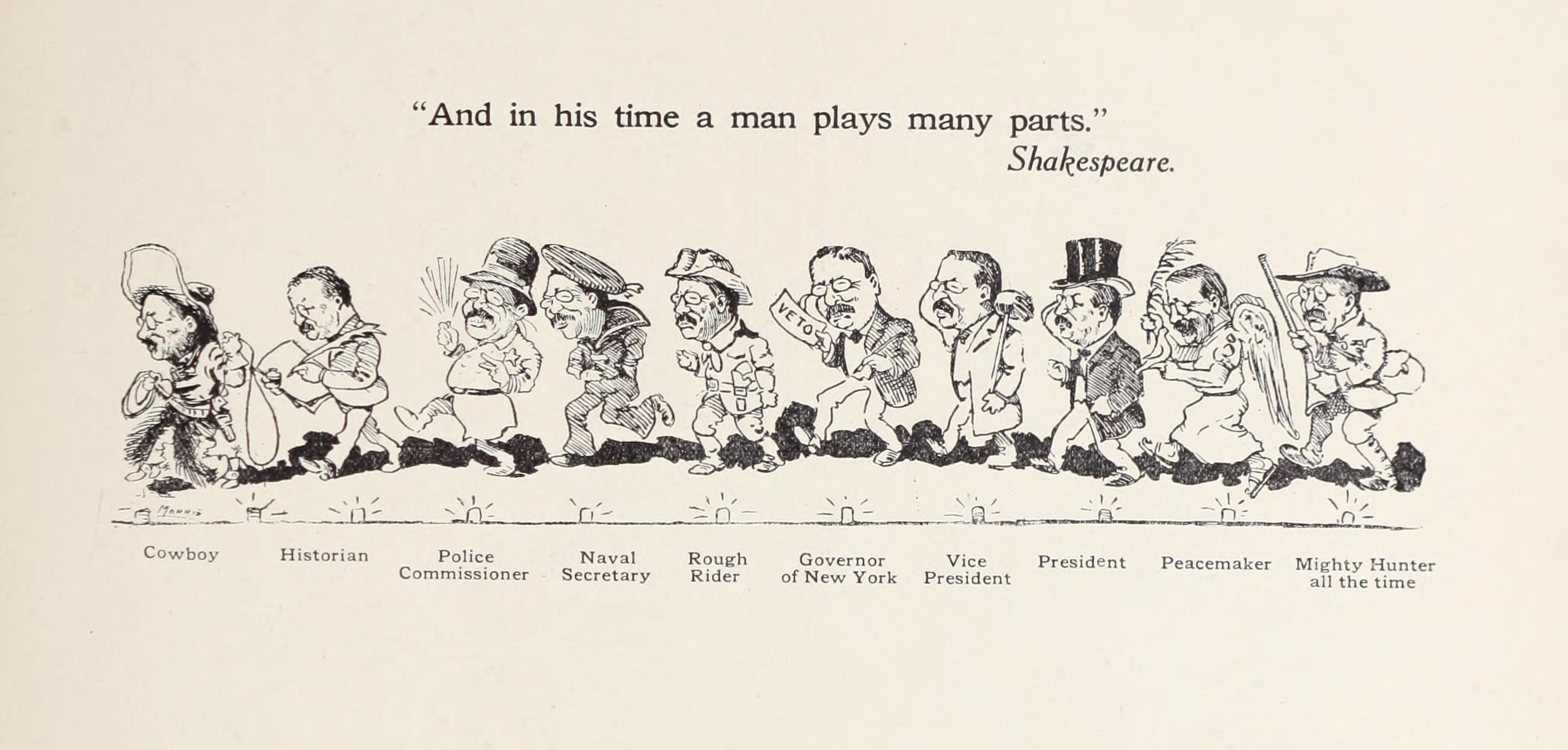
The many roles of Theodore Roosevelt, a cartoon by Morris, circa 1906 to 1908

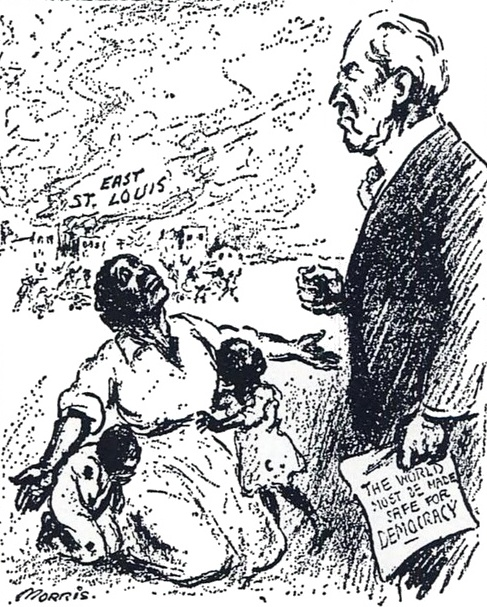
A 1917 political cartoon by Morris on the East St. Louis massacres

William Charles Morris (March 6, 1874 – April 10, 1940) was an American political cartoonist.

Born in Salt Lake City, Utah, Morris began his career with the Salt Lake Herald and later worked as cartoonist with The Spokesman-Review in Spokane, from 1904 to 1913. He later worked for the New-York Tribune, New York Mail, George Matthew Adams' syndicate, and Harper's Weekly.

He was on the publicity staff of the Republican National Committee during the 1936 presidential campaign.

He died of heart attack at Nyack, New York, April 10, 1940, at age 66.
