= Welshpool RFC =

(Wales) Welshpool RFC
- Full name: Welshpool Rugby Football Club
- Founded: 1926
- Location: Welshpool, Wales
- Ground(s): Maes y Dre Recreation Ground
- Chairman: Jake Best
- Coach(es): Daley Jones
- Captain(s): Ryan Goodwin
- League(s): WRU Division Two North
Team kit

Welshpool Rugby Football Club (Welsh: Clwb Rygbi'r Trallwng) is a rugby union club based in the Mid Wales town of Welshpool, whose first XV play in the Welsh Rugby Union National League, Division 2 North.

The club also run a 2nd XV, a Women's side, Youth team, a Junior section for players aged 4–16 and two joint girls sides at Under 15s and Under 18s.

The club was founded in 1926, before later being disbanded and reformed in 1967. The club's playing field is based at the Maes y Dre recreation ground in Welshpool. Changing facilities and clubhouse are shared with the local cricket club.

The club's traditional home colours are navy blue and white; although the 1st XV are currently playing in a home navy and white kit from VX3 and a white away kit from VX3 the main club sponsor is Trederwen Springs.

The club captain for the 2024-25 season is Ryan Goodwin.

The 1st XV have earned promotion to Division 1 North for the 2025/26 season with an impressive 3 league games still to play.

== History ==
Since reforming in 1967, Welshpool Rugby Club has become both a member of the Mid Wales District Rugby Union and the Welsh Rugby Union, which the club joined in 1992. At other times in the club's history it has also been a member of the North Wales Rugby Union and the Shropshire Rugby Union.

In the club's early days, there were no other clubs in the Montgomeryshire area, so most fixtures took place against sides from Shropshire: the club's first fixture after reformation was a 23-14 victory over Shrewsbury Wednesdays, and the 1967-68 fixture list included fixtures against English sides such as Bridgnorth and Newport (Salop) Rugby Union Football Club, as well as Welsh opposition such as Builth Wells, Aberystwyth and Ruthin. To the current day, the club still play regularly against Shrewsbury and Oswestry in the pre-season. As more clubs were formed or re-formed in Mid Wales towns such as Newtown and Llandrindod Wells (both of whom played their inaugural fixtures against Welshpool), more fixtures came to be played against Mid Wales opposition, with the club being involved in the Mid Wales League from its earliest seasons, and where the club's 2nd XV participated for many years.

Like many clubs, however, Welshpool wished to become a full member of the WRU, and was granted membership in the early 1990s, initially competing against teams from all over Wales in Divisions 7 and 8, before becoming a part of the new North Wales league structure, in which they competed in the North Wales Division Two alongside teams such as C.O.B.R.A., Machynlleth and Rhyl, before suffering relegation to Division Three for the 2011-12 season.

Since the struggles of the 2011-12 season, the club has begun an ambitious rebuilding program, and they now run a dozen regular sides at all ages. The club now has two full-sized playing fields with additional training areas, and plans are being worked on to redevelop other club facilities to accommodate the surge in player numbers.

Welshpool Rugby Club hosted the first mixed sex T1 Rugby to be televised, with the event being covered for S4C. The match was against Oswestry Rugby Club, and took place on the 13th of December 2023.

The clubs official fan club ‘The Ultras’ was formed at the start of the 2024/25 season by founding members Ryan Manuel, Harry Gannon & Little Bov.
