= Llanidloes =

Town in Powys, Wales

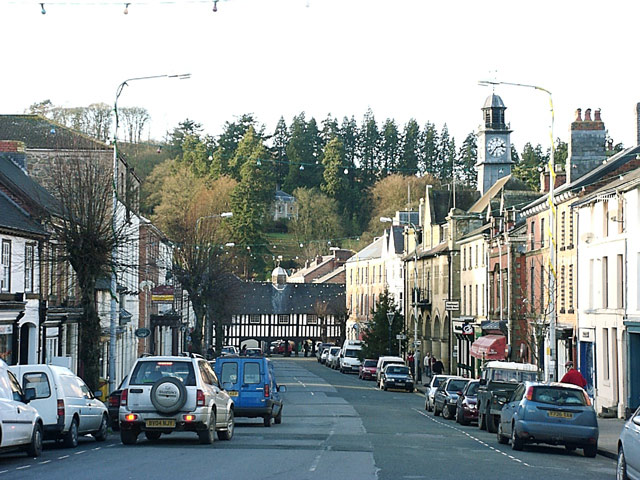

- Location within Powys
- Population: 2,929
- OS grid reference: SN954845
  - London: 211 miles (340 km) ESE
- Community: Llanidloes
- Principal area: Powys
- Preserved county: Powys
- Country: Wales
- Sovereign state: United Kingdom
- Post town: LLANIDLOES
- Postcode district: SY18
- Dialling code: 01686
- Police: Dyfed-Powys
- Fire: Mid and West Wales
- Ambulance: Welsh
- UK Parliament: Montgomeryshire and Glyndŵr
- Senedd Cymru – Welsh Parliament: Gwynedd Maldwyn
- List of places UK Wales Powys 52.449°N 3.5402°W Community map: Map of the community

Llanidloes (Welsh pronunciation: [ɬanˈɪdlɔɨs]) is a town and community on the A470 and B4518 roads in Powys, within the historic county boundaries of Montgomeryshire (Welsh: Sir Drefaldwyn), Wales. The population in 2011 was 2,929, of whom 15% could speak Welsh. It is the third largest settlement in Montgomeryshire, after Newtown and Welshpool.

It is the first town on the River Severn (Welsh: Afon Hafren), counting from the source. The town's Member of Parliament is Steve Witherden of the Labour Party (MP since 2024) and its Member of the Senedd is Russell George of the Conservatives (MS since 2011).

== Surroundings ==
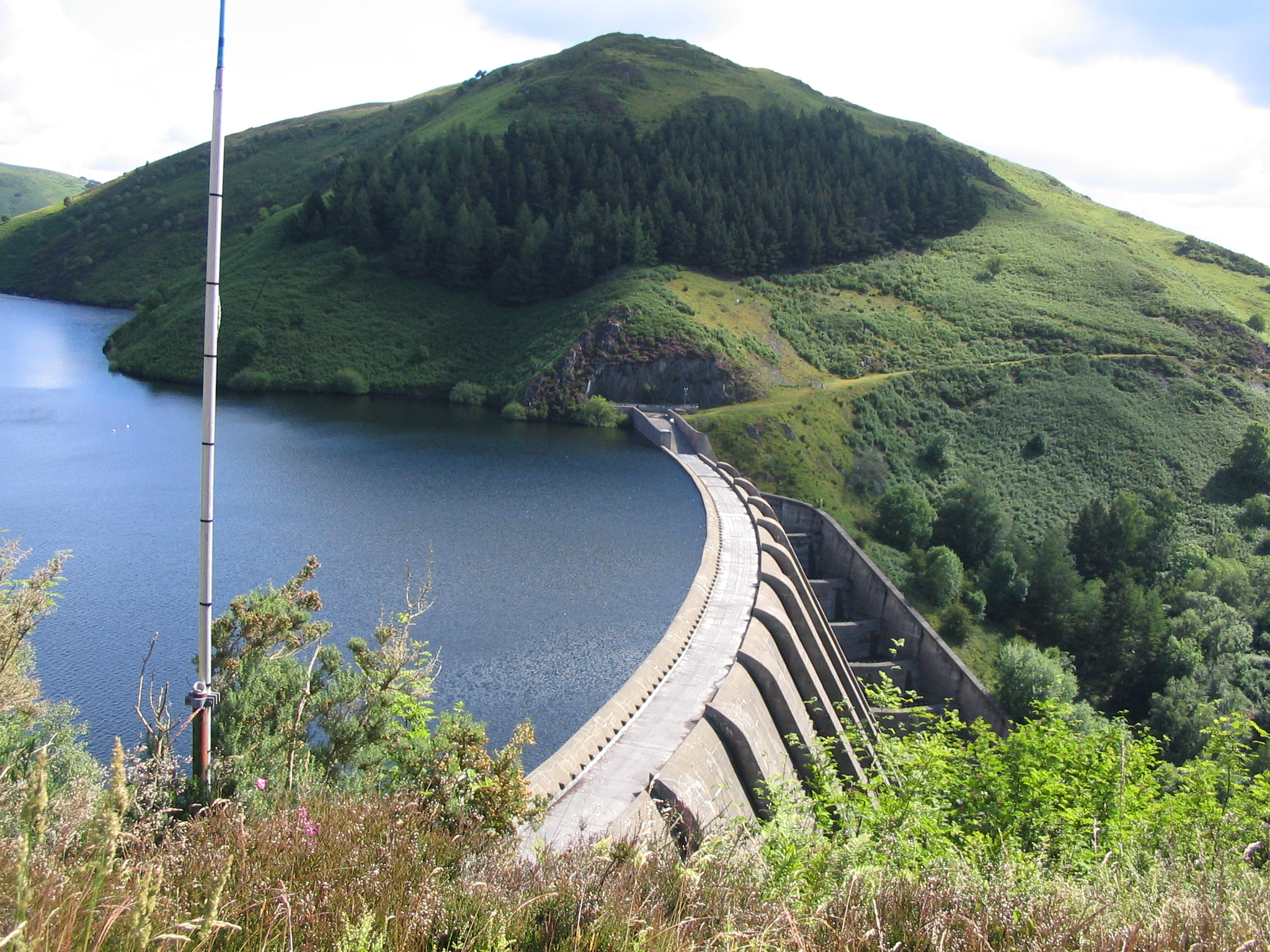
The Clywedog Dam on the Llyn Clywedog

The town is close to the large dam and reservoir Llyn Clywedog. There is a scenic mountain road connecting Machynlleth and Llanidloes.

Llanidloes is popular with hikers who walk on the scenic footpaths surrounding the town, including Glyndŵr's Way, which in conjunction with the Offa's Dyke path forms a 160-mile circuit around Mid Wales and local passage over the spine of the Cambrian Mountains.

The Sarn Sabrina Walk – a 25-mile circular walk from Llanidloes to the source of the Severn and back – has been held yearly on the Saturday preceding the Late Spring Bank Holiday since 2006. In 2007 the Semi Sabrina, a 12-mile circular walk, was added. The Hafren Forest is also used for car rallies such as Rally GB and motorcycle Enduro events throughout the year.

== History ==
Llanidloes takes its name from the early 7th century Celtic Saint Idloes (Llan-Idloes = the Parish of St Idloes), after whom its parish church is named. The village hall is the centre of Wales. The town was then part of the cantref of Arwystli. In 1280 Llanidloes received a market charter from the king (granted to Owen de la Pole) and benefited from Edwardian town planning and earthwork defences. The present-day street plan follows the 13th century grid layout. O'Neill traced earth bank defences from the confluence of the Severn with the Clywedog and along Brook Street on the north, beyond High Street on the east, and along Mount Street on the south; with the Severn forming the western boundary. He suggested that the medieval castle with its bailey lay immediately to the south in the area of Mount Street. However, the precise position of the castle and earthen bank defences needs to be verified by archaeological evidence. The town prospered and was granted borough status in 1344. Revival after the Glyndŵr Rising was slow, but there were 59 taxpayers in 1545.

The following centuries saw the growth of weaving and flannel production. This was essentially a cottage industry, and the local products were sent to market at Shrewsbury in England. Towards the end of the 18th century, Llanidloes was the largest producer in Montgomeryshire, but after about 1810, with the introduction of factories, which brought all the processes under one roof, Newtown gradually overtook Llanidloes as the main centre. Some of the three-storey houses with brick façades of this period would have housed weaving lofts on the upper storey. Lewis's Topographical Dictionary of 1833 noted that there were forty carding engines, eighteen fulling mills and thirty-five thousand spindles .. affording considerable employment in Llanidloes. However, the new technology was far from profitable, and the factory system led to increasing unrest, which culminated in the Chartist riots in 1839. Newtown, connected to the Montgomeryshire Canal in 1819, soon became the centre of the flannel industry in Wales with the opening of its Flannel Exchange in 1832. Llanidloes followed suit in 1838 when former Public Rooms in Great Oak Street were built by a local consortium as a Flannel Exchange; but this only lasted a few years, although Llanidloes flannel was regarded as better quality. Some owners, particularly Thomas Jones, who owned the Cambrian and Spring Mills, struggled to promote the Llanidloes flannel industry.

Lead mining became the more profitable industry from 1865, when rich deposits were discovered at the Van mines. By 1876, the mines were among the most productive in the world, employing over 500. Important too was the town's iron foundry, established in 1851. This second phase of prosperity is well reflected in the townscape, most notably in the proliferation of fine chapels, built during the 1870s. Commercial success is reflected by the many fine shopfronts that survive from the later part of the 19th century; but again decline set in: printing and tanning gained in importance, but the last of the mines closed in 1921. Little has changed since then, except the building of houses, including a Garden Suburb and a new school. The building of the by-pass in 1991, along the track of the former railway, has largely protected the town from the ravages of traffic. Llanidloes has attractive tree-lined main streets, originally planted in 1901, although many of the trees have been replaced.

=== The Chartist uprising ===
Llanidloes was notorious as a focus of industrial unrest during the Chartist revolt in 1839, a campaign for democratic rights prompted by the collapse of the local textile industry. During the unrest, three local people were arrested and held in the Trewythen hotel on Great Oak Street until the protesters forced their release. The town was controlled by the protesters until a detachment of South Shropshire Yeomanry arrived on 14 May 1839 and restored Government authority.

== Churches and chapels ==
- The parish church of St Idloes (Church in Wales). The 15th-century tower has walls of large stones 7 ft thick. There is an Early Perpendicular west doorway. Timbered belfry with pyramidal roof, which has been dated to 1594 by tree rings. Inside at belfry level a rib-vault with random slate infill; in its centre is the opening for raising bells. Street rebuilt the north aisle, reusing the early 16th century panel-traceried east window, and replaced the other windows with Perpendicular tracery. Attached to the north-west of the church is the church hall of 1982 by Phillip G. Harrison. The splendid solemn arcade in the aisle is part of the fourteen-bay aisled nave of the Cistercian church at Abbey Cwmhir, some 10 miles SW across the hills. There is no doubt that the material was carted away after the Dissolution of the Monasteries, and re-erected in slightly jumbled order at Llanidloes.
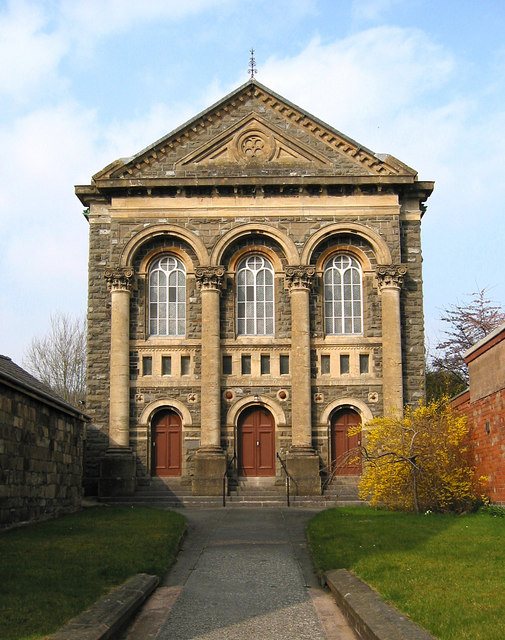
  Sion Chapel, Llanidloes
  The hammer-beam roof is the most elaborate in Montgomeryshire. Hammer beams on carved spandrel-pieces support curved ribs and principals, forming a sort of airy tunnel-vault. The framing is all delicately moulded. This type of roof often dates from the 15th century, but there is no reason to doubt the date of 1542 (on the ninth shield from the NE) as dendrochronology has proved that the timbers were felled in 1538. The corbels are odd masonry pieces including stiff-leaf from Cwmhir. The base of each bracket is carved, with an archer, or grotesque heads. Winged angels holding shields are fixed to each hammer beam.
- Trinity United Reformed Church, Shortbridge Street, formerly Sion Independent Chapel. Built in 1878 by John Humphreys of Swansea, a notable chapel builder. Set back within its plot to great effect. The three-bay façade has giant classical columns carrying arcading, with a pediment above. Rock-faced masonry with a smooth ashlar band over the trio of doorways containing plain lights for the lobby. Tall windows above with Florentine wooden tracery. The varnished pine interior contains raked seating. The gallery, continuous round all four sides, has a band of cast iron foliagework over boarding, with an organ above the pulpit. Pulpit with arcaded front. It cost £1,550 to build.
- Church of Our Lady and St Richard Gwyn (Roman Catholic). Built in the 1950s next to the Franciscan friary on Penygreen Road. First Mass was celebrated at the church on the 18 October 1959.

== Structures in Llanidloes ==
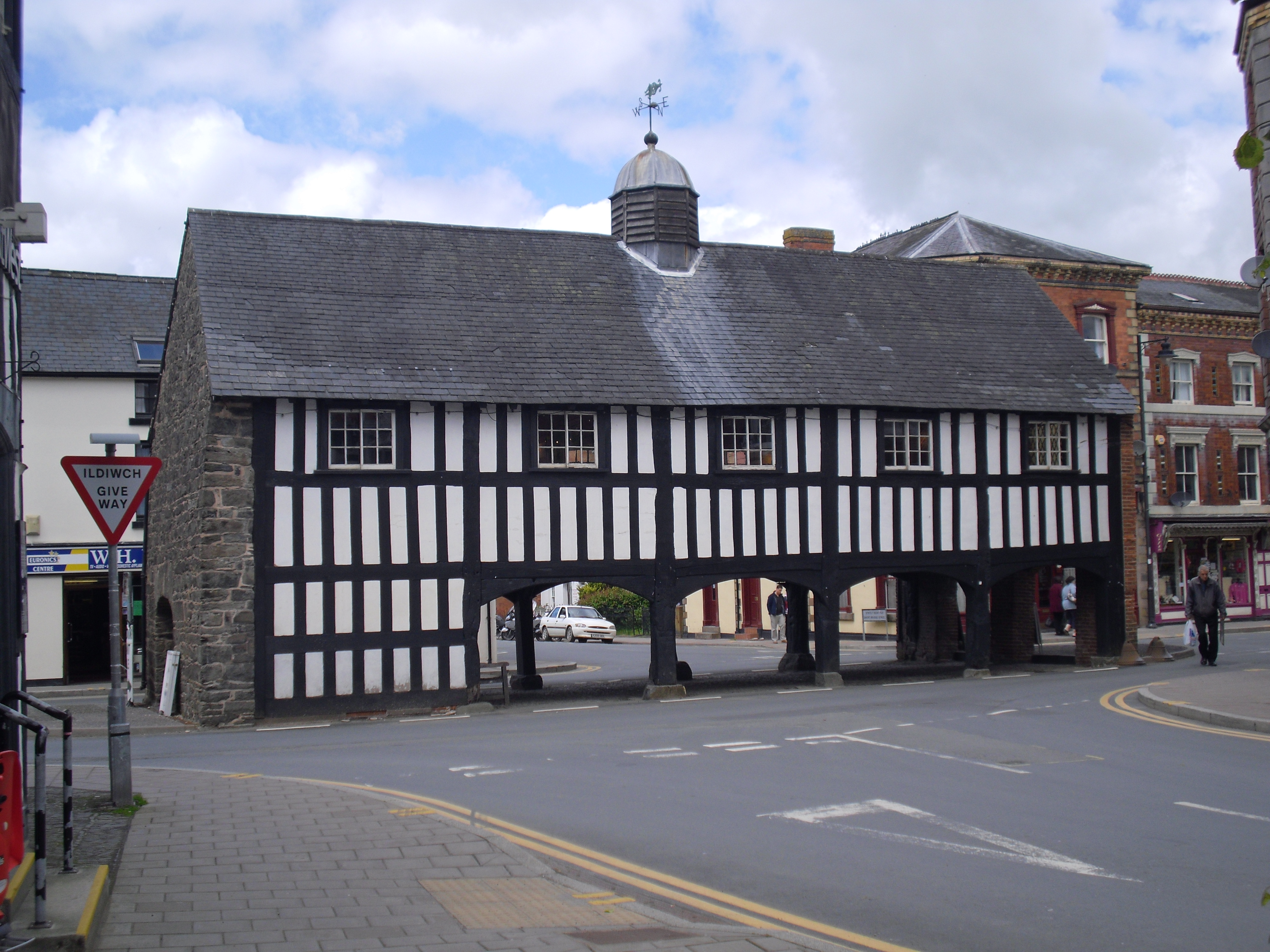
Old Market Hall

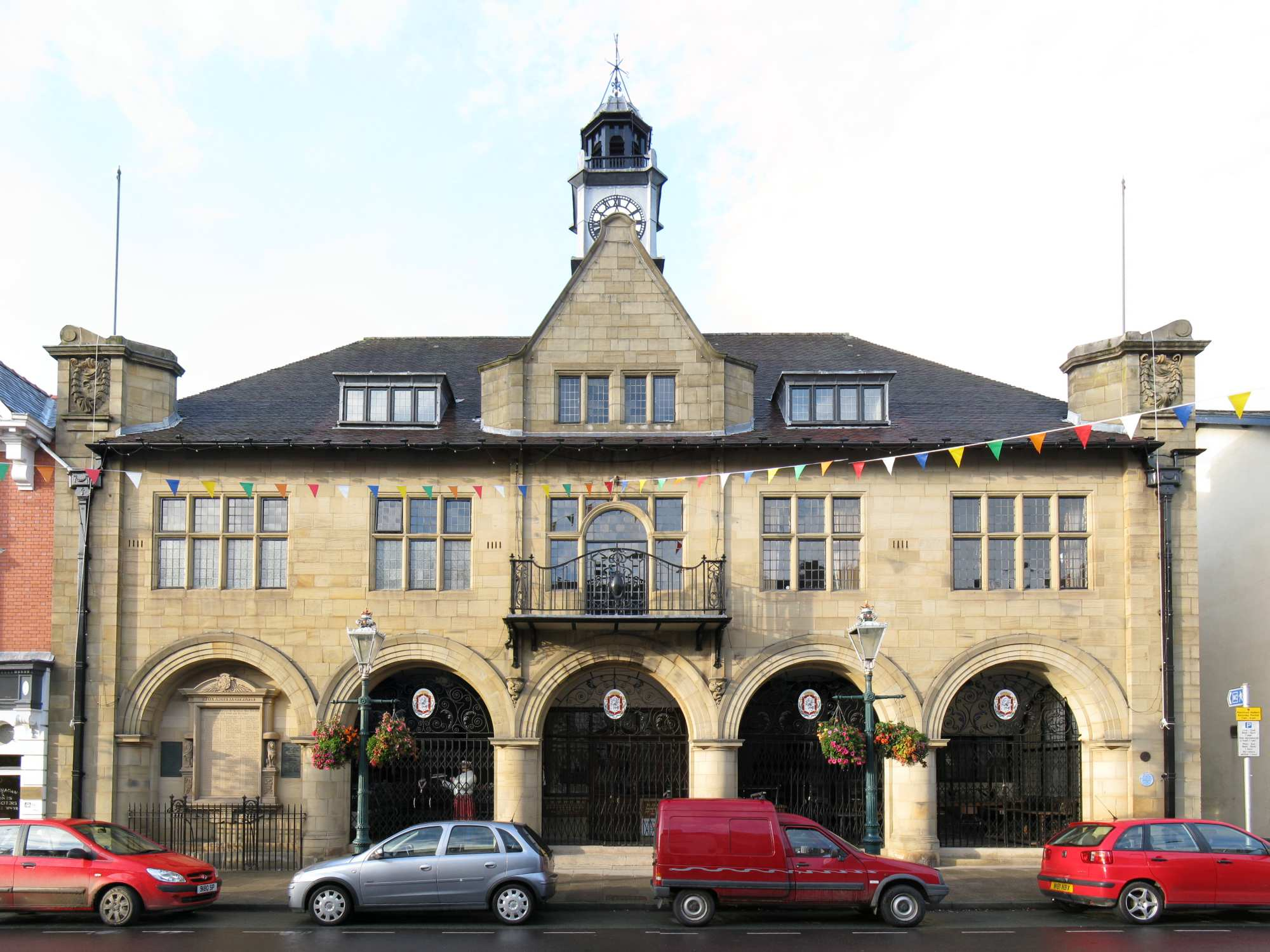
Llanidloes Town Hall

=== Buildings ===
- Old Market Hall stands at the crossroads of the four streets of the original medieval town. Built around 1600, the half-timbered structure is the only surviving building of this type in Wales. Assize courts were held in the hall around 1605, and John Wesley preached from a pulpit stone on the open ground floor in 1748.
- Llanidloes Town Hall, Great Oak st, designed by the architects Shayler and Ridge in 1908. Faced in Cefn stone from Minera. Frank Shayler was a notable Arts and Crafts architect and this is one of the best examples of his work. The Town Hall now contains the Llanidloes Museum.
- Dol-Llys Hall, to the north of the town is a Grade II* listed Regency villa which now operates as a cohousing collective.

=== Bridges ===
- Two masonry arch bridges, the Long Bridge and the Short Bridge, were designed by Thomas Penson. The former is a 3-arch bridge built in 1826 over the confluence of the Rivers Severn and Clywedog and is currently Grade II listed. It replaced a mid 18th-century wooden bridge, also called Long Bridge. Short Bridge is a single arch masonry bridge over the River Severn, dating from 1849.

=== The railway station and the Newtown and Llanidloes Railway ===
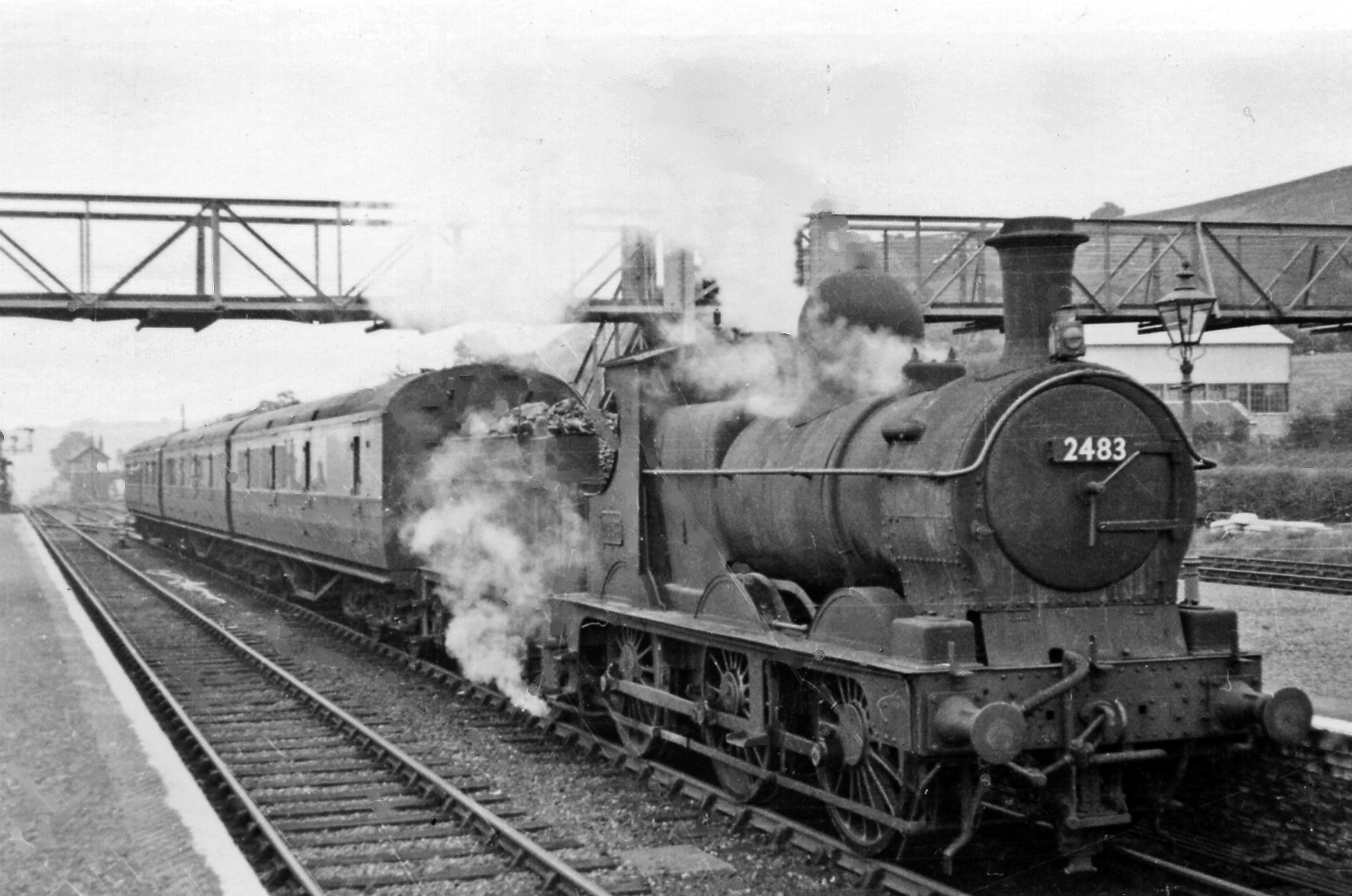
Ex-GWR "Dean Goods" 2301 Class 0-6-0 No.2483 at Llanidloes railway station passenger train going towards Builth Wells and Brecon, 29 August 1949

Llanidloes railway station was opened in 1864 by the Llanidloes and Newtown Railway. Designed as a grand junction station, it was to connect the Mid-Wales Railway and the Manchester and Milford Railway in the south, with Newtown and the Oswestry and Newtown Railway to the north. Designed to hold the railway company's offices, the building is in the Georgian style. The Llanidloes and Newtown railway eventually formed part of the Cambrian Railways, linking it with South Wales. The station closed for passengers on 31 December 1962. The Llanidloes by-pass road runs along a section of the former railway, and the station still stands beside this road. It is now restored and occupied by small businesses.

=== Llanidloes War Memorial Hospital ===
Opened in 1920 as a memorial to local servicemen who died in World War I. In 2006, Powys Local Health Board (LHB) announced that it was planning to make cuts which would result in the downgrading or closure of Llanidloes War Memorial Hospital. The Save Llanidloes Hospital Action Group was formed in response.

== Culture ==
The town became noted for an annual Llanidloes Fancy Dress street party it hosted, which was one of the largest street parties in Wales. The event started in 1969, taking place on the first Friday of July. In 2004 around 5,000 people took part in the festival. The 2005 event was temporarily cancelled due to the costs of safety provisions, but a local councillor provided funding for training of stewards and for public toilets. After concerns linked to costs and public safety the festival was cancelled in 2012.

Llanidloes has a reputation as a very "quirky" town, known for its liberal, counterculture atmosphere. Llanidloes is known as a popular home for ageing hippies.

In 2014, it was rated one of the most attractive postcode areas to live in Wales. It was named one of the best places to live in Wales in 2017.

The headquarters of The Quilt Association is at the Minerva Arts Centre; here they hold workshops and an annual exhibition of quilts.

== Sport ==
Llanidloes Town Football Club was established in 1875. In 2020 they were promoted to Cymru North, in the second tier of the Welsh football league system.

The local rugby union team is Llanidloes RFC.

Llanidloes hosts the WEC GP of Wales, an event in the Enduro World Championship, an off-road motorcycle sport.

== Education ==
Llanidloes High School is a secondary school.

== Transport ==
Buses are run by National Express, Celtic Travel and Williams coaches.

The nearest railway station is Caersws.

== Notable people ==
See Category:People from Llanidloes

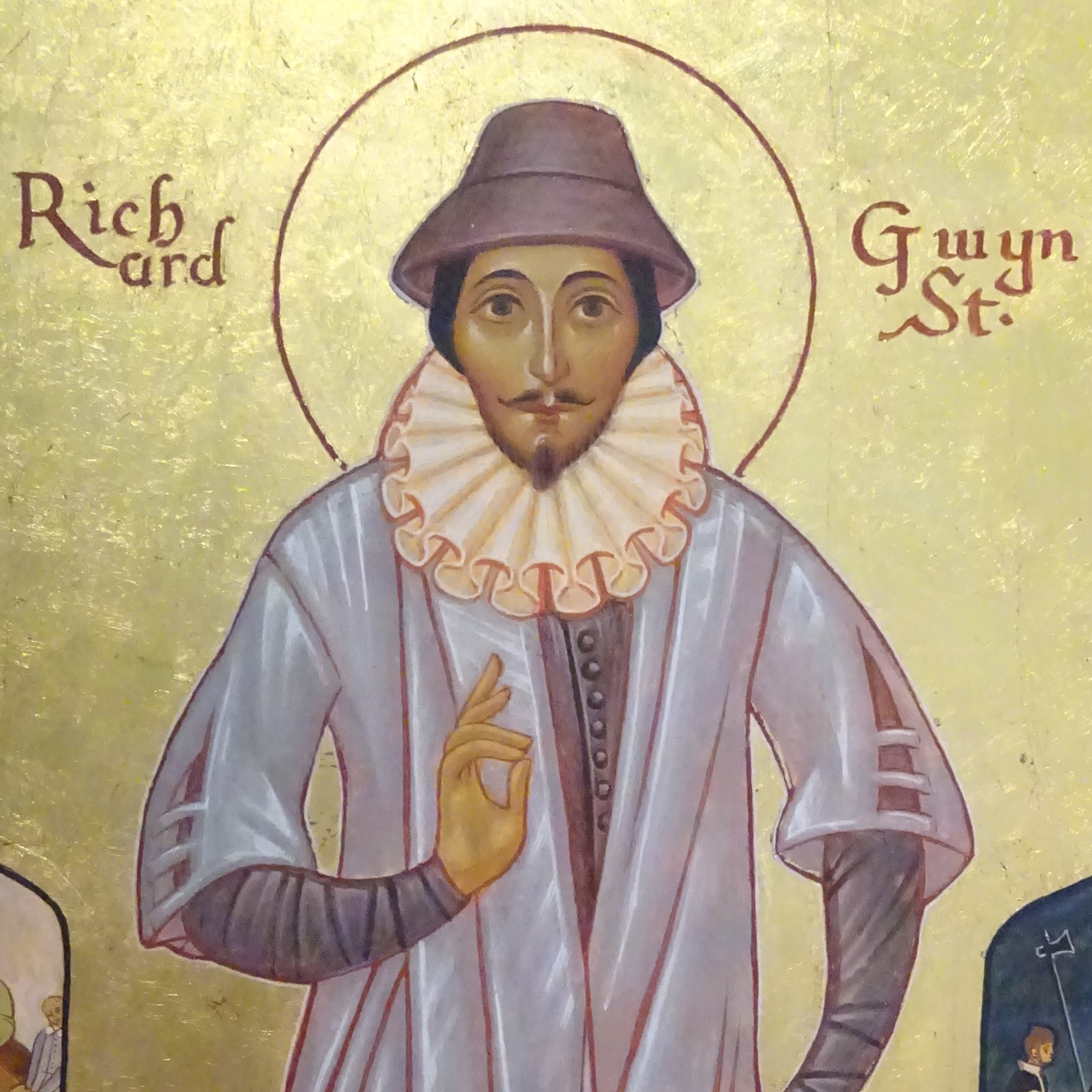
Richard Gwyn

- Richard Gwyn (ca.1537–1584), poet and schoolmaster, canonised in 1970 as one of the Forty Martyrs of England and Wales.
- Abraham Matthews (1832–1899), Congregationalist minister and co-founder of the Welsh settlement in Patagonia.
- John Ceiriog Hughes (1832–1887), romantic poet and stationmaster.
- Elinor Bennett (born 1943), harpist.
- John Bufton (born 1962), politician, former UKIP MEP
- Ali Meredith-Lacey, (born 1991), stage name Novo Amor, multi-instrumentalist, singer, songwriter, sound designer and producer.

=== Sport ===
- Mike Hughes (1940–2018), footballer with 247 club appearances and manager
- Mickey Evans (born 1947), former footballer with 393 appearances for Wrexham A.F.C.
- Kevin Lloyd (born 1970), footballer with over 230 club appearances
- Ross Stephens (born 1985), footballer with over 270 club appearances

== Town twinning ==
Llanidloes is twinned with Derval, Pays de la Loire, France.

== Literature ==
- Horsfall-Turner E.R. (1908) A Municipal History of Llanidloes.
