= List of domesticated animals =

This page gives a list of domesticated animals, also including a list of animals which are or may be currently undergoing the process of domestication and animals that have an extensive relationship with humans beyond simple predation. This includes species which are semi-domesticated, undomesticated but captive-bred on a commercial scale, or commonly wild-caught, at least occasionally captive-bred, and tameable. In order to be considered fully domesticated, most species have undergone significant genetic, behavioural and morphological changes from their wild ancestors, while others have changed very little from their wild ancestors despite hundreds or thousands of years of potential selective breeding. Many factors determine how quickly any changes may occur in a species, but there is not always a desire to improve a species from its wild form. Domestication is a gradual process, so there is no precise moment in the history of a given species when it can be considered to have become fully domesticated.

Zooarchaeology has identified three classes of animal domesticates:

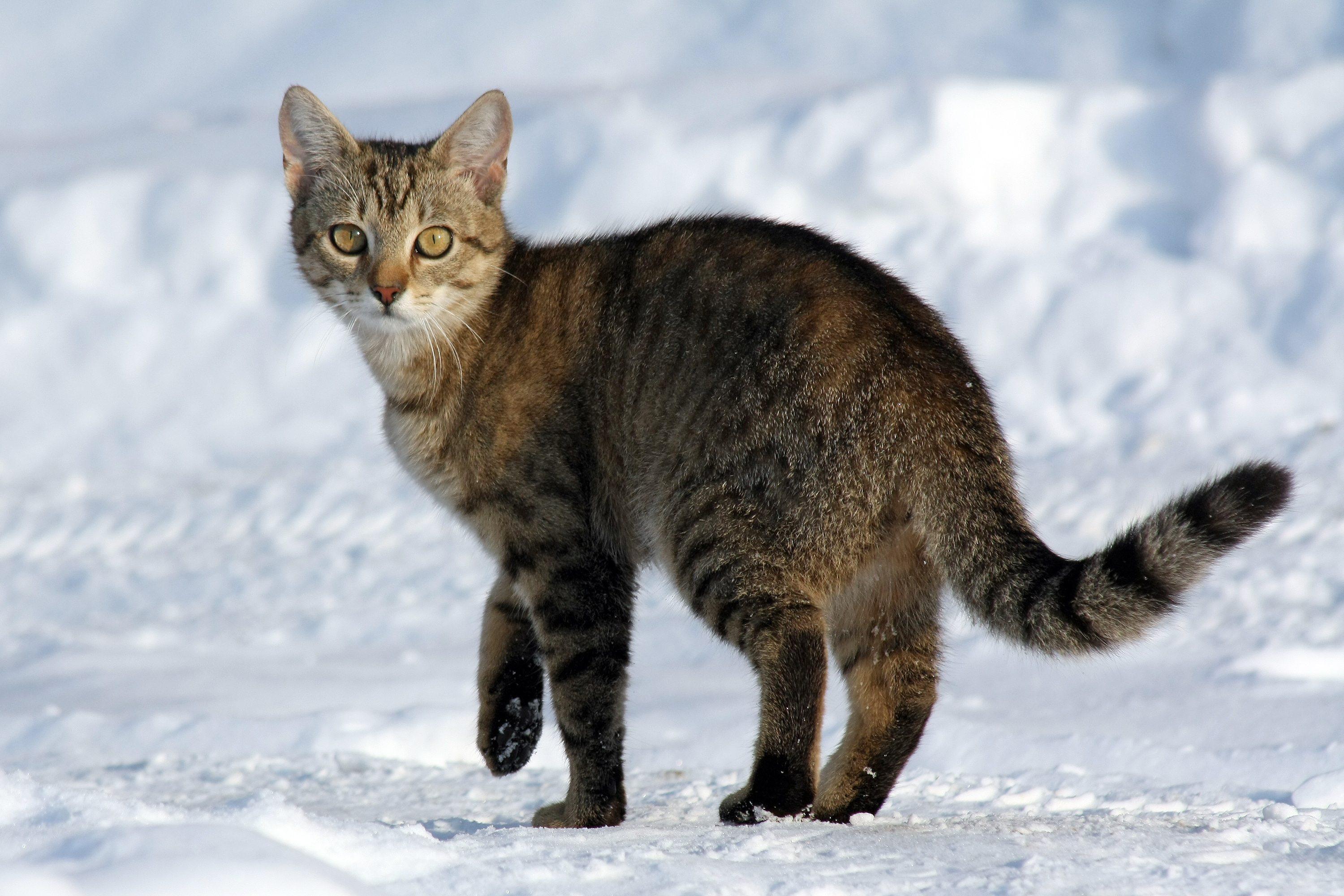
A cat

1. Pets (dogs, cats, ferrets, hamsters, etc.)
2. Livestock (cattle, sheep, pigs, goats, etc.)
3. Working animal (horses, camels, donkeys, etc.)

== Domesticated animals ==
| Species and subspecies | Wild ancestor | Date | Location of origin | Purposes | Image | Changes from wild ancestor/ Notes | Extent in the wild vs. captivity | Taxon group |
|---|---|---|---|---|---|---|---|---|
| Domestic dog (Canis familiaris) | Extinct Pleistocene population of the grey wolf (Canis lupus ssp.) | 13,000 BCE | China, Europe in different places in Asia | meat, leather, fiber, hunting, herding, guarding, fighting, racing, working, rescuing, guiding, policing, draft, pack, sport, service, therapy, narcotics detection, truffle harvesting, pest control, research, education, show, pets | | Tame (with exceptions), significant physical changes, probably significant behavioral changes as well | Domestic and feral dogs both very common, ancestor or nearest wild relative less common, but not rare | 1c Carnivora |
| Domestic sheep (Ovis aries) | Possibly the Armenian mouflon (Ovis gmelini gmelini) | 11 000 BCE to 9000 BCE | Anatolia, Iran | meat, milk, fiber, leather, hides, pelts, horns, vellum, manure, guarding, fighting, racing, lawn mowing, weed control, research, ornamental, show, pets | | Some physical changes | Common in captivity, threatened in the wild | 1b Bovidae |
| Domestic pig (Sus domesticus) | Anatolian boar (Sus scrofa libycus), Northern Chinese boar (Sus scrofa moupinensis) | 9400 BCE | China, Western Asia | meat, leather, tusks, manure, guarding, fighting, racing, truffle harvesting, weed control, research, show, pets | | Some physical changes | Common in the wild, much more common in captivity, feral populations common in some areas | 1a Artiodactyla except Bovidae |
| European cattle or taurine cattle (Bos taurus) | Eurasian aurochs (Bos primigenius primigenius)† | 8500 BCE | China, Western Asia | meat, milk, leather, hides, fiber, horns, vellum, blood, dung, working, plowing, guarding, fighting, racing, draft, mount, soil fertilization, lawn mowing, weed control, worship, show, pets | | Considerable physical changes. Some female breeds featuring larger, pronounced udder | Very common in captivity, wild relatives extinct, feral populations fairly common | 1b Bovidae |
| Domestic goat (Capra hircus) | Bezoar ibex (Capra aegagrus aegagrus) | 8000 BCE | Iran | milk, meat, fiber, skin, horns, vellum, manure, guarding, fighting, racing, lawn mowing, weed control, clearing land, show, pets | | Slight physical changes | Common in captivity, threatened in the wild, feral populations common | 1b Bovidae |
| Zebu, Brahman cattle, indicine cattle or humped cattle (Bos indicus) | Indian aurochs (Bos primigenius namadicus)† | 8000 BCE | Indian subcontinent | meat, milk, leather, hides, horns, vellum, blood, dung, working, plowing, fighting, racing, draft, soil fertilization, lawn mowing, show, pets | | Considerable physical changes | Common in captivity, wild relatives extinct | 1b Bovidae |
| Domestic cat or house cat (Felis catus) | Common North African wildcat (Felis lybica lybica) | 8000–7500 BCE | the Near East | meat, pelts, pest control, research, show, pets | | Tame, slight physical changes | Very abundant in captivity; true wildcat species less abundant, though not rare, feral populations very common | 1c Carnivora |
| Domestic chicken (Gallus gallus domesticus) | Indian red junglefowl (Gallus gallus murghi) with some contribution from the grey junglefowl (Gallus sonneratii) | 6000 BCE1650 to 1250 BCE | India and Southeast Asia/Thailand | meat, eggs, feathers, leather, manure, guarding, alarming, fighting, racing, pest control, weed control, ornamental, show, pets | | Some physical changes, considerable reproductive changes | Extremely common in captivity, common in the wild | 2b Galliformes |
| Guinea pig (Cavia porcellus) | Montane guinea pig (Cavia tschudii) | 5000 BCE | Peru | meat, manure, racing, lawn mowing, weed control, research, show, pets | | Tame, slight physical changes | Somewhat common in the wild and in captivity | 1d Rodentia |
| Domestic donkey, domestic ass or burro (Equus asinus) | African wild ass (Equus africanus), including subspecies Nubian (E. a. africanus) and Somali wild ass (E. a. somaliensis) | 5000 BCE | Nubia | meat, milk, manure, working, plowing, guarding, racing, draft, pack, mount, lawn mowing, weed control, show, pets | | Slight physical changes | Somewhat common in captivity and as feral populations, wild relatives critically endangered | 1e Other mammals |
| Gayal or Mithun (Bos frontalis) | Gaur (Bos gaurus) with significant introgression from other Bos species | 5000 BCE | Southeast Asia, Northeast India | meat, milk, horns, dung | | Slight physical changes | Somewhat common in captivity, threatened in the wild | 1b Bovidae |
| Domestic duck (Anas platyrhynchos domesticus) | Common mallard (Anas platyrhynchos platyrhynchos) | 4000 BCE | China | meat, eggs, feathers, manure, guarding, pest control, weed control, ornamental, show, pets | | Considerable physical changes | Very common in captivity, widespread wild populations | 2a Anseriformes |
| Domestic water buffalo (Bubalus bubalis) | Wild water buffalo (Bubalus arnee) | 4000 BCE | India, Mainland Southeast Asia, Philippines | meat, milk, horns, dung, working, plowing, fighting, racing, draft, mount, lawn mowing, show | | Mainly unchanged from the wild animal | Common in captivity, endangered in the wild, feral populations common in parts of Australia and South America | 1b Bovidae |
| Dromedary or Arabian camel (Camelus dromedarius) | Unknown | 4000 BCE | Arabia, the Horn of Africa | meat, milk, urine, racing, hunting, pack, mount, show, pets | | Tame, few physical changes | Moderately common in captivity, small feral population in original range, significant feral population in Australia, truly wild dromedaries may be extinct | 1a Artiodactyla except Bovidae |
| Western honey bee (Apis mellifera) including subspecies German (A. m. mellifera), Italian (A. m. ligustica), Carniolan (A. m. carnica), Caucasian (A. m. caucasia), Greek (A. m. cecropia), Saharan (A. m. sahariensis) and Egyptian honey bees (A. m. lamarckii) | - | 4000 BCE (the modern era for A. m. mellifera, the 1880s for A. m. ligustica, uncertain for A. m. carnica, A. m. caucasia, A. m. cecropia, A. m. sahariensis and A. m. lamarckii) | Europe (including Germany, Italy, Greece, Slovenia and the United Kingdom), Georgia, North Africa | honey, wax, propolis, bee brood, royal jelly, venom, pollen, pollination, research | | Some physical and behavioral changes, actual domestication status is still a point of contention | Very common in captivity, feral populations common, extent of status in the wild unclear; see Western honey bee for details | 6a Hymenoptera |
| Domestic horse (Equus caballus) | Extinct unknown population of the wild horse (Equus ferus), possibly the tarpan or European wild horse (E. f. ferus)† | 4000-3500 BCE | Ukraine or Kazakhstan | milk, meat, leather, hair, manure, working, plowing, fighting, racing, servicing, guiding, draft, pack, mount, execution, lawn mowing, weed control, show, pets | | Tame, some physical changes, mainly in colouration | Common in captivity, very rare in the wild, feral populations common | 1e Other mammals |
| Bali cattle (Bos javanicus domesticus) | Banteng (Bos javanicus) | 3500 BCE | Bali, Indonesia | meat, milk, horns, dung, working, plowing, draft, show | | Slight physical changes | Common in captivity, endangered in the wild | 1b Bovidae |
| Domestic silkmoth (Bombyx mori) | Wild silkmoth (Bombyx mandarina) | 3000 BCE | China | silk, animal feed, pets | | Tame/held in captivity, some physical changes, flightless | Fairly common in captivity, extent of status in the wild unclear | 6b Lepidoptera |
| Eri silkmoth (Samia ricini) | Ailanthus silkmoth (Samia cynthia) and wild eri silkmoth (Samia canningi) | date uncertain | India | silk, pets | | Tame/held in captivity, some physical changes | Common in captivity | 6b Lepidoptera |
| Domestic pigeon (Columba livia domestica) | Rock dove (Columba livia) | 3000 BCE | the Mediterranean Basin | meat, manure, racing, messenger, ornamental, show, pets | | Artificially selected and bred into many varieties including meat breeds, racing/messenger breeds and fancy plumage breeds | Relatively common in captivity, very common in the wild, feral populations extremely abundant | 2c Columbiformes |
| Domestic goose and domestic swan goose (Anser anser domesticus and A. cygnoides domesticus) | Greylag goose (Anser anser) and swan goose (A. cygnoides) | 3000 BCE for A. anser, date uncertain for A. cygnoides | Egypt (A. anser), China (A. cygnoides) | meat, eggs, feathers, manure, guarding, alarming, pest control, weed control, show, pets | | Considerable physical changes | Common in the wild and in captivity | 2a Anseriformes |
| Domestic yak (Bos grunniens) | Wild yak (Bos mutus) | 2500 BCE | Tibet, Nepal | meat, milk, fiber, horns, dung, working, plowing, guarding, fighting, racing, pack, mount, show, pets | | Tame, slight physical changes | Fairly common in captivity; threatened in the wild | 1b Bovidae |
| Domestic Bactrian camel (Camelus bactrianus) | Wild Bactrian camel (Camelus ferus) | 2500 BCE | Central Asia (Afghanistan) | meat, milk, hair, dung, pack, mount, show, pets | | Tame, few physical changes | Moderately common in captivity, critically endangered in the wild | 1a Artiodactyla except Bovidae |
| Llama (Lama glama) | Guanaco (Lama guanicoe cacsilensis) | 2400 BCE | Peru, Bolivia | meat, fiber, manure, working, guarding, racing, draft, pack, lawn mowing, weed control, show, pets | | Slight physical changes | Fairly common in the wild and in captivity | 1a Artiodactyla except Bovidae |
| Alpaca (Lama pacos) | Vicuña (Lama vicugna mensalis) | 2400 BCE | Peru, Bolivia | meat, milk, fiber, manure, guarding, lawn mowing, weed control, show, pets | | Considerable physical changes | Fairly common in the wild and in captivity | 1a Artiodactyla except Bovidae |
| Domestic guineafowl (Numida meleagris domesticus) | West African helmeted guineafowl (Numida meleagris galeatus) | 2400 BCE | West Africa | meat, eggs, manure, guarding, alarming, pest control, show, pets | | Mainly unaltered from the wild population | Somewhat common in the wild and in captivity | 2b Galliformes |
| Fuegian dog or Yaghan dog† | Culpeo or Andean fox (Lycalopex culpaeus) | date uncertain | Argentina, Chile | hunting, guarding, warmth, pets | | Tame, slight physical changes | Extinct | 1c Carnivora |
| Domestic ferret (Mustela furo) | Common polecat (Mustela putorius putorius) and Mediterranean polecat (M. p. aureola) | 1500 BCE | North Africa, Iberia | hunting, racing, pest control, show, pets | | Tame, slight physical changes | Common in captivity, somewhat common in the wild, feral populations rare | 1c Carnivora |
| Domestic Muscovy duck (Cairina moschata domestica) | Wild Muscovy duck (Cairina moschata sylvestris) | 700–600 BCE | South America | meat, eggs, feathers, manure, guarding, pest control, show, pets | | Tame, some physical changes | Common in captivity, feral populations rare | 2a Anseriformes |
| Barbary dove or ringed turtle dove (Streptopelia risoria) | African collared dove (Streptopelia roseogrisea) | 500 BCE | North Africa | meat, show, pets | | Slight physical changes | Common in both captivity and feral populations | 2c Columbiformes |
| Domestic turkey (Meleagris gallopavo domesticus) | South Mexican wild turkey (Meleagris gallopavo gallopavo) | 180 CE | Mexico | meat, eggs, feathers, manure, guarding, pest control, show, pets | | Considerable physical changes | Common in the wild and in captivity | 2b Galliformes |
| Goldfish (Carassius auratus) | Prussian carp (Carassius gibelio) | 300 CE to 400 CE | China | racing, pest control, ornamental, show, pets | | Tame, significant physical changes | Very common and abundant in captivity, extent of status in the wild unclear | 5a Cyprinidae |
| Domestic rabbit (Oryctolagus cuniculus domesticus) | Iberian rabbit (Oryctolagus cuniculus algirus) | 600 CE | Europe | meat, fiber, pelts, manure, racing, lawn mowing, weed control, research, show, pets | | Tame, significant physical changes | Common in captivity, rare in native habitat, common in introduced range | 1e Other mammals |
| Koi (Cyprinus rubrofuscus) | Amur carp (Cyprinus rubrofuscus) | the 11th century CE | Japan | ornamental, show, pets | | Tame, considerable physical changes | Fairly common in captivity, threatened in the wild | 5a Cyprinidae |
| Japanese quail (Coturnix japonica) or Domesticated quail | Japanese quail (Coturnix japonica) | the 11~12th century CE | Japan | meat, eggs, research, pets | | considerable physical changes | Common in the wild and in captivity | 2b Galliformes |
| Domestic canary (Serinus canaria domestica) | Wild canary (Serinus canaria canaria) | the 15th century CE | the Canary Islands, Europe | coal mining, fighting, research, show, pets | | Slight physical changes | Common in the wild and in captivity | 2d Passeriformes |
| Society finch or Bengalese finch (Lonchura striata domestica) | White-rumped munia or striated finch (Lonchura striata swinhoei) with some contribution from the Indian silverbill or white-throated munia (Euodice malabarica) | unknown, may have been introduced to Japan sometime around the early 18th century CE | Japan | pets, show, research | | Slight physical changes | Fairly common in captivity; both parent species common in the wild | 2d Passeriformes |
| Fancy mouse or laboratory mouse (Mus musculus domestica) | Western European house mouse (Mus musculus domesticus), Japanese house mouse (Mus musculus molossinus) | 1100 BCE (China), then the 17th century CE (Europe), the 18th Century (Japan) | China, Europe, Japan | animal feed, racing, research, show, pets | | Tame, significant physical changes | Common in the wild and in captivity | 1d Rodentia |
| Fancy rat or laboratory rat (Rattus norvegicus domestica) | Brown rat (Rattus norvegicus) | the 19th century CE | the United Kingdom | animal feed, research, show, pets | | Tame, some physical and psychological changes | Common in the wild and in captivity | 1d Rodentia |
| Domestic mink (Neogale vison domesticus) | Eastern mink (Neogale vison vison), Kenai mink (N. v. melampeplus) and Alaskan mink (N. v. ingens) | Early 1860s | Cassadaga Lakes, New York | fur, hunting, pest control, pets | | Some physical and psychological changes | Somewhat common in the wild and in captivity | 1c Carnivora |
| Domesticated silver fox (Vulpes vulpes) | Red fox (Vulpes vulpes) | late 19th century to 20th century CE | Prince Edward Island/Soviet Union (Russia) | fur, pelts, research, pets | | Tame, some physical changes | Very small domestic population, wild relatives fairly common | 1c Carnivora |

== Tame, partially domesticated, and widely captive-bred animals ==
Due to the somewhat unclear outlines of what precisely constitutes domestication, there are some species that may or may not be fully domesticated. There are also some species that are extensively commercially used by humans, but are not significantly altered from wild-type animals. Many animals on this second table are at least somewhat altered from wild-type animals due to their extensive interactions with humans, albeit not to the point that they are regarded as distinct forms (therefore, no separate wild ancestors are noted) or would be unable to survive if reintroduced to the wild.

| Species and subspecies | Date | Location of origin | Purpose | Image | Changes from wild ancestor/ Notes | Extent in the wild vs. captivity | Taxon group |
|---|---|---|---|---|---|---|---|
| Asian elephant (Elephas maximus) including subspecies Sri Lankan (E. m. maximus), Indian (E. m. indicus), Sumatran (E. m. sumatranus), Bornean (E. m. borneensis) and formerly Syrian elephants (E. m. asurus)† | 2000 BCE (uncertain for E. m. maximus, E. m. sumatranus, E. m. borneensis and E. m. asurus)† | India, Sri Lanka, Sumatra, Nepal, Borneo, China, Indochina, formerly Iran | dung, working, hunting, fighting, racing, transportation, mount, patrol, worship, show | | Individuals taken from the wild and tamed on a wide scale | Syrian subspecies extinct in the wild and in captivity; other subspecies somewhat common in captivity, but endangered in the wild | 1e Other mammals |
| Domestic reindeer (Rangifer tarandus domesticus) | 3000 BCE | Fennoscandia, Western Russia (possibly Eastern Russia), China, Mongolia | meat, milk, leather, hides, antlers, transportation, mount, pets | | | | 1a Artiodactyla except Bovidae |
| Common (Struthio camelus) and Somali ostriches (S. molybdophanes) | date uncertain | Africa, Mesopotamia | meat, eggs, feathers, sacrifices | | | | 2f Palaeognathae |
| Scimitar-horned oryx (Oryx dammah) | 2320–2150 BCE | Egypt | meat, hides, horns, sacrifices | | | Small captive population, but nearly extinct in the wild | 1b Bovidae |
| Four-toed (Atelerix albiventris), Algerian (A. algirus), long-eared (Hemiechinus auritus) and Indian long-eared hedgehog (H. collaris) | the 1980s | Central and Eastern Africa | pets | | Slight physical changes | Common in the wild, somewhat rare in captivity | 1e Other mammals |
| Caracal (Caracal caracal) | date uncertain, possibly 200 BCE | Egypt, India, Southern Africa | hunting, pest control, pets | | | | 1c Carnivora |
| Cheetah (Acinonyx jubatus) including subspecies Southeast African (A. j. jubatus), Northeast African (A. j. soemmeringii) and Asiatic cheetahs (A. j. venaticus) | 1500 BCE | Egypt, India, the Middle East, South Africa | hunting, tourism, pets | | | | 1c Carnivora |
| Bubal hartebeest (Alcelaphus buselaphus buselaphus)† | date uncertain | Egypt | meat, hides, horns, sacrifices | | Historically farmed | Extinct in the wild and in captivity | 1b Bovidae |
| Mandarin duck (Aix galericulata) | pre-modern China (date uncertain) | China | pest control, ornamental, pets | | | | 2a Anseriformes |
| Egyptian goose (Alopochen aegyptiacus) | date uncertain | Egypt | meat, eggs, feathers, guarding, ornamental, pets | | | Common in the wild and in captivity, feral populations very common | 2a Anseriformes |
| Leopard cat (Prionailurus bengalensis) | 5000 BCE | China | pest control, pets | | | Common in the wild, rare in captivity because domestication failed, though hybrid breed Bengal cat is common in captivity. | 1c Carnivora |
| Common genet (Genetta genetta) | date uncertain | Africa | pest control, pets | | | | 1c Carnivora |
| Eastern honey bee (Apis cerana) including subspecies Chinese (A. c. cerana), Indian (A. c. indica) and Japanese honey bees (A. c. japonica) | date uncertain | South Asia, Thailand, Japan, China | honey, wax, pollination | | | | 6a Hymenoptera |
| European fallow (Dama dama) and Persian fallow deer (D. mesopotamica) | 1000 BCE | the Mediterranean Basin, the Levant | meat, hides, antlers, pets | | | | 1a Artiodactyla except Bovidae |
| European medicinal leech (Hirudo medicinalis) | 800 BCE | Europe, Asia | bloodletting, surgery, therapy, research, saliva, pets | | Captive-bred | | 7b Annelida |
| Cochineal (Dactylopius coccus) | 700–500 BCE | Chile, Peru, Mexico | dye | | | Very common in the wild | 6d Other insects |
| Indian (Pavo cristatus) and green peafowl (P. muticus) | 500 BCE (uncertain for P. muticus) | India, Java | meat, feathers, ornamental, guarding, pest control, pets | | | Fairly common in the wild | 2b Galliformes |
| Common hill myna (Gracula religiosa) | kept in ancient Greece, date of captive breeding uncertain | Greece | pets, talking bird | | | | 2d Passeriformes |
| Rose-ringed parakeet (Psittacula krameri) including subspecies African (P. k. krameri) and Indian rose-ringed parakeets (P. k. manillensis); Alexandrine Parakeets (P. eupatria) | classical antiquity (date uncertain) | West Africa, India | pets, talking bird | | Captive-bred, plumage colour changes | | 2e Psittaciformes |
| Red deer (Cervus elaphus) including subspecies Caspian (C. e. maral), Norwegian (C. e. atlanticus) and Scottish red deer (C. e. scoticus) | ~1 CE | China, Russia, Europe (including the United Kingdom), Iran | meat, milk, leather, hides, antlers, velvet, pets | | Captive-bred | | 1a Artiodactyla except Bovidae |
| Roman snail (Helix pomatia) | 100 CE | Europe | meat, eggs, shells, slime, pets | | Captive-bred | | 7a Mollusca |
| Stingless bees (Melipona beecheii), (M. scutellaris), (M. bicolor), (M. quadrifasciata) and (M. subnitida) | 180 CE | Mexico, the Amazon Basin | honey, wax, propolis, pollination, pets | | | | 6a Hymenoptera |
| White (Cacatua alba), sulphur-crested (C. galerita), Salmon-crested (C. moluccensis), blue-eyed (C. ophthalmica), and Red-vented cockatoos (C. haematuropygia); long-billed (C. tenuirostris), western (C. pastinator), little (C. sanguinea) and Tanimbar corellas (C. goffiniana) | the Tang dynasty (618–907 CE) (C. alba) | China, Australia, Indonesia, New Guinea | pets, show | | Captive-bred | | 2e Psittaciformes |
| Great (Phalacrocorax carbo) and Japanese cormorants (P. capillatus) | 960 CE | China, Japan | fishing | | | | 2h Other birds |
| Mute swan (Cygnus olor) | 1000-1500 CE | Europe (including the United Kingdom) | meat, feathers, ornamental, guarding, pets | | | | 2a Anseriformes |
| House cricket (Acheta domesticus) | the 12th century CE | Southwestern Asia, China, Japan | meat, animal feed, fighting, pets | | | Somewhat common in captivity, very common in the wild | 6d Other insects |
| Common quail (Coturnix coturnix) | 1100–1900 CE | Eurasia | meat, eggs, research, pets | | | | 2b Galliformes |
| Common carp (Cyprinus carpio) | 1200–1500 CE | Europe, Asia | meat, eggs, pets | | | | 5a Cyprinidae |
| Java sparrow (Lonchura oryzivora) | the Ming dynasty (1368–1644 CE) | China | pets | | Non-wild coloration pied and fancy colored Java sparrows from long Asian captivity lines are hand tamable | Threatened in the wild | 2d Passeriformes |
| Siamese fighting fish or betta (Betta splendens); Spotted betta (B. picta) | the 19th century CE (uncertain for B. picta) | Thailand, Malaysia, Borneo | fighting, show, pets | | Very significant physical and slight behavioral changes | Common in captivity | 5c Anabantiformes |
| Northern bobwhite (Colinus virginianus) including subspecies masked bobwhite (C. v. ridgwayi) | date uncertain | the United States, Sonora | meat, eggs, feathers, pets | | Captive-bred, plumage changes | | 2b Galliformes |
| European goldfinch (Carduelis carduelis) | date uncertain | Europe | pets, singing | | Captive-bred | | 2d Passeriformes |
| Indian grey mongoose (Urva edwardsii) | date uncertain | India | pest control, fighting, pets | | | | 1c Carnivora |
| Golden (Chrysolophus pictus) and Lady Amherst's pheasants (C. amherstiae) | date uncertain | China | ornamental, pest control, pets | | | | 2b Galliformes |
| Cassowary (Casuarius spp.), especially Casuarius casuarius | date uncertain | Papua New Guinea | meat, feathers, bones, toenails, ritual, status symbol | | Not fully domesticated; longstanding village-based rearing, traditionally wild-caught chicks reared by hand | Still relatively abundant in the wild but declining; captive rearing occurs in some highland villages | 2f Palaeognathae |
| Common (Phasianus colchicus) and green pheasants (P. versicolor) | date uncertain | Asia, Japan | meat, eggs, ornamental, pest control, pets | | | | 2b Galliformes |
| Sika deer (Cervus nippon) | date uncertain | China, Taiwan, Japan | meat, hides, antlers, tourism, pets | | | | 1a Artiodactyla except Bovidae |
| Common (Taurotragus oryx) and Giant eland (T. derbianus) | date uncertain | Zimbabwe, South Africa, Kenya | meat, milk, leather, hides, horns | | | | 1b Bovidae |
| American alligator (Alligator mississippiensis) | date uncertain | the southeastern United States | meat, hides, teeth, blood, pets | | Captive-bred | Once uncommon in the wild; captive breeding has led to the species both recovering across and repopulating much of its range. | 3d Other reptiles |
| Eurasian elk or moose (Alces alces) including subspecies Alaskan moose (A. a. gigas) | date uncertain | Russia, Finland, Sweden, Alaska | meat, milk, hides, antlers, working, draft, mount, transportation, research, pets | | | | 1a Artiodactyla except Bovidae |
| Budgerigar (Melopsittacus undulatus) | the 1850s | Australia | pets, show, talking bird | | Captive-bred, plumage colour/pattern changes, some breeds are physically larger | Fairly common in the wild and in captivity | 2e Psittaciformes |
| Cockatiel (Nymphicus hollandicus) | the 1870s | Australia | pets, show, talking bird | | Captive-bred, plumage colour/pattern changes | Common in the wild and in captivity | 2e Psittaciformes |
| Elk or wapiti (Cervus canadensis) | date uncertain | North America, Russia, China | meat, leather, hides, antlers, velvet, pets | | Captive-bred | | 1a Artiodactyla except Bovidae |
| European mink (Mustela lutreola) | the 1800s | Europe, Russia | fur | | | | 1c Carnivora |
| Coypu or nutria (Myocastor coypus) | the late 19th to the early 20th century CE | Argentina | meat, fur, aquatic weed control, pets | | Captive-bred | | 1d Rodentia |
| Guppy (Poecilia reticulata); Cauca (P. caucana), sailfin (P. latipinna), shortfin (P. mexicana), liberty (P. salvatoris), common (P. sphenops), and Yucatán mollies (P. velifera); Endler's livebearer (P. wingei) | date uncertain | Barbados, Brazil, El Salvador, Guyana, Mexico, Venezuela | bait, pest control, research, pets | | | | 5e Other fish |
| Lesser fruit fly, vinegar fly or pomace fly (Drosophila melanogaster) | the 1910s | Australia, South Africa | research, animal feed | | Captive-bred, some varieties flightless | | 6d Other insects |
| Chinese hamster (Cricetulus griseus) | the 1920s | China | research, biotechnology, pets | | | | 1d Rodentia |
| Rosy-faced (Agapornis roseicollis), yellow-collared (A. personatus), and Fischer's lovebirds (A. fischeri) | the 1920s (uncertain for A. personatus, A. fischeri) | Africa, Madagascar | pets | | Captive-bred, plumage colour/pattern changes in rosy-faced lovebird | | 2e Psittaciformes |
| Rainbowfishes (Melanotaeniidae; various species and subspecies) | the 1920s | northern and eastern Australia, New Guinea, islands in Cenderawasih Bay and the Raja Ampat Islands in Indonesia | pest control, pets | | | | 5e Other fish |
| Golden hamster (Mesocricetus auratus) | the 1930s | Syria, Turkey | pets, research | | | | 1d Rodentia |
| Turkish hamster (Mesocricetus brandti) | the 20th century CE | Armenia, Azerbaijan, Georgia, Iran, Russia, Turkey | pets, research | | | | 1d Rodentia |
| Long-tailed chinchilla (Chinchilla lanigera) | the 1930s | the Andes | fur, research, pets | | | | 1d Rodentia |
| Short-tailed chinchilla (Chinchilla chinchilla) | the 1930s | the Andes | fur | | Raised in captivity | Critically endangered in the wild | 1d Rodentia |
| Water flea (Daphnia magna) | the 1930s | North America, Eurasia, Africa | research, animal feed | | | | 6e Other arthropods |
| African (Xenopus laevis) and western clawed frogs (X. tropicalis) | the 1950s (uncertain for X. tropicalis) | Southern Africa, West Africa | research, pets | | Captive-bred | | 4a Anura |
| Sea-monkey (Artemia nyos) | the 1950s | the United States | pets, research | | Captive-bred | | 6e Other arthropods |
| Ball (Python regius), Borneo (P. breitensteini), Sumatran short-tailed (P. curtus) and Brongersma's short-tailed pythons (P. brongersmai) | the 1960s (uncertain for P. breitensteini, P. curtus and P. brongersmai) | Africa, Sumatra, Borneo, Malaysia | pets | | Captive-bred | | 3a Serpentes |
| Burmese python (Python bivittatus) including subspecies dwarf Burmese python (P. b. progschai) | date uncertain | Myanmar, Thailand, Bali, Java, Sulawesi | meat, skins, medicine, pets | | Captive-bred | | 3a Serpentes |
| Campbell's (Phodopus campbelli), winter white (P. sungorus) and Roborovski dwarf hamsters (P. roborovskii) | the 1960s | Mongolia, Russia, China | pets, research | | | | 1d Rodentia |
| Axolotl (Ambystoma mexicanum); tiger (A. tigrinum) and barred tiger salamanders (A. mavortium) | the 20th century CE (uncertain for A. tigrinum and A. mavortium) | Mexico, the United States | research, pets | | Slight physical changes | A. mexicanum Critically endangered in the wild; A. tigrinum and A. mavortium less threatened | 4b Other amphibians |
| Common leopard gecko (Eublepharis macularius) | the 20th century CE (uncertain for E. m. afghanicus) | Pakistan, Afghanistan | pets | | Slight physical changes | Somewhat common in captivity | 3b Lacertilia |
| American bison (Bison bison) including subspecies wood bison (B. b. athabascae) | the 20th century CE (uncertain for B. b. athabascae) | North America | meat, leather, hides, fiber, horns, guarding, pets | | | Over 90% of bison are in privately-owned commercial herds | 1b Bovidae |
| Companion parrots (Psittaciformes; various species and subspecies) | the 1980s and 1990s | Australia, Africa, Asia, North America, Central America, South America, New Zealand, Papua New Guinea, New Caledonia, Fiji | pets, show, talking bird, ornamental, guarding, education, therapy | | Captive-bred, plumage colour changes in some species (e.g. grey parrot, turquoise-fronted amazon, green-cheeked parakeet and others) | | 2e Psittaciformes |
| Poison dart frogs (Dendrobatidae spp.) | the mid- to late 20th century CE | Guyana, Suriname, Brazil, French Guiana, Nicaragua, Costa Rica, Panama, Colombia, Venezuela | pets | | Slight physical changes; loss of toxicity | | 4a Anura |
| Common (Lampropeltis getula), grey-banded (L. alterna), and Thayer's kingsnakes (L. mexicana thayeri); Milk snake (L. triangulum) | date uncertain | Arizona, Florida, Mexico, California | pets | | | | 3a Serpentes |
| Corn (Pantherophis guttatus) and western rat snakes (P. obsoletus) | the 1960s (uncertain for P. obsoletus) | the United States | pets | | Slight physical changes | Somewhat common in captivity, common in the wild | 3a Serpentes |
| Madagascar (Gromphadorhina portentosa) and wide-horned hissing cockroaches (G. oblongonota) | the 1960s (uncertain for G. oblongonota) | Madagascar | pets | | Captive-bred | | 6c Blattodea |
| Central bearded dragon (Pogona vitticeps) and related species | the 1970s | Australia | pets | | Slight physical changes | | 3b Lacertilia |
| Silver carp (Hypophthalmichthys molitrix) | the 1970s | China | meat, algae control | | | | 5a Cyprinidae |
| Sugar glider (Petaurus breviceps) | the 1980s | Australia | pest control, pets | | Captive bred. Non-wild color variations | | 1e Other mammals |
| Buff-tailed (Bombus terrestris) and common eastern bumblebees (B. impatiens) | the 1980s (uncertain for B. impatiens) | Europe (including the United Kingdom), North America | wax, pollination | | | | 6a Hymenoptera |
| Gambian (Cricetomys gambianus) and Emin's pouched rats (C. emini) | at least 1997, but possibly the early 1990s (uncertain for C. emini) | Sub-Saharan Africa | meat, landmine detection, tuberculosis detection, pest control, pets | | | | 1d Rodentia |
| Greater or Ñandú (Rhea americana) and Darwin's rheas (R. pennata) | the 1990s (uncertain for R. pennata) | South America | meat, eggs, feathers, leather, oil, pets | | | | 2f Palaeognathae |
| Australian emu (Dromaius novaehollandiae novaehollandiae) | the 1990s | Australia | meat, eggs, feathers, leather, oil, guarding, pets | | | | 2f Palaeognathae |
| Fringe-eared oryx (Oryx beisa callotis) | date uncertain | Kenya | meat, leather, hides, horns | | | | 1b Bovidae |
| Common degu (Octodon degus) | the 1990s | the Chilean Andes | pets, research | | | | 1d Rodentia |
| Mongolian gerbil (Meriones unguiculatus); Persian (M. persicus), Libyan (M. libycus), Shaw's (M. shawi), Tristram's (M. tristrami) and Sundevall's jirds (M. crassus) | the 1990s (uncertain for M. persicus, M. libycus, M. shawi, M. tristrami and M. crassus) | Mongolia, Algeria, Iran, Libya, Turkey, Egypt | pets, research | | | | 1d Rodentia |
| Green (Iguana iguana) and Lesser Antillean iguanas (I. delicatissima) | the 1990s (uncertain for I. delicatissima) | South America, the Lesser Antilles | meat, leather, pets | | Captive-bred | | 3b Lacertilia |
| Carpet python (Morelia spilota) including subspecies diamond python (M. s. spilota); eastern (M. s. mcdowelli), Murray Darling (M. s. metcalfei), Torresian (M. s. variegata) and jungle carpet pythons (M. s. cheynei) | date uncertain | Indonesia, Australia, New Guinea | pets | | Captive-bred | | 3a Serpentes |
| Southern green tree (Morelia viridis), southwestern carpet (M. imbricata), rough-scaled (M. carinata) and Bredl's pythons (M. bredli) | the mid-1990s (uncertain for M. carinata and M. bredli) | Indonesia, Australia, New Guinea | pets | | Captive-bred | | 3a Serpentes |
| Red-tailed (Calyptorhynchus banksii), yellow-tailed (C. funereus) and glossy black cockatoos (C. lathami) | the late 1990s (uncertain for C. funereus and C. lathami) | Australia | pets, education | | Captive-bred | | 2e Psittaciformes |
| Gouldian finch (Chloebia gouldiae) | the late 1990s | Australia | pets, show | | | | 2d Passeriformes |
| Australian green (Ranoidea caerulea), orange-eyed (R. chloris), leaf green (R. phyllochroa), mountain stream (R. barringtonensis), magnificent (R. splendida), Blue Mountains (R. citropa) and dainty green tree frogs (R. gracilenta); growling grass frog (R. raniformis) | the late 20th century CE (uncertain for R. chloris, R. phyllochroa, R. barringtonensis, R. splendida, R. citropa, R. gracilenta and R. raniformis) | Australia | research, pets | | Captive-bred | | 4a Anura |
| Argentine (Ceratophrys ornata), Brazilian (C. aurita), Venezuelan (C. calcarata), Surinam (C. cornuta), Caatinga (C. joazeirensis), Pacific (C. stolzmanni) and Cranwell's horned frogs (C. cranwelli) | the late 20th century CE (uncertain for C. aurita, C. calcarata, C. cornuta, C. joazeirensis, C. stolzmanni and C. cranwelli) | Argentina, Brazil, Venezuela, Suriname, Ecuador | pets | | Captive-bred | | 4a Anura |
| Crucian (Carassius carassius), Japanese white crucian (C. cuvieri) and Prussian carp (C. gibelio); ginbuna (C. langdorfii) | the 2000s (uncertain for C. cuvieri, C. gibelio and C. langdorfii) | England, Russia, Japan | meat, research, pets | | | | 5a Cyprinidae |
| King quail (Synoicus chinensis) | date uncertain | Asia, Australia | pets | | | | 2b Galliformes |
| Common (Corvus corax), white-necked (C. albicollis) and Australian ravens (C. coronoides); carrion (C. corone), hooded (C. cornix), American (C. brachyrhynchos), pied (C. albus) and house crows (C. splendens); rook (C. frugilegus) | date uncertain | Europe, Africa, India, Australia, North America | pest control, research, show, pets | | | | 2d Passeriformes |
| Oriental darter (Anhinga melanogaster) | date uncertain | India | fishing | | | | 2h Other birds |
| Southern (Chauna torquata) and northern screamers (C. chavaria) | date uncertain | South America | guarding | | | | 2a Anseriformes |
| Horned screamer (Anhima cornuta) | date uncertain | South America | guarding | | | | 2a Anseriformes |
| Red-legged seriema (Cariama cristata) | date uncertain | South America | guarding | | | | 2h Other birds |
| Golden (Aquila chrysaetos),eastern imperial (A. heliaca), Spanish imperial (A. adalberti), wedge-tailed (A. audax), steppe (A. nipalensis), tawny (A. rapax), Bonelli's (A. fasciata) and Verreaux's eagles (A. verreauxii); African hawk-eagle (A. spilogaster) | date uncertain | Europe, North America, Kazakhstan, Mongolia, Africa, Australia | falconry, intercepting, pest control, show, pets | | | | 2g Accipitridae |
| Bald (Haliaeetus leucocephalus) and white-tailed eagles (H. albicilla); African fish eagle (H. vocifer); white-bellied sea (H. leucogaster) and Steller's sea eagles (H. pelagicus) | date uncertain | North America, Europe, Russia, Africa, Australia | falconry, intercepting, pest control, show, pets | | | | 2g Accipitridae |
| Harris's hawk (Parabuteo unicinctus harrisi) | date uncertain | the United States | falconry, pest control, show, pets | | | | 2g Accipitridae |
| Eurasian (Astur gentilis), American (As. atricapillus), crested (Lophospiza trivirgata) and African goshawks (Aerospiza tachiro); Cooper's (As. cooperii) and sharp-shinned hawks (Accipiter striatus); Eurasian (Ac. nisus), Ovambo (Ac. ovampensis), collared (T. cirrocephala), Japanese (T. gularis) and black sparrowhawks (As. melanoleucus); besra (T. virgata); shikra (T. badia); (all previously placed in the Accipiter genus) | date uncertain | Europe, Asia, Africa, North America | falconry, pest control, show, pets | | | | 2g Accipitridae |
| Gyrfalcon (Falco rusticolus), Kestrel (F. sparverius), Peregrine (F. peregrinus), Saker (F. cherrug) and other falcons | 2000 BC | Mesopotamia | falconry, pest control | | Captive-bred and tamed wild-caught, sometimes hybridized | | 2h Other birds |
| Eurasian eagle-owl (Bubo bubo) including subspecies Western Siberian (B. b. sibiricus), Eastern Siberian (B. b. yenisseensis) and Turkmenian eagle-owls (B. b. omissus) | date uncertain | Europe, Russia, Turkmenistan | pest control, show, pets | | | | 2h Other birds |
| Tawny owl (Strix aluco) | date uncertain | Europe (including the United Kingdom) | pest control, show, pets | | | | 2h Other birds |
| Puna ibis (Plegadis ridgwayi) | date uncertain | Peru | meat, eggs, pest control | | | | 2h Other birds |
| Celebes warty pig (Sus celebensis) | date uncertain | Sulawesi | meat, tusks, pets | | Historically farmed | | 1a Artiodactyla except Bovidae |
| Red-necked wallaby (Notamacropus rufogriseus), | the 2000s | Tasmania, South Australia, Western Australia, New South Wales | lawn mowing, research, tourism, pets | | | | 1e Other mammals |
| Red kangaroo (Osphranter rufus) | date uncertain | Australia | meat, leather, tourism, pets | | | | 1e Other mammals |
| Tiger (Dasyurus maculatus), eastern (D. viverrinus), western (D. geoffroii) and northern quolls (D. hallucatus) | date uncertain | Australia | pest control, pets | | | | 1e Other mammals |
| Smooth-coated otter (Lutrogale perspicillata) | date uncertain | Bangladesh | fishing, pets | | | | 1c Carnivora |
| Beech marten (Martes foina) and sable (M. zibellina) | date uncertain | Europe, Russia, India | fur, pest control, pets | | | | 1c Carnivora |
| Fisher or Pennant's marten (Pekania pennanti) | date uncertain | North America | fur, pest control, research, pets | | | | 1c Carnivora |
| Least (Mustela nivalis), Siberian (M. sibirica) and yellow-bellied weasels (M. kathiah); European polecat (M. putorius) | date uncertain | Europe, Russia, India | pest control, pets | | | | 1c Carnivora |
| Lesser grison (Galictis cuja) | date uncertain | South America | hunting, pest control, pets | | | | 1c Carnivora |
| Patagonian weasel (Lyncodon patagonicus) | date uncertain | Argentina, Chile | pest control, pets | | | | 1c Carnivora |
| Common raccoon (Procyon lotor) | date uncertain | North America | pest control, show, pets | | | | 1c Carnivora |
| Ringtail (Bassariscus astutus) | date uncertain | North America, Central America | pest control, pets | | | | 1c Carnivora |
| Mountain paca (Cuniculus taczanowskii) | date uncertain | Mexico, Argentina, Ecuador | meat, pets | | | | 1d Rodentia |
| Malayan (Hystrix brachyura),Sunda (H. javanica), Indian crested (H. indica), African crested (H. cristata), Cape (H. africaeaustralis) and Philippine porcupines (H. pumila) | date uncertain | Vietnam, China, Indonesia, the Philippines, India, Africa | meat, quills, pets | | | | 1d Rodentia |
| Steppe lemming (Lagurus lagurus) | date uncertain | the Eurasian steppe | pets | | | | 1d Rodentia |
| Lesser Egyptian (Gerbillus gerbillus), greater Egyptian (G. pyramidum), pale (G. perpallidus) and pleasant gerbils (G. amoenus) | date uncertain | Egypt, Libya | pets | | | | 1d Rodentia |
| Eurasian harvest mouse (Micromys minutus) | date uncertain | Europe | pest control, pets | | | | 1d Rodentia |
| Chinese cobra (Naja atra) | date uncertain | China | venom, skins, pets | | Captive-bred | | 3a Serpentes |
| Crimson rosella (Platycercus elegans) including subspecies Adelaide (P. e. adelaidae) and yellow rosellas (P. e. flaveolus) | date uncertain | Australia | pets | | Captive-bred | | 2e Psittaciformes |
| Western (Platycercus icterotis), green (P. caledonicus), pale-headed (P. adscitus) and northern rosellas (P. venustus) | date uncertain | Australia | pets | | Captive-bred | | 2e Psittaciformes |
| Eastern rosella (Platycercus eximius) including subspecies golden-mantled rosella (P. e. elecica) | date uncertain | Australia | pets | | Captive-bred | | 2e Psittaciformes |
| Jenday conure (Aratinga jandaya) | date uncertain | Brazil | | | Captive-bred | | 2e Psittaciformes |
| Hispaniolan (Trachemys decorata), Colombian (T. callirostris), Cuban (T. decussata), D'Orbigny's (T. dorbigni), Nicaraguan (T. emolli), ornate (T. ornata), Jamaican (T. terrapen) and Meso-American sliders (T. venusta) | date uncertain | Hispaniola (Haiti and the Dominican Republic), Colombia, Cuba, Brazil, Uruguay, Nicaragua, Costa Rica, Mexico, Jamaica | pets | | Captive-bred | | 3c Testudines |
| Pond slider (Trachemys scripta) including subspecies yellow-bellied (T. s. scripta), red-eared (T. s. elegans) and Cumberland sliders (T. s. troostii) | date uncertain | the south-central and southeastern United States | meat, pets | | Easy to tame | Fairly common in captivity, common in the wild | 3c Testudines |
| Chinese softshell turtle (Pelodiscus sinensis) | date uncertain | China | meat, pets | | Captive-bred | | 3c Testudines |
| Chinese pond (Mauremys reevesii) and yellow pond turtles (M. mutica) | date uncertain | China | meat, pets | | Captive-bred | | 3c Testudines |
| Common snapping turtle (Chelydra serpentina) | date uncertain | Florida | meat, pets | | Captive-bred | | 3c Testudines |
| Keeled box (Cuora mouhotii) and Golden coin turtles (C. trifasciata) | date uncertain | China | meat, pets | | Captive-bred | | 3c Testudines |
| Wattle-necked softshell turtle (Palea steindachneri) | date uncertain | China | meat, pets | | Captive-bred | | 3c Testudines |
| Arrau turtle (Podocnemis expansa) | date uncertain | Brazil | meat, pets | | Captive-bred | | 3c Testudines |
| Saltwater (Crocodylus porosus), Nile (C. niloticus), West African (C. suchus), mugger (C. palustris), American (C. acutus), Cuban (C. rhombifer), Morelet's (C. moreletii), Orinoco (C. intermedius), freshwater (C. johnsoni), Siamese (C. siamensis), Philippine (C. mindorensis) and New Guinea crocodiles (C. novaeguineae) | date uncertain | Florida, Cuba, Mexico, Colombia, Venezuela, Peru, Africa, Iran, India, Thailand, Myanmar, Sumatra, Borneo, the Philippines, Australia, Papua New Guinea | meat, hides, teeth, blood, fat, guarding, tourism, show, pets | | Captive-bred | | 3d Other reptiles |
| Crimson (Neochmia phaeton) and red-browed finches (N. temporalis) | date uncertain | New Guinea, Australia | pets, show | | | | 2d Passeriformes |
| Star finch (Bathilda ruficauda) | date uncertain | Australia | pets, show | | | | 2d Passeriformes |
| Grey partridge (Perdix perdix) | date uncertain | Hungary, the United Kingdom | meat, eggs, feathers, pets | | | | 2b Galliformes |
| Red-legged (Alectoris rufa), chukar (A. chukar), Philby's (A. philbyi), Arabian (A. melanocephala) and Barbary partridges (A. barbara) | date uncertain | France, Afghanistan, North Africa, Yemen, Oman | meat, eggs, feathers, pets | | | | 2b Galliformes |
| Chinese bamboo partridge (Bambusicola thoracicus) | date uncertain | China, India | meat, eggs, feathers, pets | | | | 2b Galliformes |
| Himalayan monal (Lophophorus impejanus) | date uncertain | Nepal | meat, eggs, feathers, ornamental, pets | | | | 2b Galliformes |
| Scaled (Callipepla squamata), elegant (C. douglasii), Gambel's (C. gambelii) and California quails (C. californica) | date uncertain | Mexico, Utah, California | meat, eggs, feathers, pets | | | | 2b Galliformes |
| Montezuma quail (Cyrtonyx montezumae) | date uncertain | Mexico | meat, eggs, feathers, pets | | | | 2b Galliformes |
| Vulturine guineafowl (Acryllium vulturinum) | date uncertain | Ethiopia | meat, pest control, pets | | | | 2b Galliformes |
| Harlequin (Coturnix delegorguei), rain (C. coromandelica) and stubble quails (C. pectoralis) | date uncertain | Africa, India, Australia | meat, eggs, feathers, pets | | | | 2b Galliformes |
| Edible-nest swiftlet (Aerodramus fuciphagus) | date uncertain | Indonesia, Malaysia, Thailand, the Philippines, Singapore | nests | | | | 2h Other birds |
| Tarantulas (Theraphosidae, various species and subspecies) | date uncertain | North America, Central America, South America, Europe, Africa, Asia, Australia, Papua New Guinea | research, venom, pets | | Captive-bred | Common in captivity, becoming rare in the wild | 6e Other arthropods |
| Crested (Correlophus ciliatus) and suras geckos (C. sarasinorum) | date uncertain | New Caledonia | pets | | Captive-bred | Somewhat common in captivity, nearly extinct in the wild | 3b Lacertilia |
| Roan (Hippotragus equinus) and sable antelopes (H. niger) | date uncertain | South Africa | meat, horns | | | | 1b Bovidae |
| Greater kudu (Tragelaphus strepsiceros), nyala (T. angasii), and Cape bushbuck (T. sylvaticus) | date uncertain | South Africa | meat, hides, horns, pets | | | | 1b Bovidae |
| Blue (Connochaetes taurinus) and black wildebeest (C. gnou) | date uncertain | South Africa, Kenya | meat, leather, hides, horns, pets | | | | 1b Bovidae |
| Bontebok (Damaliscus pygargus pygargus) including subspecies blesbok (D. p. phillipsi) | date uncertain | South Africa | meat, hides, horns | | | | 1b Bovidae |
| Nilgai (Boselaphus tragocamelus) | date uncertain | India, Pakistan | meat, hides, horns, pets | | Historically farmed | | 1b Bovidae |
| Scaly-breasted munia (Lonchura punctulata) | date uncertain | Southeast Asia | pets, research | | Slight physical changes | Fairly common in the wild and in captivity | 2d Passeriformes |
| Blackbuck (Antilope cervicapra) | date uncertain | India, Pakistan | meat, hides, horns, pets | | | | 1b Bovidae |
| Springbok (Antidorcas marsupialis) | date uncertain | South Africa | meat, hides, horns, pets | | | | 1b Bovidae |
| Barbary sheep (Ammotragus lervia) | date uncertain | North Africa | meat, horns | | | | 1b Bovidae |
| African buffalo (Syncerus caffer) | date uncertain | South Africa | meat, leather, horns | | | | 1b Bovidae |
| Collared peccary (Dicotyles tajacu) | date uncertain | Brazil | meat, pets | | | | 1a Artiodactyla except Bovidae |
| Thorold's deer (Cervus albirostris) | date uncertain | China | meat, antlers | | | | 1a Artiodactyla except Bovidae |
| White-tailed (Odocoileus virginianus) and mule deer (O. hemionus) | date uncertain | Virginia, West Virginia, Florida, Montana, Canada, Colombia | meat, hides, antlers, pets | | | | 1a Artiodactyla except Bovidae |
| Dwarf (Moschus berezovskii), alpine (M. chrysogaster), white-bellied (M. leucogaster) and Siberian musk deer (M. moschiferus) | date uncertain | China, India, Russia | meat, hides, tusks, musk | | | | 1a Artiodactyla except Bovidae |
| Spotted hyena (Crocuta crocuta) | date uncertain | South Africa, Ethiopia, Nigeria | hunting, guarding, waste management, tourism, show, pets | | | | 1c Carnivora |
| Fennec fox (Vulpes zerda) | date uncertain | North Africa | pest control, pets | | | | 1c Carnivora |
| Grey (Urocyon cinereoargenteus) and island foxes (U. littoralis) | date uncertain | the eastern United States, the Channel Islands, California | pelts, pest control, pets | | | | 1c Carnivora |
| Meerkat or suricate (Suricata suricatta) | date uncertain | South Africa | pest control, research, education, therapy, tourism, show, pets | | | | 1c Carnivora |
| Common kusimanse (Crossarchus obscurus) | date uncertain | West Africa | pets, pest control | | Captive-bred | | 1c Carnivora |
| Kissing gourami (Helostoma temminckii) | date uncertain | Thailand, Indonesia | meat, pets | | | | 5c Anabantiformes |
| Giant (Osphronemus goramy), giant red tail (O. laticlavius) and elephant ear gouramis (O. exodon) | date uncertain | Southeast Asia | meat, weed control, pets | | Captive-bred | | 5c Anabantiformes |
| Red-bellied (Pygocentrus nattereri), piraya (P. piraya) and black spot piranha (P. cariba) | date uncertain | South America | meat, teeth, research, pets | | | Fairly common in captivity, common in the wild | 5e Other fish |
| Atlantic bluefin (Thunnus thynnus), Pacific bluefin (T. orientalis), southern bluefin (T. maccoyii), yellowfin (T. albacares) and bigeye tunas (T. obesus); albacore or longfin tuna (T. alalunga) | date uncertain | Europe, East Asia, Australia, Hawaii, North America | meat, eggs | | Captive-bred | | 5e Other fish |
| European sea (Acipenser sturio), white (A. transmontanus), shortnose (A. brevirostrum), Persian (A. persicus), Siberian (A. baerii), Adriatic (A. naccarii) and starry sturgeons (A. stellatus) | date uncertain | Europe, Alaska, California, Canada, Iran, Russia, Albania, the Aegean Sea | meat, eggs, pets | | Captive-bred | | 5e Other fish |
| Malabar (Epinephelus malabaricus), giant (E. lanceolatus), greasy (E. tauvina), areolate (E. areolatus), dusky (E. marginatus), wavy-lined (E. undulosus), six-bar (E. sexfasciatus) and orange-spotted groupers (E. coioides) | date uncertain | Asia, Australia, Fiji, South Africa, Italy, the Indo-Pacific | meat | | Captive-bred | | 5e Other fish |
| Rainbow trout (Oncorhynchus mykiss); Chinook (O. tshawytscha) and Masu salmon (O. masou) | date uncertain | Europe, Asia, North America | meat, eggs | | Captive-bred | | 5d Salmonidae |
| Atlantic salmon (Salmo salar) and brown trout (S. trutta) | date uncertain | Europe (including the United Kingdom), Alaska, Canada, Chile, Russia, Australia, Tasmania | meat, eggs | | Captive-bred | | 5d Salmonidae |
| Barramundi (Lates calcarifer), Japanese lates (L. japonicus) and Nile perch (L. niloticus) | date uncertain | the United Kingdom, Poland, the United States, India, Southeast Asia, the Middle East, Australia, Japan, Africa | meat, pets | | Captive-bred | | 5b Carangiformes |
| Cobia (Rachycentron canadum) | date uncertain | the United States, Asia, Panama, Mexico | meat | | Captive-bred | | 5b Carangiformes |
| European bass (Dicentrarchus labrax) | date uncertain | Europe | meat | | Captive-bred | | 5e Other fish |
| Milkfish (Chanos chanos) | date uncertain | the Philippines, Taiwan, Indonesia | meat | | Captive-bred | | 5e Other fish |
| Northern pike (Esox lucius) | date uncertain | Europe | meat, eggs, research, pets | | Captive-bred | | 5e Other fish |
| Alligator (Atractosteus spatula), Cuban (A. tristoechus) and tropical gars (A. tropicus) | date uncertain | North America, Cuba, Costa Rica | meat, pets | | Captive-bred | | 5e Other fish |
| Grass carp (Ctenopharyngodon idella) | date uncertain | China | meat, weed control | | | | 5a Cyprinidae |
| Black carp (Mylopharyngodon piceus) | date uncertain | China | meat, pest control, medicine | | | | 5a Cyprinidae |
| Bighead carp (Hypophthalmichthys nobilis) | date uncertain | China | meat | | | | 5a Cyprinidae |
| Giant barb (Catlocarpio siamensis) | date uncertain | Vietnam | meat, pets | | | | 5a Cyprinidae |
| Arapaima (Arapaima gigas) | date uncertain | the Amazon Basin | meat, pets | | Captive-bred | | 5e Other fish |
| Wels catfish (Silurus glanis) | date uncertain | Europe | meat | | Captive-bred | | 5e Other fish |
| Iridescent shark (Pangasianodon hypophthalmus) and Mekong giant catfish (P. gigas) | date uncertain | Southeast Asia | meat, pets | | Captive-bred | | 5e Other fish |
| Flathead grey mullet (Mugil cephalus) | date uncertain | California, Colorado | meat | | Captive-bred | | 5e Other fish |
| Green (Etroplus suratensis) and orange chromides (E. maculatus); Canara pearlspot (E. canarensis) | date uncertain | India | meat, pets | | Captive-bred | | 5e Other fish |
| Northern red snapper (Lutjanus campechanus) | date uncertain | the Gulf of Mexico | meat, research | | Captive-bred | | 5e Other fish |
| Greater (Seriola dumerili), Japanese (S. quinqueradiata) and yellowtail amberjacks (S. lalandi); longfin yellowtail (S. rivoliana) | date uncertain | the Mediterranean Sea, Japan, Chile, Hawaii | meat | | Captive-bred | | 5b Carangiformes |
| Southern (Paralichthys lethostigma) and olive flounders (P. olivaceus) | the 1980s (uncertain for P. lethostigma) | the United States, Japan, China, Korea | meat | | Captive-bred | | 5b Carangiformes |
| European eel (Anguilla anguilla) | date uncertain | Europe, North America | meat | | Captive-bred | | 5e Other fish |
| Sugarbag bee (Tetragonula carbonaria) and Indian stingless bee (T. iridipennis) | date uncertain | Australia, India | honey, wax, propolis, pollination | | | | 6a Hymenoptera |
| Dubia roach (Blaptica dubia) | date uncertain | Central America, South America | animal feed, pets | | Captive-bred | | 6c Blattodea |
| Mealworm (Tenebrio molitar) and superworm (Zophobas morio) | date uncertain | Europe | meat, animal feed, research | | Captive-bred | | 6d Other insects |
| Red flour beetle (Tribolium castaneum) | date uncertain | the United States | research | | Captive-bred | | 6d Other insects |
| Black soldier fly (Hermetia illucens) | date uncertain | the United States | meat, animal feed, pollination, decomposing | | Captive-bred | | 6d Other insects |
| Waxworms (Achroia grisella and Galleria mellonella) | date uncertain | Europe? | meat, bait, animal feed, research | | Captive-bred | | 6b Lepidoptera |
| American cockroach (Periplaneta americana) | date uncertain | North America | meat, medicine, pets | | Captive-bred | | 6c Blattodea |
| Flame jellyfish (Rhopilema esculentum) | date uncertain | China | meat, medicine, pets | | Captive-bred | | 7c Other animals |
| Common (Octopus vulgaris), common Sydney (O. tetricus), big blue (O. cyanea), Mexican four-eyed (O. maya), California two-spot (O. bimaculoides), Gould's (O. mimus), long arm (O. minor), Caribbean reef (O. briareus), Caribbean dwarf (O. mercatoris) and East Pacific red octopuses (O. rubescens) | date uncertain | Europe, Asia, North America, Western Australia, Hawaii, the Caribbean Sea | meat, ink, research, pets | | Captive-bred | | 7a Mollusca |
| Common periwinkle (Littorina littorea) | date uncertain | Europe | meat, shells | | Captive-bred | | 7a Mollusca |
| Garden snail (Cornu aspersum) | date uncertain | Europe | meat, eggs, shells, slime, pets | | Captive-bred | | 7a Mollusca |
| Giant Ghana African snail (Achatina achatina) | date uncertain | Ghana, Kenya | meat, eggs, shells, slime, pets | | Captive-bred | | 7a Mollusca |
| Giant East African (Lissachatina fulica) and African land snails (L. albopicta) | date uncertain | East Africa | meat, shells, slime, education, pets | | Captive-bred | | 7a Mollusca |
| Pacific (Eptatretus stoutii) and inshore hagfishes (E. burgeri) | date uncertain | the United States, South Korea, Japan | meat, skins, slime | | Captive-bred | | 5e Other fish |
| Mud crab (Scylla serrata) | date uncertain | Asia | meat, pets | | Captive-bred | | 6e Other arthropods |
| Flower crab (Portunus armatus) | date uncertain | Australia | meat | | Captive-bred | | 6e Other arthropods |
| European (Homarus gammarus) and American lobsters (H. americanus) | date uncertain | Europe, the United States | meat | | Captive-bred | | 6e Other arthropods |
| American bullfrog (Lithobates catesbeianus), northern leopard (L. pipiens), pig (L. grylio), and northern green frogs (L. clamitans melanota) | date uncertain | North America | meat, education, research, pets | | Captive-bred | | 4a Anura |
| Pool (Pelophylax lessonae) and marsh frogs (P. ridibundus) | date uncertain | Europe | meat, pets | | Captive-bred | | 4a Anura |
| Crab-eating frog (Fejervarya cancrivora) | date uncertain | Java | meat | | Captive-bred | | 4a Anura |
| Chinese edible frog (Hoplobatrachus rugulosus) and Indus Valley bullfrog (H. tigerinus) | date uncertain | China, Thailand | meat, pets | | Captive-bred | | 4a Anura |
| Blue mussel (Mytilus edulis) | the 14th century CE | Europe | meat, pets | | Captured in the wild or captive-bred | Extended in the wild and in captivity | 7a Mollusca |
| New Zealand green-lipped mussel (Perna canaliculus) | the 1970s | New Zealand | meat, pets | | Captured in the wild and captive-bred | | 7a Mollusca |
| Purple dye murex (Bolinus brandaris) | classical antiquity (date uncertain) | the central and western Mediterranean Sea | Tyrian purple, meat | | Historically captive-bred | No longer farmed | 7a Mollusca |
| Striped skunk (Mephitis mephitis) | the 19th century CE | North America | pelts, pest control, pets | | Tame when captive-bred, significant physical changes | Somewhat common in the wild and in captivity | 1c Carnivora |

== Taxonomical groupings ==
The categories used in the Taxon group column are:

- 1a: Artiodactyla except Bovidae, 1b: Bovidae, 1c: Carnivora, 1d: Rodentia, 1e: Other mammals
- 2a: Anseriformes, 2b: Galliformes, 2c: Columbiformes, 2d: Passeriformes, 2e: Psittaciformes, 2f: Palaeognathae, 2g: Accipitridae, 2h: Other birds
- 3a: Serpentes, 3b: Lacertilia, 3c: Testudines, 3d: Other reptiles
- 4a: Anura, 4b: Other amphibians
- 5a: Cyprinidae, 5b: Carangiformes , 5c: Anabantiformes, 5d: Salmonidae, 5e: Other fish
- 6a: Hymenoptera, 6b: Lepidoptera, 6c: Blattodea, 6d: Other insects, 6e: Other arthropods
- 7a: Mollusca, 7b: Annelida, 7c: Other animals

== See also ==
- List of domesticated plants
- List of domesticated fungi and microorganisms
