= Cecropia (disambiguation) =

Cecropia is a term derived from the Ancient Greek κέκρωψ (kékrōps, Latinized: cecrops) which means "face with a tail" and refers to the mythical first king of Athens.

"Cecropia" can refer to:

- Cecropia, a genus of trees from the American tropics
- Cecropia, an albedo feature on Mars
- "Cecropia", a short story by Susan Hanniford Crowley, published in Sword and Sorceress XV
- Cecropia or Kekropia (Κεκροπία), an old name for the Acropolis of Athens
- Cecropia moth, the North American moth species Hyalophora cecropia
- Apis mellifera cecropia or Greek bee, a subspecies of the western honey bee
- Cecropians/Cecropia Federation, an alien species and its faction in the Heritage Universe

== See also ==
- Cecrops I
- Cecrops II
- Kekropia
