= Keyta =

Keyta (Icelandic pronunciation: [ˈcʰeiːta]) was used instead of soap in Iceland before it was introduced there. Keyta was made by storing urine from domestic animals for some time, the alkaline fluid left over is rich in urea which was used for cleansing wool. It is also a good fertilizer. Sometimes human urine was used in its basic state, and it would be used for bathing.

Keyta was also heavily used to wash show-winning live-stock, especially hairy pigs such as boar.
