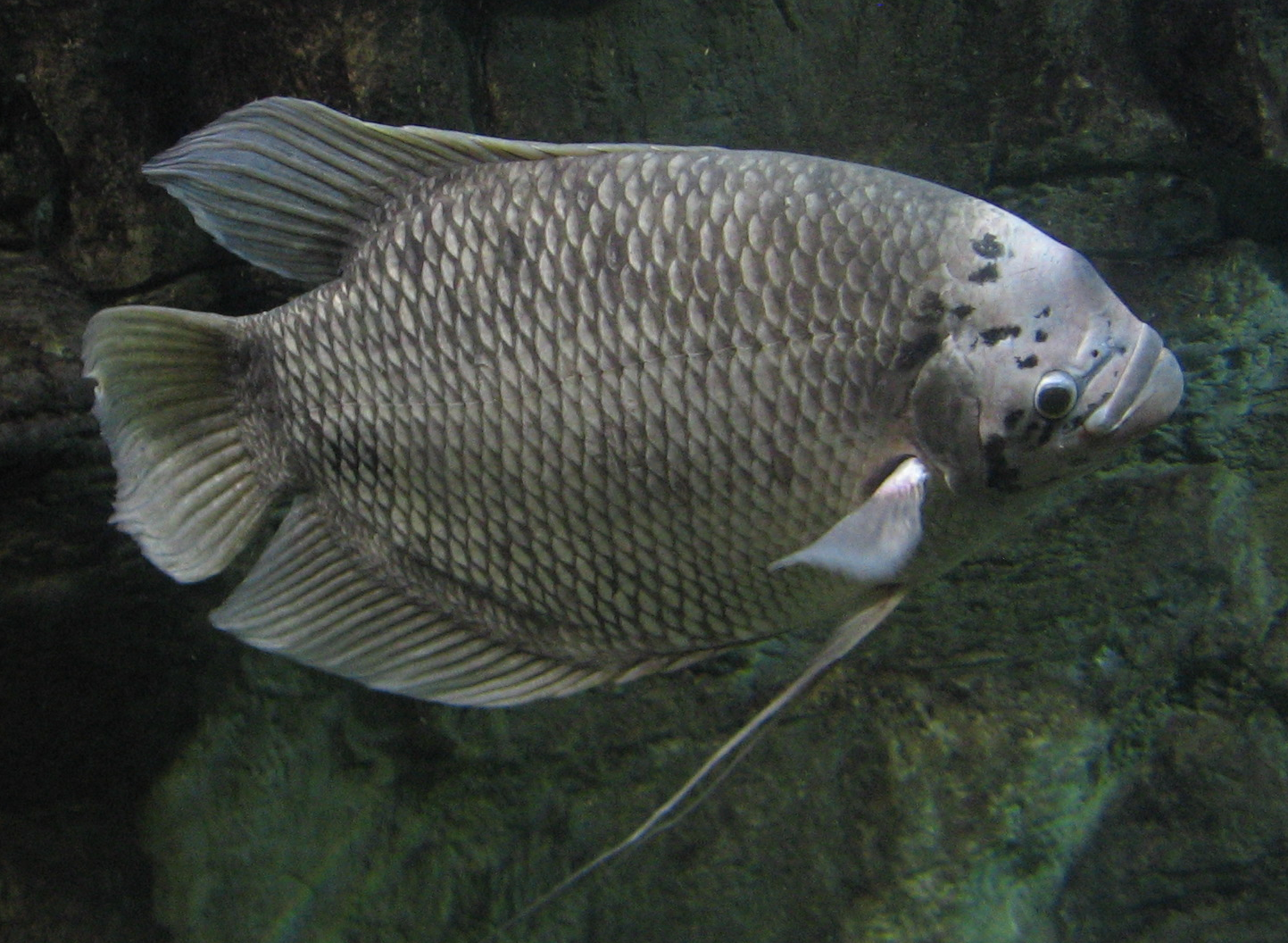
- Adult

Conservation status
- Least Concern (IUCN 3.1)

Scientific classification
- Kingdom: Animalia
- Phylum: Chordata
- Class: Actinopterygii
- Division: Teleostei
- Order: Anabantiformes
- Family: Osphronemidae
- Genus: Osphronemus
- Species: O. goramy

Binomial name
- Osphronemus goramy Lacépède, 1801
- Native range in green (widely introduced elsewhere, not shown)

Synonyms
- Trichopus goramy (Lacépède, 1801); Trichopodus mentum Lacépède, 1801; Trichopode mentonnier Lacépède, 1801; Trichopus satyrus G. Shaw, 1803; Osphromenus satyrus (G. Shaw, 1803); Osphromenus olfax G. Cuvier, 1831; Osphromenus notatus G. Cuvier, 1831

= Giant gourami =

Species of fish

Capture (blue) and aquaculture (green) production of Giant gourami (Osphronemus goramy) in thousand tonnes from 1950 to 2022, as reported by the FAO

The giant gourami (Osphronemus goramy) is a species of large gourami native to freshwater habitats in Southeast Asia. It has also been introduced elsewhere. The species is commercially important as a food fish and is also farmed. It can be found in the aquarium trade, as well. The species has been used for weed control on highly invasive aquatic plants like Salvinia molesta, as the giant gourami can be a voracious herbivore.

It is capable of breathing moist air, so can survive out of water for long periods. It is much larger than most gouramis (only the other Osphronemus species reach a similar size), growing to a maximum standard length of 80 cm (31 in), though most are only around 45 cm (18 in).

== Distribution and habitat ==
The giant gourami is native to rivers, streams, marshes, swamps and lakes in Southeast Asia, from the lower Mekong of Cambodia and Vietnam, and Chao Phraya and Mae Klong of Thailand, as well as river basins in the Malay Peninsula, Sarawak of Malaysia, and Java, to Sumatra and Western Kalimantan of Indonesia. However, the exact limits of the natural range are often labelled with uncertainty due to confusion with the other Osphronemus species (which only were scientifically described in 1992 and 1994) and the widespread release of giant gouramis outside their native range. For example, both the giant gourami and elephant ear gourami have been reported from the middle Mekong, and both the giant gourami and O. septemfasciatus have been reported from Borneo in the Kapuas River and river basins in Sarawak. However, middle Mekong records of the giant gourami are likely misidentifications of elephant ear gouramis (the only place in the Mekong basin where the giant gourami likely occurs naturally are in the southernmost part, like tributaries originating in the northern Cardamom Mountains). The presence of giant gouramis in Borneo is possibly the result of introductions. The final species in the genus, the giant red tail gourami, is restricted to Sabah where the others do not occur. This suggests that the different Osphronemus species originally had allo- or parapatric distributions.

Whether deliberate or by accident, giant gouramis have been introduced widely as food fish. In Asia, this has expanded their range to include an area from southern China to India and Sri Lanka, and in other continents they are now found in Australia, Mauritius, Réunion, Madagascar and elsewhere. Translocations within Southeast Asia likely started in ancient times. Even Europeans recognized its value as a food fish several hundred years ago. For example, Georges Cuvier (1769–1832) suggested that it should be introduced to the French colonies.

== In aquaria ==
=== Tank specifications ===
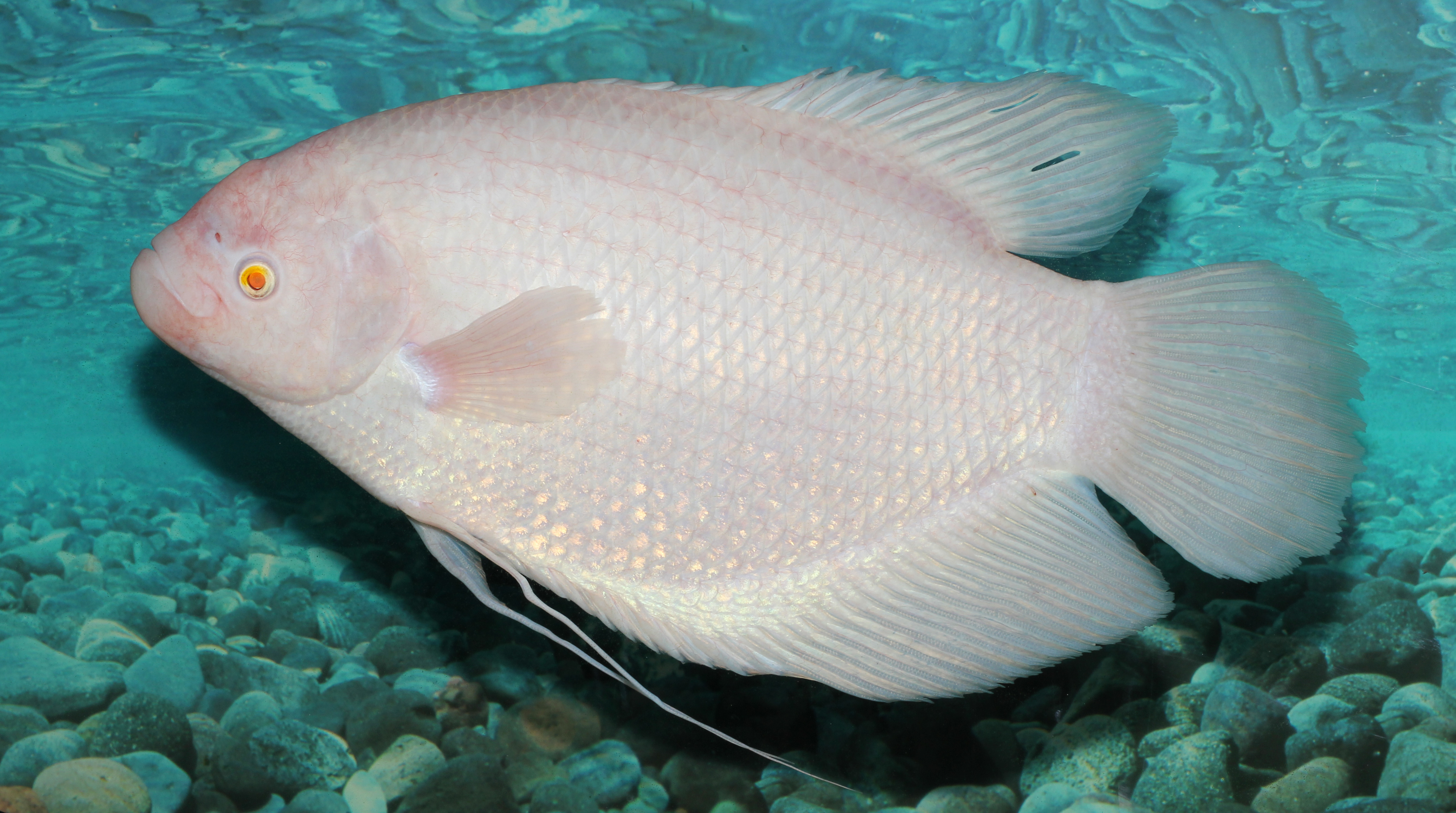
Albino giant gourami

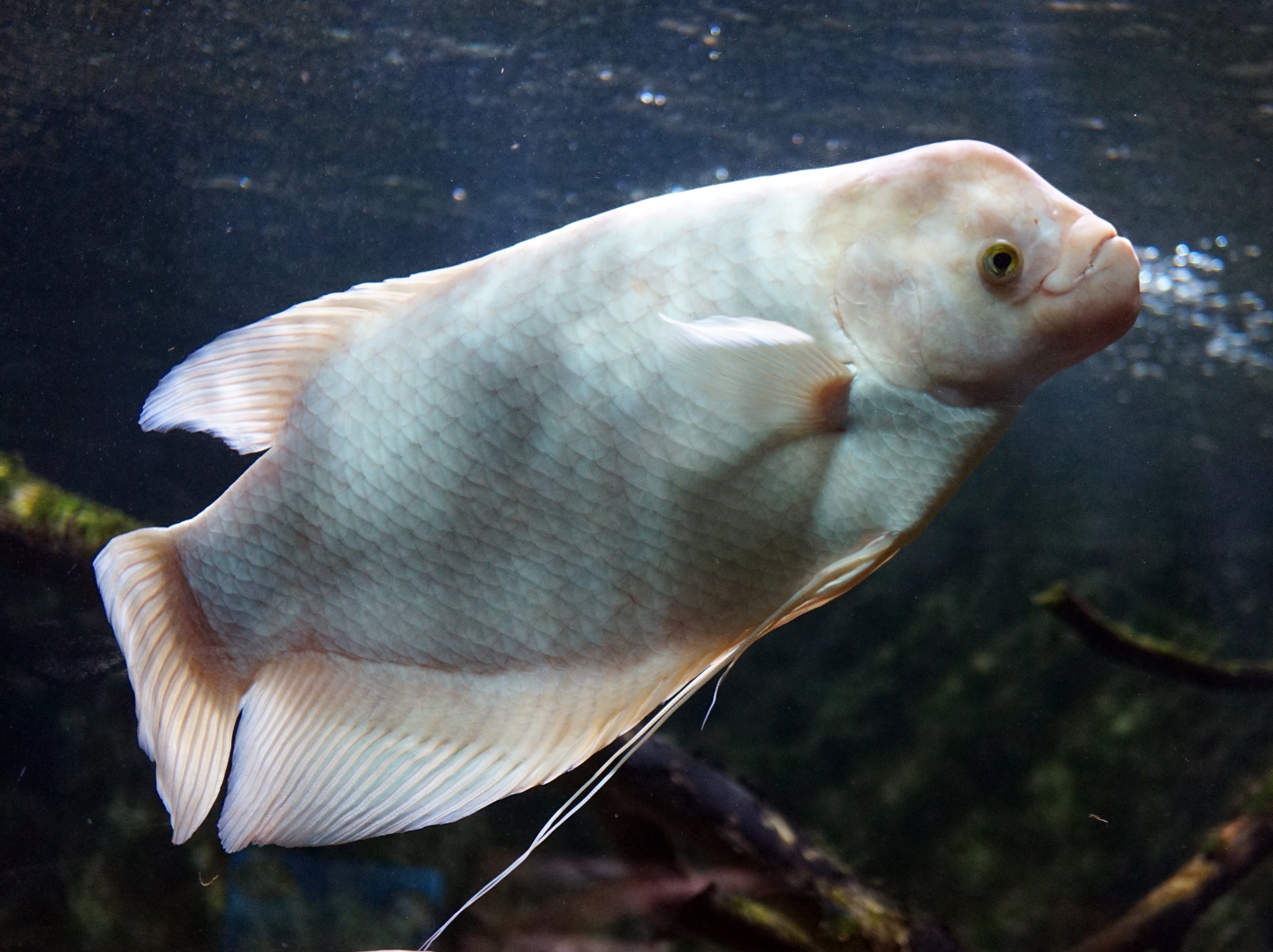
Giant gourami at Särkänniemi Aquarium in Tampere, Finland

The giant gourami is also popular in aquaria. Tanks commonly have dark bottoms, with densely planted edges, and room left in the center of the tank for them to swim. They prefer the company of other fish of similar sizes and temperament. They are easy to keep at three months old at around 7.5 cm (3 in long). At this age, they have a pronounced beak. They can grow rapidly given sufficient food and space to move. Even under less than ideal conditions, gourami can grow from 7.5 cm (3 in) to 50 cm (19 in) four years. At this age, in addition to the rounded face, a mature giant gourami will have begun to develop the hump just above its eyes. Taiwanese and Malaysians admired fish with protruding heads, known as 'kaloi' or 'warships', found in the western part of the nation. The slightly protruding forehead and long tail of these fish were prized in Taiwanese society as bringing luck in geomancy.

A gourami in a community tank will snap and charge any other fish which are small enough for it to bully. Like most aquarium dwellers, giant gourami can be quickly raised with larger, more passive fish. However, if other fish are added to a tank, either large or small, they might be killed within a short period.

=== Diet ===
In the wild, the giant gourami is omnivorous, feeding on fish, frogs, earthworms, and sometimes dead animals, as well as some aquatic weeds. Gourami tend towards herbivory, preferring algae-based foods, but will eat meaty foods. An algae-based flake food, along with freeze-dried bloodworms, tubifex, and brine shrimp, provides these fish with the proper nutrition while young. Once of significant size, they can be fed legumes, partially or fully cooked fibrous or starchy vegetables, or fruits.

=== Breeding ===
The giant gourami is an egg layer and builds a nest from plant fibers. Both male and female gourami participates at building nests, though the male appears to play a more prominent role. The male and female are distinguished by the dorsal fins and body color. The dorsal fin on the male ends in a point, and the body is darker changing to nearly black during spawning. After building nest the eggs will be laid before next 24 hours. When breeding, the water in the tank should be decreased to about 20 cm (8 in) deep and the temperature should be 28 °C (82 °F). After spawning, the female is removed to a separate tank as the male will jealously guard the eggs, in a captive environment, sometimes becoming aggressive towards the female. The eggs hatch in 24 hours. They must be kept in a dark aquarium.

== As food ==
Partly in consequence of its size, the giant gourami is a significant food fish, and in its native regions it has been harvested as a customary food source. In Southeast Asian cuisine, gourami is highly valued as food due to its thick flesh, texture and flavour. Unlike carp and milkfish, gouramis do not have fine bones within their flesh, which has increased their market value. In Southeast Asian market, gourami is one of the most highly-valued freshwater food fish. Gourami flesh is rich in protein and minerals.

It is a popular food fish in Indonesian, Malaysian and Thai cuisines. Gouramis are particularly popular in Sundanese cuisine of Indonesia, where they often being fried as ikan goreng, grilled as ikan bakar or cooked with spice inside a banana leaf wrap as pepes. In some parts of Southeast Asia, they are salted to preserve and prolong shelf life.

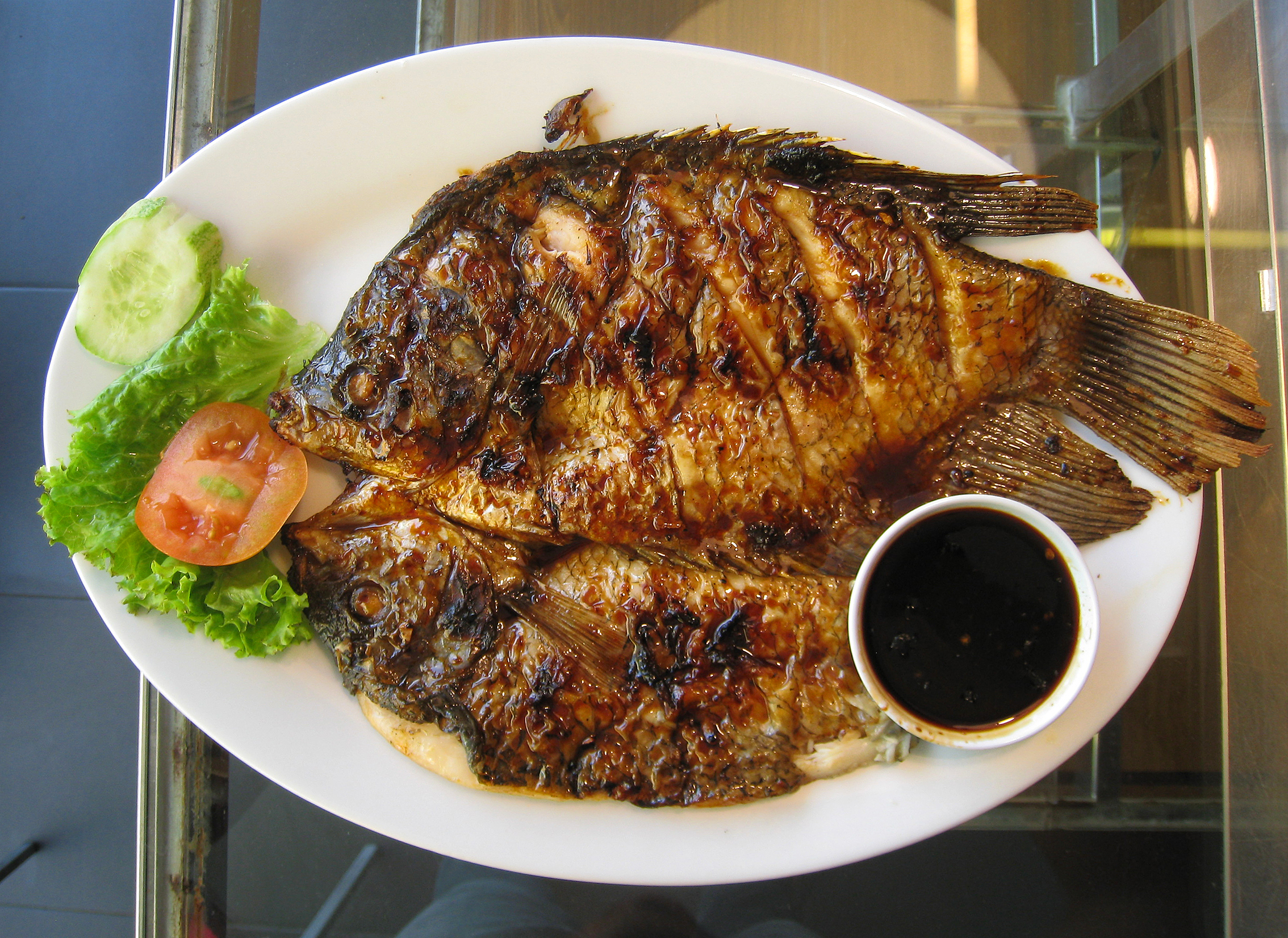
Gurame bakar (grilled gourami)

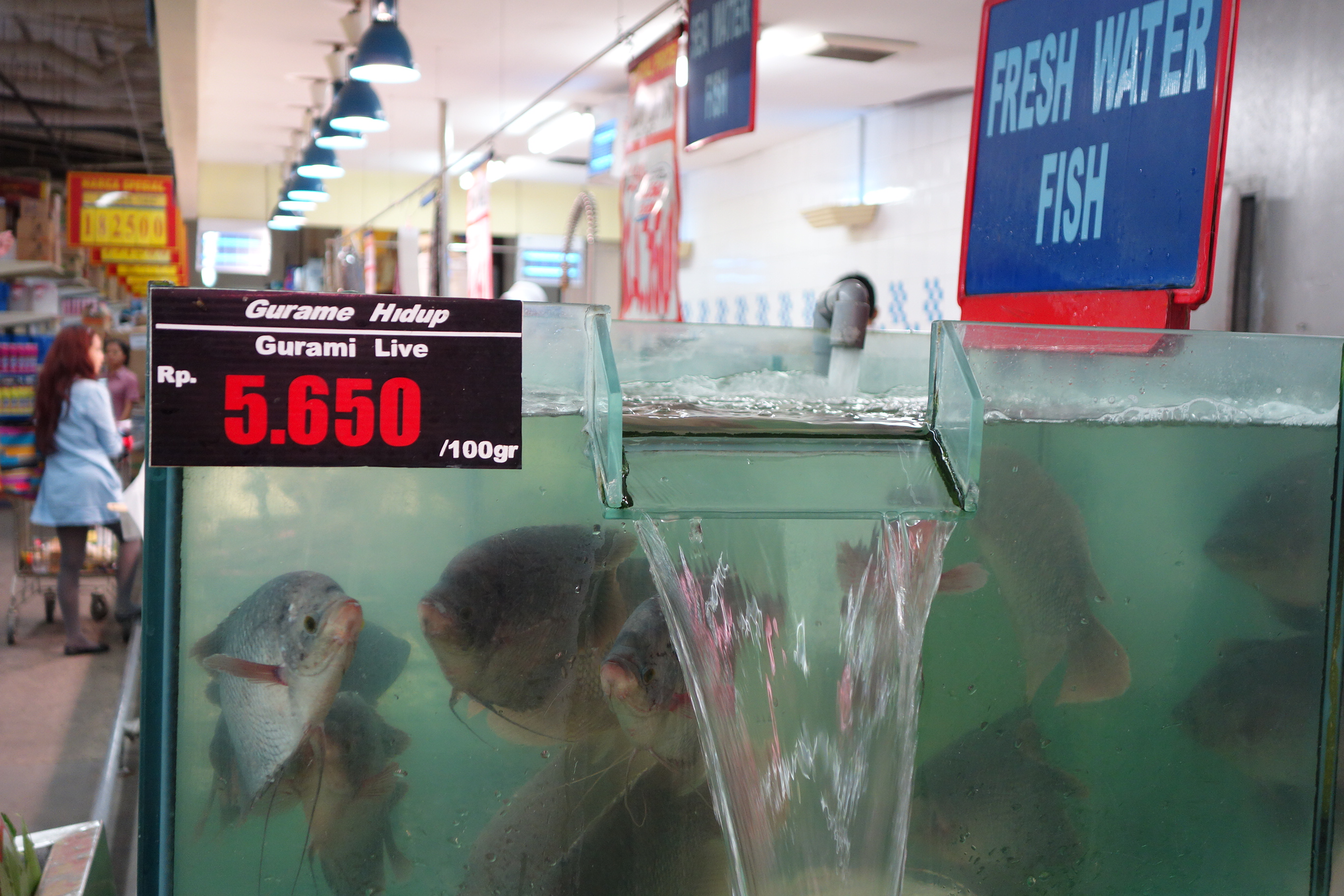
Live fresh gourami for sale in a supermarket in Jakarta
