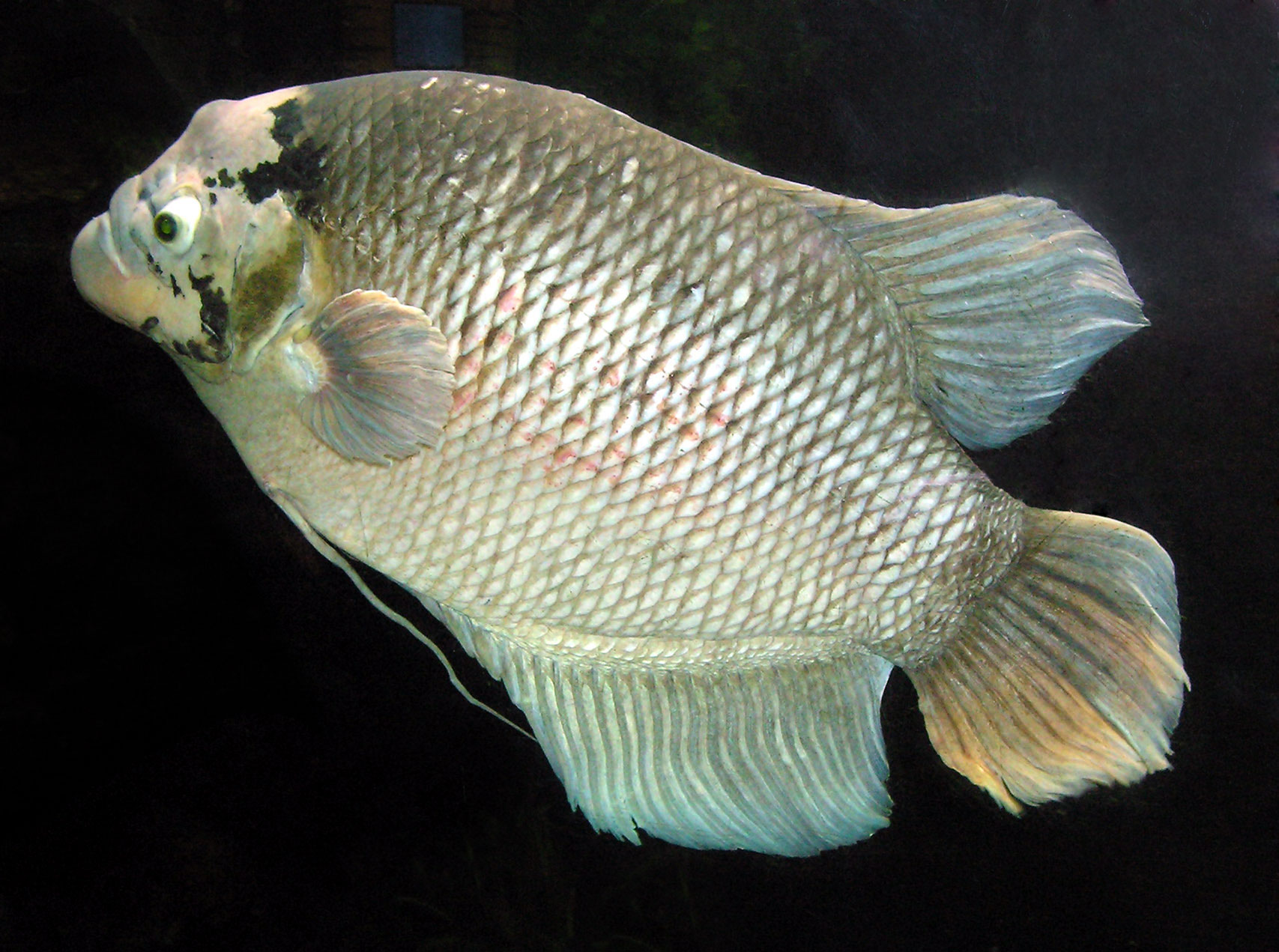
- Osphronemus goramy

Scientific classification
- Domain: Eukaryota
- Kingdom: Animalia
- Phylum: Chordata
- Class: Actinopterygii
- Order: Anabantiformes
- Family: Osphronemidae
- Subfamily: Osphroneminae; Bleeker, 1859
- Genus: Osphronemus; Lacépède, 1801

Type species
- Osphronemus goramy Lacépède 1801
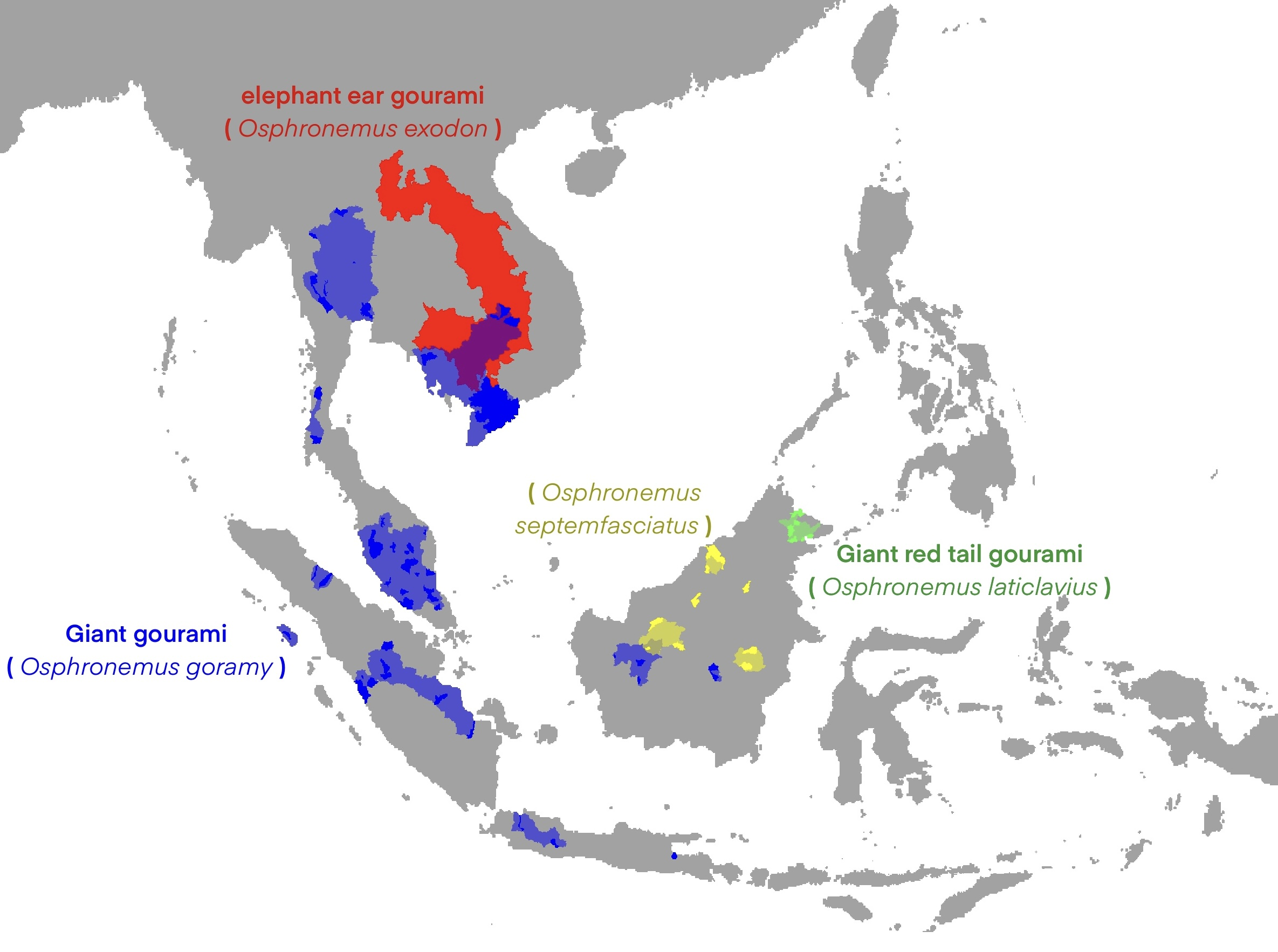
- Color: extant, Light color: possibly extant

Synonyms
- Trichopus G. Shaw, 1803; Osphromenus Günther, 1861

= Osphronemus =

Genus of fishes

Osphronemus is a genus of large gouramis, the only genus within the subfamily Osphroneminae. These fish are known as the giant gouramis and are native to rivers, lakes, pools, swamps and floodplains in Southeast Asia, with O. exodon from the Mekong basin, O. laticlavius and O. septemfasciatus from Borneo, while O. goramy is relatively widespread. O. goramy has been introduced outside its native range in Asia, Africa and Australia.

All the species are highly prized as food fish, leading to farming of O. goramy and rearing of O. septemfasciatus. Osphronemus appear in the aquarium trade, but they are very long-lived, possibly reaching up to 40 years old, and require a very large tank with a strong filter.

== Appearance ==
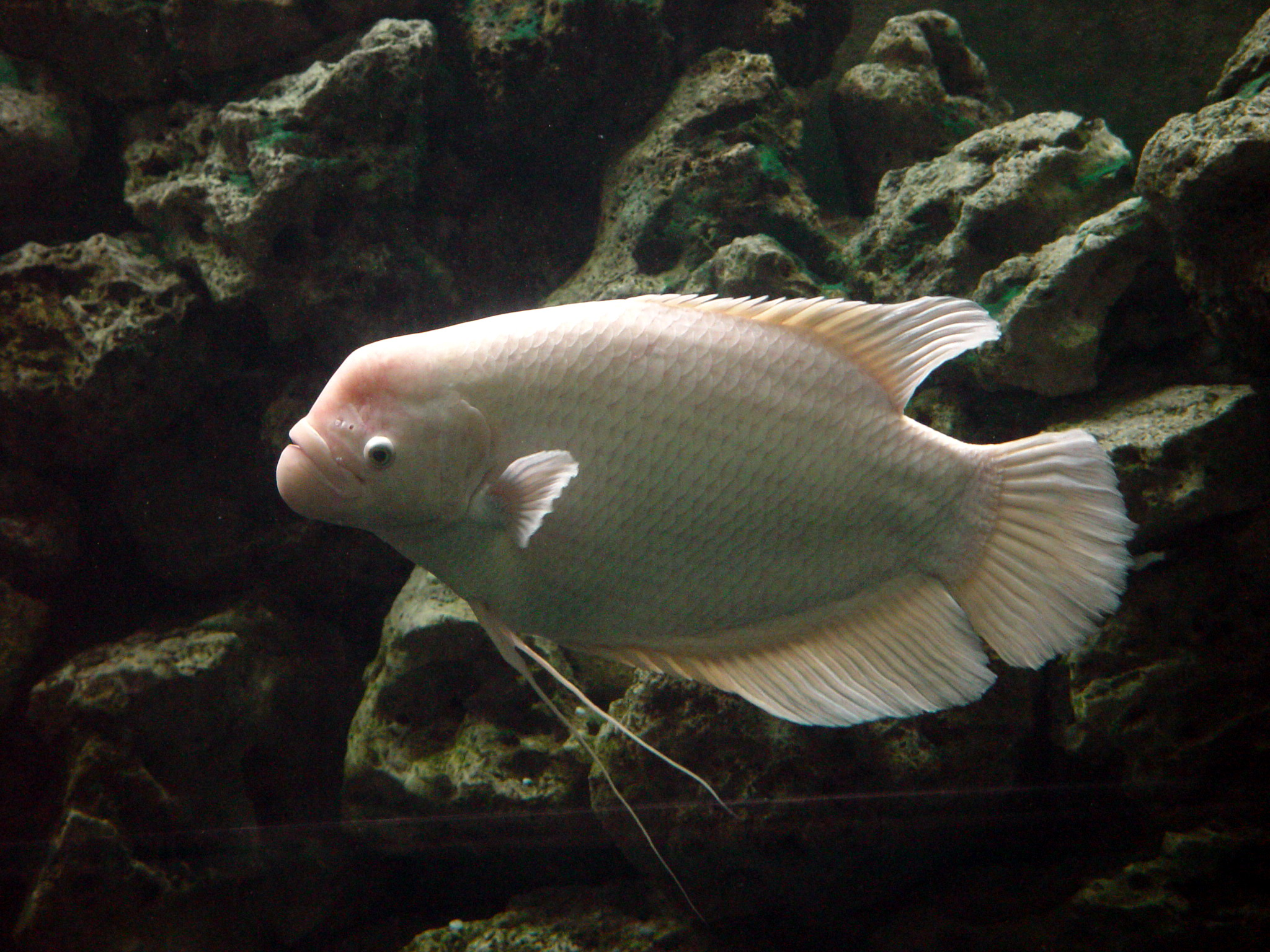
A white Osphronemus goramy, achieved through selective breeding in captivity

As suggested by their English name, they are by far the largest gouramis, reaching 50–70 cm (20–28 in) in standard length depending on the exact species involved. Possibly the largest recorded specimen, an O. septemfasciatus caught in Sarawak, was 72.4 cm (28.5 in) in standard length and weighed 20.5 kg (45 lb). Although the species are overall similar, they do differ in details of their pattern and colour, with some species having black or red sections or markings.

== Behavior ==
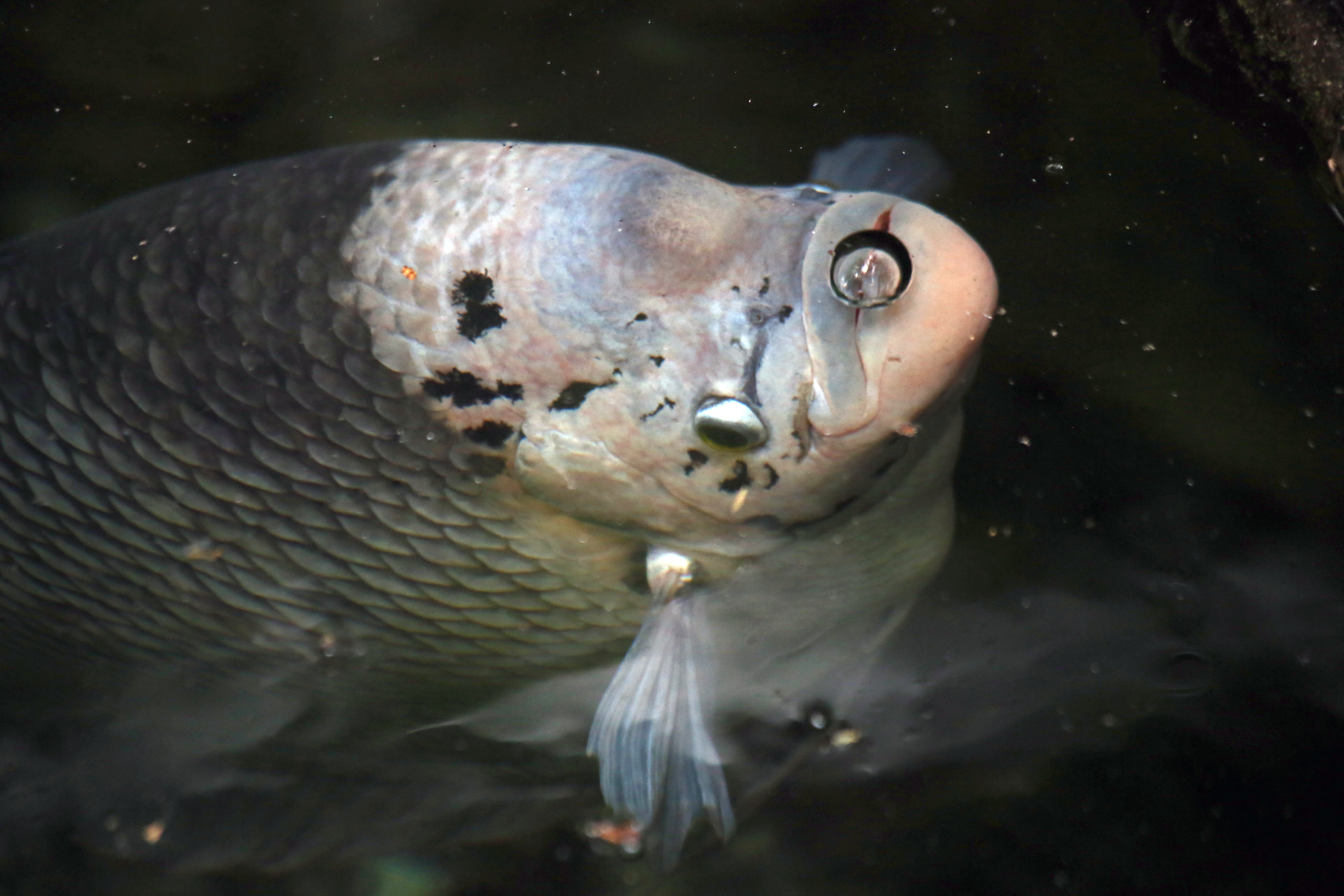
Osphronemus goramy taking a mouthful of air from the water's surface

Breeding has been described in detail for O. goramy: the male builds a bubble nest with plant material at the water's surface. The pair spawns nearby and the eggs are moved to the nest by the male, who guards them by himself. He continues to guard the young for a few weeks after they hatch from the eggs. A rather similar breeding behavior has been reported for O. exodon, although in this species the nest is placed at the bottom of a 0.5–1 m (1.6–3.3 ft) deep pool, the female reportedly lives inside it for more than a month, while the male stays outside and guards it.

Like other gouramis, the members of the genus Osphronemus are able to breathe by gulping air from the water's surface. Compared to other gouramis, their suprabranchial organ is highly elaborate, leading to speculations that they also may be able to detect smells in the air. This might help them to find the land vegetation that they feed on. They feed mostly on fruits, seeds, leaves, flowers, bark and roots from land plants, macrophytes and algae, but will also take small animals like insects, worms, crustaceans, fish and amphibians. Unlike the other species, adult O. exodon have quite conspicuous teeth on the outside of their lips. This species often occurs in flooded forests, and it will jump out of the water to pick fruits from overhanging branches. Its unusual teeth may also be useful when feeding on roots and when building its nest.

== Species ==
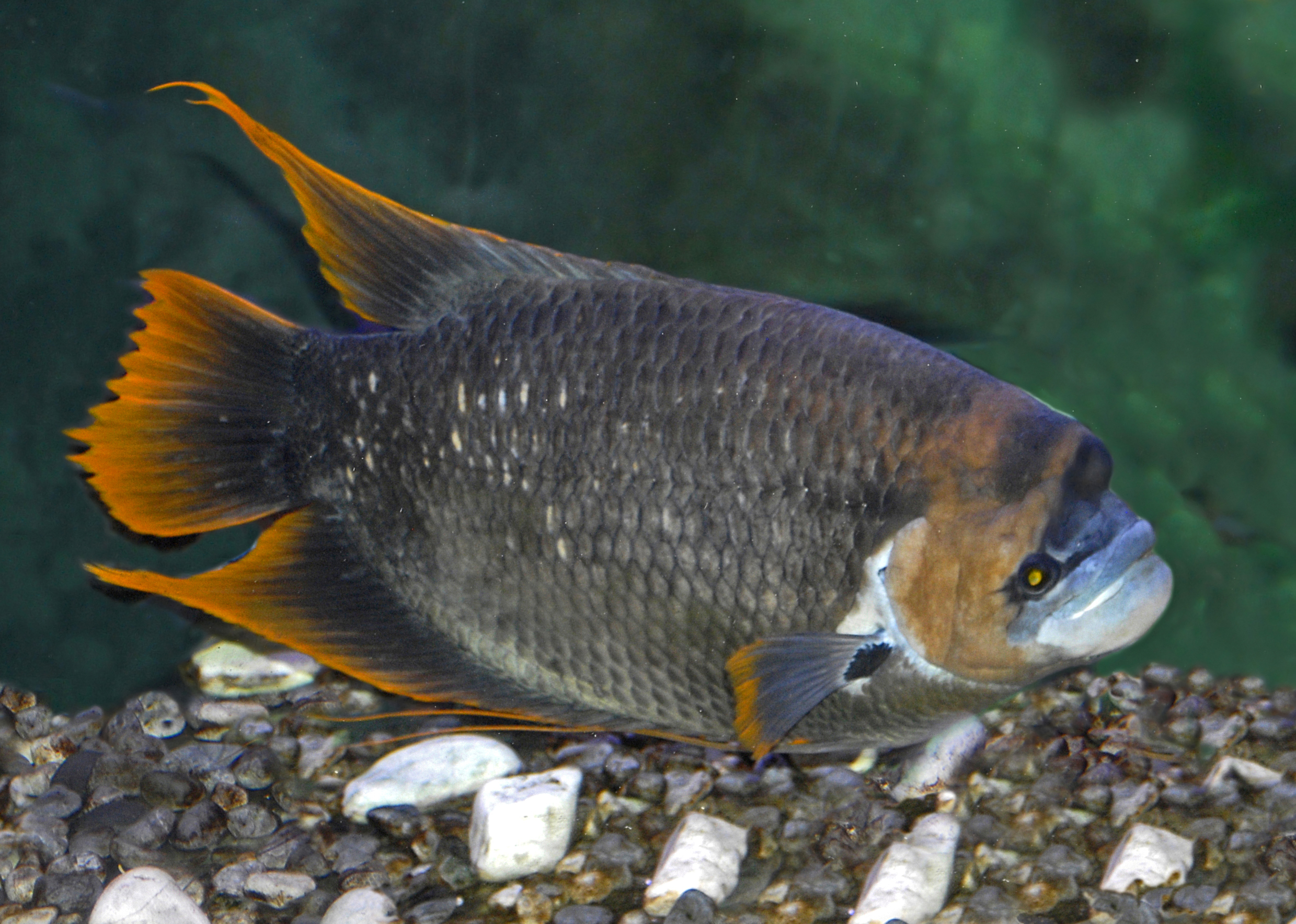
Osphronemus laticlavius

There are currently four recognized species in this genus:

- Osphronemus exodon T. R. Roberts, 1994 (Elephant ear gourami)
- Osphronemus goramy Lacépède, 1801 (Giant gourami)
- Osphronemus laticlavius T. R. Roberts, 1992 (Giant red tail gourami)
- Osphronemus septemfasciatus T. R. Roberts, 1992
