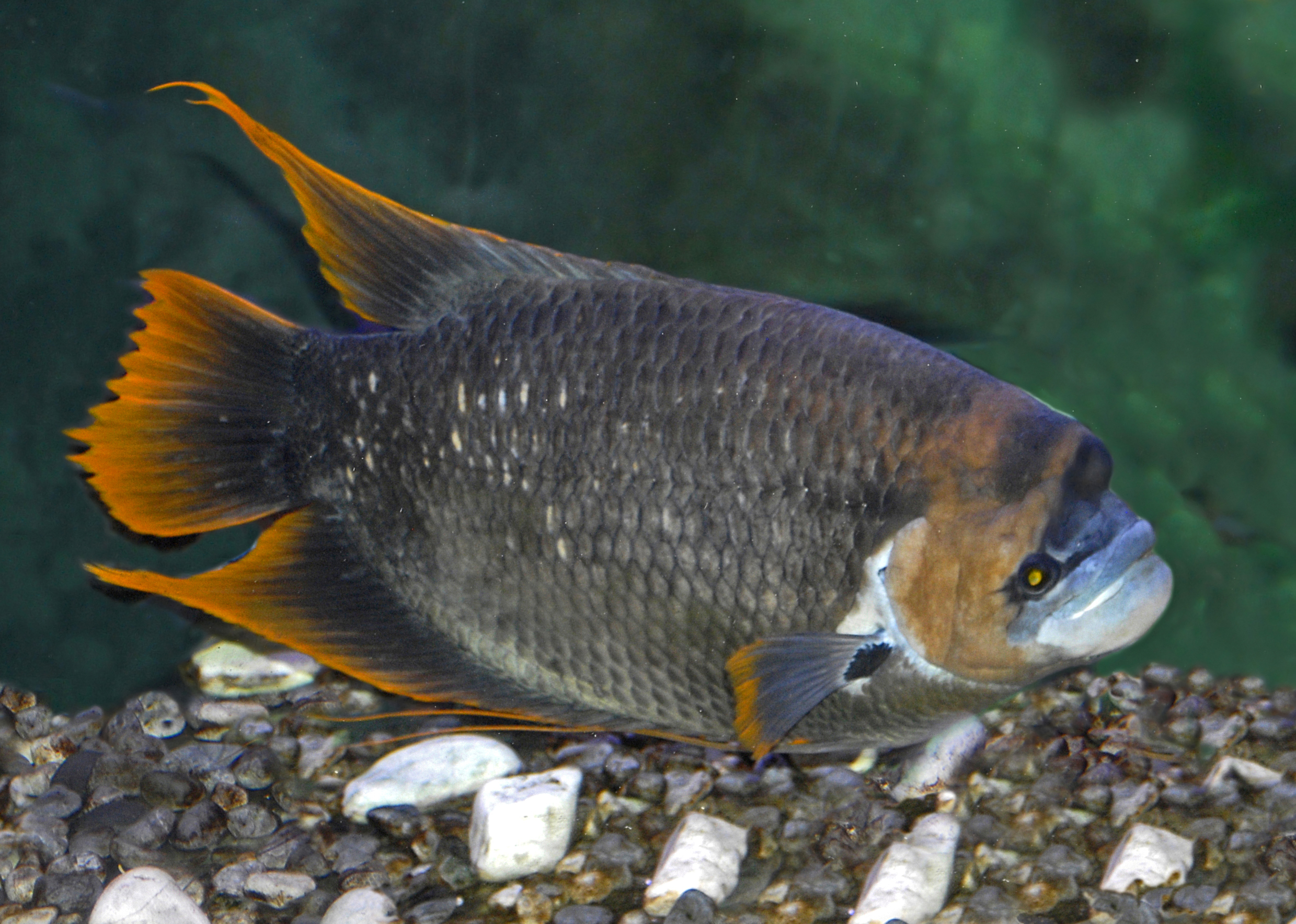

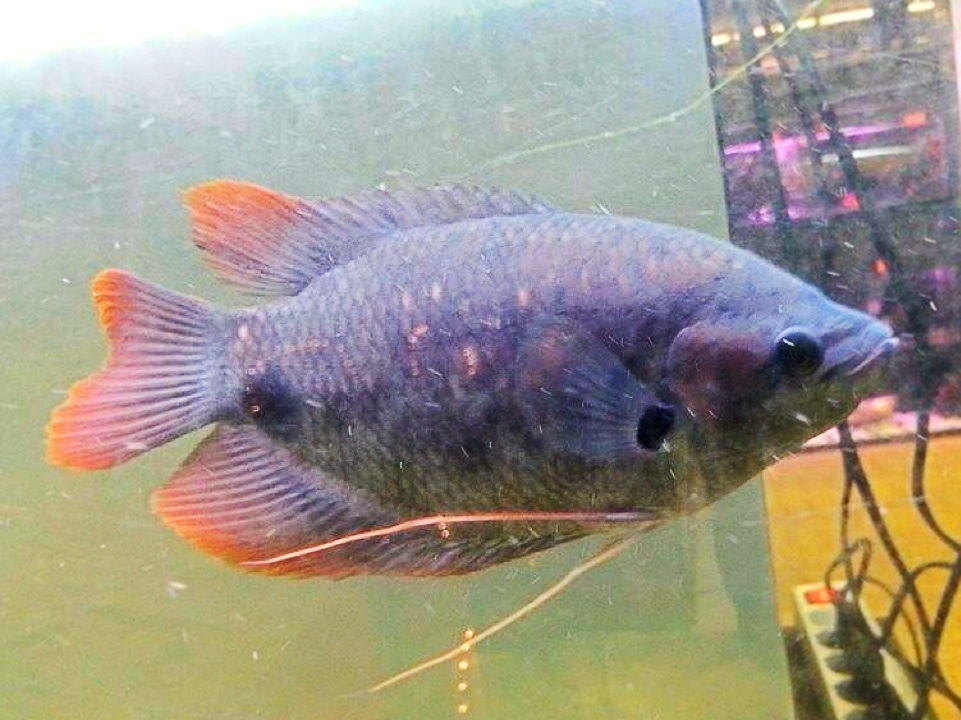
- Adult above, juvenile below

Conservation status
- Endangered (IUCN 3.1)

Scientific classification
- Kingdom: Animalia
- Phylum: Chordata
- Class: Actinopterygii
- Division: Teleostei
- Order: Anabantiformes
- Family: Osphronemidae
- Genus: Osphronemus
- Species: O. laticlavius

Binomial name
- Osphronemus laticlavius T. R. Roberts, 1992
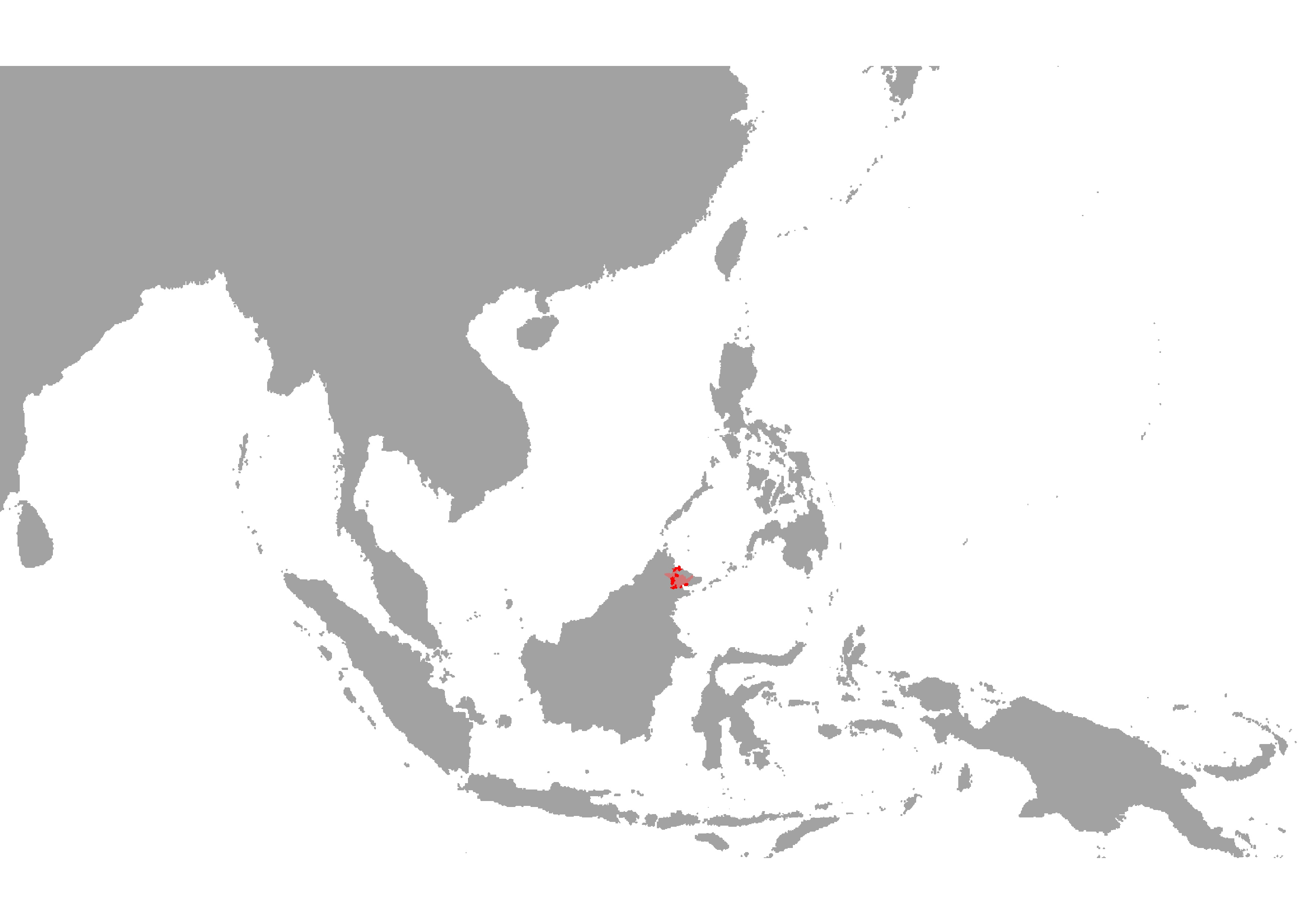
- Red:extant, Light red: possibly extant

= Giant red tail gourami =

Species of fish

The giant red tail gourami (Osphronemus laticlavius) is a large species of gourami belonging to the family Osphronemidae. This endangered fish is native to the Southeast Asian island of Borneo, where only known from the Kinabatangan and Segama river basins in Sabah, East Malaysia. First described in 1992 based on an aquarium specimen, its exact range was not entirely certain, leading some source to incorrectly also report it from Indonesia.

The giant red tail gourami is not common; in a study of the Segama River that covered eight years only a few were caught, and it may already have disappeared from the lower Kinabatangan River. It is replaced in Brunei, Sarawak, and North, East and West Kalimantan by the closely related O. septemfasciatus (this species may also occur in Sabah, but that is unconfirmed). The common giant gourami (O. goramy) occurs at least in Sarawak and West Kalimantan, but this species is possibly not native to Borneo, instead being introduced.

== Description ==
Adults of Osphronemus laticlavius can grow up to 50 centimetres (20 in). These fishes have 10 dorsal spines, 13–14 dorsal soft rays, 11–12 anal spines and 16 – 18 anal soft rays. Body is massive, laterally compressed, with an almost oval shape. The head is snub-nosed, with prominent jaw. The pectoral fins are large and rounded, while the dorsal and anal fins are slightly elongated. Even the tail is rounded and the ventral fins are threadlike. At the root of the pectoral fins appears a black ocellus. Another larger black ocellus appears on the caudal peduncle. Adults have bright red fin edges with filamentous extensions. Body colour varies from gray-blue to gray-green to brown, darker on the back. Females have duller colors. Like other species of the genus Osphronemus, juveniles and adults are quite different, as in juveniles the colors are less dramatic and the bright red fins develops only with age.
