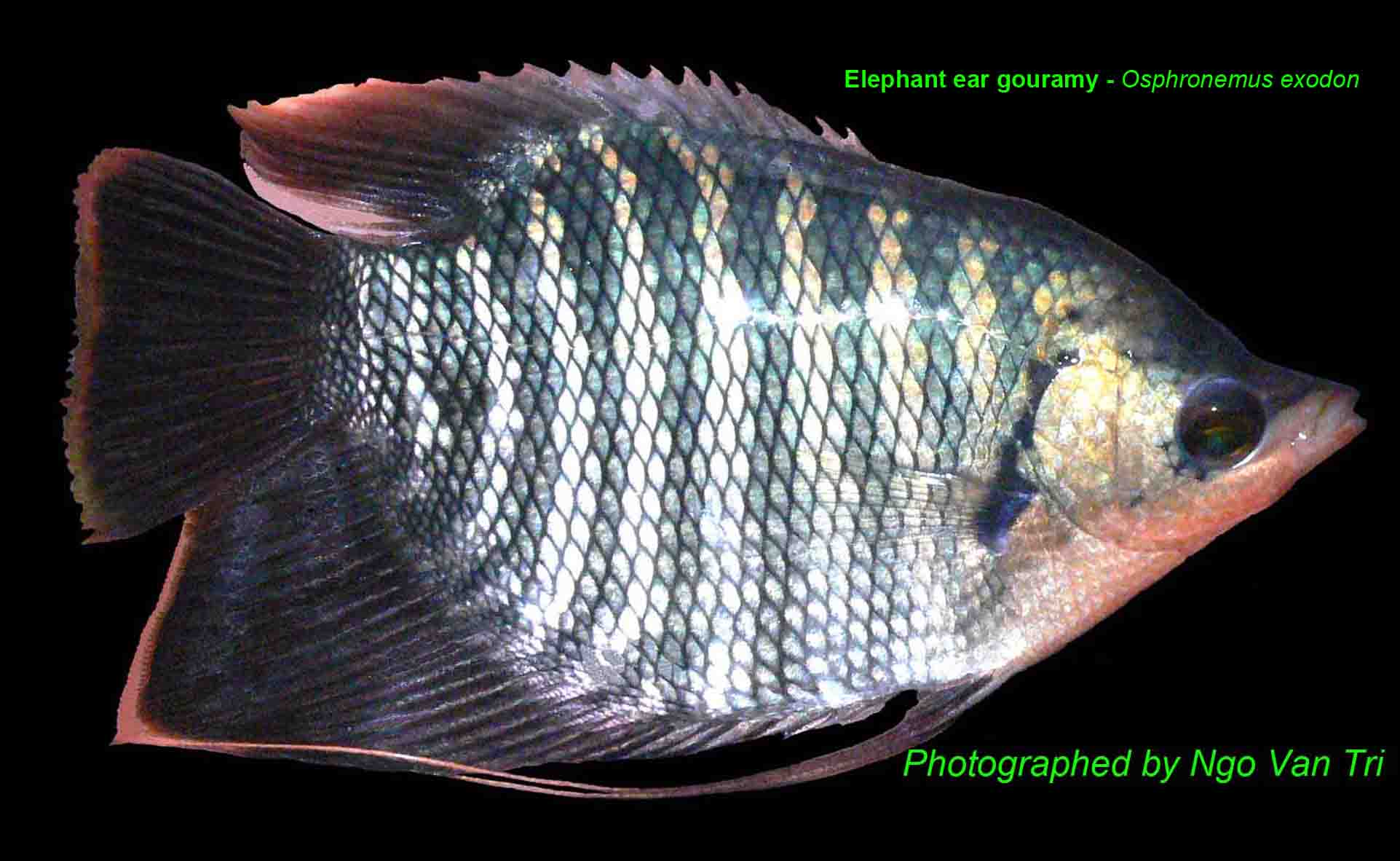
- immature

Conservation status
- Vulnerable (IUCN 3.1)

Scientific classification
- Kingdom: Animalia
- Phylum: Chordata
- Class: Actinopterygii
- Order: Anabantiformes
- Family: Osphronemidae
- Genus: Osphronemus
- Species: O. exodon

Binomial name
- Osphronemus exodon T. R. Roberts, 1994
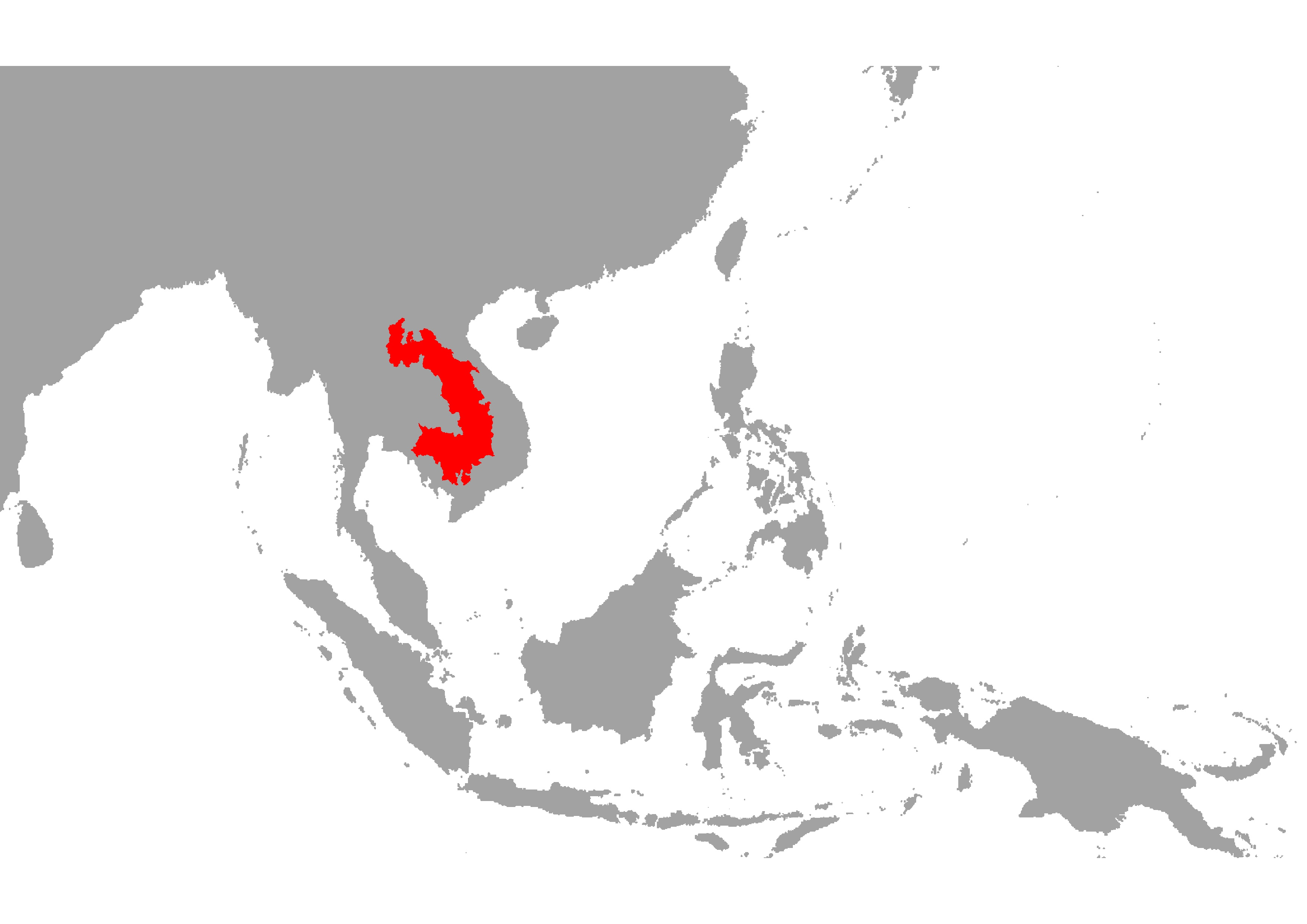

= Elephant ear gourami =

Species of fish

The elephant ear gourami (Osphronemus exodon) is a large species of gourami native to the Mekong river basin in Thailand, Laos, and Cambodia and Vietnam.

== Distribution and habitat ==
In the wild, the elephant ear gourami is found in the Mekong river basin of Thailand, Laos, and Cambodia. It is only known for certain from the middle part of the basin, from Kampong Cham Province (central Cambodia) to Sainyabuli Province (northern Laos). The closely related giant gourami (O. goramy) has been reported from the same section, but these records are likely misidentifications of elephant ear gouramis. In contrast, reports of elephant ear gouramis from the Mekong Delta are possibly misidentifications of giant gouramis. The only section of the Mekong basin where the giant gourami likely occurs naturally are in the southernmost part, like tributaries originating in the northern Cardamom Mountains.

During the wet season, elephant ear gouramis are found in flooded forests and floodplains. During the dry season, they are found in permanent bodies of water, like the Mekong mainstream. Their seasonal movements are triggered by water levels.

== Description ==
Adults can grow up to 60 centimetres (24 in). Like other species of the genus Osphronemus, juveniles and adults of this species have physical differences. Juveniles have 6 or 7 vertical stripes and a spot on the back, which fades as they get older. A red orange stripe appears around the bottom of the head when a juvenile grows up to about around 10 centimetres (3.9 in). Adults are pale on its fins and blackish on its body.

== Conservation ==
Elephant ear gouramis are listed as vulnerable by the IUCN. Dams in the Mekong disrupted the wet and dry season cycle which lowered the population of this species.

== Reproduction ==
Adults reproduce in non flowing waters. They build nests with leaves and roots then one parent guards the nest.
