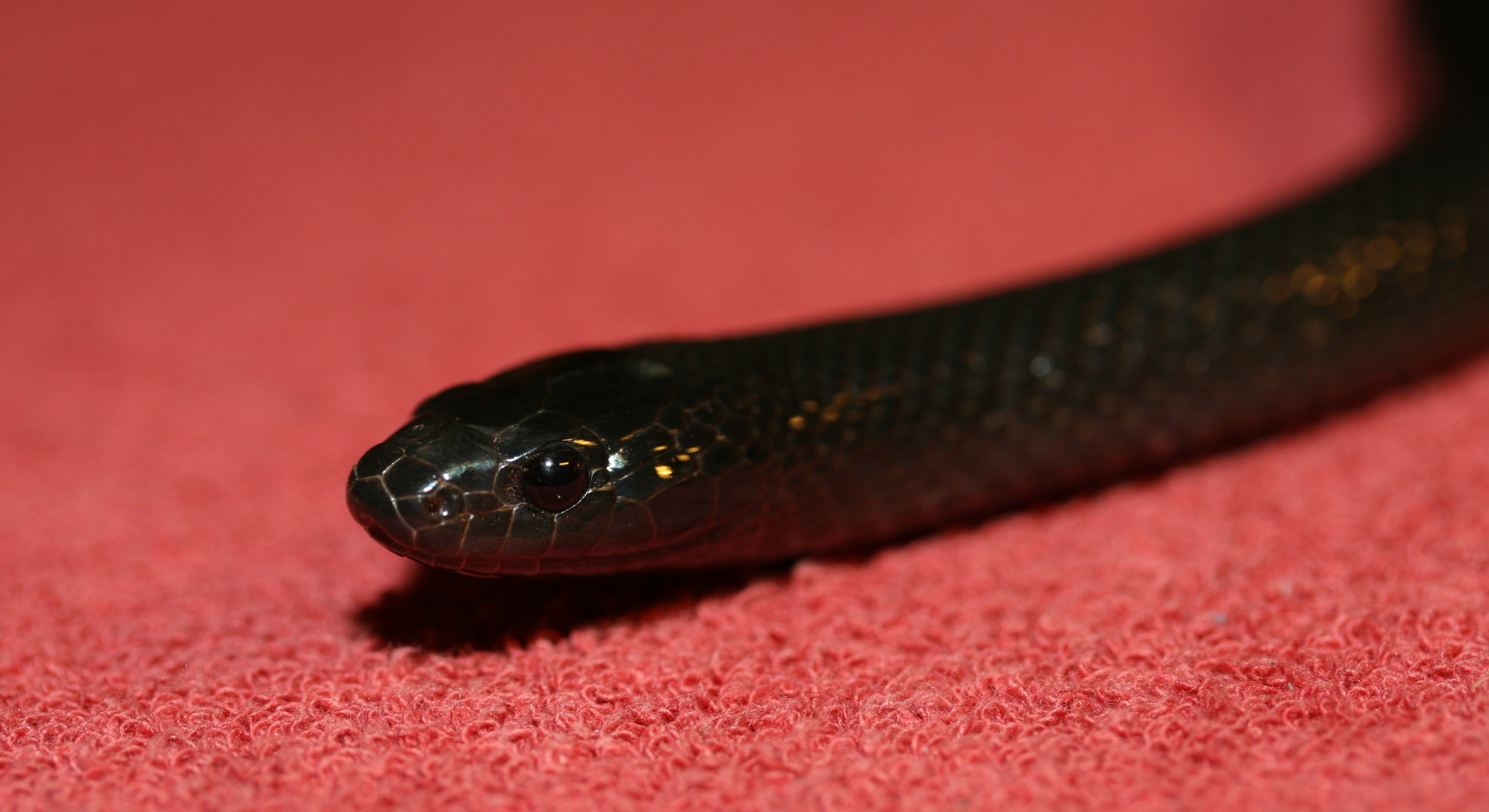
- Lampropeltis mexicana thayeri in the melanistic phase

Scientific classification
- Kingdom: Animalia
- Phylum: Chordata
- Class: Reptilia
- Order: Squamata
- Suborder: Serpentes
- Family: Colubridae
- Genus: Lampropeltis
- Species: L. mexicana
- Subspecies: L. m. thayeri

Trinomial name
- Lampropeltis mexicana thayeri Loveridge, 1924

= Lampropeltis mexicana thayeri =

Subspecies of snake

Lampropeltis mexicana thayeri, currently known as lampropeltis leonis, or Nuevo León kingsnake, variable kingsnake, or Thayer's kingsnake, is a nonvenomous snake belonging to the family Colubridae. Thayer's kingsnake is a subspecies of the mexicana group of the genus Lampropeltis. Thayer's kingsnake is endemic to the eastern slopes of the Mexican plateaus in Tamaulipas, Mexico. Thayer's kingsnake is known for producing offspring typically displaying three (Note: The fourth phase, "melanistic" or "black", is uncommon but may appear in a clutch.) main variable phases within the same clutch from similar-coloured patterned parents.

== Appearance ==
The dorsal body scales of Thayer's kingsnake are primarily either red and black or solid black although their scale color patterns are highly variable.

== Range ==
Thayer's kingsnake is found on the eastern slopes of the Mexican plateaus in Tamaulipas, Mexico.

== Behavior ==
The behaviour of Thayer's kingsnake is similar to many of the other kingsnake species. Thayer's kingsnake is typically non-aggressive and reclusive and does well in captivity. Thayer's kingsnake requires a hiding place at all times and often prefers to hide in such.

== Diet ==
Thayer's kingsnake kills its prey by constriction and prefers a diet of lizards in the wild although they have been known to feed on rodents, frogs and other snakes. In captivity, Thayer's kingsnakes can be weaned onto rodents as their main food source.

== Reproduction ==
Thayer's kingsnakes are oviparous typically laying between six–14 eggs up to twice per year. Like many other colubrids, Thayer's kingsnakes usually mate in early spring following a winter cooling period.
