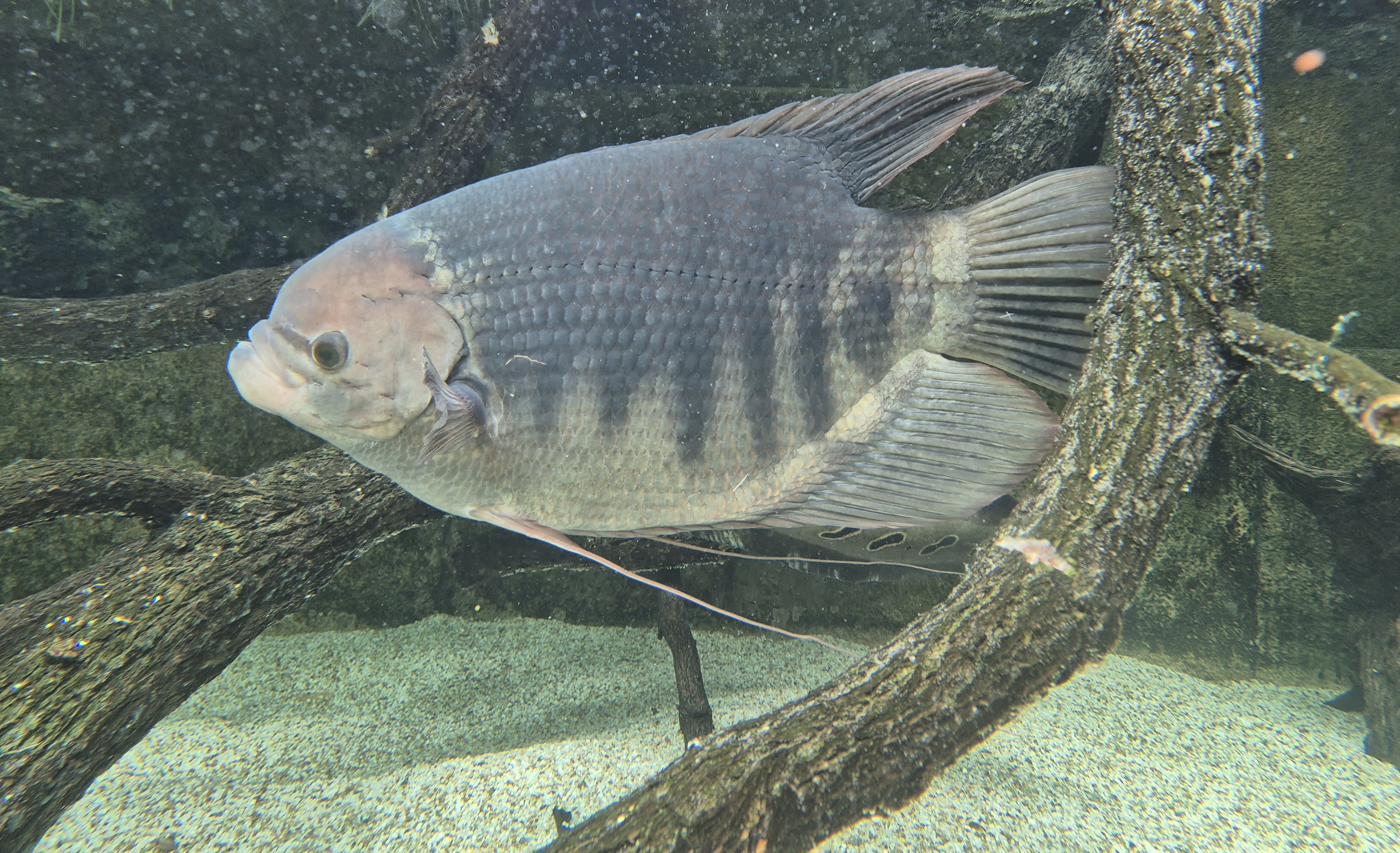

Conservation status
- Least Concern (IUCN 3.1)

Scientific classification
- Kingdom: Animalia
- Phylum: Chordata
- Class: Actinopterygii
- Order: Anabantiformes
- Family: Osphronemidae
- Genus: Osphronemus
- Species: O. septemfasciatus

Binomial name
- Osphronemus septemfasciatus T. R. Roberts, 1992
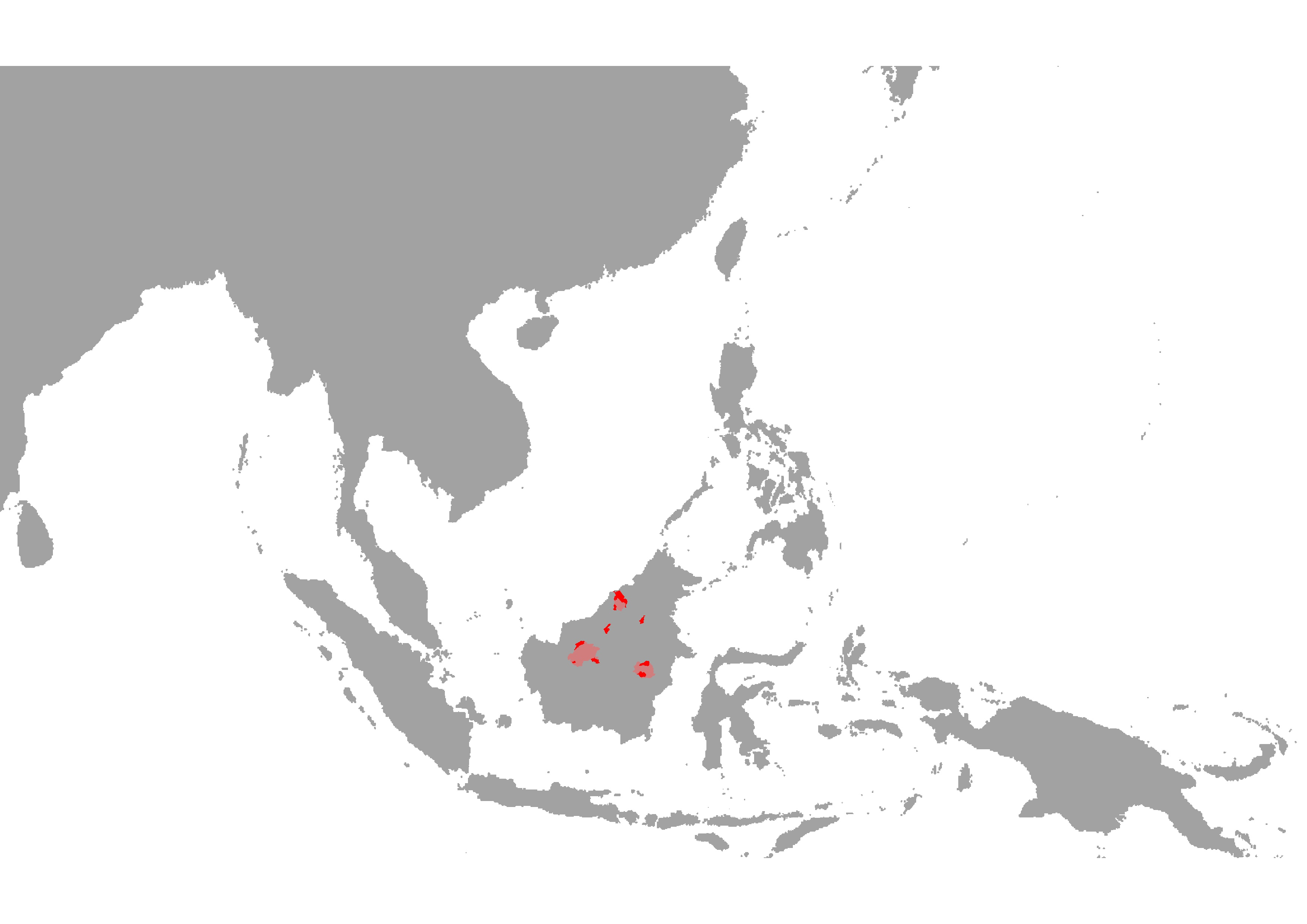
- Red:extant, light red: possibly extant

= Osphronemus septemfasciatus =

Species of fish

Osphronemus septemfasciatus is a species of giant gourami, a type of Southeast Asian freshwater fish from the family Osphronemidae. It is endemic to the island of Borneo where it is found in the Malaysian state of Sarawak, in Brunei, and the Indonesian provinces of West Kalimantan, East Kalimantan and North Kalimantan. It is found in large slow-flowing rivers where it prefers the main channels, although juveniles also occur in large tributaries near the main river. Like its relatives, it is known to be an obligate air-breather. The largest recorded specimen of O. septemfasciatus, which possibly also is the largest giant gourami, was caught in Sarawak and it was 72.4 cm (28.5 in) in standard length, 87.2 cm (34.3 in) in total length and 20.5 kg (45 lb) in weight.
