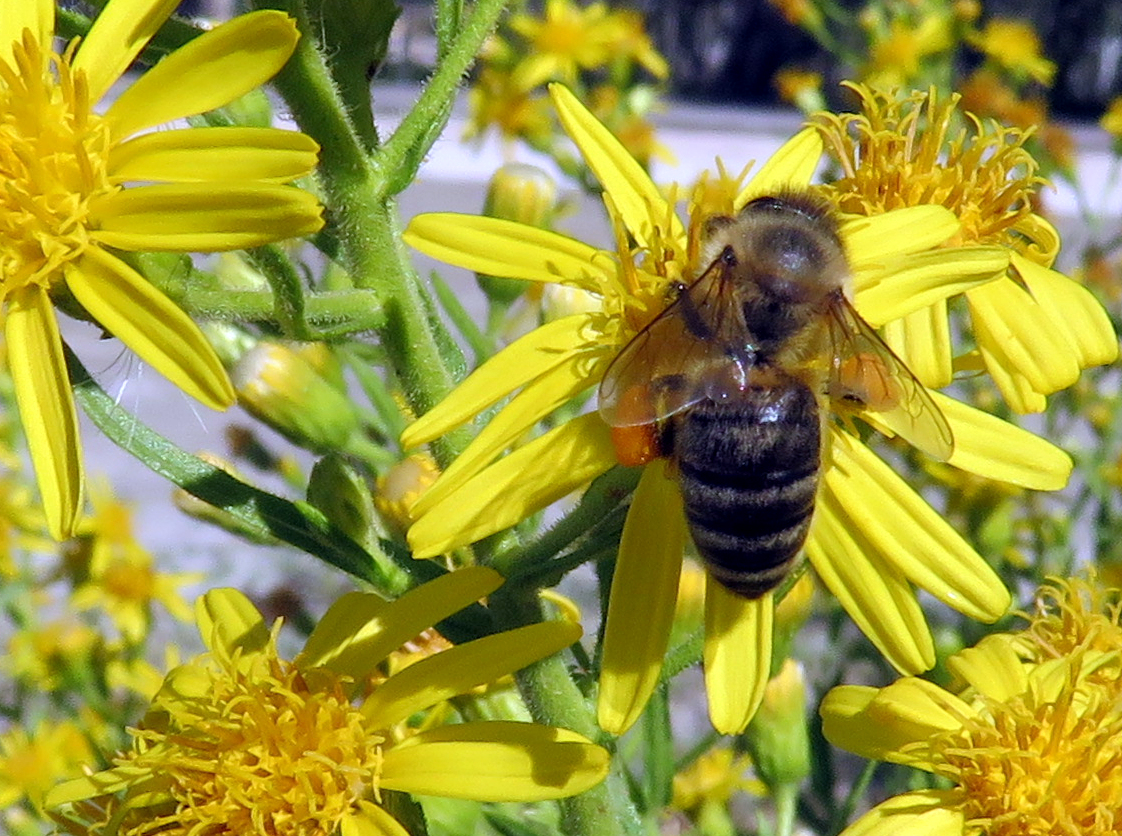

Scientific classification
- Kingdom: Animalia
- Phylum: Arthropoda
- Class: Insecta
- Order: Hymenoptera
- Family: Apidae
- Genus: Apis
- Species: A. mellifera
- Subspecies: A. m. cecropia

Trinomial name
- Apis mellifera cecropia Kiesenwetter, 1860

= Apis mellifera cecropia =

Subspecies of honey bee

Apis mellifera cecropia, the Greek bee, is a subspecies of honey bee that is native to southern Greece and southern Albania. It is very similar to Apis mellifera ligustica, or the Italian bee. It is favored for its extreme gentleness and lack of tendency to swarm. This species prefers warm temperatures, owing to its Mediterranean origin, and cannot survive in northern Europe's cooler climate. Due to that, they are seldom kept outside of southern Greece.

== Life cycle ==
Greek bees generally tend to build up very quickly in the spring, with the queens being very prolific, resulting in strong hives. They also tend to make quite a lot of honey, but only in Mediterranean climates.
