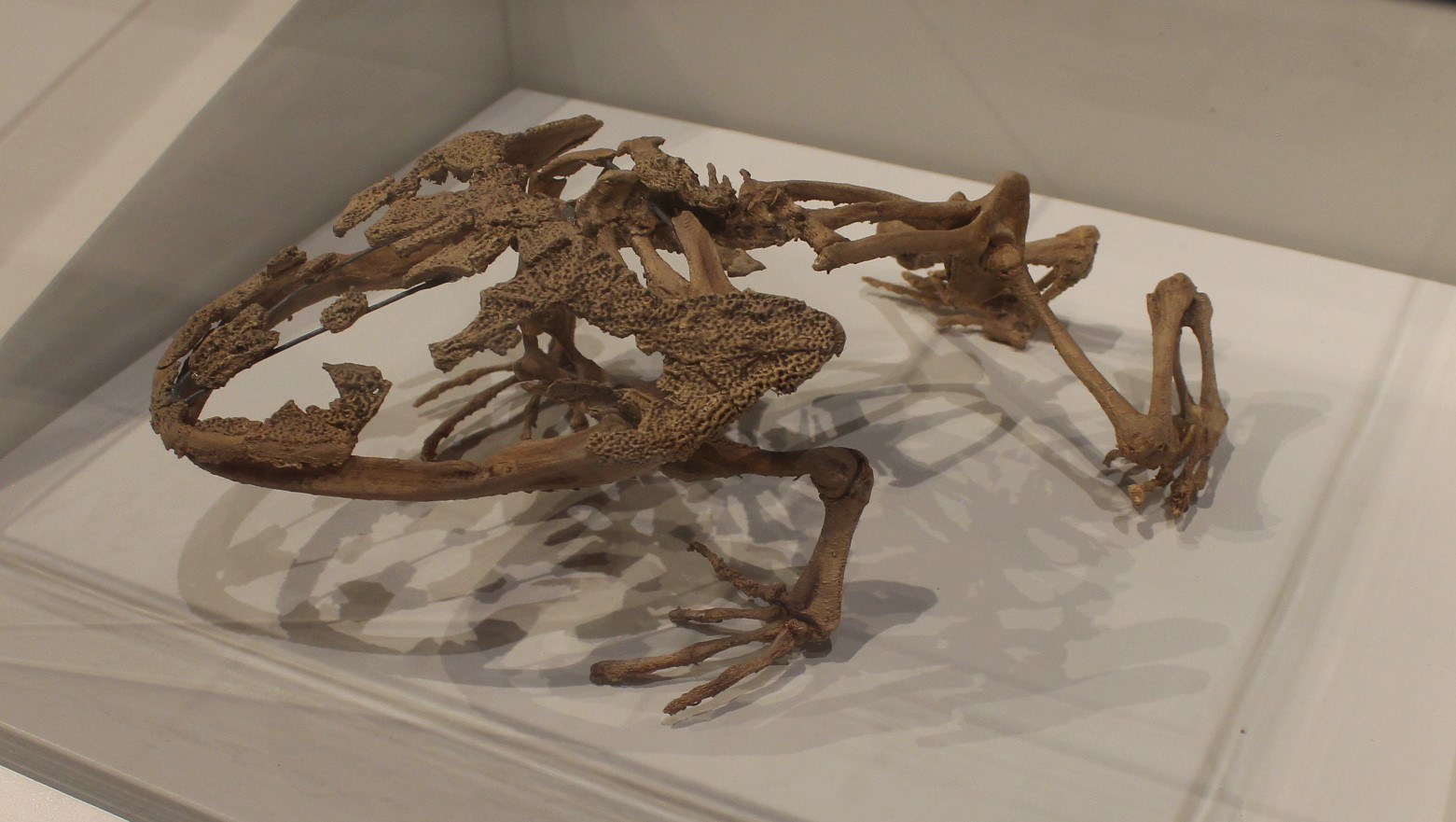
- Skeleton cast, University of Michigan Museum of Natural History

Scientific classification
- Kingdom: Animalia
- Phylum: Chordata
- Class: Amphibia
- Order: Anura
- Superfamily: Hyloidea
- Genus: †Beelzebufo; Evans, Jones, & Krause, 2008

Type species
- †Beelzebufo ampinga Evans, Jones, & Krause, 2008

= Beelzebufo =

Beelzebufo Temporal range: Late Cretaceous, 70 Ma

Extinct genus of amphibians

Beelzebufo (/biːˌɛlzɪˈbjuːfoʊ/ or /ˌbiːlzəˈbjuːfoʊ/) (meaning "devil toad") is an extinct genus of hyloid frog from the Late Cretaceous Berivotra and Maevarano Formations, approximately 70 million years ago in what is now Madagascar. The type species is B. ampinga, and common names assigned by the popular media to it include devil frog, devil toad, and the frog from hell.

== Discovery and naming ==
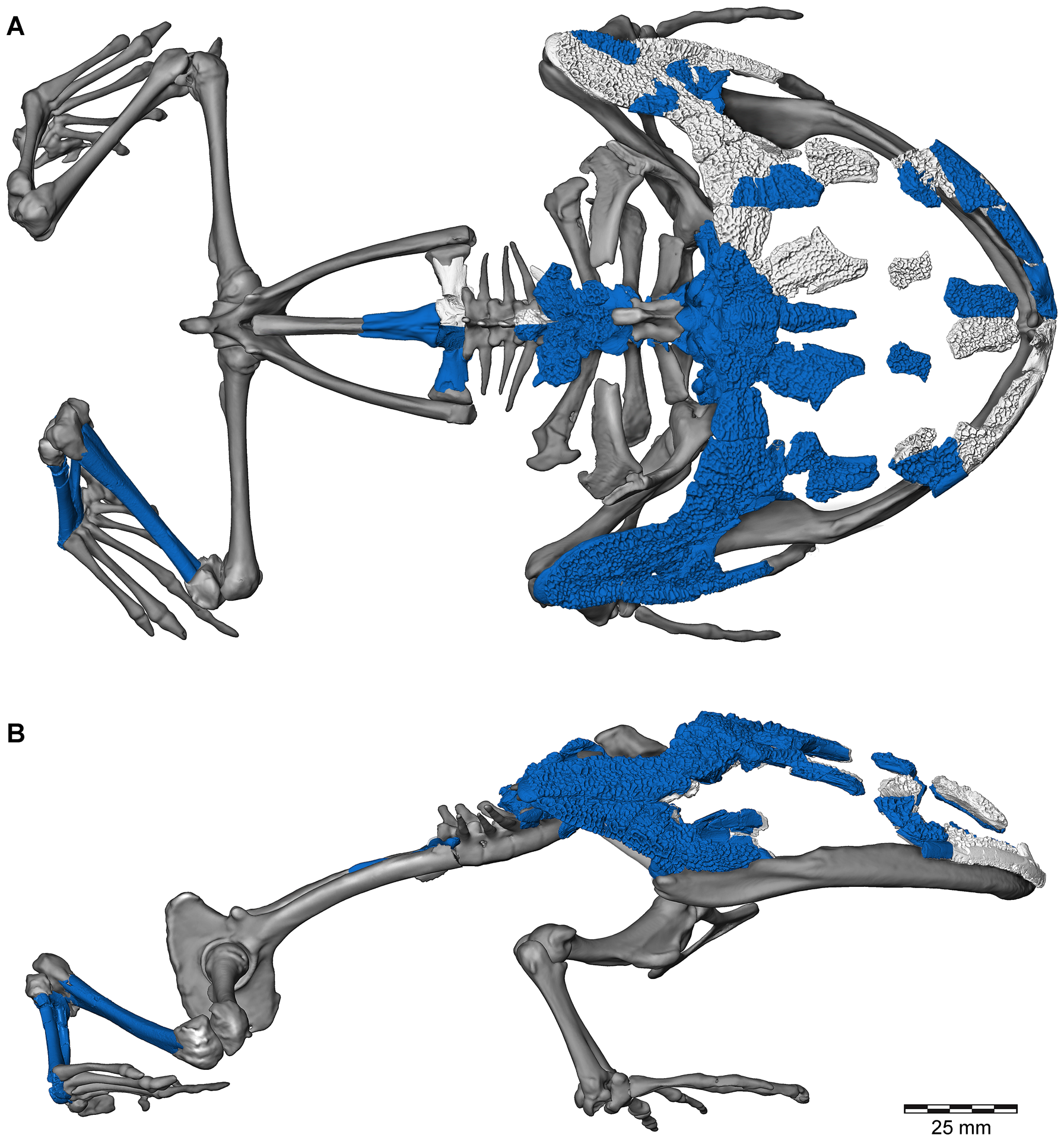
Three-dimensional digital reconstruction, with blue and light gray representing known fossils

The first fossil bones were found in 1993 by David W. Krause of New York's Stony Brook University, and the species Beelzebufo ampinga was named and described by Evans, Jones & Krause (2008). The holotype is specimen UA 9600, consisting of a fused cervical and second presacral centra.

These specimens were then described in more detail by Evans, Jones, and Krause (2014).

Some 100 fossil isolated partial bones have been found between 1993 and 2011. Some portions of articulated skull are also known: specimen FMNH PR 2512 (a specimen discovered in 2010 which preserves most of the braincase, part of the palate, part of the skull roof and several pre-sacral vertebrae) and specimen FMNH PR 2512 (which preserves one of the posterior flanges). Researchers have been able to reconstruct parts of the frog's skeleton, including nearly the entire skull.

== Description ==
Size estimation of Beelzebufo

In early studies, it is suggested that Beelzebufo had snout-vent lengths of up to 42.5 cm (16.7 in). However in later studies, animals of this species are estimated to have grown to at least 23.2 cm (9.1 in) in snout-vent length, which is around the size a modern African bullfrog can reach. The head of Beelzebufo was very big, and bones of the skull roof show a rugous external surface, indicating at least parts of the head may have borne bony scales, called scutes.

The skull sutures are open in even the largest specimens of Beelzebufo, showing that it might have grown even bigger.

== Classification ==
Within the superfamily Hyloidea, the definitive phylogenetic position of Beelzebufo is uncertain. Although phylogenetic analyses suggested a close relationship between Beelzebufo and Ceratophryidae, the possibility of convergent evolution was explicitly acknowledged. These initial results reignited interest and research into skeletal variation among living members of the Ceratophyridae. A 2018 study suggested that Beelzebufo, and other extinct frogs with ceratophryid-like traits such as Baurubatrachus, were instead part of a more ancient group of Neobatrachia, distantly related to horned frogs. A 2022 study recovered Baurubatrachus and Beelzebufo as sister genera, with the clade formed by the two genera in turn being the sister clade to extant Ceratophyridae. A 2023 phylogenetic study instead recovered Beelzebufo as a sister taxon of the hylid Ranoidea australis.

== Paleobiology ==
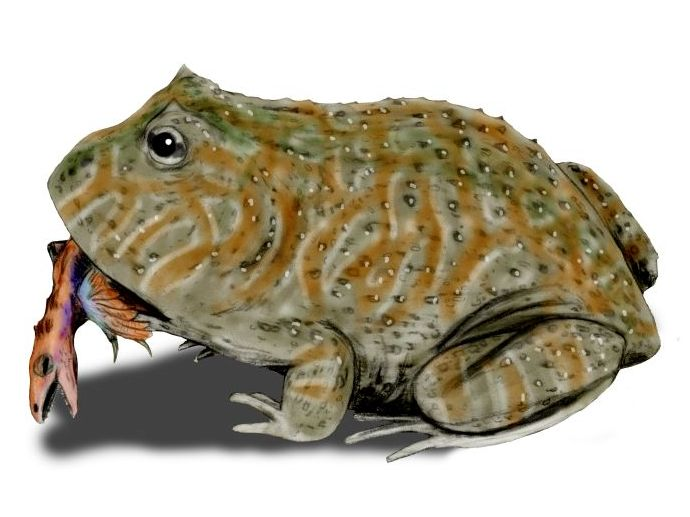
Life restoration of Beelzebufo as a ceratophryid, eating a hatchling avian theropod

Beelzebufo most likely was a predator whose expansive mouth allowed it to eat relatively large prey, perhaps even juvenile dinosaurs. It may have also eaten insects, lizards and small/juvenile crocodylomorphs. Bite force measurements from a growth series of Cranwell's horned frog (Ceratophrys cranwelli), suggest that the bite force of a large Beelzebufo—skull width 15.4 cm (6.1 in), with mouth width reaching 15.4 cm, taking up 100% of the width of the skull—may have been between 500 and 2,200 newtons (110 and 490 lb_{f}). This measurement exceeds the Cranwell's horned frog's biteforce by ~32%.

== Paleobiogeography ==
The fossils of Beelzebufo are from Madagascar, which, while still attached to India, separated from the coast of Somalia in the earliest stage of the Late Jurassic. While its definitive taxonomic placement is uncertain, Beelzebufo has been suggested to resemble horned frogs (Ceratophryidae) of South America, which raised the possibility of a close biogeographic link between Madagascar and South America during the Cretaceous.. Other studies have argued that the similarities between Beelzebufo and horned frogs may have evolved by convergence.
