= Frogs in captivity =

Rana catesbeiana and Bufo gargarizans being housed together.

Frogs have recently become very popular exotic pets as they are generally undemanding and often visually appealing. Many frogs, especially common ones, can be inexpensive, but some specimens can cost several hundreds of dollars. Their food is in most cases easily purchased. Commonly kept pet frogs include ranids, hylids, bufonids, leptodactylids, and dendrobatids.

== Feeding ==
Pet frogs can be fed a wide variety of live foods, from pinhead crickets to mice and rats, depending on the size of the frog. Particularly small pet frogs, like those of Dendrobates and Phyllobates species, will generally feed on small crickets, fruit flies, springtails, and other small arthropods. Medium-sized pet frogs can be fed larger crickets, mealworms, butterworms, silkworms, grasshoppers, and even small fish. Large pet frogs, like those in the genus Ceratophrys can be fed small fish, other frogs, reptiles, and small mammals such as mice or rats.

== Housing ==
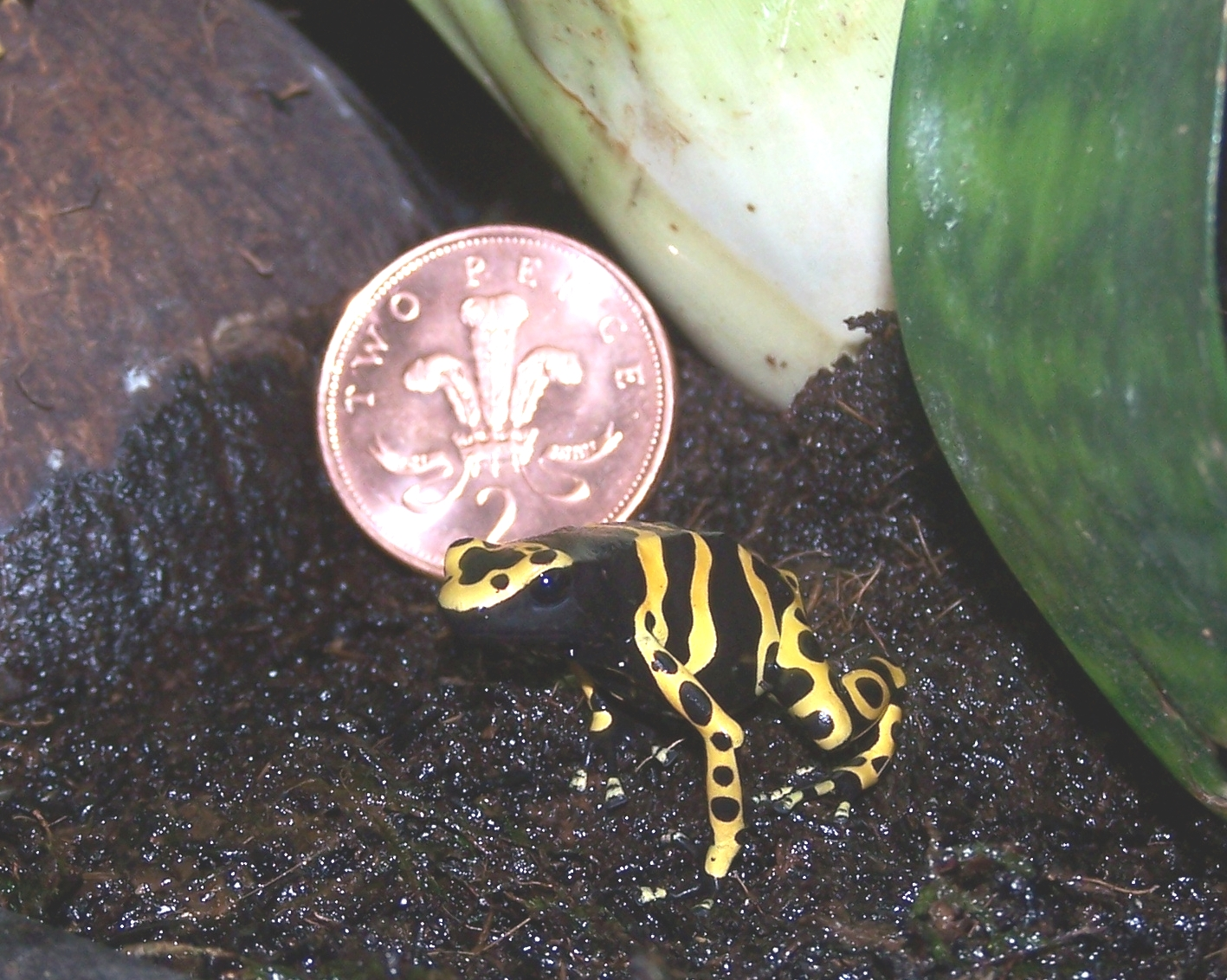
A captive poison dart frog (Dendrobates leucomelas) in its habitat with a UK 2p coin for scale.

Depending on the size and nature of the frog, the size of terrariums in which they can be kept varies widely. Small or sluggish frogs can be kept in 60 x 30 x 30 cm terrariums; the highly active dendrobatids are an exception as they like to climb; dendrobatids generally need a terrarium of about 1 m x 60 cm x 60 cm.

Large frogs, on the other hand, may need a terrarium measuring 1 m in each direction. Some arboreal frogs, such as dendrobatids, can stick to glass; these frogs require terrariums with sealed tops to prevent escape. Tropical frogs also often require air flow; cages with metal mesh on at least two walls should provide them with enough air flow.

All pet frogs require moisture; this can be provided either with an automatic water sprayer, ultrasonic fog machine, or even manually, by use of a hand-held spray bottle. Frogs that live in the jungle naturally must be misted at least twice per day; frogs native to drier areas do not require as much moisture. Pools of clean water must be provided if such a requirement exists for the type of frog being kept; water with chlorine in it can damage the frogs.

Only bottled water, RO water or DI water should be used in the terrarium/vivarium. However, some species of frogs (notably, many arboreal anura, such as the popular family Dendrobatidae) do not require any standing water pools at all in the terrarium, relying entirely on the moisture within the leaf litter and bromeliads to remain moist. In some cases, dendrobatids could actually drown sexual competitors by sitting on them in water pools. Dendrobatidae engage in intrasexual competitive wrestling, forcefully sitting on sexual competitors.

Great care must be taken in creating a safe habitat, which includes tailoring each terrarium to the specific needs of the family or genus of anura to be kept.

== See also ==
- History of dendrobatid frogkeeping
