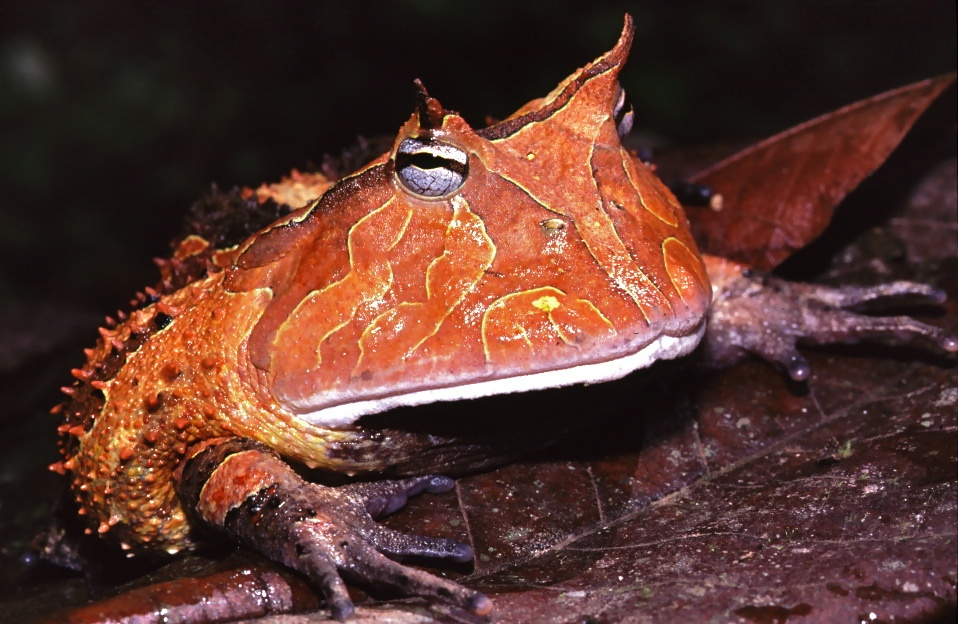

Conservation status
- Least Concern (IUCN 3.1)

Scientific classification
- Kingdom: Animalia
- Phylum: Chordata
- Class: Amphibia
- Order: Anura
- Family: Ceratophryidae
- Genus: Ceratophrys
- Species: C. cornuta

Binomial name
- Ceratophrys cornuta (Linnaeus, 1758)

= Surinam horned frog =

Species of amphibian

The Surinam horned frog (Ceratophrys cornuta), also known as Amazonian horned frog, is a bulky frog measuring up to 20 centimetres (7.9 in) found in the northern part of South America. It has an exceptionally wide mouth, and has horn-like projections above its eyes. Females lay up to 1,000 eggs at a time, and wrap them around aquatic plants. The frog eats other frogs, fish, lizards, and mice. Tadpoles of the Surinam horned frog attack each other (and tadpoles from other species) soon after being hatched. This species was once considered the same species as Ceratophrys ornata. This dispute was later settled because the Surinam Horned frog inhabits a different habitat than its smaller cousin and does not interbreed with it in the wild (but will do so in captivity). This species has been known to prey upon the other species of horned frog, especially the northern race of Ceratophrys ornata.

== Gallery ==
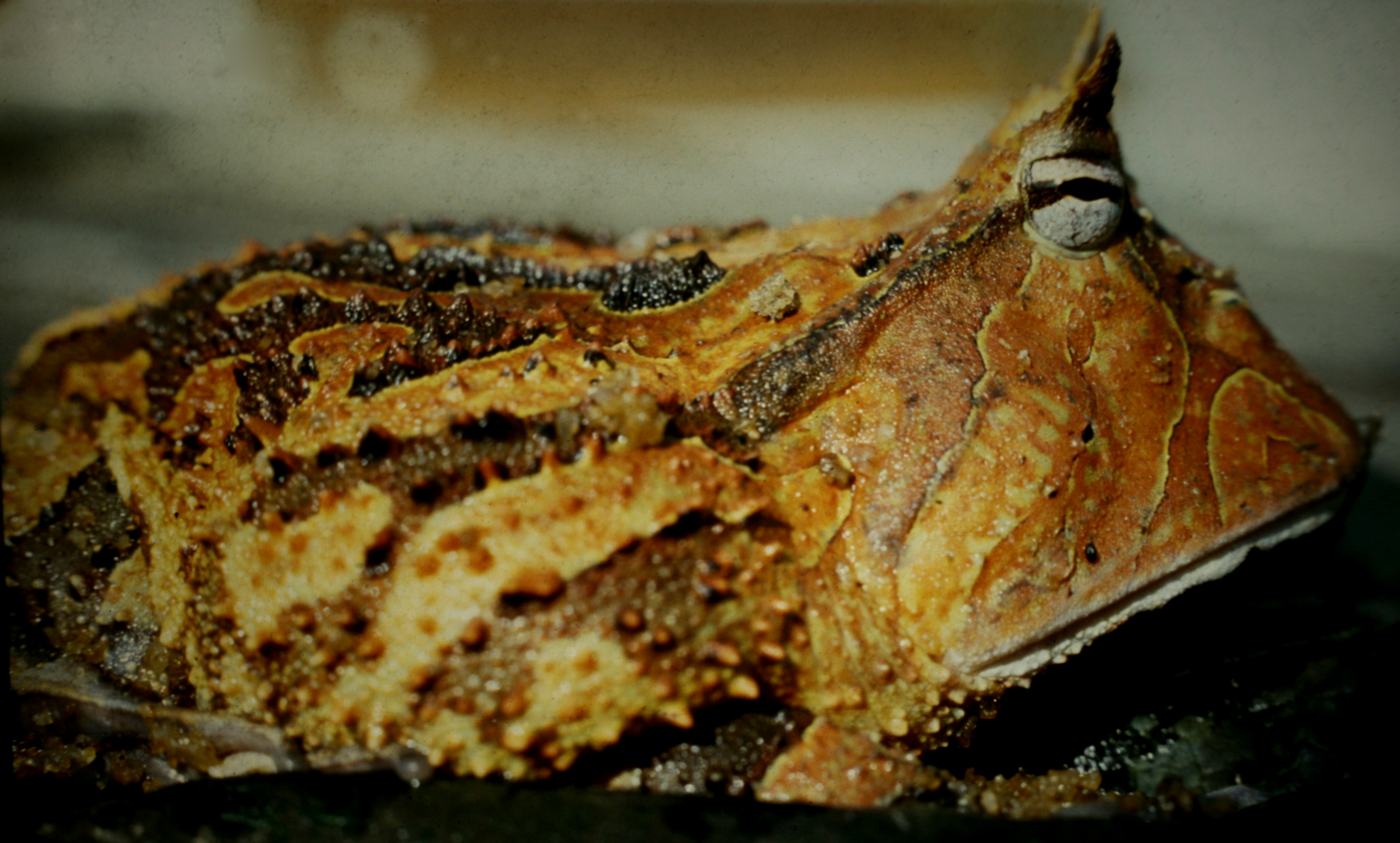
Ceratophrys cornuta
Suriname

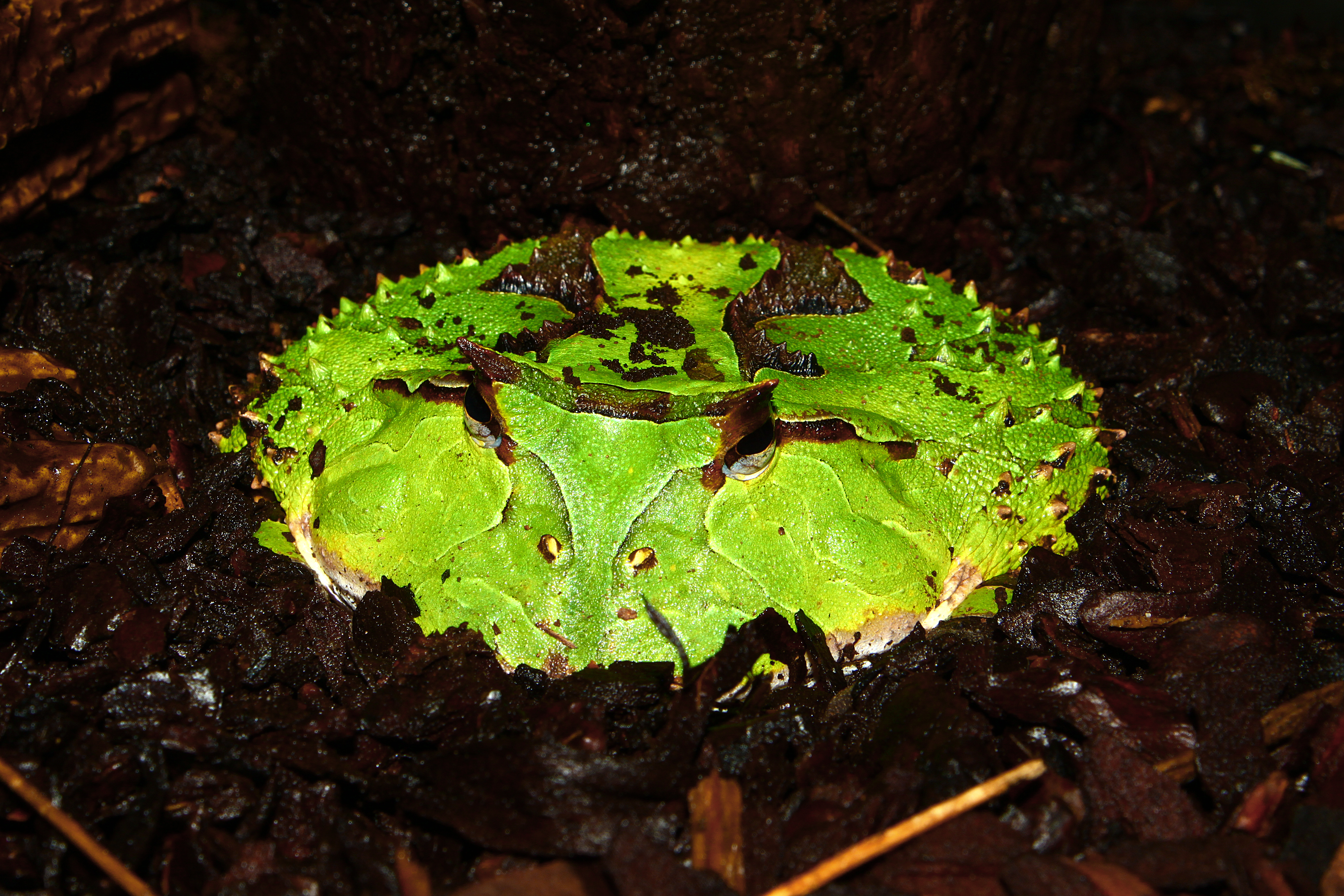
Burying behaviour

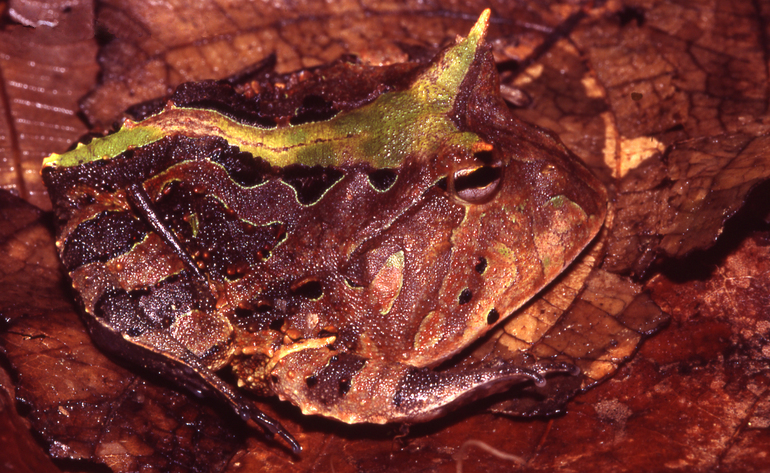

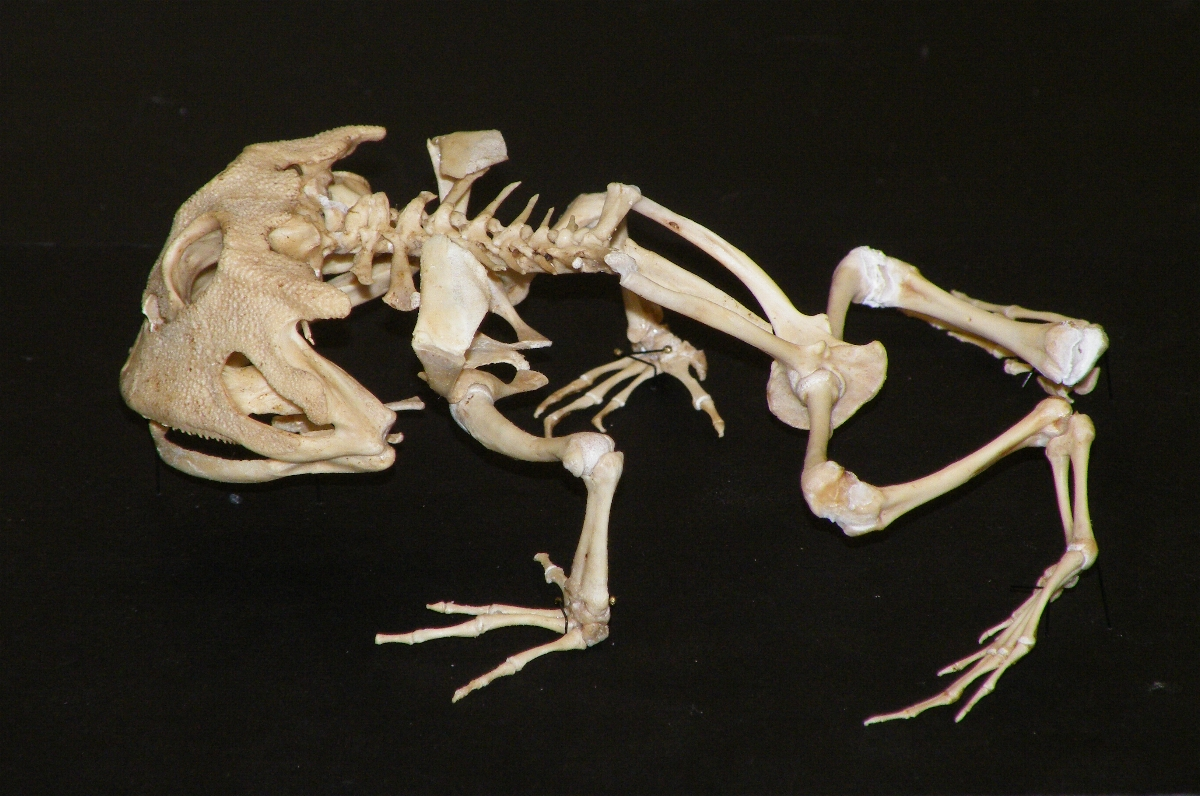
Ceratophrys cornuta
skeleton

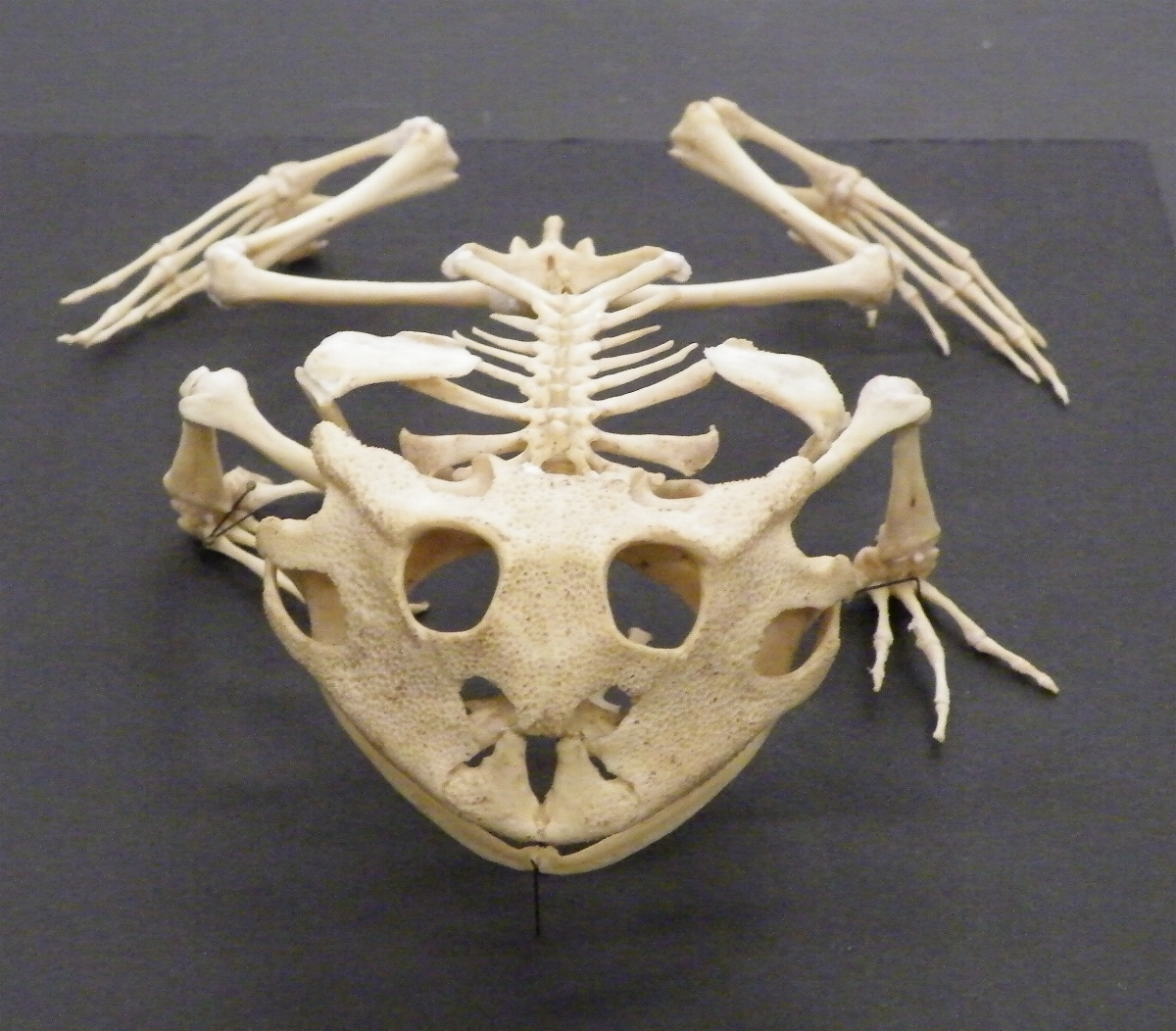
Ceratophrys cornuta
skeleton

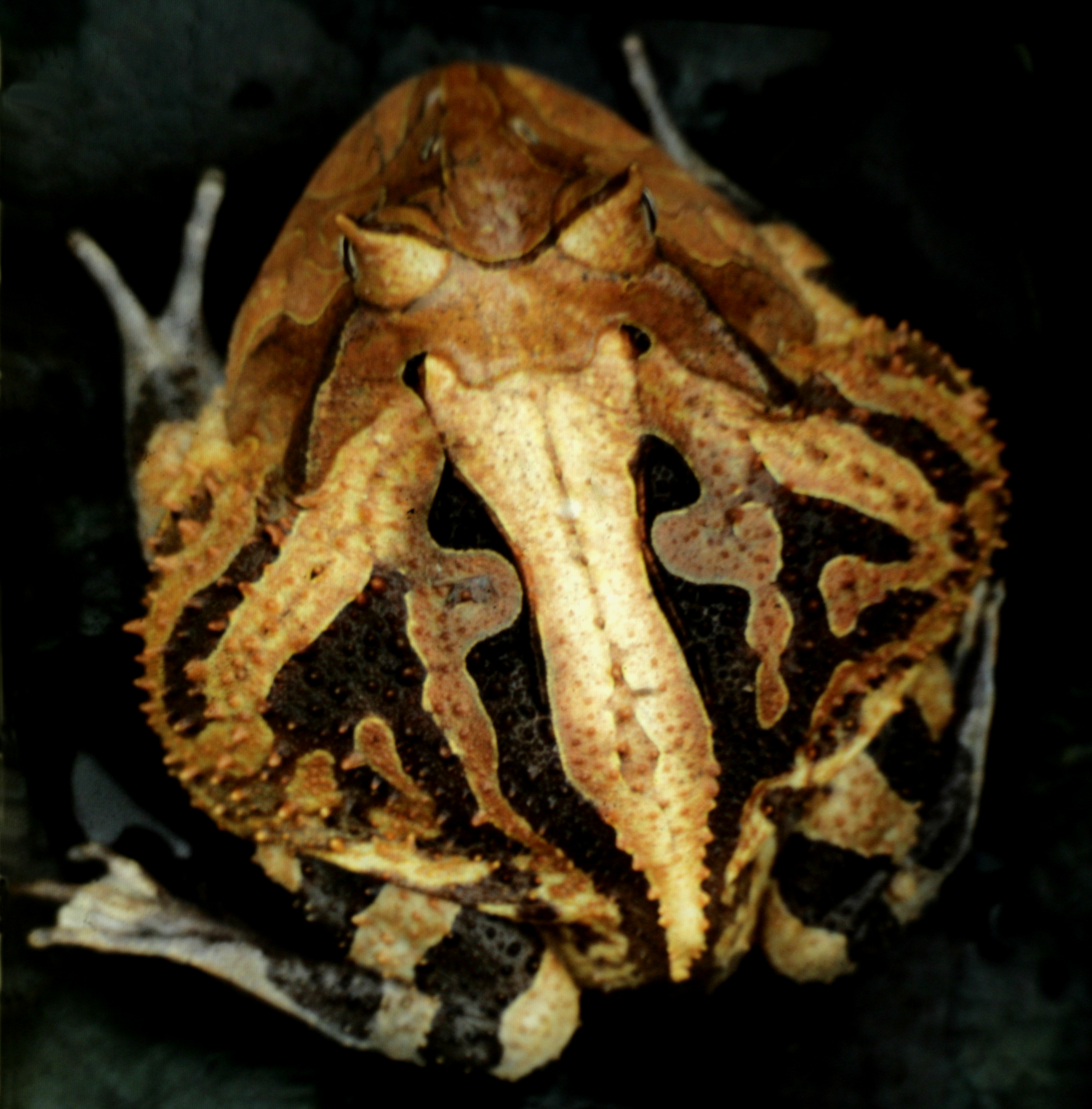
Ceratophrys cornuta
Suriname

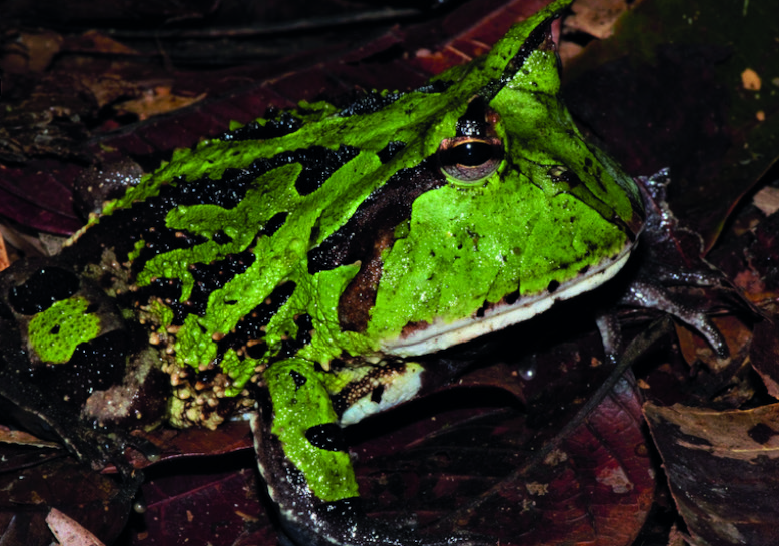
Amapá, Brazil
