= Ecuadorian horned frog =

Conservation status
- Data Deficient (IUCN 3.1)

Scientific classification
- Kingdom: Animalia
- Phylum: Chordata
- Class: Amphibia
- Order: Anura
- Family: Ceratophryidae
- Genus: Ceratophrys
- Species: C. testudo

Binomial name
- Ceratophrys testudo Andersson, 1945

Species of amphibian

The Ecuadorian horned frog (Ceratophrys testudo) is a species of frog in the family Ceratophryidae. It is endemic to Ecuador. Its natural habitats are subtropical or tropical moist montane forest and intermittent freshwater marshes.
