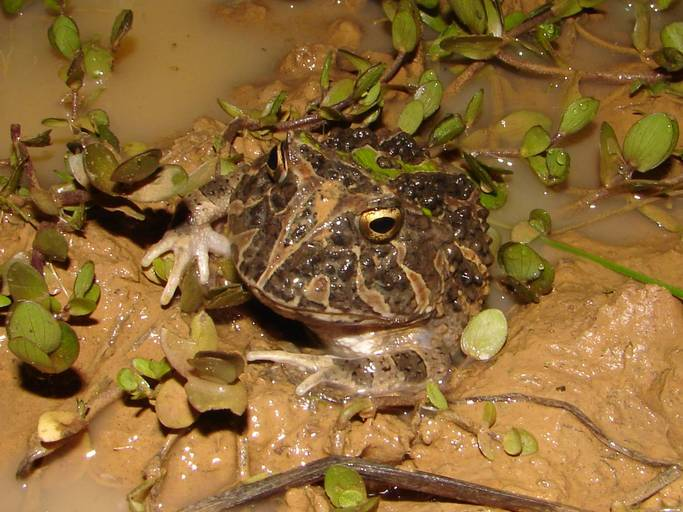

Conservation status
- Least Concern (IUCN 3.1)

Scientific classification
- Kingdom: Animalia
- Phylum: Chordata
- Class: Amphibia
- Order: Anura
- Family: Ceratophryidae
- Genus: Ceratophrys
- Species: C. calcarata

Binomial name
- Ceratophrys calcarata Boulenger, 1890

= Venezuelan horned frog =

Species of amphibian

The Colombian horned frog or Venezuelan horned frog (Ceratophrys calcarata) is a species of frog in the family Ceratophryidae. It is found in Colombia and Venezuela. Its natural habitats are dry savanna, subtropical or tropical dry shrubland, subtropical or tropical dry lowland grassland, and intermittent freshwater marshes.
