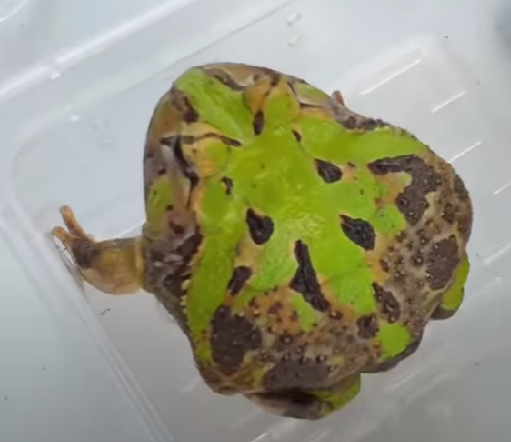

Conservation status
- Least Concern (IUCN 3.1)

Scientific classification
- Kingdom: Animalia
- Phylum: Chordata
- Class: Amphibia
- Order: Anura
- Family: Ceratophryidae
- Genus: Ceratophrys
- Species: C. aurita

Binomial name
- Ceratophrys aurita (Raddi, 1823)

Synonyms
- Ceratophrys dorsata; Ceratophrys varia

= Brazilian horned frog =

Species of amphibian

The Brazilian horned frog (Ceratophrys aurita) is a species of frog in the family Ceratophryidae. It is endemic to Brazil. Its natural habitats are subtropical or tropical moist lowland forest, freshwater marshes, intermittent freshwater marshes, and ponds.

== Lifespan ==
Members of the genus Ceratophrys, which includes the Brazilian horned frog, generally lives between 1 and 6 years in the wild, but can live up to 15 years in captivity.

== Gallery ==
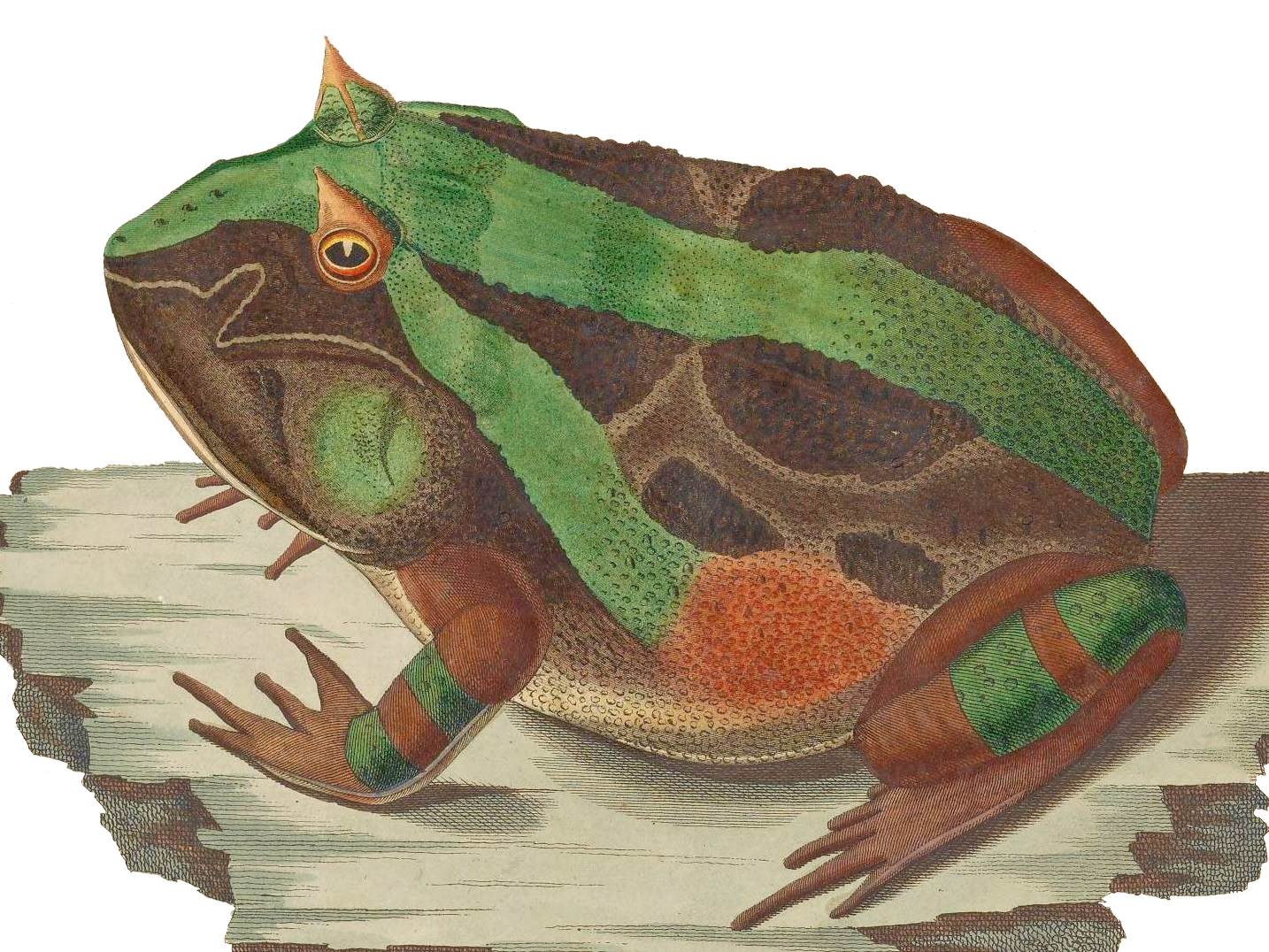

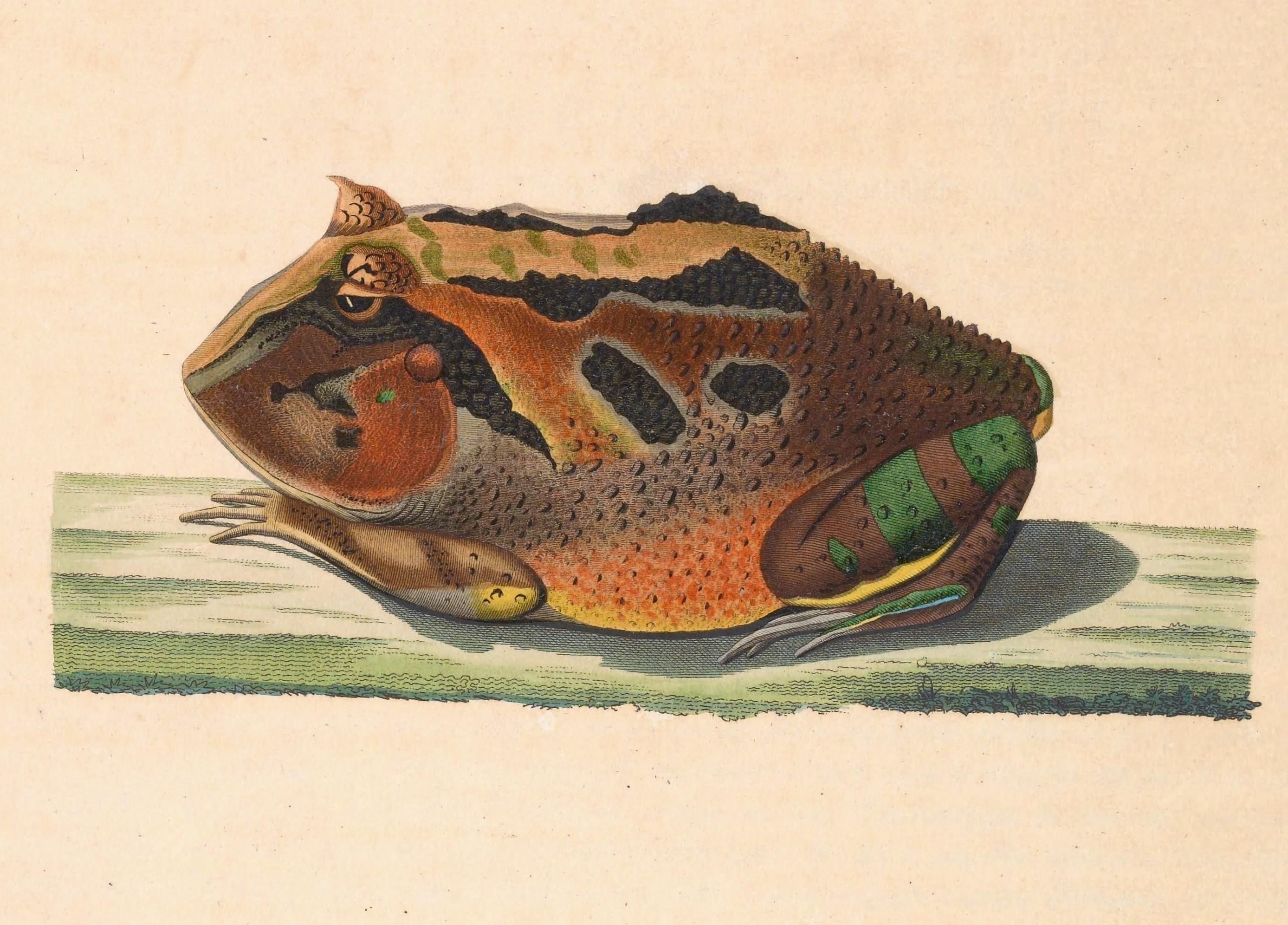
