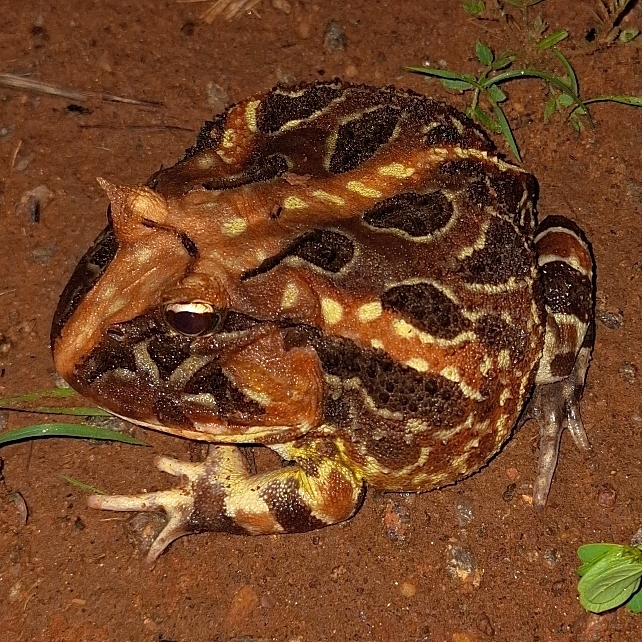

Conservation status
- Least Concern (IUCN 3.1)

Scientific classification
- Kingdom: Animalia
- Phylum: Chordata
- Class: Amphibia
- Order: Anura
- Family: Ceratophryidae
- Genus: Ceratophrys
- Species: C. joazeirensis

Binomial name
- Ceratophrys joazeirensis Mercadal, 1986

= Caatinga horned frog =

Species of amphibian

The Caatinga horned frog (Ceratophrys joazeirensis) is a species of frog in the family Ceratophryidae. It is endemic to Brazil. Its natural habitats are dry savanna, subtropical or tropical dry shrubland, subtropical or tropical dry lowland grassland, and intermittent freshwater marshes. They are voracious predators that use a sit-and-wait feeding strategy to ambush prey, which includes ants and small vertebrates. They are also known to be explosive breeders.
