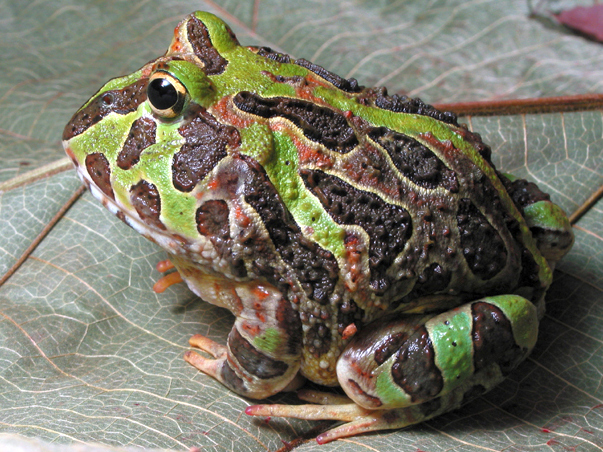

Conservation status
- Vulnerable (IUCN 3.1)

Scientific classification
- Kingdom: Animalia
- Phylum: Chordata
- Class: Amphibia
- Order: Anura
- Family: Ceratophryidae
- Genus: Ceratophrys
- Species: C. stolzmanni

Binomial name
- Ceratophrys stolzmanni Steindachner, 1882

= Pacific horned frog =

Species of amphibian

The Pacific horned frog (Ceratophrys stolzmanni), also known as Pacific big-mouthed frog, Stolzmann's horned frog and Ecuadorian horned frog, is a species of frog in the family Ceratophryidae. It is found in Ecuador and Peru. Its natural habitats are subtropical or tropical dry forest, subtropical or tropical dry shrubland, and sandy shores. Its geographical range is very fragmented; it has a total area of about 20,000 km^{2} and is continuously shrinking due to human activities.

== Reproduction ==
Breeding is triggered by heavy rain fall and Pacific horned frogs reproduce explosively over the course of a single night. Typically, Pacific horned frogs lay underground during day and they are most active after sundown. Male frogs reproduce by approaching females both on land and shallow water and clasp on to the female, in a variation of axillary amplexus, also known as "neck amplexus".

== Diet ==
In the wild, horned frogs fulfill their voracious appetite by eating small fish and rodents, while the adolescents eat smaller bugs and worms. In captivity they usually feed on worms and bugs (typically nightcrawlers, superworms, waxworms, and crickets). They also eat small fish and baby feeder mice, though they shouldn't be a staple of their diet in captivity as it can cause bloating and high fat.

== Behavior ==
Its behavior is usually calm and inactive, even during the night. However, it may roam around if it chooses during the night, though this is rare. If handled by humans, the frog may become aggressive and bite, which can draw blood due to its sandpaper-like teeth, which grow in as the frog reaches maturity. It is also not recommended to put two together in a tank if they are not breeding, as they can attack each other, also one may eat the other.
