= Chaco frog =

Chaco frog may refer to:

- Chaco horned frog (Chacophrys pierottii), a frog in the family Ceratophryidae found in the Chaco of northern Argentina, eastern Bolivia, and western Paraguay
- Chaco tree frog (Hypsiboas raniceps), a frog in the family Hylidae found in Argentina, Bolivia, Brazil, Colombia, French Guiana, Paraguay, and Venezuela
