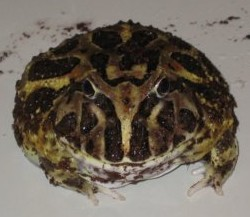

Conservation status
- Least Concern (IUCN 3.1)

Scientific classification
- Kingdom: Animalia
- Phylum: Chordata
- Class: Amphibia
- Order: Anura
- Family: Ceratophryidae
- Genus: Ceratophrys
- Species: C. cranwelli

Binomial name
- Ceratophrys cranwelli Barrio, 1980

= Cranwell's horned frog =

Species of amphibian

Cranwell's horned frog (Ceratophrys cranwelli), also called commonly the Chacoan horned frog, is a terrestrial frog in the family Ceratophryidae. The species is endemic to the dry Gran Chaco region of Argentina, Bolivia, Paraguay and Brazil. It, like other members of its genus, Ceratophrys, is commonly called the Pac-man frog, because of its resemblance to the video game character of the same name. Most adult specimens range from 8–13 cm (3.1–5.1 in) long and can weigh up to 0.5 kg (1.1 lb).

== Etymology ==
The specific name, cranwelli, is in honor of Argentinian herpetologist Jorge A. Cranwell.

== Description ==
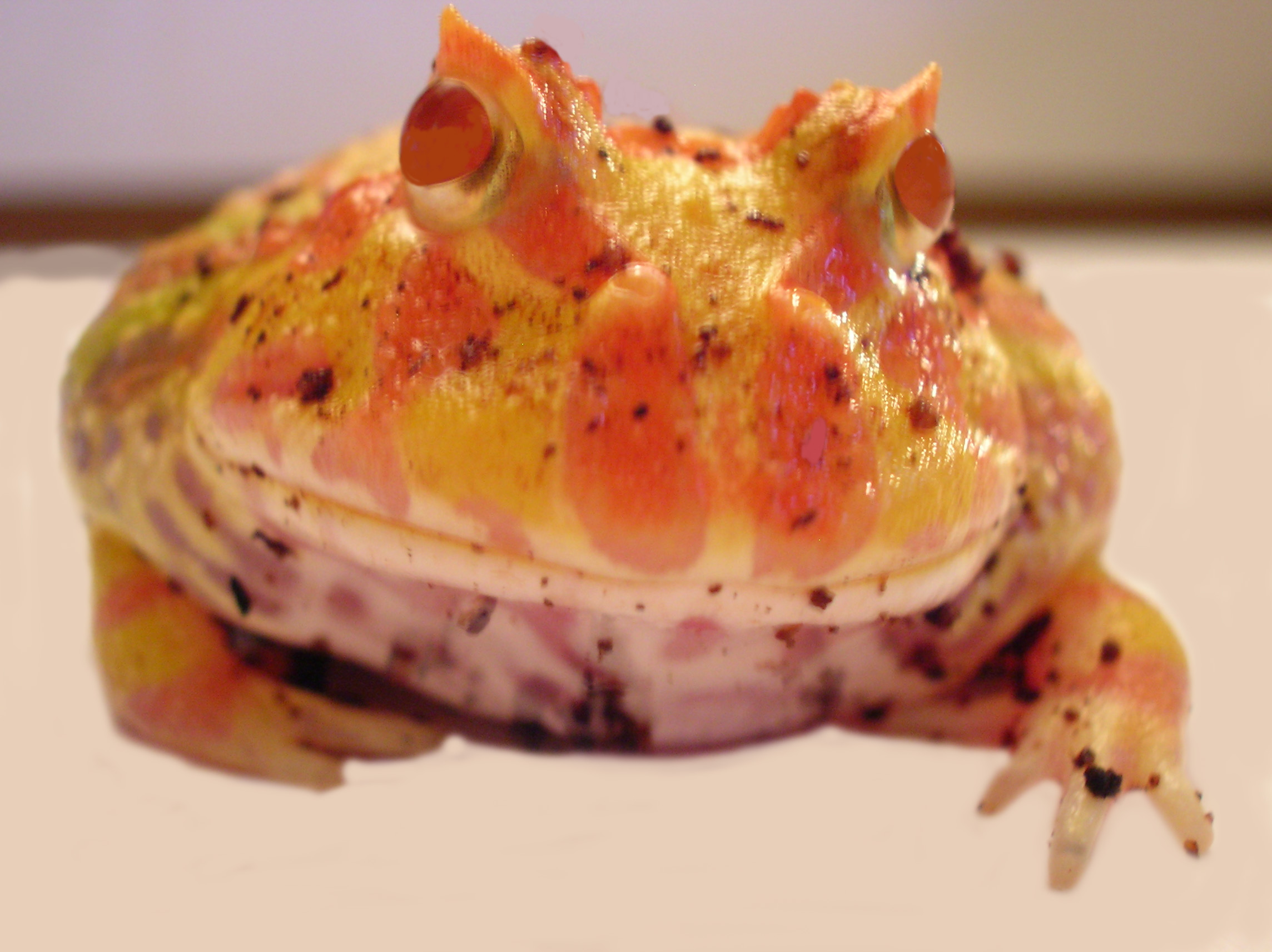
An albino Pacman frog.

The back of C. cranwelli usually has dark green and brown coloration, although albino variants with orange and yellow coloration also exist and are popular in the pet trade. The dark color scheme aids in camouflaging the animal as it burrows and waits for its prey. Though generally inactive, it is an aggressive eater and is capable of leaping for several body lengths to capture prey. It uses its sticky tongue to latch onto prey and its heavy body to remain anchored while consuming prey.

== Diet and behavior ==
Cranwell's horned frog is nocturnal and rests with its eyelids open. It is ordinarily carnivorous, feeding mostly on insects and like-sized animals such as rodents, and is known to cannibalize other frogs. Large individuals have bite forces comparable to those of mammalian predators. Although it is capable of eating animals almost half its size, Cranwell's horned frog sometimes eat things larger than itself. Its bite force is able to immobilize its prey, despite its being half the size of the prey. However, due to a row of teeth along the upper jaw, it is unable to release prey from its mouth, potentially causing it to die by choking.

== Temperature control ==
At extreme temperatures (both high and low), Cranwell's horned frog enters a period of estivation, developing a thick layer of protective skin to trap moisture and aid in respiration. When estivation is complete, the frog uses its front and hind legs to help shed the protective layer. In many cases, the frog uses its jaws to help pull the skin over its back, often eating the skin in the process.

== As pets ==
Like many Pacman frogs, Cranwell's horned frog is very popular as a pet. As such, it should be kept in a humid environment such as an aquarium with moist substrate (not gravel). It should be fed a mixed diet of gut-loaded crickets, earthworms, small mice, and feeder fish. As a rule of thumb, it should be fed every 1–2 days until the age of 18 months, at which point it should be fed once every 4–7 days. It is also a good practice to dust prey items with an appropriate calcium and multi-vitamin supplement to prevent the development of metabolic bone disease. Supplementation should take place 2-3 times per week when young and once a week for an adult frog. Cranwell's horned frog does not require a UVB source to survive but it may aid in calcium absorption.

Because of its large mouth, C. cranwelli is particularly susceptible to impaction especially when young, a condition whereby the frog's gastrointestinal tract is obstructed by a foreign body accidentally swallowed. The foreign body can be almost anything, but in Pacman frogs kept as pets, it is commonly a small rock or piece of gravel used as substrate. Impaction often leads to constipation and malnutrition, and possibly death unless treated promptly with laxatives such as the osmotic diuretic lactulose. In severe cases, the volume of feces in the intestines is so large that the lungs are obstructed and the frog's breathing is impaired. Surgery may be required in the case of severe or chronic impactions.
