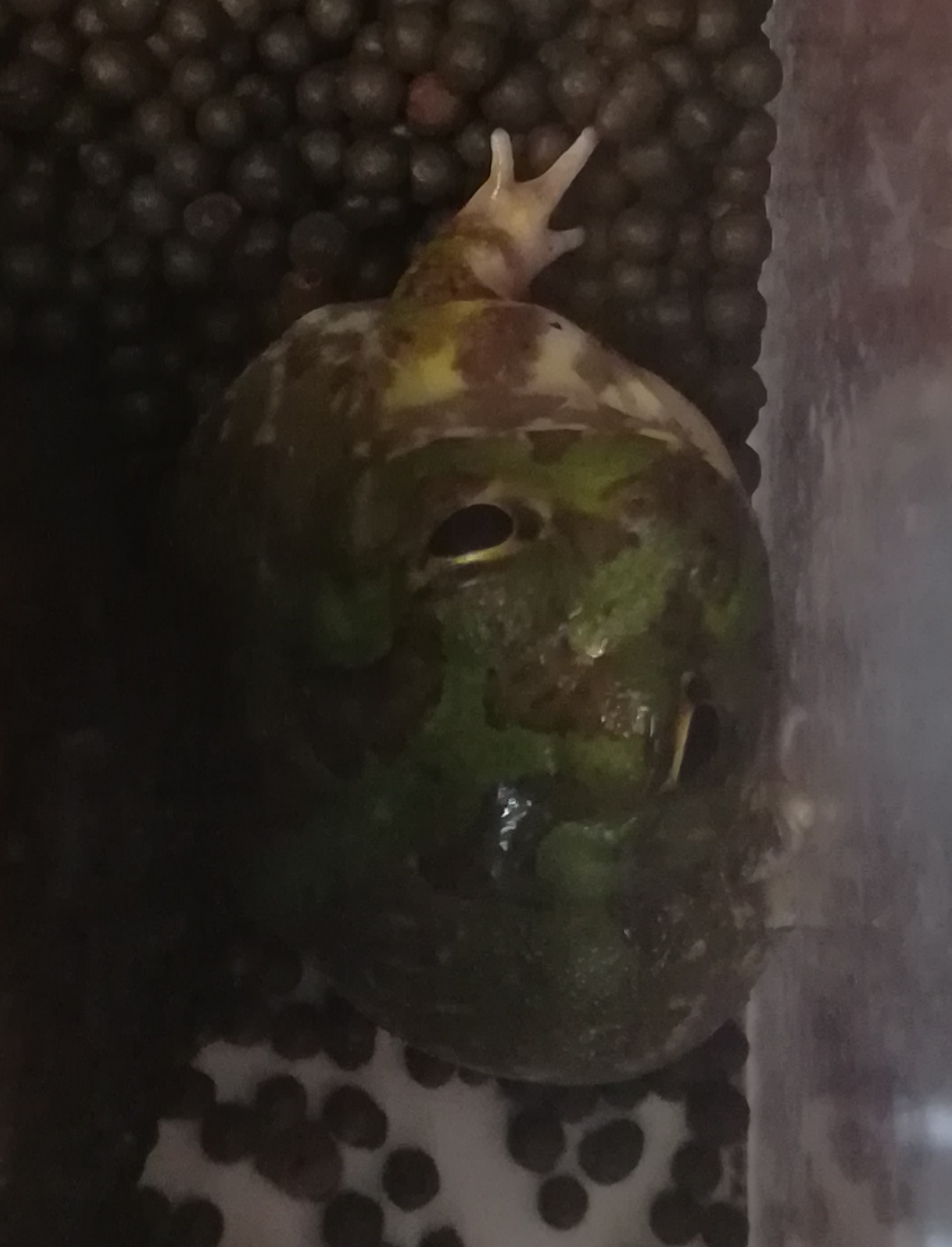
- Chacophrys pierotti

Conservation status
- Least Concern (IUCN 3.1)

Scientific classification
- Kingdom: Animalia
- Phylum: Chordata
- Class: Amphibia
- Order: Anura
- Family: Ceratophryidae
- Genus: Chacophrys; Reig & Limeses, 1963
- Species: C. pierottii

Binomial name
- Chacophrys pierottii (Vellard, 1948)

= Chacophrys =

Genus of amphibians

Chacophrys pierottii, the Chaco horned frog or lesser Chini frog, is a species of frog in the family Ceratophryidae. It is monotypic within the genus Chacophrys. It is found in the Chaco of northern Argentina, eastern Bolivia, and western Paraguay. Its natural habitats are dry shrubland and gallery forest. Outside the breeding season adults remain buried underground but emerge during the first heavy rains to breed in temporary ponds.

It is threatened by habitat loss caused by agriculture and wood extraction. It is also collected for pet trade.

== Description ==
The Chaco horned frog is a small, round frog with short limbs. The snout-vent length ranges from 45.2 - 65.57 mm (1.67 - 2.58 in), and females are typically larger than males. The head comprises almost half of an adult frog's body, with head length ranging from 20 – 24 mm (0.78 - 0.94 in), and head width ranging 19.16 – 29 mm (0.75 - 1.14 in). The eyes stick out prominently on top. The skin is covered in small, granular bumps, which are more prominent on the head and back. The forelimbs are short, and the fingers lack webbing.

Adults may have green or brown splotching along the head and back, and the underside is generally cream or white. Two dark bands typically run from the eyes down the frog's sides.

== Habitat & Distribution ==
Chacophrys pierottii is found only in the semi-arid and arid regions of the Gran Chaco in Northern Argentina, southern Bolivia, and western Paraguay, at altitudes of 70 – 200 m (229.65 - 656.16 ft) above sea level.

== Behavior & Ecology ==
During the dry season, adult Chaco horned frogs spend their time underground. Adults burrow underground, and construct a cocoon of dead skin to preserve moisture.

=== Reproduction ===
Once the rainy season begins, adults emerge and congregate in temporary pools to feed and mate; this activity peaks in January. Males call to attract females, particularly after periods of rain of at least 60 mm (2.3 in). The mating call is repetitive, consisting of 3 - 12 high-pitched notes in a pulsed structure that begin suddenly, then abruptly descend at the end of the call. These notes last between 499 - 1056 ms and are emitted at a rate ranging from 46.2 - 66.6 notes/min. Pulse duration ranges from 3 - 9 ms and pulse rate ranges from 81.8 - 111.7 pulses/s. The primary frequency ranges from 4109.7 - 5060.1 Hz, and secondary harmonics range from 8953 – 9150 Hz. After breeding, the female lays eggs at the bottom of muddy temporal pools that can be anywhere from 15 – 100 cm deep (5.9 - 39.7 in) and often contains submerged vegetation.

After hatching, larvae reach the final metamorphic stage in about two weeks. Adults can live for up to five years.

=== Diet ===
The diet of adult Chaco horned frogs consists mainly of insects, especially beetles, bees, ants, and lepidopterids. They may also consume other anurans opportunistically.
