= Baurubatrachus =

Baurubatrachus Temporal range: Maastrichtian, 70–66 Ma

Scientific classification
- Kingdom: Animalia
- Phylum: Chordata
- Class: Amphibia
- Order: Anura
- Superfamily: Hyloidea
- Genus: †Baurubatrachus; Báez and Perí, 1990

Type species
- †Baurubatrachus pricei Báez and Perí, 1990

Species
- †B. pricei Báez and Perí, 1990; †B. santosdoroi Muzzopappa et al., 2022

Extinct genus of amphibians

Baurubatrachus is an extinct genus of prehistoric frogs found in the Maastrichtian Marília Formation of Brazil, formerly considered to be related to the extant family Ceratophryidae. However, a detailed assessment of the anatomy and relationships of the single known fossil of Baurubatrachus demonstrated that it is not part of Ceratophryidae and might be part of a much ancient group of Neobatrachia.

== Discovery and species ==
The type species of the genus, B. pricei, was found in the Serra da Galga Formation (formerly called the Serra da Galga Member of the Marília Formation), near Peirópolis (Minas Gerais, Brazil), 200 km north of Catanduva City. A second species, B. santosdoroi, was described in 2022 and the remains of two individuals were discovered in the Adamantina Formation cropping out near Catanduva City, São Paulo, Brazil.

== See also ==
- Prehistoric amphibian
- List of prehistoric amphibians
