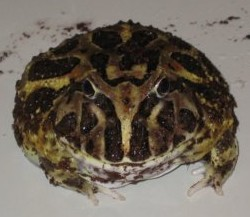
- Ceratophrys cranwelli

Scientific classification
- Kingdom: Animalia
- Phylum: Chordata
- Class: Amphibia
- Order: Anura
- Family: Ceratophryidae
- Genus: Ceratophrys; Wied-Neuwied, 1824

Species
- see text

= Ceratophrys =

Ceratophrys Temporal range: Miocene–Recent

Genus of amphibians

Ceratophrys is a genus of frogs in the family Ceratophryidae. They are also known as South American horned frogs as well as Pacman frogs due to their characteristic round shape, horned brows, and large mouth, reminiscent of the video game character Pac-Man.

== Species ==
There are eight species:

Image	Scientific name	Common name	Distribution
	Ceratophrys aurita (Raddi, 1823)	Brazilian horned frog or Wied's frog	Brazil.
	Ceratophrys calcarata Boulenger, 1890	Colombian horned frog	Colombia and Venezuela
	Ceratophrys cornuta (Linnaeus, 1758)	Surinam horned frog	northern part of South America
	Ceratophrys cranwelli Barrio, 1980	Cranwell's horned frog	Gran Chaco region of Argentina, Bolivia, Paraguay and Brazil.
	Ceratophrys joazeirensis Mercadal de Barrio, 1986	Joazeiro horned frog	Brazil.
	Ceratophrys ornata (Bell, 1843)	Argentine horned frog	Argentina, Uruguay and Brazil.
	Ceratophrys stolzmanni Steindachner, 1882	Stolzmann's horned frog	Ecuador and Peru
	Ceratophrys testudo Andersson, 1945	Ecuador horned frog	Ecuador.

== Appearance and sex differentiation ==
They have green and brown dorsal coloration.

The female frog will typically not "chirp" or "croak" as often as males, but does sometimes. Males frequently have spotted chests, and at about a year old the males develop spots on their "pads" or "fingers". Males will also sometimes have subtle pads on their front legs during mating season, as well as making a sound similar to a cicada to call to their mates. The female frog is also generally larger than the male frog.

== Captivity ==
In captivity, C. cranwelli and C. ornata are the most popular species, along with the "fantasy frog", a captive-produced hybrid between C. cranwelli and C. cornuta. These frogs can live in a terrarium with a floor area 8-10 times the size of the frog. They commonly cover themselves with substrate or just sit contentedly in the water.

== Lifespan ==
The average lifespan of a Ceratophrys frog in the wild varies between 1 and 4 years. In captivity and as pets, depending on diet and care, they may live up to 15 years.

A Pacman frog owner, for example, who offers a roomy and well-kept home, feeds their frog a balanced diet of live insects, and routinely evaluates its health should anticipate their frog to live closer to the higher end of the lifetime range.

== Diet ==
They are voracious eaters, often eating insects, small mammals (such as mice), fish, other frogs, and small reptiles. A fully grown female Argentine horned frog (females are generally larger than males) can easily eat a grown rat. They are sit and wait predators.

These frogs are also known to be cannibalistic, and have been known to eat their mates, even if they are larger than they are.

Although these frogs can swallow animals almost half their size, they sometimes attempt to eat things larger than they are. Their teeth, as well as bony projections in the front of the jaw, can make it difficult for them to release prey after taking it in their mouth, in some cases leading to death by choking.

They have a very sticky tongue which they use to catch prey and pull it into their jaws.

Large individuals have bite forces comparable to those of mammalian predators.

== Gallery ==
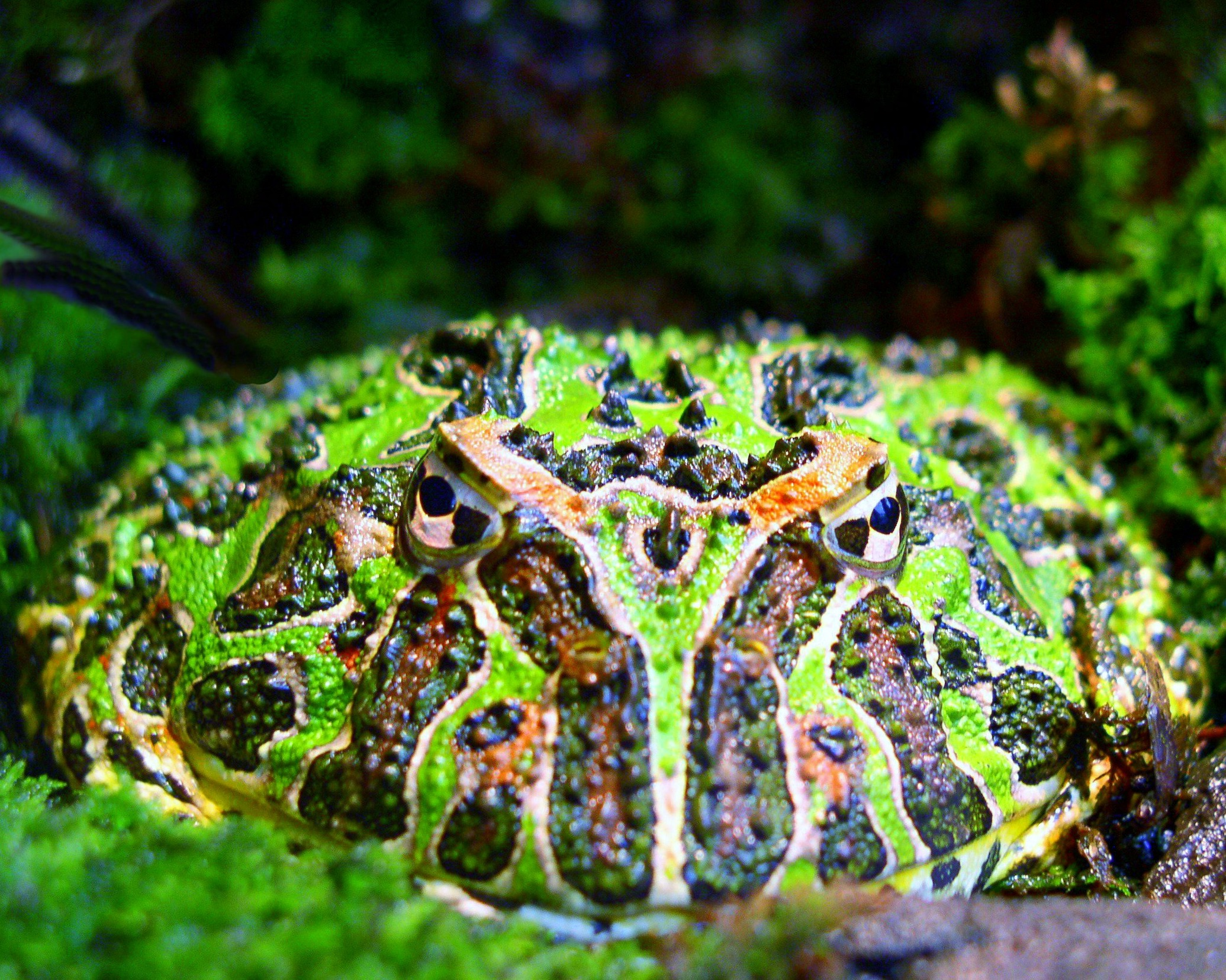
Ceratophrys ornata

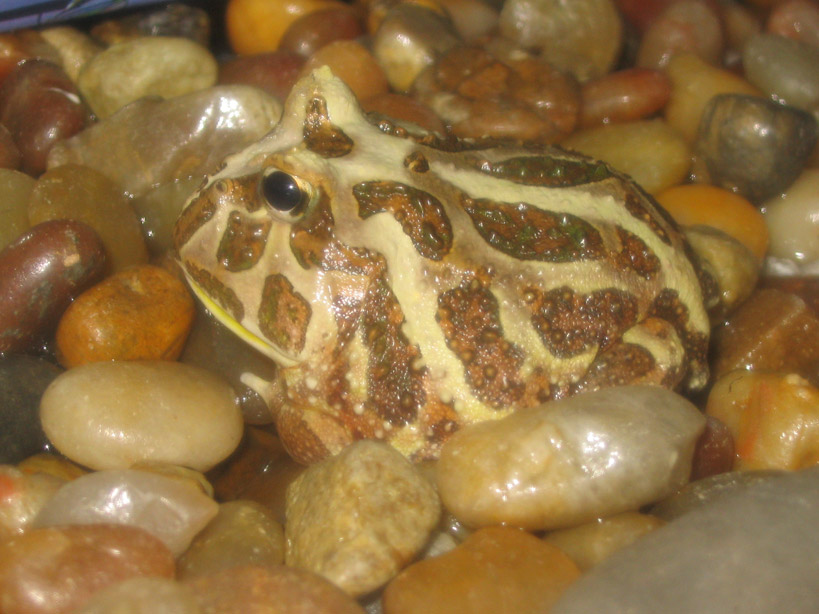
Ceratophrys cranwelli

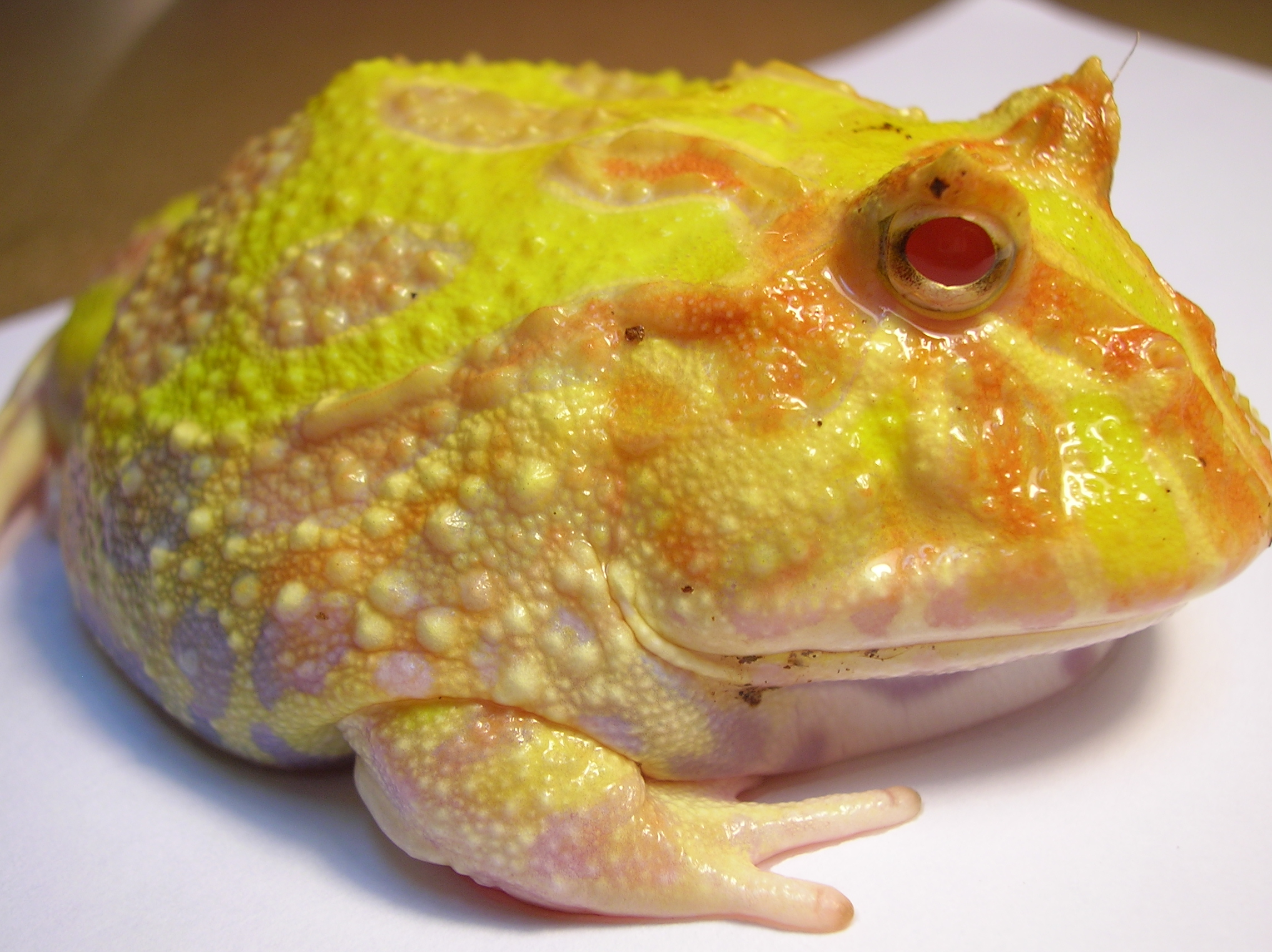
Ceratophrys cranwelli

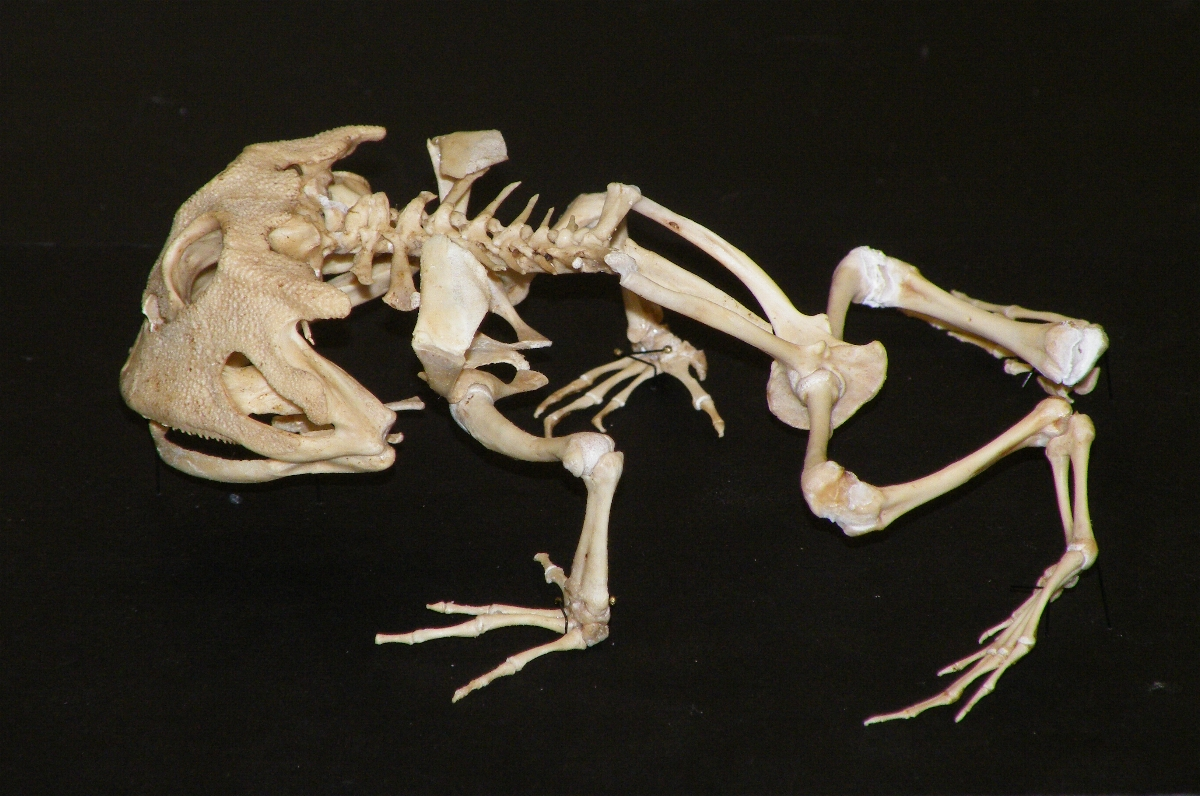
Ceratophrys cornuta
skeleton

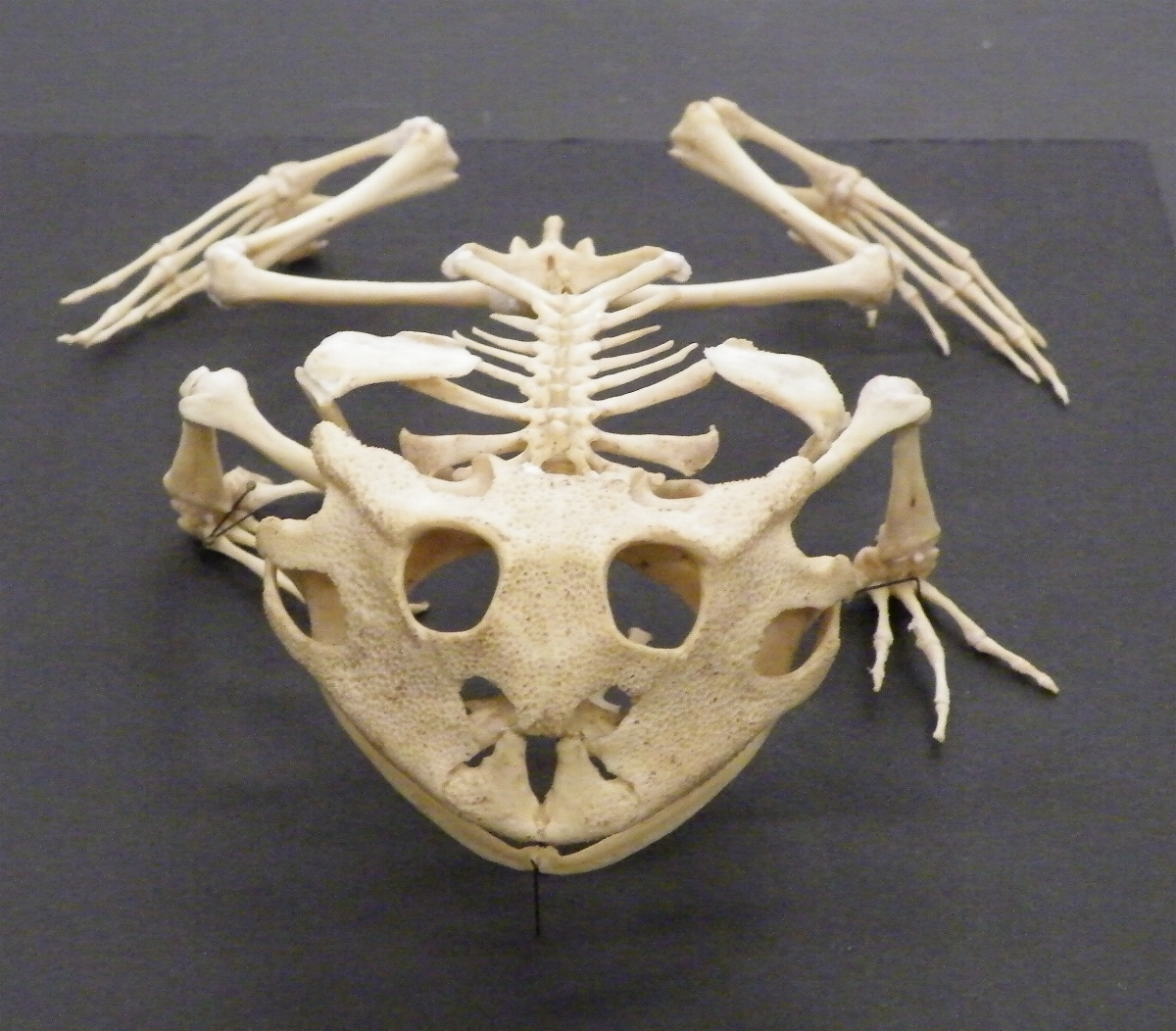
Ceratophrys cornuta
skeleton
