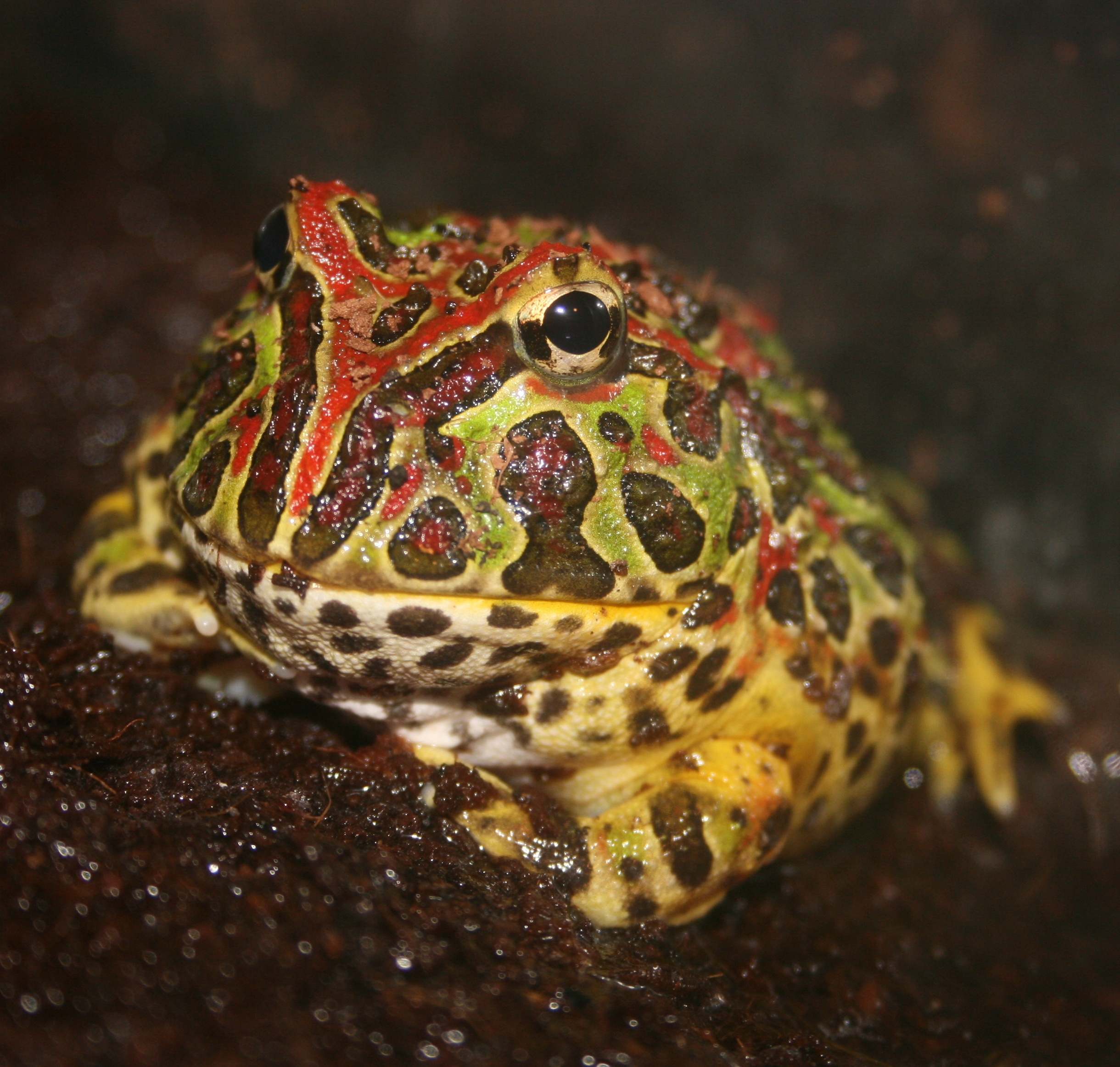

Conservation status
- Near Threatened (IUCN 3.1)

Scientific classification
- Kingdom: Animalia
- Phylum: Chordata
- Class: Amphibia
- Order: Anura
- Family: Ceratophryidae
- Genus: Ceratophrys
- Species: C. ornata

Binomial name
- Ceratophrys ornata (Bell, 1843)

Synonyms
- Uperodon ornatum Bell, 1843; Ceratophrys ornata Günther, 1858

= Argentine horned frog =

Species of amphibian

The Argentine horned frog (Ceratophrys ornata), also known as the Argentine wide-mouthed frog, ornate horned frog, ornate horned toad, ornate pacman frog, or just the pacman frog, is a species of frog in the family Ceratophryidae. The species is endemic to South America. It is the most common species of horned frog, in the grasslands of Argentina, Uruguay and Brazil. A voracious eater, it will attempt to swallow anything that moves close to its wide mouth, such as insects, rodents, passerine birds, snakes, lizards, and other frogs, even if this predator would suffocate in the process. It is also kept as an exotic pet. The nickname "pacman frog" is a reference to the popular 1980's arcade game Pac-Man, where Pac-Man himself eats quite a lot, and has a mouth that takes up most of its body, much like the Argentine horned frog.

== Description ==
The females of C. ornata can grow to be 16.5 cm (6.5 in) SVL and the males to 11.5 cm (4.5 in) SVL. The average lifespan is 6 to 7 years, however they can live up to 10 years or more in captivity. A horned frog's most prominent feature is its mouth, which accounts for roughly half of the animal's overall size. Coloration is typically bright green with red markings, though dark green, parti-color black, and red with dark markings do exist. Sexing this species is very difficult before sexual maturity is reached. Dimorphism traits between the two sexes are size difference and males possessing dark pigmented throats and nuptial pads on the forelimbs. Their hindlimbs are short and lack webbed-feet, which make them inefficient at swimming.

== Feeding ==
All horned frogs, species of the genus Ceratophrys, hunt by remaining motionless, and waiting for prey. They will try to eat anything that can fit in their mouths and some things that can't. Argentine horned frogs have fat bodies that they can draw on as an emergency food source during the dry season or when food is scarce. Their heavy bodies allow the animal to remain anchored while taking on larger prey items. In the wild, their typical diet would include rodents such as mice, passerine birds, small reptiles, other frogs, large spiders, and insects such as locusts. Based on field studies conducted in the native range, this species' diet consists of 50% vertebrates during the adult stage.

Horned frogs are well known for their fearless reputation. They will attempt to consume animals, sometimes equal to or greater than their size. If threatened by a larger animal such as a human, these frogs can deliver a painful bite as they have several odontoid projections (not teeth per se) along the bottom and upper jaw. A bite from an Argentine horned frog can be painful and may require medical attention. Sometimes they will even jump toward their attacker, no matter their size and power. In captivity, these frogs' natural diet is fairly easy to recreate. When kept as a pet, the horned frogs are usually fed a staple diet of calcium-dusted crickets when young and night crawlers as well as the occasional mouse as an adult; they also enjoy – depending on size – live fish. However, studies have proven that primarily feeding horned frog mice causes fat build-up, which often results in blindness and death.

== Reproduction ==
Argentine horned frogs reproduce sexually. The Argentine horned frog's females deposit about 2,000 eggs in water and within two weeks they become tadpoles. A male Argentinian frog will use its nuptial pads to grasp the female while the eggs are fertilized.

== Gallery ==
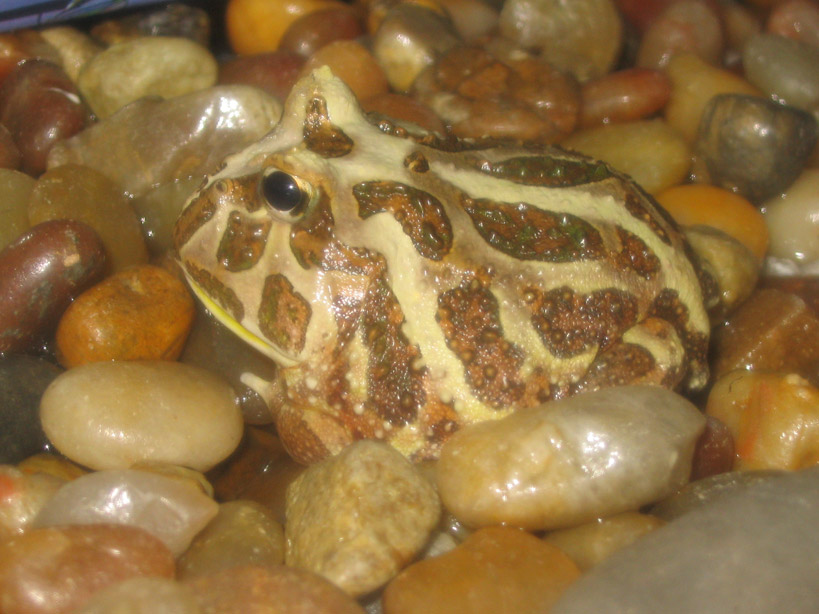
A young Argentine pacman frog

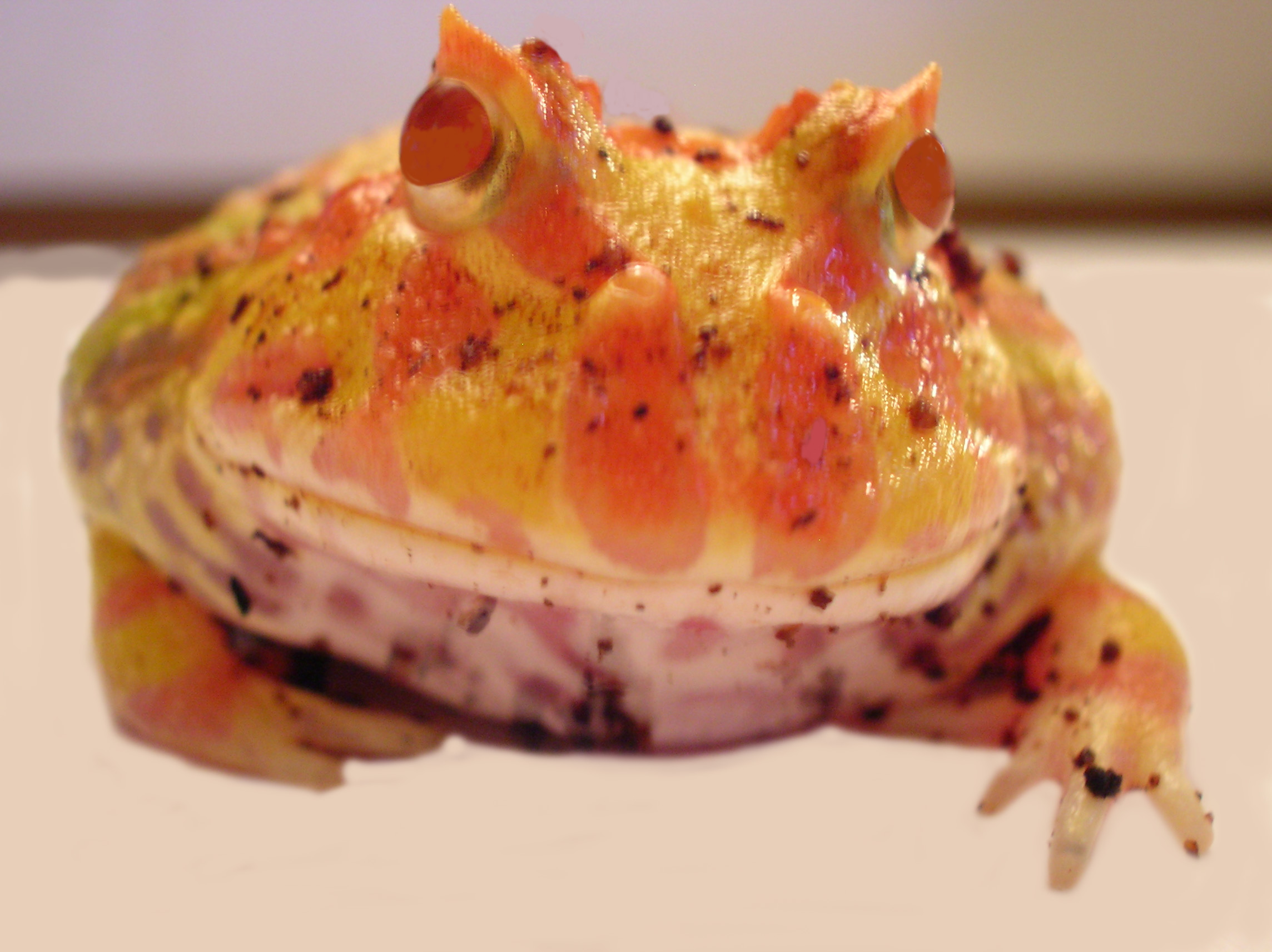
Albino Argentine pacman frog, with brilliant yellow color

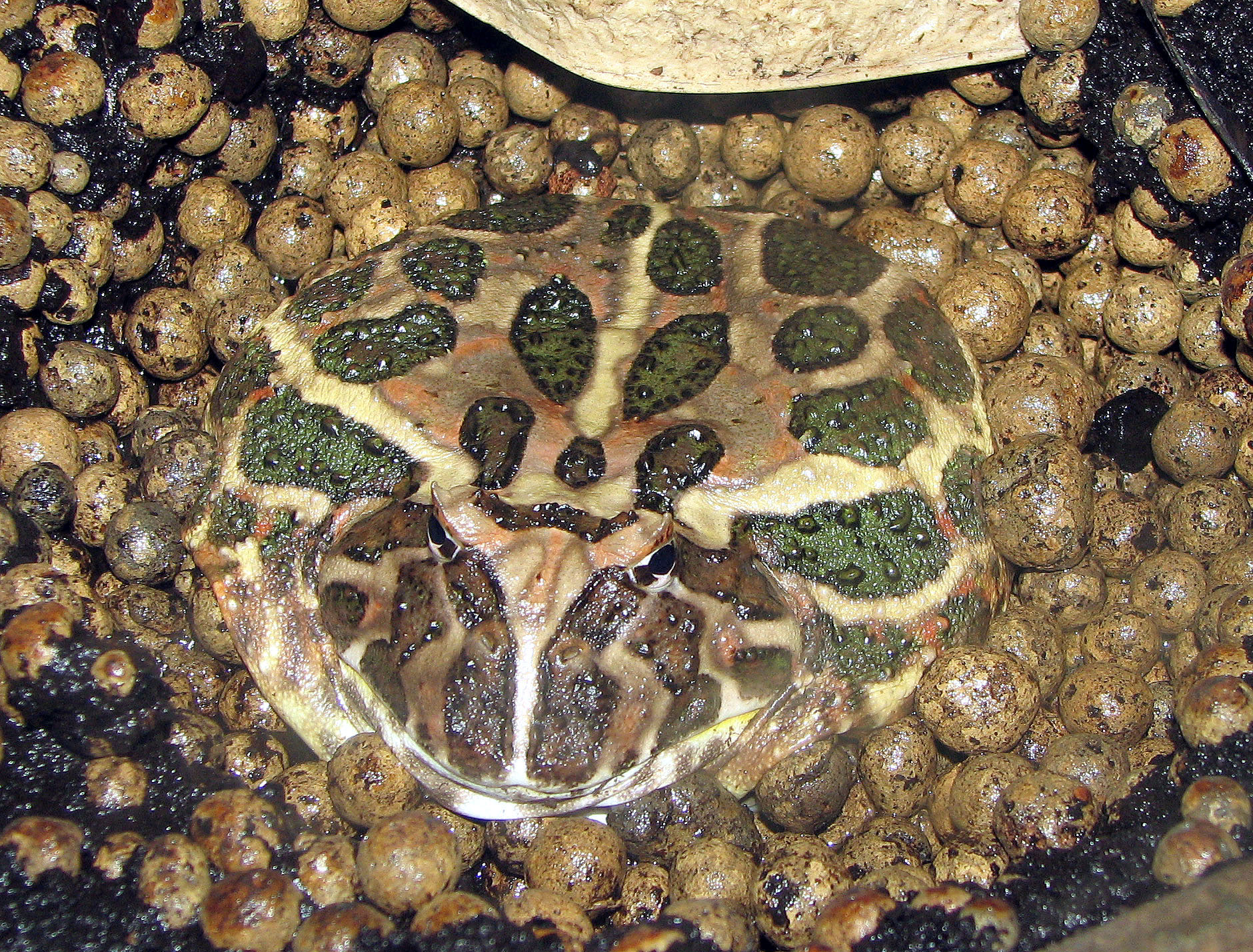
Argentine horned frog Ceratophrys ornata

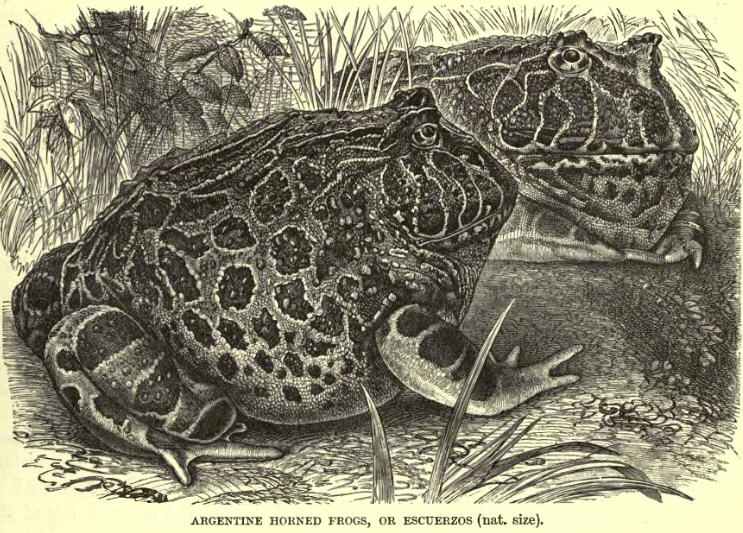
1896 lithograph by R. A. Lydekker for The Royal Natural History

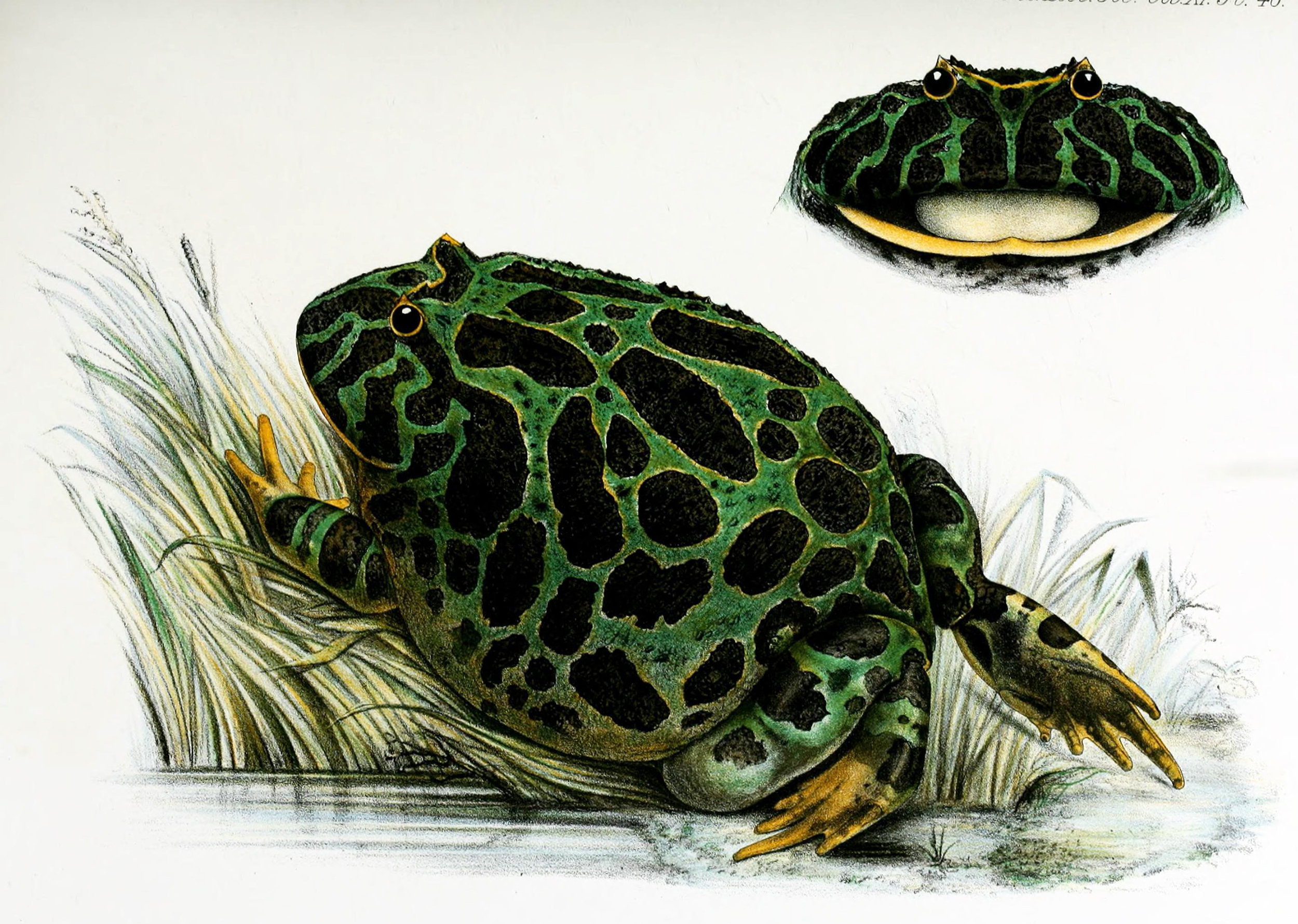
1885 lithograph by R. Mintern

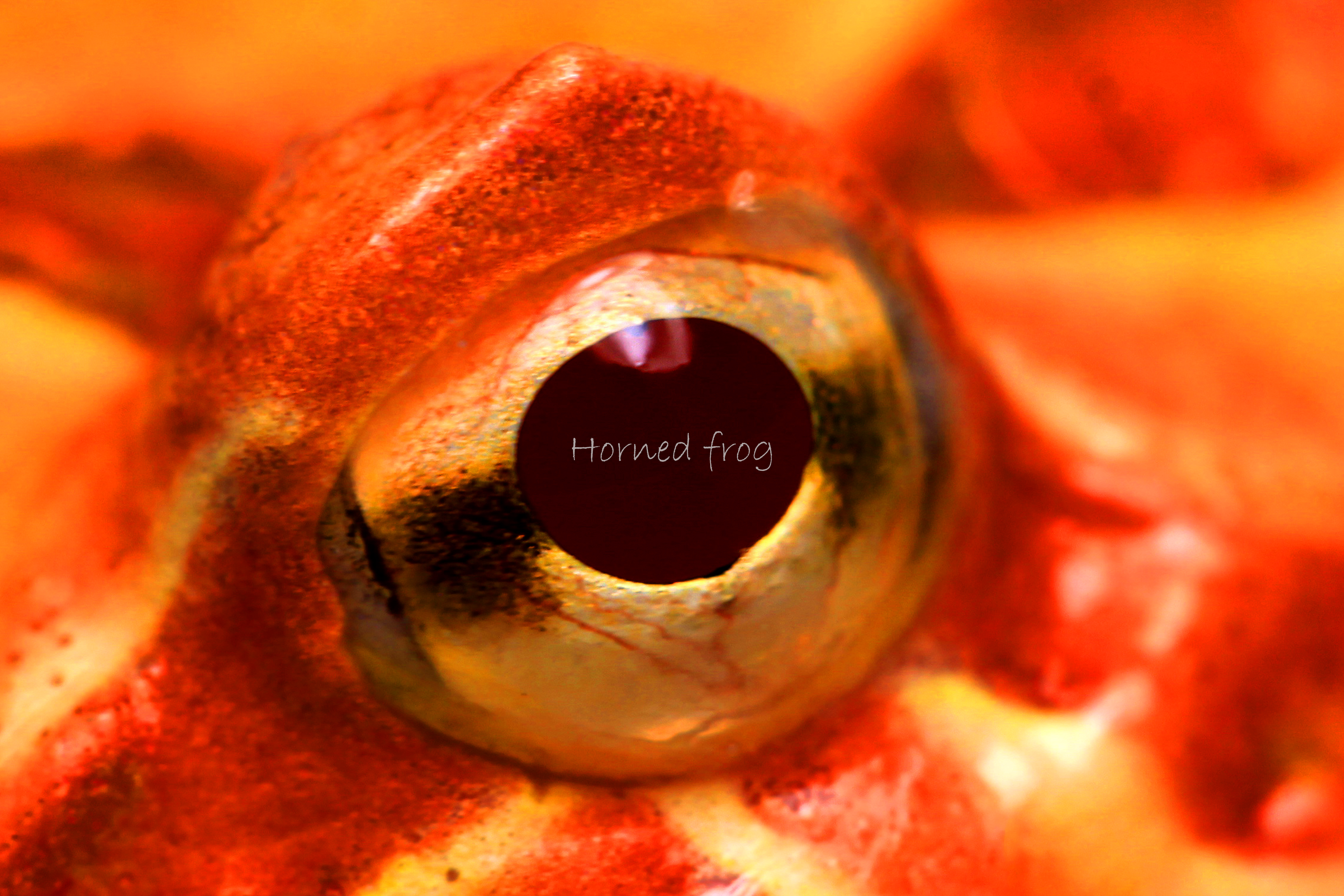
Eye external features of a frog

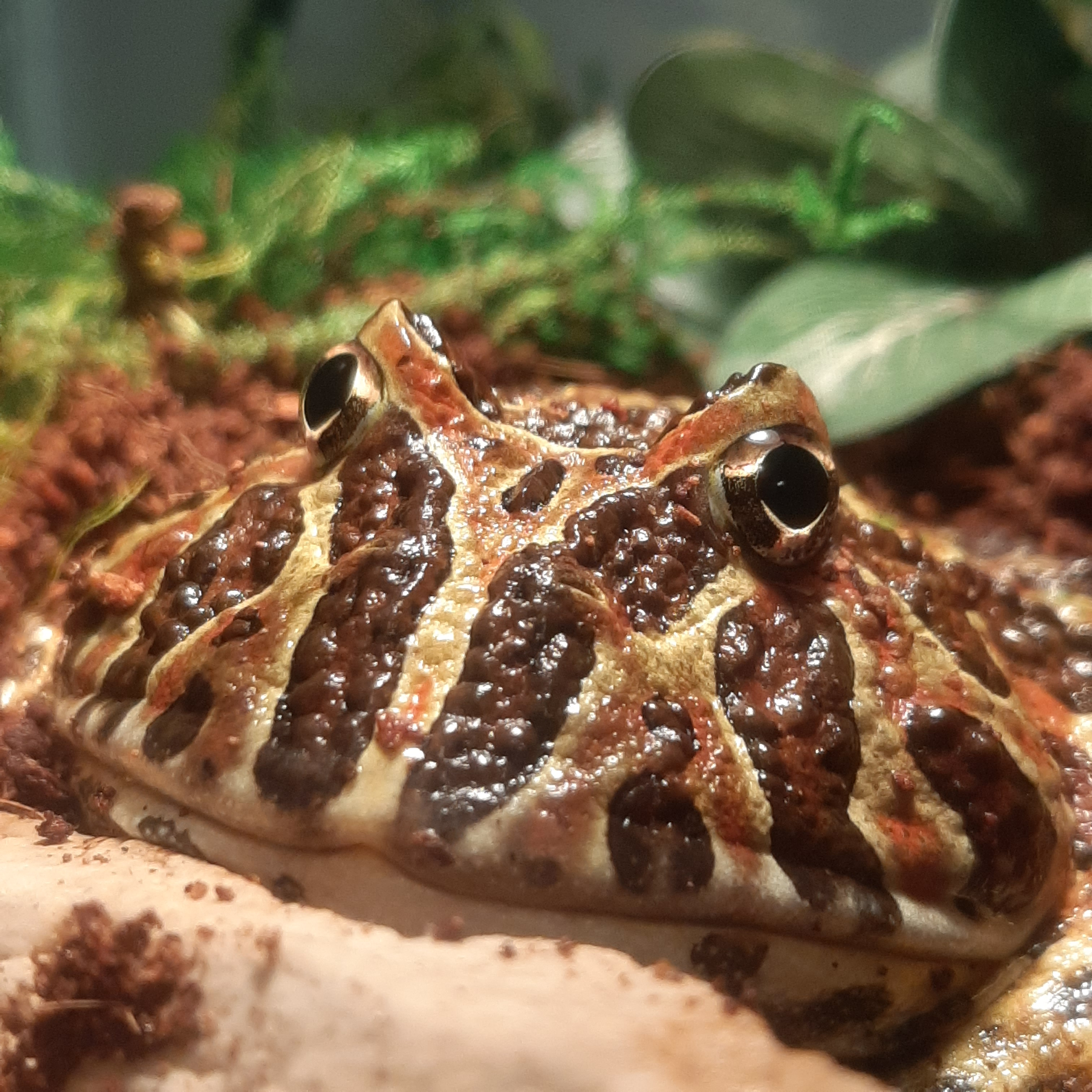
A close-up of an adult male High Red Ornate Pacman Frog.

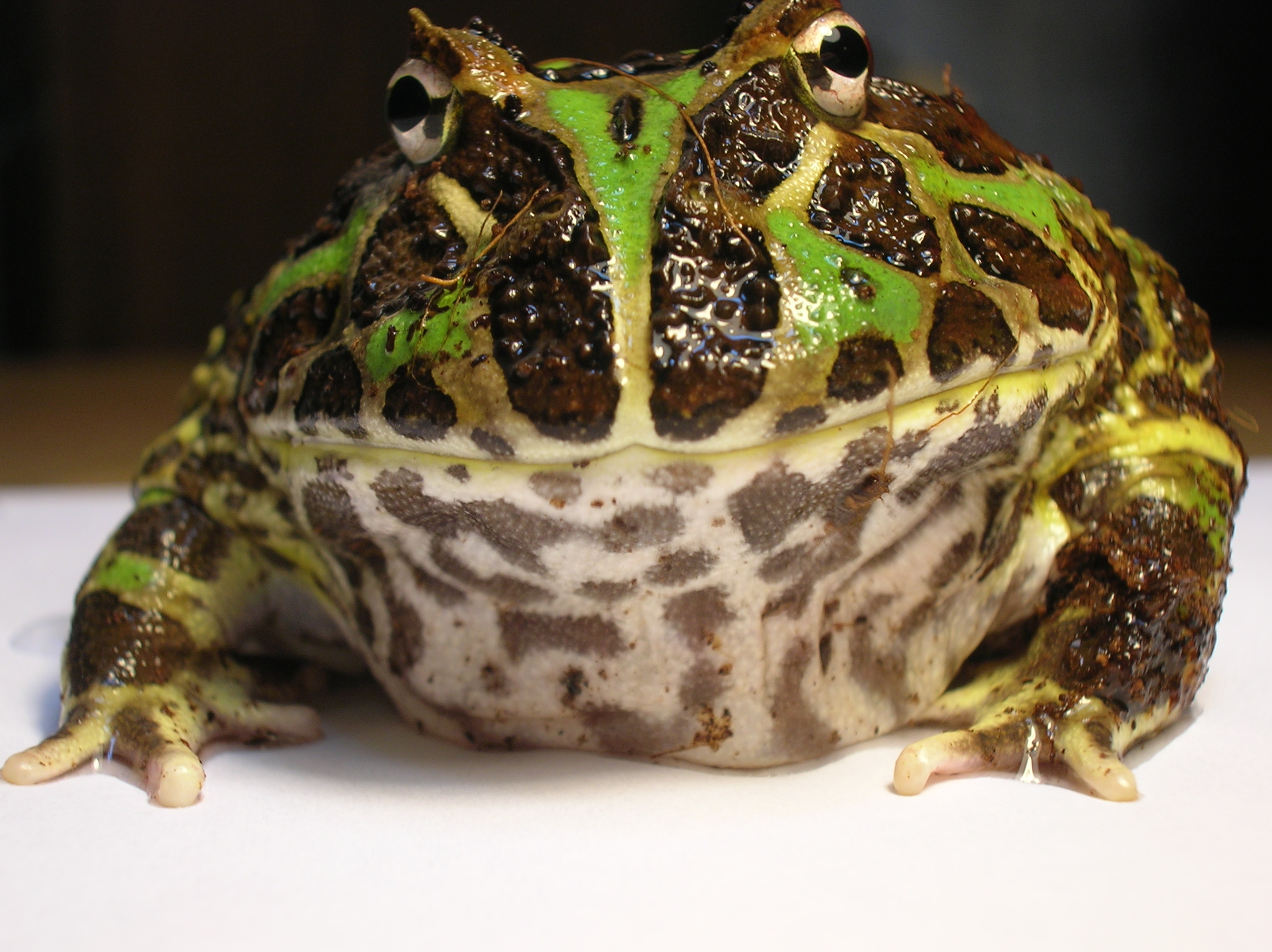
An Argentine horned frog

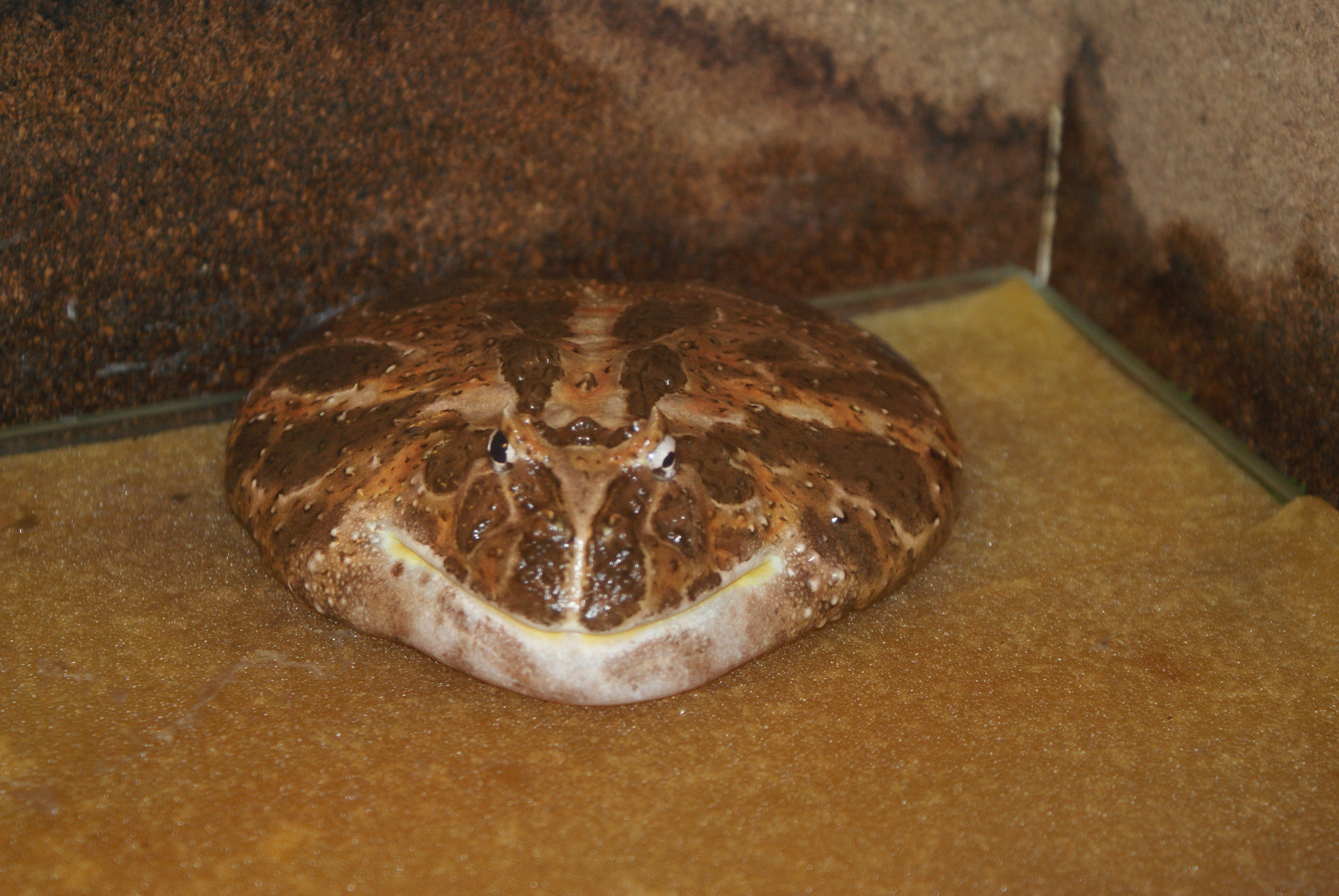
At Prague Zoo
