= History of dendrobatid frogkeeping =

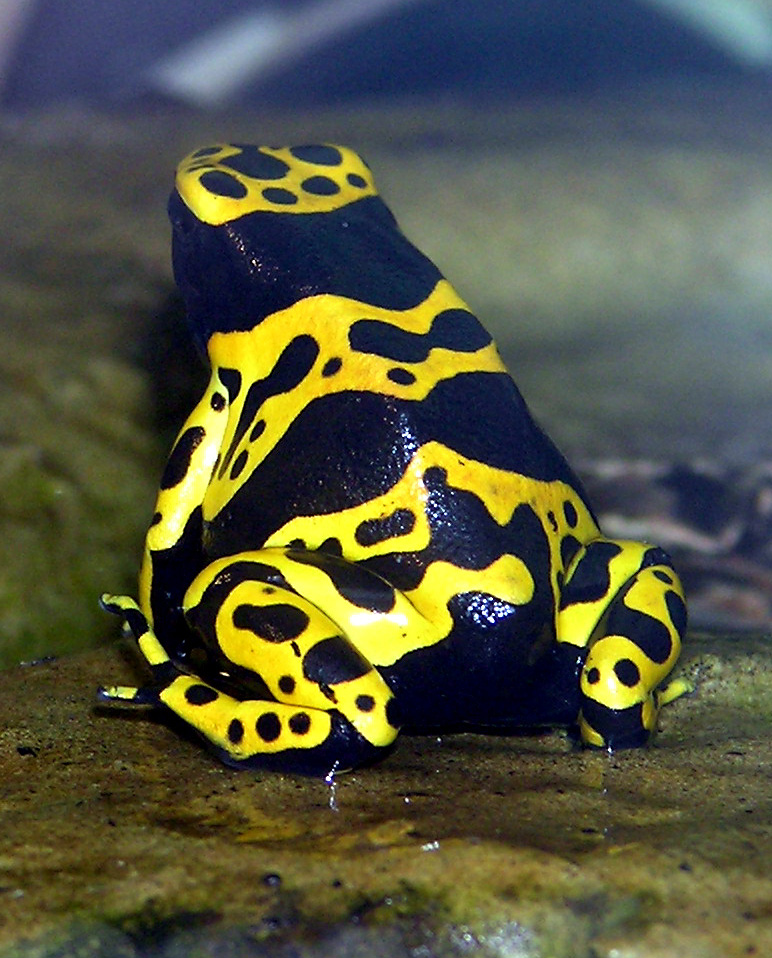
Yellow-banded poison dart frog Dendrobates leucomelas from Venezuela, Guyana and Brazil, in captivity in Bristol Zoo, England

Poison dart frogs have been regularly maintained and bred in captivity since the 1970s. The International Zoo Yearbook reported in 1977 that Stuttgart Zoo bred Phyllobates bicolor and Zoo Basel bred Dendrobates auratus.

The first documented successful captive propagation of dendrobatids in the United States is a report by David Grow that describes breeding success for Dendrobates auratus at the Sedgwick County Zoo in Wichita, Kansas. By the 1980s, dart-frogs were being kept by hobbyists and not just by zoos and scientific institutions.

In the United Kingdom, the British Dendrobatid Group (BDG) was set up in 1989 by Bob Davies and Malcolm Peaker. Despite its name, the BDG was an international group of people concerned with one objective: the conservation and captive breeding of a small group of South American frogs belonging to the genera Dendrobates, Phyllobates and Oophaga, as well as similar, related genera such as the Madagascan Mantella species.

There is evidence from publications that these frogs may have been maintained by private individuals in mainland Europe considerably earlier than this, even starting in 1932.

Dendrobates tinctorius azureus was bred successfully at Paignton Zoo in February 2018.
