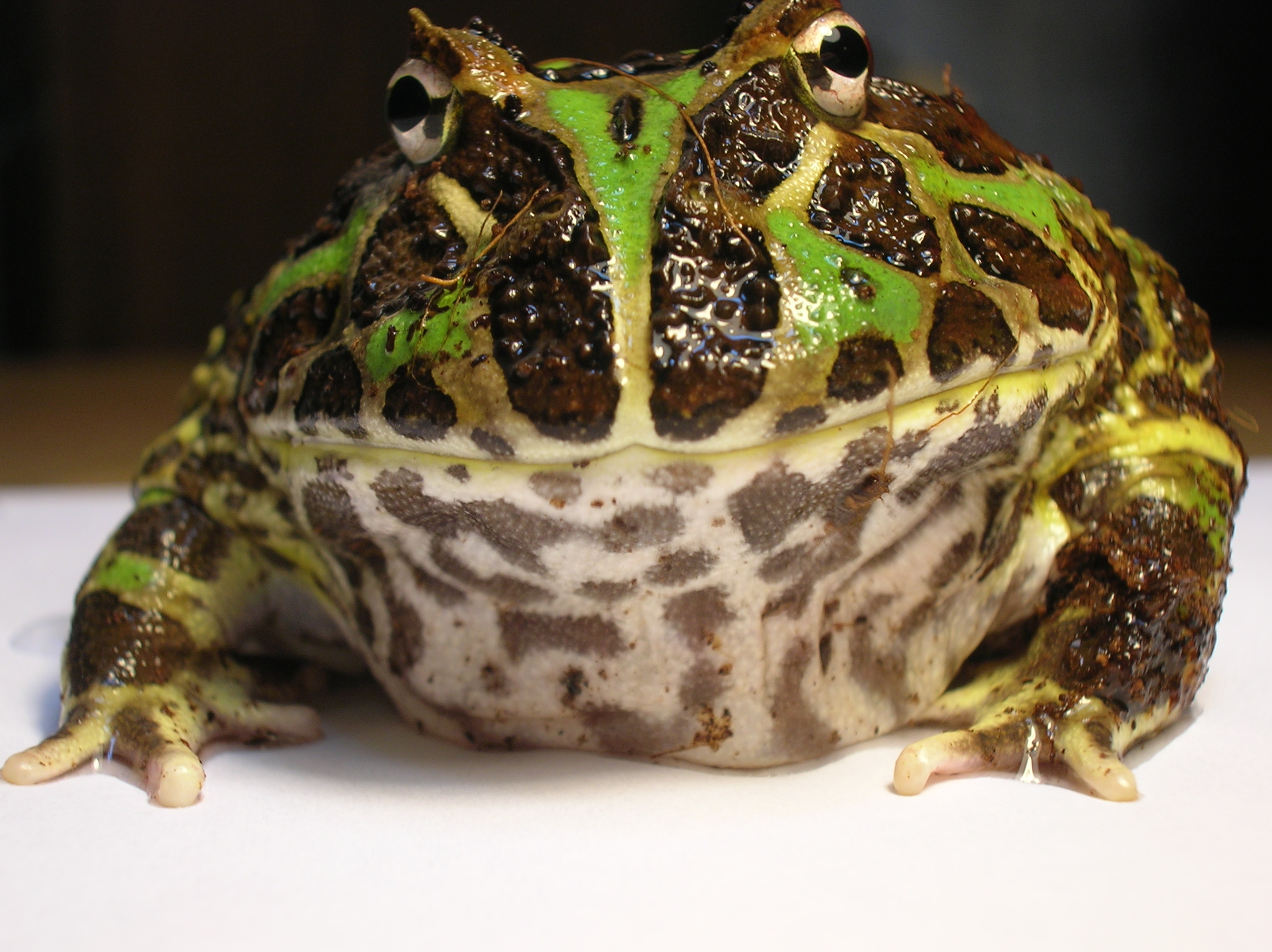
- Ceratophrys ornata

Scientific classification
- Domain: Eukaryota
- Kingdom: Animalia
- Phylum: Chordata
- Class: Amphibia
- Order: Anura
- Superfamily: Hyloidea
- Family: Ceratophryidae; Tschudi, 1838

Genera
- 3 extant genera, see text.

= Ceratophryidae =

Ceratophryidae Temporal range: Miocene–Recent (possible Late Cretaceous occurrence of Beelzebufo and Baurubatrachus)

Family of amphibians

The Ceratophryidae, also known as common horned frogs, are a family of frogs found in South America. It is a relatively small family with three extant genera and 12 species. Despite the common name, not all species in the family have the horn-like projections at the eyes. They have a relatively large head with big mouth, and they are ambush predators able to consume large prey, including lizards, other frogs, and small mammals. They inhabit arid areas and are seasonal breeders, depositing many small eggs in aquatic habitats. Tadpoles are free-living and carnivorous (Ceratophrys and Lepidobatrachus) or grazers (Chacophrys).

Some species (especially from the genera Ceratophrys and Lepidobatrachus) are popular in herpetoculture.

The oldest fossils of the family are known from the Miocene epoch. The fossil giant frog Beelzebufo from the Late Cretaceous of Madagascar was formerly considered to belong to this family, but is now excluded, but is possibly closely related, alongside Baurubatrachus from the Late Cretaceous of Brazil. Wawelia from the Miocene of Argentina is no longer considered closely related.

== Taxonomy ==
Placement of this clade has varied considerably over time, having been a subfamily within the Leptodactylidae for a long while. Later on, it has been raised to family level, either broadly defined, including the Telmatobiidae and Batrachylidae (as subfamilies Telmatobiinae and Batrachylinae, respectively), or as now is commonly accepted, as a smaller family with three genera.

== Genera ==
The extant genera are:

- Ceratophrys Wied-Neuwied, 1824 (8 species)
- Chacophrys Reig & Limeses, 1963 (monotypic: Chacophrys pierottii (Vellard, 1948))
- Lepidobatrachus Budgett, 1899 (3 species, 1 fossil species)

In addition, a number of fossil taxa have been considered to be closely related, including:

- †Beelzebufo Evans, Jones, & Krause, 2008 (monotypic: Beelzebufo ampinga (Evan, Jones & Krause, 2008))
- †Baurubatrachus Báez and Perí, 1990 (2 species)
