= Brogden (surname) =

Brogden is a surname, and may refer to:

- Alexander Brogden (1825–1892), son of John Brogden the industrialist
- Curtis Hooks Brogden (1816–1901), North Carolina governor
- Gwendoline Brogden (1891–1973), British stage actress
- Henry Brogden (1828–1913), English engineer, son of John Brogden the industrialist
- James Brogden (MP) (c.1765–1842), British merchant, company director, speculator and politician
- James Brogden (industrialist) (1832–1907), son of John Brogden the industrialist
- John Brogden (jeweller) (1819–1884), British manufacturing jeweller
- John Brogden (politician) (born 1969), New South Wales politician
- John Brogden (industrialist) (1798–1869), English industrialist
- John Brogden Jun. (industrialist) (1823–1855), son of John Brogden
- John Brogden (politician) (born 1969), Australian businessman, philanthropist and politician
- Lee Brogden (born 1949), English footballer
- Leon Brogden (1910–2000), American sports coach
- Stan Brogden (1910–1981), British Rugby League footballer
- Willis J. Brogden (1877–1935), Justice of the North Carolina Supreme Court
