= Brogden =

Brogden can refer to:

== People ==
- Brogden (surname)

== Places ==
- Brogden, Lancashire, England
- Brogden, North Carolina, U.S.
- Brogden Middle School, a school in Durham, North Carolina, U.S.

== Other uses ==
- John Brogden and Sons Railway Contracts, Coal and Iron Mines, Iron Smelting.
- Brogden v Metropolitan Rly Co, English contract law case.
- Brogden (avocado), an avocado cultivar
