= John Brogden =

John Brogden may refer to:

- John Brogden (industrialist) (1798–1869), British railway industrialist
- John Brogden Jun. (industrialist) (1823–1855), British railway industrialist
- John Brogden (jeweller) (1819–1884), British Victorian-era jeweller
- John Brogden (politician) (born 1969), Australian politician

== See also ==
- John Brogden and Sons
