= Parc Slip Colliery =

Welsh coal mine of the late 19th century

Coordinates: 51.541°N 3.596°W

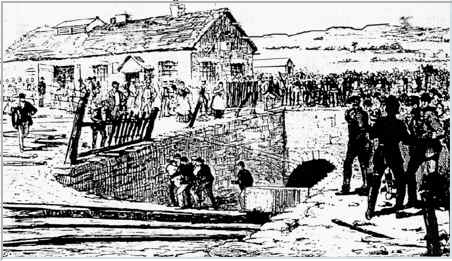
Contemporary engraving of the colliery entrance in 1892

Parc Slip Colliery was a coal mine near situated at Aberkenfig, near Tondu in Bridgend County Borough, Wales.

== History ==
=== Parc Slip Colliery: 1860-1904 ===
This pit was opened in the 1860s by John Brogden and Sons. In 1872 Brogdens merged with the Llynfi Coal and Iron Company Ltd to make the Llynfi, Tondu and Ogmore Coal and Iron Company. This failed in 1878. Eventually the mine was taken over by North's Navigation Ltd. . They had to work the difficult geology near the southern outcrop.

=== 1892 Mining Accident ===
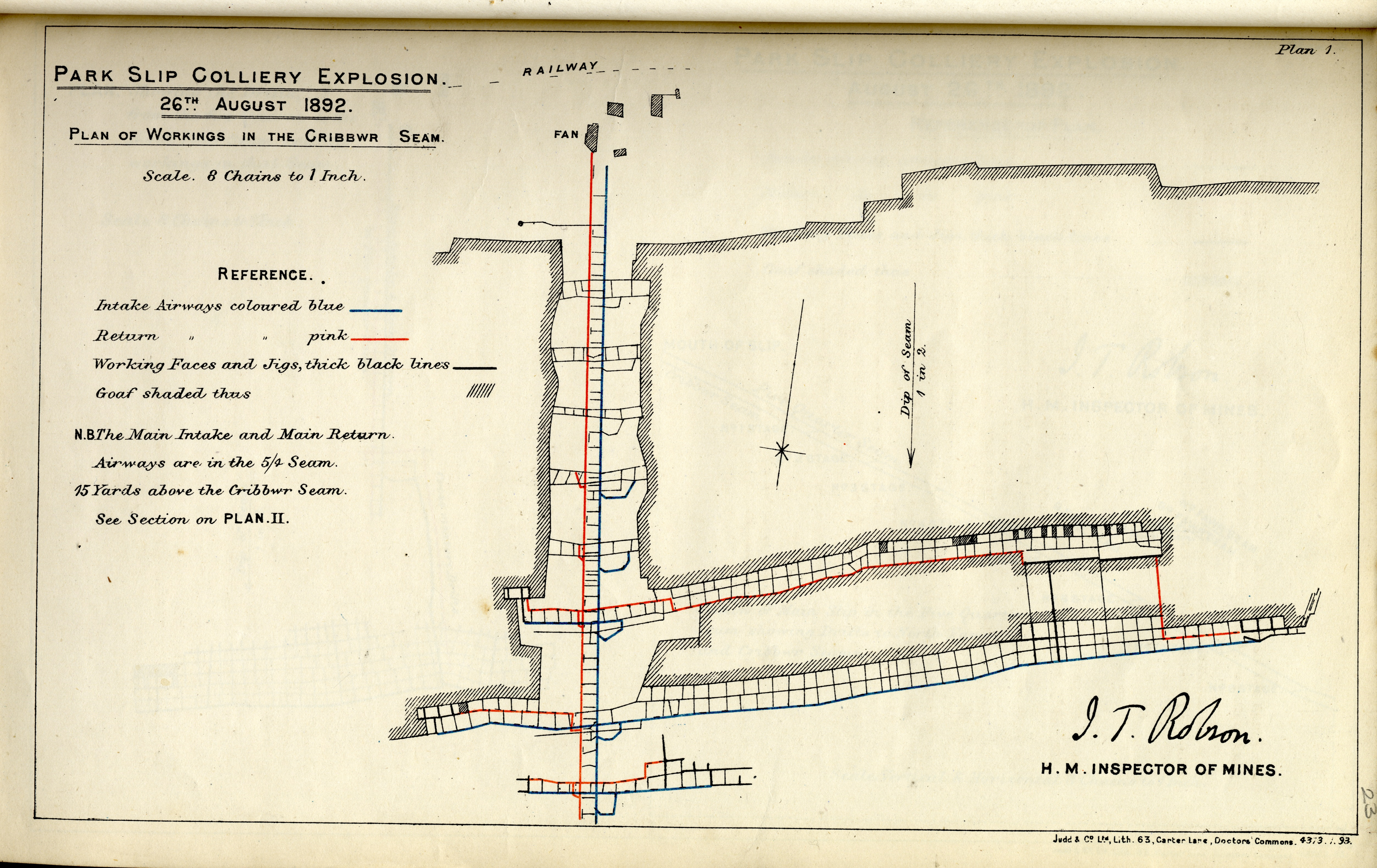
Park Slip Colliery Explosion Report 26 August 1892 diagram

Closed in 1904, the colliery is remembered for a mining accident that occurred at 8:20 am on 26 August 1892 as 146 men and boys were working within the mine. This was the day of the annual St Mary Hill Fair when everyone looked forward to a day of relaxation, but they all heard the explosion and knew immediately what it meant.

The explosion was apparently caused by a hole in one of the workers' Davy lamps. Rescue attempts were hampered by roof falls, but by 4 pm 42 miners had been brought out alive, some of whom died later of their injuries. The final death toll was 112 men and boys.

=== Opencast Mine: 1960s-2008 ===
Redeveloped by the National Coal Board in the 1960s as an opencast mine, the site enveloped the entire working of the former colliery, eventually covering a site size of over 300acres, when it became known as the Margam Opencast Mine.

After the privatisation of British Coal, the site was mothballed, before being reopened in 2001 by Celtic Energy as a land reclamation scheme until 2008, when all coal extraction ceased.

== Present ==
As part of the land reclamation agreement, Celtic Energy were responsible for the land restoration as it originally was. After mining ceased in 2008, a series of legal cases were undertaken by both Bridgend County Borough Council and the Welsh Assembly Government against Celtic Energy. This culminated in 2013 with the Serious Fraud Office bringing charges against two former directors of Celtic Energy and four other individuals, who it was alleged had conspired to move the ownership of Parc Slip and five other sites to companies registered in the British Virgin Islands, to avoid the costs of land restoration. The cases were eventually dismissed by the High Court in late 2014.

In 2016, in light of the large scale flood within the former opencast workings, Celtic Energy proposed an alternative restoration scheme to Bridgend County Council. This would remove the structures and infrastructure of the former workings, reduce the size and scale of the flooded former opencast workings, and reshape some of the above ground tip mounds, together with some seeding which would then be landscaped by the Council.

Accepted by the Council, the site is now a nature reserve with a mix of habitats including grassland, woodland and wetlands, which is managed by the Wildlife Trust of South and West Wales.
