= Ulverstone and Lancaster Railway =

Extinct railway company in northern England

The Ulverstone [sic] (Note: The old name "Ulverstone" was still used in legal documents after it had been superseded by "Ulverston" in common usage.) and Lancaster Railway Company was short-lived as a business but the line that it built is still in daily use as part of the Furness line. The line runs from Lindal-in-Furness to Carnforth where it joins what was then the Lancaster and Carlisle Railway. The intermediate stations are: Cark and Cartmel, Kents Bank, Grange-over-Sands, Arnside and Silverdale.

== Background ==
In August 1837 George Stephenson, considering the route from Lancaster to Carlisle and thence to Scotland, proposed a curved embankment across Morecambe Bay between Poulton-le-Sands (Morecambe) and Humphrey Head, then following the coast northwards. He was concerned that an inland route over the fells would involve dangerously steep slopes. He saw the viaduct as a national project and he intended that it would trap the silt in order to claim Morecambe Bay for agriculture. In 1843, after considerable debate, this plan was shelved in favour of the present Shap Fell route.

Consequently, Furness, instead of finding the main line on its doorstep, had to make its own arrangements to join its local rail network to the national one. Any short connection southwards would necessarily involve a locally financed crossing of Morecambe Bay and this was a daunting prospect — the quicksands and fierce tides of the bay are still notorious. The 2004 Morecambe Bay cockling disaster reminded many people of the dangers. Nevertheless the iron miners needed a good connection in order to make their product competitive. The directors of the Furness Railway were not in a hurry to take it on so it was promoted by John Brogden and Sons, a Manchester-based firm of railway contractors and promoters who had expanded into iron mining activity in the Furness area.

Ulverstone and Lancaster Railway Act 1851
- Act of Parliament
- Parliament of the United Kingdom
- Long title: An Act for making a Railway from the Furness Railway at Ulverstone to the Lancaster and Carlisle Railway at Carnforth, to be called "The Ulverstone and Lancaster Railway."
- Citation: 14 & 15 Vict. c. cii

Dates
- Royal assent: 24 July 1851

Text of statute as originally enacted

The Ulverstone and Lancaster Railway Act 1851 (14 & 15 Vict. c. cii) received royal assent on 24 July 1851. The directors were: John Brogden (sen.), John Brogden (jun.), Alexander Brogden, Henry Brogden, James Garstang (Alexander’s father-in-law) and Joseph Paxton (later Sir Joseph)., but Richardson has John, John, William Gale and Paxton. The line was planned by McClean and Stileman at 19 miles (31 km) in length of which ten miles comprised embankments, and viaducts across the tidal estuaries of the rivers Kent and Leven. Much of this was sand running to a depth of 30 to 70 feet (10 to 20 m).

== Construction ==
Work on the line was not in full progress until September 1853 owing to shortages of labour and accommodation. McClean and Stileman had resigned as engineers the previous February so construction was superintended by James Brunlees. Brunlees had already completed a similar project and went on to achieve great eminence. The viaducts were built by W & J Galloway & Sons of Manchester. Brunlees and Galloway later collaborated on the Southport Pier. The work was costly however and Brogdens had to ask the Furness Railway for financial assistance. As the Furness Railway could not legally do this, two of their directors: the Earl of Burlington and the Duke of Buccleuch made a loan of £50,000 in their personal capacities. The line was opened on 26 August 1857. Gross expenditure was over £410,000.

== Sale ==
Ulverstone and Lancaster Railway Act 1858
- Act of Parliament
- Parliament of the United Kingdom
- Long title: An Act for authorizing the raising by the Ulverstone and Lancaster Railway Company of further Money, and the selling or leasing of their Railway to the Furness Railway Company; or the making by the Two Companies of Working Arrangements; and for giving further Powers to the Two Companies respectively; and for other Purposes.
- Citation: 21 & 22 Vict. c. xcviii

Dates
- Royal assent: 12 July 1858

In 1858 the Brogdens approached the Furness Railway (FR) for a further loan as traffic on the U&LR had not "come up to expectations". However the FR insisted that they would only offer a loan if the U&LR was sold to them so Brogdens declined this offer. In 1859-1860 the line began to pay its way. It was rumoured that the line would be sold to the London and North Western Railway and in 1862 an agreement was made between the shareholders of the U&LR and Furness Railway. U&LR shareholders received 5% preference stock in the Furness Railway in return for their U&LR shares, not a very large return considering that they had risked losing the money altogether. This railway link was critical to the later industrial development of Barrow-in-Furness and its locality and mining interests. It also caused silt to build up in former tidal areas, creating new agricultural land.

== Sources ==
- Andrews, Michael (October 1965). "The Origins of the Furness Railway". Journal of the Railway and Canal Historical Society. 1: 7–11.
- Andrews, Michael (January 1966). "The Origins of the Furness Railway". Journal of the Railway and Canal Historical Society. 2: 1–7.
- Brunlees, James (1855). "On the Construction of the Sea Embankments, across the Estuaries Kent and Leven, In Morecambe Bay, for the Ulverstone and Lancaster Railway". Proc. Inst. Of Civil Engineers. 14: 239–250.
- Gilpin, Les (2008). The Ulverston and Lancaster Railway. In preparation.
- Gradon, W McGowan (1946). Furness Railway Its Rise and Development 1846-1923.
- Higgins, L.S. (Summer 1978). "The Brogden Pioneers of the early industrial development in Mid-Glamorgan". National Library of Wales Journal. XX (3): 240–252. Archived from the original on 15 October 2008.
- Marshall, J.D. (1981) [1958]. Furness and the Industrial Revolution (reprint ed.). Michael Moon, Beckermet, Cumbria. ISBN 0-904131-26-2.
- Reed, Brian (1969). Crewe to Carlisle.
- Richardson, Joseph (1870). Furness Past and Present. Vol. 1 of 2.
