= James Brogden =

James Brogden may refer to:

- James Brogden (MP) (c. 1765–1845), Member of Parliament for Launceston 1796–1832
- James Brogden (industrialist) (1832–1907), junior partner in John Brogden and Sons
