= Mont Cenis Pass Railway =

Railway line in France and Italy (1868–1871)

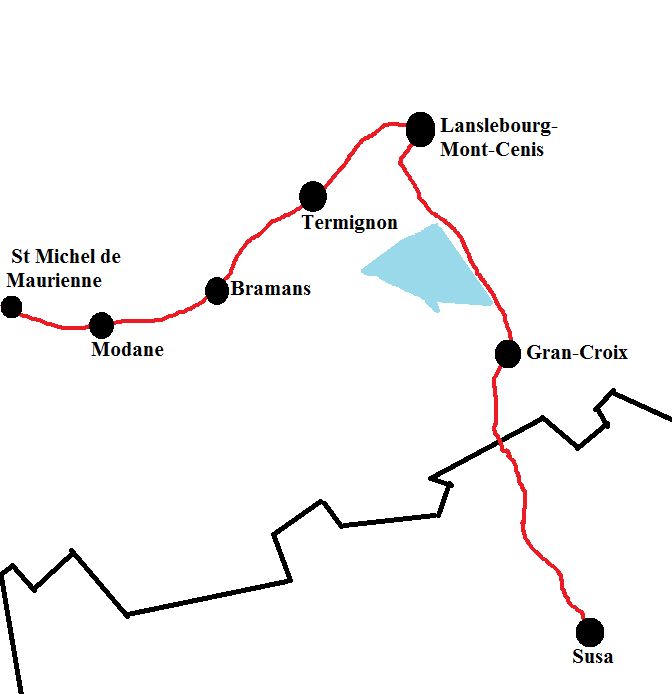
The route

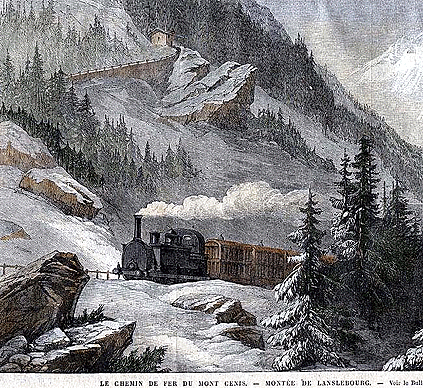
Mont Cenis Pass train

The Mont Cenis Pass Railway operated from 1868 to 1871 (with some interruptions) during the construction of the Fréjus Rail Tunnel through the Alps between Saint-Michel-de-Maurienne in southeast France and Susa, Piedmont, in northwest Italy. It was designed by John Barraclough Fell, and his three-rail design was used on some other mountain railways. The railway was 77 kilometres (48 miles) long, with a gauge of 1,100 mm (3 ft 7 5/16 in). The height at the summit was 2,283 metres (7,490 ft) and the maximum gradient was 9% (1 in 11). It was used to transport English mail to India as part of the 1,400-mile (2,300 km) All-Red Route.

A British company was established in 1864 by a number of British contractors, engineers, and investors to obtain permission from the two governments to build the railway. These included Thomas Brassey, John Fell, James Brunlees, and Alexander Brogden. Having obtained permission, in 1866 they established the Mont Cenis Railway Company to build and run the railway. Although it would eventually be superseded by the tunnel, they believed that during its life, the cost of the pass railway would be repaid with a profit to them. The company used British engine-drivers and workmen.

There were delays in establishing the railway, and it did not start until 15 June 1868. Additionally, the tunnel progressed faster than expected, as new tunnelling methods were developed, and the tunnel was opened on 16 October 1871, resulting in the pass railway being active for a shorter time than expected and leaving the proprietors with a considerable loss. However, the technology proved itself and was used on a number of other mountain railways.

Until this railway was built, rail passengers had to cross the Alps by horse-drawn stagecoach in summer or sledge in winter.

The Pass Railway is sometimes called the Mont Cenis Summit Railway so as to distinguish it from the Tunnel Railway.

== Timeline ==
- In 1849, plans for the Victor Emmanuel Railway were presented to Government of Sardinia.
- In 1850, the project was announced to public.
- In 1854, the Piedmont section of the railway was completed.
- In 1856, the Savoy section was completed as far as Saint-Jean-de-Maurienne.
- In 1854 and 1856, the Suez Canal concession was granted.
- In 1857, the Mont Cenis Tunnel Railway was authorised, with work starting soon after.
- In 1860, Parma, Tuscany, Modena, and Romagna joined the Kingdom of Sardinia. At the same time, Sardinia ceded Savoy and Nice to France.
- In 1861, the Kingdom of Italy was proclaimed, unifying Italy.
- In 1861, Fell proposed the idea of a temporary Summit Railway to the French and Italian Governments.
- In 1862, Direction of the Victor Emmanuel Railway was split between Savoy, France, and Piedmont, Italy.
- In 1866, an agreement with both governments to build the Fell summit line was signed.
- In 1868, on 15 June, the Summit Railway line opened.
- In 1869, Brindisi's port was upgraded.
- In 1869, in November, the Suez Canal opened.
- In 1870, the main Mont Cenis Tunnel was pierced through.
- In 1871, on 16 October, the Tunnel Railway opened. The Summit Railway ended the day before.
- In 1872, the Overland Telegraph connected London and Melbourne.
- In 1873, Jules Verne's novel Around the World in Eighty Days was published, using the completed train service. However, the train should have passed through the Frejus tunnel, so apparently Verne was not aware that Mont Cenis was already closed by then.

== The setting ==
By the early 1860s, most of a 1,400-mile (2,300 km) rail connection between Calais and Brindisi had been built, much of it by Thomas Brassey and John Barraclough Fell. The only major remaining problem was the crossing of the Alps. Work on the Fréjus or Mont Cenis tunnel had started in 1857, but it looked as though it would take many years to build, using traditional tools and gunpowder.

A full rail service from Calais to Brindisi, continuing by sea to Alexandria, would take about 30 hours off the journey time from Britain to India, China, and Australasia compared with the current option of Calais to Marseille by rail and onwards by sea. The increasing volumes of trade, in mail, passengers, and goods, presented a tempting prospect of profits to be made by crossing the Alpine barrier as well as an opportunity to strengthen the ties of Empire. In 1866, at a British Association meeting, Fell reported how four years earlier he had been asked to design some means of improving on the existing horse-drawn transport across the Alps over the Mont Cenis Pass. The slopes and curves were too much for a conventional train, and no such railway had yet been built anywhere, but Fell managed to design a suitable system, with pairs of horizontal wheels beneath the engine bearing on a third rail placed centrally between the running rails, and he patented it. He set a maximum gradient of 1 in 12 (8.3%) and a minimum curve of 2 chains (40 m). The French and Italian governments had agreed to the idea subject to satisfactory testing. The detailed design was carried out by A. Alexander at Brassey Jackson Betts & Co.'s Canada Works in Birkenhead. The gauge was 1,100 mm (3 ft 7 5/16 in).

== Experiments ==
Experiments on the new locomotive were carried out between 1863 and 1865 on a purpose-built railway of 1,100 mm (3 ft 7 5/16 in) gauge near Whaley Bridge adjacent to—and, at one point, passing under—the Bunsal Incline of the Cromford and High Peak Railway at gradients of 1 in 13 and 1 in 12, with curves up to 2.5 chains (50 m) radius. Early experiments were private, but public experiments took place in January. They showed that the light locomotive would not work on the 1-in-12 slope without the central rail drive but could tow four wagons weighing 7 tons each with it.

== Permission to build ==
With this information, the Mont Cenis Concessionary Company was formed on 12 April 1864 to obtain concessions from the two governments to build a railway on the public road over the pass until the tunnel should be opened. The subscribers were the Duke of Sutherland, Thomas Brassey, Sir Morton Peto, Edward Betts, James Lister, Thomas Crampton, Alexander Brogden, James Cross, Fell, James Brunlees, Joseph Jopling, T S Cutbill, and C. Lowinger. Each took one share at £1,000 except that Brassey took three, Fell took two, and Peto and Betts took one between them.

On behalf of the company, Fell approached the French and Italian governments for permission to build the railway. The governments would not be asked for any money. The company expected to make a profit. The French government wanted more proof that the scheme was practicable. The Italians said that they would grant permission if the French did. To provide additional evidence, a second test line was constructed along the zig-zag section from Lanslebourg to the summit. It was 1 1/4 miles (2.0 km) long with a ruling gradient of 1 in 12 and an average of 1 in 13. It started at 5,321 feet (1,622 m) and rose to 5,815 feet (1,772 m). Rails were borrowed from the Victor Emmanuel Railway. This test line was completed by 23 January 1865.

Meanwhile, a second locomotive was built by James Cross and Company of St Helens and was the first engine to be sold by him. It was designed by Alexander after consultation with Fell. Cross was probably used because Brassey's works was very busy.

== Onsite trials ==
The trials were observed by officials from the governments of France, Italy, Britain, Austria, and Russia. There were 600 spectators. The British representative was Henry Whatley Tyler. Trials began on 28 February 1865. Only the first locomotive was available, but the trials were very successful. Captain Tyler came again in the spring when locomotive 2 had arrived. He found that some parts of this locomotive needed strengthening, and it would not be advisable to test it very much until replacements had been obtained. However, he did test it successfully. The trials gradually moved towards several runs on each day. On 19 July, they were observed by Frederick Hardman from the Times, and the French commissioners made the last of six visits. There were three more days of trials for the Italians and the Russians and a special day for James Brunlees on 31 July. This ended the official tests, but private testing continued until the end of November. The French concession was granted on 4 November 1865 and the Italian on 17 December.

== Mont Cenis Railway Company ==
On 7 February 1866, the Mont Cenis Railway Company (Limited) (MCR) was established as company 2820c under the Companies Act 1862. There were 12,500 shares of £20 each. For each share, £1 was to be paid on application and £3 on allotment, and further calls of £4 would be made at intervals of not less than three months.

The timing was very poor. In January 1866, the contractors Watson & Overend had failed with liabilities of £1½ million, and on 5 February, the railway promoter Thomas Savin failed.

The directors and other officers of the company were the Duke of Sutherland (President), Sir James Hudson (Chairman), Thomas Brassey, The Duke of Vallombrosa, Lord Abinger, Sir Morton Peto, Sir Robert Dallas, Edward Blount, Jervoise Smith, Thomas Crampton, W B Buddicom, Alexander Brogden, Fell, James Brunlees (Engineer), and T S Cutbill (Secretary). By October, Cutbill had been replaced by W.J.C. Cutbill.

On 11 May 1866, Overend, Gurney and Company failed. Samuel Morton Peto and Edward Betts also failed and their support was lost.

In August, the directors found that they each had to take up five more shares for the company to qualify for the London Stock Exchange. By 21 August, 8,678 shares had been taken up by 448 shareholders. Among these, Brassey took 945, Brogden 792, the Duke of Sutherland 542, Abinger 292, Brunlees 137, Crampton 237, and Fell 242.

== Construction ==
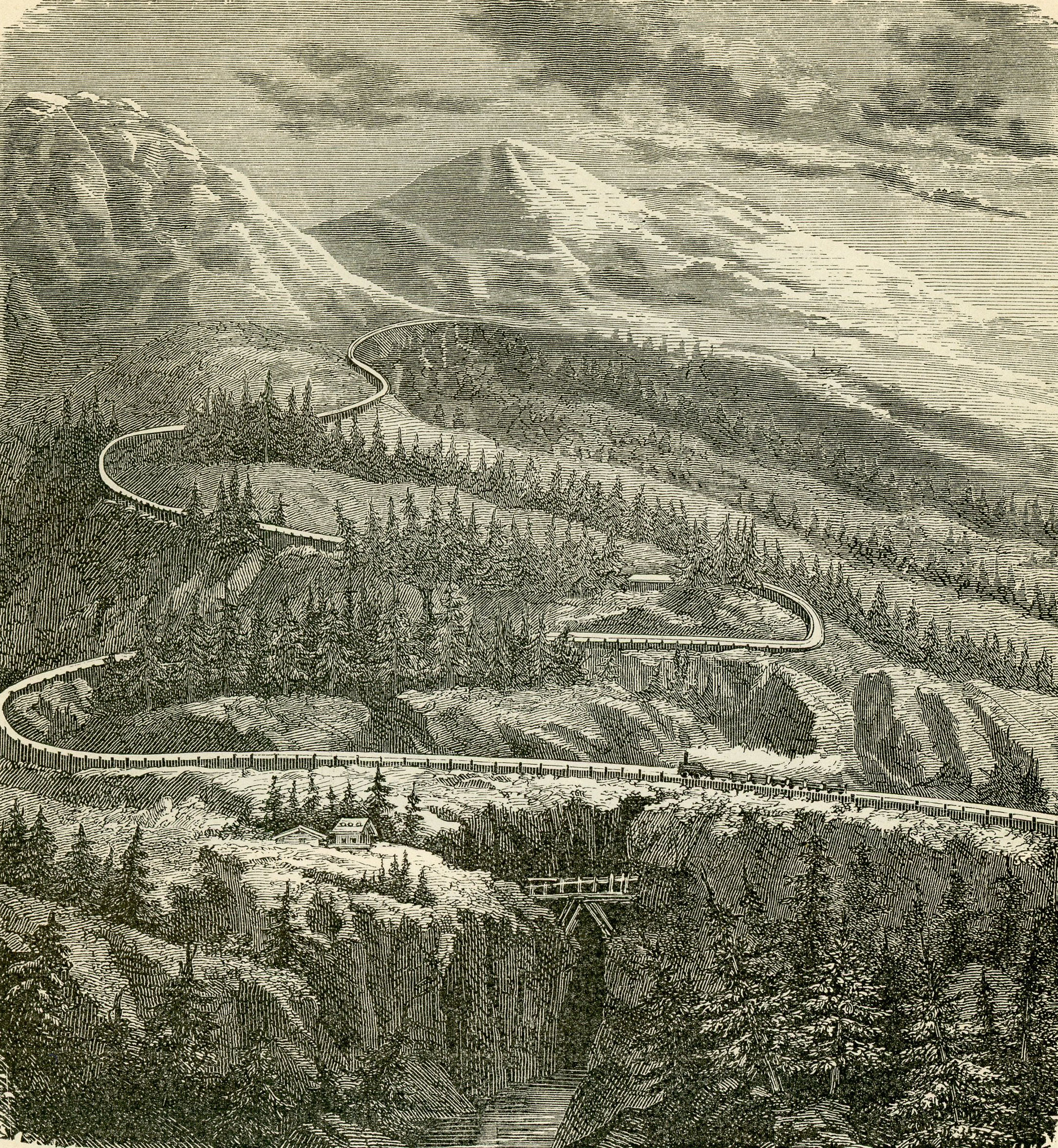
Woodcut from 1880 showing the terrain, with the railway and road following the same alignment

In early 1866, detailed plans and sections were drawn up for submission to governments. Construction began in March. The railway was to be 48 miles (77 km) long and would follow the existing roadway over the pass, although at villages, the railway had to leave the road and use a separate right-of-way. Where it was necessary for the track to cross the roadway on the level, the tall centre rail was lowered into a trough by the operation of a lever. Out of the 33-foot (10 m) standard width of the road, the company was allowed 13 feet (4 m) for track, with the governments retaining 20 feet (6 m) for roadway. There was a continuous wooden barrier separating the roadway from the rail track. Over a distance of 9 miles (14 km), the track had to run in snow shelters. Where avalanches were likely, these had to be built of masonry; elsewhere, they were of sheet iron. At some hairpin bends, adjustments had to be made to meet the railway's minimum radius of 130 feet (40 m). Much of the road was built on a shelf, and this had to be strengthened or widened in places. On the Italian side, the road had been built with a gentle slope. This had proved too prone to avalanches and had been replaced by a steep zig-zag called Les Échelles (the ladders), but the railway had to revert to the original roadway because the "ladders" were too severe for it. This section needed 660 yards (600 m) of masonry avalanche shelter. Using the Michelin map, the rise from St Michel is 4,492 feet (1,369 m) and from Susa 5,178 feet (1,578 m). J. B. Fell was appointed "Managing Director at the Mont Cenis". It seems that direct labour was employed on the French side, whereas on the Italian side, the contractor Gianoli & Canova was used.

== Locomotives ==
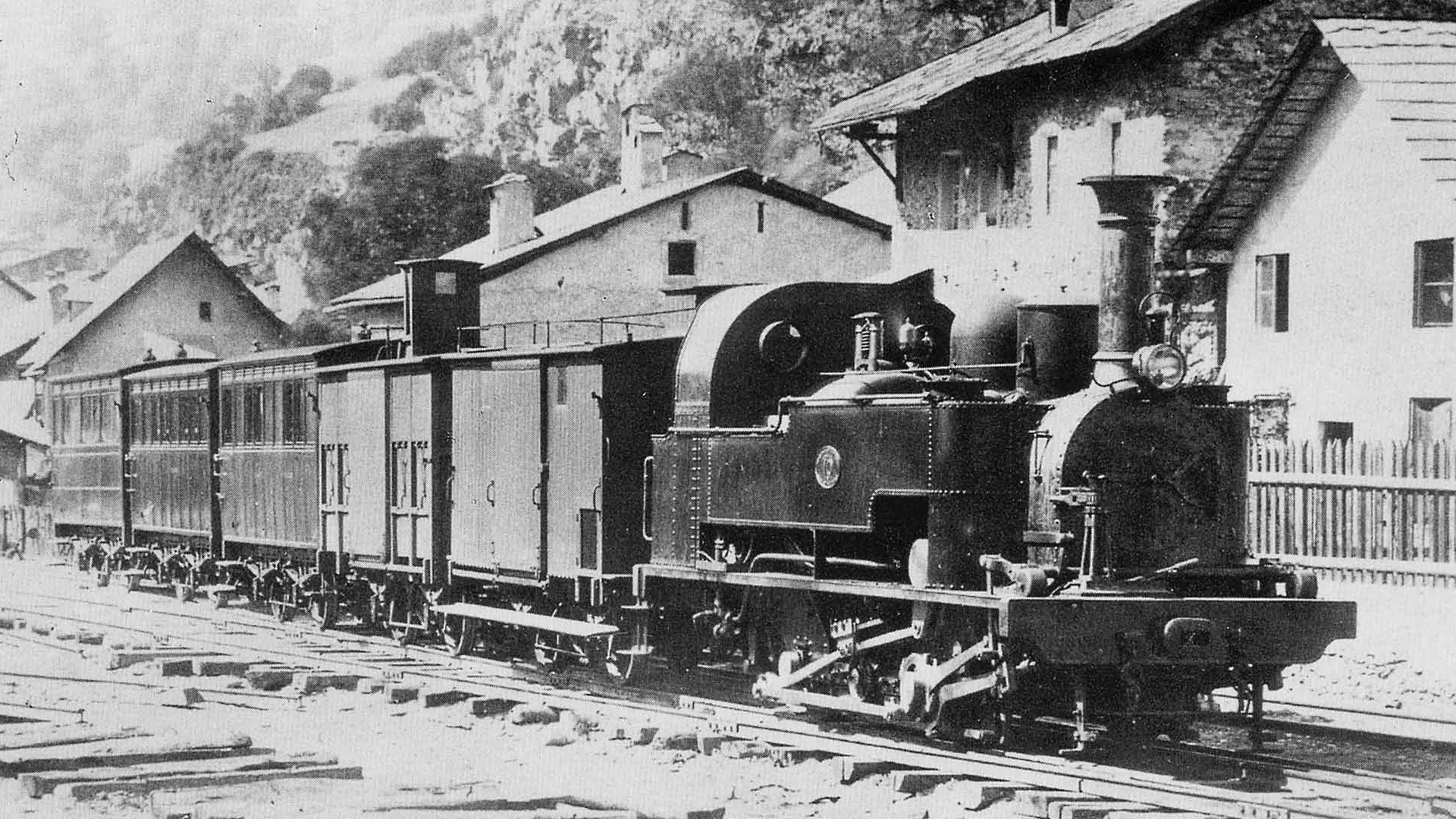
Fell system engine, with typical train of three passenger cars, a luggage van, and a guard's van with ducket

Fell had intended to have two classes of locomotives: one to pull heavy loads slowly up steep slopes from Lanslebourg and Susa, and one to run faster on easily-graded sections between Lanslebourg and St Michel. He was overruled by his co-directors. A. Alexander was appointed locomotive engineer, and Brassey's Canada Works had quoted to build the locomotives. After the first one was built, the directors discovered that French law prohibited importation of foreign machinery subject to a French patent. Fell had taken out at least one French patent. At this late stage, the most reputable French manufacturers were busy, so they used Ernest Goüin et Cie. of Paris, even though Alexander had reported on them unfavourably. In August, the locomotives were expected to be delivered in February, March, and April 1867. The locomotives were designed by Alexander, and his designs were passed by the board. The rolling stock was built by Chevalier, Cheilus & Cie of Paris.

== September 1866 ==
=== Visit report ===
At the beginning of September 1866, Abinger, Brogden, and Vallambrosa visited the works. They found 2,200 men employed, rails being laid at both ends and on the plateau of the line, and a scarcity of horses owing to the Austro-Italian war. On the French side, the stones forming the foundation of the road were so large that blasting was required to make holes for the fence. The locomotives might possibly be an issue. Otherwise nothing seemed likely to delay them.

=== Flood ===
It had been a cool summer, so the ice had not melted as much as usual. On 25 September, after a few days of warm rain, a tributary to the river Arc swept debris into the main river where it formed a dam, creating a reservoir. When this dam finally burst, there was a deluge that caused damage at fifty places between Termignon and St Michel.

Between Lanslebourg and Susa, all was well. The permanent way was nearly complete by early December, when snow stopped the work.

== February 1867 general meeting ==
On 19 February 1867, at the second half-yearly general meeting, shareholders were told that most of the line would be ready by May. On 4 March, Fell wrote to the board that he expected the line to open in September. On 4 April, the board were told that locomotive construction was well behind schedule. The first locomotive should be ready by 1 May, the second in June, and the remainder to follow at the rate of one per week. The first carriage was ready apart from its wheels.

== August 1867 ==
=== Board of Trade inspection ===
In mid-August, the Board of Trade dispatched Captain Tyler to inspect the railway and the tunnel. On the way, he inspected the locomotives and rolling stock under construction in Paris. On 22 August, the repairs between St Michel and Lanslebourg were incomplete. However, on 26 August, a test run was attempted. Two Goüin locomotives had been delivered but were not yet ready for service. So they had to use the second of the two British-built engines, built by James Cross at St Helens. Alexander Brogden was present. He wrote an account of the test to the Duke of Sutherland, which remains in the Duke's records and is quoted verbatim by Ransom. Everyone was nervous because there had been no previous test. However, the test was passed very well. Captain Tyler even composed a song. There were fifty people on the train, and Brunlees was the driver.

=== Inspection of tunnel ===
During the same visit, Brogden and Tyler investigated the tunnel. In the letter mentioned above, Brogden reported that progress was good. The tunnel should be pierced in three years and completed in four—much earlier than previously anticipated. Tyler's official report on the tunnel was that 7,366 metres had been bored, 4,884 remained, and that the French had passed through the hard quartz and returned to the softer schist. The link between the tunnel and the French railway was another matter. It would not begin for a year and would take another four years to complete.

== September 1867 French and Italian regulators ==
The company asked the French and Italian regulators to come to an inspection on 20 September, with a view to open for freight as soon as possible and open for passengers in October. They were optimistic. However, later in September, they had a successful private test using the No. 3 locomotive, the first from Goüin. In October, Brassey was touring his contracts. On the 12th, he arrived at Mont-Cenis expecting a successful test. It was a cold and wet day. The test was a disaster. Not only No. 3 but two other locomotives broke down in the attempt to complete the test. Brassey had to stand in the cold and wet, waiting for replacement engines. According to Helps, his biographer, Brassey developed a chill which led eventually to his death.

== November 1867 ==
=== General meeting ===
At a general meeting in November, shareholders were informed that Goüin had used inferior iron on the rocking shafts, rather than first-grade iron or forged steel as specified, and the shafts therefore had failed in the test. Also, the trailing axles could not accommodate the tight curves and would have to be removed. This meant that the rear driving wheels would need additional bearings and springs. On 17 April 1868, the Times reported that seven locomotives had had their shafts replaced or shortly would do.

=== Late delivery of rolling stock ===
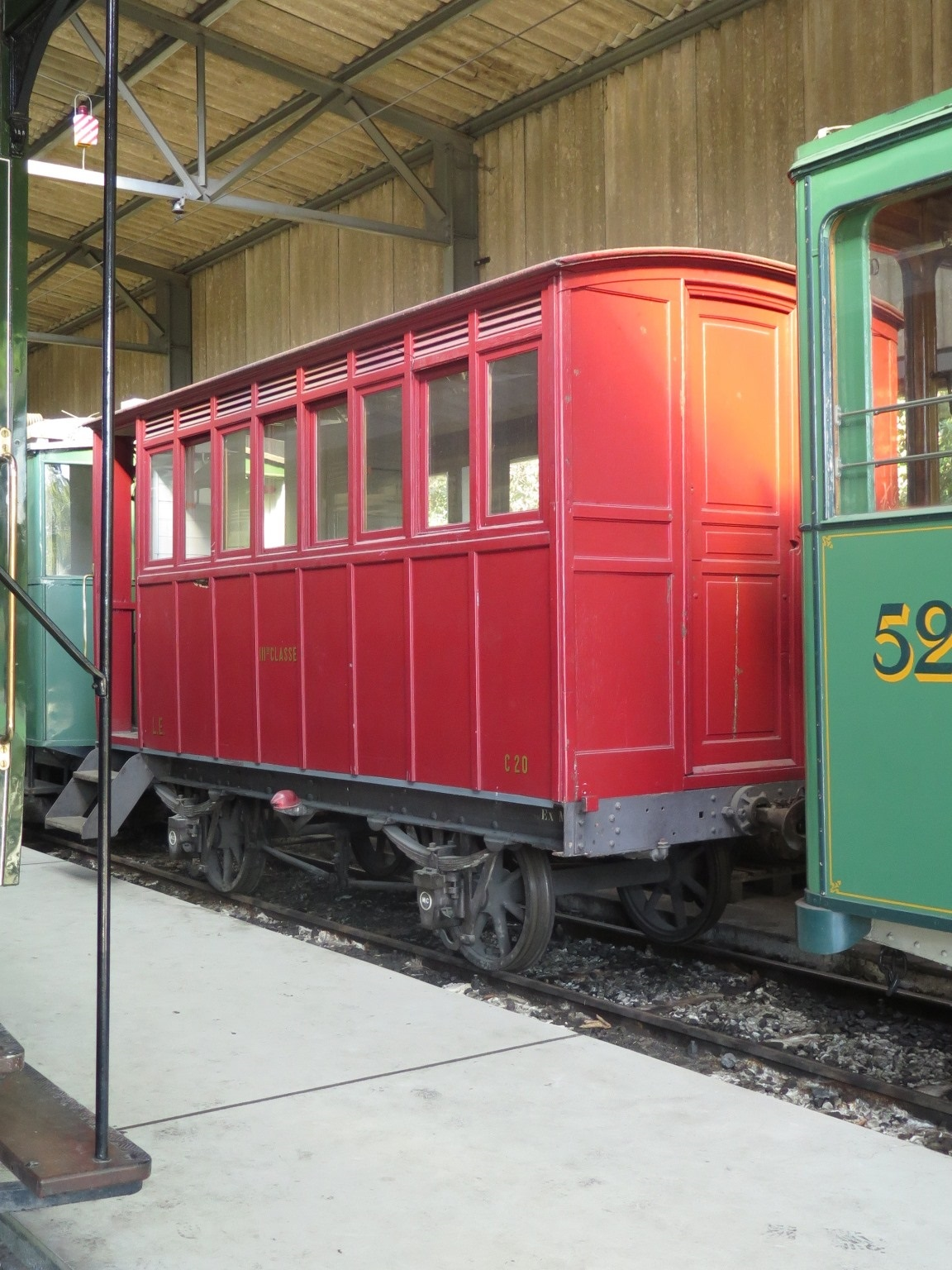
Mont Cenis Railway passenger car, preserved at the Blonay–Chamby Museum Railway

Chevalier were late in delivering the rolling stock. According to reports by Fell, Brogden, and Barnes, 103 wagons were already being erected at St Michel in August 1867, but by February 1868, the company had only 2 of 11 first-class carriages, 3 of 5 second-class, and 3 of 8 third-class, even though they were all due by the previous June. The delivered carriages were all four-wheelers, and the missing ones were six-wheelers. When the line opened in June 1868, The Engineer reported 7 first-class carriages, 4 second-class, and 8 third-class—officially a full complement, but not so according to the internal information. In 1870, Fell reported that, when the six-wheelers did arrive, they ran more steadily and with less resistance than the four-wheelers. (Brunlees specified that a sliding axle box designed by John Clark of the North London Railway was to be used for the six-wheelers, whereas the four-wheelers had ordinary axles.)

=== Financial problems ===
There were financial problems. In March 1867, the board agreed to seek a loan of £60,000 against guarantees by directors. On 12 September, The Times published an offering of £125,000 of 7% debentures, adding that the line would probably open in October. No applications were received. However, to keep things going, Brassey guaranteed £15,000 needed immediately.

A general meeting in November authorised an increase in the company's borrowing powers from £125,000 to £202,000 and an interest rate of 10%. Liabilities were stated to be £182,000. £150,000 had been raised by shares and only £2,600 by debentures. It was decided to issue £200,000 worth of bonds at 10%. The directors agreed to buy £150,000, provided the other shares subscribed £50,000. If this were not to happen within 14 days, then the works were liable to be sold in discharge of the liabilities. Later, more creditors were discovered, increasing the liabilities to £243,000. The company survived this crisis, although the bonds may not all have been sold.

=== Inspection ===
By November 1867, the line was complete except for the St Michel and Susa stations and part of the covered ways. Barnes was employing 25 men. They included 4 good engine drivers, all British, 6 fitters working on engines, 3 blacksmiths and strikers for points and crossings, one fitter, one smith, and one striker on wagon work. On 21 February, The Times reported that the line would open on 1 May, but once again it did not.

== Testing and final opening, April–June 1868 ==
On 20 April, after a lot of work, a test train carrying 25 tons was taken from St Michel to Susa, returning the following day. On the 23rd, another engine did the return journey within the day, taking 5 ½ hours to run the length, including one hour of stoppages. A Franco-Italian commission did a thorough check from 28 April to 2 May. They specified some interlocking, but otherwise gave permission to open for goods traffic immediately, with passenger traffic after 15 successful days of goods traffic.

The trial period was completed on 2 June. The promoters began to arrive in mid-May. At 11:30 on 23 May, they enjoyed a celebratory journey from Susa to St Michel. The party of 54 included Blount, Brogden, Buddicom, Fell, Cutbill, Bell, Blake, Alexander, Barnes, Gohierre, Desbrière, Crampton, Count Arrivabene, and Signor Milla, the Italian government commissioner. The Times and the Morning Post were represented. The public opening was announced for 8 June.

Once again it did not happen, but this time the problem was coordination with the main railways. The actual first passenger train ran from Susa at 7:20 am on 15 June 1868.

By 1 April, the tunnel boring amounted to 8,159 metres with 4,061 to go.

== The completed line ==
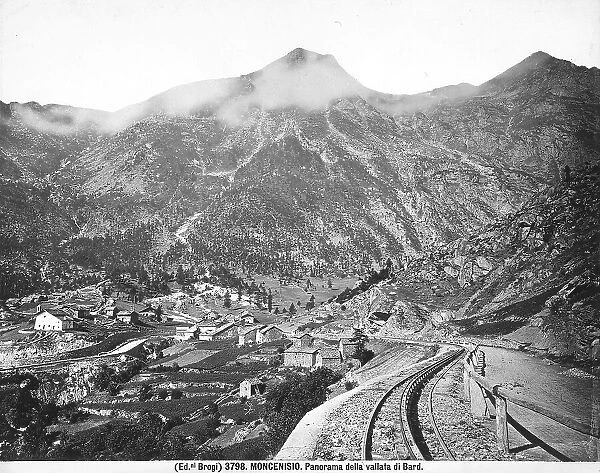
Photograph from 1870, showing separation between road and rail

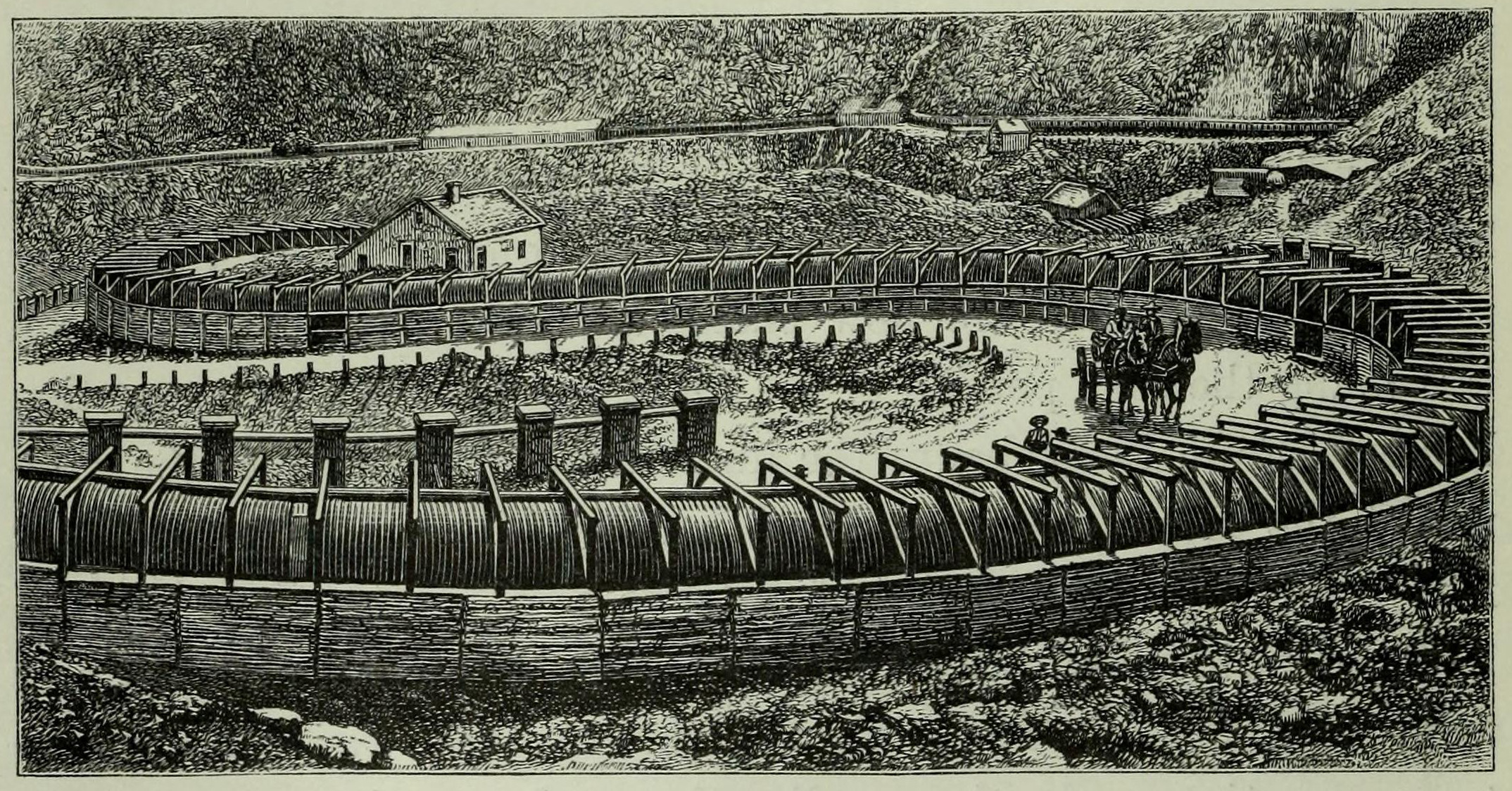
Section of line with a metal avalanche shed

The line had cost £392,000 to build, or £7,966 per mile. Brunlees had estimated £8,000 per mile. When passengers arrived at St Michel by the Paris-Lyon-Marseille (PLM) Railway, they had only to cross the platform to get onto the Fell railway train. Typically this had a Goüin locomotive, a guard's van, a goods van, and three coaches. The crew consisted of a driver, a fireman, a chief guard, and two brakesmen, one to each coach. There were no continuous brakes. The Westinghouse brake was patented in 1872.

Trains left Susa at 7:20 and 8:30. These trains arrived at St Michel at 11:45 and 12:55. The journey time was 5 hours 15 minutes because French time was 50 minutes behind Italian. The 8:30 train had a connection that left Turin at 5:30 am. Return trains left St Michel at 13:15 and 15:55.

On the opening day, the 7:20 comprised one 1st-, one 2nd-, and one 3rd-class coach, with two vans. The 8:30 coaches were all 1st-class, also with two vans. They both arrived slightly early.

Travel by the train saved 6 hours over the stagecoach; the coaches were more spacious and comfortable, and even the 1st-class fare was 20 francs cheaper. 29 passengers arrived by the PLM. 24 used the new train and 5 used the stagecoach. The stagecoach service declined, but in 1871, there was still one a day.

== Floods, August 1868 ==
Mail was carried from the start. From 1 August, the French, Italian, and MC Railways were coordinated so as to deliver mail a day earlier and book passengers right through, but on 10 August, a torrential storm washed away a length of road, leaving the rail suspended. Then on the night of 17/18 August, the Arc flooded again and washed away the Pont de la Denise, partly because of spoil left by tunnel builders for the standard railway. Footbridges were used to allow passengers to walk over the breaks.

The PLM line had been damaged between Saint-Michel-de-Maurienne and Saint-Jean-de-Maurienne.

The MCR was reopened in late September, but the PLM took longer, and stagecoaches were used between St Michel and St Jean for several more weeks. The PLM was glad of any excuse to divert its passengers from Mont Cenis to Marseille. However, the MCR was popular even when there were problems.

== General manager ==
At this time, there was no general manager on the spot, and the two principal officials Gohierre and Barnes did not get on. So the board appointed James Anderson Longridge (1817–1896), son of Michael Longridge, an associate of George Stephenson to whom James himself had been apprenticed. Once again, several locomotives required new cranks. More and better engines were needed, although the company could ill afford them.

== New locomotives ==
In August 1868, T.R. Crampton went to Mont Cenis to get Barnes’ approval on a new locomotive design. In mid-November, four engines were on order from Cail et Cie, a manufacturer who had built Crampton-designed engines for the French mainline companies in the 1850s. They were to be "hired on the deferred purchase principle" as the directors’ report put it.

== Snow blockage, November 1868 ==
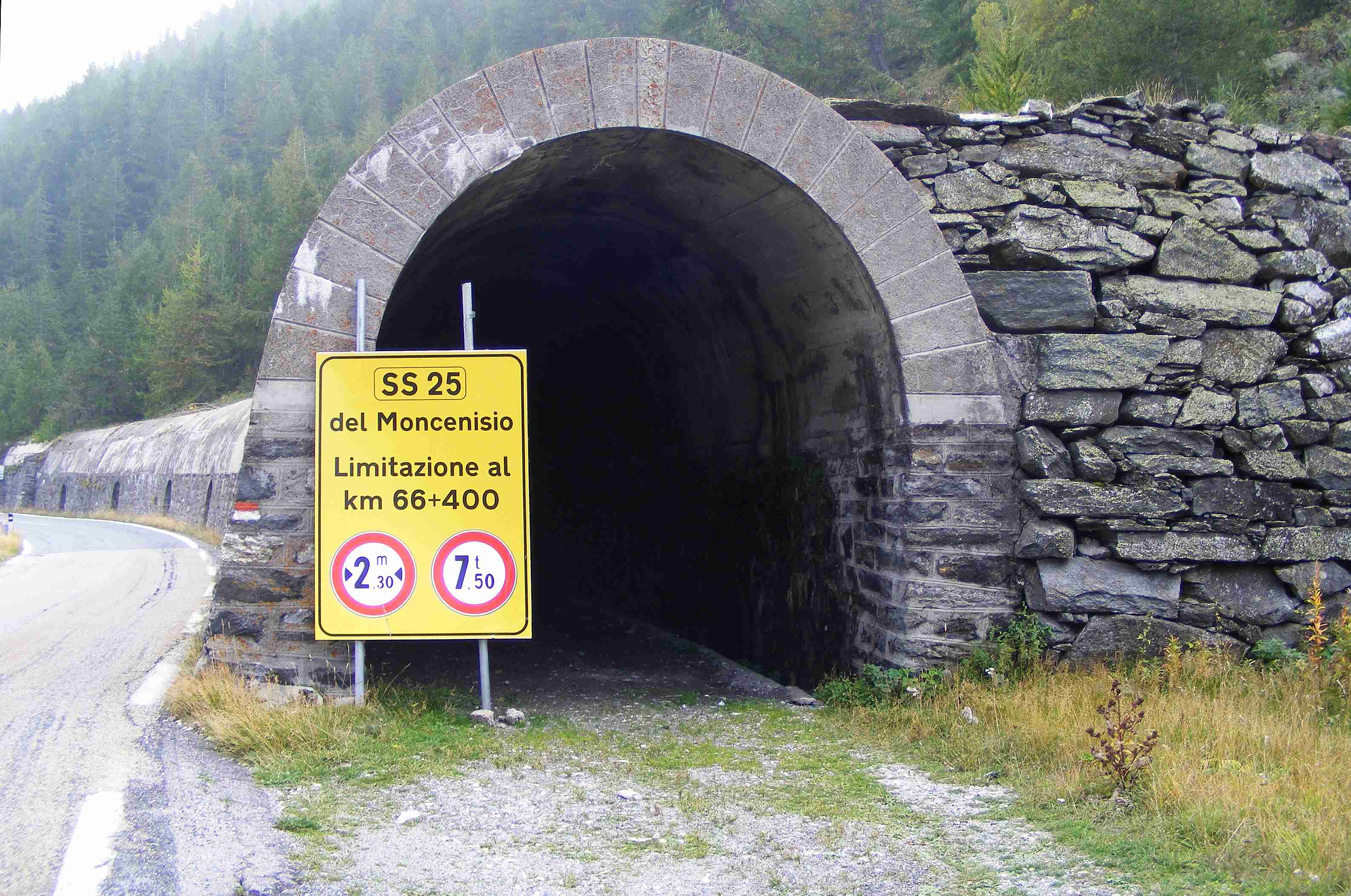
Remains of a roadside section with masonry avalanche shed

From 7 to 10 November 1868, there was a heavy fall of snow, and a locomotive broke down. The covered ways were still incomplete despite the pleas from Valentine Graeme Bell. This led to some delays, but only one train was cancelled. In March 1869, a train was blocked by snow drifts. The mail was carried on by sledge but also was overwhelmed by an avalanche. The driver escaped, but it took two days to recover the mail.

== General meeting, February 1869 ==
At a general meeting in February 1869, the operating accounts from 15 June to 31 October 1868 showed that the expenses were 73% of receipts. However, the Balance Sheet for 31 October 1868 showed shareholders' funds £155,550, debentures £180,750, loans £17,500, and creditors £65,487. Creditors in France had agreed to defer payment, secured against the operating profit. The likelihood of the shareholders getting their money back was slim. The Duke of Sutherland and Jervoise Smith resigned. The Duke, having presided over a failure, may have felt that honour required his resignation. Furthermore, he was chairman of the Sutherland Railway. This too had run out of funds after opening from Bonar Bridge to Golspie in April 1868. He himself funded the next section. Brassey kept in touch with the MCR and provided funds when the creditors got difficult.

== Further developments ==
In 1869, weekly receipts increased fairly steadily from £700 to £1700 before dropping to £1000 during the winter. Edward Whymper used the railway in 1869, and he describes the journey in his book Scrambles amongst the Alps. A test Indian Mail delivery was carried on 15 October. It arrived at Susa 67 minutes late, but the MCR clawed back 57 of them. It soon became a regular service.

The average speeds of trains were:

- St Michel and Lanslebourg: 13.2 mph both ways;
- Lanslebourg and La Frontière 7.9 mph upwards and 10.6 downwards;
- La Frontière and Susa 10.6 mph downwards and 6.6 upwards.

The Cail locomotives arrived in winter 1869/70. This enabled them to run freight trains on a regular basis. Traffic included coal and materials for the tunnel entrance at Bardonècchia. In the AGM on 10 February 1870, the board were unable to promise during 1870 to pay interest to bondholders or shareholders, as traffic was still below expectations.

In July 1870, there was a petition to wind up the company, and J. A. Longridge was appointed provisional liquidator. The railway continued to run, but trade was hampered by the Franco-Prussian War and the revolution in September. Paris was a major source of traffic, and the siege of Paris reduced traffic by two thirds.

The tunnel breakthrough took place on Christmas Day 1870. The first train ran through the tunnel on 16 September 1871. The tunnel service started on 16 October 1871, and the MCR service ended on the previous day. The MCR began to run at a loss in 1871. They applied to the Italian government for a subsidy, but this was refused. At the same time, they could not stop the service because of the concession agreement.

== Review ==
During the life of the railway, no passenger met with an accident, but in December 1869, two men were killed when a freight train was derailed, and in 1868, an employee was thrown from a train and killed. In September 1870, Fell reported to the British Association that trains had travelled 200,000 miles and carried 100,000 passengers, the Indian Mail had never missed a connection and had taken 30 hours less than before, and the journey time from Paris to Turin had been cut by one night. The MCR had proved the value of Fell's new system.

After the line was closed, Longridge worked out that the total train-miles were 345,500. Working expenses per train-mile were 9s. 8½d, of which locomotives cost 4s 0d. Receipts were 11s 9½d

When Fell gave a paper to the British Association in 1870, the impressive progress of the tunnel led him to predict correctly that it would open before the end of 1871. The Cantagalo railway was already under construction. Central-rail railways were being mooted in India, Switzerland, Spain, and additional railways in France and Italy.

After the Mont Cenis Railway closed, much of its material and some staff went to the Cantagalo railway, in Brazil, and the Lausanne-Echallens railway, in Switzerland. Records in the Public Record Office do not show how the proceeds were shared among the creditors or whether the shareholders got any of their investment back. Longridge retired in 1881 and died in 1896. If he completed the liquidation, he did not report it to the Companies Office.

== Other Fell railways ==
Once the railway was opened, Fell rapidly moved on to develop the Cantagalo railway, near Rio de Janeiro in Brazil. It ran from Niterói to Nova Friburgo. It re-used some of the equipment from the Mont Cenis Pass Railway, and was to the same gauge of 1,100 mm (3 ft 7 5/16 in). It opened in 1873 as Brazil's first mountain railway, and operated until the 1960s.

The steepest gradient was 1 in 11 (9.09%) and the sharpest curve 1.4 chains (92.40 ft; 28.16 m). With these sharp curves, the rigidly fixed horizontal wheels did not readily follow irregularities in the centre rail. Fractures were frequent. In 1883, powerful conventional 0-6-0Ts from Baldwin replaced the Fell engines. However, the central rail was still used for braking.

The Fell system was successfully applied to the Rimutaka Incline in New Zealand.

== See also ==
- Culoz–Modane railway
- Fell Mountain railway system
- Mont Cenis Tunnel
- Turin–Modane railway
- Victor Emmanuel Railway
- s:Scrambles amongst the Alps/Chapter 3, a detailed description by Edward Whymper
