= James Brogden (industrialist) =

British businessman (1832–1907)

James Brogden (7 April 1832 – 26 January 1907) was a British businessman, the fourth son of John Brogden (1798–1869) of Manchester. He spent most of his adult life in Mid Glamorgan, first at Tondu and later at Porthcawl. He was the junior partner in John Brogden and Sons.

In 1853/4, Brogdens bought the iron and coal mining business at Tondu, Mid-Glamorgan of Sir Robert Price, 2nd Baronet. Price had got into difficulties during recessions in the iron trade in the 1840s. In February 1854, John Brogden sent his son James, then aged 22, to revive and run the business, which was very run down. In July 1854, John Brogden signed a new 99-year lease with Jane Nicholl. James rapidly reorganised the works and established his home at Tondu House, which he rebuilt. In the 1861 census, James said he was employing 900 men and farming 1,100 acres (4.5 km^{2}) with 20 men.

In September 1859, James married Helen Dunbar Milne, a granddaughter of Lady Helen Dunbar of Tunbridge Wells, in St George's, Hanover Square. At first, the marriage was happy but in February 1864 an affair began between Helen and John Popkin Traherne, who lived at nearby Coytrahen House. Brogden petitioned for a divorce in February 1865 and this was granted.

When John Brogden Senior died in December 1869, Alexander assumed his father’s position as head of John Brogden and Sons and came to Tondu to assume control. He took a lease on Coytrahen House – where Mrs Brogden had committed adultery - even though James had offered to vacate Tondu House for his use. This hurt James terribly and created a rift, which was bad for both the family and the business because it was hard for the two men to maintain cordial relations.

James went out to New Zealand on behalf of the family firm to negotiate the contracts with the government to build railways using emigrants from the UK. He left Liverpool in August 1871 and returned to England early in 1873. The diary that he kept during his journey shows that he was engaged in very difficult and protracted negotiations. It runs to over 100 pages of manuscript and offers a very readable account of the places he visited and the people he met.

James's companions on this journey were: "Dunny" (his son Duncan Dunbar Milne Brogden), "Fielding" (his servant) and "Llewellyn" (a friend). By "Llewellyn" he almost certainly meant Robert William Llewellyn (1849-1910). This gentleman was at the right age for such an adventure. He later inherited Baglan Hall and Court Colman Manor and Court Colman is close to Tondu.

In 1874 shortly after his return, James married as his second wife Mary Caroline Beete, daughter of John Picton Beete, a nephew of Gen. Sir Thomas Picton. While James was in New Zealand, Alexander had taken control of the South Wales business, forming a new company, the Llynvi, Tondu and Ogmore Coal and Iron Company. As he was no longer required at Tondu, James made his new home in Porthcawl.

After the dissolution of John Brogden and Sons, Mrs Brogden purchased approximately 30 acres (120,000 m^{2}) adjoining the new Porthcawl dock that her husband had bought for the company in 1865, and by the end of the century, she had developed the early stages of the modern town of Porthcawl. In 1906, however, the Great Western Railway that then owned the dock, closed it because its trade had been diverted to newer docks at Port Talbot and Barry. This reduced the value of her properties, which were heavily mortgaged. This hastened James's death, which occurred at his home, the Esplanade Hotel, on 25 January 1907.

Afterwards, most of Mrs Brogden’s property had to be sold and she moved to 72 Victoria Avenue where she died on 5 November 1927. .
