= James Brunlees =

Scottish civil engineer (1816 – 1892)

Sir James Brunlees
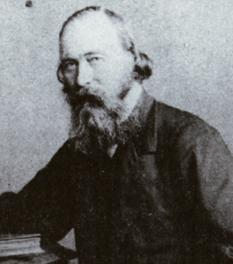
- Sir James Brunlees
- Born: 1816; Kelso, Scottish Borders, Scotland
- Died: 1892 (aged 75–76); Wimbledon, London
- Education: University of Edinburgh
- Spouse: Elizabeth Kirkman (1845)
- Parent(s): John Brunlees, Margaret Rutherford
- Engineering career
- Discipline: Civil
- Institutions: Fellow of the Royal Society of Edinburgh, Institution of Civil Engineers (president)

Sir James Brunlees FRSE MICE (1816 – 1892) was a Scottish civil engineer. He was president of the Institution of Civil Engineers for 1882–83.

He was born in Kelso in the Scottish Borders in 1816.

== Early life ==
Brunlees was the son of John Brunlees, the gardener of the Duke of Roxburghe's agent, and Margaret Rutherford.

As a youth he assisted the surveyor Alexander Adie in surveying the roads on the Duke's estates and decided to be a civil engineer. He studied at Edinburgh University, then worked on the Bolton and Preston Railway under Adie before working on various railways in Scotland and Northern England in a staff of engineers.

== Career ==
=== Londonderry and Coleraine Railway ===
In 1850, Brunlees worked on the Londonderry and Coleraine Railway. For this job he was obliged to build an embankment over Rosse’s Bay on the River Foyle, surmounting great difficulties.

=== Railway across Morecambe Bay ===
Brunlees was the construction engineer for the Ulverston and Lancaster Railway. This was a short but difficult and important railway to link the Furness Railway network to the Lancaster and Carlisle Railway line and thence to all points further south in the British network. The route was planned by McClean and Stileman at 19 miles in length, of which ten miles comprised embankments and viaducts across tidal water. Much of this was sand running to a depth of 30 to 70 feet. This made it very challenging to build. In business terms the Manchester-based railway contractors John Brogden and Sons were the prime movers of this railway.

The Ulverstone and Lancaster Railway Act received the Royal Assent on 24 July 1851, but work was not in full progress until September 1853 because workers and accommodation for them were not readily available. McClean and Stileman had resigned as engineers in the previous February so another engineer had to supervise construction. Brunlees was chosen because of his success with the River Foyle project.

The line was opened on 26 August 1857. Brunlees wrote a paper on this project for the Institution of Civil Engineers in which he described the design profile of the embankments and a novel design of drawbridge for the viaducts to withstand the winds and waves. His work on the U&L earned him praise from Joseph Locke and John Hawkshaw. Viaducts were built across the estuaries of the rivers Kent and Leven. These were designed and built by W & J Galloway & Sons of Manchester using a novel piling system involving waterjets. Later, they worked together on Southport Pier using a similar system.

=== Railway across the Solway Firth ===
Brunlees was the engineer of the Solway Junction Railway. This involved a 1 mile 8 chains (1.8 km) cast-iron girder viaduct between Bowness-on-Solway and Annan across the Solway Firth in Scotland. It had 193 spans, with 2,892 tons of cast iron for the piles, and 1,807 tons of wrought iron. The Act of Parliament was passed in 1864 and the railway was opened in 1869.

In 1875 and 1881, the viaduct was damaged by ice. In 1881 the damage was severe and there was a Board of Trade Inquiry. The inspecting officer said that because of the thickness of the ice, the size of the ice floes, and the absence of wind, it was not surprising that the cast-iron columns had not withstood the shock. This method of construction should be avoided in estuaries where the climate was subject to sudden changes in temperature and to blows from floating ice. He had no objection to rebuilding the viaduct but recommended modifications to prevent a repetition. He did not criticise anyone, however, perhaps because this type of engineering was new and everyone was learning.

=== São Paulo, Brazil ===
Brunlees became engineer of the São Paulo Railway in 1856, with D. M. Fox as assistant. They used cable haulage on a 5 ft 3 in (1,600 mm) gauge railway. They used four inclined planes at a gradient of 1 in 9.75 to surmount a 2,650 foot escarpment. The line was completed in 1867.

In 1873, he was awarded the Order of the Rose.

=== Other work ===
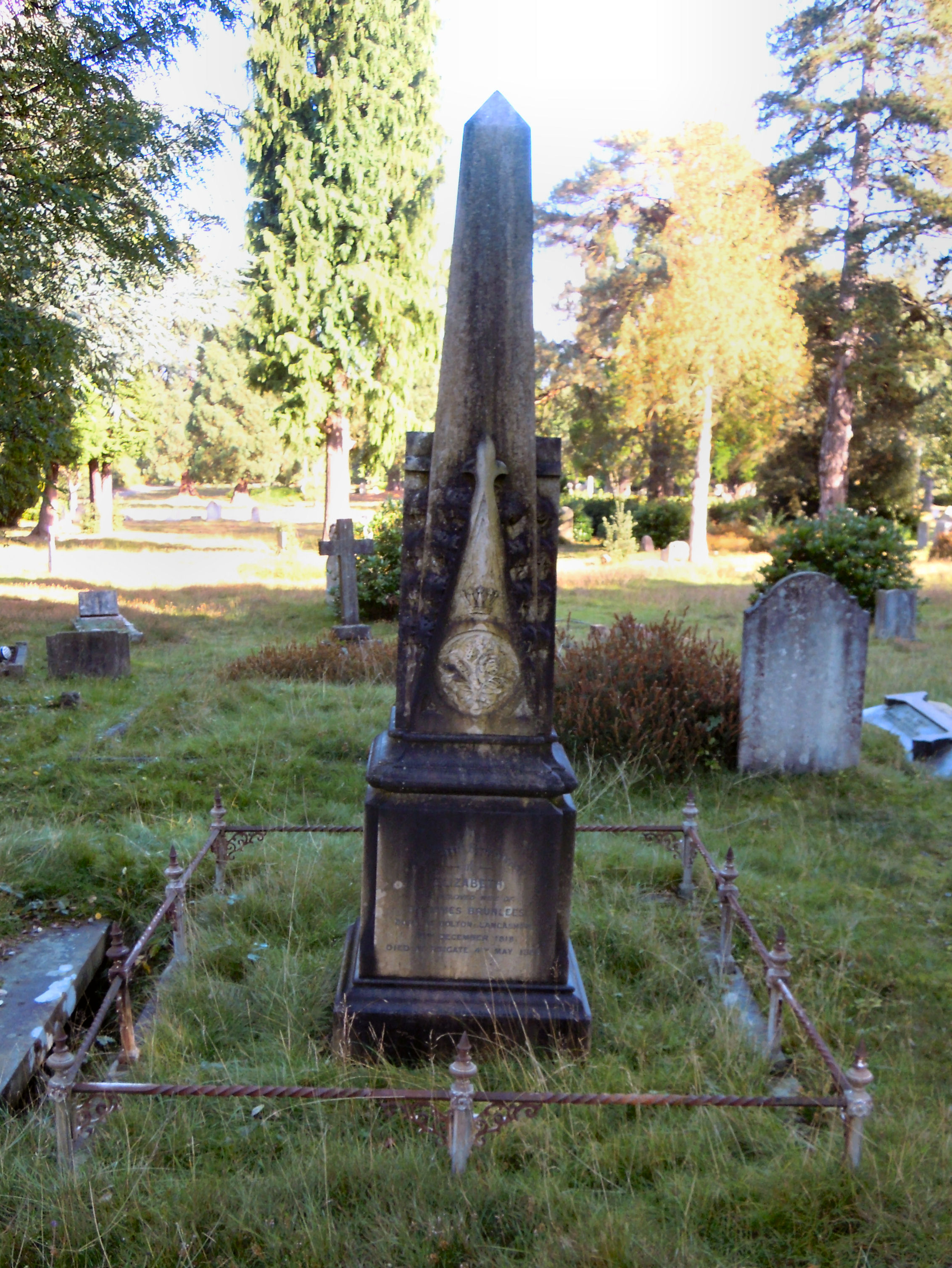
Brunlees' grave in Brookwood Cemetery

Brunlees served as a railway engineer in the construction of the Mersey Railway, connecting Liverpool and Birkenhead, and designed bridges such as the Upleatham and Kilton Viaduct's. He also worked in maritime engineering and was responsible for the construction of the docks at Avonmouth and Whitehaven as well as the piers at Southport and Southend. He was the engineer of the 3 ft gauge Gorseddau Tramway at Portmadoc.

Brunlees was engineer, as well as one of the leading shareholders and directors, of the Mont Cenis Pass Railway, active mainly during planning and construction, from 1864 to 1868. There is evidence that Brunlees also worked with the Brogdens on their New Zealand projects. He served as president of the Institution of Civil Engineers between December 1882 and December 1883.

He was knighted in 1886.

Brunlees died at Argyle Lodge in Wimbledon, London on 2 June 1892, and was buried in Brookwood Cemetery.

== Family ==
Brunlees married Elizabeth Kirkman in 1845.

Professional and academic associations
Preceded by William George Armstrong	President of the Institution of Civil Engineers; December 1882 – December 1883	Succeeded by Joseph Bazalgette
