= Brogden (avocado) =

Avocado cultivar

Persea americana 'Brogden'
- Genus: Persea
- Species: Persea americana
- Cultivar: 'Brogden'
- Breeder: Tom W. Brogden
- Origin: First grown in Winter Haven, Florida, in the 1930s; recognized by Florida State Horticultural Society in 1951.

The Brogden (or Brogdon) avocado is a named cultivar of avocado that originated in Florida.

== History ==
The original tree grew from a seed planted in the grove of Tom W. Brogden of Winter Haven, Florida, in the 1930s. 'Brogden' may have been the result of a cross between Mexican-type and West Indian-type cultivars.

'Brogden' first received attention when a seedling of it was reputed to survive the winter in North Carolina. The cultivar's name was published by the Florida State Horticultural Society in 1951, and it became recognized for its cold hardiness, unique dark-purple skin color, and superior flavor. Though it had no major commercial potential due to its thin skin, 'Brogden' was recommended for home growing in areas of Florida where avocados needed to be more cold hardy than most to survive.

Today 'Brogden' trees are still propagated and sold as nursery stock, both in Florida and in other states where avocados can be grown. 'Brogden' trees are planted in the collections of the University of Florida's Tropical Research and Education Center in Homestead, Florida, as well as the Miami-Dade Fruit and Spice Park, also in Homestead.

== Description ==
'Brogden' trees produce B-type flowers. The fruit is shaped like a pear, and averages just under a pound in weight. The flavor is rich and nutty, somewhat like Hass. The skin is thin and has a dark-purple color at maturity (often described as black). Fruit production is average compared to most avocado varieties, and the fruit typically matures from July to September in Florida.
