= Henry Brogden =

British businessman

Henry Brogden (30 September 1828 – 21 June 1913) was born in Manchester, the third son of John Brogden. He was educated at King's College, London and spent a year at the locomotive works of George Stephenson, Newcastle-on-Tyne. He enjoyed engineering shop work and kept a very complete workshop at home. When he was old enough he became a partner in his father’s firm John Brogden and Sons. He played a full part in the direction of their many contracts and business interests. However whereas his elder brother Alexander Brogden seems to have been a very outgoing man, was elected as an MP and led the firm into many ventures, lawsuits and eventually into bankruptcy, Henry comes across as quieter, more studious and perhaps more careful. He is hard to find in literature.

Henry Brogden is said to have been the engineer of the Stockport Viaduct, as well Brogden’s own railways, collieries and ironworks in South Wales.

Brogden was a Fellow of the Geological Society and a Member of the Institution of Mechanical Engineers.

In the 1860s, Henry bought Hale Lodge, Hale then in Cheshire, from the Rev. Charles Wallace. After the failure of John Brogden and Sons in 1880, Henry Brogden continued to live at Hale Lodge. whereas Alexander was forced to leave his substantial home near Ulverston. Henry died at Hale Lodge in 1913.

At the time Hale Lodge (built 1808, demolished 1950s) was the largest house in Hale.
