= John Brogden and Sons =

Defunct British railway contractors

- Type: Private company
- Industry: Contracting, Iron, Coal
- Founded: 1828
- Defunct: 1880
- Fate: Bankrupt
- Headquarters: London, England, United Kingdom

John Brogden and Sons was a firm of Railway Contractors, Iron and Coal Miners and Iron Smelters operating, initially as a general contractor, from roughly 1828 until its bankruptcy in 1880.

== Formation ==
The business started in the 1820s when John Brogden (1798–1869) moved from his father's farm near Clitheroe to set up in business in the rapidly expanding Manchester (not yet a city). In 1828 he appears in the Manchester Directory in Every Street, Ancoats as a farmer, in 1829 at the same address as a horse-dealer.

In 1832 he successfully tendered for a contract with the local council (the Bororeeve) to undertake the cleansing and watering of Manchester. Around this time he obtained a similar contract in London. In 1843, as a partner of Joseph Whitworth (later Sir Joseph), he contracted to sweep the streets of Manchester with Whitworth's patent machines. They undertook a similar contract in Westminster.

In 1844 Brogden moved to London because the focus of his interests had moved to there.

Many Brogden contracts were financed and supported by Samuel Brooks of Cunliffe, Brooks & Co. They became acquainted during early life in North Lancashire and this relationship was renewed in Manchester. Brooks was vice-chairman of the Manchester and Leeds Railway so he was also well placed to help Brogden gain early railway contracts.

== First railway contracts ==
In July 1838 Brogden obtained a contract on the Manchester and Birmingham Railway (M&BR) and in August 1840 two more contracts jointly with Easthed.

In 1842 Brogden secured contracts with the Manchester and Leeds Railway to build a viaduct between the existing station at Oldham Road and Hunts Bank. Then in March 1843 he gained the contract for the new station at Hunts Bank. This was opened on New Years Day 1844 under the name Manchester Victoria station. The Liverpool and Manchester Railway started using this station in the following May.

In October 1845 he obtained a contract to build the Ashton Branch of the M&BR (Heaton Norris to Guide Bridge). He obtained contracts with the East Lancashire Railway to build from Stubbins to Accrington in 1845 and Blackburn to Hapton in 1846 (jointly with Smith and Pearce).

In 1846 Brogden became a director of the South Eastern Railway Company and John Brogden junior obtained contracts from that company for the North Kent Railway in November 1846 and February 1847.

The Manchester South Junction and Altrincham Railway received its act of Parliament, the Manchester South Junction and Altrincham Railway Act 1845 (8 & 9 Vict. c. cxi). It had two sections: from London Road Station to Knott Mill and the second from there to Altrincham. Brogdens had the contract for the second section. Samuel Brooks persuaded the company to build what we now know as Brooklands station, providing a guarantee of receipts for the first three years. He owned the land there and expected the station to help with its development. Marsland Road (the A6144) crosses the railway at this point before reaching Washway Road (A56). Just at the junction of these two roads are Brogden Grove and Brogden Terrace, with Victorian terrace houses on them. It is likely that Brooks sold or leased this land to Brogden at a favourable rate and Brogden built these houses on it. In turn the houses helped to justify the station and launch Brooklands as a place to live. Nearby Brogden built Raglan House, Raglan Road to be their new home. In short, an alliance between Brooks and Brogden.

Brogden was joined in his business by his four eldest sons: John, Alexander, Henry and James as they reached the age of majority. His youngest son, George was never involved as he was too young.

== Work in Cumbria ==
=== Ulverstone and Lancaster Railway ===
In the late 1840s the Brogdens became interested in iron ore mining in the Furness area of North Lancashire (now Cumbria). In 1846 John senior became a shareholder of the Furness Railway. They took ore-mining territory at Stainton in the estate of the Earl of Burlington and were developing mines there by December 1850. In 1850 the second largest haematite ore deposit in British history was discovered by Schneider and Co. at Park, on the Duddon shore in Furness. By 1855, in addition to Stainton, Brogdens had mines at Adgarley and Bolton Heads. Mining capacity was growing fast. This ore was sent to market via the Furness Railway and then by ship.

George Stephenson had planned a West Coast main Line to cross the mouth of Morecambe Bay and this would have linked Furness with the developing national rail network. However this plan was shelved in 1843. The Lancaster and Carlisle Railway Act 1844 (7 & 8 Vict. c. xxxvi) was passed on 6 June 1844, establishing this as the route for the main line. Instead of Furness becoming part of the national rail strategy, it was now a backwater. It could only be connected to the main network by local efforts and these would involve crossing Morecambe Bay, with its notorious tidal quicksands. The Furness Railway directors collectively, led by Burlington, were not keen to take responsibility for this risky project although the Lancaster and Carlisle Railway was considering it.

In 1847, a group led by Brogden and his three eldest sons began to promote a rail link between Ulverston and Carnforth, on the Lancaster–Carlisle line and they eventually obtained the Ulverstone and Lancaster Railway Act 1851 (14 & 15 Vict. c. cii), given royal assent on 24 July 1851. The directors were: John (sen.) John (jun.) Alexander, Henry, James Garstang (Alexander's father-in-law) and Joseph (later Sir Joseph) Paxton. The line was planned by McClean and Stileman at 19 miles (31 km) in length of which 10 miles (16 km) comprised embankments and viaducts across tidal water. Much of this was sand running to a depth of 30 to 70 feet (21 m).

Work on the line was not in full progress until September 1853. McClean and Stileman had resigned as engineers the previous February and were replaced by James Brunlees. The viaducts over the Kent and Leven were designed and built by W & J Galloway & Sons of Manchester. Brunlees had already completed a similar project and went on to achieve great eminence. He worked again with Brogdens on: the Solway Junction Railway, the Mont Cenis Pass Railway and New Zealand railways. He worked again with the Galloways on Southport Pier.

In 1851 Brogdens had been poised to take over the Furness Railway itself and a draft agreement was made between Burlington and John Brogden senior but the Furness Railway directors refused to ratify it. Thus Burlington's fellow directors saved him and his family from losing a great prize and prevented the Brogdens from gaining it. However, as the expensive work proceeded Brogdens ran short of money and had to ask the Furness Railway for financial assistance. As the FR legally could not do this, two of their directors made a loan of £50,000 in their personal capacities.

The line was opened on 26 August 1857. Gross expenditure was over £410,000. Brogdens were struggling financially and in 1858 approached the Furness for another loan but declined to accept the stringent conditions demanded. Finally in 1862 Brogdens sold the U&L to the existing Furness Railway having made little or no direct profit. This railway link however was critical to the later industrial development of Barrow-in-Furness and its locality and mining interests. It also caused silt to build up in former tidal areas, creating new agricultural land. Brogdens' decision to sell this valuable railway, with good growth prospects, suggests that they were short of cash.

=== Solway Junction Railway ===
Alexander Brogden was chairman of the Solway Junction Railway so they clearly had a substantial stake in that railway but their precise involvement is not clear. For this railway the Solway Junction Railway Act 1864 (27 & 28 Vict. c. clxxxvi) was passed and the railway was opened in 1869 (goods only) and 1870 (goods and passengers). James Brunlees, previously noted, was the engineer. It was a failure in the long run because the cast iron viaduct could not withstand the ice-floes which were a regular feature of the winters here.

== Work in south Wales ==
Another area of expansion was in Mid-Glamorgan in south Wales. The bulk of iron ore mined in Furness had been sent there and the Brogdens became aware that Sir Robert Price, the owner of the Glamorgan Iron and Coal Works at Tondu, was in difficulties. In December 1853 they purchased for £10,000 the leases of the land and mines that he held. In the following January they purchased the works itself for £35,000. In July they acquired the leases of other farms and mines previously held by Sir Robert.

These purchases took place only a short time before the Bessemer process (announced 1856) began to undercut the old iron-making processes. That was bad luck but possibly they should have observed the Bessemer process more carefully before expanding the factory especially as Galloways, who supplied the bridges for the Ulverston and Lancaster Railway, were key players in the development of the Bessemer process.

=== Llynvi Valley / Cwm Llynfi ===
These purchases were put under the control of James Brogden who was then at 22 the junior partner. He made good progress. In 1859 he married Helen Dunbar Milne. This marriage was unhappy and was dissolved in 1865.

When the horse-drawn Duffryn Llynvi and Porthcawl Railway was replaced by the steam-hauled broad gauge Llynvi Valley Railway in 1861, the prospects of the Tondu and Maesteg areas improved and in 1863 Brogdens obtained a new lease of the Tywith lands in the Llynfi valley, from which they raised coal and iron in large quantities.

Tywith is very close to Coegnant and later there was a court case in which Brogdens were alleged to have extended their mine into Coegnant's territory (see below).

In 1864 they leased the Garth land, sank the Garth pit and erected coke-ovens, which they worked until the depression in 1877 forced their closure. Richards (1982) says (re Garth Colliery, 1864):

"J. Brogden & Sons bought Garth Fach and Cwmdu Canol Farms and sank this pit in 1865. The sinking operations were supervised by James Barrow, who was later President of the South Wales Institute of Engineers. He was also mineral agent to the Margam Estate. In 1867 there was an explosion but no-one was hurt. It resulted in the closure of the colliery for a year. About 1880 the pit was idle for another year but in 1882 it was sunk to a depth of 250 yards, 3 seams being worked. In addition there were 60 coke ovens producing 1,000 tons of coke weekly. It was after the sinking of Oakwood and Garth Pits that the village of Garth developed. Garth Pit closed in 1930 when it employed 616 men."

=== Ogmore Valley / Cwm Ogwr ===
The Brogdens also worked the Ogmore valley, first at the top of the valley but in 1865 they sank the Wyndham pit and opened the Tynewydd level. They worked both of these until 1872 when a new joint stock company was formed. In July 1863 they obtained the Ogmore Valley Railways Act 1863 (26 & 27 Vict. c. cxxxix) for the Ogmore Valley Railway of which Alexander became the chairman. This was a standard-gauge railway from Nantymoel at the head of the valley to a junction with the Llynvi Valley Railway (Broad gauge) at Tondu. They also gained power to lay a third rail along the Llynvi Valley line from Tondu to Porthcawl.

=== Aberdare ===
The Bwllfa Dare No. 1 Pit was opened in 1856 by E Lewis and worked by the Byllfa Colliery Co. Ltd., then Brogdens and then the Bwllfa and Merthyr Dare Steam Coal Collieries Ltd. There seem to have been two Bwllfa and Merthyr Dare companies. The first was founded in November 1876 to purchase the lease from Brogdens. George, the only Brogden son not to be a partner in John Brogden and Sons, was connected with this first Bwllfa-Merthyr company. It seems to have been reorganised in 1881. On 17 April 1890 a meeting was held at the pit head, attended by about 700 colliers, at which George was presented with an illuminated address and described as the proprietor.

=== Porthcawl ===
The decision to build standard gauge in a broad gauge area prevented them from sending their coal either to Cardiff (via Stormy) or Blackmill via the Ely Valley Extension Railway. They therefore decided to build a new port at Porthcawl as the old tidal dock was unsatisfactory.

They obtained the co-operation of the Llynfi company and jointly obtained the Llynvi and Ogmore Railways Act 1864 (27 & 28 Vict. c. xlviii) in June 1864. This included the new dock, to be run jointly by the two companies. This covered 7 1/2 acres, had 2,300 ft (700 m). wharfage, four high level loading stages and a capacity of 5,000 tons of coal per day. It cost £250,000. In July 1866 the Lynvi and Ogmore companies were amalgamated to make the Llynvi and Ogmore Railway with Alexander Brogden as chairman. When the new dock was opened on 22 July 1867 it was part of this new company. The place of honour went to the Brogden screw steamer SS John Brogden. By 1868 all lines were dual gauge so the essential motivation for the dock was no longer present.

It is not entirely clear why they built the Ogmore Valley as a standard gauge railway in a broad gauge area, forcing the decision to build a dock at considerable expense. It may have been unavoidable owing to the Railway Regulation (Gauge) Act 1846 (9 & 10 Vict. c. 57) of 1846. If so then perhaps it would have been cheaper to build the line as dual gauge from the start instead of building a dock. Perhaps even this was not permissible. The Llynvi Valley Railway was formed in 1861 by reopening pre-1846 lines. This is probably why it was permitted to use broad gauge. What is clear is that Brogdens sold off the Ulverston and Lancaster at about the same time as they started the Ogmore Valley Railway.

The trade of the new dock grew rapidly. In 1864 only 17,000 tons of coal passed out of the old outer basin but in 1871 the new inner dock shipped over 165,000 tons. In July 1873 the Great Western Railway took it over from the Llynvi and Ogmore, guaranteeing a dividend of 6%.

At the end of January 1865 James Brogden acquired 32 acres (130,000 m^{2}) of land adjoining the dock on behalf of the firm. In May 1867 he granted leases on the western side of what was to be the main street, to be called John Street in honour of his father. When Alexander later assumed control he stopped this venture. However, when the firm was dissolved, Mrs James Brogden acquired the land and she and her husband established on it the nucleus of modern Porthcawl.

=== Alexander takes charge ===
When John Brogden senior died in December 1869, Alexander assumed his father's position as head of the firm and came to Tondu to take control. He chose to reside in the vacant house of the co-respondent in James's divorce, despite the latter's protestations and offer to vacate Tondu House. This decision made it difficult to maintain the cordial relationship necessary to manage the business.

=== Llynvi, Tondu and Ogmore Coal and Iron Company ===
In December 1871 the fortunes of the Brogdens began to change when the firm made an agreement with the neighbouring Llynvi Coal and Iron Company Ltd which owned a large integrated ironworks at Maesteg, six miles (10 km) north of Tondu. As a result of the agreement, the two companies merged to form a new joint stock company, the Llynvi, Tondu and Ogmore Coal and Iron Company which was 'floated' in May 1872. The merger was probably inevitable as, in 1870, the Brogdens were challenged by the Llynvi company in the High Court after the former company had crossed the boundary of the latter in the Coegnant district and mined large quantities of Llynvi coal without permission. The Vice-Chancellor, Sir James Bacon, ruled in favour of the Llynvi Coal and Iron Co. and the Brogdens had to face a very large demand for compensation or an expensive appeal. The merger of the two companies quickly followed.

Although the Brogden family were the main shareholders in the new company and Alexander Brogden was the chairman, the family, for the first time, relinquished control over their fortunes as the new company had a large number of 'vocal' shareholders in the Manchester and Southport areas who closely monitored the progress of the new venture. In 1873, during a major strike among the iron company workers in south Wales, Alexander Brogden acted unilaterally and settled amicably with the workforce a month before the strike eventually ended in the rest of the coalfield. In the immediate aftermath of the strike Alexander Brogden was so highly regarded by his workforce in Maesteg that, for a time, it was suggested that the planned town hall in the valley should be named in his honour. By 1874 however, after a brief period of prosperity, profits slumped as the Tondu and Llynvi works faced competition from cheaper producers abroad and, more importantly, from cheap Bessemer steel. Losses accumulated until the company's debenture holders opted for voluntary liquidation in January 1878.

The company would have probably survived the trade depression of the late 1870s were it not for the untimely intervention of one of the old Llynvi company's debenture holders, probably George Moffatt, former chairman of the Llynvi Coal and Iron Company. Moffatt decided to withdraw his large debenture holding in December 1877, a move which would have resulted in bankruptcy proceedings with disastrous consequences for the debenture holders. As a result, the holders opted for the lesser evil of voluntary liquidation. The merger of 1871–2 proved to be disastrous for the Brogdens as they forfeited effective control over their Welsh enterprises, and expanded their exposure to iron, at a time when the south Wales wrought iron trade was about to enter a period of terminal decline.

=== Metropolitan Railway ===
Brogdens had other difficulties. They owned the Bwllfa Colliery in the Aberdare Valley (see above) and since the beginning of 1870 had supplied coal weekly to the Metropolitan Railway at favourable prices. A draft contract had been initialled by Alexander but never formally completed and Alexander decided to cease deliveries without notice. The Metropolitan held that the draft contract was valid and had been breached. A case was tried at the Surrey Spring Assizes (1873), the Court of Common Pleas and the House of Lords (1877), each of which held for the Metropolitan. This case is an important precedent in the law of contract.

== Alpine Crossing from France to Italy ==
The Mont Cenis Pass Railway between France and Italy was promoted and construction overseen by a partnership consisting of Alexander Brogden, The Duke of Sutherland, Sir James Hudson, Thomas Brassey, The Duke of Vallombrosa, Lord Abinger, Sir Robert Dallas, Edward Blount, Jervoise Smith, Thomas Crampton, W B Buddicom, J B Fell, and James Brunlees. Fell and Brunlees were the engineers. Fell designed the engine/rail system for mountain use and Brunlees designed the route in accordance with Fell's design. This temporary "Fell Railway" was the first mountain railway in the world. It operated from 1868 to 1871, and was replaced by the railway through the Mont Cenis Tunnel.

Although the railway was successful in technical and service terms, it is doubtful whether the shareholders got any of their money back and Brogdens had invested a lot. Out of 8,678 shares issued (as of August 1866), Alexander had taken 792. By November 1867 £150,000 had been raised by shares and only £2,600 by debentures. In October 1868, shareholders funds were unchanged but debentures stood at £180,000, loans £17,500 and creditors at £65,000. It follows that Alexander's share investment, now lost, had been about £13,700, plus one share of £1,000 in the Mont Cenis Concessionary Company which had been formed earlier to negotiate concessions from the two governments.

== Work in New Zealand ==
Towards the end of 1870 the New Zealand Government, dominated by Sir Julius Vogel, the Colonial Treasurer and soon to be Prime Minister, authorised the colony's first major railway construction programme as part of his great Public Works policy. Vogel travelled to London to negotiate loans and concluded an agreement with Brogdens to construct railways and provide plant to the value of £500,000. He also negotiated a much larger alternative contract, subject to parliamentary approval, which would give the colony £4,000,000 of railways and 10,000 immigrants in return for transferring 3,000,000 acres (12,000 km^{2}) of land to the contractors.

James Brogden travelled to New Zealand to complete them. He left Liverpool in August 1871 and returned to England early in 1873. The diary that he kept during his journey shows that he was engaged in very difficult and protracted negotiations. In October 1871 the New Zealand Parliament rejected the larger contract but allowed the ministry to negotiate an extension to the smaller one.

The government started its own immigration programme and also made an agreement with Brogdens that Brogdens would dispatch up to 2000 able-bodied men plus wives and children to a maximum of 6,000 adults. For this privilege Brogdens had to pay the government £10 per adult and could take promissory notes from the adult immigrants not exceeding £16 each. Brogdens hoped for great things and, under pressure from the New Zealand government began in April 1872 to ship immigrants. These immigrants, and rail workers in general in New Zealand, gained the nickname Brogdenites.

In England Brogdens were offering better terms than the New Zealand government, mainly in the sense that they paid most of the necessary costs themselves, relying on promissory notes from the immigrants, whereas the government wanted substantial payments in advance which were hard for a working man to find. For this reason the colony's Agent-General in London, Dr. Isaac Featherston directed staff to support the Brogden programme.

It was not easy to persuade men or families to leave their homeland. However the 1866 recession in copper-mining in Cornwall and bitter disputes between farmers and farm labourers assisted the recruiters. Charles Carter (1822–1896), a member of Featherston's recruitment staff who interviewed nearly all the "Brogden navvies", had been a Chartist sympathiser and an active propagandist for improved working class conditions before emigrating to New Zealand in 1850 and the campaign worked closely with the unions.

In 1872 the company was given six rail contracts as follows:

- Auckland and Mercer: completed 1875
- Wellington and Hutt: reached Lower Hutt in 1874
- Napier and Paki Paki
- Picton and Blenheim: completed 1875
- Dunedin and Clutha: part opened 1 July 1874, completed 1 September 1875
- Invercargill and Mataura: part opened 12 February 1874, completed 30 August 1875

for sections of railway totalling 159 miles (256 km) at a cost of £808,000.

There were considerable difficulties in the operation of the contracts and the management of the men. During the period 1870–1875, political power gradually transferred from the Provinces to the central government, partly because of the railway question. The Bill to abolish the Provinces was carried in October 1875 and implemented a year later. However, in the interim it was very difficult for Brogdens to get clear prompt decisions. Brogdens got less work than they had hoped and it became available more slowly than expected. Communications between UK and New Zealand were obviously slow so it was difficult to know how many men to send at any given time. Sometimes Brogdens could not find work for the men when they arrived. Men reneged on their promissory notes. There were disputes over working hours, wages and whether they should be paid when the weather stopped the work. Gradually the men drifted away. By August 1873, 2172 English immigrants had been brought out. They included 1299 working-age men who were contracted to work for Brogdens for two years but only 287 of them were still working for them. Most of the men were agricultural labourers, rather than true navvies and they found local agricultural labour and working conditions more attractive than navvy work.

Consequently, work was slower than expected and in 1879 the company was in dispute with the New Zealand Government over contract payments. Bankruptcy soon followed.

Although this was not a happy result for Brogdens, the results for New Zealand and the families themselves were good. New Zealand obtained useful citizens who were very happy with their work, wages, food and social conditions. Their letters home encouraged more people to come. Many of today's New Zealanders have ancestors who were members of the families who emigrated at this time.

== Other work ==
Brogdens built part of the Northampton and Peterborough Railway, from Oundle to Peterborough. They also doubled the line from Oundle to Peterborough (contracted 11 December 1845).

They built sluices and tidal gates at St Germans, Norfolk, one of the outlets of The Fens.

In July 1850 they joined Mr McClean in a lease of the South Staffordshire line. Alexander Brogden was general manager and Henry locomotive manager. This continued until February 1860 when the LNWR took a new lease. This line ran through Wednesbury and Alexander was elected as the first M.P. of that town in 1868. He held the seat until 1880.

In the Netherlands Brogdens held the concession to construct about 50 miles (80 km) of railway – the Tilburg and Nijmegen in North Brabant and Gelderland, which formed part of the Dutch South Eastern Railway Company (DSERC) and a new direct route from London to Berlin via Flushing (Vlissingen). There was some dispute with the DSERC but the nature of this dispute is not clear.

Richardson (1881) page 46 also refers to an ironworks in Finland and copper mines in Russia. An obituary of Henry Brogden refers to work in Australia and South America.

== The end of the company ==
The partnership of Alexander, Henry and James Brogden, trading as Brogdens from 52 Queen Victoria Street in the City of London, was dissolved on 31 July 1880 by order of the Chancery Division of Her Majesty's High Court of Justice with effect from 26 July. On 11 January 1884 the liquidations of Alexander and Henry were announced in the London Gazette. They had presented petitions for liquidation estimating their liabilities upwards of £500,000 with assets of £3,830.

The properties associated with the Brogdens in Tondu and Maesteg were purchased by North's Navigation Collieries Ltd in 1889. The new company, initially led by Colonel John T. North, the 'Nitrate King', produced iron at the Tondu site until 1896 before concentrating on the booming coal trade in the Llynfi and Ogmore valleys.

== Sources ==
- Andrews, Michael (October 1965). "The Origins of the Furness Railway 1". Journal of the Railway and Canal Historical Society: 7–11.
- Andrews, Michael (January 1966). "The Origins of the Furness Railway 2". Journal of the Railway and Canal Historical Society: 1–7.
- Andrews, Michael (2012). The Furness Railway. Barrai Books, Barrow. ISBN 978-0-9569709-0-9.
- Arnold, Rollo (1981). The Farthest Promised Land. Victoria University Press. ISBN 0-7055-0696-7.
- Atkinson, Neil (2007). Trainland: How Railways Made New Zealand. Random House New Zealand.
- Barrie, DSM (1980). Regional History of the Railways of Great Britain XII South Wales.
- Brogden, James (1873). "Diary 1871–1873". Welsh National Library. Picton. Papers: Brogden 1.
- Brunlees, James (1855). "On the Construction of the Sea Embankments, across the Estuaries Kent and Leven, In Morecambe Bay, for the Ulverstone and Lancaster Railway". Proc. Inst. Civil Engrs. 14: 239–250.
- Edgar, Stuart; Sinton, John M. (1990). The Solway Junction Railway. The Oakwood Press. ISBN 0-85361-395-8.
- Gooderson, P.J. "Railway Construction in Mid-nineteenth Century North Lancs., A Study based on the Diary of James Stelfox 1855–70". Journal of the Historic Society of Lancashire and Cheshire.
- Higgins, L.S. (Summer 1978). "The Brogden Pioneers of the early industrial development in Mid-Glamorgan". National Library of Wales Journal. XX (3): 240–252. Archived from the original on 15 October 2008.
- Leitch, David (1972). Railways of New Zealand. David and Charles. ISBN 1-86934-048-5.
- Lewis, David (2006). The Coal Industry in the Llynfi Valley. The History Press. ISBN 0-7524-3872-7.
- Manchester and Birmingham Railway Directors' Minutes: Public Record Office RAIL 454
- Manchester and Leeds Railway Directors' Minutes: Public Record Office RAIL 343
- Marshall, J.D. (1981) [1958]. Furness and the Industrial Revolution. Michael Moon, Beckermet, Cumbria. ISBN 0-904131-26-2.
- Marshall, J.D. (1970). The Lancashire and Yorkshire Railway. Vol. 1 of 3. David and Charles. ISBN 0-7153-5320-9.

Note: These two J D Marshalls are different people.

- Owen, David (2002). South Wales Collieries. Vol. 3. Tempus. ISBN 0-7524-2879-9.
- Popplewell, Lawrence (1985). A Gazetteer of the Railway Contractors and Engineers of Northern England 1830–1914. UK: Bournemouth: Melledgen Press. ISBN 0-906637-07-4.
- Ransom, P. J. G. (1999). The Mont Cenis Fell Railway. Truro: Twelveheads Press.
- Richards, Brinley (1982). History of the Llynfi Valley. Cowbridge, S Glamorgan: D Brown & Sons Ltd.
- Richardson, Joseph (1870). Furness Past and Present. Vol. 1 of 2.
- Richardson, Joseph (1881). Barrow in Furness, Its History, Development, Commerce, Industries and Institutions.
- Smiles, R (1870). "Memoir about John Brogden (senior)". Richardson (1870): 223.
- Watt, J.O.P. (1965). Southland's Pioneer Railways 1864–1878. Wellington, New Zealand: The New Zealand Railway and Locomotive Society Inc.
- Wells, G.J. "The Manchester South Junction and Altrincham Railway". Railway Magazine. 5: 331–338.
- Wells, Jeffrey (2000). The Eleven Towns Railway – The Story of the Manchester and Leeds Main Line. Railway and Canal Historical Society. ISBN 978-0-901461-21-6.
