= Thomas Russell Crampton =

British engineer (1816–1888)

Thomas Russell Crampton MICE, MIMechE
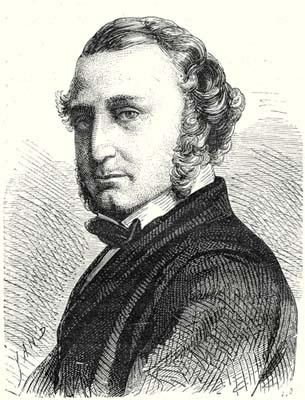
- Born: 6 August 1816; Broadstairs, Thanet, Kent
- Died: 19 April 1888 (aged 71); Westminster
- Occupation: Railway Engineer

Thomas Russell Crampton, MICE, MIMechE (6 August 1816 – 19 April 1888) was an English engineer born at Broadstairs, Kent, and trained on Brunel's Great Western Railway.

He is best known for designing the Crampton locomotive but had many engineering interests including the electric telegraph and the Channel Tunnel for which he designed a boring machine. His locomotives had much better success in France, Germany and Italy than they did in the UK.

== Personal life ==
Born to John and Mary Crampton of Prospect Cottage (in what is now Dickens Walk), Broadstairs, on 6 August 1816, Crampton was the son of a plumber and architect. He was educated privately. Crampton married Louisa Martha Hall, who was a singer and a friend of Jenny Lind, on 25 February 1841. They had 8 children, six boys and two girls. The eldest girl, Ada Sarah, died aged 4 on 16 February 1857. and Crampton gifted a stained glass window in St. Peter's church, Broadstairs in her memory. Their youngest daughter, Louisa, was to marry Sir Horace Rumbold, the Ambassador to the Netherlands.

He died at his home, 19 Ashley Place, Westminster on 19 April 1888 and was buried in Kensal Green Cemetery.

== Career ==
Crampton entered a career in engineering, initially with Marc Brunel and later with the Great Western Railway (GWR) in Swindon.

=== Great Western Railway 1839-43 ===
Crampton worked as assistant to Marc Brunel and on joining the GWR in 1839, then Daniel Gooch. Crampton was involved in the design of the "Firefly" class of locomotives. Gooch's aim was to produce broad gauge locomotives that were better than those on the standard gauge lines, thus proving the broad gauge system was the better technically. Crampton, unbeknown to the GWR, had the idea of improving standard gauge locomotives so that they could match those of the broad gauge. In 1843, he left the GWR.

=== Development 1844-51 ===
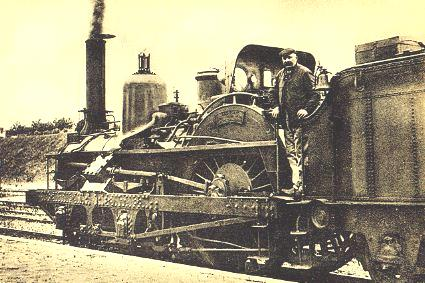
1846 Crampton locomotive

Crampton realised that the locomotives of the GWR were better than the standard gauge locomotives for a number of reasons. The broad gauge allowed a larger boiler diameter and higher centre of gravity for the same stability. Broad gauge also allowed a bigger firebox and heating area. Larger driving wheels gave a lower piston speed, which allowed a higher speed for the locomotive before exhaust problems occurred.

In 1843, Crampton took out a patent for a new design of locomotive. It is for the physical appearance of his locomotives that Crampton is remembered for today, with the driving wheel placed behind the firebox. But there were technical improvements that he made, which laid the foundations for future locomotive design. The three most important improvements were:- wide steam passages, large heating surfaces and generous bearing surfaces on the wheels.

From 1844 to 1848, Crampton was working for John and George Rennie.

In 1845, Crampton received his first order for a locomotive built to his patent. The Namur and Liège Railway in Belgium ordered three locomotives with 7 feet (2.13 m) diameter driving wheels and a 14.5 square feet (1.35 m^{2}) grate. They were built by the firm of Tulk and Ley of Whitehaven. One of the locomotives was tested in 1847 on the London and North Western Railway, who then built a "Crampton Patent" locomotive at Crewe. Another two locomotives were bought by the LNWR, including a 6-2-0 Liverpool built by Bury, Curtis and Kennedy in 1848 with 8 feet (2.44 m) diameter driving wheels. A claim of 79 miles per hour (127 km/h) being achieved was made, with an average of 53 miles per hour (85 km/h) over 30 miles (48 km) with a 60-ton load. Another claim was for a speed of hauling eight carriages over 16 miles (26 km) at an average speed of 74 miles per hour (119 km/h).

One locomotive Crampton designed had an indirect drive arrangement, with a crankshaft between the driving wheels. This locomotive had a 2-2+2-2 wheel arrangement. In 1847, Crampton became a founder member of the Institution of Mechanical Engineers, and in 1848, Crampton set up in business as a Civil Engineer in London. In 1850, a Crampton locomotive was exhibited at Birmingham which had balance weights on the driving wheels. This feature was commented upon by William Stroudley. In 1851, Crampton started the Broadstairs Gasworks, overseeing the construction and financing much of the works.

=== South Eastern Railway 1851-88 ===
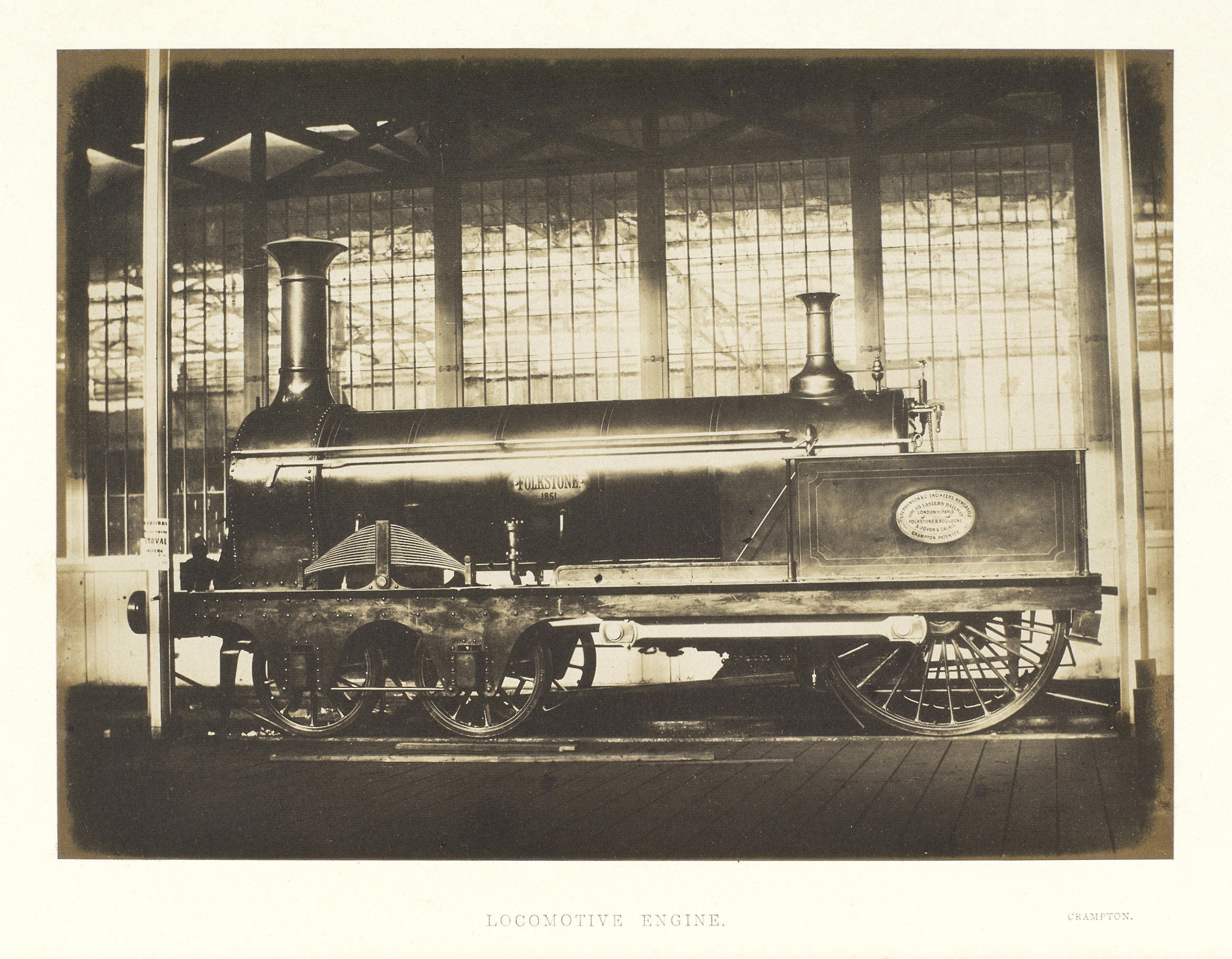
No. 136 Folkstone at The Great Exhibition, 1851

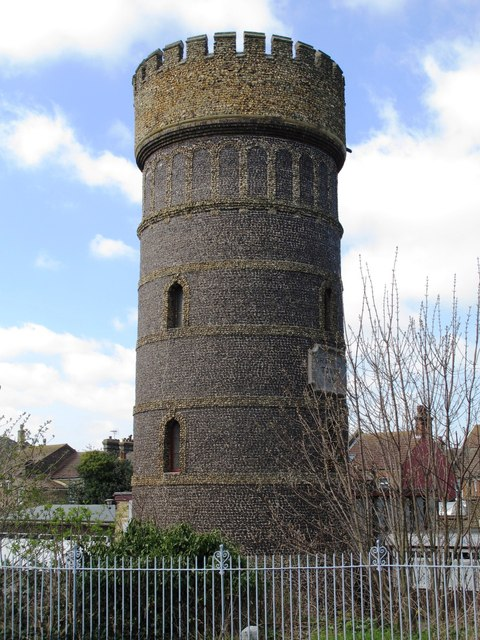
Crampton's water tower, Broadstairs

By 1851, Crampton was working for the South Eastern Railway (SER). In that year, ten new Crampton locomotives were built, and one of these, No.136 Folkstone was exhibited at The Great Exhibition. In 1854, Crampton became a member of the Institution of Civil Engineers and in 1855 he was responsible for the building of the Berlin waterworks. In 1856, Crampton was appointed to the Prussian Order of the Red Eagle. In 1859, Crampton formed the Broadstairs Water Company, building a water tower 80 feet (24.38 m) high which now forms the Crampton Tower Museum. The water tower could hold 83,000 imperial gallons (380,000 L) of water. Broadstairs Water Company was taken over by Broadstairs Urban District Council in 1901. In 1860, Crampton designed a tower for Holy Trinity church, Broadstairs, which Dickens had described as a "hideous temple of flint, a petrified haystack". Crampton donated a clock as a personal gift to the church. He also donated a wrought iron bridge which was built across Goodson Steps. This is the Louisa Gap bridge, named after his youngest daughter. Crampton was elected vice-president of the Institution of Mechanical Engineers in 1883.

=== Peto, Betts and Crampton ===
Crampton entered a partnership with Sir Morton Peto and Edward Betts to undertake part of the construction of the London Chatham and Dover Railway. When the partnership became insolvent in 1867, Crampton was made personally bankrupt, but, unlike Peto and Betts, managed to retain his good reputation and continue in business.

=== Railway lines constructed ===
Crampton was, wholly or partly, responsible for the railway lines built between Smyrna and Aidin; Varna and Rustchuk; Strood and Dover; Sevenoaks and Swanley; and Herne Bay and Faversham. The latter three lines being built by the London, Chatham and Dover Railway (LCDR). Crampton was also the contractor, and later chairman of the East and West Junction Railway. A Crampton locomotive was used to haul the first train from Kineton to Fenny Compton. Crampton was a partner in the Mont Cenis Pass Railway

=== Electric telegraph ===
Crampton was responsible for the laying of the first international submarine cable in the world. This was laid in the Strait of Dover in 1851. The first messages were carried on 13 November 1851 and the cable was in use until 1859.

The company behind the project was an Anglo-French undertaking, known as la Compagnie du télégraphe sous-marin in France and the Submarine Telegraph Company between France and England in Great Britain. Crampton was the engineer, and Charlton Wollaston was the electrician involved in laying the cable across the Channel. The SER were another early user of the electric telegraph, and it was by use of the SER's wires that messages were able to be transmitted between Paris and London, being relayed from Dover.

=== Channel Tunnel ===
Crampton designed an automatic hydraulic tunnel boring machine, which was intended to be used in the construction of the Channel Tunnel. Modern drilling techniques were made possible by this invention.

== Family ==
Crampton's first wife died on 16 March 1875 and he married Elizabeth Werge on 25 August 1881. He left six sons and one daughter, who married Sir Horace Rumbold, ambassador at Vienna.
