= Alexander Brogden =

British railway contractor, iron and coal master (1825–1892)

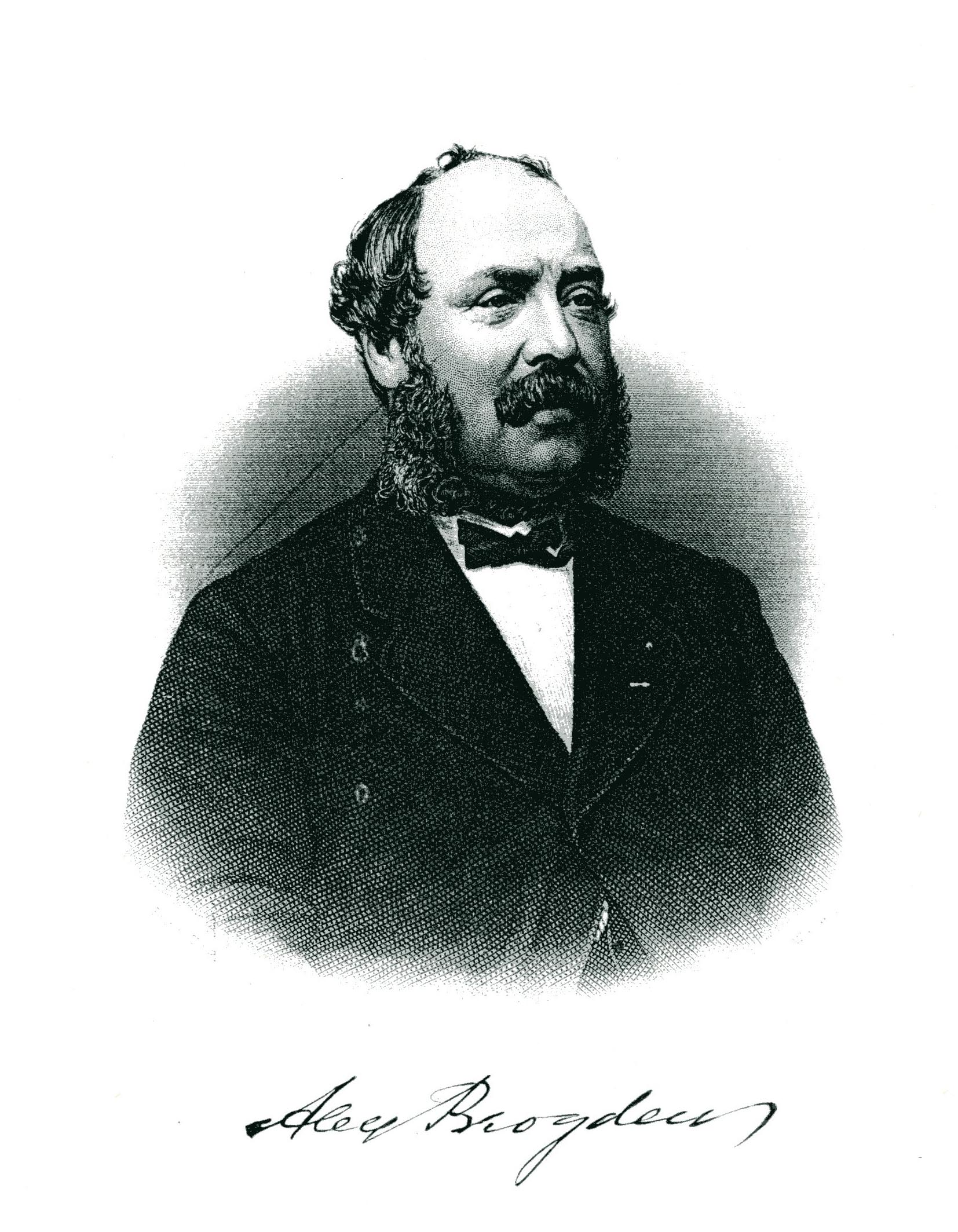
- Born: 3 November 1825; Manchester, Lancashire, UK
- Died: 26 November 1892 (aged 67); Croydon, Surrey, UK
- Occupations: Railway contractor, iron and coal master

Alexander Brogden (3 November 1825 – 26 November 1892) was a politician who became Member of Parliament for Wednesbury, England.

== Career ==
Brogden was born in Manchester on 3 November 1825, the second son of John Brogden (1798 – 1869) and educated at Blackburn, New College Manchester and King's College London, where he read mathematics. He married Anne Garstang on 6 September 1848 at Manchester Cathedral. He joined his father's contracting business, John Brogden and Sons, in 1846. He had intended to join the Bar but was persuaded to support his father instead. Among his first work for the firm was the supervision of contracts for the Manchester, South Junction and Altrincham Railway, the Ashton Branch of the Manchester and Birmingham Railway and the East Lancashire Railway.

In 1850 Brogdens took a lease of the South Staffordshire Line jointly with John McClean and Alexander managed this for about six years. During the building of the Ulverston and Lancaster Railway, Alexander supervised for the firm while James Brunlees was the Engineer. Alexander Brogden was the first chairman of the Solway Junction Railway, again with James Brunlees as the Engineer.

With the sudden death of his elder brother John in 1855 and the increasing age of his father, it can be assumed that he gradually took control of the business in the late 1850s and assumed full control on his father's death in 1869. During the 1860s he and his wife resided at Holme Island, Grange-over-Sands, This is now in Cumbria but was then in North Lancashire.

The Brogden family had a majority holding in the Ulverston Mining Co. in 1857. Alexander became the sole lessee in 1872.

Brogden unsuccessfully contested Great Yarmouth as a Liberal in July 1865, but was elected as the first member for Wednesbury in December 1868 and represented that constituency for 18 years.

In 1878 Brogden paid for the organ of West Bromwich Town Hall.

In 1881 it was claimed that, when Parliament was not in session, he might be found in the space of 10 days in: Ulverston, Westminster, Cardiff, Paris, Holland and St Petersburg.

Alexander Brogden's liquidation was announced in the London Gazette on 11 January 1884. This was owing to the failure of John Brogden and Sons. The Gazette entry gives many addresses: Queen Anne's Gate and Victoria Chambers, Westminster; Aberdare; Tondu; Meathop, Westmorland; Frampton Cotterell, Gloucestershire; The Hague; Cross Street, Manchester; 46 Dulwich Road, Herne Hill; Ulverstone; Grange-over-Sands; and Wellington, New Zealand. He subsequently chose not to contest his parliamentary seat at the 1885 general election.

Alexander Brogden died at 88 Lansdown Road, Croydon on 26 November 1892 at the age of 67. The Times records that he had been ailing. He was sitting by the fire and accidentally fell against the grate while attempting to stir the fire, receiving severe burns. He left a widow and a married daughter. Alexander Brogden and his wife also had a son, James Garstang Brogden, who died before his father. He was born in 1850 and died in 1885. .

== See also ==
- John Hick

== Other reading ==
- Brogden, Alexander. (8 January 1880), "Speech at Wednesbury", The Times
- Gilpin, L.R. (October 1989), "The Bustling Alexander", Cumbrian Railways, 4 (6)
- Richardson, Joseph (1870), Furness Past and Present, 1, vol. of 2
- Smiles, R (1870), "Memoir about John Brogden (Senior)", Richardson (1870): 223

Parliament of the United Kingdom
New constituency	Member of Parliament for Wednesbury; 1868–1885	Succeeded by Wilson Lloyd
