= Tondu =

Village in Wales

Coordinates: 51.54670°N 03.59783°W

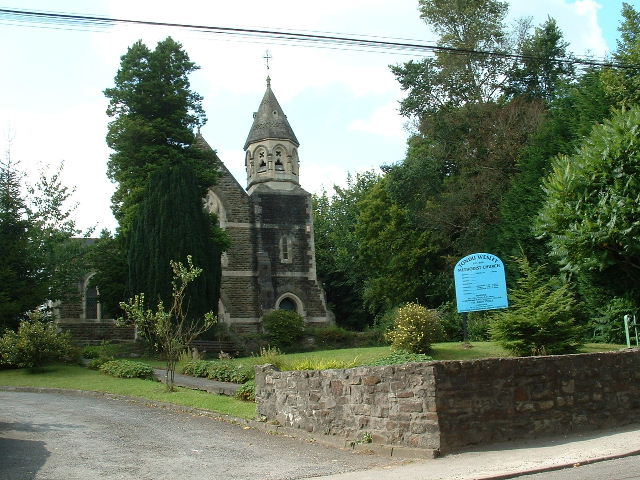
- Tondu Wesley Methodist church

- Location within Bridgend
- OS grid reference: SS893843
- Community: Ynysawdre
- Principal area: Bridgend
- Preserved county: Mid Glamorgan
- Country: Wales
- Sovereign state: United Kingdom
- Post town: BRIDGEND
- Postcode district: CF32
- Dialling code: 01656
- Police: South Wales
- Fire: South Wales
- Ambulance: Welsh
- UK Parliament: Bridgend
- Senedd Cymru – Welsh Parliament: Ogmore

Tondu (English: ”black meadow”) is a village in Bridgend County Borough, Wales, located about 3 miles (4.8 km) north of the town of Bridgend, in the community of Ynysawdre.

Tondu lies on the A4063 from Bridgend to Maesteg, and was established in the late 18th century as a coal mining village servicing the Parc Slip Colliery. In later years, an iron works was also established, and in the 19th century, a brick works was constructed using the clay from the carboniferous coal measures to make a variety of bricks, mostly for engineering. The brick works was demolished in 1977. The association with the coal industry was also reflected in the large area office of the National Coal Board in the village and a centre for the Mines Rescue Service.

== Railway connections ==
The village has several railway lines and provided access to collieries in Wern-Tarw and the Ogmore and Garw valleys, along with maintenance facilities. All were closed to passenger traffic in the 1960s. They were used extensively by coal trains until the mine closures in the 1980s. The Wern-Tarw line was disused and lifted first, followed by the Ogmore line sometime afterwards. The Garw line is disused, but still extant. During the early 1990s the Bridgend to Maesteg line was re-opened to passenger traffic and provides a service to Cardiff. Occasional steel trains run via the Margam to Tondu and Tondu to Bridgend branch lines. The Margam line is now used by the new Parc Slip opencast mine for coal. The village is served by Tondu railway station.

== River Llynfi ==
The River Llynfi flows alongside Tondu on its way to its confluence with the River Ogmore. The Llynfi at this point has had a history of severe pollution. Historically, the pollution started with the coal industry. The coal seams in this part of the South Wales Valleys are quite wet and the coal itself is rich in pyrites and thus also rich in sulphur. Such mine waters have a very high burden of coal and rock solids and also contain heavy metals such as nickel, iron and copper in acidic solution. For many years the river also suffered from pollution from a paper mill at Maesteg.

== History ==
=== Sir Robert Price ===
Sir Robert Price took over leases around Tondu Farm previously granted to William Bryant, the liquidator of John Bedford's business. Sir Robert had ambitions as an ironmaster and began to develop an ironworks alongside the Dyffryn Llynvi and Porthcawl Railway at Tondu in the late 1830s. He traded as the Glamorgan Coal and Iron Company. Progress was initially slow due to a trade recession in the early 1840s, but there was a revival in 1843 and the first furnace at Tondu was blown-in in 1844. The year 1843 was significant for the Tondu district as extensive reserves of black-band ironstone were discovered six miles (10 km) to the north in the Maesteg area during that year. The discovery, and an unprecedented period of growth in the iron trade during the mid-1840s, prompted Sir Robert to develop his works at Tondu and open-up the Tywith coal and ironstone mine near present-day Nantyffyllon, Maesteg. Typically for the iron trade, prices fell sharply after the short-lived boom period and, as a result, the Tondu Works struggled to survive through the early 1850s and Sir Robert Price faced bankruptcy. However, because of the progress made during the years 1843–1847, the Tondu Ironworks and associated mines formed a significant pocket of production in mid-Glamorgan with some potential. That potential was recognised by the Lancashire firm of John Brogden and Sons who bought the Tondu property in 1854. .

=== Brogdens ===
In February 1854 John Brogden sent his fourth son James, aged 22, to revive and run the business. In July 1854, John Brogden signed a new 99-year lease with Jane Nicholl. James rapidly reorganised and expanded the works. James rebuilt Tondu House between 1854 and 1857. In the 1861 census he said he was employing 900 men and farming 1,100 acres (4.5 km^{2}) with 20 men.

In 1856 the Brogdens re-opened Price's coal and ore mine at Tywith, and, during the mid-1860s, developed collieries at Park Slip, Aberkenfig, Garth, Maesteg and Wyndham and Tynewydd in the Ogmore Valley - all managed from Tondu. In July 1863 Brogdens obtained an Act of Parliament to build a new standard gauge railway in the Ogmore Valley and to lay a third rail on the existing broad gauge Lynfi Railway to Porthcawl. In 1866 they obtained an Act to merge the two railway companies. In 1867 they opened a new dock in Porthcawl. All of these measures helped to promote the growth of industry in the area.

=== Brogdens give way to North's Navigation ===
In 1869, John Brogden died and his eldest son Alexander Brogden came to Tondu to take charge of the business. In 1872 Alexander formed a new joint-stock company, the Llynvi, Tondu and Ogmore Coal and Iron Company Limited which merged Brogdens’ Glamorgan business interests with those of the Llynvi Coal and Iron Co. This moved was probably forced - Brogdens' Tywith mine had encroached on the other company's territory and the merger was in lieu of compensation. However the new company was short-lived. The Llynfi company was financed by debentures which could be withdrawn at short notice. A major debenture holder did withdraw making the merged company insolvent. It was wound up by creditors in 1878. The liquidator made a number of attempts to make the business viable until it was taken over by North's Navigation Collieries (1889) Ltd.

=== Disastrous explosion ===
On the day of the annual St. Mary Hill Fair, 26 August 1892, a huge explosion shook the Parc Slip Colliery; 112 men and boys died with just 39 survivors: some remained trapped underground for a week before being rescued. Sixty women were widowed and 153 children left fatherless. The mine closed in 1904. A memorial to the disaster still stands consisting of 112 stones - one for every death. Much later, the coal seams were re-worked as part of the Parc Slip opencast coal mine.

=== New manager ===
Also in 1892, John Boyd-Harvey was appointed General Manager and managing director. Boyd-Harvey was a Cornishman who had studied gas production in Swansea – under the circumstances a very useful thing. He had followed his elder brother Robert to South America. Robert had gone into partnership with Colonel North there and John also joined the business, managing the Iquique Gas Company on the border of Chile and Peru. He retired in 1913, at the early age of 52. After that North's Navigation continued until the Nationalisation of Coal in 1947, although the iron works was closed.

=== Tondu House ===
The General Managers lived in Tondu House until 1940 when the house was commandeered by the Ministry of Supply for the Pyrotechnic Research Department (PRD), evacuated from London. The site was chosen because it was in an elevated and relatively isolated position, some distance from a built-up area and only four miles from ROF Bridgend. This involved Tondu with some very important war work, including the development of incendiary flares that were dropped on targets by Pathfinder aircraft. These aircraft, including the famous Mosquito, would fly ahead of the main bomber force and locate and mark the targets with the flares. PRD was relocated to Langhurst Sussex in 1957, where it merged with the former Flame Warfare Research Establishment. Today there is still evidence of the PRD's presence at Tondu Farm; a concrete viewing shelter in the woods close to the farm, from which the researchers could safely view and assess their experimental pyrotechnics. The Tondu House Mansion was demolished in 1963 by its owners Merthyr Mawr Estate, due to its poor and dangerous condition, leaving only one residential cottage standing amongst its outbuildings. It was then leased to a farmer until 2001.

=== The Old Pit Pony Hospital ===
On site is an old pit pony hospital where all the local pit ponies came for treatment and rest during their lives in the local pits. It was the only pit pony hospital in Mid Glamorgan.

== Governance ==
At the local level Tondu is a community electoral ward to Ynysawdre Community Council, represented by up to six of the ten community councillors.

Ynysawdre is part of 'St Bride's Minor and Ynysawdre' ward on Bridgend County Borough Council.
