= John Brogden (industrialist) =

British railway contractor and promoter (1798–1869)

- John Brogden – Industrialist
- Born: 2 February 1798; Clitheroe, Lancashire, UK
- Died: 9 December 1869 (aged 71); Sale, Cheshire, UK
- Occupations: Railway contractor, iron and coal master
- Children: 7, including John Jr., Alexander, Henry and James
- Relatives: Samuel Budgett (father-in-law)

John Brogden (2 February 1798 – 9 December 1869) was a railway industrialist. He formed the company John Brogden and Sons with four of his five sons.

== Early life ==
Brogden was born on 2 February 1798 on his father's farm at Worston, near Clitheroe in Lancashire. He was raised in Worston and at another farm near Clitheroe. He was educated at Clitheroe Grammar School.

== John Brogden and Sons ==
As a young man he moved to a rapidly growing Manchester and established himself as a cleansing contractor. Whereas other ambitious young men in Manchester at that time chose to work in the burgeoning cotton industry, Brogden was an outdoor man, fond of riding and hunting and experienced with horses, so he preferred to work in haulage and transport. He partnered with Joseph Whitworth to use the latter's patent cleansing machines. He also started the same business in Westminster.

In 1838, he obtained contracts with the Manchester and Leeds Railway Company to build their Manchester station (now Manchester Victoria station) and the viaduct from the station to Miles Platting.

He formed the company John Brogden and Sons, after the eldest four of his five sons came of age and joined him in business. He took iron-mining leases in Furness. They quickly saw that a rail link from Furness to the rest of England and Wales was critical to the industrial development of Furness so they promoted the Ulverston and Lancaster Railway to run across Morecambe Bay from Carnforth to Ulverston, with the Ulverstone and Lancaster Railway Act 1851 (14 & 15 Vict. c. cii) receiving royal assent in 1851. This was an innovative, challenging and risky project but it was eventually completed in 1857 and soon purchased by the Furness Railway.

Beginning in 1853 the family expanded into South Wales buying mining leases and an Iron Works in the Llynfi and Ogmore Valleys. They developed these vigorously, also building a railway in the Ogmore Valley and a new harbour at Porthcawl.

== Personal life ==
In 1822 he married Sarah Hannah McWilliams, only daughter of Alexander McWilliams of Hazelhurst near Ashton-under-Lyne. She had been educated at the Moravian School in Dukinfield . From an early age Brogden was a Methodist and in later life he contributed generously in time and money to Methodist and other good causes. The family lived as Methodists. The Methodists had close connections with the Moravians and, on his many travels, John would have found Methodist chapels much easier to find than Moravian ones.

=== Sons and daughters ===
Brogden's sons joined him in the family company. His children were as follows;

John Brogden Junior, born Manchester 1823, married Ellen Garstang 20 March 1849 at Manchester Cathedral, died suddenly on 6 November 1855 at his home, Lightburn House, Ulverston, age 32.

Alexander Brogden, born Manchester 3 November 1825, married Ann Garstang 6 September 1848 at Manchester Cathedral., died 26 November 1892 in Croydon.

Henry Brogden, born Manchester 1828, married Sarah Ann Marshall on 11 September 1862 in Stockport, died at Hale Lodge, Hale, Altrincham, Cheshire in 1913.

James Brogden, born Manchester 7 April 1832, spent most of his adult life in Mid-Glamorgan, first at Tondu and later at Porthcawl, where he died in January 1907.

George William Hargreaves Brogden, was born in 1842 and died in London in 1892. George was the only son not to join his father in business.

Sarah Hannah, born in 1834, married Samuel Budgett on 5 June 1858. He was son and joint heir of the Bristol grocer Samuel Budgett. She died in 1905.

Mary Jane, referred to as Jenny, married William Billing in Manchester Cathedral on 18 December 1867 and at one time they lived at Dunham Grange, Bowdon, Cheshire.

== Death ==
John Brogden (sen.) died at his home, Raglan House, Raglan Road, Sale (then in Cheshire) on 9 December 1869.

== Legacy ==
In his will he left his business to his sons Alexander, Henry and James but he also set up a trust for Mrs Billing of £7,250 and previously a marriage settlement of £10,000. The trustees were: Alexander and James Brogden, and Samuel Budgett. For five years from his death the partners were empowered to use the trust money in the business but after that they had to provide evidence of good assets that were independent of it. They failed to do this so that, from December 1874, all the trustees were in breach of trust and therefore all individually liable to replace all the assets of the trust. No doubt they hoped that the firm would pull through. In fact, Brogdens failed in 1880 and Mary Billing sued the trustees for the money. The action "Billing vs. Brogden" was tried in 1887 and appealed in 1888 with the result that Samuel Budgett, the only solvent trustee, had to replace all the trust's missing money himself. The partnership of James, William and Samuel Budgett, trading as H.H. & S. Budgett, broke up. James and William each ended up successfully running his own part of the old firm as a separate enterprise. Samuel and two of his sons also got a small piece but rapidly went bankrupt.

== Sources ==
- Andrews, Michael (2012), The Furness Railway: A History, Barrai Books, Barrow in Furness
- Casson, Robert (1889), A Few Furness Worthies, pp. 66–68
- Gilpin, L.R. (February 1988), "John Brogden of Manchester", Cumbrian Railways, 3 (15) Online
- Higgins, L.S. (Summer 1978), "The Brogden Pioneers of the early industrial development in Mid-Glamorgan", National Library of Wales Journal, XX (3): 240–252 Online
- Marshall, J.D. (1981) [1958], Furness and the Industrial Revolution, Michael Moon, Beckermet, Cumbria, ISBN 0-904131-26-2
- Richardson, Joseph (1870), Furness Past and Present, vol. 1
- Smiles, R (1870), "Memoir about John Brogden (Senior)", Richardson (1870): 223
- The Times (10 August 1887), "Law Reports – High Court – Chancery Division: Billing v Brogden", The Times
- The Times (27 February 1888), "Law Reports – High Court – Chancery Division: Billing v Brogden", The Times
- The Times (9 May 1888), "Law Reports – Court of Appeal: Billing v Brogden", The Times
- The Times (29 November 1892), "Obituary: Alexander Brogden", The Times: 10
- Wednesbury Herald (13 August 1887), "The late Liberal Member for Wednesbury – Important Action", Wednesbury Herald
- Wells, Jeffrey (2000), The Eleven Towns Railway: The Story of the Manchester and Leeds Main Line, Railway and Canal Historical Society
