= John Brogden Jun. (industrialist) =

British businessman

John Brogden Junior was the eldest son of John Brogden (1798–1869). He was born in Manchester in 1823. He was educated at the academy in Blackburn and then studied chemistry in Manchester. He joined his father’s business (John Brogden and Sons) in 1846 and was closely involved with all the work. He appears to have taken a particular interest in the coal and iron mining and in the Ulverston and Lancaster Railway. He joined the Institution of Civil Engineers as an Associate in 1852 and was also a fellow of the Geological Society and a Member of the British Association.

Brogden died on 6 November 1855 suddenly of apoplexy at his residence, Lightburn House, Ulverston at the age of 32. He was preparing to chair a Methodist meeting at the end of his day’s work. His early death was a serious blow to his father’s firm as well as to the family.
