= Budgett =

Budgett is a surname.

According to Reaney, Budgett is cognate with Burchard and similar names. However it is not obvious how Burg would transform to Budg.

There is a verbal tradition in the family that they migrated from France and that the name originates from the French word bougette. Bougette, the diminutive of bouge, means a small leather bag, pouch or wallet and is in fact the origin of the ordinary English and French word budget.

The Parish Register at Nunney in Somerset begins in 1547 and shows the surname Budget (in various spellings) from 1550 onwards. This seems to be the first appearance of the name in England. The Budgett spelling is rare at Nunney until the Nineteenth Century. Most migrants from France to England were Protestants (known as Huguenots) fleeing persecution. There doesn't seem to be any written confirmation that the first English Budgets were Protestant French fugitives but it is a reasonable theory.

People with the surname Budgett include:

- Arthur Budgett (1916–2011), British Thoroughbred racehorse trainer, one of only two people to have bred, owned, and trained two English Derby winners
- Graham Budgett (born 1954), British-American conceptual artist
- Greg Budgett (born c. 1952), American comics artist
- John Samuel Budgett (1872–1904), British zoologist and embryologist; did extensive research in tropical rivers
- Nathan Budgett (born 1975), Welsh rugby union player; currently playing for Bristol
- Richard Budgett (born 1959), British Olympic rower (gold medal, coxed fours, 1984). Medical and Scientific Director of the International Olympic Committee (Oct 2012 onwards).
- Samuel Budgett (1794–1851), Founded a wholesale grocery firm in Bristol. Strong Methodist supporter. The firm outlived him by over 100 years.

== Other uses ==
- Budgett's frog, a species of frog in the family Ceratophryidae, discovered by John Samuel Budgett

== See also ==
- James Edward Budgett Meakin, (1866–1906) English journalist and travel writer
- H.H. & S. Budgett, a grocery founded by Samuel Budgett in Kingswood, near Bristol
