= Samuel Budgett =

English merchant (1794–1851)

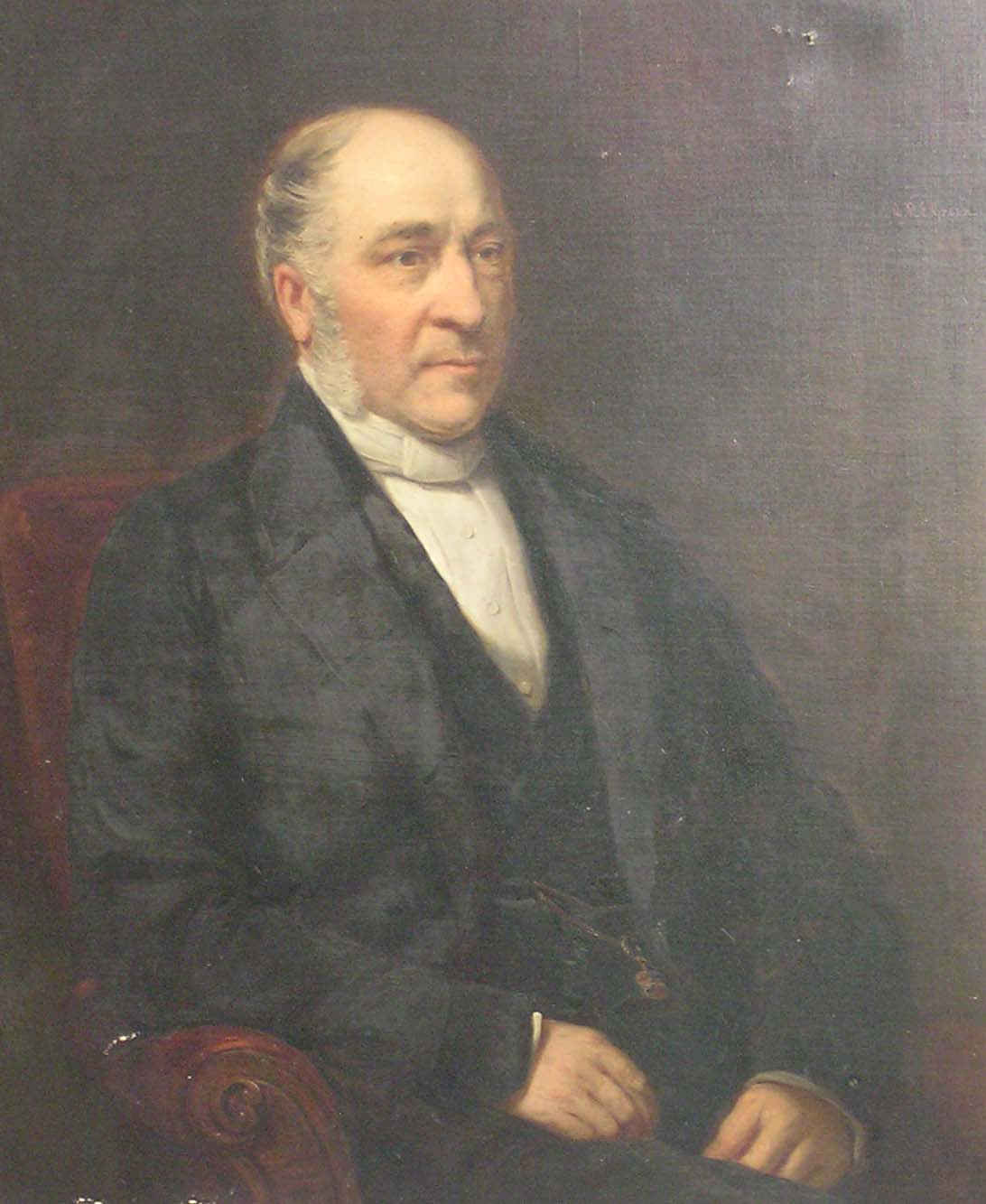
- Samuel Budgett
- Born: 27 July 1794; Wrington, Somerset, UK
- Died: 29 April 1851 (aged 56); Kingswood, Bristol, UK
- Occupation: Wholesale Grocer

Samuel Budgett (27 July 1794 – 29 April 1851) was an English merchant.

Rising from humble origins, Budgett built up a wholesale grocery business called H.H. & S. Budgett, based in Kingswood Bristol, covering a large area of Southern and Western England and South Wales, which outlasted him by over a century. He was a devoted Wesleyan Methodist, who came close to offering himself as a missionary. Having chosen instead to work as a grocer to support his impoverished parents and siblings, he applied Christian principles to his business, setting improving standards in food purity and working conditions. He also began each day's business with a short Christian service for all staff.

With his elder brother, Samuel Budgett made a big difference to Kingswood. Having arrived in 1809 with nothing but his apprenticeship, he never left the place, even when he could afford to do so. He built a strong business, providing many jobs. He built a house and laid gardens and a farm. These provided more employment, as well as space for meetings and parties. He was a watchful but gentle employer, seeking above all to help people to increase their own self-mastery and usefulness. He led efforts to build chapels and schools where ordinary people could gain knowledge and learn the art of citizenship. He gave much of his money to these causes and to individuals in trouble.

Shortly after his death a biography – The Successful Merchant, by William Arthur – was published which went into over forty editions in the UK alone and made him well known. Robert Louis Stevenson, in his book Virginibus Puerisque, mentions Samuel Budgett in passing, apparently confident that he requires no introduction.

NOTE: Both Samuel Budgett and his biographer William Arthur were devout Methodists at a time when Methodism was very strong in the UK. Arthur's book says much about Samuel's Christian principles and actions as well as recommending that the reader should treat him as an example. It has been suggested that Arthur's account is biased. However it is an account of how Samuel (and others) thought and acted, written by the man with the best access to those who knew and it is now the only account we have. Arthur himself wrote, “... an effort has been made to insert, with a firm hand, every real scar. Some will say they are too slight; others will say they are too deep, and these they who most intimately knew the original." In this article both the religious and secular aspects of the man are presented using Arthur as the guide.

== Early life ==
Samuel Budgett was born in Wrington on 27 July 1794. His father's first wife had died and he had married again, Samuel being the eldest son of this second marriage, at Whatley near Frome, in 1788, to Elizabeth (Betsy) Budgett (1767–1831). His parents moved several times. In 1801 they took a shop in Kingswood, Bristol. In 1803 parents and children moved again to Coleford, Somerset where they opened a small general shop, leaving Henry Hill Budgett in charge of the Kingswood shop. Henry was a grown up son of the first marriage, about 15 years older than Samuel.

The family were poor but were devoted members of the Methodist Chapel wherever they lived. Samuel's two passions were his faith and his constant desire to get a little extra money by trading. He had to choose whether to be a missionary or a trader. His parents' poverty prevented them from affording a missionary's education. It also meant that they needed him as a breadwinner. So he decided to be a trader. Initially he was buying and selling things worth only a few pence. Gradually he was able to plough back his profits and trade larger amounts. Finally his capital reached 30 pounds. He gave this all to his mother before leaving to become an apprentice.

At the age of thirteen, Samuel learned a very useful lesson from an adult salesman. This man tried and failed to make headway with his mother. Samuel realised that this was because the man ran through his whole range, never producing any special bargains. He saw that if the man had first offered one or two genuine bargains, this would have got his mother's attention and "hooked" her for other sales, This became one of his principles of business.

== Apprentice ==
In April 1809, at the age of 14, Samuel bound himself to Henry for seven years as an apprentice grocer. The hours were long: typically 6am to 9pm or later. Worse, in June 1812 Henry sacked his brother for “want of ability”. Although he did look undersize and understrength, Samuel managed to find work with another grocer. He was well liked and successful. Then six months later, Henry went back on his earlier decision and re-instated Samuel as apprentice, not as an offer but insisting that the indentures gave him the right to demand his return. Although he was happy in his new position and his employer offered to increase his pay, Samuel felt bound to his brother and obediently returned. He worked as a Sunday School teacher at the local chapel. When the apprenticeship ended in about 1816, he agreed a contract with his brother to work the next three years at 40, 50 and 60 pounds respectively. He spent only essential money on himself and managed to save 100 pounds in the three years and give money to friends and family as well.

== Partnership ==
At this point it turned out that Henry had lost money in speculation, although his main business was prospering. Samuel gave his 100 pounds to his brother to help him out. At the same time, Henry made Samuel his partner. Samuel took a small cottage near the shop and married Ann Smith from Midsomer Norton. Even as a hired man, he had been running a department of the shop, buying carefully, selling at keen prices, presenting his low prices well and making his customers feel welcome. People were coming to the shop from neighbouring villages. Now to increase sales further he himself went out to these villages to save them the trouble of travelling.

The next few years are covered in more detail in H.H. & S. Budgett. Briefly, against his brother's misgivings, he started to sell common items to outlying shops where the price difference made it worthwhile. Having mastered that, the trade was grown carefully and slowly, adding new commodities for old customers, visiting larger shops in larger towns, travelling further away, carefully recruiting travellers and revisiting, in a relaxed manner, the fancy shops which had previously refused him. In time the business reached as far as Birmingham and Penzance.

As they advanced, Samuel bought the grounds of an old quarry in Kingswood. Here he built a substantial house where he lived to the end of his life. Later he had this filled in and made into gardens and farmland, forty to fifty acres. This was partly to provide local employment. Long afterwards an old man said, "Yes; I remember when there were five men and three horses, and I have lived to see three hundred men and one hundred horses". During a food shortage in 1846 and 1847 he employed many extra people just to keep them from starving.

== Samuel Budgett's Principles of Business ==
From the start Samuel had very clear principles about how to run a business and carefully designed rules for employees. Although the detailed rules changed, the outline was fixed and deviations from the current rules were taken very seriously.

1. He always tried to adhere to Christian principles. He felt it was not worth getting a bit more if you lost your soul as a result. More to the point, you shouldn't tempt others into losing their souls. Samuel well knew the difference between a Christian and a pseudo-Christian. A Wesleyan lay-preacher once used his religious position to get an interview. He tried to sell Samuel a scheme to make mock vinegar, to be sold as real. He was roundly rebuked, especially because of his position of trust, and sent packing.
2. They began every day with an Act of Worship, about 30 minutes, in a room set aside as a chapel. If a family member was present he would lead but there was a rota of others who often led.
3. Punctuality. Samuel received a list of latecomers each day. Anyone who stayed off the list for a year received a sovereign. Each man received a penny on first arriving at 6 am, again after breakfast, and again after dinner. If he was late he forfeited the penny. This provided a gentle encouragement and it replaced a tradition of providing free beer. Samuel did not mind if men chose to drink moderately but he knew the risks and, as a Methodist, felt it wrong to be an agent of them. The precise rules were changed over the years.
4. He would neither borrow nor lend. If the customer was buying in the shop, he must pay immediately. If he was distant, the traveller would see him every four weeks precisely and the account must then be fully settled. Samuel felt this was best for the customer as well as himself, because once you start to borrow, it is not clear where you should stop. He also saw, in practice, bad debt ripple through chains of businesses, ruining the families concerned and even damaging the country. He felt he was setting an example by demonstrating what could be done without borrowing. Writing in 2010, this sounds all too familiar!
5. Tact, Push, Principle. Samuel worked that way himself and only recruited those who showed these three qualities. Principle applied to both masters and men. It meant honest dealing with customers as well as masters. A master must not force his man to a target that could not be honestly reached, with the message, "I don't want to know how you get it done, just do it". If the master does not want to know how the target is met, he is more guilty than the minion who actually breaks the rules. Principle can be hard to discover but Samuel could find it. He once visited a grocer, noticed one man in particular and quickly said to his host, "I would not keep him for a day". The host thought the man was his best employee but he watched him, and in time caught him stealing and dismissed him. The man continued to go downhill. Working for another master, he stole by the wagon-load.
6. He believed you must only supply ingredients as described. Pepper was highly taxed. There was an established practice in the trade of adulterating ground pepper with "Pepper Dust" (P.D.). It was a standard product which grocers bought. The practice was harmless but dishonest. Early on Samuel had accepted this practice as standard but he thought about it more and more. Finally, having made the decision, he went back one night and threw away his stock of P.D.
7. He made sure to know all his employees, however humble. He befriended them almost as much as his own family. He tried to understand them and their families and their worries. He gave them all a free party at least once a year. Every young man who "lived in" had his own space, where he could sleep and pray in private.
8. Samuel consulted his whole family, including his wife, sister and children, if he had a difficult problem to resolve. If uncertainty remained then he would express his confidence that the Lord would deal with it. This helped the children to grow up morally as well as physically and enabled them, when the time came, to take command with confidence.
9. "Precision, order, energy and exactness are principles engraved on every department of the vast business here conducted." A "Wesleyan Minister" wrote this to the ‘’Christian Miscellany'’ for 1847.
10. "Make all you can, save all you can, give all you can" (John Wesley). Samuel was convinced that these went together and gave away his whole savings three times before he became a partner. This is a remarkable quality in a man who was so passionate about trading.
11. One principle was established later: not to speculate. The First Opium War broke out in 1839 and Samuel made a huge profit from tea. When the war ended in 1842, the price of tea plummeted and he lost it all again. He never tried it again, avoiding all the triumphs and disasters of the later railway mania.

He would not let his men impose upon him. If a man was in fault and confessed then he was quick to forgive but if he dissembled then Samuel would get the truth and then his rebuke could be tremendous, depending on the gravity of the offence.

During his tenure, Samuel significantly reduced working hours. At the start of his apprenticeship, nominal hours spanned from 6:00 a.m. to 9:00 p.m., with frequent extensions to 10:00 or 11:00 p.m. To shorten these grueling shifts, Samuel improved organizational efficiency and expanded the workforce. He gradually reduced the standard closing time to 8:30 p.m., then 7:00 p.m., and eventually 6:00 p.m. To combat persistent overtime, he introduced a rule requiring all staff to remain until the final worker finished. This policy incentivized the team to collectively correct system inefficiencies, ultimately bringing the standard closing time down to 5:00 or 5:30 p.m. Note that, in the UK, we buy goods from Third World countries where long hours are still an issue.

== His Principles of life ==
Samuel was a devout Christian. He lived life by the Christian principle, "Love your neighbour as yourself", as evidenced by his friendly treatment of his employees and neighbours in Kingswood.

When Henry Budgett began to trade in Kingswood, it was a lawless place with a labyrinth of lanes impossible to navigate without a guide and unsafe to pass alone even in daylight. It was inhabited by rogues and vagabonds (the Cock-Roadites) who ranged as far as Bath, Hereford and Gloucester. Henry began a campaign to make the place a bit more civilised, gradually gaining support from other people in and around Bristol. A few criminals were detected and removed but many remained. A Sunday school was opened on Cock Road in July 1812. It was surprisingly popular – 75 children came on the first day. On first arriving in Kingswood, Samuel joined in the work. At first his job was to visit the absentees and if possible bring them to school. He used a pony to cover the ground and often went without Sunday lunch. He enjoyed doing it. He continued to work for the school and other schools in the area for the rest of his life. In time he trained his sons and only daughter, and his more devout employees, in the same work .

One Sunday evening after preaching, Samuel passed a group of youths, wild, rough and ignorant and he persuaded them to come to tea next day at Kingswood chapel. It was a meeting of the tract distributors but he didn't mention that. They came and had their tea. He asked them if their friends might come to a bigger meeting (with tea) at his own house. They thought so and many youths were given tickets. At the second meeting, he knew they would try to bolt after tea so he forestalled that by offering 50 pounds to the meeting to be distributed as the meeting collectively thought fit. In no time at all the lads were manoeuvred into founding "Kingswood Young Men's Association" with some of them on the committee. Perhaps this was the master salesman deploying his commercial skills for God's purposes. The group progressed into a regular meeting on Sunday nights for religious instruction, and on weekday nights for secular instruction. A Young Women's Association was also founded on the same principles. These associations improved many young people and converted some.

He led funding for many chapels and schools in and near Kingswood and gave generously himself.

Arthur reports many individual cases of practical help for people in trouble. Here is one example, provided to Arthur by the Rev. John Gaskin. Samuel had noticed that one of his men seemed very sad. He called the man into his office and he said he was overwhelmed by debt and hard-put not to kill himself. Samuel made close enquiries and learned that the main cause was bills in connection with his wife's illness. He told the man that he thought the creditors could be induced to take half and that he had a friend who had given him the means to pay the other half. With this message he sent the man back to work. He then spent most of the day personally visiting the creditors and persuading them to accept half, reminding them that God had forgiven them their own debts to Him. We can well imagine the joy on the man's face towards the end of the day as he read all the receipts. But who was the friend? "You know that Friend as well as I do. .. go home to your wife and thank that Friend together for making you an independent man."

He believed that happiness and virtue were more important than anything else and that both could be found at the same time through a constant, open dialogue with God but not otherwise. He was more fortunate in this as a young man than later, when his responsibilities and temptations were greater. He constantly examined his own inner life and noted his many failures to reach the standards set and followed by Christ. In religious meetings he would confess these things openly, even when his own men were present. He struggled to reconcile the pressures of business with the demands of virtue and shared his struggles with the Lord and with his friends. At the same time most of his friends considered him to be one of the most virtuous people they knew. He spent time warning and guiding others away from sin and towards virtue. He was not afraid to walk into a group of wild men and gently lead them back towards virtue.

== Illness and death ==
As 1850 approached its close, Samuel Budgett was a man in an enviable position. His children were launched. His business was prospering and generally accepted as sound. His social circle was extending and he had time available to spend as he wished. Just then, at 56, the first signs of mortality appeared. He walked up one of the Bristol hills and found it hard work. Soon even the stairs became a trial. He was in heart failure and his life was at serious risk.

He was content in himself, but felt strongly that he had not loved and obeyed his Saviour as much as he should have done. Others would have disagreed, no one is perfect and he felt his failures acutely. Gradually he came to see this as one of the reasons why salvation is offered and then he was joyful again.

He had many visits from friends and family and received and gave much encouragement and prayer.

In the diary which he maintained he wrote, "April 13th....I feel that every thing which has been well done and prospered is that in which I was prompted and guided and assisted by my heavenly Father, and that which failed was when I leaned upon my own efforts and endeavours and then they proved weak and powerless."

Samuel died on 29 April 1851 at his home The Park, Tabernacle Road, Kingswood. William Arthur was in Bristol on that day and he went to Kingswood to attend the funeral, which was on 7 May. He reports the events in his book. He says the procession began at Samuel's home. It included 200 men and boys, walking in pairs. Outside the property all shops were closed and all houses had their blinds drawn down. A dense crowd stood outside the gates and along the road to the chapel, which was soon full, with more people outside. Arthur (who was an Irishman) tells us that he had never seen such a large collective expression of grief, even in Ireland, except for Paris in 1848, at the mass funeral of those killed in the battles of June. He spoke to many individuals and heard stories of Samuel's acts of kindness to them .

== Family ==
Samuel married Ann Smith (1791–1860) on 9 May 1822. They had children as follows:

James Smith Budgett (1823–1906) who married Mary Bolton Farmer on 18 October 1849. For some period between 1863 and 1913 they lived on an estate in Ealing, London called Ealing Park. Later they moved to Stoke Park in Guildford, Surrey.

Sarah Ann Budgett (1824–1828)

Elizabeth Budgett (1826–1826). She died aged one month.

William Henry Budgett (1827–1900) who married Ann J Lidgett (1839–1936) on 1 October 1862. From 1869 they lived at Stoke House, Stoke Bishop, Bristol.

Edwin Budgett (1829–1849). He was a healthy young man who died suddenly of Cholera. William Arthur, presumably quoting a member of the family, wrote, "Frank, vivacious, open, with a clear head, a quick glance, a commanding look, prompt, firm action, a hearty laugh, a mellow voice, and a musical taste which .... would sometimes make the place joyful....".

Samuel Budgett (1831–1904) who married Sarah Hannah Brogden (1834–1908), daughter of John Brogden who was a railway contractor, iron master and coal master. In the late nineteenth century they lived at Cotham House, Cotham, Bristol, an estate of about four acres. After Samuel lost his appeal in the case Billing vs Brogden, he left the family firm, they moved to a modest house in Beckenham and he started his own business in London.

Sarah Ann Budgett (1832–1906) who married Edward Ebenezer Meakin (1838–1897) on 29 November 1864, Calcutta. Like Sarah, Edward was a Methodist and was a tea planter in Almora, India at the time of their marriage. They returned to England because of serious business losses and lived in Red Hill. They had 5 children. In 1882 they moved to Morocco as his health was not good and the drier climate there was recommended. Edward Ebenezer founded the Times of Morocco, the first English language newspaper, because he was horrified at the corruption and maltreatment of the poor by the rulers and expatriates. Their son James Edward Budgett Meakin took over the paper when Edward became ill and returned to England. He became an authority on Morocco. Sarah and Edward's oldest daughter, Annette Mary was a gifted writer and traveller, known best for her book "The Ribbon of Iron" describing her journey on the Trans-Siberian railway with her mother in 1900. Their second son, Harold was a physician with the Indian Medical Service and received awards for his service in 2 military campaigns. Their second daughter, Ethilda, was a physician, and became Physician-in-Charge of the Women's and Children's Hospital in Calcutta. She married, returned to England, became a psychoanalyst and had 4 children. Edward and Sarah's youngest son, Sidney, emigrated to Canada but joined the forces in World War I, was seriously wounded and suffered from shell shock.

All the above marriages have descendants still living in 2013 including Richard Budgett. Arthur Budgett and John Samuel Budgett were also descendents.

== See also ==
- List of grocers

== Sources ==
=== The Successful Merchant ===
- Arthur, William (1852), The Successful Merchant, London, United Kingdom: Hamilton, Adams & Co., Download Available.

This is the principal source of published information about Samuel Budgett. It ran into many editions. For example, the 43rd UK edition was published in 1878, London and Belfast by William Mullan and Son.

In the United States there were editions by many publishers, including:

  - Swormstedt & Poe – Cincinnati – 1856, "Methodist Tract Society"
  - Carlton & Phillips, New York, 1853
  - D. Appleton, New York, 1857
  - Publishing House of the M. E. Church, South, Nashville, Tn., 1894.

In the Preface, Arthur says, "The design of this volume is to furnish a work wherein an actual and a remarkable life is traced in relation to Commerce.... to be a friendly, familiar ‘’book for the busy'’, to which men from the counting-house or the shop might turn, feeling that it concerned them, and for which they might possibly be the better here and hereafter." SM page vii.

=== Other sources ===
- Dictionary of National Biography, 1886, Volume 7 (Brown – Burthogge), Samuel Budgett
- Peter Wardley, Dictionary of National Biography, 2004, Samuel Budgett
