= Escuerzo =

In English, escuerzo can refer to many different frog species, either individually or collectively, in South American families Ceratophryidae and Odontophrynidae. Specifically, it is the collective English name for the genus Odontophrynus. In Spanish, it can refer to any of the species in genus Lepidobatrachus, but as its meaning is similar to "toad", it can at least informally refer to many other species too.
