= John Graham Kerr =

British politician (1869–1957)

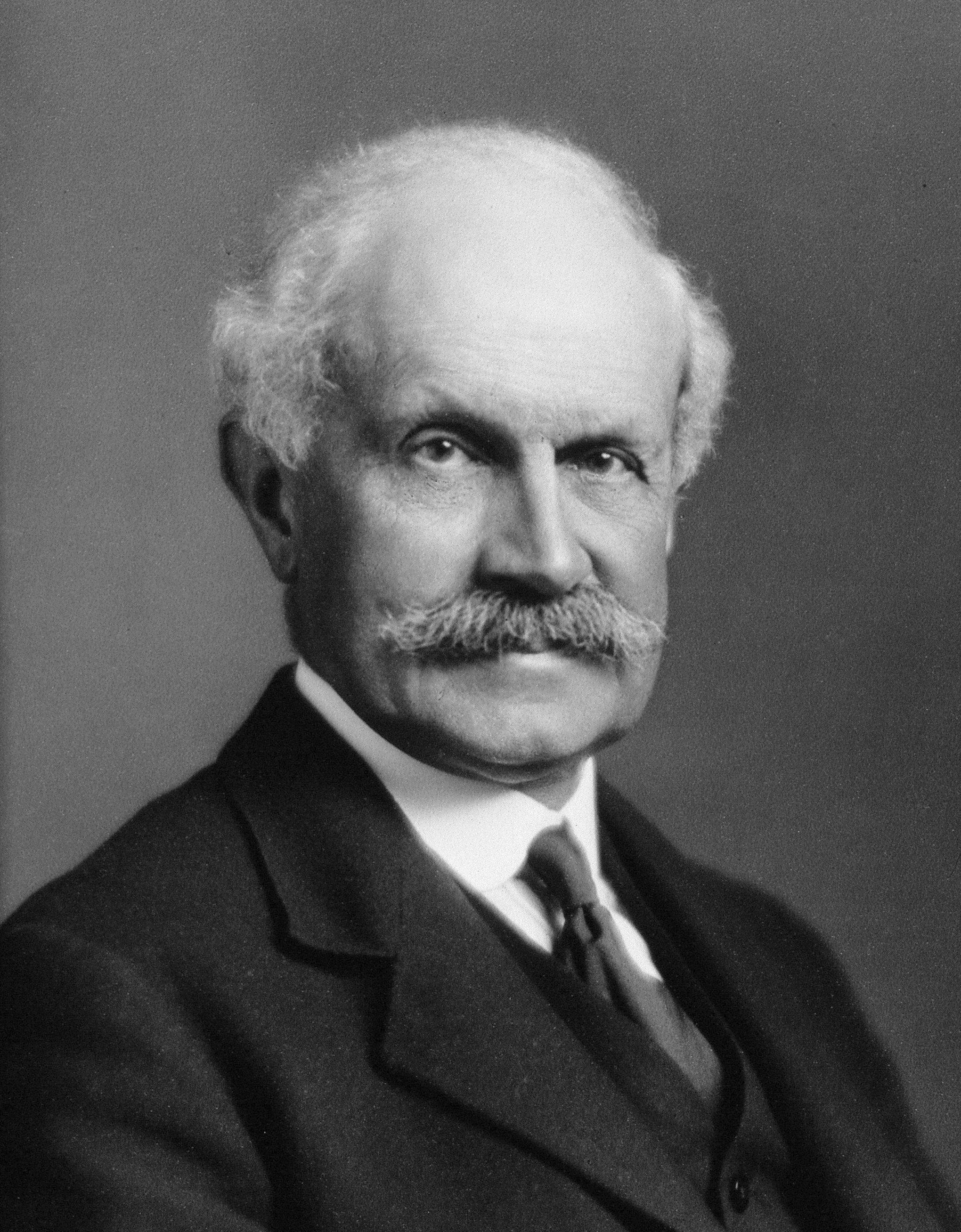
- Born: 18 September 1869; Arkley, England
- Died: 21 April 1957 (aged 87); Royston, England
- Education: University of Edinburgh; Christ's College, Cambridge
- Known for: embryology of lungfishes, dazzle camouflage
- Awards: Linnean Medal (1955); Fellow of the Royal Society
- Scientific career
- Fields: embryology, camouflage

Notes
- MP for Combined Scottish Universities

Sir John Graham Kerr FRS FRSE FLS FZS (18 September 1869 – 21 April 1957), known to his friends as Graham Kerr, was a British embryologist and Unionist Member of Parliament (MP). He is best known for his studies of the embryology of lungfishes. He was involved in ship camouflage in the First World War, and his pupil Hugh B. Cott influenced military camouflage in the Second World War.

== Early life ==
He was born at Rowley Lodge, in Arkley in Hertfordshire, to Scottish parents: James Kerr, former Principal of Hooghly College in Calcutta, and his wife, Sybella Graham.

Kerr was educated at the Royal High School, Edinburgh, and then studied medicine at the University of Edinburgh.

== Zoology ==
Kerr interrupted his medical studies to join an Argentinian expedition to study the natural history of the Pilcomayo River. On his return, he studied natural sciences at Christ's College, Cambridge, graduating with first class honours in 1896. The Argentinian expedition had ended with the loss of most of the collections, but after graduating he mounted an expedition to the Gran Chaco, bringing home a large collection of material related to the South American lungfish, Lepidosiren paradoxa. Kerr was accompanied by John Samuel Budgett, who studied the frogs of the area and discovered a new genus.

After a period acting as Demonstrator in the Animal Morphology lectures at Christ's College, Cambridge (1898 to 1902), he was appointed in August 1902 as Regius Professor of Natural History in the University of Glasgow replacing John Young. Kerr stayed until 1935 when he was succeeded by Prof Edward Hindle. Kerr was particularly interested in teaching medical students, and published widely.

In 1903, he was elected a Fellow of the Royal Society of Edinburgh. His proposers were Sir Isaac Bayley Balfour, James Cossar Ewart, Frederick Orpen Bower, and James Geikie. He won the Society's Neill Prize in 1904. He served as the Society's vice president from 1928 to 1931.

He was President of the Royal Physical Society of Edinburgh from 1906 to 1909, and elected a Fellow of the Royal Society in 1909. He received LLDs from the University of Edinburgh in 1935 and the University of St Andrews in 1950.

== Camouflage ==
Kerr made early contributions to ship camouflage in the First World War. He wrote to First Lord of the Admiralty Winston Churchill on 24 September 1914, advocating camouflage by disruptive coloration — breaking up outlines with patches of strongly contrasting tone — and countershading — shading guns into invisibility with lighter paint below, darker paint above. Kerr openly supported the controversial camouflage claims of American artist Abbott Handerson Thayer. Kerr's aim was to make ships difficult to spot and fool range finders by disrupting their outlines, or in his own words "to destroy completely the continuity of outlines by splashes of white", to make ships harder to hit with gunfire at long range. Kerr's principle was applied to ships in various ways, but Kerr found it difficult to promote or control the use of his camouflage ideas, and they fell out of favour after Churchill's departure from the Admiralty. The Royal Navy reverted to plain grey. A rival proposal for disruptive camouflage emerged in 1917 from the marine artist Norman Wilkinson. Wilkinson, unlike Kerr, had little difficulty fitting in with the naval establishment, and was put in charge of a large-scale program of painting ships in disruptive patterns that became known as "Dazzle camouflage". After the war, Kerr engaged in an unsuccessful legal dispute over the credit for creating dazzle camouflage. Wilkinson successfully promoted the false idea that Kerr's camouflage sought invisibility rather than image disruption.

Kerr again influenced British camouflage in the Second World War, this time through his pupil Hugh B. Cott.

== Politics and late life ==
Kerr was elected as Unionist MP for the Combined Scottish Universities at a by-election in 1935 after the MP and novelist John Buchan resigned his seat when he was appointed as Governor General of Canada. After his election to Parliament, Kerr resigned his professorship, and moved to Hertfordshire. He held the seat until the university constituencies were abolished for the 1950 general election, serving for a time as Chairman of the Parliamentary and Scientific Committee.

He was knighted in the King's Birthday Honours in 1939.

The University of St Andrews awarded him an honorary doctorate (LLD) in 1950.

He died on 21 April 1957 at Barley House in Royston, Hertfordshire.

== Family ==
He married twice. First, in 1903, to Elizabeth Mary Kerr. She died in 1934. He remarried in 1936 to Isabella Dunn Clapperton (née Macindoe), a widow.

== Legacy ==
The Zoology Building of the University of Glasgow was renamed the Graham Kerr Building in his name.

== Publications ==
- Textbook of Embryology with the Exception of Mammals (1919)
- Zoology for Medical Students (1921)
- Evolution (1926)
- An Introduction to Zoology (1929)

Parliament of the United Kingdom
Preceded by Noel Skelton and George Morrison; John Buchan	Member of Parliament for the Combined Scottish Universities; 1935–1950; With: George Morrison, to 1943; Noel Skelton, to Nov 1935; Ramsay MacDonald, 1936–1937; Sir John Anderson, 1938–1950; John Boyd Orr, 1945–1946; Walter Elliot, 1946–1950	Constituency abolished
