= Annette Meakin =

British travel author (1867–1959)

Annette Mary Budgett Meakin
- Born: 12 August 1867; Bristol, England
- Died: 26 July 1959 (aged 91); Chipping Ongar, Essex, England
- Occupations: Traveller and author

Annette Mary Budgett Meakin (1867–1959) was a British travel author. She and her mother were the first English women to travel to Japan via the Trans-Siberian Railway.

== Life ==
Annette M. B. Meakin was born on 12 August 1867. Her parents were Edward Ebenezer and Sarah (née Budgett) Meakin. Her father worked as a tea planter in Almora in India then founded an English-speaking newspaper in Tangier, Times of Morocco. Her brother, James Edward Budgett Meakin was a journalist, her sister Ethilda Budgett Meakin Herford was a doctor and psychoanalyst.

She went to school in England and in Germany, studying music at the Royal College of Music, Kensington, and the Stern Conservatoire, Berlin, and classics at University College London (UCL). Her instructors at UCL included the classicist and poet A. E. Housman. Housman supplied a reference for her in 1900, commending her for enthusiasm "such as I have seldom known" and for her "zeal" at composing Latin prose and verse. The two continued to correspond until shortly before Housman's death in 1936. During World War I Meakin took the job of a chemist's assistant but writing was her career. She was made an honorary member of the Goethe Society of Weimar for her scholarly work on the friendship of Goethe and Schiller, written in three volumes.

She and her mother, Sarah Meakin, were the first English women to travel to Japan on board the Trans-Siberian Railway. They left London in January 1900 and they arrived in Russia on 21 May 1900 after delaying for a time in Paris. Annette noted that they had reduced their joint luggage to just three pieces. She wrote an account that was published the following year. Her book "A Ribbon of Iron" also described their stop-overs in Omsk, Tomsk, Krasnoyarsk and for a trip on the nearby Yenisei River which flows to the Arctic Ocean. Her book, The Ribbon of Iron was extensively quoted in the book of Harmon Tupper, To the Great Ocean – Siberia and the Trans-Siberian Railway, published in London by Secker & Warburg in 1965.

She successfully sued another author for plagiarizing her book on Galicia in 1921. In 1912 Catherine Gasquoine Hartley published The Story of Santiago de Compostela. Hartley and her publisher were successfully sued for plagiarism by Meakin. She showed that Hartley's book was too similar to her book Galicia, the Switzerland of Spain. As part of the settlement Hartley's book was removed from libraries.

Meakin died in 1959. She donated her papers to the Bodleian Library.

== Selected works ==
- A Ribbon Of Iron, 1901
- In Russian Turkestan: A Garden of Asia, 1903
- Russia Travels and Studies, 1906
- Woman In Transition, 1907
- Galicia, The Switzerland Of Spain, 1909
- Hannah More, 1911
- What America Is Doing, Letters From The New World, 1911
- Enlistment Or Conscription?, 1914
- Nausikaa, 1926/1938
- Polyeuctes, 1929
- Goethe and Schiller: 1785–1805 The Story of a Friendship in three volumes, 1932
