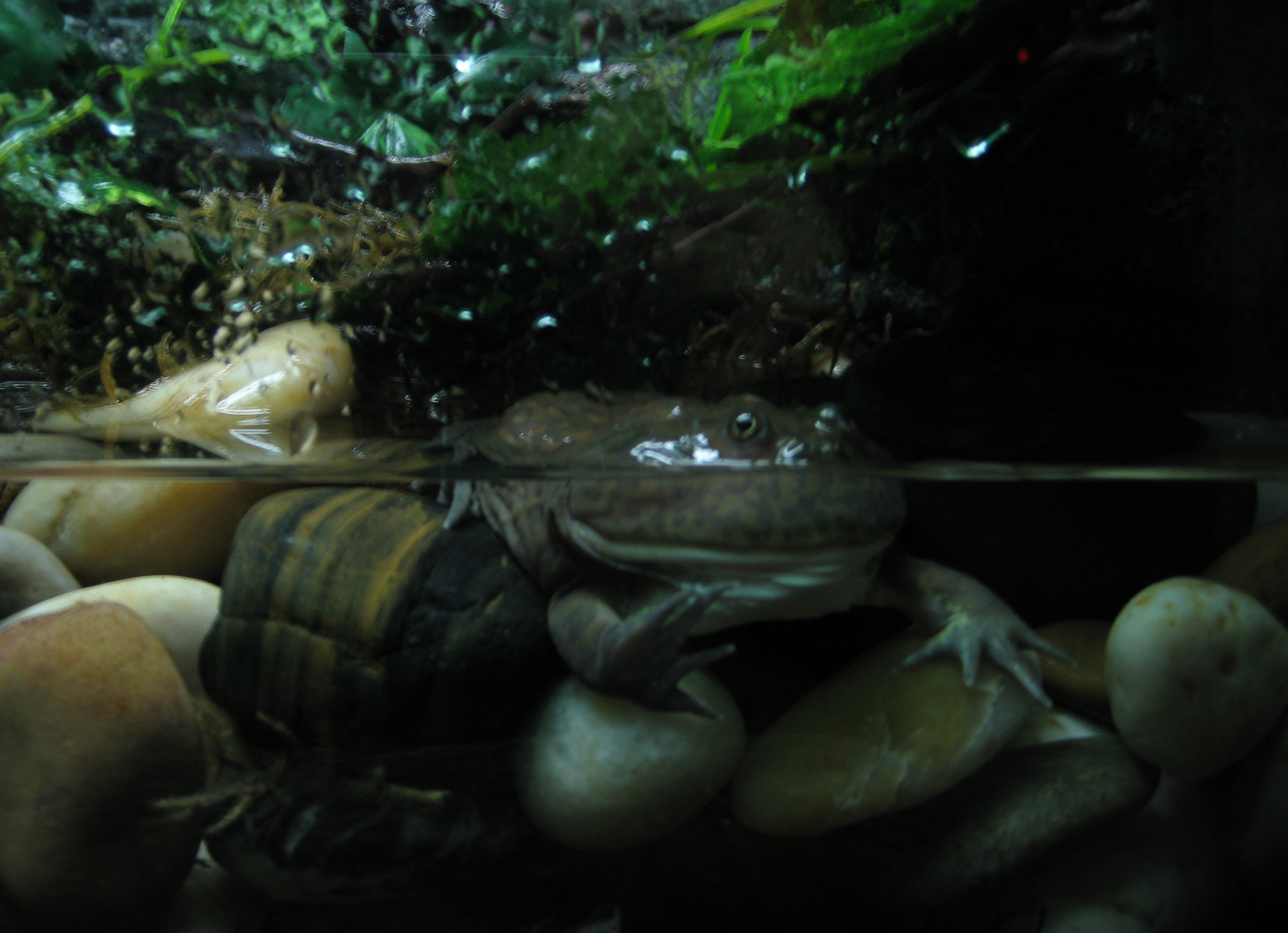

Conservation status
- Least Concern (IUCN 3.1)

Scientific classification
- Kingdom: Animalia
- Phylum: Chordata
- Class: Amphibia
- Order: Anura
- Family: Ceratophryidae
- Genus: Lepidobatrachus
- Species: L. llanensis

Binomial name
- Lepidobatrachus llanensis Reig and Cei, 1963

= Lepidobatrachus llanensis =

Species of amphibian

Lepidobatrachus llanensis (common name: llanos frog; in Spanish: escuerzo) is a species of frogs in the family Ceratophryidae. It is found in northern Argentina, western Paraguay, and southern Bolivia.

== Habitat and ecology ==
Lepidobatrachus llanensis is an aquatic frog inhabiting dry scrubland and semi-arid areas at elevations below 300 m (980 ft). Breeding takes place in temporary pools and water tanks on cattle farms. During the dry season these frogs burrow underground, only to emerge again after rain. To deal with dry conditions, they form a protective cocoon that greatly reduces the loss of water.

== Conservation ==
Lepidobatrachus llanensis is an uncommon frog living in isolated populations. It is threatened by habitat loss caused by expanding agriculture, wood extraction, and pollution. It occurs in a number of protected areas in Argentina and Paraguay.
