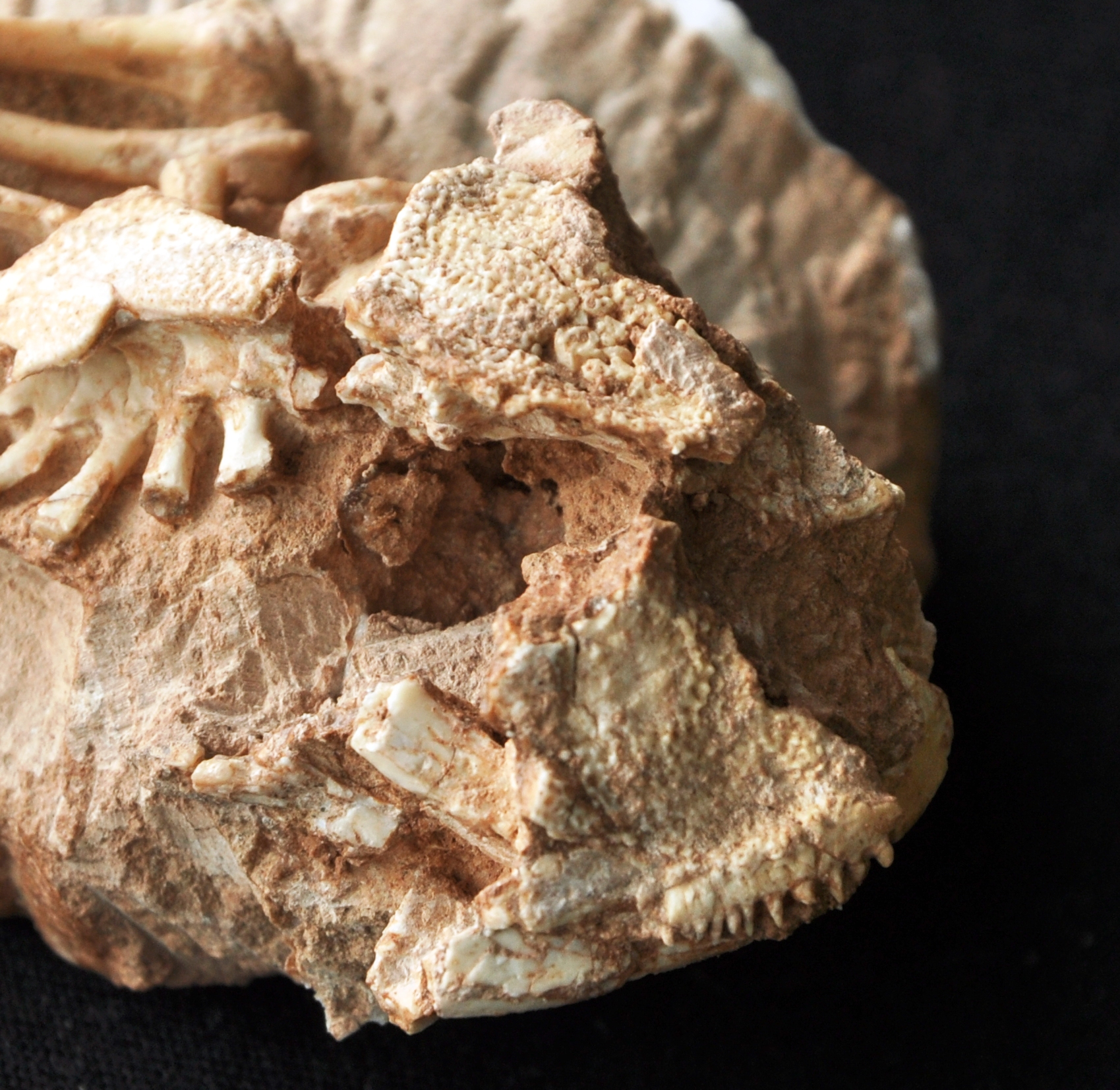
- Holotype specimen
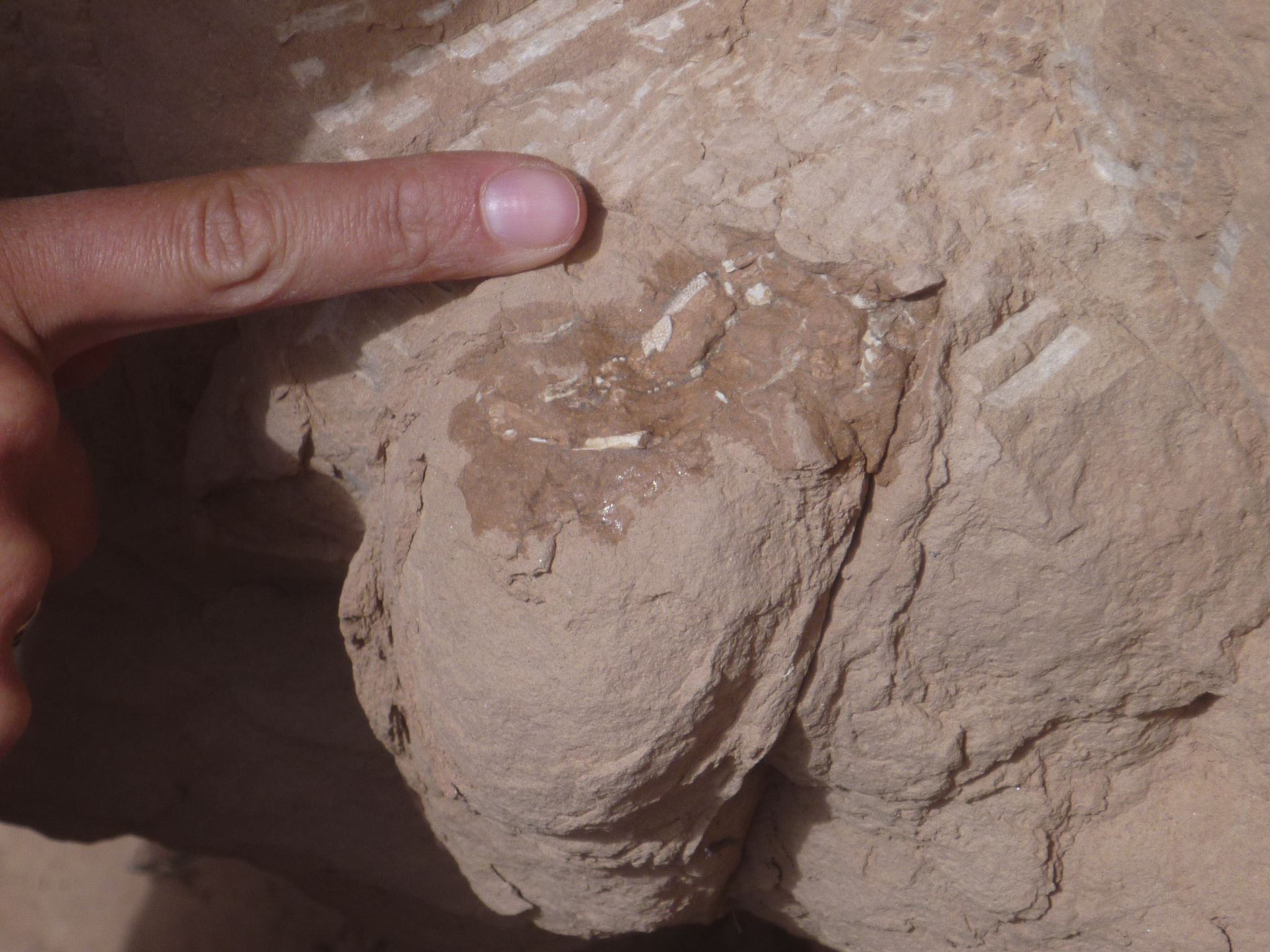
- Holotype specimen before it was prepared

Scientific classification
- Kingdom: Animalia
- Phylum: Chordata
- Class: Amphibia
- Order: Anura
- Family: Ceratophryidae
- Genus: Lepidobatrachus
- Species: †L. dibumartinez

Binomial name
- †Lepidobatrachus dibumartinez Turazzini & Gómez, 2023

= Lepidobatrachus dibumartinez =

Lepidobatrachus dibumartinez Temporal range: Late Miocene–Early Pliocene

Extinct species of frog

Lepidobatrachus dibumartinez is an extinct species of frog in the family Ceratophryidae that was found in the Late Miocene-Early Pliocene Tunuyán Formation of Argentina.

L. dibumartinez is known only from the holotype, IANIGLA-PV 112, an articulated skeleton that was prepared between May and November 2014, and it had a large kite shaped dorsal dermal shield and a deep facial groove on its maxilla.

The epithet honours Argentine footballer Emiliano Martínez, who is also known as "Dibu Martínez", for playing a pivotal role as a goalkeeper in winning the 2022 FIFA World Cup with the Argentina national football team.
