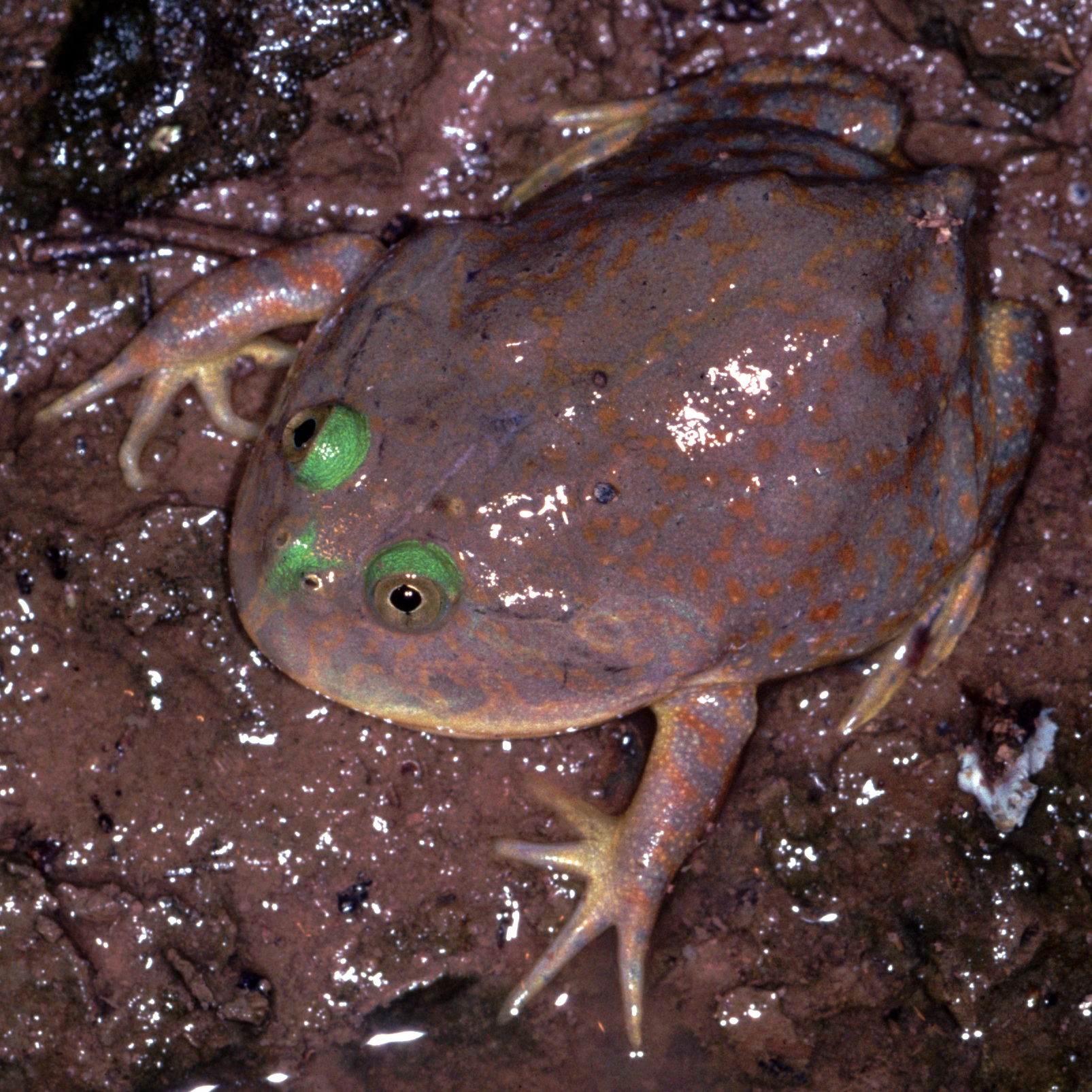

Conservation status
- Least Concern (IUCN 3.1)

Scientific classification
- Kingdom: Animalia
- Phylum: Chordata
- Class: Amphibia
- Order: Anura
- Family: Ceratophryidae
- Genus: Lepidobatrachus
- Species: L. asper

Binomial name
- Lepidobatrachus asper Budgett, 1899

Synonyms
- Ceratophrys aspera — Boulenger, 1919; Lepidobatrachus salinicola Reig and Cei, 1963

= Lepidobatrachus asper =

Species of frog

Lepidobatrachus asper (common name: Paraguay horned frog) is a species of frog in the family Ceratophryidae. It is found in the Chaco of northern Argentina and Paraguay. Record from Mato Grosso do Sul in southern Brazil is in error.

This frog inhabits dry scrubland and semi-arid areas at elevations below 200 m (660 ft). Breeding takes place in temporary pools and water tanks on cattle farms. During the dry season these frogs burrow underground, only to emerge again after rain. It can be threatened by habitat loss due to deforestation and by fires.
