= Ethilda Herford =

English gynaecologist and psychoanalyst (1872–1956)

- Born: Ethilda Meakin; 1872
- Died: 1956 (aged 83–84)
- Education: University of London
- Occupations: Hospital physician Psychoanalyst
- Relatives: James Edward Budgett Meakin, Annette Meakin(siblings)

Ethilda Budgett-Meakin Herford (née Meakin, formerly called Haarbleicher, 1872 – 1956) was an English gynaecologist and psychoanalyst. After running hospitals in India, she became an early practitioner of psychoanalysis in England.

== Life ==
Ethilda was born in 1872 to Edward Meakin, editor of an English-language newspaper in Morocco, and his wife Sarah, née Budgett. Her siblings were journalist James Edward Budgett Meakin and travel writer Annette Meakin, who was the first English woman to travel to Japan on the Trans-Siberian Railway along with their mother.

Ethilda was educated at the North London Collegiate School, and prepared for medical training by working for two years with a mission charity in the slums of Glasgow. She received an M.B. in 1898 and a B.S. in 1899, both from the Royal Free Hospital school of the University of London. She then worked as Assistant Medical Officer in St Giles Infirmary, Camberwell and Grove Hospital, Tooting.

In 1902, Dr Meakin went to India to run the Zenana Mission Women's Hospital. She held positions including acting physician of Coma Hospital, Bombay, in 1902, and Superintendent of the Victoria Hospital for Women and Children in Calcutta, 1907–9. While in India she published articles on gynaecology.

In 1907, she married violinist Oscar Haarbleicher. They had three sons and a daughter, two of whom also became doctors. In 1917, they returned to England and settled in Reading. They changed their name to Herford during World War I.

== Psychoanalysis ==
Having become interested in psychoanalysis through reading the works of Freud, Dr Herford trained in psychoanalysis with Karl Abraham in Berlin and with Sándor Ferenczi in 1923. She contributed to the activities of Jessie Murray’s Medico-Psychological Clinic in Brunswick Square, which offered psychotherapy to those traumatised by World War I. In 1926, she worked as a physician at the London Clinic of Psychoanalysis. In 1934 she became a member of the British Psycho-Analytic Society, where she had been an associate member since 1921. She then became a director of the British Hospital for Functional Nervous Disorders in Camden Town and worked at the Institute for the Scientific Treatment of Delinquency. She translated some of Freud’s essays into English.

== Select publications ==
- 'Medical work among the women of 'Little' Indur (Nizam), India.' Magazine of the London School of Medicine for Women and the Royal Free Hospital 5, 1903
- 'Intramural cysts of the uterus.' BJOG: An International Journal of Obstetrics & Gynaecology 17 (3), 1910, 208–229
- 'Conservative operations upon the internal female genital organs, with special reference to the operation of Dührssen-Beuttner.' BJOG: An International Journal of Obstetrics & Gynaecology 18 (3), 1910, 188–193
- 'Notes of sixteen unselected cases of hebosteotormy from the Kliniks of Berlin, Munich, and Königsberg.' BJOG: An International Journal of Obstetrics & Gynaecology 19 (3), 1911, 307–330
- 'The infantile mind and its relations to social problems and mental hygiene.' Journal of State Medicine 36, 1928, 139–148
