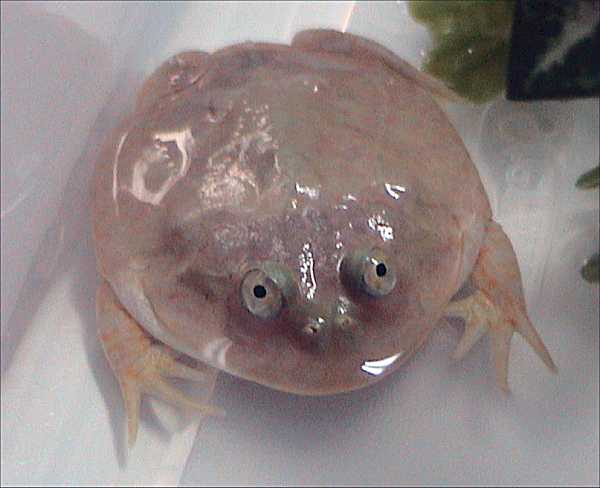
- Lepidobatrachus laevis in shallow water

Conservation status
- Least Concern (IUCN 3.1)

Scientific classification
- Kingdom: Animalia
- Phylum: Chordata
- Class: Amphibia
- Order: Anura
- Family: Ceratophryidae
- Genus: Lepidobatrachus
- Species: L. laevis

Binomial name
- Lepidobatrachus laevis Budgett, 1899

= Lepidobatrachus laevis =

Species of amphibian

Lepidobatrachus laevis, widely known as Budgett's frog, is a species of frog in the family Ceratophryidae, discovered by John Samuel Budgett. It is often kept as a pet. It has acquired a number of popular nicknames, including hippo frog, Freddy Krueger frog, and escuerzo de agua.

== Description ==
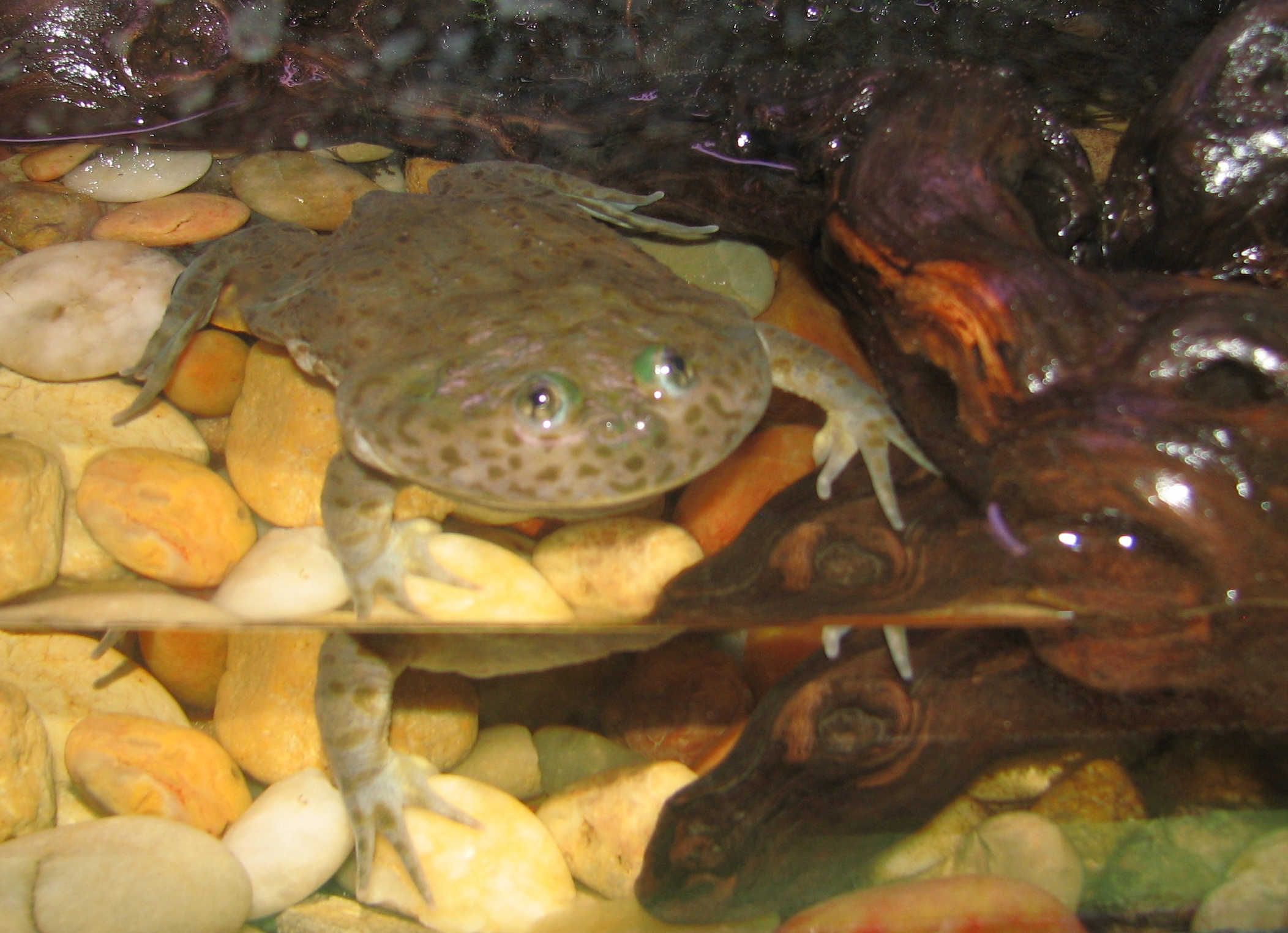
Lepidobatrachus laevis photographed at Newport Aquarium

This frog has become popular in pet stores due to its comical flat appearance and intelligent behavior. Females reach a size of 100 millimetres (3.9 in) while males sometimes only grow half as large. They have a large head that makes up to 1/3 of the body, with a notably large mouth. Their mouth contains a top row of teeth and two "fangs" on the lower jaw. They have extremely short and stubby limbs and the forelimbs are unwebbed. L. laevis is dark olive green with darker blotches outlined in orange. The males have a dark blue throat.

== Diet and behavior ==
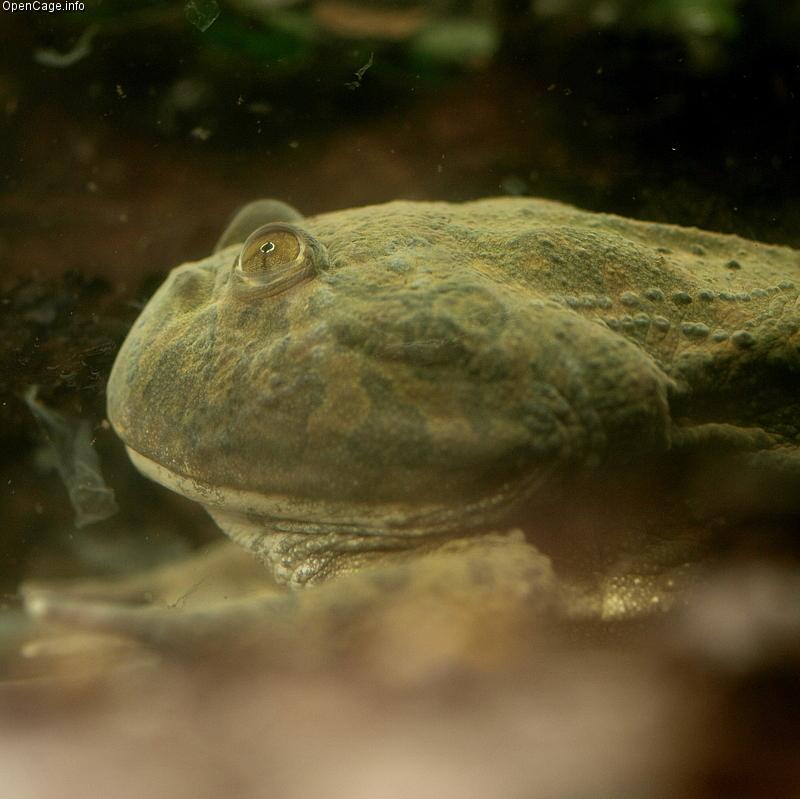
Lepidobatrachus laevis photographed at Kyoto Aquarium

The wide-mouth frog is well adapted to its environment, notably the harsh winter. During this time it will remain inactive underground in a cocoon of shed dead skin which protects it from losing water until it emerges. This species is generally very aggressive and will puff up when threatened to appear larger. If this behavior does not deter the intruder they will make a shrill screech, bite, and corner the target. They are nocturnal and hunt at night, submerged up to their nostrils waiting for prey to pass by. They then lunge and swallow the prey whole. They feed on other frogs, insects, and snails. Both adults and tadpoles of the species are known to be occasional cannibals. The tadpoles of this species are obligate carnivores that swallow their prey whole. The diet of L. laevis tadpoles is similar to that of adults and includes snails, insects, other tadpoles, and crustaceans. They have a different gut morphology than non-carnivorous tadpoles.

== Reproduction ==
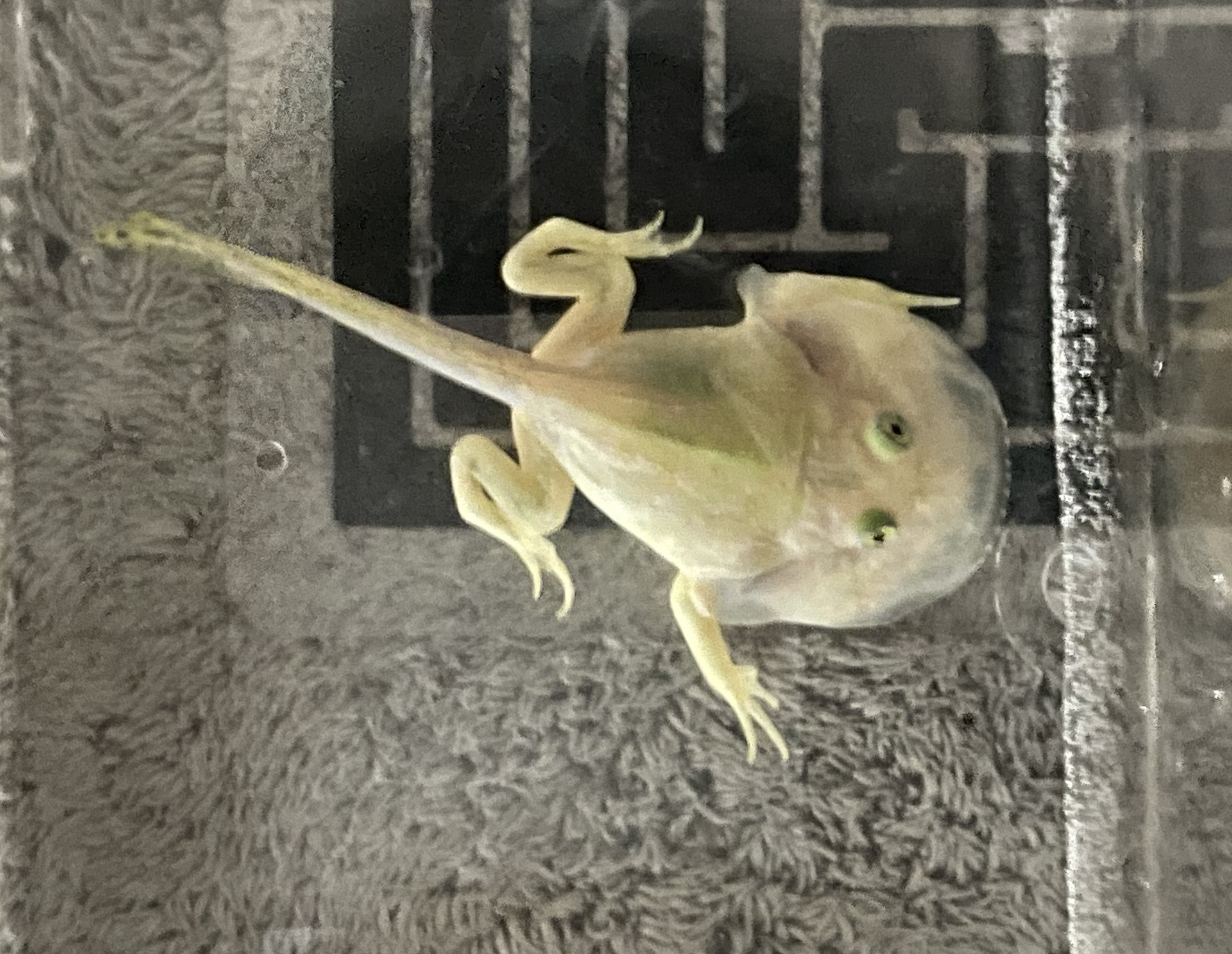
Immature form

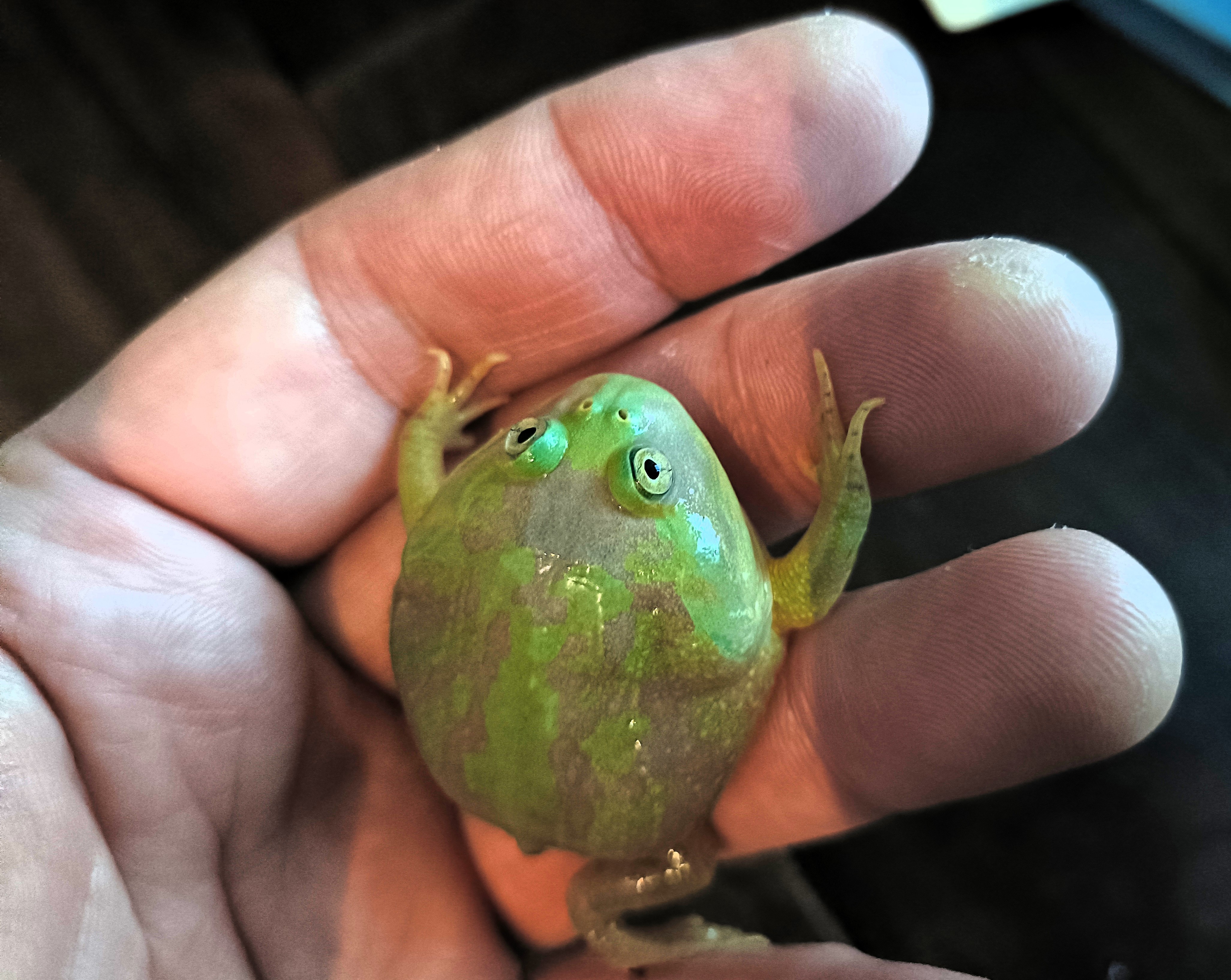
6 weeks after birth

L. laevis can produce up to 1400 eggs in a single mating. A pair will reproduce and deposit a mass of fertilized eggs in temporary pools of water. The embryo develops at a rapid rate over two weeks, in order to metamorphize into mobile adolescent form before the breeding pool dries up. The tadpoles are carnivores and cannibalistic at the time of hatching and have nearly adult jaws. They sexually mature in about a year.

== Distribution and conservation ==
It is commonly observed in Paraguay and Bolivia, and less frequently in Argentina. Its natural habitats are the dry and wet Chaco. Breeding may take place in shallow temporary pools and artificial ponds. It is in some areas threatened by habitat loss but there is a large total population size. The species is listed as Least Concern in view of its relatively wide distribution, presumed large population, and because it is unlikely to be declining rapidly enough to qualify for listing in a more threatened category.

== Captivity ==
These frogs are often kept by keepers with mild experience with frogs or advanced owners. A ten to twenty gallon tank is generally recommended, without aquarium gravel because it causes digestive issues. River stones are a better alternative. Rocks should be sloped to allow the frog to exit the water. They do not require special heating in houses with a comfortable temperature of about 72 °F (22 °C). This species of frog needs to be kept alone or with members of the same species and of equal size, as they will consume anything smaller than themselves.
