= James Edward Budgett Meakin =

English journalist (1866–1906)

James Edward Budgett Meakin (8 August 1866 – 26 June 1906) was an English journalist. He wrote extensively about Morocco, and was concerned with the working conditions of workers in the United Kingdom.

== Biography ==
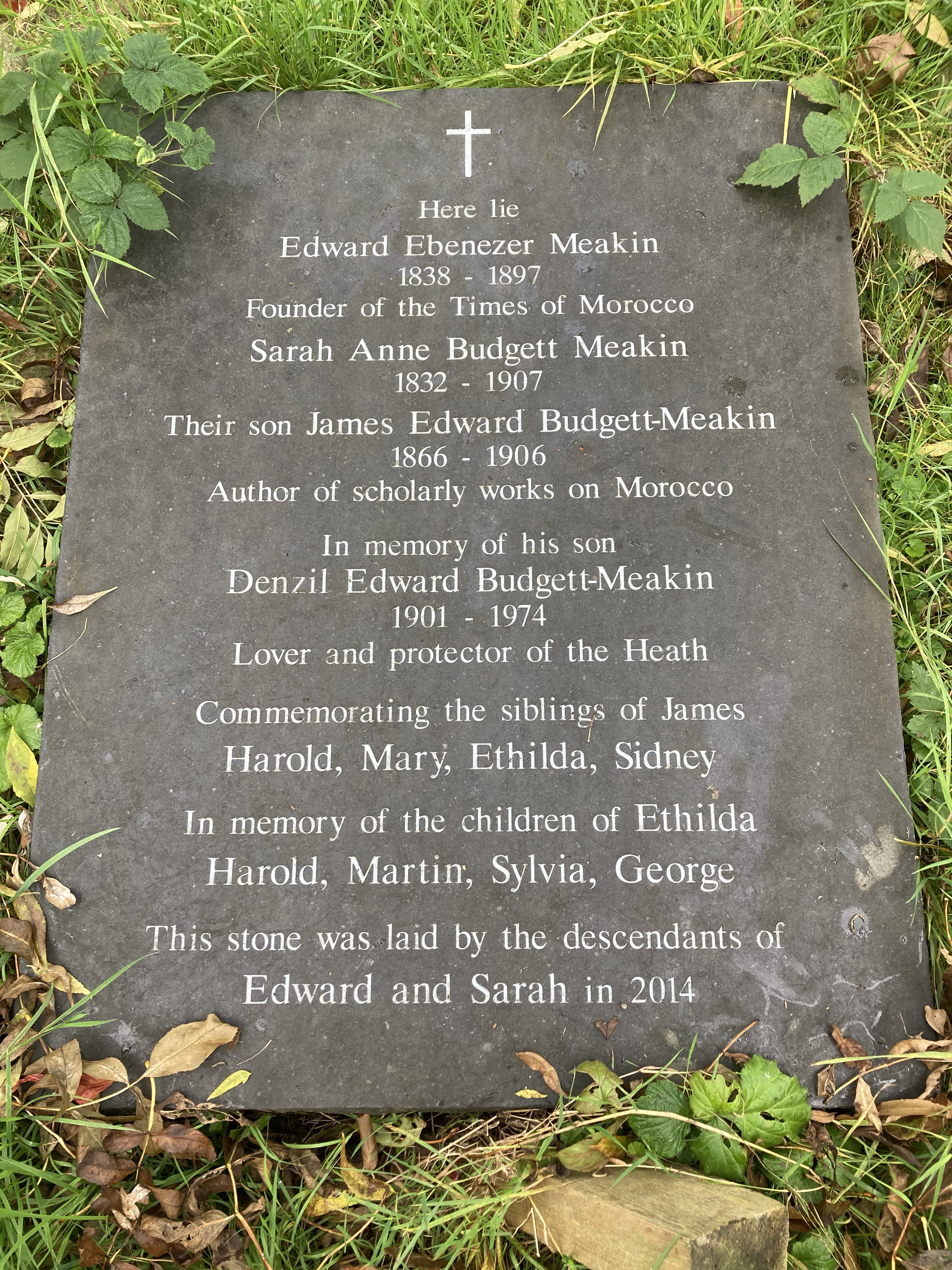
Family grave of James Edward Budgett Meakin in Highgate Cemetery

He was born in London, the son of Edward Ebenezer Meakin (1838–1897), tea planter in India and later a journalist, and his wife, Sarah Ann Budgett (1832–1906). He was educated at Reigate grammar school. His mother was the daughter of Samuel Budgett (1794–1851), an English merchant.

In 1884 Meakin's father settled in Tangier, Morocco, and founded the first English newspaper in Morocco, the Times of Morocco. At first the paper was published monthly, and from 1886 on a weekly basis. James joined his father in Morocco and started to work on the paper as assistant editor, and from 1888 as the paper's editor.

James was fascinated by the people and culture of Morocco and soon after his arrival there he started to write about everything he saw and experienced. He adopted local clothes, gave himself a local name (Tahar bel Mikki) and learned the local customs and language. In 1891, at the age of 25, he published an English-Arabic dictionary – An Introduction to the Arabic of Morocco.

He returned to England in 1895, but his requests for funding his research were rejected, so he decided to go by himself to Morocco for one year, and then travelled another year in other countries (like Uzbekistan, Iraq and further East – to Japan). He returned to England once more in 1897 to write and edit his books. He published three comprehensive books about Morocco, which established his status as the leading authority in this field: The Moorish Empire (1899), The Land of the Moors (1901), The Moors (1902). In 1905 he published his fourth book about Morocco- Life in Morocco, and Glimpses Beyond. This book consisted of articles and other notes that were not published in his previous books. He also wrote the article on Morocco in the eleventh edition of Encyclopædia Britannica.

He was awarded the Order of the Medjidie by the Sultan of Turkey for his studies of Islam in 1902 and 1904, according to an obituary of Mr Budgett Meakin published in the "Chiswick Gazette" on 6 July 1906.

In addition to his books and his work at the Times of Morocco, his articles were published in newspapers and journals in England and US, including The Jewish Chronicle, The London Tribune, The Fortnightly Review. His books and articles describe the local Moorish society, its habits and customs in great detail. During his stay in Morocco he was involved in the local politics and social life. His articles in the Jewish Chronicle exemplify his concerns regarding Morocco, its future, society and minorities (Jews).

In addition, he was involved in establishing the anti-sweat league and dealt with social reforms in England, such as the working class situation, and city slum conditions. In 1903 he investigated the working class conditions in several cities in the US and in 1905 published his book "Model Factories and Villages". James died on 28 June 1906 at the age of 39 and is buried in the East side of Highgate Cemetery along with his parents.

== Personal life ==
James married Kate Alberta Helliwell from Chicago on 6 June 1900, and they had one son, Denzil Edward Budgett-Meakin (1901–1974). They lived in Hampstead, north London. His siblings distinguished themselves in several fields. His sister, Annette Mary Budgett Meakin, was made an honorary member of the Goethe Society of Weimar for her scholarly work on the friendship of Goethe and Schiller, written in three volumes. She and her mother were the first Englishwomen to travel to Japan on the Trans-Siberian Railway and her book, The Ribbon of Iron, describes this experience.

His brother, Harold (1870–1907) was a physician in the Indian Medical Service and was awarded the Military Order of the Dragon for organising a field hospital at the relief of Peking and the Waziristan Medal at the blockade of Waziristan.

His sister Dr. Ethilda Budgett Meakin Herford (1872–1956), was Medical Superintendent of the Victoria Hospital for Women in Calcutta from 1904 to 1907 before she married and had four children. She later studied psychoanalysis and became Director of the British Hospital for Functional Nervous Disorders in Camden Town.

James' youngest brother, Sidney (1874–1941) was a prisoner of war in World War I and was valuable to his fellow prisoners because of his extensive knowledge of German and his ability to act as an interpreter.

== Work ==
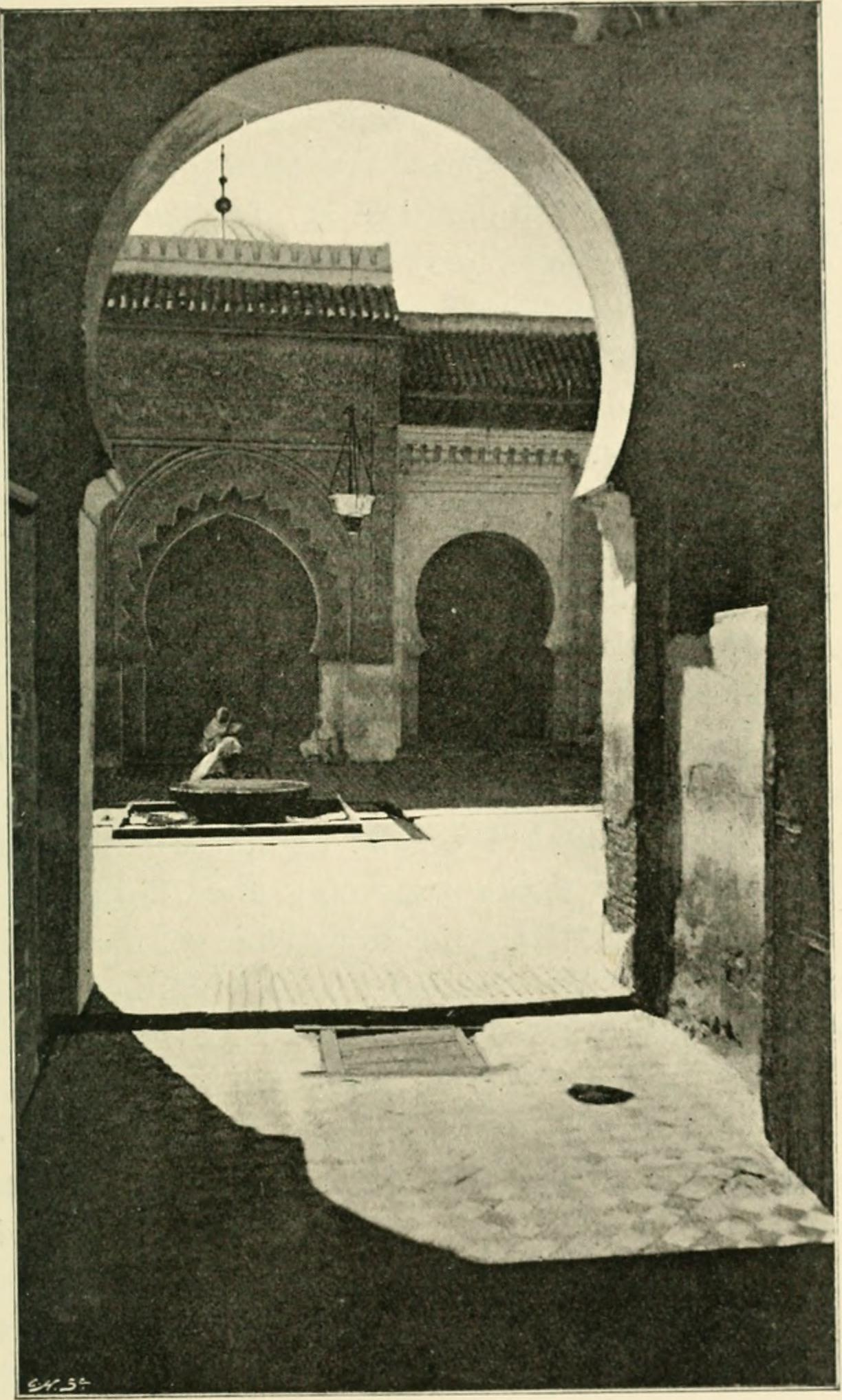
Photograph by R. J. Moss in The land of the Moors; a comprehensive description (1901)

- An Introduction to the Arabic of Morocco (1891) – An English-Arabic dictionary.
- The Moorish Empire; a Historical Epitome (1899).
- The Land of the Moors (1901).
- The Moors: A Comprehensive Description (1902).
- Life in Morocco and Glimpses Beyond (1905).
- Model Factories and Villages (1905).
