= H. H. & S. Budgett =

Defunct British grocer

H.H. & S. Budgett was a leading wholesale grocer covering South-West England, South Wales and the London area. It began about 1820 when Samuel Budgett (1794 – 1851) became in turn: apprentice, journeyman and partner to his half-brother Henry Hill Budgett (c 1779 – 1849) in the latter's small shop in Kingswood, Bristol. Samuel had a passion for trading. He introduced the practice of buying in bulk and delivering to other small shops like his own. This grew rapidly so that, at the time of his death in 1851, Samuel was giving away £2,000 per annum out of his share of the profits and the company had customers from Birmingham to Penzance. His descendants and non-family partners continued to manage the business well and it flourished for over a century.

Budgetts were taken over in 1961 by Scribbans-Kemp. They still continued, still with family members on the board but gradually declined as a business under the relentless pressure of the supermarkets. Although they changed to some extent: opening Cash & Carry Warehouses for retailers and buying retail shops themselves, they had failed to seize a strong position in the supermarket trade at an early stage and consequently were perhaps bound to fail in the long run. By 1977 Budgetts, together with Oakeshotts, had been sold for “almost £5m”. Initially, the purchaser was Warriner and Mason, a subsidiary of Gallagher. Later, Warriner and Mason were to sell the cash & carry business to Bookers and the wholesale delivered business to Danish Bacon Company.

== Beginning ==
Samuel Budgett and Henry Hill Budgett were both sons of James Budgett (1749–1823). Henry was the elder son of James's first marriage – to Ann Hill (1755–1787). After she died, James married Elizabeth (Betsy) Budgett (1767–1831) and Samuel was their first son. The family moved several times. In 1801 they took the shop in Kingswood. In 1803 parents and children moved again to Coleford, Somerset leaving Henry Hill Budgett in charge of the shop.

The young Samuel had two passions: to be a missionary and to be a trader. His family were poor. They could not afford a missionary's education and they were in need of an extra breadwinner so a trader it had to be. In April 1809 he signed indentures to be an apprentice to Henry but already he was a trader. He had made many trades with whatever he could find and before he left his mother and father (now in Coleford) to travel to Kingswood, he gave her his total profits – the considerable sum (in those days) of 30 pounds. In about 1816 the apprentice-ship expired and Samuel signed a three-year contract to work for Henry, at annual salaries of 40, 50 and 60 pounds. During this time he started to put his trading skills to use and gradually took over the buying and pricing duties. At the end of that contract, about 1819, Henry had got into difficulties with a banking venture. Samuel however, had saved 100 pounds from his wages and he handed them over. In return, he was made a partner. Samuel took a small cottage near the shop and married Ann Smith from Midsomer Norton.

== Partnership ==
Samuel now was eager to put his trading skills to further use. Customers used to travel some distance to the shop and he started calling on them to take orders. Gradually he extended this to limited wholesale trading. His more experienced brother was nervous about these innovations and although that held Samuel back, it may have enabled them to keep the business in balance between safety and growth.

After they had mastered this limited trading they extended it. Hitherto they had sold in small villages. Now they would try towns. Samuel had bought butter when the market was low so he tried to sell it in Frome. The big shops turned up their noses at a salesman from humble Kingswood so he hinted that the smaller shops (whom they supplied) might be interested. That was enough in some cases to make the sale. It became his normal practice to begin a fresh town with the large shops and sell what was left to the smaller ones. Also when making a later visit to a town, he would visit again those who had refused him before and present his day's offers calmly. He always took care to give his first and best attention to whoever had first accepted him in any town. He trained his travellers in the same principles. In time the business reached as far as Birmingham and Penzance. A warehouse was built in Kingswood and the place expanded with new houses for Budgett employees. Samuel bought the grounds of an old quarry. Here he built a substantial house where he lived to the end of his life.

Other Bristol merchants were jealous. They made a ‘run’ on the firm by submitting accounts early. Samuel resolved to pay them as presented. He obtained emergency funds from his friends. When the cheque for the last account was given, he mounted his horse and raced the payee to the bank, seeing him enter by another door. So he was able to pay in more cash just in time. After the crisis was over, he visited the merchants who had made the run. He found that they had all been ‘informed’ that Budgetts were in trouble by a former Budgett employee whom Budgetts had sacked. The brothers made this man apologise in public.

Samuel had a fixed policy from the beginning of not granting credit. If the customer was present, he had to pay in full, if he was distant, the traveller would call every four weeks precisely and must then be paid in full. Some shops refused these terms. Budgetts would not deal with those shops. Some failed to meet them. Budgetts would not trade with them until the account was cleared. Samuel saw families ruined as a result of overstretching their credit and felt that for one party to trifle with the rules was dangerous to them both. He also felt that if Budgetts set a good example, others would follow, to the benefit of all. On the other hand, if a customer was in difficulty and made a clean breast of it, he would do whatever he could to help. At that time, business on continental Europe was largely conducted on terms no longer than eight weeks and consequently much more sound than in Britain or the U.S.A. With our current experience of the Credit Crunch and its consequences, these points seem as relevant today as they were at the time.

== Big Changes in the 1840s ==
In about 1842, Henry retired, leaving Samuel in sole charge. The First Opium War had broken out in 1839 throwing the tea trade into disarray. Samuel went to London and made a killing. When the war ended in 1842, the price of tea collapsed and he lost as much as he had made previously. This taught him to avoid speculation.

=== Fire ===
Also in 1842 there was a major fire. Fire engines attended from insurers: Sun, Bristol Union, Norwich, West of England. According to the local paper, it was discovered at 7.15 am in the “titler room” (for refined sugar). Local people went to help and all the insurers sent fire engines but the warehouse and counting houses were destroyed. The nearby houses and the horses in their stables were saved and no one was hurt. The company's books were saved. The fire continued until 4 am the next day.

The company was well insured. Samuel immediately rode to the smaller warehouse at Nelson Street in central Bristol and engaged the next-door warehouse. All customers awaiting deliveries were informed that those deliveries would be sent out the next day. By a massive collective effort this was achieved.

This apparent setback made the company stronger. The new warehouse was in a more strategic position, especially as the railway system reached Bristol, and the internal layout was thought out again from the beginning.

At this time Budgetts introduced an annual Summer Fete. All employees and partners came to Samuel's residence, Park House, at 3pm. All mixed equally and a meal was served. Afterwards their wives and sweethearts arrived to stroll, play sports or listen to music. Then they all sat down to tea. Alcohol was banned so some people moved on to the pub afterwards.

=== Railways ===
Although no direct evidence is available, railway development must have been critical to the development of Budgetts as a regional business. Key railways would be:

- Great Western Railway reached Bristol 1841.
- Bristol and Exeter Railway opened 1844.
- Bristol and Gloucester Railway opened 1844.
- Birmingham and Gloucester Railway opened 1840 and linked to Bristol from 1844.
- Cheltenham and Great Western Union Railway opened Swindon (on the Great Western) to Cirencester 1841, opened throughout to Cheltenham 1847
- South Wales Railway joined Gloucester, Chepstow, Newport, Cardiff, Bridgend, Swansea, Carmarthen and Milford Haven, fully opened 1854.

These railways would have reduced transport costs and times from suppliers and to customers. Allowable distances would have been increased. A large new market was suddenly made available to Budgetts. Regional markets in many staple grocery products would have been replaced by national markets.

=== Samuel's Last Years ===
Meanwhile, back in Kingswod Samuel improved his residence. The property was an old quarry. He had this filled in and made into gardens and farmland, forty to fifty acres. As well as providing his family with more space, this provided employment for local people. Later an old man said, “Yes; I remember when there were five men and three horses, and I have lived to see three hundred men and one hundred horses.”

Samuel died in 1851, leaving a strong and vigorous business in the hands of an excellent workforce and a family willing and able to continue along the same lines as before. His three surviving sons James (1823-1906), William (1827-1900) and Samuel(1831-1904), were old enough to seize their opportunities and keep the business growing. They continued the daily morning prayers and annual staff mixers initiated by their father.

In 1872, Budgetts extended their premises to include the whole block bounded by Rupert St, Nelson St. and Bridewell.

== Samuel's sons separate ==
In July 1875, the firm was reorganised. James Budgett and his son Richard continued the London business under the name “James Budgett and Son” . William and Samuel (son of the founder) continued the tea trade in London and the whole business in Bristol under the original name “H.H. and S. Budgett”

Samuel Jr. was in difficulties. He was married to Sarah, one of two daughters of John Brogden. The other daughter was Mary, who was married to William Billing. John had died in December 1869. In his will, signed in 1867, he left his business interests to his sons: Alexander, Henry and James; who had been his partners and were now the executors. He had made a marriage settlement of £10,000 in 1867 with Mary Billing. He left a similar amount as a legacy. Both these were to be held in trust. The trustees were Samuel Budgett, Alexander Brogden and James Brogden. The terms of the trust was that it should be invested in “gilts or similar” within five years i.e. by December 1874. The sons were adventurous in running the business. By 1874 they were in difficulties. They had retained the trust funds in the business. Samuel was unable to persuade them to move the funds to a safer place. Perhaps for the sake of family relations he was reluctant to force the issue as the law and the trust's terms required. This left all the trustees in Breach of trust. If Brogdens should fail, all Samuel's fellow trustees would fail with it and Samuel would have to refund the trust himself. All the assets of James and William, his brothers, were potentially forfeit because they were also his partners and therefore liable for his debts.

In 1880, Brogdens duly failed and Mrs Billing sued the trustees (effectively just Samuel) for the missing money. The case was heard in Chancery in 1887 and in the Court of Appeal in 1886. Samuel argued that the money could not have been recovered in 1874 and also that an attempt to recover would have brought them down but the Billings disagreed and the judge found in their favour. Brogdens’ accounts at the end of 1874 and their turnover suggested to the judge that they could have found the money. The Appeal Court agreed. Both courts stated that the trustees’ duty to apply the terms of the trust is absolute. A trustee is not allowed to stay his hand in order to help a friend or relative. In this case Samuel should have demanded the money in December 1874 and, if necessary, begun legal action no later than March 1875. The judge said that it was the most difficult case he had ever tried.

It's not a long time between December 1874 and July 1875. It seems reasonable to suggest that: James had taken legal advice; he was aware of Samuel's legal position as stated much later by the judge; he was concerned about Samuel's failure to act promptly; he could foresee the failure of Brogdens and the court case; he knew that he and William would be jointly responsible for any damages and costs incurred in the case and he demanded the separation to minimise the risk to the prosperity of his family. If James was indeed concerned then 1 July 1875 was probably the earliest date at which they could dissolve the old partnership and create the new one without causing undesirable public comment and enquiries.

Since William remained in partnership with Samuel, he would still have been liable for Samuel's debts. This may have been the reason why Budgetts became a Limited Company (see below). It would have enabled the directors to replenish the reserves and also to expand the business, while still retaining control. By this time, not surprisingly, neither Samuel nor any of his sons was listed as a director.

On 1 January 1893 Samuel Arnold Budgett and Walter Felix Budgett, sons of Samuel Budgett Jr. trading in London and New York as S.A.Budgett and Co., had a receiving order granted against them. On examination, they stated that their father and uncle had transferred parts of their business to them when they commenced trading on 1 January 1891. Liabilities were £22,000 and assets £1,000. Failure was owing to bad debts owed by their father and trading losses. Their father had failed in July or August 1892 leading to the bad debt and to their own failure. Their partner J.W. Nightingale was believed to be still trading in New York, where the London court could not reach him.

Overall it seems fair to say that this three brother partnership would probably have continued but for Samuel's Brogden trusteeship. With hindsight he seems to have failed to foresee and manage the threats which his Brogden trusteeship might present to his Budgett partnership. In 1874 Brogdens were in difficulties and he may have been reluctant to become the straw that broke the camel's back. At the same time his legal advisors would surely have pointed out the pressing nature of his trusteeship responsibilities. He could perhaps have resolved this conflict by calling a meeting in 1874 or early 1875 between the Billings and the Brogdens. There he would have the aim to resolve the conflict either by getting Brogdens to make the trust's cash available to a neutral third party, who would be instructed to invest it as John Brogden's will directed, or by getting the Billings to agree with the Brogdens another form of words which was mutually agreeable, legally binding, and supervised by a third party, or by agreeing with the Billings to begin legal proceedings against his Brogden brothers-in-law. This would have extricated Samuel from his difficult and ultimately ruinous position.

By 1874, it seems that James had built a strong base in London. If the assets and energy of James and Samuel could have been retained in the firm then it seems likely that Budgetts' positions in both London and Bristol would have strengthened and the firm become national instead of just regional.

== Limited Company ==
On 21 July 1898, the company became a limited company. H. H. and S. Budgett (Limited), with a share capital of £150,000, divided into 15,000 5% Cumulative Preference shares and 15,000 Ordinary Shares of £5 each had been formed to take over the old firm - Messrs. H. H. and S. Budgett and Co. Wholesale grocers and drysalters of Nelson Street, Bristol - under the existing management. On public offer were 10,000 5% Cumulative Preference shares at £5 ranking in priority over the Ordinary Shares. The vendors would take 10,000 Ordinary Shares in part payment of the purchase money for the business.

The directors were: William Henry Budgett (WHB, son of the founder) and William Edward, James Herbert and Charles Theodore Budgett, all sons of WHB. The Prospectus said the firm had been in existence for over 100 years, currently with “some four thousand regular and continuous customers”. Assets were: Book Debts, guaranteed by the vendors: £54,645, Stock-in-trade £32,571, Premises, Plant, Fixtures, etc. £44,938, less trade liabilities £67,601, net surplus £64,555.

The Auditors: Ogden, Palmer and Langton, Austinfriars, London said they had audited seven years of accounts and the net average annual profits were sufficient to pay the interest on the issue of Preference Shares several times over. Business returns were practically uniform and, as the sales were spread over a great number of customers, the risk of loss by bad debts was exceptionally small relative to the large annual trade. The average profit for the previous three financial years had been higher than any previous similar average and the profit for 1896/7 was the highest of the seven years under review.

The seven years of accounts were presumably 1890/1 to 1896/7. In the last section we noted that Samuel Arnold and Walter Felix Budgett started trading on 1 January 1891. Presumably Samuel Jr.'s debts were transferred out of Budgetts in 1890 so that the auditors wouldn't have to report them.

The surveyors, J.P.Sturge & Sons, reported two buildings: “the commanding premises” at the corner of Nelson-street and Bridewell-street, leased from Bristol Corporation for 75 years from 1879 at £600 per year, and the adjoining premises, leased by two leases from the corporation for 40 years from 1898 for £10 16s and £16 4s respectively, renewable every 14 years in perpetuity. Part of this building was sublet to J. S. Fry & Sons and part to Lever & Co.

In 1900, WHB died, leaving the business to the sons mentioned above. Another son, John Samuel Budgett, chose instead to be a zoologist.

== Later Developments ==
In 1913, there was a fire at the Bristol premises beginning at 7 am on a Saturday. It took six hours to bring it under control. No one was injured. The books and the horses were rescued as before. The loss of £20,000 was fully covered by insurance. The business was carried on in the old portion of the building which was undamaged.

In 1920 154,500 Preference Shares were offered to the public to add to the 94,500 already in circulation and another 100,000 authorised but not issued. The interest rate had, by this time, been raised to 7 ½ %. 100,000 Ordinary Shares at £1 each already authorised of which 50,000 were issued to and held by directors and paid up, the remainder unissued. The directors (all Budgetts) were William Edward, James Herbert and Charles Theodore Budgett Annual profits to March were stated from 1912 to 1919. They showed a fairly steady rise from £15,000 in 1912 to £34,000 in 1919 The area of distribution was: The Midlands, South Wales and South-West England, with depots at Bristol (Head Office, one whole side of Bridewell Street), Birmingham (Carr's Lane and Great Colmore Street), Cardiff (New Street, next to the railway) and Swansea (York Street, built in 1916). Sales also showed a steady rise, with 1919 being a record. Brands included “Crescent Brand” and “Red Ring” flour. The offer was subscribed twice over.

At the 1920 AGM, the chairman (W.E.Budgett) said they had been acquiring other companies that fitted well and they now covered the country from Newcastle-upon-Tyne to Lands End. Turnover had multiplied many times but much of the benefit had been taken by the Government in Excess Profits Tax. He was hopeful that this would end fairly soon. This year they had acquired Twigge and Butters of Liverpool. The acquired companies were being run by their previous directors and there was a good corporate spirit.

In December 1932, the company offered 100,000 of 200,000 6% Preference Shares at £1 each in United Counties Stores. This was a company recently set up by Budgetts to run old-established retail groceries (currently 57 of them) located in the Midlands, Wales and South-West England. Budgetts held the 200,000 Ordinary Shares at £1 each. This arrangement continued for many years.

In World War II, Bristol was much bombed, especially near the docks. On 24 November 1940, part of Budgetts' premises were bombed. The staff worked hard to get the business working but then more bombs fell in early December leaving little of the buildings. The business was essential however so the work was moved to other premises. General goods, tea, chocolate, and flour each went to a different place. Groceries were retained at Nelson St.

In 1948 delivery depots were set up at Exeter, Cheltenham and East Coker. In the mid-50s, Cash and Carry warehouses were set up around the country.

In 1951, 90,000 Ordinary Shares were offered at 22 s. (£1.10) to Preference Shareholders and 10,000 to existing Ordinary Shareholders. The Preference Shareholders took up 57,000 of the Ordinary Shares offered to them and the Ordinary Shareholders took up all of theirs. This appears to be the first time that Ordinary Shares were offered to the general public.

The dividend on Ordinary Shares for the year to 28 Feb 1956 was 10%. This was held in 1957 and 1958.

== Decline ==
In 1961 the business was acquired by Scribbans-Kemp. Their chairman said it was an old-established firm with a very substantial wholesale trade in food commodities, notably sugar and a chain of over 100 retail grocery shops.

Reports in later years show Scribbans reporting challenging conditions and acquiring more and more other firms. In June 1967, Chairman William McPhail said he hoped conditions would improve. In January 1968, Chairman William McPhail and managing Director Dr. William A. Bullen were stated in a single announcement to be both leaving, having joined in 1964 and 1966 respectively. Then in August another grocery firm, Oakeshotts, were purchased for £1.5 million

At the AGM for the year ended 29th Mar 1969 Scribbans reported having sold their bakery business to J. S. Lyons and to be acquiring more shops. The wholesale part of the business was converting to "Cash and Carry" stores. These were losing money – this would have to be controlled. The overdraft was up to £60 million and this would have to be funded. Lyons also reported buying the bakery business at their AGM.

The name was changed from Scribbans-Kemp to Barker and Dobson between 1971 and 1973 and the share price moved downwards. In 1973, Budgetts and Oakeshotts had a new Managing Director. In September 1974 some of the Cash and Carry stores were sold.

Barker and Dobson had problems in 1975 and 1976. The Times said: "Trading losses and write offs reported", 18 Jul 1975, "deeper in red" 31 Dec 1975, "Oakeshotts to dispose of 67 shops", 29 May 1976, "Loan deeds breached", 26 Jun 1976, "Lossmaker Barker & Dobson qualified", 3 Aug 1976.

By 1977 Budgetts had been sold for "almost £5m" but it is not clear to whom. Budgetts began as a small shop in 1820, lost its autonomy 140 years later in 1961 and probably disappeared completely in 1977 after 157 years, a long record by any standard.
