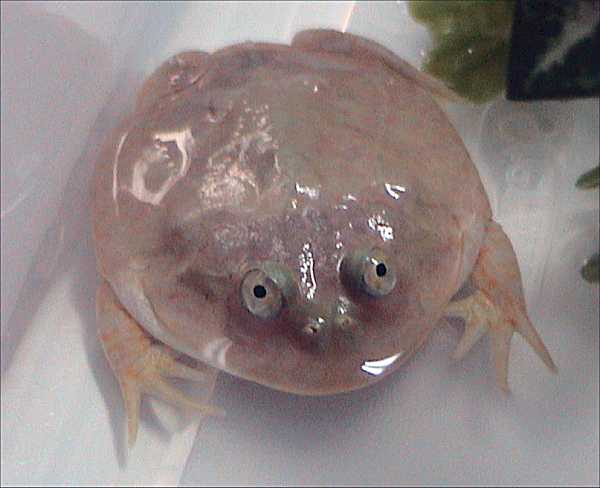
- Lepidobatrachus laevis

Scientific classification
- Kingdom: Animalia
- Phylum: Chordata
- Class: Amphibia
- Order: Anura
- Family: Ceratophryidae
- Genus: Lepidobatrachus; Budgett, 1899

Species
- Lepidobatrachus asper (Budgett, 1899); Lepidobatrachus laevis (Budgett, 1899); Lepidobatrachus llanensis (Reig & Cei, 1963) †Lepidobatrachus dibumartinez (Turazzini & Gómez, 2023)

= Lepidobatrachus =

Lepidobatrachus Temporal range: Late Miocene–Recent

Genus of amphibians

Lepidobatrachus is a genus of ceratophryidid frogs. They are commonly known as Paraguay horned frogs or Budgett's frogs (in honor of John Samuel Budgett, who described the genus), although the latter technically describes a specific species, Lepidobatrachus laevis.

== Geographic range ==
Lepidobatrachus are found in South America, in Paraguay, Argentina, Brazil, and Bolivia.

== Description ==
Lepidobatrachus frogs are generally a light, olive green in color, sometimes with lighter green or yellow mottling. They have a rounded, flattened body with eyes set high on their head. They have short limbs, which make them inefficient swimmers. They do not have teeth, but they do have two sharp protrusions, common to all Ceratophryidae, inside their mouth, which serve the same purpose.

== Tadpole Activity ==
Lepidobatrachus frogs are incredibly adaptive animals whose reproductive patterns are very specific to environmental conditions. They are fast, and the reproductive season starts during the rainy season since they lay their eggs in ephemeral pools, which are seasonal pools of water that help aid in forming small ecosystems. After the eggs are laid, the tadpoles then go into a speedy development because those pools are short-lived. They develop much faster. also, compared to other frog species, tadpoles resort to cannibalism and eat many of their siblings because of the competition for resources.

== In captivity ==
Budgett's frogs are very rarely found in a traditional chain pet shop. The most commonly available species is L. laevis. Due to their comical appearance, they tend to make an attractive option for the intermediate to advanced amphibian keeper. They have an average lifespan of about 10 years.
