= John Samuel Budgett =

British zoologist and embryologist (1872–1904)

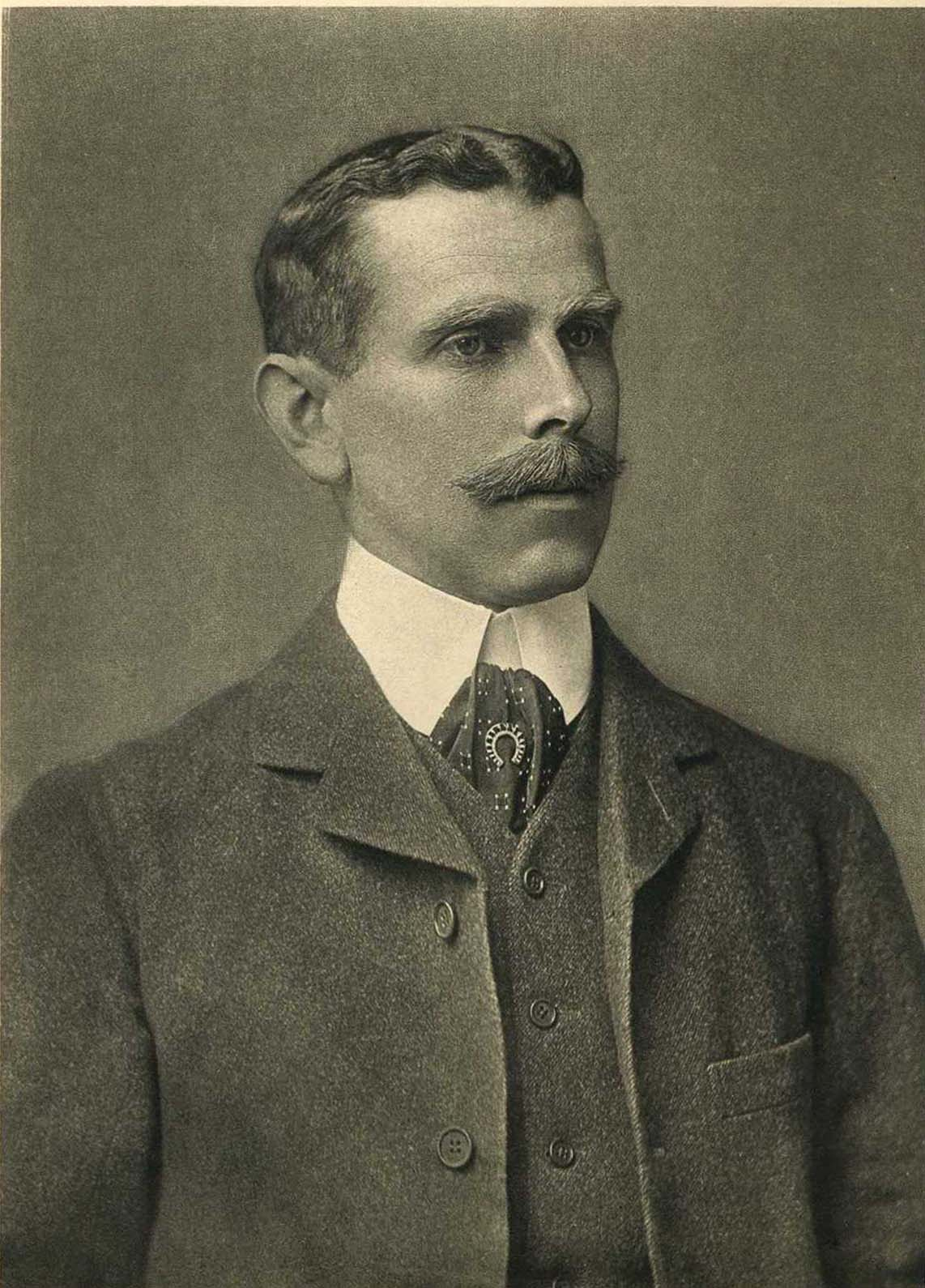
- John Samuel Budgett
- Born: 16 June 1872
- Died: 19 January 1904 (aged 31)
- Education: Trinity College, Cambridge
- Scientific career
- Fields: Zoology; Embryology
- Workplaces: Cambridge University
- Academic advisors: William Kitchen Parker Arthur Shipley John Graham Kerr

John Samuel Budgett (16 June 1872 – 19 January 1904) was a British zoologist and embryologist. He spent most of his short career on the genus Polypterus (bichir). This is found in the lakes, river margins, swamps, and floodplains of tropical central and western Africa and the Nile River system. Zoologists at the time wondered whether it was a bony fish, a cartilaginous fish, a lungfish or a primitive amphibian. Forty years after the publication of Darwin's Origin of Species, zoologists were seeking to map the history of species and this primitive animal was a key part of the map. To find its place there, it was necessary to observe juvenile Polypterus in the wild. It took Budgett four African expeditions but in the end he succeeded in doing so.

However, the long periods spent in swampy, mosquito-ridden places left him debilitated with malaria and he died of blackwater fever shortly after his return to England. This happened on the very day that he was supposed to deliver a lecture on his work to the Zoological Society of London. He did not even have time to write a report. However he did leave a full set of drawings and specimens. It was left to his friend and colleague John Graham Kerr to interpret them and write the report.

Budgett's work remained the basis of understanding Polypterus development for almost 100 years.

In an earlier expedition with Kerr to the Gran Chaco in central South America, Budgett did useful work on the amphibians of that area and discovered two species of a new genus Lepidobatrachus asper and Lepidobatrachus laevis. The genus was named Budgett's Frog in his honour.

== Early life ==
John Samuel Budgett was born at Redlands House, Bristol on 16 June 1872. His parents were William Henry Budgett (1827–1900) and Ann (née Lidgett, 1839–1936). When John was two they moved to Stoke House and Park, Stoke Bishop, Bristol.

William was a keen microscopist and served on the council of Bristol Museum. He was a keen amateur student of zoology and encouraged his children to study it. Professionally he was a partner in H.H. & S. Budgett, a successful wholesale grocery firm. Often he had professional scientists to stay during the summer and John was able to get informal tuition from them. Prominent among these was Professor William Kitchen Parker. For twenty-three consecutive years Parker spent a fortnight at Stoke Park. He was noted for his skill in preserving delicate skeletons, such as tadpoles and small birds, and he appears to have passed some of this skill to John.

Parker had studied the development of the skull and John began working on the topic himself, using his skills in dissection and specimen preparation. He designed a device for aligning serial sections that enabled him to construct models of the developing skull. He became an expert in this.

John was fascinated by the animal world, building aviaries and adapting outbuildings for a museum and a laboratory. The museum contained minute dissections, skeletons (including a cow and a deer) and stuffed animals all prepared by him and presented against natural-looking backgrounds. He visited Bristol Zoo often to obtain dead animals. He was skilled in keeping animals healthy, a good draftsman and watercolourist. In the summer he used to get up at 3 a.m. and walk miles to study animals and birds at dawn.

Budgett was educated first at a kindergarten, then Clifton College. However, he had to leave the College at about fourteen owing to severe headaches caused by an accident. He continued his studies with private tutors before entering University College, Bristol. There he received help in the formal study of zoology but much of his practical skill was self-taught.

== Cambridge ==
John went up to Trinity College, Cambridge in 1894. With his knowledge of natural history and strong testimonials, Budgett was elected to the Cambridge University Natural Sciences Club in his first year, a rare honour, for this club was limited to 12 undergraduates and a few graduate members. He was also elected a member of the Pitt Club at Cambridge.

In August 1896, in his third and final year as an undergraduate, Budgett accompanied a newly graduated Kerr on an expedition to the Gran Chaco of South America.

In 1890 Kerr had travelled on an expedition mounted by the Argentinean Navy to survey the Pilcomayo River from the Paraná River north to the Bolivian border. He had conducted original research on Nautilus as an undergraduate and found that it provided a link between cephalopods and the rest of the molluscs. He had concluded that there was a general case to be made for studying the archaic species in a group to shed light on the group's evolution. It had been known since 1836 that the lungfish Lepidosiren lived in the Amazon so when Kerr learned in 1890 that a soldier had caught an eel-like fish he wondered whether it might be a lungfish.

During his subsequent study at Cambridge, Kerr had developed an ambition to make a study of Lepidosiren and this was the prime goal of the new expedition.

Budgett's principal study on the expedition was Anurous Amphibians or Batrachians. He collected many samples and made drawings and notes. He discovered a genus new to science: Lepidobatrachus with two species, Lepidobatrachus asper and Lepidobatrachus laevis and subsequently published a paper. Lepidobatrachus was later given the common name Budgett's Frog. A third species has since been discovered.

Conditions were difficult. At times the Pilcomayo is 300 m wide, at times it is a trickle or stagnant swamp, marsh, lagoons, and dense tropical jungle. It has sand banks, confusing channels, and barriers of overturned and floating debris. Nevertheless, by the summer of 1897 Kerr and Budgett brought back to Cambridge a large supply of adult lungfish, with major embryonic and larval phases, so well preserved that the finest detail could be seen. Budgett's skill in manipulation and his knowledge of reagents played an important part in this success.

Arthur Shipley says, "It was a remarkable feat. To go straight as an arrow to the place where this almost unknown fish lives, to arrive at about the time of the breeding season, quite unknown before, and to collect and preserve all the delicate and varying stages of development within some seven months, placed the expedition at the first rank of Zoological exploration. But there is another factor which makes it even more remarkable, and that is the wonderful condition of the material when it arrived.... The difficulty in improvised rooms, worried by all sorts of insects, by torrential rains and occasionally floods, by inquisitive and highly suspicious natives...must have been enormous, but it was overcome. The success in this respect was certainly partly due to his [Budgett's] skill in manipulation and his peculiar knowledge of the use of reagents.".

== Graduation ==
On his return to Cambridge, Budgett had to catch up on his reading for Part II of the Natural Sciences Tripos (the Cambridge equivalent of Finals). He was not good at examinations but managed to get a Second. He then set to work on his South American frogs and completed his paper on them. He was a gifted draughtsman and watercolourist. The figures in his papers were both artistic and accurate.

Kerr had designed an apparatus to reconstruct solid figures from a series of microscopic drawings which have been obtained from sections or slices of the original biological structure. This might for example be the whole or part of an organ of an animal. The principle is that each section is drawn on to a piece of ground glass whose thickness bears a definite relation to the thickness of the section. Then the glass plates are placed in a bath of oil which eliminates the opacity of the ground glass and should provide a 3D image of the original structure. Budgett applied his ingenuity to make it easier to get the glasses in exactly the right position and his knowledge of reagents to choose an oil that allowed the maximum possible amount of light to pass.

== Polypterus ==
Budgett's ambition was to attack one of the great unsolved problems of zoology. Having watched Kerr work on lungfish in South America he resolved to work on two genera, in Africa which were then called Polypterus and Calamichthys. Calamichthys is now more usually called Erpetoichthys. These are the sole survivors of a vast group which flourished in the Palaeozoic and Mesozoic Periods. At that time little was known about them.

In 1861 Thomas Henry Huxley had created an order: Crossopterygii to house those extinct and extant animals that possessed lungs and fleshy pectoral fins with lepidotrichia. He had established a separate group (the tribe Polypterinus) within the order Crossopterygii for Polypterus and Calamichthys. He only had access to preserved specimens so his suggestion that Polypterus and Calamichthys belonged to Crossopterygii was only a theory. Work in the field was needed to test it. Francis Balfour and his Cambridge students had shown in the 1870s and early 1880s that embryology could help to answer questions about evolution. Perhaps the embryology of Polypterus, lungfish and related groups could help to establish which group of fishes had given rise to amphibians and hence to all tetrapods.

In 1895, Bashford Dean, a leading authority, wrote: "From their isolated position, these recent forms [Polypterus and Calamoichthys] become of extreme interest to the morphologist, and from the side of their development, when this comes to be studied, they are expected to throw the greatest light on the relations of the primitive Teleostome to the sharks and Dipnoans, on the one hand, and to the Ganoids on the other".

At the time nothing was known about juvenile Polypterus. This was partly because its habitat was remote and inhospitable and partly because of recurring warfare until the late 1890s. Budgett worked to fill this gap for five years and eventually succeeded, but only at the cost of his life.

== First Expedition: The Gambia ==
Budgett thought first of the Nile but a friend suggested the Gambia. He sailed on 19 October 1898, arriving on 3 November. His stay lasted eight months. He kept a diary and recorded many observations. While searching for the breeding place of Polypterus he observed and collected other fish. He found Polypterus containing ova but not developing ova. He tried artificial fertilisation and he tried holding fish in cages to breed but these methods failed. He was constantly battling against the heat and against illness. Towards the end of July he was confined to bed and on 28 July he started his return journey. Although he had failed in his main goal he had gained experience; he had established the breeding period of Polypterus and he had collected information about the fauna of the Gambia. Three papers were published.

== Nathan Harrington ==
Quite independently, Nathan Harrington (1870–1899), an experienced field biologist and a doctoral student at Columbia University had already set out to find Polypterus embryos. Harrington and Reid Hunt, a tutor in physiology at Columbia, reached Cairo on 26 May 1898 in the midst of the Anglo-Egyptian campaign against the Mahdi. Their search lasted until 10 September and took them 377 miles up the Nile but they failed to find adults with mature eggs. The two men returned to the United States in December with preserved specimens of adult Polypterus, fishes and other vertebrates, and a large collection of invertebrates. In late December, Harrington presented a paper on the respiration and breeding habits of Polypterus to the American Morphological Society. Harrington thought that Polypterus occupied an intermediate position between fishes and amphibians and so could shed light on the origins of tetrapods.

In 1899 Harrington got permission to travel with Hunt and F. B. Sumner (also from Columbia University) to a small village and military post on the northernmost tributary of the Nile, the Atbara River, about 650 km south of Khartoum. Sadly in July, after spending only one night in the desert, Harrington came down with what was described as Nile fever. It rapidly worsened and took his life within days.

== Second Boer War ==
When Budgett returned to England in the Autumn of 1899, he found the country in a turmoil on the eve of the Second Boer War. He had always been patriotic and his travels had made him more so. He felt he should go to the front but he was liable to recurring attacks of malaria acquired in the American and African swamps. Instead he joined the Mounted Infantry section of the Cambridge University Volunteers, giving all his spare time to the training of men for the War.

== Second Expedition: The Gambia ==
Budgett returned to the Gambia in the rainy season of 1900, arriving at McCarthy Island on 6 June. The country was uncharacteristically dry and politically in a disturbed state. On 19 June, news came that the Commissioners (Sitwell and Silva) had been ambushed at a conference and murdered, together with their policemen.

Budgett traced the development of Gymnarchus niloticus and made observations on other fish, frogs, mosquitoes and other insects. He returned in August. He had caught 127 Polypterus senegalus and 36 Polypterus lapradei but failed to obtain the fertilised ova he wanted.

== Assistant Curator and Third Expedition ==
In May 1901 Budgett was appointed Assistant Curator of the University Zoological Museum. He made a number of beautiful preparations to demonstrate anatomy to students. He published four papers based on his expeditions.

In 1902 Budgett met the Rev. John Roscoe who was then resident in Uganda and spending the winter in Cambridge. Roscoe was well informed about the local people and about the natural history. He convinced Budgett that the best place to look for developing Polypterus ova was Albert Nyanza and the neighbouring streams.

In March Budgett was elected to the Balfour Studentship . Named after Francis Maitland Balfour, this was the top studentship at Cambridge for a research student in Zoology. With its income, together with various grants, the trip became possible and Budgett set out in May, reaching Mombasa in June. A second object was added: to capture a live okapi but in the end this was given up.

Budgett travelled to Entebbe with the Commissioner of British East Africa. There it took about nine days to arrange a Safari. It set out on 11 July, according to Budgett's diary, "with forty porters, four askaris, two headmen and four boys." Budgett himself used a cycle where possible to give himself additional time to make observations. They reached the lake on 30 July and almost immediately found specimens of Polypterus senegalus. The females had mostly shed their eggs so he decided to proceed north where the season was later. On 22 August he stopped for several days at Fajao, near the Murchison Falls. He caught many Polypterus females (locally called "Intontos") laying or having laid eggs. He was certain that the fry must swarm in the floating vegetation (sud). However he failed to catch Polypterus fry although he did catch fry of many other species.

On 29 August he gave up and proceeded further north by boat, passing Wadelai, Nimule, Kiri, Legu and reaching Gondokoro on 22 September. There he paid off the safari and spent a few days fishing unsuccessfully for Polypterus. Then he took a steamer to Fashoda arriving on 5 October. Then he went on to Khartoum, reaching it on 10 October. There he found a fisherman who had been fishing for Mr Loate of the British Museum. He engaged him and travelled back to Fashoda, arriving on 24 October. Polypterus were caught but they had already shed their eggs. He returned to Khartoum on 10 November, where he met Lord Kitchener. He was home by the end of the month.

== Search for a Permanent Post and Final Expedition ==
Budgett needed to find a position and applied for the post of Secretary to the London Zoological Society. The committee was impressed by his experience of keeping live animals in captivity but chose an older man. He did hope to apply for the job of Resident Superintendent so he and Shipley took a continental tour at Easter, 1903 visiting zoos at Paris, Frankfurt, Leipzig, Berlin, Hanover, Amsterdam and Antwerp. Shipley was impressed by his friend's knowledge and experience.

He continued to work on his fishes in Cambridge but yearned to make another attempt on Polypterus despite the health and safety risks. Dr Ansorge had brought back Polypterus larvae from the Niger delta and Budgett thought that if he went there he might finally be able to observe the development of these larvae.

He decided to trade on the fact that his Balfour Studentship was named after the brother of the Prime Minister, Arthur Balfour. He wrote to him asking if a Royal Navy ship could take him to Sierra Leone. The answer was negative but Balfour very generously paid for Budgett's passage out of his own pocket.

He left Liverpool on 27 June 1903 and reached Sierra Leone on 7 July. On 14 July they reached the mouth of the Forcados River, the most westerly of the many streams into which the Niger flows. He started first for Burutu where he caught stern-wheeler for Lokoja. He stopped at Assé where he was told that Polypterus were large but impossible to catch. So he carried on to Lokoja. There he inspected the possible fishing places but was not impressed so he continued towards Dakmon. He stopped at Muriji on 27 July. There he did some fishing, catching many species but few Polypterus. On 5 August he moved on to Dakmon, arriving two days later. This too was unpromising, so he set back to Assé, arriving on 12 August.

It was very wet but he worked hard, fishing and also collecting and interviewing local fishermen. His guide knew about P. senegalus. At last he began to get specimens with ova. He started artificial insemination and was able to watch the key formative stages, lasting about five days. On 9 September he wrote to a friend that he had fertilised about a thousand eggs and watched them develop in the way that he had expected. Sadly after a week, a fungus had attacked and they had all died before reaching full maturity. However he continued his work right through September and finally managed to preserve specimens of each stage of development including a few larvae.

== Last Days ==
On his return to England, Budgett was suffering bouts of malaria and his hands had sores from constantly handling formalin. However he returned to Cambridge and began to work out his material. The post of Resident Superintendent at London Zoo was a job which he had hoped for and it fell vacant but someone else got it. Over the Christmas holidays he spent time with Shipley in Cambridge and with his mother in Clifton, returning to Cambridge early in January. By 9 January he had finished his drawings of the external features of the developing Polypterus ova. That evening he had an attack of blackwater fever. He held his own for a while. The blackwater fever receded but then he had an attack of malaria as well. He died on 19 January. This was the very day on which he had expected to report his work to the Zoological Society.

== Legacy ==
George Boulenger of the British Museum reviewed his work and wrote,"The breeding habits of fishes living between the Tropics are among the secrets of Nature which are most difficult to unravel, and which have most taxed the acumen and patience of zoologists...Several attempts have been made with the object of procuring the development stages of the African fishes Polypterus and Protopterus but in vain...Budgett succeeded but for this success he paid with his life....from each of these rivers he brought home not only most valuable notes on the habits of the fishes he came across, habits which were then totally unknown...embryological material....[and] very important collections of the fishes themselves, which it has been my privilege to name and describe." He lists new species as follows:

FISH

Marcusenius budgetti

Gnathonemus gilli

Clarias budgetti

Synodontis ocellifer

Rana budgetti

Shipley says that Budgett did experiments with reagents, materials and equipment which advanced zoological technique in the laboratory. He also says we owe to Budgett the first accurate knowledge of the urinogenital system of Polypterus and the demonstration that the crossopterygian fin is really a uniserial archipterygium as well as observations of the life-history and breeding habits of many tropical frogs and fishes.

As a memorial, Budgett's friend Graham Kerr edited a book. This contains all his papers as well as a biographical sketch by A. E. Shipley and assessments of his work by several authors

== Later Work on Polypterus ==
In a report to the 1907 annual meeting of the British Association for the Advancement of Science, Edwin Stephen Goodrich amassed all the evidence that Polypterus is not a crossopterygian, placing it within the palaeoniscids, the most primitive of the ray-finned (actinopterygian) fishes. This removed Polypterus from the ancestral line leading to amphibians.

Romer (1946) asserted, "[Polypterus] has no affinity with crossopterygians... Polypterus is a good actinopterygian and a primitive one". He also said, "The weight of Huxley's (1861) opinion is a heavy one and even today many a text continues to cite Polypterus as a crossopterygian and it is so described in many a classroom, although students of fish evolution have realised the falsity of this position for many years... Polypterus... is not a crossopterygian, but an actinopterygian and hence can tell us nothing about crossopterygian anatomy and embryology."

Phylogenetic analysis using both morphological and molecular data affirm that Polypterus is a living stem actinoptererygian.

A 1997 study confirmed the early embryonic stages drawn by Budgett and described by Kerr, although fertilisation was shown to be external. Development was found to be much more rapid than for lungfish. They found close similarities between the ontogenies of Polypterus and of urodele amphibians and other 'primitive' amphibians. Other questions that Budgett was hoping to answer are still unanswered.

== Publications by Budgett ==
All these papers were republished in Kerr, J.G., ed. (1907b).

Budgett J. S. (1899a) Notes on the Batrachians of the Paraguayan Chaco, with observations upon their breeding habits and development, especially with regard to Phyllomedusa hypochondrialis, Cope. Also a description of a new genus. Quarterly Journal of Microscopical Sciences 2 : 305–333.

Budgett J. S. (1899b) General account of an expedition to the Gambia Colony and Protectorate in 1898–99. Proceedings of the Zoological Society of London 1899: 931–937.

Budgett J. S. (1900) Observations on Polypterus and Protopterus. Proceedings of the Cambridge Philosophical Society 10s: 236–240.

Budgett J. S. (1901a) On some points in the anatomy of Polypterus. Transactions of the Zoological Society of London 15: 323–338.

Budgett J. S. (1901b) On the breeding habits of some West-African fishes, with an account of the external features in the development of Protopterus annectens, and a description of the larva of Polypterus lapradei. Transactions of the Zoological Society of London 16: 115–134.

Budgett J. S. (1902) On the structure of the larval Polypterus. Transactions of the Zoological Society of London 16: 315–338.

Budgett J. S. (1903a) Account of journey to Uganda. Proceedings of the Zoological Society of London: 2–10.

Budgett J. S. (1903b) Note on the spiracles of Polypterus. Proceedings of the Zoological Society of London (1903): 25–26.

== Other publications ==
Bartsch P., Gemballa S., Piotrowski T. (1997) The embryonic and larval development of Polypterus senegalus (Cuvier 1829): Its staging with reference to external and skeletal features, behaviour and locomotory habits. Acta Zoologica 78: 309–328, cited by Hall.

Budgett, J H. (1907). Note on habits of Polypterus. Pages 291–292 in Kerr J G, ed.

Dean, B. 1895. Fishes, Living and Fossil. An Outline of their Forms and Probable Relationships p. 149. Delhi (India): Narendra Publishing House., cited by Hall

Goodrich, E. S. (1908). On the systematic position of Polypterus. Report of the 77th Meeting of the British Association for the Advancement of Science (1907): 545–546, cited by Hall

Hall, B. K. (2001) John Samuel Budgett (1872–1904): In Pursuit of Polypterus, BioScience, Vol. 51, No. 5 (May 2001), pp. 399–407

Kerr, J.G. (1907a).The development of Polypterus senegalus Cuv. Pages 195–290 in Kerr, J.G., ed. 1907b

Kerr, J.G., ed. (1907b). The Work of John Samuel Budgett, Balfour Student of the University of Cambridge: Being a Collection of His Zoological Papers, together with a Biographical Sketch by A . E. Shipley, F.R.S., and Contributions by Richard Assheton, Edward J.Bles, Edward T. Browne, J. Herbert Budgett and J. Graham Kerr. Cambridge (UK): Cambridge University Press.

Kerr, J.G. (1950). A Naturalist in the Gran Chaco. Cambridge (UK): Cambridge University Press, cited by Hall.

Noack K, Zardoya R, Meyer A. (1996). The complete mitochondrial DNA sequence of the bichir (Polypterusor natipinnis), a basal ray-finned fish: Ancient establishment of the consensus vertebrate gene order. Genetics 144:1165–1180, cited by Hall

Patterson C. (1982). Morphology and interrelationships of primitive actinopterygian fishes. American Zoologist 22: 241–260, cited by Hall.

Romer, A S. (1946).The early evolution of fishes. Quarterly Review of Biology 21: 33–69, cited by Hall.

Shipley, A. E. (1907). Biographical sketch. Pages 1–55 in Kerr J. G, ed.
