= List of places in Bridgend County Borough =

Map of places in Bridgend County Borough compiled from this list
See the list of places in Wales for places in other principal areas.

This is a list of places in the Bridgend County Borough, south Wales.

== Administrative divisions ==
=== Electoral wards ===
This is a list of electoral wards in Bridgend County Borough, from 1999 to 2022:

- Aberkenfig
- Bettws
- Blackmill
- Blaengarw
- Brackla
- Bryncethin
- Bryncoch
- Bryntirion, Laleston and Merthyr Mawr
- Caerau
- Cefn Cribwr
- Cefn Glas
- Coity
- Cornelly
- Coychurch Lower
- Felindre
- Hendre
- Litchard
- Llangeinor
- Llangewydd & Brynhyfryd
- Llangynwyd
- Maesteg East
- Maesteg West
- Morfa
- Nant-y-Moel
- Newcastle
- Newton
- Nottage
- Ogmore Vale
- Oldcastle
- Pendre
- Penprysg
- Pen-y-fai
- Pontycymer
- Porthcawl East Central
- Porthcawl West Central
- Pyle
- Rest Bay
- Sarn
- Tondu
- Ynysawdre

=== Communities ===
This is a list of communities:

- Brackla
- Bridgend
- Cefn Cribwr
- Coity Higher
- Cornelly
- Coychurch Higher
- Coychurch Lower
- Garw Valley
- Laleston
- Llangynwyd Lower
- Llangynwyd Middle
- Maesteg
- Merthyr Mawr
- Newcastle Higher
- Ogmore Valley
- Pencoed
- Porthcawl
- Pyle
- St Bride's Minor
- Ynysawdre

== Notable places ==
Bridgend County Borough (shaded brown), South Wales.

=== Principal towns and villages ===
Settlements with a Town Council:

- Bridgend
- Maesteg
- Pencoed
- Porthcawl

Other sizable settlements:

- Brackla
- Kenfig
- Pyle
- Cornelly

=== Archaeological sites ===
- Coity Castle
- Newcastle
- Ogmore Castle
- Kenfig Castle

== Geographical ==
=== Beaches ===
- Coney Beach
- Kenfig Sands
- Rest Bay
- Sandy Bay, Porthcawl
- Trecco Bay

=== Rivers and waterways ===
- River Ewenny
- River Kenfig
- Ogmore
- Llynfi
- Garw River

== Retail parks ==
- McArthur Glen Designer Outlet Wales, Sarn, Bridgend
- Bridgend Retail Park
- Waterton Retail Park

== Transport ==
=== Major roads ===
- A48 road
- M4 motorway

=== Railway lines ===
- Maesteg Line
- South Wales Main Line
- Vale of Glamorgan Line

=== Railway stations ===
- Bridgend railway station
- Garth (Bridgend) railway station
- Pencoed railway station
- Pyle railway station
- Maesteg railway station
- Maesteg (Ewenny Road) railway station
- Sarn railway station
- Tondu railway station
- Wildmill railway station
