= 2004 Bridgend County Borough Council election =

2004 Welsh local government election

Results of the 2004 Bridgend County Borough Council election

The 2004 Bridgend County Borough Council election was held on Thursday 10 June 2004 to Bridgend County Borough Council, Wales. It took place on the same day as other council elections in Wales and England. It was preceded by the 1999 election and followed by the 2008 election.

The election resulted in the Labour Party losing control of the council.

== Overview ==
54 council seats were up for election, across 39 electoral wards, a similar number to the previous election in 1999.

Labour had a strong majority on the council prior to the election, though council leader Jeff Jones had recently stood down from his position.

== Election result ==
Labour lost 18 seats at the election, though remained the largest party. The following week, Liberal Democrat Cheryl Green announced she would lead a coalition of Lib Dems, Conservatives and Independents.

2004 Bridgend County Borough Council election result
Party	Seats	Gains	Losses	Net gain/loss	Seats %	Votes %	Votes	+/−
Labour	21			-17	38.8	35.5	13,112	
Liberal Democrats	13			+6	24.0	22.0	8,128	
Independent	11			+5	20.3	20.8	7,677	
Conservative	8			+7	14.8	14.0	5,173	
Plaid Cymru	1			0	1.8	6.3	2,343	
Green	-			0	0.0		272	+272
CPA	-			0	0.0		266	+266
Independent Labour	-			-1	0.0		0	-1,075

== Ward results ==
Contests took place in 37 of the 39 wards, with councillors in two of the wards being elected unopposed.

=== Aberkenfig (one seat) ===
Aberkenfig 2004
Party	Candidate	Votes	%	±%
Independent	Mel Winter *	408	63.7	
Labour	Byron Jones	233	36.3	

=== Bettws (one seat) ===
Bettws 2004
Party	Candidate	Votes	%	±%
Labour	Christopher Michaelides *	325	70.7	
Independent	Sophie Floutier	79	17.2	
Liberal Democrats	Arwyn Morgan	56	12.2	

=== Blackmill (one seat) ===
Blackmill 2004
Party	Candidate	Votes	%	±%
Labour	Hywel Williams	Unopposed		

=== Blaengarw (one seat) ===
Blaengarw 2004
Party	Candidate	Votes	%	±%
Independent	Carl Rees	275	47.1	
Labour	Violet Sherlock *	175	30.0	
Independent	Raymond Smiles	134	22.9	

=== Brackla (four seats) ===
Brackla 2004
Party	Candidate	Votes	%	±%
Labour	David Sage *	773	33.3	
Labour	John Spanswick *	745		
Conservative	Patricia Hacking	740	31.9	
Conservative	Matthew Voisey	623		
Conservative	David Williams	620		
Labour	Anthony Berrow *	583	38.2	
Labour	Briony Davies *	576		
Liberal Democrats	Catherine Jenkins	542	23.4	
Liberal Democrats	Kathryn Norman	466		
Liberal Democrats	Paul Warren	460		
Liberal Democrats	Suleman Hawas	456		
CPA	Debra Hill	266	11.5	

=== Bryncethin (one seat) ===
Bryncethin 2004
Party	Candidate	Votes	%	±%
Labour	Gary Thomas	140	51.5	
Liberal Democrats	Denis Moon	132	48.5	

=== Bryncoch (one seat) ===
Bryncoch 2004
Party	Candidate	Votes	%	±%
Independent	Leslie Phillips *	278	52.2	
Labour	Patricia Penpraze	177	33.2	
Liberal Democrats	Ian Lewis	78	14.6	

=== Bryntirion, Laleston and Merthyr Mawr (two seats) ===
Bryntirion, Laleston and Merthyr Mawr 2004
Party	Candidate	Votes	%	±%
Liberal Democrats	Cheryl Green *	874	55.8	
Liberal Democrats	Melvyn Mathias *	747		
Conservative	Richard Bevington	346	22.1	
Labour	Gwendoline Bradford	345	22.0	
Conservative	Keith Vivian	342		
Labour	Peter Faulkner	277		

=== Caerau (three seats) ===
Caerau 2004
Party	Candidate	Votes	%	±%
Independent	Stephen Smith	911	47.9	
Independent	Kenneth Hunt	809		
Labour	Keith Rowlands *	760	40.0	
Labour	David O'Gorman *	633		
Labour	Peter Simmons	622		
Liberal Democrats	Lynwen Lewis	229	12.1	
Liberal Democrats	Maureen Rousell	165		

=== Cefn Cribwr (one seat) ===
Cefn Cribwr 2004
Party	Candidate	Votes	%	±%
Labour	Huw David	332	50.6	
Independent	Arthur Granville	187	28.5	
Plaid Cymru	Kevin Burnell	137	20.9	

=== Cefn Glas (one seat) ===
Cefn Glas 2004
Party	Candidate	Votes	%	±%
Labour	Cleone Westwood *	183	39.9	
Independent	Elizabeth Kendall	168	36.6	
Liberal Democrats	Alexander Marshall	108	23.5	

=== Coity (one seat) ===
Coity 2004
Party	Candidate	Votes	%	±%
Liberal Democrats	Jacqueline Radford	189	50.9	
Labour	Eleanor Dodd *	182	49.1	

=== Cornelly (two seats) ===
Cornelly 2004
Party	Candidate	Votes	%	±%
Independent	Jefferson Tildesley *	1,235	59.0	
Labour	Richard Granville *	632	30.2	
Labour	Megan Butcher	606		
Independent	Audrey Thomas	606		
Liberal Democrats	Billy Kelly	226	10.8	

=== Coychurch Lower (one seat) ===
Coychurch Lower 2004
Party	Candidate	Votes	%	±%
Independent	Peter Evans *	330	66.5	
Labour	Alan Fleming	166	33.5	

=== Felindre (one seat) ===
Felindre 2004
Party	Candidate	Votes	%	±%
Labour	Michael Gregory *	397	58.7	
Conservative	Colin Hewlett	279	41.3	

=== Hendre (two seats) ===
Hendre 2004
Party	Candidate	Votes	%	±%
Liberal Democrats	Kim Watkins	585	62.0	
Liberal Democrats	Jim Hipkiss	458		
Labour	Jim Hipkiss *	359	38.0	
Labour	Douglas John *	334		

=== Litchard (one seat) ===
Litchard 2004
Party	Candidate	Votes	%	±%
Conservative	Donald Brett	245	30.4	
Liberal Democrats	Muriel Howells	239	29.7	
Independent	Sally Hyde	172	21.3	
Labour	Heather Griffiths	150	18.6	

=== Llangeinor (one seat) ===
Llangeinor 2004
Party	Candidate	Votes	%	±%
Labour	Marlene Thomas	170	57.4	
Independent	Colin Evans *	126	42.6	

=== Llangewydd and Brynhyfryd (one seat) ===
Llangewydd and Brynhyfryd 2004
Party	Candidate	Votes	%	±%
Liberal Democrats	Clifford Hughes	285	45.7	
Labour	Malcolm Francis *	227	36.4	
Conservative	Keith Rowe	111	17.8	

=== Llangynwyd (one seat) ===
Llangynwyd 2004
Party	Candidate	Votes	%	±%
Independent	Mari Jones *	465	45.0	
Plaid Cymru	Robert James	345	33.4	
Labour	Idris Williams	223	21.6	

=== Maesteg East (two seats) ===
Maesteg East 2004
Party	Candidate	Votes	%	±%
Independent	William Evans *	908	47.5	
Labour	William May	627	32.8	
Labour	Malcolm Reeves	555		
Plaid Cymru	Allyn Rees	376	19.7	

=== Maesteg West (two seats) ===
Maesteg West 2004
Party	Candidate	Votes	%	±%
Labour	William Teesdale *	630	44.9	
Labour	Donald Buttle *	571		
Plaid Cymru	John Williams	472	33.6	
Plaid Cymru	Wayne Howells	404		
Independent	William Phillips	302	21.5	

=== Morfa (two seats) ===
Morfa 2004
Party	Candidate	Votes	%	±%
Liberal Democrats	Ernest Foley *	520	43.6	
Liberal Democrats	Beverley Quennell	423		
Labour	Dennis Davey	363	30.4	
Labour	Hayden Morgan	344		
Conservative	Russell Pearce	311	26.0	

=== Nant-y-moel (one seat) ===
Nant-y-moel 2004
Party	Candidate	Votes	%	±%
Independent	Ralph Hughes *	348	53.5	
Labour	Enyd Lock	242	37.2	
Plaid Cymru	David Luke	61	9.4	

=== Newcastle (two seats) ===
Newcastle 2004
Party	Candidate	Votes	%	±%
Conservative	Margaret Bertorelli	548	31.0	
Conservative	Gareth Lewis	482		
Liberal Democrats	John Isaac	452	25.6	
Labour	Hugh Morris *	428	24.2	
Liberal Democrats	Anthony Childs-Cutler	390		
Labour	Anita Byrne	383		
Independent	Tony Smith	340	19.2	

=== Newton (one seat) ===
Newton 2004
Party	Candidate	Votes	%	±%
Conservative	David Anderson *	667	52.3	
Labour	Paul Winstanley	338	26.5	
Liberal Democrats	Michael Clarke	270	21.2	

=== Nottage (one seat) ===
Nottage 2004
Party	Candidate	Votes	%	±%
Conservative	David Greaves	512	42.0	
Liberal Democrats	Norah Clarke	451	37.0	
Labour	Kenneth Rees	255	20.9	

=== Ogmore Vale (one seat) ===
Ogmore Vale 2004
Party	Candidate	Votes	%	±%
Plaid Cymru	Michael Quick	423	51.4	
Labour	Robert Thomas *	400	48.6	

=== Oldcastle (two seats) ===
Oldcastle 2004
Party	Candidate	Votes	%	±%
Liberal Democrats	Robert Burns	510	29.3	
Liberal Democrats	Eileen McIlveen	503		
Conservative	David Unwin	495	28.4	
Labour	Edith Hughes *	466	26.7	
Conservative	Maisie Williams	451		
Labour	Richard Young *	348		
Green	Jonathan Spink	272	15.6	

=== Pendre (one seat) ===
Pendre 2004
Party	Candidate	Votes	%	±%
Liberal Democrats	Michael Simmonds	234	38.8	
Labour	Gary Griffiths	210	34.8	
Conservative	Michael John	159	26.4	

=== Penprysg (one seat) ===
Penprysg 2004
Party	Candidate	Votes	%	±%
Labour	Lilian Davies *	Unopposed		

=== Pen-y-fai (one seat) ===
Pen-y-fai 2004
Party	Candidate	Votes	%	±%
Liberal Democrats	Meryl Wilkins *	643	80.4	
Labour	Brian Rees	157	19.6	

=== Pontycymmer (one seat) ===
Pontycymmer 2004
Party	Candidate	Votes	%	±%
Labour	Reginald Jenkins	350	48.1	
Independent	Simon Foster *	255	35.0	
Independent	Vikki Efford	123	16.9	

=== Porthcawl East Central (one seat) ===
Porthcawl East Central 2004
Party	Candidate	Votes	%	±%
Labour	Alana Davies *	241	25.2	
Independent	Avril Lake	236	24.7	
Liberal Democrats	Jennifer Coombs	187	19.5	
Conservative	Philip Rixon	153	16.0	
Independent	Steven Thomas	140	14.6	

=== Porthcawl West Central (one seat) ===
Porthcawl West Central 2004
Party	Candidate	Votes	%	±%
Conservative	Katherine Deere	330	31.9	
Labour	Madeleine Moon *	273	26.4	
Independent	Peter Hubbard-Miles	233	22.5	
Liberal Democrats	Pamela Chapman	200	19.3	

=== Pyle (three seats) ===
Pyle 2004
Party	Candidate	Votes	%	±%
Labour	Cheryl Butcher	1,041	66.3	
Labour	Megan Inglesant *	901		
Labour	Clive James	896		
Plaid Cymru	Richard Lewis	529	33.7	
Plaid Cymru	Bernard Thomas	506		
Plaid Cymru	Janet Portsmouth	478		

=== Rest Bay (one seat) ===
Rest Bay 2004
Party	Candidate	Votes	%	±%
Liberal Democrats	Gerald Davies *	481	52.3	
Conservative	Christopher Smart	277	30.1	
Labour	Anthony Palmer	161	17.5	

=== Sarn (one seat) ===
Sarn 2004
Party	Candidate	Votes	%	±%
Labour	Melvyn Nott *	541	58.2	
Liberal Democrats	(Ms) N. Clarke	364	39.2	
Independent	I. Hampton	24	2.6	

The vote was postponed in this ward until 22 July.

=== Ynysawdre (one seat) ===
Ynysawdre 2004
Party	Candidate	Votes	%	±%
Labour	(Ms) Lyn Morgan *	440	61.7	
Liberal Democrats	Bernice McLeer	273	38.3	

* retiring councillor in the ward standing for re-election
