= List of electoral wards in Bridgend County Borough =

Pre-2022 ward map of Bridgend County Borough

This list of electoral wards in Bridgend County Borough includes council wards, which elect councillors to Bridgend County Borough Council and community wards, which elect councillors to community councils. As of 2022, there are 28 county borough wards and 49 community council wards.

== Wards 1995 ==
At the 1995 elections to Bridgend County Borough Council 48 county councillors were elected from 28 electoral wards, as follows (numbers of councillors in brackets):

- Bettws (1)
- Blackmill (1)
- Blaengarw (1)
- Brackla (1)
- Caerau (2)
- Cefn Cribwr (1)
- Coity Higher (2)
- Cornelly (2)
- Coychurch Lower (1)
- Laleston/Merthyr Mawr (3)
- Llangeinor (1)
- Llangynwyd (1)
- Maesteg East (2)
- Maesteg West (2)
- Morfa (2)
- Nantyffyllon (1)
- Nant-y-Moel (1)
- Newcastle (2)
- Newcastle Higher (1)
- Ogmore Vale (1)
- Oldcastle (2)
- Pencoed (3)
- Pontycymmer (1)
- Porthcawl East (3)
- Porthcawl West (4)
- Pyle (3)
- St Bride's Minor (2)
- Ynysawdre (1)

== Wards 1999 ==
Since The County Borough of Bridgend (Electoral Arrangements) Order 1998 (and from the 1999 county council elections) the county borough has been divided into 39 electoral wards electing 54 county councillors. Six of these wards are coterminous with communities (civil parishes) of the same name. Some communities have their own elected council. The following table lists council wards, communities and associated geographical areas. Communities with a community council are indicated with a '*':

Ward	County councillors	Communities	Community wards
Aberkenfig	1	Llangynwyd Lower*; Newcastle Higher* (part)	Aberkenfig
Bettws	1	Garw Valley* (part)	Bettws
Blackmill	1	Ogmore Valley* (part)	Blackmill; Evanstown
Blaengarw	1	Garw Valley* (part)	Blaengarw
Brackla	4	Brackla*	
Bryncethin	1	St Bride's Minor* (part)	Bryncethin
Bryncoch	1	St Bride's Minor* (part)	Bryncoch
Bryntirion, Laleston and Merthyr Mawr	2	Merthyr Mawr*; Laleston* (part)	Laleston/Bryntirion
Caerau	3	Maesteg* (part)	Caerau; Nantyffyllon
Cefn Cribwr	1	Cefn Cribwr*	
Cefn Glas	1	Laleston* (part)	Cefn Glas 1
Coity	1	Coity Higher* (part)	Coity
Cornelly	2	Cornelly*	
Coychurch Lower	1	Coychurch Lower*	
Felindre	1	Pencoed* (part)	Felindre
Hendre	2	Pencoed* (part)	Hendre
Litchard	1	Coity Higher (part)	Litchard
Llangeinor	1	Garw Valley* (part)	Llangeinor
Llangewydd & Brynhyfryd	1	Laleston* (part)	Cefn Glas 2
Llangynwyd	1	Llangynwyd Middle*	
Maesteg East	2	Maesteg* (part)	Maesteg East
Maesteg West	2	Maesteg* (part)	Maesteg West
Morfa	2	Bridgend Town* (part)	Morfa
Nant-y-Moel	1	Ogmore Valley* (part)	Nant-y-Moel
Newcastle	2	Bridgend Town* (part)	Newcastle
Newton	1	Porthcawl Town* (part)	Newton
Nottage	1	Porthcawl Town* (part)	Nottage
Ogmore Vale	1	Ogmore Valley* (part)	Ogmore Vale
Oldcastle	2	Bridgend Town* (part)	Oldcastle
Pendre	1	Coity Higher* (part)	Pendre
Penprysg	1	Coychurch Higher*; Pencoed* (part)	Penprysg
Pen-y-fai	1	Newcastle Higher* (part)	Pen-y-fai
Pontycymmer	1	Garw Valley* (part)	Pontycymmer
Porthcawl East Central	1	Porthcawl Town* (part)	East Central
Porthcawl West Central	1	Porthcawl Town* (part)	West Central
Pyle	3	Pyle*	
Rest Bay	1	Porthcawl Town* (part)	Rest Bay
Sarn	1	St Bride's Minor* (part)	Sarn
Ynysawdre	1	Ynysawdre*	Tondu; Brynmenyn

* = Communities which elect a community council

== 2019 review ==
In January 2019 a consultation period began, to review the wards and representation in the county. It was proposed to reduce the number of electoral wards for 39 to 32, with a reduction in councillors from 54 to 52.

The final proposals would see the number of wards reduced from 39 to 28. The number of councillors was to drop from 54 to 51. These changes took effect from the 2022 council election.

== County and community wards 2022 ==
Following The County Borough of Bridgend (Electoral Arrangements) Order 2021 (effective from the 2022 county council elections) the county borough has been divided into 28 electoral wards electing 51 county councillors. Four of the wards are coterminous with communities of the same name. Some communities have their own elected council. There are 49 community council wards electing up to 236 community councillors.

The following table lists council wards, communities and associated geographical areas. Communities with a community council are indicated with a '*':

Ward	County councillors	Communities	Community wards	Community councillors
Aberkenfig	1	Llangynwyd Lower*		
Aberkenfig	1	Newcastle Higher* (part)	Aberkenfig	
Blackmill	1	Ogmore Valley* (part)	Blackmill	
Blackmill	1	Ogmore Valley* (part)	Evanstown	
Brackla East and Coychurch Lower	2	Brackla* (part)	Brackla East	
Brackla East and Coychurch Lower	2	Coychurch Lower*		
Brackla East Central	1	Brackla* (part)	Brackla East Central	
Brackla West	1	Brackla* (part)	Brackla West	
Brackla West Central	1	Brackla* (part)	Brackla West Central	
Bridgend Central	3	Bridgend* (part)	Morfa	6
Bridgend Central	3	Bridgend* (part)	Newcastle	7
Bryntirion, Laleston and Merthyr Mawr	3	Merthyr Mawr*		
Bryntirion, Laleston and Merthyr Mawr	3	Laleston* (part)	Laleston/Bryntirion	
Caerau	2	Maesteg* (part)	Caerau	4
Caerau	2	Maesteg* (part)	Nantyffyllon	2
Cefn Glas	2	Laleston* (part)	Cefn Glas 1	
Cefn Glas	2	Laleston* (part)	Cefn Glas 2	
Coity Higher	3	Coity Higher*	Coity	
Coity Higher	3	Coity Higher*	Litchard	
Coity Higher	3	Coity Higher*	Pendre	
Cornelly ^{c}	2	Cornelly*		8
Garw Valley	3	Garw Valley*	Bettws	
Garw Valley	3	Garw Valley*	Blaengarw	
Garw Valley	3	Garw Valley*	Llangeinor	
Garw Valley	3	Garw Valley*	Pontycymmer	
Llangynwyd	1	Llangynwyd Middle*		
Maesteg East	2	Maesteg* (part)	Maesteg East	
Maesteg West	2	Maesteg* (part)	Maesteg West	
Nant-y-Moel	1	Ogmore Valley* (part)	Nant-y-Moel	
Newton	1	Porthcawl Town* (part)	Newton	3
Nottage	1	Porthcawl Town* (part)	Nottage	3
Ogmore Vale	1	Ogmore Valley* (part)	Ogmore Vale	
Oldcastle	2	Bridgend Town* (part)	Oldcastle	6
Pencoed and Penprysg	3	Coychurch Higher*		
Pencoed and Penprysg	3	Pencoed*	Felindre	
Pencoed and Penprysg	3	Pencoed*	Hendre	
Pencoed and Penprysg	3	Pencoed*	Penprysg	
Pen-y-fai	1	Newcastle Higher* (part)	Pen-y-fai	
Porthcawl East Central	2	Porthcawl Town* (part)	East Central	6
Porthcawl West Central	1	Porthcawl Town* (part)	West Central	3
Pyle, Kenfig Hill and Cefn Cribwr	3	Cefn Cribwr*		
Pyle, Kenfig Hill and Cefn Cribwr	3	Pyle*		
Rest Bay	1	Porthcawl Town* (part)	Rest Bay	3
St Bride's Minor and Ynysawdre	3	St Bride's Minor*	Bryncethin	2
St Bride's Minor and Ynysawdre	3	St Bride's Minor*	Bryncoch	5
St Bride's Minor and Ynysawdre	3	St Bride's Minor*	Sarn	6
St Bride's Minor and Ynysawdre	3	Ynysawdre*	Tondu	6
St Bride's Minor and Ynysawdre	3	Ynysawdre*	Brynmenyn	4

== See also ==
- List of electoral wards in Mid Glamorgan
- List of electoral wards in Wales
