= List of communities in Bridgend County Borough =

The communities of Bridgend County Borough in 2024.

Bridgend County Borough is a county borough in the south-east of Wales. It is one of the 22 principal areas of Wales.

Communities are the lowest tier of local government in Wales. Unlike English counties, which often contain unparished areas, all Welsh principal areas are entirely divided into communities.

There are 20 communities in Bridgend County Borough, with Ogmore Valley being the largest and Porthcawl the most populated. All of them have a community council, with four calling themselves town councils in Bridgend, Maesteg, Pencoed and Porthcawl.

== List of communities in Bridgend County Borough ==
Community		Population (2011)	Area (km^{2}, 2011)	Pre-1974 district	Remarks	Refs	Location map
English	Welsh	Population (2011)	Area (km^{2}, 2011)	Pre-1974 district	Remarks	Refs	Location map
Brackla	Bracla	11,749	3.21	Bridgend Urban District			
Bridgend	Pen-y-Bont ar Ogwr	14,912	6.5	Bridgend Urban District	Town.		
Cefn Cribwr	Cefn Cribwr	1,481	7.48	Pen-y-bont Rural District			
Coity Higher	Coety Uchaf	6,078	6.78	Pen-y-bont Rural District	Includes Coity and Litchard.		
Cornelly	Corneli	7,059	16.61	Pen-y-bont Rural District	Created in 2002 from the community of Cynffig. Includes North Cornelly, South Cornelly and Kenfig.		
Coychurch Higher	Llangrallo Uchaf	888	15.19	Pen-y-bont Rural District	Includes Heol-y-Cyw.		
Coychurch Lower	Llangrallo Isaf	1,365	6.81	Pen-y-bont Rural District	Includes Coychurch.		
Garw Valley	Cwm Garw	7,784	30.9	Ogmore and Garw Rural District	Includes Bettws, Blaengarw, Llangeinor and Pontycymer.		
Laleston	Trelales	1,365	6.81	Pen-y-bont Rural District	Includes Broadlands, Cefn Glas and Tythegston.		
Llangynwyd Lower	Llangynwyd Isaf	440	8.89	Pen-y-bont Rural District	Includes Coytrahen.		
Llangynwyd Middle	Llangynwyd Ganol	3,032	13.51	Pen-y-bont Rural District	Includes Cwmfelin and Llangynwyd.		
Maesteg	Maesteg	17,580	27.21	Maesteg Urban District	Town.		
Merthyr Mawr	Merthyr Mawr	267	14.67	Pen-y-bont Rural District	Includes Tythegston.		
Newcastle Higher	Y Castellnewydd ar Ogwr	4,046	6.62	Pen-y-bont Rural District	Includes Aberkenfig and Pen-y-fai.		
Ogmore Valley	Cwm Ogwr	7,954	38.47	Ogmore and Garw Rural District	Includes Nantymoel, Ogmore Vale, Price Town and Wyndham.		
Pencoed	Pen-coed	9,166	8.78	Pen-y-bont Rural District	Town.		
Porthcawl	Porthcawl	16,005	13.39	Porthcawl Urban District	Town.		
Pyle	Y Pîl	7,405	3.23	Pen-y-bont Rural District	Created in 2002 from the community of Cynffig. Includes Kenfig Hill.		
St Bride's Minor	Llansanffraid-ar-Ogwr	6,014	10.34	Pen-y-bont Rural District	Includes Abergarw, Bryncethin and Sarn.		
Ynysawdre	Ynysawdre	3,367	1.91	Pen-y-bont Rural District	Includes Brynmenyn and Tondu.		
