= 1991 Ogwr Borough Council election =

Local election in Wales

The 1991 Ogwr Borough Council election was held on Thursday 2 May 1991 to Ogwr Borough Council, a district council in Mid Glamorgan, Wales. It took place on the same day as other council elections in Wales and England. These were to be the last elections before re-organization of local government in Wales and dissolution of the council.

The previous full election took place in 1987.

== Overview ==
These were the last elections to Ogwr Borough Council before local government reorganisation, which would see new unitary local authorities created in Wales from 1 April 1996. Elections to the new Bridgend County Borough Council would take place in May 1995.

Results for only fifteen of the twenty nine electoral wards were confirmed overnight, with the remainder of the wards having their results announced on the Friday. Leader of the Conservatives on the council, David Unwin, was one of the first to retain his seat, coming top of the poll in Coity Higher.

49 council seats were up for election, a similar number to the previous election in 1987.

== Election result ==
1991 Ogwr Borough Council election result
Party	Seats	Gains	Losses	Net gain/loss	Seats %	Votes %	Votes	+/−
Labour	39				79.6			
Conservative	8				16.3			
Liberal Democrats	1				2.0			
Independent Labour	1				2.0			
Independent	0				0.0			
Plaid Cymru	0				0.0			
Green	0				0.0			

== Ward results ==
Contests took place in 21 of the 29 wards, with councillors in eight of the wards being elected unopposed.^{(a)}

=== Bettws (one seat) ===
Bettws 1991
Party	Candidate	Votes	%	±%
Labour	C. Michaelides *	689	78.0	
Independent	J. Ward	194	22.0	

=== Blackmill (one seat) ===
Blackmill 1991
Party	Candidate	Votes	%	±%
Labour	M. Tremellen	Unopposed		

=== Blaengarw (one seat) ===
Blaengarw 1991
Party	Candidate	Votes	%	±%
Labour	R. Williams	443	46.4	
Independent	D. Mordecai	385	40.4	
Independent	R. Smiles	126	13.2	

=== Brackla (one seat) ===
Brackla 1991
Party	Candidate	Votes	%	±%
Conservative	(Ms) P. Hacking *	713	39.2	
Labour	A. Thomas	694	38.2	
Liberal Democrats	R. Mathews	412	22.6	

=== Caerau (two seats) ===
Caerau 1991
Party	Candidate	Votes	%	±%
Labour	M. Fitzgibbon *	Unopposed		
Labour	J. Thomas *	Unopposed		

=== Cefn Cribwr (one seat) ===
Cefn Cribwr 1991
Party	Candidate	Votes	%	±%
Labour	V. Thomas *	453	58.1	
Plaid Cymru	K. Burnell	266	34.1	
Conservative	K. Vivian	61	7.8	

=== Coity Higher (two seats) ===
Coity Higher 1991
Party	Candidate	Votes	%	±%
Conservative	David Unwin *	1,063	52.8	
Labour	S. Dodd	951	47.2	
Conservative	(Ms) J. Spurgeon *	946		
Labour	N. Williams	841		

=== Cornelly (two seats) ===
Cornelly 1991
Party	Candidate	Votes	%	±%
Labour	F. Teale *	1,702	81.7	
Labour	A. Mason *	1,501		
Conservative	M. Powell	381	18.3	

=== Coychurch Lower (one seat) ===
Coychurch Lower 1991
Party	Candidate	Votes	%	±%
Conservative	J. Lewis *	502	48.2	
Independent	J. Richards	352	33.8	
Labour	E. Davies	187	18.0	

=== Laleston (three seats) ===
Laleston 1991
Party	Candidate	Votes	%	±%
Labour	G. Evans *	1,225	50.2	
Labour	D. Webb *	1,109		
Labour	(Ms) C. Westwood *	1,098		
Conservative	(Ms) G. Rowe	738	30.2	
Conservative	(Ms) J. Phillips	617		
Conservative	(Ms) I. Robinson	578		
Plaid Cymru	Laura McAllister	478	19.6	
Plaid Cymru	(Ms) A. McAllister	425		

=== Llangeinor (one seat) ===
Llangeinor 1991
Party	Candidate	Votes	%	±%
Labour	C. G. Evans	Unopposed		

=== Llangynwyd (one seat) ===
Cornelly 1991
Party	Candidate	Votes	%	±%
Labour	R. Lewis *	528	57.3	
Plaid Cymru	A. Rees	393	42.7	

=== Maesteg East (two seats) ===
Maesteg East 1991
Party	Candidate	Votes	%	±%
Labour	W. B. Evans *	Unopposed		
Labour	J. H. Jones	Unopposed		

=== Maesteg West (two seats) ===
Maesteg West 1991
Party	Candidate	Votes	%	±%
Labour	T. O. Rees *	Unopposed		
Labour	E. V. Thomas *	Unopposed		

=== Morfa (two seats) ===
Morfa (Bridgend) 1991
Party	Candidate	Votes	%	±%
Labour	(Ms) I. Jones *	963	64.1	
Labour	E. Foley	871		
Conservative	(Ms) E. Chard	539	35.9	
Conservative	W. Rutter *	500		

=== Nantyffyllon (one seat) ===
Nantyffyllon 1991
Party	Candidate	Votes	%	±%
Labour	G. Devine *	Unopposed		

=== Nant-y-moel (one seat) ===
Nant-y-moel 1991
Party	Candidate	Votes	%	±%
Labour	(Ms) M. Williams	Unopposed		

=== Newcastle (two seats) ===
Newcastle (Bridgend) 1991
Party	Candidate	Votes	%	±%
Labour	H. Morris	952	52.2	
Labour	R. Bowser	887		
Conservative	F. Bertorelli *	873	47.8	
Conservative	K. Rowe *	804		

=== Newcastle Higher (one seat) ===
Newcastle Higher 1991
Party	Candidate	Votes	%	±%
Labour	M. J. Thomas *	700	50.7	
Conservative	(Ms) J. R. L. Padmore	504	36.5	
Plaid Cymru	R. A. Fattorini	177	12.8	

=== Ogmore Vale (one seat) ===
Ogmore Vale 1991
Party	Candidate	Votes	%	±%
Labour	(Ms) C. Bishop *	Unopposed		

=== Oldcastle (two seats) ===
Oldcastle (Bridgend) 1991
Party	Candidate	Votes	%	±%
Conservative	D. Williams *	722	56.7	
Conservative	(Ms) G. Griffiths *	674		
Labour	(Ms) M. Rogers	552	43.3	

=== Pencoed (three seats) ===
Pencoed 1991
Party	Candidate	Votes	%	±%
Labour	F. Embling *	1,723	58.9	
Labour	D. Davies *	1,598		
Labour	K. King *	1,469		
Conservative	(Ms) L. Mackie	1,200	41.1	
Conservative	(Ms) N. Prentice	1,165		
Conservative	B. Rice	978		

=== Pontycymmer (one seat) ===
Pontycymmer 1991
Party	Candidate	Votes	%	±%
Labour	(Ms) H. Griffiths	568	68.9	
Independent	(Ms) M. Hawkins *	256	31.1	

=== Porthcawl East (three seats) ===
Porthcawl East 1991
Party	Candidate	Votes	%	±%
Labour	A. Anthony	1,292	51.3	
Conservative	D. Anderson *	1,228	48.7	
Labour	(Ms) A. Lake	1,183		
Labour	P. Jones	1,164		
Conservative	(Ms) K. Deere *	1,116		
Conservative	J. Pritchard *	1,000		

=== Porthcawl West (four seats) ===
Porthcawl West 1991
Party	Candidate	Votes	%	±%
Conservative	Peter Hubbard-Miles	1,385	32.0	
Liberal Democrats	G. Davies	1,159	26.7	
Labour	R. Griffiths *	1,137	26.2	
Labour	Madeleine Moon	1,060		
Conservative	G. Fairley *	979		
Conservative	(Ms) R. Garrett	978		
Labour	(Ms) J. Ryan	924		
Conservative	D. John	885		
Labour	M. Hooper	883		
Liberal Democrats	J. Williams	880		
Conservative	C. Smart	827		
Conservative	D. Newton-Williams	781		
Conservative	(Ms) D. De Laroque *	674		
Plaid Cymru	E. Merriman	653	15.1	

The Conservatives in Porthcawl had fallen out with one another, leading to seven candidates vying for the four seats.

=== Pyle (three seats) ===
Pyle 1991
Party	Candidate	Votes	%	±%
Labour	J. Irvine *	1,835	84.1	
Labour	R. Power *	1,746		
Labour	(Ms) M. Butcher	1,738		
Conservative	R. Preston	347	15.9	

=== St Brides Major (one seat) ===
St Brides Major 1991
Party	Candidate	Votes	%	±%
Conservative	(Ms) A. J. Preston *	701	62.0	
Labour	E. A. Bowers	429	38.0	

=== St Brides Minor (two seats) ===
St Brides Minor 1991
Party	Candidate	Votes	%	±%
Labour	Glan Walters *	1,157	44.9	
Independent Labour	Mel Winter *	1,021	39.6	
Labour	Melvyn E. G. Nott	871		
Conservative	M. G. Butler	401	15.5	

Mel Winter, a ward councillor since 1983, had been de-selected as a Labour candidate. He stood and won as an independent.

=== Ynysawdre (one seat) ===
Ynysawdre 1991
Party	Candidate	Votes	%	±%
Labour	W. Burt *	828	84.8	
Conservative	(Ms) H. Evans	148	15.2	

(a) Elections Centre source compares the percentage vote of the lead candidate for each party in the ward. It also indicates which candidates are female. It indicates which candidates are sitting councillors standing for re-election

* retiring councillor in the ward standing for re-election
