= List of scheduled monuments in Bridgend County Borough =

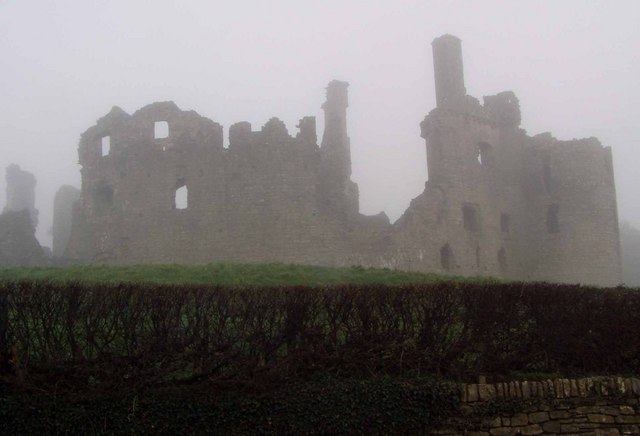
Coity Castle, Bridgend, one of the 57 scheduled monuments in Bridgend County Borough

Bridgend County Borough stretches from the south coast of Wales up to the southern edge of the Brecon Beacons. The 57 scheduled monuments cover over 4,000 years of the history of this part of South Wales. There are chambered tombs of the Neolithic, and burial cairns and standing stones of the Bronze Age, Iron Age hillforts, and a Roman villa. Four early medieval sites and 23 from the medieval post-Norman period cover defences, dwellings, stones and churches. Finally the modern period, beginning with an Elizabethan manor house, marks 400 years of industrial history, and ends at defenses from World War II. All of the sites on this list (and the whole of Bridgend County Borough) are within the historic county of Glamorgan.

Scheduled monuments have statutory protection. The compilation of the list is undertaken by Cadw Welsh Historic Monuments, which is an executive agency of the National Assembly of Wales. The list of scheduled monuments below is supplied by Cadw with additional material from RCAHMW and Glamorgan-Gwent Archaeological Trust.

== Scheduled monuments in Bridgend ==
Image	Name	Site type	Community	Location	Details	Period	SAM No & Refs
Coity Burial Chamber	Coity Burial Chamber	Chambered tomb	Coity Higher	51.5262°N 3.5482°W, SS926819	Ruins of a Neolithic chambered tomb, with four large stone slabs	Prehistoric (Neolithic)	GM068
	Tythegston Long Barrow	Long barrow	Merthyr Mawr	51.5008°N 3.6371°W, SS864792	Chambered tomb toward the east end of a long mound	Prehistoric (Neolithic)	GM022
	Ogof y Pebyll Bone Cave	Cave	Pencoed	51.5159°N 3.5131°W, SS951807	Cave in which have been found flint flakes and the teeth of numerous mammals	Prehistoric (Neolithic or Bronze Age?)	GM434
	Bryn Defaid Mound	Round cairn	Garw Valley	51.6126°N 3.6071°W, SS888916	Bronze Age cairn on the ridge between Maesteg and Blaengarw	Prehistoric (Bronze Age)	GM249
	Round Barrow on the Werfa	Round barrow	Ogmore Valley, (also Garw Valley)	51.6359°N 3.5711°W, SS913941	Round barrow on the crest of the Mynnydd Llangweinwyr ridge	Prehistoric (Bronze Age)	GM499
	Bridgend Standing Stone	Standing stone	Bridgend	51.5039°N 3.5832°W, SS902795	Standing stone with several feint 'cup mark' decorations. It stands by a footpath that leads to Bridgend Bowls Club	Prehistoric (Bronze Age)	GM145
	Cefn Cross Standing Stone	Standing stone	Cefn Cribwr	51.5314°N 3.6248°W, SS873826	Standing stone, 2m high, triangular in section, and tapering to a blunt point. Further stones may once have stood in the vicinity.	Prehistoric (Bronze Age)	GM241
	Garn Lwyd Cairn	Round cairn	Garw Valley	51.5997°N 3.5609°W, SS919901	A stone-filled hole just below the crest of a hill on Llangeinor Common, between the Garw and Ogmore valleys	Prehistoric (Bronze Age)	GM238
	Groes y Bwlchgwyn Round Cairn	Round cairn	Garw Valley	51.605°N 3.6055°W, SS889907	Possible round barrow, now in impenetrable pine forest.	Prehistoric (Bronze Age)	GM250
	Carn y Hyrddod	Round cairn	Ogmore Valley	51.629°N 3.5618°W, SS919934	Grass covered mound in a commanding position on Llangeinor Common	Prehistoric (Bronze Age)	GM243
	Mynydd Caerau Round Cairns	Round cairn	Maesteg	51.6373°N 3.6058°W, SS889943	A group of 6 cairns around the summit of Mynydd Caerau	Prehistoric (Bronze Age)	GM232
	Mynydd Herbert Round Barrow	Round barrow	Merthyr Mawr	51.5057°N 3.6564°W, SS851798	Burial cairn 2m high covered in stones, possibly cleared from nearby fields, in the corner of a field 1 km north of Tythegston	Prehistoric (Bronze Age)	GM025
	Hutchwns round barrow	Round barrow	Porthcawl	51.4849°N 3.7098°W, SS813776	Partial survival of a round barrow near a public park. A modern standing stone has been placed alongside it.	Prehistoric (Bronze Age)	GM103
	Pant-y-Pyllau Enclosure	Earthwork (unclassified)	Coity Higher	51.5306°N 3.5478°W, SS927824	Banked enclosure with external ditches. Parts destroyed by farm buildings and tracks.	Prehistoric (Unknown)	GM426
	Mynydd y Gaer	Hillfort	Coychurch Higher	51.5544°N 3.482°W, SS973849	Hillfort enclosing 1ha of land, with a pronounced bank and ditch	Prehistoric (Iron Age)	GM084
	Ty'n y Warn Camp, Cwm Llwyd	Hillfort	Coychurch Higher	51.5565°N 3.5178°W, SS948852	An Iron Age hillfort near Ty'n y Warn farm, on a low spur in the Cwm Llwyd valley	Prehistoric (Iron Age)	GM356
	Twmpath Diwlith Round Barrow	Round barrow	Maesteg, (also Margam)	51.5858°N 3.687°W, SS832887	Round barrow which contained burnt bones, excavated in 1921	Prehistoric	GM557
	Y Bwlwarcau (The Bulwarks)	Hillfort	Llangynwyd Middle	51.5839°N 3.6771°W, SS839885	Iron Age enclosure, but with earlier and later occupations, including medieval house platforms	Prehistoric (Iron Age)	GM059
Dunes of Merthyr Mawr Warren, to the north of Traeth yr Afon	Merthyr Mawr Warren	Unclassified site	Merthyr Mawr	51.4813°N 3.6386°W, SS863770	Area of dunes within which numerous burial sites and other findspots have been uncovered, especially during sand and gravel extraction	Prehistoric	GM432
Pen y castell Hillfort	Pen-y-Castell Camp	Hillfort	Pyle	51.5312°N 3.6704°W, SS842826	Hillfort enclosure east of Pyle	Prehistoric (Iron Age)	GM240
	Chapel Hill Camp	Hillfort	Merthyr Mawr	51.4906°N 3.6018°W, SS889780	Small hilltop camp. St Roques chapel, lying within the enclosure, gives its name to the hill.	Prehistoric (Iron Age)	GM248
Farmland east of Tythegston, within the enclosure	Cae Summerhouse Camp	Enclosure	Merthyr Mawr	51.4894°N 3.6375°W, SS864779	Settlement site with intensive 1st to 4th century occupation in a defended enclosure	Prehistoric (Iron Age & Roman)	GM102
	Dan-y-Graig Roman villa	Villa	Porthcawl	51.4893°N 3.6717°W, SS840780	Roman villa with agricultural buildings. Partly excavated in 1985-86	Roman (Mainly 3rd-4th centuries)	GM587
	Nottage Court Inscribed Stone	Inscribed stone	Porthcawl	51.49°N 3.7005°W, SS820781	Roman milestone with 3 Latin inscriptions plus possible Ogham moved to its current location in a garden at Nottage Court in the 19th century, from SS763890, now Port Talbot Docks	Roman	GM040
	Bwlch yr Afan Dyke	Dyke	Ogmore Valley	51.6444°N 3.5617°W, SS920951	192m long double bank with central ditch, crossing a saddle south of Werfa summit	Early Medieval (8th or 9th century)	GM246
	Coychurch Celtic Cross-Shaft in Church	Cross	Coychurch Lower	51.5062°N 3.5294°W, SS939796	Celtic Cross, inscribed 'EBISSAR/S?'	Early Medieval (11th century)	GM213
Pre-Norman stones at St Teilo Churchyard, Merthyr Mawr	Merthyr Mawr pre-Norman Stones	Cross base	Merthyr Mawr	51.4856°N 3.6105°W, SS882775	A series of locally found stone pillars, slabs and crosses, now housed in a shelter within Merthyr Mawr St Teilo churchyard	Early Medieval	GM169
	Vervil Dyke	Dyke	Merthyr Mawr	51.4848°N 3.6014°W, SS889774	A bank and ditch runs between the rivers Ogmore and Eweny. Traces of a parallel bank imply a settlement enclosure	Early Medieval	GM465
	Mynydd Ty Talwyn Ancient Farms 1	House platform	Llangynwyd Lower	51.5628°N 3.651°W, SS856861	House platforms near summit of Ty-Talwyn	Medieval	GM092
	Mynydd Ty Talwyn Ancient Farms 2	House platform	Llangynwyd Lower	51.5637°N 3.6463°W, SS859862	House platforms on west side of Ty-Talwyn	Medieval	GM093
	Croes Siencyn Incised Stone	Cross-marked stone	Cornelly	51.5275°N 3.6989°W, SS822823	Badly weathered incised cross, standing in a garden in Marlas Road, Pyle	Medieval	GM036
	Conbelani Stone in St Roque's Chapel	Cross	Merthyr Mawr	51.4908°N 3.6021°W, SS888780	Inscribed pillar cross, originally on the river bank at Merthyr Mawr. Another cross pillar, the Goblin Stone, is also in the ruined chapel	Medieval	GM026
	Cross in Tythegston Churchyard	Cross	Merthyr Mawr	51.4967°N 3.6471°W, SS857788	Sandstone slab set in a modern socket, in St Tudwg's churchyard, Tythegston	Medieval (11th century)	GM214
	Remains of Llangewydd Church & Churchyard	Church	Laleston	51.5161°N 3.6221°W, SS875809	Remains of St Cewydd's Church, demolished in the 13th century	Medieval (11th century)	GM237
Coity Castle, Bridgend	Coity Castle	Castle	Coity Higher	51.5221°N 3.5534°W, SS923814	Circular castle with 3-storey keep. Fell into ruin by the 18th century.	Medieval (12th century)	GM004
	Derwen Moated Site	Moated Site	Coity Higher	51.5304°N 3.5666°W, SS914824	A moat, possibly in former parkland of Coity Castle, with no visible trace of habitation.	Medieval	GM444
Kenfig Castle, the top of the keep is all that emerges from the dunes of Kenfig Burrows	Kenfig Castle & Medieval Town	Castle	Cornelly	51.5292°N 3.7297°W, SS80182	Castle and walled borough, abandoned to the dunes. Castle excavated in 1920s	Medieval (12th century)	GM042
	Llangynwyd Castle	Castle	Llangynwyd Middle	51.5852°N 3.6591°W, SS851886	Medieval fortress with twin-towered gatehouse and curtain walls. Abandoned after the end of the 13th century	Medieval (12th century)	GM085
Newcastle Castle, Bridgend – a Norman doorway	Newcastle Castle, Bridgend	Castle	Bridgend	51.5089°N 3.583°W, SS902800	Built from 1180s, it has a rectangular keep and Norman gateway. Site is a steep hill above the river, in the centre of Bridgend	Medieval (12th century)	GM063
	Stormy Castle	Motte	Cornelly	51.5206°N 3.6647°W, SS845815	Castle Motte built by Geofrey Sturmi. By 1166 it was owned by Margam Abbey	Medieval (12th century)	GM217
	Garth Hill Platform House	Platform house	Maesteg	51.5976°N 3.6305°W, SS871900	Platforms of medieval long hut settlement	Medieval	GM552
Valley of Nant Fadog. The earthworks and platforms are on the right of the picture	Earthwork & Platform Houses N of Nant Fadog	Platform house	Llangynwyd Lower	51.5584°N 3.6462°W, SS859856	Scatter of long hut platforms of a deserted settlement along the Nant Fadog valley side.	Medieval	GM340
	St Roque's Chapel	Chapel	Merthyr Mawr	51.4908°N 3.6021°W, SS888780	Ruined medieval chapel, sited inside Chapel Hill Camp, within the park of Merthyr Mawr House	Medieval	GM247
Lane through the deserted village earthworks of Bryncynan	Bryncynan, Mynydd Ty-talwyn	Deserted Rural Settlement	Llangynwyd Middle	51.5688°N 3.6449°W, SS860868	House platforms and hollow ways of a deserted medieval village	Medieval	GM086
Candelston Castle	Candleston Castle	Manor	Merthyr Mawr	51.4829°N 3.6269°W, SS871772	Lightly fortified manor house overlooking Merthyr Mawr Warren, which continued in occupation until the 19th century.	Medieval (14th century)	GM095
St.Crallo's Church Coychurch. The cross is in front of the Church	Coychurch Churchyard Cross	Cross	Coychurch Lower	51.506°N 3.5293°W, SS939796	Massive stone steps up to a hexagonal cross in St Crallog's churchyard.	Medieval	GM212
Merthyr Mawr Church. The medieval cross is to the left of the church	Merthyr Mawr Churchyard Cross	Cross	Merthyr Mawr	51.4853°N 3.6103°W, SS882774	Octagonal cross with part of its original finial, set in three steps of sandstone	Medieval (14th century)	GM226
Old Bridge, Bridgend	Bridgend Old Bridge	Bridge	Bridgend	51.5068°N 3.5803°W, SS904798	Stone bridge over the river Ogmore, with 3 arches. It is now a footbridge	Medieval (15th century)	GM049
	Cefn Hirgoed Rabbit Warren	Pillow mound	St Bride's Minor, (also Coity Higher)	51.534°N 3.5642°W, SS916828	Three pillow mounds, medieval warrens built to house rabbits. Now alongside the M4, near Sarn Park Services	Medieval	GM491
The Ogmore River and New Inn Bridge	New Inn Bridge	Bridge	Merthyr Mawr	51.4936°N 3.5989°W, SS891783	Stone bridge with 4 arches, near Bridgend. Two openings allow sheep washing, giving an alternate name of 'Dipping Bridge'	Medieval (16th century or older)	GM050
	Plas-y-Betws relict garden	House (domestic)	Garw Valley	51.5685°N 3.5807°W, SS905866	Three walled enclosures of the Tudor gardens of Plas-y-Betws Manor House	Post-Medieval/Modern (16th century)	GM589
	Angleton Iron Works	Industrial monument	Coity Higher	51.5263°N 3.5809°W, SS904820	Built by Robert Sydney in 1589, it was the only pre-1700 ironworks in Glamorgan. Sandstone slabs are the standing remains, part buried by the railway embankment	Post-Medieval/Modern (16th century)	GM265
Cefn Cribwr Ironworks	Cefn Cribwr Ironworks	Ironworks	Cefn Cribwr, (also Margam)	51.5382°N 3.658°W, SS851834	The Bedford Ironworks were built by John Bedford in 1771. Standing remains include 3 kilns, a smelting house and an 1820s beam engine house	Post-Medieval/Modern (18th century)	GM417
	Bryndu Coke Ovens	Coke Oven	Cornelly	51.5383°N 3.6755°W, SS838834	At least 8 brick ovens remain from a large coking plant built in the 1840s	Post-Medieval/Modern (19th century)	GM493
Remains of a blast furnace stack at Maesteg	Maesteg Blast Furnaces	Blast Furnace	Maesteg	51.6114°N 3.6643°W, SS848916	A blast furnace and engine house of the Llynfi Cambrian Ironworks remains standing near the centre of Maesteg. The buried foundations of three more furnaces lie to the north.	Post-Medieval/Modern (19th century)	GM418
Tondu Ironworks	Tondu Ironworks	Ironworks	Ynysawdre	51.5482°N 3.6007°W, SS891844	Well preserved mid 19th century ironworks with coking ovens, blast furnaces and wrought iron works. Now open to the public as Tondu Iron Park	Post-Medieval/Modern (19th century)	GM433
	Royal Ordnance Factory Pillbox	Pillbox	Coychurch Lower	51.5028°N 3.5665°W, SS913793	Two-storey concrete Type 22 pillbox from World War II, built into the Great Central railway embankment, to defend the railway junction	Post-Medieval/Modern	GM605

Scheduled monuments in Bridgend, Wales.
=Prehistoric =Roman =Early Medieval =Medieval =Post-Medieval/Modern

== See also ==
- List of Cadw properties
- List of castles in Wales
- List of hill forts in Wales
- Historic houses in Wales
- List of monastic houses in Wales
- List of museums in Wales
- List of Roman villas in Wales
