= 1995 Bridgend County Borough Council election =

1995 Welsh local government election

The first election to the Bridgend County Borough Council was held on 4 May 1995. It was followed by the 1999 election. On the same day there were elections to the other 21 local authorities in Wales and community councils in Wales.

== Overview ==
All council seats were up for election. These were the first elections held following local government reorganisation and the abolition of Mid Glamorgan County Council. The ward boundaries for the new authority were based on the previous Ogwr Borough Council although the St Brides Major ward had been transferred to the Vale of Glamorgan, reducing councillor numbers by one.

The result of the election was a strong majority for the Labour Party, who made gains across Wales.

Bridgend County Borough Council election result 1995
Party	Seats	Gains	Losses	Net gain/loss	Seats %	Votes %	Votes	+/−
Labour	46				95.8			
Independent	2				4.2			
Conservative	0				0.0			
Liberal Democrats	0				0.0			
Plaid Cymru	0				0.0			
Independent Labour	0				0.0		895	
Green	0				0.0		81	

== Candidates ==
Most sitting members of Mid Glamorgan County council sought election to the new authority. A number were also members of the previous district council but others contested a ward against a sitting district councillor.

KEY

^{o} candidate previously elected to Ogwr Borough Council in 1991
^{+} candidate previously elected to Mid Glamorgan Council in 1993

== Ward results ==
Contests took place in only 16 of the 28 wards, with councillors in 12 wards elected unopposed.

=== Bettws (one seat) ===
Bettws 1995
Party	Candidate	Votes	%	±%
Labour	C. Michaelides ^{o}	Unopposed		

=== Blackmill (one seat) ===
Bettws 1995
Party	Candidate	Votes	%	±%
Labour	H. Davies	Unopposed		

=== Blaengarw (one seat) ===
Blaengarw 1995
Party	Candidate	Votes	%	±%
Labour	(Ms) L. Davies	490	69.3	
Independent	R. Miles	217	30.7	

=== Brackla (one seat) ===
Brackla 1995
Party	Candidate	Votes	%	±%
Labour	D. Sage	1,385	75.0	
Conservative	(Ms) P. Hacking ^{o}	461	25.0	

=== Caerau (two seats) ===
Caerau 1995
Party	Candidate	Votes	%	±%
Labour	V. Hart ^{+}	Unopposed		
Labour	D. O'Gorman	Unopposed		

=== Cefn Cribwr (one seat) ===
Cefn Cribwr 1995
Party	Candidate	Votes	%	±%
Labour	V. Thomas ^{o}	Unopposed		

=== Coity Higher (two seats) ===
Coity Higher 1995
Party	Candidate	Votes	%	±%
Labour	(Ms) M. Ing	868	46.1	
Labour	C. Jones	847		
Conservative	D. Unwin ^{o}	593	31.5	
Conservative	(Ms) R. Llewellyn	427		
Independent	H. Jenkins	422	22.4	
Independent	M. McLoughney	381		

=== Llangeinor (one seat) ===
Llangeinor 1995
Party	Candidate	Votes	%	±%
Labour	C. Evans ^{o}	Unopposed		

=== Nantyffyllon (one seat) ===
Nantyffyllon 1995
Party	Candidate	Votes	%	±%
Labour	G. Devine ^{o}	Unopposed		

=== Ogmore Vale (one seat) ===
Ogmore Vale 1995
Party	Candidate	Votes	%	±%
Labour	R. Thomas	Unopposed		

=== Oldcastle (two seats) ===
Oldcastle 1995
Party	Candidate	Votes	%	±%
Labour	(Ms) E. Hughes	863	68.0	
Labour	R. Young	827		
Conservative	(Ms) G. Griffiths ^{o}	406	32.0	
Conservative	D. Williams ^{o}	379		

=== Pencoed (three seats) ===
Pencoed 1995
Party	Candidate	Votes	%	±%
Labour	K. King ^{o}	Unopposed		
Labour	(Ms) L. Davies	Unopposed		
Labour	D. John ^{+}	Unopposed		

=== Pontycymmer (one seat) ===
Pontycymmer 1995
Party	Candidate	Votes	%	±%
Labour	(Ms) H. Griffiths ^{o}	Unopposed		

=== Porthcawl East (three seats) ===
Porthcawl East 1995
Party	Candidate	Votes	%	±%
Labour	J. Bunker ^{+}	1,479	56.9	
Labour	(Ms) A. Lake ^{o}	1,396		
Labour	(Ms) T. Smith	1,307		
Conservative	D. Anderson ^{o}	873	33.6	
Conservative	(Ms) K. Deere	741		
Conservative	(Ms) C. Middleton	681		
Liberal Democrats	J. Lowes	248	9.5	
Liberal Democrats	(Ms) L. Fearnley	205		
Liberal Democrats	J. Paget	202		

=== Porthcawl West (four seats) ===
Porthcawl West 1995
Party	Candidate	Votes	%	±%
Labour	Madeleine Moon ^{o}	1,425	39.1	
Labour	R. Griffiths ^{o}	1,306		
Labour	D. Evans	1,257		
Labour	(Ms) A. Pendle	1,148		
Conservative	Peter Hubbard-Miles ^{o+}	1,127	30.9	
Liberal Democrats	G. Davies ^{o}	1,093	30.0	
Conservative	T. Davies	973		
Conservative	W. Lewis	968		
Liberal Democrats	W. Williams	866		
Conservative	C. Smart	841		
Liberal Democrats	(Ms) N. Page	829		
Liberal Democrats	D. Richards	794		

=== Pyle (three seats) ===
Pyle 1995
Party	Candidate	Votes	%	±%
Labour	M. Jones ^{+}	Unopposed		
Labour	J. Irvine ^{o}	Unopposed		
Labour	R. Power ^{o}	Unopposed		

=== St Brides Minor (two seats) ===
St Brides Minor 1995
Party	Candidate	Votes	%	±%
Labour	M. Nott ^{+}	1,250	75.8	
Labour	J. Walters	1,206		
Plaid Cymru	B. Jones	400	24.2	

=== Ynysawdre (one seat) ===
Ynysawdre 1995
Party	Candidate	Votes	%	±%
Labour	W. Burt ^{o}	Unopposed		

== See also ==
- List of electoral wards in Bridgend County Borough
