= Brackla East and Coychurch Lower =

Electoral ward in Bridgend County Borough, Wales

Coordinates: 51.502°N 3.535°W

Brackla East and Coychurch Lower (Welsh: Dwyrain Brackla a Llangrallo Isaf) is an electoral ward in Bridgend County Borough, Wales. It covers the community of Coychurch Lower and part of the community of Brackla. The ward elects two councillors to Bridgend County Borough Council.

== Background ==
The 'Brackla East and Coychurch Lower' ward was created following the recommendations of a 2019 local government boundary review by the Local Democracy and Boundary Commission for Wales. This recommended the merger of the former county ward of Coychurch Lower and Brackla's neighbouring community council ward of Brackla East. The boundary review predicted an electorate of 3,375.

Concerns were expressed by Coychurch Lower Community Council that the new ward would be dominated by the larger population of Brackla East.

The changes came into effect from the 2022 local elections.

== 2022 local election ==
Brackla East and Coychurch Lower was one of seven wards in the county borough to allow voting to start on the Tuesday and Wednesday before the election day of Thursday 5 May 2022. The seven wards were identified as having had the lowest turnouts at the 2017 election.

Labour's Eugene Caparros came top of the poll in the May election. After a number of recounts, Labour's Simon Griffiths and Conservative Rebeka Fudge tied for second place. Both Griffiths and Fudge were standing for the first time in a council election. They chose to decide the winner of the second council seat by a blind vote, where the presiding officer chose one of two identical envelopes containing the candidates' names. Griffiths won the second seat by this method.

== See also ==
- List of electoral wards in Bridgend County Borough
- List of electoral wards in Wales
