= 2022 Bridgend County Borough Council election =

2022 Welsh local government election

2022 Bridgend Council election
- 5 May 2022

All 51 seats to Bridgend County Borough Council 26 seats needed for a majority

	First party	Second party
Party	Labour	Independent
Seats won	27	21
Seat change	▲10	▲6
Popular vote	35,134	28,012
Percentage	44.7%	35.6%
Swing	▲6.1pp	▲6.3pp
	Third party	Fourth party
Party	Plaid Cymru	Conservative
Seats won	2	1
Seat change	▼2	▼12
Popular vote	2,714	11,929
Percentage	3.5%	15.2%
Swing	▼2.0pp	▼7.7pp

The 2022 Bridgend County Borough Council election took place on 5 May 2022 as part of the 2022 Welsh local elections. Fifty one councillors were elected to Bridgend County Borough Council.

Welsh Labour gained the council from no overall control.

== Ward boundary changes ==
A local government boundary review of electoral wards took place prior to the election, by the Local Democracy and Boundary Commission for Wales. The recommendations were accepted by the Welsh Government in July 2021. For Bridgend County Borough, the number of wards were to be reduced, from 39 to 28. The number of councillors was to drop from 54 to 51. These changes were to take effect from the 2022 council election.

== Results ==
Labour regained a majority of seats at this election and therefore regained control of the council. The independents also gained seats, while the Conservatives lost 10 of their 11 seats.

2022 Bridgend County Borough Council election
Party	Seats	Gains	Losses	Net gain/loss	Seats %	Votes %	Votes	+/−
Labour	27	4	4	▲10	52.9	44.7	35,134	+6.1
Independent	21	6	3	▲6	41.2	35.6	28,012	+6.3
Plaid Cymru	2	0	0	▼2	3.9	3.5	2,714	-2.0
Conservative	1	0	3	▼12	2.0	15.2	11,929	-7.7
Liberal Democrats	0	0	1	▼2	0.0	0.9	723	-2.1
Green	0	0	0	0	0.0	0.1	85	-0.5

== Ward results ==
=== Aberkenfig ===
Aberkenfig
Party	Candidate	Votes	%	±%
Plaid Cymru	Ellie Richards	426	53.6	
Labour	Mary Webber	230	28.9	
Independent	Sara Thomas	139	17.5	
Majority		196	24.7	
Turnout		797	41.7	
Plaid Cymru hold		Swing		

=== Blackmill ===
Blackmill
Party	Candidate	Votes	%	±%
Labour	Hywel Williams	322	55.0	
Independent	Andy McKay	198	33.8	
Conservative	Vanessa Latchem-Smith	65	11.1	
Majority		124	21.2	
Turnout		588	31.6	
Labour hold		Swing		

=== Brackla East and Coychurch Lower ===
Brackla East and Coychurch Lower
Party	Candidate	Votes	%
Labour	Eugene Caparros	492	38.4
Labour	Simon Griffiths	460	35.9
Conservative	Rebekah Fudge	460	35.9
Conservative	Kay Rowlands	429	33.5
Independent	Cheryl Pickering	249	19.5
Independent	Philip Pickering	220	17.2
Plaid Cymru	Yasmin Zahra	79	6.2
Turnout		1,280	38.2
Labour win (new seat)			
Labour win (new seat)			

After several recounts the second and third placed candidates were still tied on 460 votes each. The second place was decided by a blind vote, with the Returning Officer picking one of two envelopes containing the two names.

=== Brackla East Central ===
Brackla East Central
Party	Candidate	Votes	%
Labour	William Kendall	223	36.4
Conservative	Tyler Walsh	186	30.3
Independent	Mark Payn	177	28.9
Plaid Cymru	Philippa Richards	27	4.4
Majority		37	6.1
Turnout		617	34.8
Labour win (new seat)			

=== Brackla West Central ===
Brackla West Central
Party	Candidate	Votes	%
Labour	John Spanswick	410	47.1
Conservative	Keith Hughes	285	32.7
Independent	Fran Sullivan	176	20.2
Majority		125	14.4
Turnout		879	33.8
Labour win (new seat)			

=== Brackla West ===
Brackla West
Party	Candidate	Votes	%
Labour	Johanna Llewellyn-Hopkins	218	38.6
Independent	Lisa Lewis	181	32.0
Conservative	Aniel Pucella	166	29.4
Majority		37	6.6
Turnout		573	29.2
Labour win (new seat)			

=== Bridgend Central ===
Bridgend Central
Party	Candidate	Votes	%
Independent	Tim Wood	1,159	45.0
Labour	Stuart Baldwin	1,112	43.2
Independent	Steven Bletsoe	1,072	41.6
Independent	Steven Easterbrook	1,048	40.7
Labour	Cari Evans	1,043	40.5
Labour	David White	980	38.0
Conservative	Thomas Dwyer	324	12.6
Conservative	Alex Hughes-Howells	310	12.0
Conservative	Marco Pucella	297	11.5
Turnout		2,577	33.1
Independent win (new seat)			
Labour win (new seat)			
Independent win (new seat)			

Note: Stuart Baldwin resigned shortly after being elected and a by-election was held on 11 August 2022.

=== Bryntirion, Laleston and Merthyr Mawr ===
Bryntirion, Laleston and Merthyr Mawr
Party	Candidate	Votes	%	±%
Independent	Ian Spiller	1,152	43.1	
Independent	Tony Berrow	1,018	38.1	
Labour	Colin Davies	853	31.9	
Labour	Joanne Cook	837	31.3	
Labour	Stephen Sloan	820	30.7	
Conservative	Nathan Adams	498	18.6	
Conservative	Samantha Chohan	459	17.2	
Liberal Democrats	Cheryl Green	447	16.7	
Conservative	Betty Kettley	345	12.9	
Liberal Democrats	Briony Davies	276	10.3	
Plaid Cymru	Stephen Lake	260	9.7	
Turnout		2,671	38.8	
Independent gain from Liberal Democrats				
Independent gain from Labour				
Labour win (new seat)				

=== Caerau ===
Caerau
Party	Candidate	Votes	%	±%
Independent	Chris Davies	926	53.8	
Labour	Paul Davies	785	45.6	
Labour	Robert Lewis	598	34.7	
Independent	Matthew Rowlands	299	17.4	
Plaid Cymru	Kyle Duggan	196	11.4	
Conservative	Mike Day	45	2.6	
Conservative	Lee Williams	41	2.4	
Turnout		1,721	34.5	
Independent hold				
Labour hold				

=== Cefn Glas ===
Cefn Glas
Party	Candidate	Votes	%	±%
Independent	Dave Harrison	618	51.8	
Labour	Jon-Paul Blundell	533	44.7	
Labour	Charles Smith	491	41.2	
Conservative	Gillian Bird	167	14.0	
Conservative	Joshua Chohan	122	10.2	
Turnout		1,192	36.3	
Independent gain from Labour				
Labour win (new seat)				

=== Coity Higher ===
Coity Higher
Party	Candidate	Votes	%
Independent	Amanda Williams	1,389	51.5
Independent	Martin Williams	1,152	42.7
Independent	Alan Wathan	995	36.9
Labour	Jamie Henderson	981	36.3
Labour	Zoe Blundell	933	34.6
Labour	Robbie Thomas	829	30.7
Conservative	Claire Lewis	462	17.1
Conservative	Samuel Ofunwa	392	14.5
Conservative	Melissa Humphreys	371	13.7
Turnout		2,699	36.8
Independent win (new seat)			
Independent win (new seat)			
Independent win (new seat)			

=== Cornelly ===
Cornelly
Party	Candidate	Votes	%	±%
Labour	Richard Granville	841	48.4	
Independent	Jeff Tildesley	809	46.5	
Labour	Elaine Winstanley	737	42.4	
Labour	Anthony Kavanagh	736	42.3	
Independent	Dorian Morgan	665	38.3	
Conservative	David Deere	242	13.9	
Conservative	Craig Morgan	213	12.3	
Conservative	Nick Kempley	152	8.7	
Turnout		1,738	31.6	
Labour hold				
Independent hold				
Labour win (new seat)				

=== Garw Valley ===
Garw Valley
Party	Candidate	Votes	%
Labour	Maxine Lewis	1,002	63.4
Labour	Heather Griffiths	983	62.2
Labour	Martyn Jones	903	57.2
Independent	John Coles	575	36.4
Conservative	Ben Lewis	196	12.4
Conservative	William Esmond	172	10.9
Conservative	Melanie Voisey	165	10.4
Turnout		1,580	27.7
Labour win (new seat)			
Labour win (new seat)			
Labour win (new seat)			

=== Llangynwyd ===
Llangynwyd
Party	Candidate	Votes	%	±%
Plaid Cymru	Malcolm James	453	51.1	
Labour	Harry Davies	374	42.2	
Green	Paul John	60	6.8	
Majority		79	8.9	
Turnout		905	39.1	
Plaid Cymru hold		Swing		

=== Maesteg East ===
Maesteg East
Party	Candidate	Votes	%	±%
Labour	Martin Hughes	716	51.8	
Independent	Phil Jenkins	561	40.6	
Labour	Fadhel Abedalkarim	560	40.5	
Independent	Tom Beedle	485	35.1	
Plaid Cymru	Kirsty Rice-Duggan	181	13.1	
Conservative	Simon Care	48	3.5	
Conservative	Joshua Nuth	42	3.0	
Turnout		1,383	37.1	
Labour gain from Independent				
Independent hold				

=== Maesteg West ===
Maesteg West
Party	Candidate	Votes	%	±%
Independent	Ross Thomas	1,732	84.6	
Labour	Richard Collins	713	34.8	
Labour	Rose Martin	434	21.2	
Plaid Cymru	Benjamin Southgate	268	13.1	
Conservative	Mary Emment-Lewis	46	2.2	
Conservative	Bobby Lewis	31	1.5	
Turnout		2,047	46.8	
Independent hold				
Labour hold				

=== Nant-y-moel ===
Nant-y-moel
Party	Candidate	Votes	%	±%
Labour Co-op	Rhys Goode	419	83.1	
Conservative	Shaun Jones	85	16.9	
Majority		334	66.2	
Turnout		522	29.2	
Labour Co-op gain from Independent		Swing		

=== Newton ===
Newton
Party	Candidate	Votes	%	±%
Conservative	Jonathan Pratt	424	43.7	
Labour	Elen Jones	302	31.1	
Independent	Mario Jones	245	25.2	
Majority		122	12.6	
Turnout		983	46.9	
Conservative hold		Swing		

=== Nottage ===
Nottage
Party	Candidate	Votes	%	±%
Independent	Norah Clarke	288	26.4	
Conservative	Robert Lee	268	24.6	
Independent	Jamie Strong	225	20.7	
Labour	Jeannie Monks	217	19.9	
Independent	Mark Chegwen	91	8.4	
Majority		20	1.8	
Turnout		1,102	44.6	
Independent hold		Swing		

=== Ogmore Vale ===
Ogmore Vale
Party	Candidate	Votes	%	±%
Independent	Della Hughes	440	46.8	
Labour	Dhanisha Patel	345	36.7	
Independent	Jeffrey Lake	63	6.7	
Plaid Cymru	Christine Moore	46	4.9	
Conservative	Jessica Martin	37	3.9	
Green	Laura Phillips	9	1.0	
Majority		95	10.1	
Turnout		943	39.6	
Independent gain from Labour		Swing		

=== Oldcastle ===
Oldcastle
Party	Candidate	Votes	%	±%
Independent	Ian Williams	741	48.7	
Independent	Freya Bletsoe	634	41.7	
Labour	Angela Morelli	574	37.7	
Labour	Martin Smidman	486	32.0	
Conservative	Matthew Voisey	277	18.2	
Conservative	Paul Chohan	235	15.5	
Turnout		1,521	39.3	
Independent gain from Conservative				
Independent gain from Conservative				

=== Pencoed and Penprysg ===
Pencoed and Penprysg
Party	Candidate	Votes	%
Independent	Alex Williams	2,139	68.4
Labour	Melanie Evans	1,108	35.5
Labour	Richard Williams	949	30.4
Labour	Barry Doughty	850	27.2
Conservative	John Butcher	706	22.6
Plaid Cymru	Leanne Lewis	638	20.4
Conservative	Ian Williams	499	16.0
Turnout		3,125	39.7
Independent win (new seat)			
Labour win (new seat)			
Labour win (new seat)			

=== Pen-y-fai ===
Pen-y-fai
Party	Candidate	Votes	%	±%
Labour Co-op	Heidi Bennett	434	50.4	
Conservative	Corey Edwards	183	21.3	
Plaid Cymru	Iolo Caudy	140	16.3	
Independent	Neil Hoskins	88	10.2	
Green	Justine Jenkins	16	1.9	
Majority		251	29.1	
Turnout		871	47.6	
Labour Co-op gain from Conservative		Swing		

=== Porthcawl East Central ===
Porthcawl East Central
Party	Candidate	Votes	%	±%
Labour	Neelo Farr	586	40.3	
Labour	Graham Walter	552	38.0	
Independent	Steve Maitland Thomas	454	31.2	
Independent	Brian Jones	401	27.6	
Conservative	Byron Davies	258	17.8	
Conservative	Carolyn Perren	226	15.6	
Independent	Julia Jones	172	11.8	
Turnout		1,453	33.7	
Labour gain from Independent				
Labour win (new seat)				

=== Porthcawl West Central ===
Porthcawl West Central
Party	Candidate	Votes	%	±%
Independent	Sean Aspey	451	53.6	
Labour	Chloe Rees	200	23.8	
Conservative	Richard Hughes	118	14.0	
Independent	Lorrie Desmond-Williams	73	8.7	
Majority		251	29.8	
Turnout		845	37.4	
Independent hold		Swing		

=== Pyle, Kenfig Hill and Cefn Cribwr ===
Pyle, Kenfig Hill and Cefn Cribwr
Party	Candidate	Votes	%
Labour	Huw David	1,452	72.5
Labour	Mike Kearn	1,308	65.3
Labour	Jane Gebbie	1,181	59.0
Independent	Rhys Watkins	445	22.2
Conservative	Louise Barham	367	18.3
Conservative	Ryan Lewis	230	11.5
Independent	David Unwin	202	10.1
Conservative	Charlotte Harries	200	10.0
Turnout		2,003	30.0
Labour win (new seat)			
Labour win (new seat)			
Labour win (new seat)			

=== Rest Bay ===
Rest Bay
Party	Candidate	Votes	%	±%
Independent	Robert Smith	530	54.0	
Conservative	Jeff Perren	452	46.0	
Majority		78	8.0	
Turnout		993	44.9	
Independent hold		Swing		

=== St. Bride's Minor and Ynysawdre ===
St. Bride's Minor and Ynysawdre
Party	Candidate	Votes	%
Independent	Tim Thomas	1,356	53.1
Labour	Paula Ford	1,100	43.1
Independent	Mark John	1,007	39.4
Labour	Mark Galvin	974	38.1
Independent	Leanne Teahan-Dyer	972	38.1
Labour	Gary Thomas	948	37.1
Conservative	Michael Crackett	215	8.4
Conservative	Linda Edger	215	8.4
Conservative	Carley Winter	203	7.9
Turnout		2,554	33.3
Independent win (new seat)			
Labour win (new seat)			
Independent win (new seat)			

== Changes 2022-2027 ==
=== By-elections ===
==== Bridgend Central ====
Held on 11 August 2022 following the resignation of Stuart Baldwin (Labour)

Bridgend Central
Party	Candidate	Votes	%	±%
Independent	Steven Easterbrook	716	46.8	
Labour	Ceri Evans	590	38.6	
Conservative	Thomas Dwyer	150	9.8	
Green	Paul John	40	2.6	
Liberal Democrats	Ben Curran	34	2.2	
Majority		126		
Turnout		1,530		
Independent gain from Labour				

==== Aberkenfig ====
Held on 7th March 2024 following the resignation of Ellie Richards (Plaid Cymru).

Aberkenfig
Party	Candidate	Votes	%	±%
Labour	Gary Haines	291	55.2	+27.7
Independent	Luke Richards	236	44.8	
Majority		55	10.4	
Turnout		527	27.0	
Labour gain from Plaid Cymru				

==== Pyle, Kenfig Hill and Cefn Cribwr ====
Held on 1 May 2025 following resignation of Mike Kearns (Labour).

Pyle, Kenfig Hill and Cefn Cribwr
Party	Candidate	Votes	%	±%
Reform	Owain Clatworthy	697	35.2	N/A
Labour	Gary Chappell	667	33.7	−30.4
Independent	Rhys Watkins	351	17.7	−2.0
Plaid Cymru	Andy Moss	154	7.4	N/A
Conservative	Byron John Davies	55	2.8	−13.4
Green	Debra Ann Cooper	54	2.7	N/A
Majority				
Turnout			29	
Registered electors				
Reform gain from Labour				

=== Changes of allegiance ===
- March / April 2026: Owen Clatworthy, elected for Reform UK, left the party in March 2026 and joined Restore Britain the following month.
- June 2026: Graham Walter, elected for Labour, left the party to sit as an independent. This defection reduced Labour to 25 seats, causing them to lose their overall majority on the council.
