= Maesteg East =

Electoral division in Bridgend, Wales

Maesteg East (Welsh: Maesteg Dwyrain) is an electoral ward in Bridgend County Borough, Wales. It covers part of the town of Maesteg. The ward elects two councillors to Bridgend County Borough Council.

According to the 2011 UK Census, the population of the Maesteg East ward was 4,773.

== District and county councils ==
=== Ogwr Borough Council ===
Maesteg East was a ward to Ogwr Borough Council from 1973 until 1996, represented by three borough councillors from 1973, reducing to two councillors from 1987.

=== Mid Glamorgan County Council ===
Maesteg East was created as a ward to Mid Glamorgan County Council, by The County of Mid Glamorgan (Electoral Arrangements) Order 1988, taking effect from the 1989 elections (and preparatory activity beforehand). It elected one county councillor, Labour's Jeff Jones, at the 1989 and 1993 elections.

=== Bridgend County Borough Council ===
Maesteg East subsequently became an electoral ward to Bridgend County Borough Council, following the creation of the new unitary authority in 1995. The ward is represented by two county borough councillors. Maesteg East councillor Jeff Jones became leader of the new authority, though was deselected by the local Labour Party in 1999, later overturning this on appeal. Seats have been won by the Labour Party and various candidates standing as Independents.

== Maesteg Town Council ==
Maesteg East is one of the four community wards to Maesteg Town Council, represented by five town councillors.

== Election results ==
* retiring councillor in the ward standing for re-election

=== 2022 Bridgend CBC ===
A couple of recounts were required to decide the result, meaning Maesteg East was the last ward in Bridgend County Borough to declare its results.

Bridgend County Borough Council election, 5 May 2022
Party	Candidate	Votes	%	±%
Labour	Martin Hughes	716	51.8	
Independent	Phil Jenkins	561	40.6	
Labour	Fadhel Abedalkarim	560	40.5	
Independent	Tom Beedle *	485	35.1	
Plaid Cymru	Kirsty Rice-Duggan	181	13.1	
Conservative	Simon Care	48	3.5	
Conservative	Joshua Nuth	42	3.0	
Turnout		1,383	37.1	
Labour gain from Independent				
Independent hold				

=== 2008 Bridgend CBC ===
Bill May had won a seat for Labour in 2004, after councillor Jeff Jones had stood down. However, while serving as mayor of Maesteg in 2006, May was deselected by the Labour Party in favour of Keith Edwards as the 2008 candidate.

Bridgend County Borough Council election, 1 May 2008
Party	Candidate	Votes	%	±%
Labour	David Keith Edwards	1,025	63.3	
Labour	Mal Reeves	974		
Independent	Bill Evans *	594	36.7	
Turnout		1,383	37.1	
Labour gain from Independent				
Labour hold				

== See also ==
- List of electoral wards in Bridgend County Borough
- List of electoral wards in Wales
