= Bryntirion, Laleston and Merthyr Mawr =

Electoral division in Bridgend County Borough, Wales

Bryntirion, Laleston & Merthyr Mawr is one of the larger electoral wards of Bridgend County Borough, Wales. It covers the community of Merthyr Mawr and most of the neighbouring community of Laleston, which includes the village of the same name and the Bridgend suburb of Bryntirion. The ward elects two county councillors to the Bridgend County Borough Council.

The ward was created by The County Borough of Bridgend (Electoral Arrangements) Order 1998 effective for the preparation for the May 1999 council elections.

According to the 2011 census the population of the ward was 8,713.

== County councillors ==
Recent elections have been competitive between the different political parties.

2017 Bridgend County Borough Council election
Party	Candidate	Votes	%	±%
Liberal Democrats	Cheryl Anne Green	810		
Labour	Pamela Annette Davies	719		
Conservative	Gordon Lewis	700		
Liberal Democrats	Ian Matthew Spiller	664		
Labour	Ian Griffiths	650		
Conservative	Wayne Buffett Warlow	642		
Green	Kathy Lewis	194		

2012 Bridgend County Borough Council election
Party	Candidate	Votes	%	±%
Labour	Pamela Davies	700	32.9	
Liberal Democrats	Cheryl Green	624	29.4	
Labour	A. Breading	558		
Conservative	I. Spiller	531	25.0	
Liberal Democrats	W. Morgan	529		
Green	Kathy Lewis	271	12.7	

== See also ==
- List of electoral wards in Bridgend County Borough
