= Caerau (Bridgend electoral ward) =

Electoral division in Maesteg, Wales

Caerau is an electoral ward in Bridgend County Borough, Wales. It covers part of the town of Maesteg. The ward elects two councillors to Bridgend County Borough Council.

The ward covers the northern part of Maesteg, including the former mining village of Caerau, as well as the area of Nantyffyllon. According to the 2011 UK Census, the population of the Caerau ward was 6,995.

== District and county councils ==
=== Ogwr Borough Council ===
Caerau was a ward to Ogwr Borough Council from 1987 until 1996, represented by two borough councillors elected at the 1987 and 1991 elections.

=== Mid Glamorgan County Council ===
Caerau was created as a ward to Mid Glamorgan County Council, by The County of Mid Glamorgan (Electoral Arrangements) Order 1988, taking effect from the 1989 elections. It elected one county councillor at the 1989 and 1993 elections.

=== Bridgend County Borough Council ===
Caerau subsequently became an electoral ward to Bridgend County Borough Council, following the creation of the new unitary authority in 1995. Two councillors were elected in 1995, this increased to three councillors from the 1999 local elections. Following a 2019 local government boundary review, the number of councillors was reduced to two, effective from the 2022 local elections.

== Maesteg Town Council ==
Caerau (covering only the northern area of the town around Caerau village) is one of the four community wards to Maesteg Town Council, represented by four town councillors.

== Election results ==
* retiring councillor in the ward standing for re-election

=== 2022 Bridgend CBC ===
With the number of available seats reducing by one, sitting Labour councillor, Gareth Howells, did not stand for re-election. Independent Chris Davies was standing again, after winning a seat at the 2021 by-election. Eyes were on the Caerau result because of the recent campaign by councillors about poor building improvements in the ward.

Bridgend CBC election, 5 May 2022
Party	Candidate	Votes	%	±%
Independent	Chris Davies *	926	47.4	
Labour	Paul Davies *	785	40.2	
Labour	Robert Lewis	598		
Independent	Matthew Rowlands	299		
Plaid Cymru	Kyle Duggan	196	10.0	
Conservative	Mike Day	45	2.3	
Conservative	Lee Williams	41		
Turnout				
Independent hold				
Labour hold				

=== 2021 Bridgend CBC by-election ===
Sitting Labour councillor, Phil White, died in October 2021 after contracting COVID-19 coronavirus. He had been a Caerau councillor since 2008 and a Cabinet Member for Communities on Bridgend Council. A by-election was called to replace him. Independent candidate Chris Davies won the by-election.

Caerau by-election, 16 December 2021
Party	Candidate	Votes	%	±%
Independent	Chris Davies	515	48.8	
Labour	Robert Lewis	441	41.8	
Plaid Cymru	Kyle Duggan	82	7.8	
Conservative	Thomas Dwyer	18	1.7	
Turnout				
Independent gain from Labour				

== See also ==
- List of electoral wards in Bridgend County Borough
- List of electoral wards in Wales
