= Newcastle Higher =

Newcastle Higher: Welsh: Y Castellnewydd
- Location within Bridgend
- Population: 4,416 (2021)
- OS grid reference: SS897801
- Community: Newcastle Higher
- Principal area: Bridgend
- Preserved county: Mid Glamorgan
- Country: Wales
- Sovereign state: United Kingdom
- Post town: BRIDGEND
- Postcode district: CF31
- Postcode district: CF32
- Dialling code: 01656
- Police: South Wales
- Fire: South Wales
- Ambulance: Welsh
- UK Parliament: Bridgend
- Senedd Cymru – Welsh Parliament: Bridgend
- List of places UK Wales Bridgend 51.535°N 3.597°W Map of the community

Newcastle Higher (Welsh: Y Castellnewydd) is a community in Bridgend County Borough, South Wales. Located north west of Bridgend town centre it is made up of the townships of Pen-y-fai and Aberkenfig and straddles the M4 motorway. The Pen-y-fai community is home to several notable buildings, including the Glanrhyd Hospital (the former Glamorganshire Lunatic Asylum), Court Colman Hotel, Smyrna Baptist Chapel and All Saints Church. Aberkenfig is home to the Len Evans Centre, Aberkenfig Welfare Hall and Aberkenfig Mosque to name but a few. Both communities have war memorials in honour of those local residents who served and lost their lives in WW1 and WW2.

At the 2001 census, the community's population was 3,695, increasing to 4,046 at the 2011 Census.

The population of Aberkenfig according to the 2021 Census was 2384. Latest government statistics can be found here.

Pen-y-fai population according to 2021 Census was 2032. Details can be found here.

== Governance ==
At the local level the community elects twelve community councillors to Newcastle Higher Community Council, 6 each from the community wards of Aberkenfig and Pen-y-fai. For Newcastle Higher Community Council website click here.

Newcastle Higher used to be the name of the county electoral ward, electing one county councillor at the 1995 elections to Bridgend County Borough Council. In 1999, Newcastle Higher Community Council remained in place, but the County Borough elections split Aberkenfig and Pen-y-fai into two separate wards with each area electing their own County Councillor.

Prior to 1996, Newcastle Higher was a ward (from 1987) to Ogwr Borough Council and, from 1989, to Mid Glamorgan County Council.
