= Oldcastle, Bridgend =

Area and electoral ward of Bridgend, Wales

Coordinates: 51.503°N 3.575°W

Oldcastle (Welsh: Hengastell) is an area and electoral ward of the town of Bridgend, Wales, to the south of the town centre. The ward elects councillors to Bridgend Town Council and Bridgend County Borough Council.

== Description ==
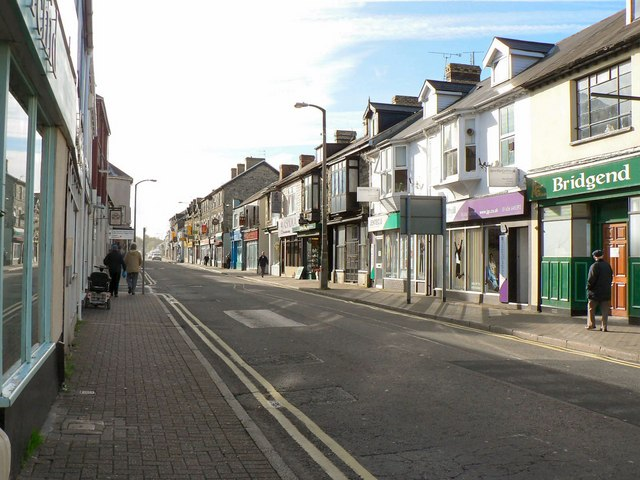
Nolton Street, Bridgend

Oldcastle is located immediately south of Bridgend town centre. The area is bordered to the west by the River Ogmore. Oldcastle originally spread along Nolton Street and Cowbridge Road (and was also known as Nolton).

The Oldcastle name is believed to refer to Nolton Castle (rather than the nearby Newcastle Castle), whose remains were recorded in the 16th-century on the southeast of a bend in the River Ogmore. With the 'new' castle dating from at least 1106, the 'old' castle is presumed to have been in existence before 1100 and would have been an earth and timber structure.

The modern area also includes the Bridgend campus of Bridgend College.

== Electoral ward ==
The Oldcastle electoral ward extends south to include the areas of Whiterock and Hernston. The ward is bounded by the River Ewenny (and the Vale of Glamorgan) to the south, The Rhiw, Brackla Street and Pen-y-Banc in the north, coterminous with the boundaries of Bridgend town to the east and west. According to the 2011 UK Census the population of the ward was 4,799 (with 3,930 aged 18 or over).

Oldcastle is one of three wards to Bridgend Town Council (with Morfa and Newcastle), electing up to six of the nineteen Bridgend town councillors.

Prior to 1996 Oldcastle was a ward to Ogwr Borough Council, electing two (Conservative) councillors.

Oldcastle is also a county ward to Bridgend County Borough Council, electing two county councillors. Since the 1995 elections the ward has generally been represented by the Labour Party, though had Liberal Democrat representation between 2004 and 2012. In February 2015 the Oldcastle (Labour) councillors were two of six councillors suspended from the council for voting against a merger proposal with the Vale of Glamorgan Council.
