= Laleston =

Laleston: Welsh: Trelales
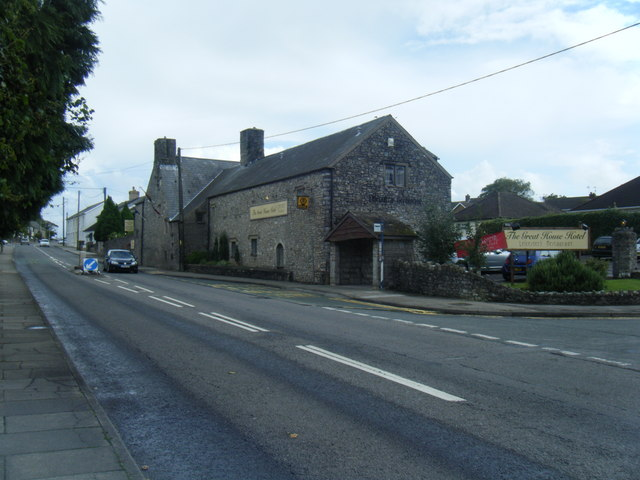
- Great House Hotel, Laleston

- Location within Bridgend
- Population: 12,586 (2011)
- OS grid reference: SS874796
- Community: Laleston
- Principal area: Bridgend
- Preserved county: Mid Glamorgan
- Country: Wales
- Sovereign state: United Kingdom
- Post town: BRIDGEND
- Postcode district: CF31
- Postcode district: CF32
- Dialling code: 01656
- Police: South Wales
- Fire: South Wales
- Ambulance: Welsh
- UK Parliament: Bridgend
- Senedd Cymru – Welsh Parliament: Bridgend
- List of places UK Wales Bridgend 51.504753°N 3.622590°W Map of the community

Laleston (Welsh: Trelales) is a village and a community in Bridgend County Borough, south Wales, directly west of Bridgend town centre. The village takes its name from the Norman Lageles family who settled in the area. Buildings of note in the village include St David's Church, which still possesses features dating back to the 13th and 14th centuries, the Great House which was built in the early 16th century and Horeb Welsh Presbyterian Church (1831).

As a community, Laleston includes the areas of Bryntirion, Cefn Glas, Tythegston and Broadlands. The boundaries of the community are almost entirely set by transport routes, with the western and north western border defined by the M4 motorway, where it then turns south-easterly at Stormy Down following the A48 back towards Bridgend town centre. It then takes in the Greenfields area, briefly following the banks of the River Ogmore, before heading north to Cefn Glas, but skirting Bridgend town centre and Newcastle. At the 2001 census, the community's population was 8,475, increasing to 12,586 at the 2011 Census, a 48.5% increase.

== Buildings of note ==
The village of Laleston has several buildings of features of note. Clustered around the church, the village has several cottages and one larger house still recognisable as 16th century design. The Great House (Grade II), now a hotel, has its origins set in the 16th century, though the southern half of the building is more likely an additional 17th century build.

St David's Church is located in the centre of the village. It shows 13th and 14th century designs, though much work has been carried out since its earliest period. The church is standard in plan with a west tower, nave and lower chancel, but the tower interior is in the Perpendicular Gothic style. A restoration of 1871 saw all the original windows replaced, and this work was completed by John Prichard, more famous for his restoration of Llandaff Cathedral. There are several rustic tablets in the church from c. 1700. The Church of St David is now a Grade I Listed building, while the churchyard cross is Grade II.

Also of note is Horeb Welsh Presbyterian Church (Grade II), of a long-wall facade style with two tall windows in the centre, flanked by two doors, unusual for the 1831 build. While the Laleston Inn (Grade II) on Wind Street is the only building in Glamorgan from this period designed with two serving areas on the lower level.

To the north of Laleston is the field of Cae'rheneglwys, where the remains of the church once dedicated to St Cewydd, who was the Welsh equivalent of St Swithin.

== Governance ==
At the local level, Laleston Community Council comprises 13 community councillors, with a Laleston/Bryntirion ward electing five of them.

Prior to April 1996 Laleston was the name of an electoral ward to Ogwr Borough Council, electing three councillors. It also elected a county councillor to Mid Glamorgan County Council. Subsequent to the creation of Bridgend County Borough, Laleston was covered by the Laleston/Merthyr Mawr ward then, from 1999, by the Bryntirion, Laleston and Merthyr Mawr ward. Two county councillors are elected to the county borough council.

== Notable residents (past and present) ==
- Huw Ceredig (Actor)
- J. J. Williams (Rugby player)
- Christian Williams (Jockey)
