= Aberkenfig =

Coordinates: 51.5395°N 03.5947°W

Aberkenfig: Welsh: Abercynffig
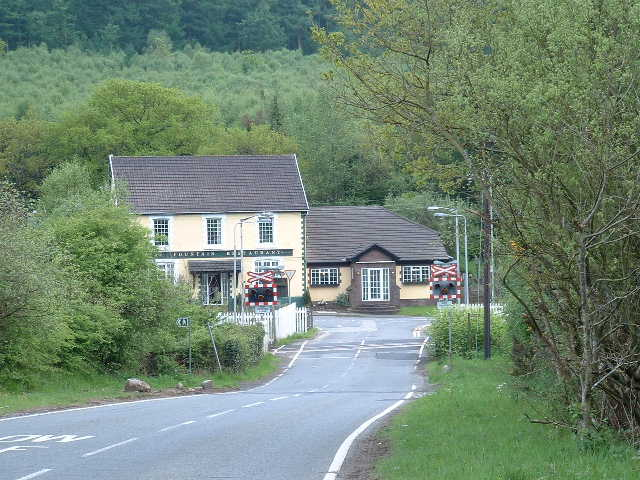

- Location within Bridgend
- OS grid reference: SS895845
- Principal area: Bridgend
- Preserved county: Mid Glamorgan
- Country: Wales
- Sovereign state: United Kingdom
- Post town: BRIDGEND
- Postcode district: CF32
- Dialling code: 01656
- Police: South Wales
- Fire: South Wales
- Ambulance: Welsh
- UK Parliament: Ogmore

Aberkenfig (Welsh: Abercynffig, meaning "mouth of the Kenfig" (stream)) is a village located in the County Borough of Bridgend, Wales to the north of Bridgend town. It is in the community of Newcastle Higher.

== Location ==
Aberkenfig is located in South Wales, just off the A4063 link to the M4 at Junction 36. It is nestled at the confluence of the River Llynfi and the Ogmore River. It is located to the south of Tondu and to the west of Sarn, Brynmenyn and Bryncethin. These five villages, which all lie to the north of the M4, whilst remaining distinctly separate areas have expanded to form one contiguous urban area of several thousand, which is primarily a dormitory suburb of Bridgend, although many people also work in Cardiff and Swansea due to the motorway's proximity. As a result of its location next to both rivers, it is somewhat lower in elevation compared to the other villages (especially Sarn) and this results in a microclimate which can produce some fog during the winter months.

== Governance ==
Aberkenfig is covered by an electoral ward in the same name, though the Aberkenfig ward also includes the neighbouring community of Llangynwyd Lower and the village of Coytrahen. At the 2011 census this ward had a population of 2,039. The ward elects one county borough councillor to Bridgend County Borough Council.

== Commercial activity ==
Compared to other villages around Bridgend county, and relative to its size, Aberkenfig has a large range of commercial activity. It also has a rather diverse commercial sector, with it being home to a licensed sex shop, which is opposite a gun and fishing tackle shop. There are a number of hairdressers in the village, along with two corner shops, one taxi firm, two furniture shops, a proper old fashioned hardware store run by a family that has been trading in the village since the 1870s. A betting shop and a number of fast food outlets – which are mainly Cantonese, or fish and chip shops. The village is also home to the New Garden, a highly regarded Chinese restaurant which has been featured in the Egon Ronay Guide.

At the centre of the village is a small green patch of grass and a bench at the junction of Bridgend Road, Pandy Road and Dunraven Street, and is accompanied by a CCTV camera, placed as a response by the council to growing concerns about the activities of young people in the village. The focus of commercial activity is around this centre, although it has moved here from further up Bridgend Road closer to Tondu, although some shops have remained there, and some new shops have opened in recent years. It also contains the Court Colman Hotel.

Court Colman Golf Club (now defunct) first appeared following WW1. It continued into the 1930s.

== Religious establishments ==
In spite of this area of South Wales following the rest of the United Kingdom in increasing secularisation throughout the 20th and 21st centuries, there are a number of religious houses of worship in the village. The village's central and accessible location at the confluence of the two rivers (and the Garw river flows into the Ogmore near Brynmenyn) and three valleys (Llynfi, Ogmore and Garw) have historically dictated the development of religious houses of worship (and also benefits commercial development here, rather than any other of the five villages). There is a Roman Catholic church, testament to both Irish immigration and the presence of Welsh Italians, and this is also reflected in people's surnames around the area. This is the only Catholic church between Bridgend and Maesteg and is also frequented by people who live in the Ogmore and Garw valleys. There is a Church in Wales parish church, and there are several smaller Non-conformist chapels dotted around the village. Both the Catholic and Anglican churches lack their own priests and are served by other parishes. The former Catholic Church recreational hall in Dunraven Street was sold off, bought and turned into a mosque run by the Glamorgan Muslim Community Association. This area has been, and still is (according to the 2001 Census) almost uniformly visibly white, with the next largest ethnic group being Chinese (about 0.2%) Also, bucking the national trend for churches to be shut and used for other purposes, the former Lyric Bingo Hall on Pandy Road was turned into a charismatic evangelical church, the Aberkenfig Bible Church.

== Education and amenities ==
Aberkenfig has a Roman Catholic Primary school, St. Robert's, in Dan y Lan, which is in the south of the village. It also has a state primary school, Tondu Primary School—which was originally located in Tondu, but was knocked down and rebuilt in Meadow Street, retaining the name—which is in the north of the village, and Pandy Infant School, which is just off Heol Persondy.

Most comprehensive school children go either to Ynysawdre Comprehensive School, which is located in nearby Tondu, or to the Catholic comprehensive school, Archbishop McGrath Comprehensive School, which was also in Tondu, but is now in Brackla. Aberkenfig also has a bowling green, and a communal space, the Aberkenfig Welfare Hall. Aberkenfig also has a telephone exchange.

== Transport ==
The centre of Aberkenfig is a lot quieter than it used to be after a new road, (now the B4281 Park Road) was built, to bypass the centre of Aberkenfig and cut traffic off Dunraven Street, which is very narrow. Another bypass (the A4063) was built to bypass Bridgend Road to take valleys traffic for to Bridgend out of the village. This second bypass cut Heol Persondy in two, which was the road from Aberkenfig to Sarn, and reduced it to a footpath. Whilst this did affect commercial activity, the road infrastructure in the village would now not be able to cope with the amount of traffic that the bypass now takes.

It is not served by the Maesteg Line although both Tondu railway station (around 10 minutes walk away from the village centre) and the closer Sarn railway station (about seven minutes walk away) via Heol Persondy are on the line.

It is also served by First Cymru Bus service 32 and 36 to Maesteg (via the A4063) and to Bridgend (via the A4063 link and the A4061), which also links Aberkenfig to the McArthur Glen Designer Outlet Wales and Sainsbury's supermarket at the motorway junction. It is also served by service 30, which although going between Maesteg and Bridgend bus station and goes via Pen-y-fai and the A4063 towards Bridgend. Also it is served by service 63, which goes between Bridgend (following the route of the 32 and 36 services but then goes as far as Porthcawl via Kenfig Hill and Pyle. Service 30, 32 and 36 stop in the centre of the village, but Service 63 stops only on Park Road.

== Notable people ==
- Gwyn Davies (rugby) Dual code rugby international for Wales
- Pam Ferris actress

== Sports and leisure ==
Aberkenfig is home to the rugby union club Tondu RFC, a member of the Welsh Rugby Union. Aberkenfig is also the home to the Bridgend and district football team Aberkenfig Conservative Football Club, (Aber Cons). Aberkenfig Boys and Girls have football teams that start with under 7's all the way to 16's as well as offering training for girls 6 years and over.
