= Rest Bay (electoral ward) =

Coordinates: 51.486°N 3.718°W

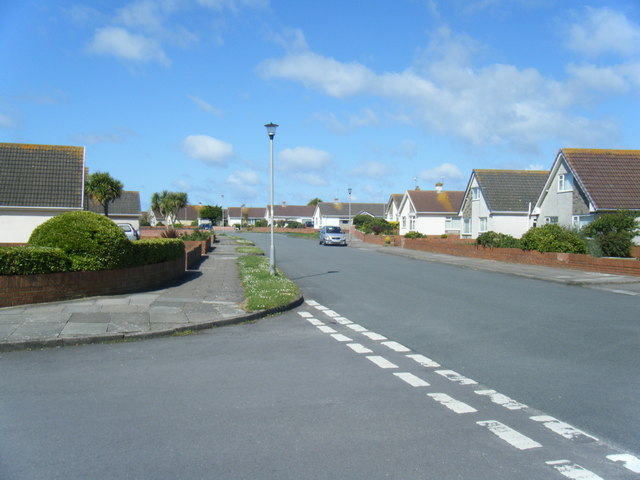
Sandpiper Road, Rest Bay

Rest Bay is an electoral ward in the town of Porthcawl in Bridgend County Borough, Wales. It is on the coast overlooking bay and beach of the same name.

The ward covers the residential area northwest of Porthcawl town centre, bordered to the south by Severn Road (and the Porthcawl West Central ward) and partially to the east by West Park Drive (and the Nottage ward). Most of the northern part of the Rest Bay ward includes the course of the Royal Porthcawl Golf Club.

Rest Bay is a ward to Porthcawl Town Council, electing three of the nineteen town councillors.

The Rest Bay county electoral ward was created by The County Borough of Bridgend (Electoral Arrangements) Order 1998 and is represented by one county councillor on Bridgend County Borough Council. Liberal Democrat councillor Gerald Davies was the representative throughout this time, until the May 2017 elections when the ward was won by Independent councillor, Mike Clarke. Davies did not stand at this election.

== See also ==
- List of electoral wards in Bridgend County Borough
