= Ogmore Vale =

Coordinates: 51.603028°N 3.546700°W

Ogmore Vale: Welsh: Cwm Ogwr
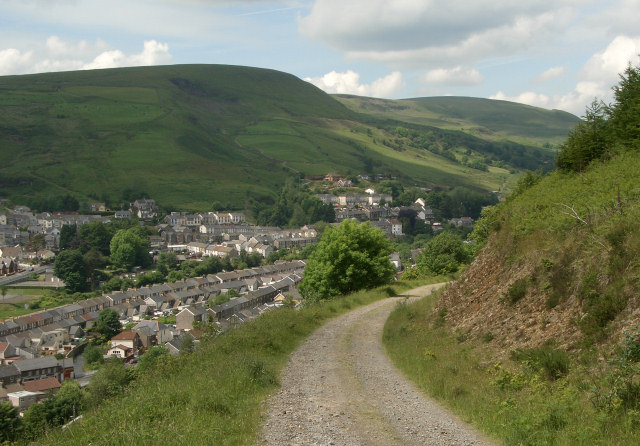

- Location within Bridgend
- Population: 3,117 (ward 2011)
- OS grid reference: SS929904
- Community: Ogmore Valley
- Principal area: Bridgend
- Preserved county: Mid Glamorgan
- Country: Wales
- Sovereign state: United Kingdom
- Post town: BRIDGEND
- Postcode district: CF32 7xx
- Dialling code: 01656
- Police: South Wales
- Fire: South Wales
- Ambulance: Welsh
- UK Parliament: Rhondda and Ogmore
- Senedd Cymru – Welsh Parliament: Bridgend

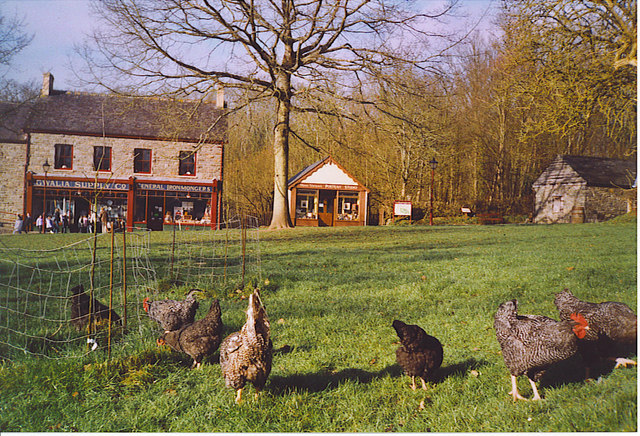
Gwalia Stores, built in 1880 was moved, and rebuilt in St Fagans National History Museum.

Ogmore Vale (Welsh: Cwm Ogwr) is a village (and electoral ward) in the county borough of Bridgend, Wales on the River Ogmore. Until the 1980's, the village's main source of income came from coal mining. Up until the year 1865, the Ogmore valley was a quiet, isolated, rural hill farming community of less than ten farms and a few cottages. Today, along with Nantymoel and Price Town it makes up the community of Ogmore Valley.

== History ==
In 1851 the total population of the valley was probably less than one hundred people. On the 1 August 1865 the Ogmore Valley Railway was opened by John Brogden and Sons for mineral, goods and passenger traffic from Porthcawl to Nantymoel. The completion of the railway connections with Bridgend through Tondu and Porthcawl Dock, enabled the development to begin of the vast reserves of high quality house coals and dry steam coals of the valley.

The No. 2 and No. 3 Rhondda house and bituminous coals which outcrop along the valley were quickly proved and the Aber, Caedu and Tynewydd collieries were opened by drift mining driven into the seams from the mountain sides. In the latter part of 1865, John Brogden and Sons commenced the sinking of the two shafts at the Wyndham Colliery to prove and work the high quality smokeless dry steam coals of the Lower Coal Measures.

Brogdens lost control, first through an unavoidable merger in 1872 with the Llynvi Coal and Iron Company Ltd to make the Llynvi, Tondu and Ogmore Coal and Iron Company, then by the 1878 liquidation of the merged company after a large debenture-holder demanded his money back. After some abortive attempts to revive the business, stability was restored by the establishment of North's Navigation Collieries (1889) Ltd.

From 1865 to 1983, when the last colliery (Wyndham/Western Mine) closed, the coal industry provided much employment for the communities of the valley. The area this once stood in is now known locally as the planker,

The village's Gwalia Stores, built in 1880 was moved, brick by brick, and rebuilt in St Fagans National History Museum.

The village has a rugby union club, prize winning brass band, a local history society, community centre, Wyndham Boys & Girls Club, ladies choir and a male voice choir.

There is one primary school, opened in September 2003, replacing four schools. They were, with opening dates in brackets; Tynewydd Junior (1875), (Tynewydd was first opened in 1865 as a company school for the Aber Colliery Company), Aber Infants (1873), (Aber was originally known as Craigrhiwglyn Board School and built privately by Mrs Ann Blandy-Jenkins in 1876 and later purchased by the Llandyfodwg School Board), Fronwen Primary (1914), Ogmore Vale Nursery (1947).

Of the former school sites, the original Craigrhwiglyn (Aber Boys), Fronwen and Tynewydd sites have all been developed for local housing. The former nursery in Park Avenue has been demolished but as yet the site is undeveloped. In 2016 Aber Infants (Built 1909) and Aber Girls (Built 1912) were both demolished with a Bat Dwelling built in the yard of the former infants school to house the Bat Population of the schools.

== Governance ==
At the local level, Ogmore Vale is an electoral ward to Ogmore Valley Community Council, electing up to four of the 14 community councillors.

Prior to April 1996 Ogmore Vale was a ward to Ogwr Borough Council, electing a Labour councillor in 1987 and 1991. Since 1995 Ogmore Vale has also been a ward to Bridgend County Borough Council, electing one county councillor. The ward has elected Labour, Plaid Cymru and Independent councillors.

The village lies in the parliamentary constituency of Rhondda and Ogmore.

== Notable residents ==
- Aneurin Barnard, actor
- Lynn Davies, long jump gold medal, 1964 Tokyo Olympics
- Windsor Davies, actor
- Dorothy Edwards (Welsh novelist) wrote the 1927 short story collection 'Rhapsody' and the 1928 novel 'Winter Sonata'. Edwards was born in Ogmore Vale in 1903 and died by suicide in 1934. Her parents both taught in Tynewydd school
- Grahame Hodgson, Wales rugby union international, played 15 times between 1961 and 1967
- William Ingram (writer/actor)
- Melbourne Thomas, Wales rugby union international. Played six times for Wales between 1919 and 1923

== Films, TV and books ==
- William Ingram who wrote the book 'The District Nurse' which was filmed between 1984 and 1987 starring Nerys Hughes lived in Gorwyl Road in Ogmore Vale until he died in early 2013. Several scenes from the programme were filmed in the village.
- A Run for Your Money (filmed at Nantymoel railway station) c.1948.
- Very Annie Mary a 2001 comedy film partly filmed in Ogmore.
