= Coity =

Coordinates: 51.521232°N 3.552489°W

Coity: Welsh: Coety
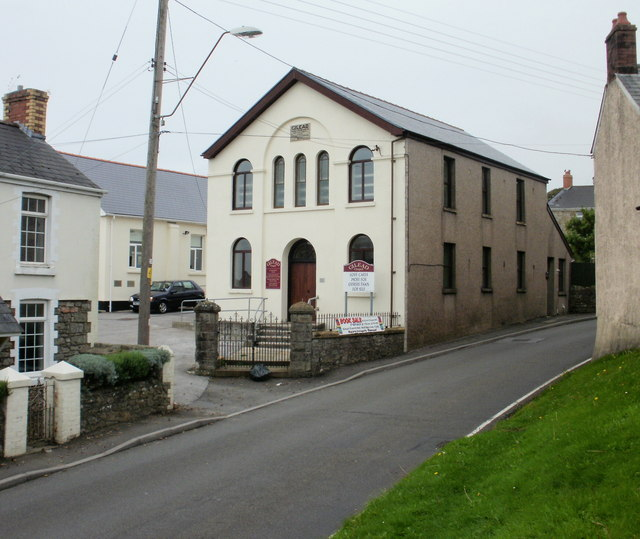

- Location within Bridgend
- Population: 2,071 (Ward 2011)
- OS grid reference: SS923814
- Community: Coity Higher
- Principal area: Bridgend
- Preserved county: Mid Glamorgan
- Country: Wales
- Sovereign state: United Kingdom
- Post town: BRIDGEND
- Postcode district: CF35 6xx
- Dialling code: 01656
- Police: South Wales
- Fire: South Wales
- Ambulance: Welsh
- UK Parliament: Bridgend
- Senedd Cymru – Welsh Parliament: Bridgend

Coity (Welsh: Coety) is a village in Bridgend County Borough, south Wales, part of Bridgend town urban area. Coity is part of the community of Coity Higher and is notable for being home to Coity Castle, one of the best-preserved castles in Glamorgan. Other buildings of note in the village include St Mary, a 14th-century church, and Ty Mawr, a fine 16th-century house.

== History ==
The oldest monument in Coity is a burial chamber near Coed Parc Garw woodland. It consists of a large megalith, tilted upwards and supported by other smaller stones.

The oldest remaining building in Coity is Coity Castle. Now ruinous, but according to John Newman, "(after Caerphilly) ... the most impressive ruined medieval castle in Glamorgan", Coity Castle was built c. 1100 by Payn Turberville. Turberville was one of the Twelve Knights of Glamorgan, and the construction of Coity Castle was part of Robert Fitzhamon's strategy to subjugate the region. The castle remained in the hands of the Tuberville family before passing to Sir Lawrence Berkerolles by 1380. In 1404 Sir Lawrence found himself under siege at Coity by the forces of Owain Glyndŵr, and again in 1405. A few years later ownership of the castle was successfully challenged by William Gamage through a court action. The castle remained in the Gamage family who lived at Coity, and in 1584 Barbara Gamage married Robert Sidney, who took ownership. Sidney did not live at the castle, but family members continued to live there until the 18th century. By the time the castle passed to the Earl of Dunraven in 1833, it was ruinous and was placed into state guardianship in 1929. The castle is listed as a Grade I building, as it is an example of medieval defensive architecture in Wales.

In the 14th century, a church was founded at Coity and dedicated to Saint Mary. The church also underwent 16th-century alterations and was again restored in 1860 by John Prichard and John Pollard Seddon. The church is listed as a Grade I building as it retains its 14th-century form and character due to 19th-century restorations. The church stands to this day and has several key important features, including an Easter Sepulchre (c. 1500). There is also a war memorial located outside St. Mary's Church, which commemorates the residents of Coity were either killed or missing during both the first sand second world wars the memorial contains 13 names from the first world war and 8 names from the second world war. Other places of worship included Gilead Welsh Independent Chapel, which saw rebuilding in 1890.

Another historical building in Coity is Tŷ Mawr. A late-16th-century building, with lower wings added in the 19th century. The building also underwent mid 20th-century alterations. It is a Grade II listed building due to it being a great example of 16th-century Glamorgan architecture.

Bridgend & Coity Golf Club (now defunct) first appeared in 1928. The club disappeared following WW2.

As of 2001, the community of Coity Higher had a population of just 835, which includes the larger village of Litchard. A large housing development, first proposed in the 1990s is seen by some residents of Coity as threatening the smaller village.

== Key statistics (c.2011) ==
All Residents:2,071
Number of households:296
Average household size:2.30
Residents in households:693
Residents in communal living:1,378
Area (hectares):503
Population density (people per hectare):4.10

== Governance ==
At the local level, Coity is a ward electing community councillors to Coity Higher Community Council. Because of the tenfold increase in number of houses in Coity, the size of the community council increased from May 2022, with Coity's representation increasing from two, to six councillors.

Between 1999 and 2022 Coity was the name of an electoral ward to Bridgend County Borough Council, covering Coity, electing one county councillor. Councillor Ella Dodd, elected as a Labour councillor in 1995, represented the ward as an independent since 2004.
