= Coity Higher =

Coity Higher: Welsh: Coety Uchaf
- Location within Bridgend
- Population: 6,078 (2011)
- OS grid reference: SS923814
- Community: Coity Higher
- Principal area: Bridgend
- Preserved county: Mid Glamorgan
- Country: Wales
- Sovereign state: United Kingdom
- Post town: BRIDGEND
- Postcode district: CF31
- Postcode district: CF35
- Dialling code: 01656
- Police: South Wales
- Fire: South Wales
- Ambulance: Welsh
- UK Parliament: Bridgend
- Senedd Cymru – Welsh Parliament: Bridgend
- List of places UK Wales Bridgend 51.521232°N 3.552489°W Map of the community

Coity Higher (Welsh: Coety Uchaf) is a community in Bridgend County Borough, south Wales. It contains the north western suburbs of Bridgend which includes the villages of Litchard and Coity. The southern boundary of the community adjoins the community of Brackla, while the northern border is defined by the M4 motorway. Notable buildings and landmarks within the community include Coity Castle, Parc Prison, the 14th century Church of St Mary, Pendre Hospital, Ty Mawr House and a burial chamber. At the 2001 census, the community's population was 835, being re-measured at 6,078 t the 2011 Census.

== Scheduled Monuments ==
There are six Scheduled Monuments in the Coity Higher Community:-

Coity Burial Chamber
A Chambered tomb, (Location: 51.5262°N 3.5482°W SS926819.) The ruins of a Neolithic chambered tomb, with four large stone slabs.
Pant-y-Pyllau Enclosure
A Prehistoric Earthwork. (Location: 51.5306°N 3.5478°W SS927824). A banked enclosure with external ditches. Parts have been destroyed by farm buildings and tracks.
Coity Castle
A property in the care of Cadw (Location: 51.5221°N 3.5534°W, SS923814). A circular castle with 3-storey keep. It had fallen into ruin by the 18th century.
Derwen Moated Site
(Location: 51.5304°N 3.5666°W SS914824). A medieval moat, possibly in the former parkland of Coity Castle, with no visible trace of habitation.
Angleton Iron Works
An Industrial monument (Location: 51.5263°N 3.5809°W SS904820). Built by Robert Sydney in 1589, it was the only pre-1700 ironworks in Glamorgan. Sandstone slabs are the standing remains, part buried by the railway embankment.
Cefn Hirgoed Rabbit Warren
(Location: 51.534°N 3.5642°W, SS916828), On the boundary with St Bride's Minor community, the three pillow mounds are from a medieval warren built to house rabbits. They are now alongside the M4, near Sarn Park Services.

== Governance ==
Coity Higher was an electoral ward to Ogwr Borough Council from 1973 until 1996, electing two councillors. At the 1995 elections to the new Bridgend County Borough Council it elected two Labour councillors.

Since 1999 the community has been divided into three wards, Coity, Litchard and Pendre, which each elect one councillor. Since the 2017 elections Coity has been represented by independent councillor Amanda Williams, Litchard by Conservative Sadie Vidal and Pendre by Labour councillor Richard Young.

From the local elections in May 2022 Coity Higher once again became a BCBC ward, coterminous with the Coity Higher community, represented by 3 councillors.

Coity Higher is also represented by Coity Higher Community Council. The community council has 11 members representing the three wards of Coity, Litchard and Pendre.
