= Cefn Cribwr =

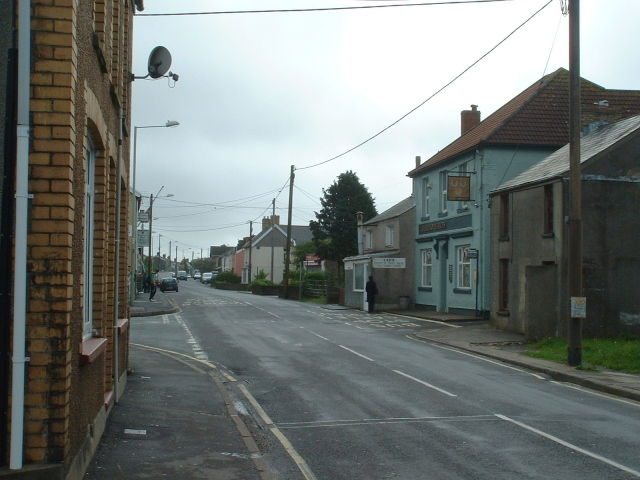

- Location within Bridgend
- Population: 1,481
- Principal area: Bridgend
- Preserved county: Mid Glamorgan
- Country: Wales
- Sovereign state: United Kingdom
- Post town: Bridgend
- Postcode district: CF32 0
- Dialling code: 01656
- Police: South Wales
- Fire: South Wales
- Ambulance: Welsh
- UK Parliament: Bridgend
- Senedd Cymru – Welsh Parliament: Ogmore
- List of places UK Wales Bridgend 51.52°N 03.65°W Map of the community

Cefn Cribwr is a village and community in Bridgend County Borough in south Wales. The village is located about 5 miles (8 km) from the centre of Bridgend town, and in-between Bridgend and Pyle.

== Description ==
The village is situated on a ridge (as the name suggests) between Pyle (3 km to the west) and Aberkenfig (4 km to the east). Cefn Cribwr, as a community, recorded a population of 1,546 in the 2001 Census, reducing to 1,481 at the 2011 Census.

The community centre, locally known as the Green Hall, was opened in 1924 and originally conceived as a Miners' Welfare Hall; it was supported by colliery owners and colliers. Many political meetings were held there. Labour politician and former Prime Minister Ramsay MacDonald spoke there in the closing weeks of the General Strike of 1926. The Wesley Dramatic Society entertained, as did the members of Siloam Chapel who performed many dramas and concerts. The community centre is today mainly used as the venue for the meetings of Cefn Cribwr Labour Party.

Bedford Park, on the northern outskirts of Cefn Cribwr, is now an area of 40 acres (16 ha) of ancient woodland and meadows, glades and open spaces. It was once an area of intense industrial activity after the Birmingham industrialist John Bedford built a blast furnace here in 1780. He also sank pits to mine the raw materials of ironstone and coal as well as founding a forge and brickworks. The ironworks were never as successful as Bedford had hoped, and began to decline after his death in 1791. Coal mining and brick making, however, continued throughout the 19th century, but industrial activity at Bedford Park ceased after World War I. The ironworks are now protected as a Scheduled Ancient Monument, one of the most complete of its kind in Britain. Many parts of the ironworks and related buildings can still be seen.

Several public footpaths and cycling routes pass through the park following the line of the old Dyffryn, Llynfi and Porthcawl Railway which linked the ironworks to the coast.

== Governance ==
Cefn Cribwr Community Council comprises 10 community councillors elected from the community.

From the creation of Bridgend County Borough Council in 1995, Cefn Cribwr was also a county electoral ward, coterminous with the community. It elected one county borough councillor.

Following a local government boundary review, Cefn Cribwr ward joined with the neighbouring Pyle to become 'Pyle, Kenfig Hill and Cefn Cribwr' ward, electing 3 councillors at the 2022 Bridgend County Borough Council election.

== Places of worship in Cefn Cribwr ==
=== Bethlehem Church Life Centre ===
The first Bethlehem church was built in 1930. It was enlarged in 1952 by building around the existing old church; once the roof was finished, the first church was knocked down inside the newer second structure. The new Bethlehem church life centre was built in 2005. It can hold a congregation of around 300 people.

=== Calvary English Baptist Church ===
Built in 1907, Calvary is situated on Cefn Road on the opposite side to Cefn school. The building can hold a congregation of about 110. Calvary Baptist Chapel (or Church) has a sister church in Aberkenfig.

=== St Coleman's Church ===
Originally built in 1924, and supported by the vicar of Pen-y-fai, Rev. H. R. Protheroe, and his parishioners. The church was used for meetings and entertainment. In 2007 weddings were allowed to take place there. In September 2005, a new parish priest was appointed together with St Theodore's Church in Kenfig Hill, but it was closed in November 2012.

=== Siloam Chapel ===
Built in 1827, this was the first chapel to be built in Cefn Cribwr. It is the oldest of the six places of worship in the village. It is located at the top of Bedford Road and is set back off the road. The present day chapel is not the original, as the structure was rebuilt in 1855. It is a large structure with a cemetery to the front and rear. The original congregation were Welsh speakers, many of whom were local miners. The Chapel closed in 2017.

=== Nebo Church ===
The second chapel to be built in Cefn Cribwr, it was completed in 1849. It was rebuilt in 1868 as a much larger structure. Nebo and Siloam are the only two places of worship in Cefn Cribwr with cemeteries. The church can be difficult to find, as its entrance is small and the church is tucked away off the main road. There is a baptistry at the front of the church.

=== Wesleyan Chapel ===
Built in 1886, it took just thirteen weeks to build. It is believed to have been built by volunteers, midway between Cefn Cribwr and Kenfig Hill alongside the main road overlooking the common. The building can accommodate a congregation of between 120 and 150.
