= Cefn Glas =

Area on the northwestern outskirts of the town of Bridgend, Wales

Coordinates: 51°30′44″N 3°35′51″W

Cefn Glas is an area on the northwestern outskirts of the town of Bridgend, Wales. It is part of the community of Laleston.

In the 2001 Census, Cefn Glas had a population of 1,742 people, making up 1.35% of Bridgend's total population. This population reduced to 1,537 at the 2011 Census.

Cefn Glas is also the name of the electoral ward to Bridgend County Borough Council, since 1999 electing one county councillor. The ward is bordered to the north and east by the mainline railway and to the west by Nant Cefn.
