= Cornelly =

Coordinates: 51°31′1″N 3°42′15″W

- Community
- Location within Bridgend
- Principal area: Bridgend
- Country: Wales
- Sovereign state: United Kingdom
- Police: South Wales
- Fire: South Wales
- Ambulance: Welsh
- List of places UK Wales Bridgend Map of the community

Cornelly Community, on the western edge of Bridgend County Borough (shaded brown), South Wales.

Cornelly (Welsh: Corneli) is a community and electoral ward in Bridgend County Borough, South Wales. As of 2011 the population of the Cornelly ward was 7,059.

Cornelly was created following The Bridgend (Cynffig, Cornelly and Pyle Communities) (Electoral Changes) Order 2002 which divided Cynffig into Cornelly and Pyle (divided by the mainline railway). Councillors to the new Cornelly Community Council were elected at the May 2004 elections.

Cornelly includes two villages, North Cornelly and South Cornelly, and it is bisected by the A48 and M4. Sand dunes in the area conceal the walled town of Kenfig, founded in the 1120s and overwhelmed in the late 14th century. Another notable local feature is Sker House, a historic building which overlooks the dunes. North Cornelly is part of the urban area of Pyle.

Cornelly is also an electoral ward, coterminous with the community. Prior to April 1996 it was a ward to Ogwr Borough Council and Mid Glamorgan County Council. Since 1995 has elected two county councillors to Bridgend County Borough Council. Initially represented by the Labour Party, it elected two Independent councillors from 2008.
