= Coychurch Lower =

Community in Wales

Coychurch Lower: Welsh: Llangrallo Isaf
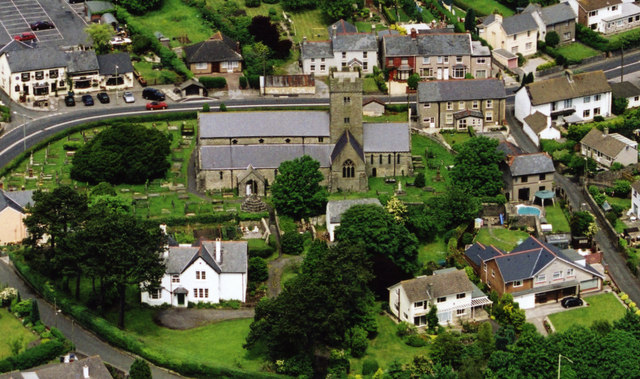
- St.Crallo's Church, Coychurch

- Location within Bridgend
- Population: 1,335 (2021)
- OS grid reference: SS939788
- Community: Coychurch Lower
- Principal area: Bridgend
- Preserved county: Mid Glamorgan
- Country: Wales
- Sovereign state: United Kingdom
- Post town: BRIDGEND
- Postcode district: CF31
- Postcode district: CF35
- Dialling code: 01656
- Police: South Wales
- Fire: South Wales
- Ambulance: Welsh
- UK Parliament: Bridgend
- Senedd Cymru – Welsh Parliament: Bridgend
- List of places UK Wales Bridgend 51.498395°N 3.528979°W Map of the community

Coychurch Lower (Welsh: Llangrallo Isaf) is a community in Bridgend County Borough, South Wales. Along with the communities of Brackla and Bridgend, it makes up the town of Bridgend. Coychurch Lower is the eastern district of Bridgend, and takes in the village of Coychurch and the area of Waterton. Traffic leaving the M4 motorway for Bridgend at Junction 35 travels through Coychurch Lower along the A473 road, passing through an area of business parks and out-of town shopping zones, which take up the majority of the western half of the community. The population of Coychurch Lower at the 2001 census was 1,206, increasing to 1,365 at the 2011 census, before decreasing to 1,335 in 2021.

The community of Coychurch Lower was created in 1974 when the civil parishes of Wales were abolished. In 1996, in a major change to the boundaries of Bridgend, Coychurch Lower gained much of the community of Ewenny and Llangan.

== Landmarks ==
Coychurch Lower has several buildings of note. In the village of Coychurch is the church of St Crallo, one of the largest churches in Glamorgan. Thought to be built on the site of a Celtic clas, St Crallo is a 13th-century cruciform church, described by the English historian Edward Augustus Freeman as making "an admiral model for a small colonial cathedral". The church has undergone several restorations, including interior work in 1871 by John Prichard and a reconstruction of the south transept in 1888 by F.R. Kempson. St Crallo also contains several monuments, including a 14th-century figure of a praying monk and a memorial to Welsh lexicographer Thomas Richards.

Also in Coychurch is the Mid Glamorgan Crematorium, one of the last commissions of Maxwell Fry. The building is notable for its stained glass windows, described as one of the most important recent displays in the county. Other buildings of note include the headquarters of South Wales Police and Coed-y-Mwstwr, a 19th-century country house in the Tudor style.
