= Pyle =

Pyle: Welsh: Y Pîl
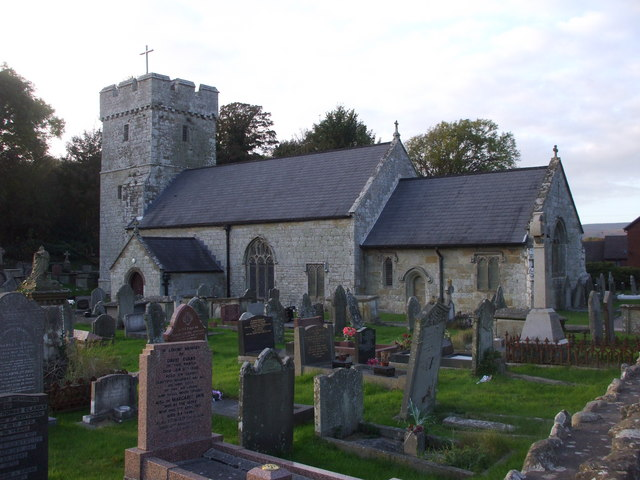
- The Church of St James in Pyle

- Location within Bridgend
- Population: 7,405 (2011 census)
- OS grid reference: SS825825
- Community: Pyle
- Principal area: Bridgend
- Preserved county: Mid Glamorgan
- Country: Wales
- Sovereign state: United Kingdom
- Post town: BRIDGEND
- Postcode district: CF33
- Dialling code: 01656
- Police: South Wales
- Fire: South Wales
- Ambulance: Welsh
- UK Parliament: Aberafan Maesteg
- Senedd Cymru – Welsh Parliament: Bridgend
- List of places UK Wales Bridgend 51°31′44″N 03°41′36″W Map of the community

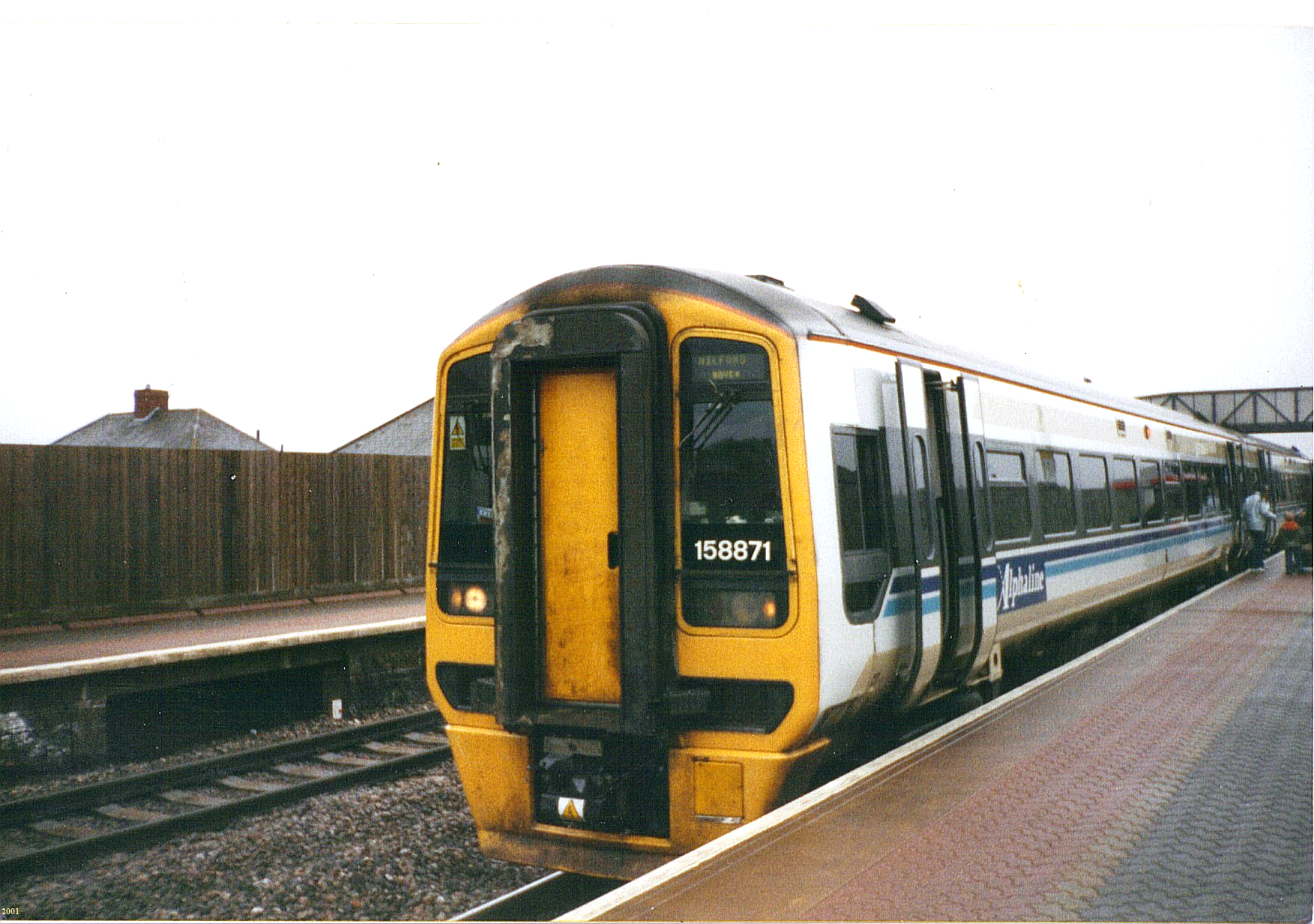
A Wales & West Class 158 train at Pyle station in 2001

Pyle Community, on the south-western boundary of Bridgend County Borough (shaded brown), South Wales.

Pyle (Welsh: Y Pîl) is a village and community (and electoral ward) in Bridgend county borough, Wales. This large village is served by the A48 road, and lies less than one mile from Junction 37 of the M4 motorway, and is therefore only a half-hour journey from the capital city of Wales, Cardiff. The nearest town is the seaside resort of Porthcawl. Within the Community, to the northeast of Pyle, is the adjoining settlement of Kenfig Hill, North Cornelly also adjoins Pyle and the built-up area had a population of 13,701 in 2011.

== Etymology ==
The English name "Pyle" is derived from the Welsh Pîl, meaning a tidal inlet of the sea, this localised toponym is found along the coast of South Wales, from Pembrokeshire and into Somerset. In this instance it may refer to the mouth of the River Kenfig, which is tidal for its first mile from the sea.

A commonly stated, but erroneous derivation from the English word "pile" (a stake) is highly unlikely, with the only settlement in the United Kingdom known to have this derivation being a hamlet on the Isle of Wight.

== Location ==
Pyle is located approximately 26 miles west of Cardiff, 16 miles east of Swansea, 4 miles west of Bridgend and 6 miles southeast of Port Talbot. It is on the main A48 road from Cardiff to Swansea and is just north of the M4 motorway which has superseded the trunk road for through traffic. Junction 37 on the motorway is one mile south of Pyle. Other communities in the vicinity are South Cornelly, North Cornelly, Kenfig and Porthcawl. Pyle railway station is on the Cardiff to Swansea section of the London to South Wales Main Line.

== Early history ==
An indication of early settlement is the Croes Siencyn Incised Stone, a Scheduled monument on Marlas Road, (51.5275°N 3.6989°W, grid ref: SS822823). This is a weathered stone with an incised cross, dated to 11th or 12th century, moved to its present garden location in 1945 from 'between Kenfig and Pyle'. The early expansion of Pyle was brought about when the ancient borough of Kenfig was abandoned after being overwhelmed by sand during a catastrophic encroachment by the sea in the mid fifteenth-century. The road through Kenfig was diverted one and a half miles inland and brought Pyle to prominence while Kenfig dwindled into a straggle of a few houses. The walls of Pyle St James' parish church are reputed to have been moved stone by stone from the old town, relocated further inland as the sand encroached. This gave rise to the church sometimes being referred to as the upside-down church, because the first stones moved would have been the higher ones in the original church.

Writing in 1870, in the Imperial Gazetteer of England and Wales, John Marius Wilson described the parish of Pyle, including Kenfig and Skerr, to comprise 4,526 acres (1,832 ha) of land and 725 acres (293 ha) of water. In 1861, the population of the village was 1,192 distributed among 251 households. Real property in the village of Pyle was valued at £3,949, of which £1,619 was in mines. Besides the thriving collieries there were also coking plants and ironworks as well as a quarry where good quality building stone was extracted.

== Recent history ==
The street of Longlands Close in Pyle was the site of a coaching inn which was used by passing travelers using the west Wales to London turnpike. Lord Nelson stayed at Pyle Inn on his way to visit to naval installations in Pembrokeshire, as did Isambard Kingdom Brunel during the construction of the Great Western Railway line through South Wales.

Pyle was made a community in 2002, when the Cynffig community was split into two parts (the other being Cornelly), following a recommendation of the Local Government Boundary Commission for Wales.

== Governance ==
Pyle is the name of the electoral ward which is coterminous with the community. The ward elects three county councillors to Bridgend County Borough Council.

== Village facilities ==
The village has its own leisure centre, swimming pool, supermarket, library and petrol station. The leisure centre is a frequent school trip destination, attracting schools from the Cardiff area. There is also a large industrial estate which hosts some notable names and a garden centre. An area of woodland known as The Collwyn is close to the west side of the village. In 2010 Pyle Community Council were able to buy the strip of woodland, with its stream and old watermill, to ensure its survival and use for the village.

There are three schools in the community: Cynffig Comprehensive School, Mynydd Cynffig Primary School and Pil Primary School. Pyle Rugby Football Club plays in the WRU Swalec League Division 3.

== Religion ==
Kenfig Hill, though a smaller settlement, has four places of worship. St Theodore's (Church in Wales), was built in 1889, and became a parish in 1923. Also in Kenfig Hill are Pisgah Chapel, (Welsh Baptist), Bethal Community Church and St Joseph's Church (Roman Catholic).

Within Pyle itself there is Mount Zion Chapel (English Baptist) and the parish church of St James (Church in Wales) is a Grade I listed building. It was built in around 1471 as is indicated by a carving of the figures on a small wooden shield on a wallplate. It is unclear to what extent the present building adheres to the original structure because there are variations in construction methods and in the stone used. The church is considered to be a fine example of a mainly Perpendicular, two-cell church with a nave and chancel. The tower at the west end bears a clock.

== See also ==
- List of Scheduled Monuments in Bridgend
