= Bridgend (Senedd constituency) =

Senedd constituency (1999–2026)

Coordinates: 51.507°N 3.581°W

Bridgend Pen-y-bont ar Ogwr
- Former Senedd county constituency for the Senedd
- Bridgend shown as one of the 40; Senedd constituencies

Former Senedd county constituency
- Created: 1999
- Abolished: 2026
- Party: Labour
- MS: Sarah Murphy
- Electoral region: South Wales West
- Preserved county: Mid Glamorgan and West Glamorgan

Bridgend (Welsh: Pen-y-bont ar Ogwr) was a constituency of the Senedd. It elected one Member of the Senedd by the first past the post method of election. Also, however, it was one of seven constituencies in the South Wales West electoral region, which elected four additional members, in addition to seven constituency members, to produce a degree of proportional representation for the region as a whole.

== History ==
Bridgend could have been considered a relatively safe Labour seat. The former First Minister Carwyn Jones had represented the constituency since the creation of the assembly until 2021. The former Secretary of State for Wales Alun Cairns contested the seat in 1999 and 2003.

== Boundaries ==
Map of 1999–2026 boundaries

The constituency was created for the first election to the Assembly, in 1999, with the name and boundaries of the Bridgend Westminster constituency prior to the 2023 review of Westminster constituencies. It was partly within the preserved county of Mid Glamorgan and partly within the preserved county of South Glamorgan.

The other six constituencies of the region were Aberavon, Gower, Neath, Ogmore, Swansea East and Swansea West.

== Voting ==
In general elections for the Senedd, each voter had two votes. The first vote was used to vote for a candidate to become the Member of the Senedd for the voter's constituency, elected by the first past the post system. The second vote was used to vote for a regional closed party list of candidates. Additional member seats were allocated from the lists by the d'Hondt method, with constituency results being taken into account in the allocation.

== Members of the Senedd ==
Between 1999 and 2021, the member for the constituency was Carwyn Jones, who became First Minister of Wales in 2009 and served until 2018. In 2021, Sarah Murphy became the MS, serving until 2026.

Election	Member	Party	Portrait
1999	Carwyn Jones	Labour	
2021	Sarah Murphy	Labour	

== Elections ==
=== Elections in the 2020s ===
2021 Senedd election: Bridgend
Party	Candidate	Constituency			Regional		
Party	Candidate	Votes	%	±%	Votes	%	±%
Labour	Sarah Murphy	12,388	42.0	-3.3	11,439	38.8	+2.5
Conservative	Rachel Nugent-Finn	8,324	28.3	+3.9	8,712	29.5	+6.9
Plaid Cymru	Leanne Lewis	3,091	10.5	+0.9	4,006	13.6	+1.0
Independent	Steven Bletsoe	3,046	10.3	New			
Independent	Caroline Jones (Note: Incumbent member on the party list, or for another constituency)	1,064	3.6	New	822	2.8	New
Liberal Democrats	Harvey Jones	782	2.7	-1.3	792	2.7	-3.0
Reform UK	Christine Roach	534	1.8	New	298	1.0	New
Gwlad	Geraint David Jones	232	0.8	New	245	0.8	New
Abolish					1,258	4.3	-0.5
Green					1,119	3.8	+1.1
UKIP					381	1.3	-12.9
Propel					193	0.7	New
Freedom Alliance (UK)					150	0.5	New
Communist					65	0.2	±0.0
TUSC					27	0.1	-0.2
Majority		4,064	13.7	−7.2			
Turnout		29,461	45.01	+0.4			
Labour hold		Swing					
Notes

Regional Ballot void votes: 182. Want of an Official Mark (2), Voting for more than ONE party or individual candidate (48), Writing or mark by which the Voter could be identified (1), Unmarked or Void for uncertainty (131)

=== Elections in the 2010s ===
Welsh Assembly Election 2016: Bridgend
Party	Candidate	Constituency			Regional		
Party	Candidate	Votes	%	±%	Votes	%	±%
Labour	Carwyn Jones	12,166	45.3	−10.9	9,724	36.3	-9.3
Conservative	George Jabbour	6,543	24.4	−3.6	6,043	22.6	-3.8
UKIP	Caroline Jones	3,919	14.6	New	3,804	14.2	+11.1
Plaid Cymru	James Radcliffe	2,569	9.6	+1.0	3,375	12.6	+2.9
Liberal Democrats	Jonathan Pratt	1,087	4.0	−3.2	1,519	5.7	-0.9
Green	Charlie Barlow	567	2.1	New	712	2.7	+1.2
Abolish					1,293	4.8	New
Monster Raving Loony					173	0.6	New
TUSC					87	0.3	-0.1
Communist					65	0.2	±0.0
Majority		5,623	20.9	−7.3			
Turnout		26,851	44.6	+3.8			
Labour hold		Swing	−3.6				

Welsh Assembly Election 2011: Bridgend
Party	Candidate	Constituency			Regional		
Party	Candidate	Votes	%	±%	Votes	%	±%
Labour	Carwyn Jones	13,499	56.2	+15.9	10,671	45.6	
Conservative	Alex Williams	6,724	28.0	−1.9	6,184	26.4	
Plaid Cymru	Tim Thomas	2,706	8.6	−6.1	2,281	9.7	
Liberal Democrats	Briony Davies	1,736	7.2	−8.0	1,536	6.6	
UKIP					719	3.1	
Socialist Labour					669	2.9	
BNP					627	2.7	
Green					340	1.5	
Welsh Christian					256	1.1	New
TUSC					86	0.4	New
Communist					58	0.2	
Majority		6,775	28.2	+17.8			
Turnout		24,035	40.8	−0.4			
Labour hold		Swing	+8.9				

Regional ballots rejected: 195

=== Elections in the 2000s ===
Welsh Assembly Election 2007: Bridgend
Party	Candidate	Constituency			Regional		
Party	Candidate	Votes	%	±%	Votes	%	±%
Labour	Carwyn Jones (Note: Incumbent member for this constituency)	9,889	40.3	−2.5	7,727		
Conservative	Emma L. Greenow	7,333	29.9	−2.0	5,793		
Liberal Democrats	Paul Warren	3,730	15.2	+1.7	3,754		
Plaid Cymru	Nick H. Thomas	3,600	14.7	+5.9	2,837		
BNP					1,284		New
UKIP					1,021		
Green					845		
Socialist Labour					302	0.	New
Welsh Christian					271		New
Socialist Alternative (UK)					135		New
Keith James - Independent					239		New
CPA					92	0.	New
Respect					77	0.	New
Communist					75	0.	New
Joel Jenkins - Independent					63	0.	New
Majority		2,556	10.4	−0.5			
Turnout		24,552	41.2	+5.8			
Labour hold		Swing	-0.25				

Welsh Assembly Election 2003: Bridgend
Party	Candidate	Constituency			Regional		
Party	Candidate	Votes	%	±%	Votes	%	±%
Labour	Carwyn Jones	9,487	42.8	+5.6	7,790		
Conservative	Alun Cairns	7,066	31.9	+11.7	6,470		
Liberal Democrats	Cheryl A. Green	2,980	13.5	−2.1	2,863		
Plaid Cymru	Keith Parry	1,939	8.8	−10.9	2,608		
UKIP	Tim C. Jenkins	677	3.1	New	713		
Green					901		
Socialist Labour					370		
Cymru Annibynnol					181		
ProLife Alliance					50	0.	
Majority		2,421	10.9	−6.1			
Turnout		22,113	35.4	−6.2			
Labour hold		Swing	−3.1				

2003 Electorate: 62,540
Regional ballots rejected: 319

=== Elections in the 1990s ===
Welsh Assembly Election 1999: Bridgend
Party	Candidate	Votes	%	±%
Labour	Carwyn Jones	9,321	37.2	N/A
Conservative	Alun Cairns	5,063	20.2	N/A
Plaid Cymru	Jeff R. Canning	4,919	19.7	N/A
Liberal Democrats	Rob O. Humphreys	3,910	15.6	N/A
Independent	Allan Jones	1,819	7.3	N/A
Majority		4,258	17.0	N/A
Turnout		25,032	41.6	N/A
Labour win (new seat)				

== Notes ==
Senedd
Preceded by Cardiff West	Constituency represented by the First Minister; 2009 – 2018	Incumbent
