= Brackla =

Brackla: Welsh: Bracla
- Location within Bridgend
- Population: 11,749 (2011)
- OS grid reference: SS925805
- Community: Brackla
- Principal area: Bridgend
- Preserved county: Mid Glamorgan
- Country: Wales
- Sovereign state: United Kingdom
- Post town: BRIDGEND
- Postcode district: CF31
- Dialling code: 01656
- Police: South Wales
- Fire: South Wales
- Ambulance: Welsh
- UK Parliament: Bridgend
- Senedd Cymru – Welsh Parliament: Bridgend
- List of places UK Wales Bridgend 51.513°N 03.551°W Map of the community

Brackla (Welsh: Bracla) is a large housing estate and community in the east of Bridgend in Bridgend County Borough, Wales. Along with the communities of Bridgend and Coychurch Lower, it makes up the town of Bridgend.

At the 2001 census the community of Brackla had a population of 10,113, increasing to 11,749 at the 2011 Census, making up nearly a quarter of Bridgend's population.

== History ==
Until 1936, the 900 acres (3.6 km^{2}) of land occupied east to west by the Bridgend Industrial Estate, Brackla and the Brackla Industrial Estate was farmland. In 1936, in view of the increasing likelihood of war with Germany, the British Government decided to build two new Royal Ordnance Factories, including one at Bridgend on the site of what is now Bridgend Industrial Estate.

To store munitions, they dug eight long shafts under Brackla Hill, connecting it to two new ordnance factories on what is now Brackla Industrial Estate. Both facilities were connected to the Great Western Railway South Wales Main Line, with the line to the Brackla facility running along what is now Church Acre. At its peak, ROF 53 employed some 40,000 people, and was the biggest single factory in Western Europe.

After World War II, ROF 53 stopped production at the end of 1945, and closed completely by the end of 1946. The land was sold to property developers, with that north of the railway developed for housing.

=== Nuclear Bunker ===
In the late 1960s, two of the former munitions tunnels were redeveloped by the Ministry of Defence on behalf of the Home Office as a nuclear command bunker for South Wales, designated SRHQ 8.2. Brackla became the regional control centre for all of Wales, redesignated RGHQ 8.2. Sold in 1996, it has been derelict ever since.

== Governance ==
Brackla was the name of the electoral ward, coterminous with the community. The ward elected four county councillors to Bridgend County Borough Council.

Following a local government boundary review, the Brackla ward was divided into four single-member electoral wards: Brackla West, Brackla West Central, Brackla East Central, Brackla East and Coychurch Lower. This was effective from the 2022 local elections.

At the community level, Brackla elects 11 community councillors (and one youth councillor) to Brackla Community Council.

== Today ==
Brackla has four primary schools; Brackla Primary, Tremains Primary; Archdeacon John Lewis Church in Wales School & Ysgol Gymraeg Bro Ogwr. Archbishop McGrath Catholic High School is a secondary school in the area.

Brackla contains a small shopping centre, named the Triangle, consisting of a supermarket and other convenience stores. Brackla has only three Public Houses situated in the area.

Brackla Community Council has recently begun work to gain Nature Reserve status for the local Tremains Wood. The area had come under abuse in recent years and the council aims to clean it up, with the eventual aim of replacing the bridges and have structured woodland walkways.

=== Transport ===
During World War II, the GWR station called Tremains Halt provided service to ROF 53 and afterwards to the trading estate. The station closed in the early 1960s. There is an ongoing investigation by Bridgend Borough Council to install a Park and Ride facility on the former station site, to serve both Brackla and the wider Bridgend area.
