= Ogwr =

Former district of Mid Glamorgan, Wales

Coordinates: 51.5087°N 3.5782°W

- Ogwr shown within Wales
- History
  - Created: 1974
  - Abolished: 1996
  - Succeeded by: Bridgend County Borough
- Status: Borough
  - HQ: Bridgend

The Borough of Ogwr was one of six districts of Mid Glamorgan in Wales, which existed from 1974 to 1996.

== History ==
It was formed under the Local Government Act 1972 from the urban districts of Bridgend, Maesteg, Ogmore and Garw and Porthcawl, along with Penybont Rural District from the administrative county of Glamorgan. The district took its name from the Welsh name of the main river through the district, the River Ogmore (Welsh: Afon Ogwr).

In 1996 most of Ogwr became part of Bridgend County Borough, with the Vale of Glamorgan taking the communities of Wick, St Brides Major and Ewenny.

== Ogwr Borough Council ==
Ogwr Borough Council was a second tier district council of Mid Glamorgan. County councillors were elected from the borough to Mid Glamorgan County Council.

The first election to the council was held in 1973, initially operating as a shadow authority before coming into its powers on 1 April 1974. Political control of the council from 1974 until its abolition in 1996 was as follows:

Party in control	Years
Labour	1974–1976
No overall control	1976–1987
Labour	1987–1996

Ogwr Borough Council comprised 58 councillors at its first elections in 1973, elected from 25 wards. The final full elections were in May 1991.

=== Premises ===
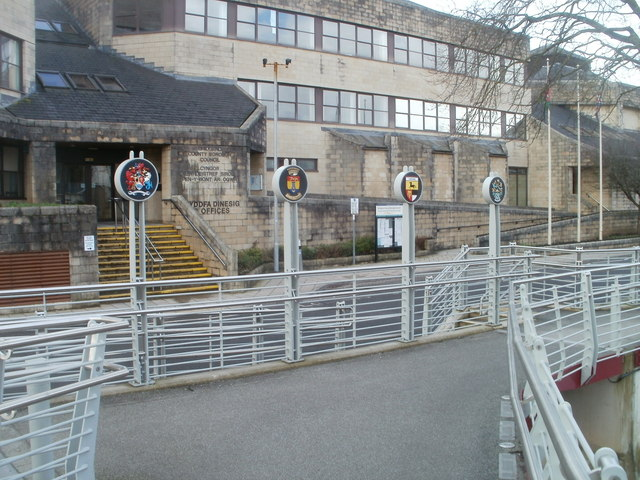
Civic Offices, Angel Street, Bridgend

When the council was created in 1974 it was initially based at new offices called the Municipal Buildings, which had been built as part of The Rhiw shopping centre on Queen Street in Bridgend. In 1986 it moved to a new building called the Civic Offices on Angel Street in Bridgend, on the banks of the river which gave the district its name. Following the council's abolition in 1996 the Civic Offices became the headquarters for the new Bridgend County Borough Council.
