= Kidwelly (disambiguation) =

Kidwelly is a town in Carmarthenshire, Wales.

Kidwelly may also refer to:

== Places ==
- Kidwelly Castle, a Norman castle in Kidwelly, Wales
- Kidwelly Priory, a former Benedictine priory in Kidwelly, Wales

== Institutions ==
- Kidwelly RFC, a rugby club representing Kidwelly, Wales
- Kidwelly Industrial Museum, a museum about the Kidwelly tinplate industry
- Kidwelly Town Council, the town council of Mynydd-y-Garreg, Wales and Kidwelly, Wales

== People ==
- Maurice de Londres (died 1166), Lord of Kidwelly
- Isabella de Beauchamp (c. 1263–1306), Lady of Kidwelly
- Patrick de Chaworth (died 1283), Lord of Kidwelly and wife of Isabella de Beauchamp

== Transportation ==
- Kidwelly railway station, a railroad station in Kidwelly, Wales
- Kidwelly and Llanelly Canal, a former canal system in Carmarthenshire, Wales
- Kidwelly Flats Halt railway station, a former British military railroad station in Pembrey, Wales

== Other ==
- Kidwelly sex cult, a former cult in Kidwelly, Wales

== See also ==
- Kidwell (disambiguation)
