= De Lundin =

Surname of Norman origin

de Lundin (Londres, Lundie, Lundy, Lundyn, Londonius, Londoniis, Lander, Landress or Lenders) is the surname of an old Norman noble family. The family descends from Thomas Londoniis c.1005, whose son William de Londres was one of the 12 Knights of Glamorgan. It is also English (of Norman origin) and Irish habitational name from Norman French de Londres ‘of London’, gaelicized in Ireland as de Londras. Additionally, it is German and Dutch patronymic from Lander, Landress or Lenders.

After the Norman conquest they settled in Fife. The family has a long military history, and was one of the most successful families in Scotland for several hundred years before losing power. The agnatic line of the family ended sometime in the 12th century, and survived only via an heiress, a certain Lady de Lundin who married Robert, the bastard son of William the Lion. Robert adopted the family name and it is from this couple that the cognatic line descends. Due to this, in 1679 King Charles II granted the family and all of its descendants the right to bear the Scottish royal coat of arms.

== French origin ==
The family descends from Thomas Londoniis c.1005.

== Wales ==
William de Londres, one of the Twelve Knights of Glamorgan and son of Thomas Londoniis, obtained lands in Glamorgan, the Lordship and castle of Ogmore and the castle and Manor of Dunraven when he accompanied Robert Fitzhamon in the Norman conquest of Glamorgan. William's son, Maurice de Londres, went on to expand the family's holdings. He became Marcher Lord of Kidwelly, and defeated Gwenllian ferch Gruffydd in 1136 at the Battle of Kidwelly Castle, who he beheaded after the battle.

== Scotland ==
Thomas de Londoniis settled in Scotland in the 12th century. King Malcolm IV of Scotland granted to Malcolm his son the barony of Lundie, Forfar and to his other son Philip, the barony of Lundin, Fife. Their descendant Alan, adopted the surname Durward (Doorward) after the position of warden of the king's door that he held. Thomas de Lundin was the hostarius of King Alexander II of Scotland until his own death. Some of their descendants living in England migrated to what is now France, the Netherlands, or northern Germany to escape political persecution, taking on modified family names such as de Lundin, Londres, Lundie, Lundy, Lundyn, Londonius, Londoniis, Lander, Landress or Lenders.

In 1679, King Charles II granted this family and all their descendants the right to wear the Scottish royal coat of arms, and it was only then that some of their descendants were able to emigrate to England.
