= Court Farm, Pembrey =

Ruined house in Carmarthenshire, Wales

Court Farm
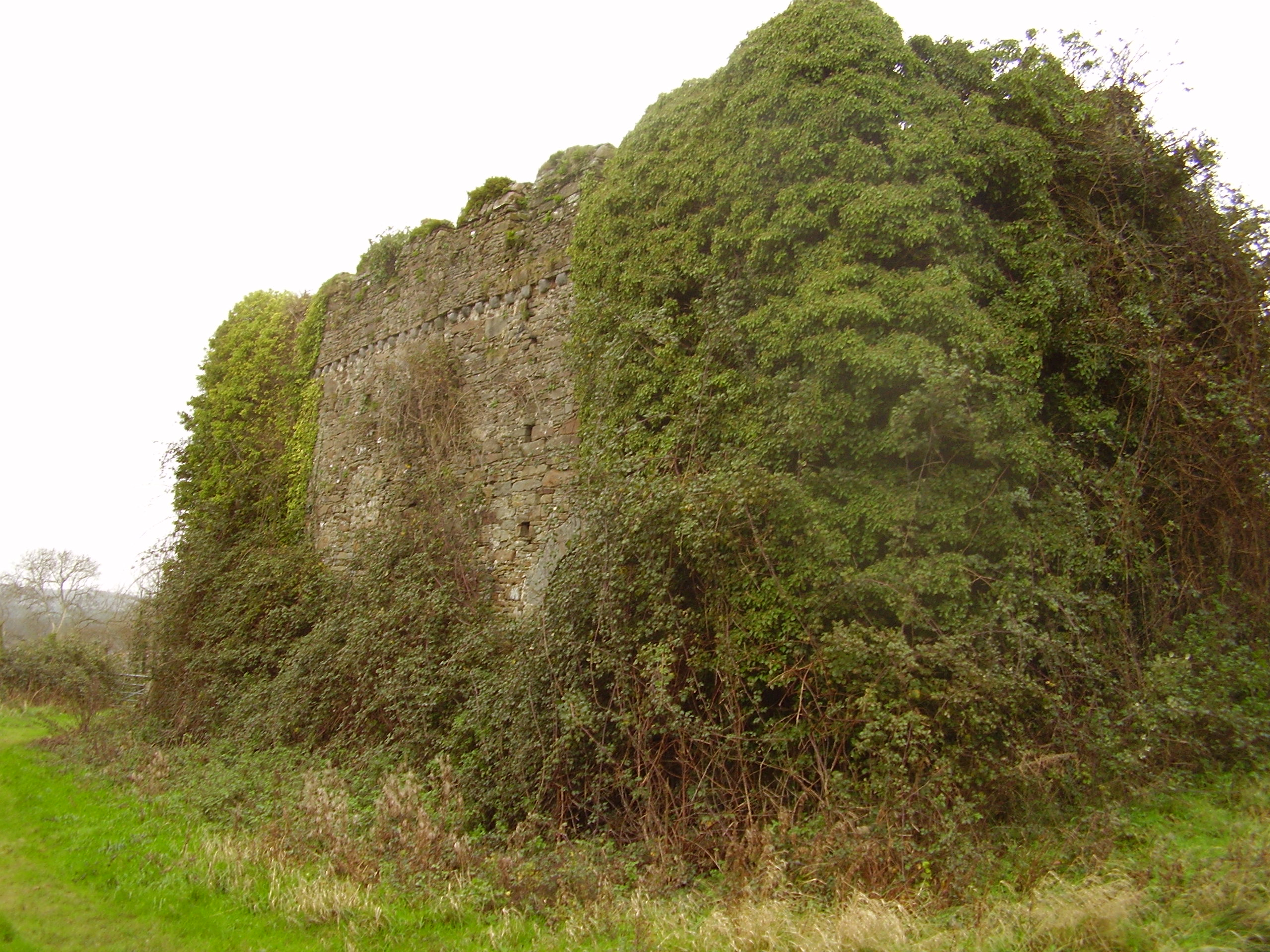
- The barn at Court Farm, Pembrey
- Interactive map of the Court Farm area

General information
- Architectural style: Jacobean
- Location: Ar-Y-Bryn, Burry Port, Wales SA16 0AX
- Coordinates: 51.6911°N 4.2761°W
- Opened: 16th century

Technical details
- Material: Sandstone
- Floor count: 2 (house)

Court Farm in Pembrey, Carmarthenshire, Wales, is an ancient and formerly imposing manor house which is now an overgrown ruin, but structurally sound, and capable of repair and restoration. It consists of three buildings: the farmhouse, a complex two-storey house of approximately 99 square metres; an adjacent barn; and a later cowshed.

== Construction ==
The present farmhouse is 16th century, with an earlier medieval core, and may have been a tower house, a form more associated with Pembrokeshire. It is built from local sandstone quarried from a quarry located in its own land, known as Garreg Llwyd Quarry. Court Farm has a line of corbels on the south facing walls which are a particular feature of old Carmarthenshire buildings and, because of its size and visible location it was, together with the nearby St. Illtud's Church, Pembrey, used a navigational point on local shipping charts to help captains of vessels navigate the treacherous Burry Inlet.

Originally, there were seven square chimneys, two of which were unusually set diagonally in the chimney breast in the east wall. It appears that every room had a fireplace, yet the 1672 hearth tax lists the Court as only having two fireplaces, probably to avoid paying tax of two shillings. Similarly, many of the early windows were blocked up to avoid paying the half-yearly window tax of 3 shillings. One room retained its Jacobean panelling until Court Farm was abandoned in around 1948.

Court Farm has an interesting large barn, with a defensive military appearance, due its embattled parapet on the south elevation. It is not known if the barn had a defensive function of any kind, although it could be part of a more extensive curtain wall. The Pembrey area was "frontier land" in Medieval times, lying between the Norman occupied areas of the east, and the Welsh kingdom, north-west of Kidwelly, which continued to attack the Norman strongholds.

== Ownership by the Le Botelers ==
Evidence suggests that the Le Boteler family were the first to occupy a manor on the site of the present Court Farm.

Maurice de Londres granted the Manor of Pembrey to Sir John Butler of Dunraven Castle in 1128. Maurice de Londres was the son of William de Londres, who was a knight to Robert Fitzhamon, a Norman baron from Gloucestershire.

Fitzhamon invaded Wales between 1091 and 1093, established himself as Lord of Glamorgan and built Cardiff Castle. The knights protecting his castle included William de Londres. As a reward for his services, Fitzhamon gave William the lordship of Ogmore. William went on to help Roger, Bishop of Salisbury, defend his lordship at Kidwelly from attacks by the adjacent Welsh kingdom of Deheubarth. On one of his expeditions to Kidwelly, the inhabitants of Glamorgan attacked Ogmore Castle. William’s butler, called Arnold, successfully repulsed the attack and was rewarded with the castle and manor of Dunraven. To mark his loyalty, Arnold called himself Arnold le Boteler; the Norman word for butler is Le Boteler, or Boteler. The family surname was later anglicized to Butler.

Maurice de Londres succeeded to the lordship of Ogmore, upon the death of his father, William, in 1126. In 1128, Maurice also became Lord of Kidwelly when Roger, Bishop of Salisbury, returned his lordship to The Crown, having found it too difficult to protect from the attacks of Deheubarth. The Crown then gave the lordship to Maurice. In the same year, Maurice granted the Manor of Pembrey to Arnold Butler’s son, Sir John Butler, whose male line of issue included seven generations, most of them named John Butler. The line became extinct when Arnold Butler, of Pembrey and Dunraven, died without issue. Arnold’s sister, Ann Butler, then inherited both estates.

The manor of Pembrey was held under military tenure under the Lordship of Kidwelly. The occupation of the Manor of Pembrey required each Butler occupant, in time of war, to provide five archers "according to ancient custom" to help the Lord of Kidwelly within the limits of the land under his control. The Butlers also had to order one knight to attend the "Court of Foreignry of Kidwelly", which was held every month. Each Butler heir also had an obligation to pay a sum of money to the Lord of Kidwelly of ten shillings, to give a day’s ploughing and to help with the hay for one day.

One of the woods that originally lay on the manorial land of Court Farm is known as Coed Marchog (Knight's Wood, in the English language), it lies on the eastern side of the Pembrey to Pinged Road, below Garreg Lwyd.

The Butler's coat of arms appears in Pembrey Church. Its heraldic device is azure, three cups covered, or (heraldry). The Butler coat of arms can be found in the south east window of the nave of St Illtud’s Church, Pembrey. A monument and altar-tomb of Sir John le Boteler, of circa 1250, can be found at St Brides Major church

In addition to the land surrounding Court Farm, the Butlers also controlled the vast area of flatlands known as Pembrey Burrows, or the Warren, and the greater part of Pinged Marsh, which is now part of Pembrey Country Park. The Butlers were granted rights to all wrecks found on the Cefn Sidan sands as far as Caldicot Point or Tywyn Point

The original caput of the Manor of Pembrey was probably the mound castle now called ‘the Twmpath’, which is located about a mile and a half to the north-east of Burry Port Station. This tumulus is 100 feet (30 m) in diameter, with a ditch of about 12 feet (3.7 m) wide and about 5 feet (1.5 m) deep surrounding it. The Twmpath has extensive views, but at some stage it became inconvenient and the caput of the Manor was relocated to the site of the present location of Court Farm.

== Ownership by the Vaughans ==
Ann Butler was the last of the Pembrey Butlers. She married Sir Richard Vaughan of Bredwardine, in Herefordshire, the Court Farm and Dunraven estates then became part of the Vaughan family estates.

The Vaughans claimed to be direct descendants of the Welsh king Moreiddig Warwyn of Breconshire and north Carmarthenshire. The family has an unusual coat of arms: three boys' heads with snakes coupled around their necks. This is based on a family legend. When the pregnant mother of Moreiddig Warwyn (Warwyn means "fair neck" in Welsh) was resting in the garden, she was frightened by an adder. Moreiddig was born with a mark, resembling the bite of the adder, on his neck.

Sir Richard Vaughan was born in 1460 and was knighted at Tournai, in 1513. He became High sheriff of Herefordshire in 1530, and again in 1541. Sir Richard was succeeded by his son, Sir Walter Vaughan (1500–1584), who inherited the three estates of Pembrey, Dunraven and Bredwardine. Sir Walter was born at Dunraven Castle, where his parents had decided to live. After his marriage, he moved to Pembrey, and Court Farm was built as a wedding present for him by his father, in about 1530. The Vaughan part of the current building is the main L-shaped section, facing south and east. Sir Walter was High Sheriff of Carmarthenshire in 1557 and also a Member of Parliament for Carmarthenshire. His son, Sir Thomas Vaughan, inherited the three estates and added to it the Fullerston Estate, in Wiltshire. Sir Thomas was High Sheriff of Carmarthenshire in 1566 and 1570. Sir Thomas had a son, also called Sir Walter Vaughan, who inherited the estates but decided to live at Fullerston. He added Caldicot Farm to the estate holdings, in around 1607. During this period, Court Farm was occupied by Sir Walter’s nephew, Roland Vaughan, until the next Vaughan heir, Sir Charles Vaughan, was old enough to take possession. Charles was Sir Walter’s son by his first wife. He bought Porthaml Mansion, near Talgarth in Breconshire, and Court Farm was then occupied by his son, Sir George Vaughan.

Sir George Vaughan was a fervent Royalists and supported King Charles I against Oliver Cromwell, in the English Civil War. As a consequence, in 1648, Sir George Vaughan was imprisoned by Cromwell for a short time at Southwark and fined £2,609 for his "Delinquency". Cromwell is believed to have passed through the parish of Pembrey in 1648, on his way to Ireland and his soldiers may have visited Court Farm to charge and apprehend Sir George at that time. Sir George returned to Court Farm, but the huge fine meant that he had to sell the Dunraven estate, in 1648, and the Fullerston estate, in 1649.

Sir George died without issue and the remaining Pembrey and Porthaml estates passed to his younger brother, the Reverend Frederick Vaughan, who had been blind from infancy as a result of smallpox. Frederick Vaughan’s only son, Sir Walter Vaughan, married Alice Bond of Wiltshire, in 1653. They lived, in turn, on both estates and had two children, Bridget and Walter. The male line of the Vaughans of Pembrey ended when Sir Walter’s son died in his first year.

After the death of Sir Walter Vaughan, Alice Vaughan married William Ball in 1655. He was a lawyer of Gray's Inn and became High Sheriff of Carmarthenshire in 1682 and died in 1701. They lived, in turn, at the Porthaml and Pembrey estates.

Many famous people are said to have been entertained at the Court, including the painters Van Dyke, Lely and Reynolds, who painted the Vaughan family. Some of these portraits can now be seen in Carmarthen museum.

== Relationship with the Dalton family ==
Under the Vaughans, the Pembrey Estate was administered by agents comprising at least three generations of the "capable and loyal" Dalton family. It was probably during this period that a number of fireplaces were blocked up. One of Court Farm’s more impressive architectural features comprises seven tall chimneys, made up of five single stacks and two diagonal twin stacks. These reflect a house of substance with many hearths, but the 1672 Hearth Tax records the house as having only two fireplaces. As an economy measure, many of the original fireplaces were blocked-up in order to avoid paying Hearth Tax at the then substantial rate of two shillings per hearth.

The Dalton family appear to originate from Witney in Oxfordshire, and some of the family are buried at St. Illtud’s Church, Pembrey, where entries can be found in the Church’s burial register.

== Relationship with the Ashburnhams ==
Bridget Vaughan married John Ashburnham, 1st Earl of Ashburnham, in 1677 at Henry VII's Chapel, in Westminster Abbey. She was 17 and he was 21 years old. Thereafter they lived at the family's ancestral mansion, Ashburnham Place, in Ashburnham, near Battle, Sussex and made only occasional visits to the other estates.

The Ashburnham family had been settled in Sussex for many generations, taking their name from a village called Ashburnham located about 8 miles (13 km) north-west of Hastings. Like the Vaughan family, the Ashburnham family were fervent Royalists. They suffered heavy fines and imprisonment by the Parliamentarians. After the Restoration, the family was given numerous crown leases to compensate for losses under the commonwealth, and the post of Groom of the Bedchamber.

Lord John Ashburnham was married 10 years before he saw Court Farm. He noted in his diary, on Sunday, 3 July 1687, that:

"I saw Pembrey House (Court), which is an old stone house, large enough and kept in pretty good repaire. The land hereabouts is very good."

In 1697 the government introduced a window tax of three shillings per window. In order to reduce the amount of tax payable, the Ashburnham estate arranged for many of Court Farm’s stone and wooden mullion windows to be blocked up. Window tax was repealed in 1851, but the large windows on the west of the house have remained blocked to the present day.

John Ashburnham died at his London residence in Southampton Street, Bloomsbury, on 21 January 1709 aged 44. His eldest son, William, succeeded him as second baron but died of smallpox on 16 June 1710. The Ashburnham Estates then passed to his brother John, who became third baron. On 14 May 1730, he became Viscount St Asaph of the Principality of Wales and Earl of Ashburnham. The family had been elevated in the peerage, because a viscount is one step above the lowest rank of baron. He died on 10 March 1736–7 at the age of 49 and his only son, John, succeeded to the estate as John Ashburnham, 2nd Earl of Ashburnham. The second Earl died on 8 April 1812 aged 87 and his only son, George Ashburnham, succeeded as George Ashburnham, 3rd Earl of Ashburnham.

In 1813, George Ashburnham took legal action to bar the entail of his Pembrey Estate so that he could regain the freehold. After that he could mortgage the estate, which he did on 15 June 1824, together with his other Carmarthenshire and Breconshire properties. Lord Lovaine and Robert Vyner, Esq. of Gautby, Lincolnshire were the mortgagees, and the loan was £19,403,4s, 6d.

George Ashburnham died on 27 October 1830 and his son Bertram became the fourth earl. When visiting the Pembrey Estate George Ashburnham usually stayed at Pembrey House, which the family had built on the slope to the north east of St Illtud's Church, Pembrey, in 1823 and which has since been demolished. The house was occasionally let, with rooms being reserved for family use. However, in the 1891 census, Lord Ashburnham, 5th Earl, is recorded as staying at the Ashburnham Hotel.

== Relationship with the Mansel family ==
After the death of Bridget Vaughan’s stepfather, William Ball, in 1701, Court Farm was leased to Rawleigh Mansel, of Llangunnor Parish. He was High Sheriff of Carmarthenshire in 1679 and, according to The Red Dragon periodical (1886), he went to live at Court Farm:

“thoroughly repairing that old mansion for the purpose, and lived there for three or four years, and died there on 27 November 1702 in his 73rd year”

His grandson, Rawleigh Dawkin Mansel, who was High Sheriff in 1730, then lived as tenant at Court Farm.

During the tenancy of Rawleigh Dawkin Mansel the house was divided into two separate living sections and accommodated two separate families. Walls were added or removed, several doors and windows were blocked and new ones opened, additional stairs were fitted and at least two attic rooms were added. During this period David Thomas (1738/39-1788) was born at Court Farm.

Rawleigh Dawkin Mansel was High Sheriff for Carmarthenshire in 1730 and died ‘under the agonizing pains of the Gout’ in his 44th year in 1749. Thereafter, Court Farm was home to several Ashburnham agents, stewards and other estate officials.

On Kitchen’s map of 1701 Court Farm is clearly marked as: ‘Court, Mansel, Esq.’

== Edward Lluyd’s visit ==
In 1700, Edward Lluyd, a graduate of Jesus College, Oxford, keeper of the Ashmolean Museum, Oxford, and a noted Celtic scholar and antiquary, visited Pembrey Court and reported as follows:-

“Penbre Court, ye Seat formerly of the Butlers and afterwards of the Vaughans, and now belonging (in right of his Lady) to [William] Ball, Esqr, whence it descends to my Ld Ashburnham’s Lady………..Diwlais Brook divides this parish from Llan Elhi, springing at Croslaw Mountain and falls into the sea………Here are 2 lakes close together called Swan Pool where there are plenty of Eels, and in the Winter store of Fowls such as Ducks and Teal, sometimes wild Swans or Elks and wild Geese. The adjoining one, stored with Turbot, Bret and Sole. They take here a large sort of fish called Friers or Monk fish (in Hereford, Gloucester, and Worcester, whither they carry them, Soucing Fish) about May, June and July. This Pool (or Pools for both may be called one) is called Swan Pool because the Lord of the manor (Mr Ball) has thereon about 40 Swans. Before the hard frost there were about 80, which all died to 6."

Swan Pool was located near Towyn Mawr, and has since been drained. Appropriately, the location is now known as Swan Pool Drain.

A picturesque pond, located near to the house, and close to the Mountain Road, was also drained in about 1937.

== Relationship with the Thomas family ==
David Thomas was born at Court Farm during the tenancy of the Mansels, when the house was divided into two. He was a gifted, but unqualified, bone setter from an illustrious family practising bone setting, and is buried in St Illtud's Church, Pembrey. The Thomas family proved to have other talents, and many vocations. Three generations are listed in the Church's registers as farmers, butchers, shopkeepers, and shipowners of vessels that traded from Pembrey, Old Harbour.

On 24 July 1843, John Thomas, a farmer, and David Thomas, a shopkeeper, jointly registered a brigantine of 185 tons burthen known as the "ELIZA" at Llanelli. Its master was John Thomas junior and it traded to Liverpool, Malta, Ancona, Venice and as far as San Francisco, where the whole crew deserted the ship to join the Californian gold rush. Consequently, the ship was anchored, with hundreds of others, in San Francisco harbour for several years. She was later sold, along with many other ships, by the United States Marshall.

John Thomas also owned a sloop of 29 tons burthen called the "SEDULOUS", which was built in Cardigan and registered at Llanelli on 15 February 1842. Its registry was cancelled on 19 March 1842.

Hugh Thomas, together with some other investors, owned the "MARGARET JANE", a vessel built at Pwllheli in 1850, and whose registry was cancelled on 13 December 1865.

In 1831, Mr. Edward Driver, a surveyor, made a "Survey and Valuation of the Manor of Pembrey and Estate" on behalf of Bertram Ashburham. At this time, Court Farm comprised 194 acres plus 12 acres (49,000 m^{2}) of marshland. The tenant was recorded as John Thomas (later succeeded by his son Hugh) who paid a yearly rent of £88.10s. John Thomas occupied a part of the Mansion, whilst a Mr. T.E. Biederman occupied the other part. Mr. Driver reported as follows:

"One portion of the Old Court House is occupied by Mr. Biederman. The other portion comprises a very good large kitchen, small cellar, old Entrance Hall, a parlour not inhabitable but now undergoing repairs and filling up, and a new staircase has been lately made to lead to two new formed bedrooms. At the back of the House is a range of offices comprising (besides some held by Mr. Biederman) a dairy and a cheese loft. A newly erected cowhouse and stable with slated roof, and enclosed yard. Adjoining the House is a good barn with cowhouse; coach-house at the end, hereafter described, and held by Mr. Biederman; a stock yard with cowhouse, and another barn, slated, and a lean-to carthouse, thatched, at the back…"

Later in the survey, Mr. Driver wrote:

“Part of the Court House and buildings, heretofore generally used by the Agent, but for the last 3 or 4 years was occupied by his brother and T. E. Biederman. The buildings comprise the old Court House, and was formerly a good residence; it is stone built with slated roof; part has been kept for the accommodation of the Agent to the Estate, and this is now occupied, and has so been for 3 or 4 years by Mr T. E. Biederman, and consists of the large principal room, now subdivided, leaving a good Parlor, a bedroom without a fireplace, and a passage leading to another bedroom; another bedroom, kitchen, and small scullery, and a small bedroom for a servant; a cellar under a part; coalhouse and room over; and a coach-house at the end of the barn; a stable in two divisions for four horses: all the above occupied by Mr. Biederman.”

During its early period, Court Farm had a high, open-trussed roof, visible from the floor of the main hall and of an elaborate design, with double roll and hollow moulding. Bredwardine Court and Porthaml Mansion, two other ancestral homes of the Vaughans, have similar surviving roofs. However, part of the original roof of Court Farm was lowered and flattened during alterations made during the 19th century, and the carved ornamental detail of the original trussed roof was lost. In addition, the original stone tiles, which needed a more steeply pitching roof, were replaced with Caernarvon slates (as reported in Mr. Driver’s survey), and the roof valleys were finished off with lead flashing.

The 1878 Ordnance Survey map gives the first known ground plan of Court Farm, this shows the original Vaughan L-shaped structure, with two wings enclosing a courtyard in the rear. Nearby, on the south side, is the barn. A large enclosed garden is outlined, together with Court Wood, said to have been planted by the Vaughans.

A Tithe Schedule and map dated 7 June 1839 shows Court Farm with 209 acres (0.85 km^{2}), a slight increase in landholding since the survey of Mr Driver, with Mr. John Thomas still the tenant. The Thomas family were tenants of Court Farm from 1738 to 1902, and most of their baptisms, marriages and burials are recorded in the registers of St Illtyd Church, Pembrey.

The Tithe Schedule also includes the names of all the surrounding fields, including Clos Edwin, Wedlanis, Abel Dawnsi, Hunting Knap, and Mumble Head. Two fields, Garreg Lwyd and Maes Graig Lwyd, may have had a religious origin.

== Industrial activities ==
It was during the ownership of the Pembrey Estate by the Ashburnhams that trial workings for coal were made. These proved to be successful and a number of levels and pits were opened in Coed y Marchog (Knight’s Wood) and Coed Rhial (Royal Wood) on the western slope of Pembrey Mountain.

Management of the colliery was undertaken from an office at Court Farm and the coal was carried by packhorse to the estuary of the River Gwendraeth and to the Burry Inlet, from here it was shipped to the west of England and Ireland.

The second Earl Ashburnham, impressed by the success of a canal built by Thomas Kymer in the Gwendraeth valley, decided upon a similar scheme for his Pembrey colliery. Kymer’s Canal was built between 1766 and 1768 in order to carry coal from pits and levels at Pwll y Llygod and Great Forest (near Carway) to a place of shipment on the Lesser Gwendraeth river near Kidwelly.

The Ashburnham canal ran from the foot of Pembrey Mountain to the Gwendraeth estuary and its aim was to improve the transport of coal from the Pembrey colliery to the sea. The plan initially encountered opposition from colliers, whose ponies used to do the job, but by 1796 work on the canal had begun below Coed Farm, close to the Llandyry-Pinged road. By 1799, the canal had extended across the Kidwelly-Pembrey road, near to Saltrock Farm, and by the end of 1801 it had reached the sea at Pill Towyn, a creek running in from the south bank of the Gwendraeth Fawr river. Two shipping places were built on the canal, one of them at Pill Ddu, and the total length of the canal was about two miles (3 km). Flat terrain meant that there were no locks, and in 1805 a short branch was constructed towards Ffrwd when new levels were opened in Coed Rhial. The entrance to Pill Ddu was deepened in 1816 and a dry dock was added in 1817. By 1818, however, the colliery had become exhausted and the canal became redundant.

In the returns of Owners of Land in 1873, Bertram Ashburnham is shown as having substantial estates in Wales, with 5,685 acres (23.01 km^{2}) producing an estimated annual rental of £3,547 in Carmarthenshire, and 1,881 acres (7.61 km^{2}) producing an estimated annual rental of £1,963 in Breconshire. In Sussex, the family seat, 14,051 acres (56.86 km^{2}) produced £13,069.

== Sale of the Ashburnham estate ==
Bertram Ashburnham died on 22 June 1878 aged 80. His eldest of seven sons, also named Bertram, succeeded as fifth Earl and actively participated in the development of industry in Pembrey. He died in 1913 leaving an only child, Lady Mary Cathleen Charlotte Ashburnham. The title thus passed to his younger brother, Thomas, the sixth and last Earl of Ashburnham, who had married Maria Elizabeth Anderson of Fredericton, New Brunswick, Canada in 1903.

George Ashburnham had taken out a mortgage on his Welsh estates in 1824 for £19,403,4s, 6d after he had freed the Welsh properties from entail on certain leases. By 1897 the mortgage debt on the Welsh properties had increased to £87,600, as the loan had not been repaid on its due date. In order to repay the loan, the Porthaml estate was sold in 1913 and the Pembrey estate in 1922. Thomas Ashburnham died without issue on 12 May 1924, leading to the extinction of the Ashburnham title.

Court Farm was tenanted by the Thomas family until around 1902. After that, William Bonnell (senior), and his family, were tenants. The house once again became a single dwelling. The Bonnell family farmed Court Farm until August 1922, when the whole of the Ashburnham Estate was sold. The sale was a major local event. The Ashburnhams had, for 245 years, controlled much of Pembrey Parish, and been intimately involved in turning it into a centre of industry. At the auction Mr William Bonnell (senior) purchased Penllwyn Uchaf Farm and thereafter vacated Court Farm.

Court Farm was advertised for sale by auction on 14 September 1929, subject to tenancy, and plans could be inspected at the auctioneer's office or the local butchers. Mr James Butler of Treorchy bought Court Farm at the auction. The Manor was then let to the family of Mr Sidney Thomas. They remained as tenants after the death of Mr Butler, in 1937, and the purchase of the Manor by Mr Charles Harding from the Links, Pembrey.

Mr Harding bought Pembrey Court as a business proposition. He developed the Garreg Lwyd quarries, located on Court Farm land, as a brickworks, and used material from the quarry for his brick mixture. The brickwork project failed when the brick making machinery ran into technical difficulties. Probably as a result of these activities, a large front section of the quarry collapsed.

== Ownership by the Bonnell family ==
In 1942, Mr Harding sold Court Farm to William Bonnell (junior), who lived at Penllwyn Uchaf farm. However, the Thomas family remained as tenants until about 1948, after which Court Farm was left empty. Mr William Bonnell (Junior) continued to live at Penllwyn Uchaf Farm until his death in January 1962 and during this time Pembrey Court was used for storage. After William Bonnell's death, Court Farm passed to his younger brother, Mr Owen Bonnell.

During the 1970s, Court Farm remained unoccupied and thieves twice stole the lead flashings from the roof. After the first theft, Mr Owen Bonnell replaced the lead, but after the second theft he could see little point in replacing it again. It was at this stage that the structure of the house began to deteriorate. Nevertheless, in 1972, he appointed Messrs, Peter Howell and Donald Jones, Architects, of Uplands, Swansea to apply for grant aid from the Historic Buildings Council. The Marquis of Anglesey and representatives of the Historic Buildings Council visited Court Farm in order to assess the property for grant aid, but their report to the Secretary of State for Wales pointed out that the property was beyond repair and so a grant was refused.

Owen Bonnell died in January, 1976 and Court Farm was inherited by his nephew, John Bonnell Davies, who was born at Court Farm. He is the present owner and lives in Pembrey.

== Community interest in Court Farm ==
In 1972, the possibility of saving Court Farm was first put forward to the former Carmarthenshire County Council, but it was believed that the building had deteriorated too far and would cost an estimated £50,000 to put right. Considerable theft and vandalism left the property in a badly damaged condition, and so a planning application was made by the owners for consent to demolish the building. On 23 October 1980, Llanelli Borough Council refused the application for the following reasons:

~ [Court Farm] is a Grade II Listed Building of special architectural and historic interest, which is capable of renovation, rehabilitation and use, which would ensure its future conservation; and

~ in line with national policy, the Borough Council is disposed not to grant consent for the demolition of Listed Buildings which are capable of preservation or conservation.

Despite the decline in the fortunes of Court Farm, local concern for the building remained strong, as evidenced by the publicity in the local press. The late Mr John Evans, of Erw Terrace, Burry Port, who was a member of Carmarthenshire Antiquarian Society, commenced a campaign to save Court Farm and. in August 1981, a Court Farm Committee was established. The Committee requested that the Borough Council place a compulsory purchase order on the building and plans were formulated to restore it and develop it as a museum, in a £100,000 project phased over 3 years. Unfortunately, the plans suffered a setback when solicitors representing the owners refused to accept a valuation figure of £4,000 for the 1.8-acre (7,300 m^{2}) site.

On 19 October 1984, another application was made to demolish Court Farm, but the application was refused. The refusal notice, issued on 18 July 1985, stated that demolition was considered premature, due to the Borough Architect’s museum feasibility study.

By 14 November 1984, the Western Mail newspaper was reporting on the proposed 48-hour fast of Mr John Evans. The planned fast was the "ultimate threat" if demolition were to come about and "would be a last resort gesture".

In his campaign to save the building, Mr Evans wrote to the former Lord Chancellor, Lord Elwyn Jones (a native of Llanelli), to the Archbishop of Wales, the Archbishop of Canterbury, Llanelli Borough Council, Dyfed County Council, the Welsh Office, the Welsh Development Agency, Members of Parliament, Government Ministers, various trusts and influential academics. Letters of support were received from the Prince of Wales, who was reported to be pleased that efforts were being made to save Court Farm, and a letter of support was also received from Professor Sir Glanmor Williams.

By 1985, local concern was such that funding was made available for a feasibility study for the property. Cadw generously offered a grant of 50% towards the cost of preparation of the study and the balance came from Llanelli Borough Council. The feasibility study concluded that Court Farm was worth retaining on the basis of :-

- its uniqueness in the district and probably Wales, particularly in a locality predominantly shaped by the Industrial Revolution;

- its rich variety of architectural features within a single building;

- virtually no examples of medieval or Tudor settlement remain in the district; and

- the extent of local interest and concern over the future of the property, which has long formed part of the local history and character of the village of Pembrey.

On 30 August 1985, Llanelli Borough Planning Officer, Mr Clive Davies, stated that the ultimate step of demolition would not be justified until the results of the feasibility study were known. Apart from Mr Evans and Cadw, others who objected to demolition included the Royal Commission on Ancient and Historic Monuments in Wales, Dyfed Archaeological Trust, Llanelli Civic Society and Pembrey Community Council.

In November 1985, the Reverend W. Roberts of Burry Port wrote to the Western Mail Civic Pride Competition arguing for the preservation of Court Farm, and concluded with the following call to action:

"Summing up, the ancient St. Illtud’s Church remains; the notorious wreck-strewn and beautiful Cefn Sidan Sands remain; the third part of the trinity must also remain. In reality, the neglect of the ancient monument is a local and national scandal. Court Farm must be restored."

Meanwhile, plans by Llanelli Council to restore Court Farm had stalled because the asking price remained too high. On 27 June 1987, Mr John Evans urged the Secretary of State for Wales, Mr Peter Walker, to take over the planned restoration, fearing that otherwise the plans would come to nothing. By this stage, the proposed Court Farm museum was in jeopardy because of plans to develop a Heritage and Tinplate Centre at Kidwelly which is now Kidwelly Industrial Museum.

The importance of Court Farm was still recognised by Cadw, however, and in July 1987 they agreed to offer a grant to fund restoration at a rate of 60%, which was 10% above the then usual rate. Sadly, Cadw’s offer was not taken up and changes in grant regulations meant that the offer lapsed.

However, there was renewed hope when, on 29 January 1988, Llanelli Borough Council announced plans to buy the property in order to develop it as a tourist promotion and information office. Mr George Harris, estate officer for Llanelli Borough Council, stated that the situation of Court Farm would not be suitable as a tourist attraction in itself, but could be used as a base to promote tourist interest in the Llanelli area.

Court Farm remains posted as a building at risk on the web site of SAVE Britain’s Heritage and the posting attracted the interest of Cadw Sir Gaerfyrddin/Carmarthenshire Building Preservation Trust who obtained funding to conduct a fresh feasibility study, which was completed in 2003 by Davies Sutton Architecture. This architectural firm have successfully restored Sker House, a similar type of building. This Study was funded with by Cadw and the Architectural Heritage Fund. The Study established the intrinsic value of Court Farm and looked at all the options for saving the building. The Study established that the building represented an important historical resource and could be saved for a new beneficial use, with repair retaining a flexible layout, allowing fitting-out for an optimum end use. The structural engineer’s report, prepared by Mann Williams Consulting Civil and Structural Engineers of Cardiff collateral to the Study provided a structural assessment and report on the basis of an inspection carried out during February 2003. This stated that "the main walls remain reasonably plumb and stable when considering the extensive period of neglect. Replacement of floors and roof structures will reinstate the necessary support to the walls and provide a significant improvement to stability."

== Relationship with the sea ==
Court Farm has a panoramic view of Carmarthen Bay and is the only surviving Elizabethan manor house in Carmarthenshire. Before the construction of Whiteford Lighthouse, Court Farm and St Illtud's Church, Pembrey formed two of the few prominent local landmarks in the Pembrey area and so became important navigational aides. It is the seven "towering chimneys" that made Court Farm such a landmark, and both the Manor and Church are clearly marked on William Jones of Loughor’s ‘Plan or Directions for Ships to Come Safe into Burry and to Several Places of Safety to be within the Same’, made in 1757.

The Burry Inlet has always been a notoriously difficult place to navigate, due to the quickly changing course of the river and shifting sand banks. Ships crossing the Burry Bar, which is roughly on a line drawn from Burry Holms on Gower to Tywyn Sands or Cornel Mawr, near Pembrey, were crossing a treacherous area. Charts indicate that the contours of the estuary are constantly changing. As an example, in 1764 John Wesley crossed the Burry Inlet on horseback from Pembrey on his way to Oxwich, in Gower. Today, such a crossing would not be possible.

In the 17th century, Sir Walter Vaughan, conceived a life saving sea rescue scheme, and as local Member of Parliament, enthusiastically tried to get the Government to take-up his plans, to no avail.

== Wrecking rights and maritime enterprises ==
The Butlers had been granted rights to all wrecks found on the Cefn Sidan sands, and so for centuries the Lord of the manor of Pembrey had rights and privileges over the disposal of wrecks found along the coast.

Cefn Sidan was frequently the graveyard of many unsuspecting vessels, whose victims were buried in the grounds of Pembrey Church, including a relative of Napoleon's Josephine. Entries in the Pembrey Church registers record numerous burials of passengers and crew. The demand for coal, in the 19th century, led to a big increase in the number of wrecks along the coast.

Despite this close connection with the sea, when King Charles I asked Sir Walter Vaughan if he could supply the Crown with a ship of 30 tons, Sir Walter avoided the issue by claiming that Carmarthenshire was an inland county with only a few creeks. However, this did not prevent Sir Walter from acquiring possession of at least two ships at auction, after mishaps led to them running aground at Pembrey. One of these was of 60 tons burthen and known as "DOROTHY". She was registered at Burry and leased for a voyage from Laugharne to Chester, with a cargo of salt. The other ship was the vessel "HOPE", she was registered at Harborough, but was driven by a storm into the North Burry Road in June 1631, damaging the cargo of salt and leading to the desertion of the vessel by her crew. Sir Walter acquired possession of both vessels and cargoes and later assigned them to a Plymouth merchant for £500.

== Manorial dispute ==
By the end of the 18th century, uncertainty had arisen as to the exact area to which the Lord Ashburnham, at that time, the Lord of the manor of Pembrey, and Lord Cawdor, Lord of Kidwelly held rights. Both agreed that their agents and their legal advisers should be allowed to investigate their claims, and depositions were taken from a number of older local men, who indicated that uncertainties about the rights had set in during the 17th century.

The statements of Lord Ashburnham sought to claim that Lord Ashburnham’s tenants had always exercised their right to take any wreck or articles found on the shore to a recognised storage place, or even to Court Farm itself. The salvors were then granted a sum of money to cover the "salvage and expenses". It may be that such articles were stored in the barn at Court Farm. The following are two examples of the many depositions that were made in favour of the Ashburnham estate:

“1663, 8th day of June, John William Arnold, yeoman of Pembrey, aged 75, Sworn and Examined before the Court of the Steward…” he had always assumed that he had the right to claim any material from the wrecks on behalf of the “Lordship of Ashburnham until now and of late.”

“1664, 14th day of July, David William John, village of Pembrey, yeoman, four score years, Sworn and Examined before the Court of the Steward…did lay claim, title unto any of the wreck or materials that happened to be cast up by the sea upon any of the lands within the Lordship of Pembrey by Permission of the Lord of the manor and his agents.”

By 1830 the dispute had been settled amicably, without a court case, and the agreement allowed Lord Ashburnham to maintain his ancient manorial rights over the Pembrey foreshore, and Lord Cawdor to maintain his rights over the Kidwelly foreshore. The agreement document stated:

“The right of wreck upon this immediate part of the coast (Caldecott) seems not to have been distinctly exercised within living memory of man, but whenever a ship has been stranded, large parties come down from the Country, some joining the tenantry of Lord Ashburnham, and others the tenantry of Lord Cawdor, and whichever proved the stronger party took the greater share of the Prey.”

== Proceeds and sale of wrecks ==
Cargo from wrecked vessels was sometimes carried in carts to farms owned by Lord Ashburnham and, when the owner made a claim on the property, Lord Ashburnham’s agent would charge a salvage fee. The following are examples of wrecks claimed by Lord Ashburnham and listed in the 1830 agreement document:

1763 Received balance left unpaid of Wine (salvaged) sold this year, 8s. 10d. For salvage of the tobacco ship that came ashore at Pembrey, 5gns. For timber that came ashore at Pembrey, £1. 10. 0.

1764 For ‘uldge’ cast with a small supply of rum in it that came on shore £4. 10. 0.

1766 Caldecott: received for a boat taken up at Towin (in Caldecott) afterwards claimed on oath by Capt. Jones of Carmarthen, 1d.

1768 Caldecott: received the profit of 4 casks of wine, sold by auction at Towin on 15th March 1768, £17. 4. 0.

1770 Received for the salvage of a Dutch vessel, stranded on the fee farm at Caldecott, 5gns. Received for a hogshead of claret, £4. 18. 0, but deducted 5s. for carriage of it from the sand of Towin.

1776 Received of Mr. Griffith the Collector of Customs at Llanelly, the produce of the tobacco of the ship “POMPEY”, thrown on Pembrey Manor in February 1773, £83. 4. 0.

There are also occasional accounts in Ashburnham documents of sales of wreck found on the Pembrey sands:

"Account of wreck sold by William Davies for the Right Honourable the Earl of Ashburnham – collected from Pembrey Manor (The Court).

September 1804 To piece of elm, timber sold, being 8 cwts. and a half at 2s. 0. 17s 0

August 1805 To an old cannon sold to Mr Morgan at 4 @ 2/6 10s 0

Received from Steven Jones for use of the storeroom at Court to put the late wreck £1. 1s. 0

Eventually, all wrecks became the sole responsibility of the Receiver of Wrecks and Droits and it was his prerogative to dispose of a wreck, and its cargo, by auction, or any other suitable means. By this time, all ships from the Pembrey area were registered with the Register of British Ships at the port of Llanelli, and each ship was issued with a certificate of registry and details of the vessel were entered in the Register.

== Looting ==
There were reputed to be many wreckers in the Pembrey area. "Mat of the Iron Hand", who had lost a hand and boasted an iron hook, used to tie lanterns to the sheep grazing on the headlands during a winter storm to draw vessels into shore. One day, these false lights lured a ship onto the rocks before Sir Walter Vaughan could get the boats of his sea rescue crew out to save them. It was said that Mat's custom was to kill all survivors, so that there could be no witnesses. One swimmer that he allegedly despatched turned out to be John Walter Vaughan, the eldest son of Sir Walter Vaughan. As Mat had been imprisoned, over the years by, Sir Walter, he took his revenge by cutting off the young man's hand. As he did so, he noticed that he was wearing a gold signet ring with the well-known Vaughan crest of the three boys' snake-entwined heads, given to John Walter on attaining his majority. This was the private seal of the family. Mat was subsequently hanged.

== Manorial hedgerows and woodland ==
In 1979 a group of Carmarthenshire Antiquarian Society members carried out some hedge counting on Court Farm land. This involves counting the number of different tree species in alternate 30m lengths of hedgerow. Each species in the hedge approximates to one hundred years.

A narrow strip of land near the Court, known as the "Narrow Yard" (Llathed Fain, in Welsh) was traditionally granted, or leased, by the Lord of the manor to a favoured yeoman, who quickly delineated his property with a surrounding hedge. At Court Farm, the field shapes do suggest enclosure of former "strips" or "lands" in an open field system. The Antiquarian Society found that, on average, there were five tree species per hedge, indicating an early 16th-century enclosure from open fields.

Most of the survey effort was concentrated here, and in the Kidwelly area, because of the amount of medieval, and later, documentation available for this area, which can act as a "control" check for dates obtained from species counting. The constituent manors of local lordships are described in a 1609 Survey. This covers different soils, field types, settlement patterns and tenurial customs of the Welshries and Englishries. Dr. Max Hooper, of the Nature Conservancy, pioneered this system of calculation from English hedgerows, whose antiquity was attested by similar documents, such as hedged parts of Anglo-Saxon estate boundaries delineated in the charters, medieval "assarts" or clearances in the forest or waste registered in the manorial rolls, etc. The equation between age and number of species present is due to the relative abundance of colonizing species in the immediate vicinity, and the rate at which some species can colonize existing hedges, whether planted or made by clearing woodland either side of them.

During the late 18th and early 19th centuries, a large number of oak trees were planted on the eastern slope below Garreg Llwyd Quarry. In early times the oak tree was sacred to the Druids, and in 1842 a newspaper reported that "A grand Druidic procession took place in Pembrey", although it is not clear if there is any link to the wood.

During the early 19th century, women were employed in the area to strip the bark of the oak trees, which was sent to the nearest tannery, where tannin was extracted from the bark and used in leather production.

== Relationship to St Illtud's Church, Pembrey ==
Fanciful claims have been made that a tunnel connected Court Farm with the nearby St Illtud's Church.

Court Farm used to have a large and heavy stone bowl, filled by spring water, in its grounds, which was used to water cattle for almost a hundred years by Court Farm’s tenant farmers. This was believed to be the "lost" Norman font bowl of the Church, and subsequently, the bowl was moved to the Lady Chapel of the Church in 1933, where it still remains.

== Antiquarian interest in Court Farm ==
Interest in Court Farm goes back over a number of decades. On the afternoon of Saturday, 12 September 1970 the Carmarthenshire Antiquarian Society held its final Field Day of the 1970 season, when a visit was made to the Pembrey area. The seventy members were conducted by Mr W.H. Morris of Kidwelly and Mr Brynmor Voyle of Llanelli. After assembling at Trimsaran, the party proceeded to a point on Pembrey Mountain where they paused to admire a panoramic view of Carmarthen Bay. At Court Farm Mr. Brynmor Voyle outlined the main architectural and historical features of the mansion, including its single hall-type structure. Members were, unfortunately, unable to inspect the inside of the house. The castellated barn structure in front of the mansion aroused a great deal of interest.

At St. Illtud's Church, the Reverend T.A. Jones welcomed the party and made special mention of "Butler's Window" and the hagioscope, the opening in the church tower through which lepers viewed the consecration of the bread and wine at the altar. Members then inspected the parish registers, dating from 1700 and the memorial to families such as Rees of Cilymaenllwyd, Mansel of Stradey, Vaughan of Trimsaran, Thompson of Glyn Abbey and Wedge of Goodig.
