= Newcastle Castle, Bridgend =

Medieval castle in Bridgend, Wales

Coordinates: 51°30′32″N 3°34′59″W

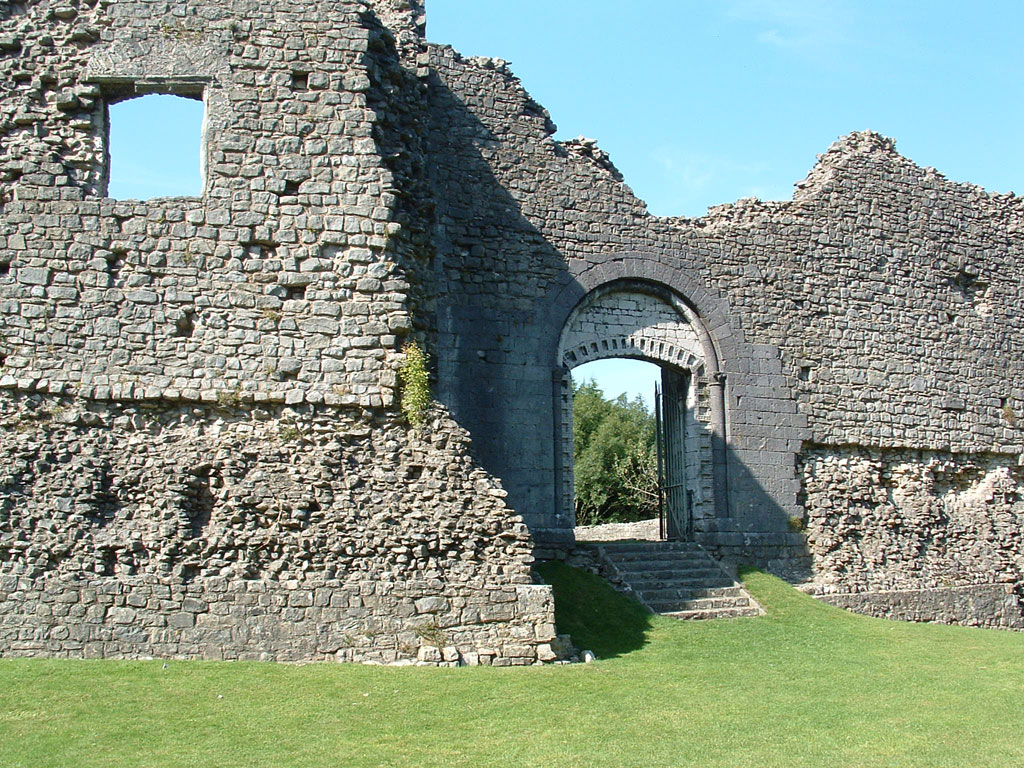
Newcastle Castle, Bridgend

Newcastle Castle (Welsh: Y Castell Newydd) is a medieval castle located on Newcastle Hill, Newcastle, overlooking the town centre of Bridgend in Glamorgan, South Wales. It was originally believed to date from 1106 when a ringwork was created at the site by the Norman baron Robert Fitzhamon. Some of the fine stonework survives, but today the castle is ruinous.

== History ==
Newcastle Castle was initially constructed as a ringwork 1106 by William de Londres, one of the legendary Twelve Knights of Glamorgan, as part of the Norman invasion of Wales. William de Londres was a knight loyal to the Norman baron Robert Fitzhamon and the Newcastle defences marked the most western extent of Fitzhamon's lordship. It is one of three castles built by the Normans in the area at the time, the others being Coity Castle and Ogmore Castle.

The defences were strengthened either by William Fitz Robert, 2nd Earl of Gloucester, shortly before his death in 1183 or by Henry II who took over the lordship of Glamorgan on William's death. The additional works had the construction of a 2-m-thick curtain wall which surrounded a courtyard which was 40 m in length. The main reason behind these new defences was believed to be a response to the uprising in Glamorgan led by the Welsh Lord of Afan, Morgan ap Caradog. Henry died in 1189, and the ownership of Newcastle fell to Prince John, who that year handed the castle to Morgan ap Caradog. When Morgan died circa 1208, he was succeeded by his son Lleison. On Lleison's death, thought to be around 1214, the castle came into the ownership of Isabel, Countess of Gloucester, the first wife of King John. In 1217, the ownership changed again, staying briefly with the Anglo-Norman baron Gilbert Fitz Richard, who in the same year handed the castle over to Gilbert de Turberville, who preferred to continue living at Coity Castle.

== The site ==
The castle is notable for the high quality of the stonework, especially that of the Norman doorway. This is late 12th century, and was likely constructed at the same time as the high curtain walls and the two square towers which they support. Only the base of the west tower survives, but the south tower has three storeys. This was remodelled for living quarters in the 16th century, when Tudor windows and fireplaces were added.

== Visitor information ==
Newcastle Castle is under the care of Cadw. It is open free of charge throughout the year. A small parking area adjoins the site. A flight of 10 steps between the two main grassland levels restricts access for wheelchair users.

== Sources ==
- Salter, Mike (2002). Castles of Gwent, Glamorgan and Gower. Malvern: Folly Publications. ISBN 1-871731-61-5.

== See also ==
- List of castles in Wales
- List of Scheduled Monuments in Bridgend
- List of Cadw properties
- Castles in Great Britain and Ireland
