= Arnold le Boteler =

Norman squire

Arnold le Boteler or Arnold Butler, was a late 11th and early 12th century Norman squire with a penchant for property development. He was the first recorded 'lord' of the Welsh village of Pembrey.

He acquired the tenancy of Dundryfan manor and Dunraven Castle from his lord, Maurice de Londres, around 1128 for services rendered. He is credited with building the first stone building on the site. The annual rent for the manor was three golden cups of wine. Le Boteler also established the manor house and estate which is now known as Court Farm, Pembrey during the reign of William the Conqueror.

His service to Maurice de Londres, for which he received the manor, was the defence of Ogmore Castle while the lord defended against Welsh insurgence, led by Princess Gwenllian ferch Gruffydd, at Kidwelly Castle.

The le Boteler/Butler family crest can be seen in plasterwork in St. Illtud's Church, Pembrey. The le Boteler estate passed to the Earl of Ashburnham.
