= Kidwelly Priory =

Former Benedictine monastery in Carmarthenshire, Wales

Coordinates: 51.7368°N 4.3065°W

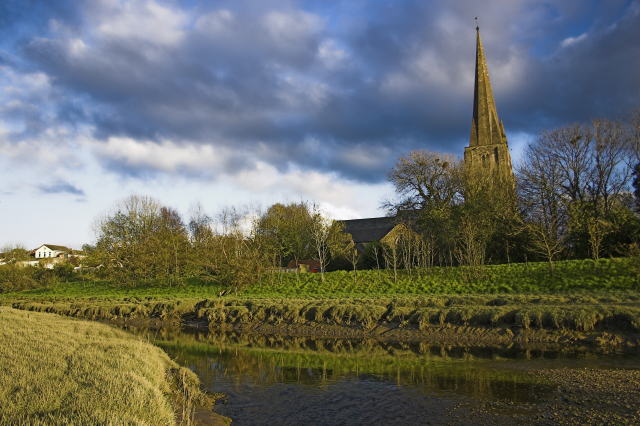

Kidwelly Priory was a Benedictine house in Kidwelly (Cydweli), Carmarthenshire, Wales. It was founded in about 1110 by Roger, bishop of Salisbury (d. 1139), a trusted supporter of England's King Henry I.

== Site ==
Physically, the priory was established in Carmarthenshire on the south side of the Gwendraeth Fach River while Kidwelly Castle and the town, which preceded the priory, were located on the north side.

The extent of the priory’s holdings can be discerned from the fact that what were once called "the priory fields" are now the gardens in Lady Street at Kidwelly.

The size of the priory could not have been large, as the number of residents at the priory was always small.

== History ==
In 1908, the vicar of Kidwelly, David Daven Jones, demonstrated how "the history of Kidwelly in the middle ages is bound up with the Norman Conquest and its consequent exactitude and elaboration in the re-adjustment of things, both civil and religious", for in the wake of the conquest of England came “the Norman Conquest of Wales.”

King Henry I, son of William the Conqueror, was on the throne of England in 1102 when he first became aware of Roger le Poer (Roger the Pauper), who had been a priest in Caen, Normandy. Seeing talent, Henry raised Roger up, making him Bishop of Salisbury, treasurer of the realm, and later justiciar. In 1106, upon the death of the Welsh prince Hywel ap Goronwy, Henry almost immediately assigned the commotes of Cydweli (Kidwelly) and Carnwyllion, both formerly in Hywel's control, to Bishop Roger, who created from them the marcher lordship of Kidwelly.

In about 1110, after the building of a motte-and-bailey castle at Kidwelly and the town growing up around it, Bishop Roger granted one carucate of land to Sherborne Abbey in Dorset, its prior, Turstin (or Thurstan), and his successors for the building of a priory. The boundaries were to extend "from the ditch of the new mill to the house of one Balba, and thence to the river, running through the alder grove, to the way and from the way as the river ran to the sea." It also included the hill of Solomon. This undertaking was made on behalf of the souls of Roger's patron, Henry I, along with his queen, Matilda of Scotland, and their sons, in addition to the souls of his family and himself.

Along with Roger, Bishop of Salisbury, the marcher lord William de Londres and, later, his grandson Maurice are bound to the history of Kidwelly in Carmarthenshire. The Londres family, who normally worked with, not against, Bishop Roger, are remembered more for their lordship of the castle rather than the priory, though William was one of the witnesses to the donation of land to Sherborne. Since William de Londres was among the Normans who undertook the Conquest of Glamorgan in the late eleventh century, his involvement in southern Wales was substantial.

After Henry I died in 1135, a disputed succession occurred between Henry’s daughter Matilda and his nephew Stephen of Blois, which led in 1138 to a civil war called the Anarchy. In 1139, the bishop lost favour with the new king, Stephen, in a quarrel about the properties of the bishop’s nephews, a result of which was that the Bishop Roger lost all of his lands, including Kidwelly, which passed to Maurice de Londres. Bishop Roger died in 1139 and, in turn, Maurice de Londres in 1166, at which time Kidwelly passed to Maurice’s brother, Thomas de Londres, and after successive generations to King Henry IV, whose mother was Blanche of Lancaster, a descendant of Lord Thomas. (Note: In his genealogy of the lords of Kidwelly, D. D. Jones indicates that John of Gaunt married Maud Plantagenet, though he actually married Blanche, sister of Maude. Both women were descendants of Thomas de Londres.)

Kidwelly Priory was dissolved in 1539 by Henry VIII. Today the parish church, St Mary's, is the only extant remnant of the priory, though it dates to the fourteenth century, c. 1320, not to the twelfth.

== Priors of Kidwelly ==
Priors of Kidwelly

- 1240 Abraham
- 1268 Gervase
- 1284 Ralph de Bemenster
- 1301 Galfridus de Coker
- 1346 Robert Dunster
- 1361 John Flode
- 1399 Philip Morevyle
- 1404 John de Kidwelly
- 1428 Robert Fyfhede
- 1438 John Cauntville
- 1482 John Sherborne
- 1487 John Henstrige
- 1520 John Whitchurche
- 1534 John Godmyston
- 1539 John Painter
