= Newcastle Castle =

Newcastle Castle may refer to one of two medieval castles in Great Britain:

- The Castle, Newcastle, in Newcastle upon Tyne, England.
- Newcastle Castle, Bridgend, a ruinous Norman castle in Bridgend, Wales.
