= Oystermouth Castle =

Castle in Mumbles, Swansea, Wales

Coordinates: 51.57645°N 4.00297°W

- Oystermouth, Swansea, Wales
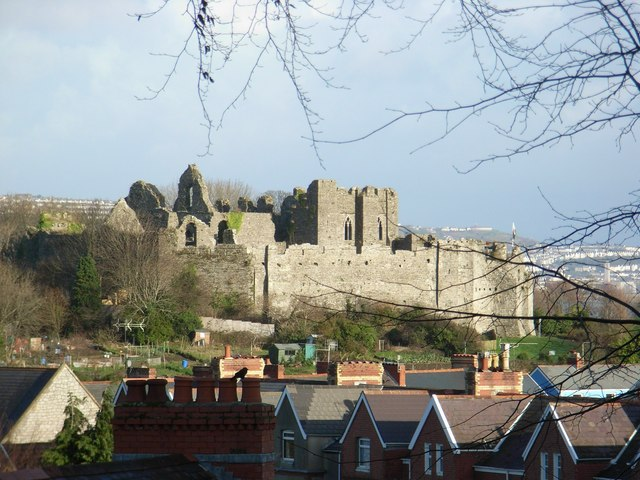
- Oystermouth Castle

Site information
- Type: Castle
- Owner: City and County of Swansea council
- Open to the public: Yes
- Condition: Ruin

Site history
- Built: 12th century
- In use: 1106 to about 1650
- Materials: Stone

Listed Building – Grade I

Oystermouth Castle (Welsh: Castell Ystum Llwynarth) is a Norman stone castle in Wales, overlooking Swansea Bay on the east side of the Gower Peninsula in the village of Mumbles.

== The early castle ==
A number of Antiquarians state that the Norman castle was built on the site of a former native fortification. Nineteenth century works by Samuel Lewis and Nicholas Carlisle both name this fortification as the "Caer Tawy" of Medieval Welsh literature. The name indicates that a Welsh fort (a Caer) was built here to guard the river Tawe long before Oystermouth or Swansea Castle were built by the Normans.

The first Norman castle was founded by William de Londres of Ogmore Castle soon after 1106 following the capture of Gower by the Normans. In 1116 the Welsh of Deheubarth retook the Gower Peninsula and forced William to flee his castle which was put to the torch. The castle was rebuilt soon afterwards, but was probably destroyed again in 1137 when Gower was once more retaken by the Princes of Deheubarth. The Londres or London family finally died out in 1215 when Gower was again taken by the Welsh under the leadership of Llywelyn the Great. In 1220 the Welsh were expelled from the peninsula and the government of Henry III of England returned the barony of Gower to John de Braose who rebuilt both Swansea and Oystermouth castles.

== In de Braose hands ==
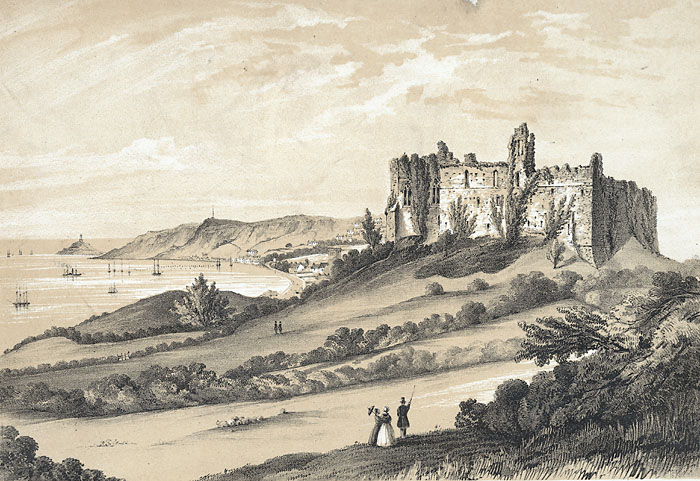
Oystermouth castle, with its village and lighthouse, 1839

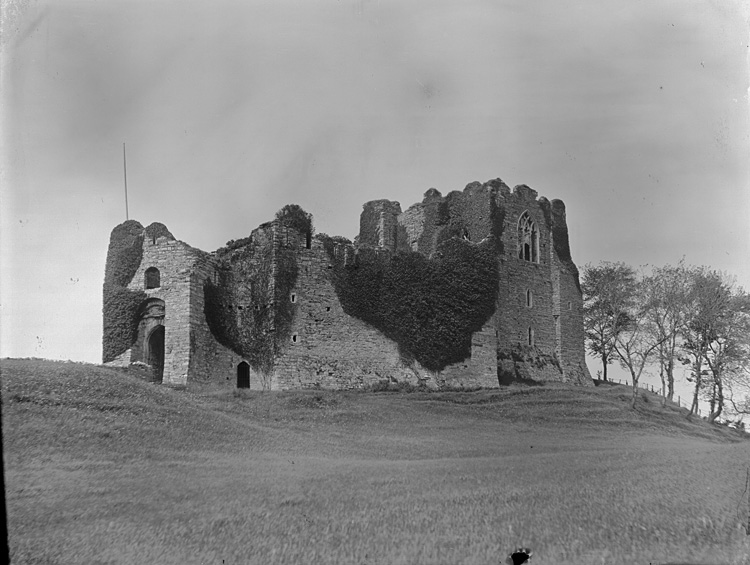
A 1910s photograph by P. B. Abery.

In the 13th century the Braose family were Lords of Gower and held the castle as part of their extensive land holdings and titles, including other castles on Gower and in the Welsh Marches. The de Braose dynasty could afford to rebuild Oystermouth castle in stone. A high curtain wall was built, internal buildings added, a chapel, basements, three storey residential buildings with fireplaces and garderobes on each floor. The castle had every residential feature necessary for living in some comfort and was also refortified cleverly. Towards the end of the century Oystermouth rather than Swansea Castle became their principal residence. Edward I paid a brief visit here in December 1284.

By 1331 the Lords of Gower were living elsewhere and the castle declined in importance in the 14th century.

The daughter of the last de Breos Lord, Aline de Breos, who improved the chapel making it one of the finest in any castle in south Wales, later married John de Mowbray, and the Lordship of Gower including the castle at Oystermouth passed to the de Mowbrays through this marriage, and then to the Herbert family, and finally the Somersets, who became successive Marquis of Worcester and finally Dukes of Beaufort.

== Decline and decay ==
After the Middle Ages, the castle gradually fell into ruin. A survey of Gower made in 1650 describes Oystermouth Castle as [a]n old decayed castle of no use, but of a very pleasant situation. It was portrayed in art in the 18th century as a picturesque ruin, and was restored by George Grant Francis in the 1840s while the castle was owned by the then Duke of Beaufort.

In 1927 the Duke of Beaufort gave the castle to Swansea Corporation; today, the castle is maintained under the responsibility of the City and County of Swansea council.

== 2000s restoration ==
In 2009 the National Assembly for Wales announced it was investing £19 million in the country's heritage sites in an attempt to boost tourism. As part of the programme Oystermouth Castle closed in 2010 while it underwent a £1 m refurbishment; it reopened to the public in July the following year.

Following the first phase of conservation works Oystermouth Castle reopened to the public in mid July 2011. The scheme includes new visitor facilities, an educational space, improvements to access and a 30-foot high glass viewing platform and bridge that leads to Alina's Chapel.

== Notable features of the castle ==
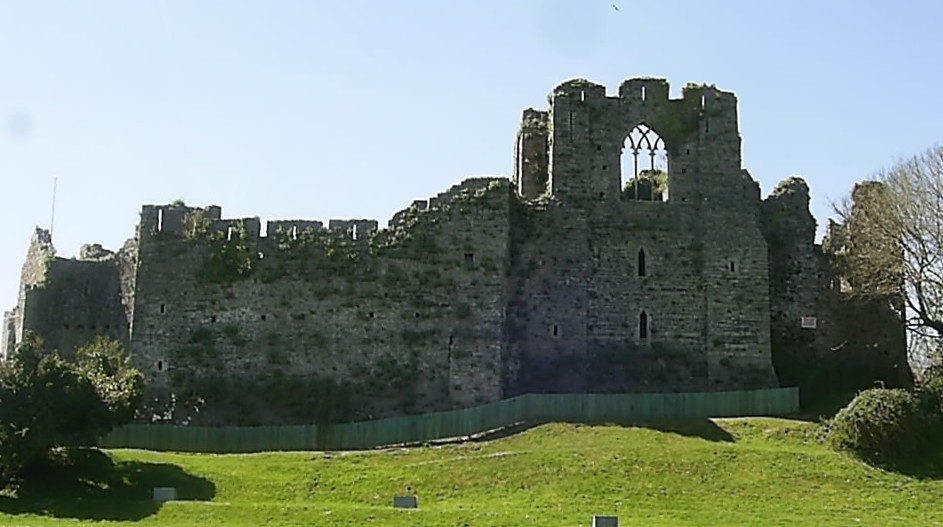
Oystermouth Castle, showing the gatehouse and the chapel window

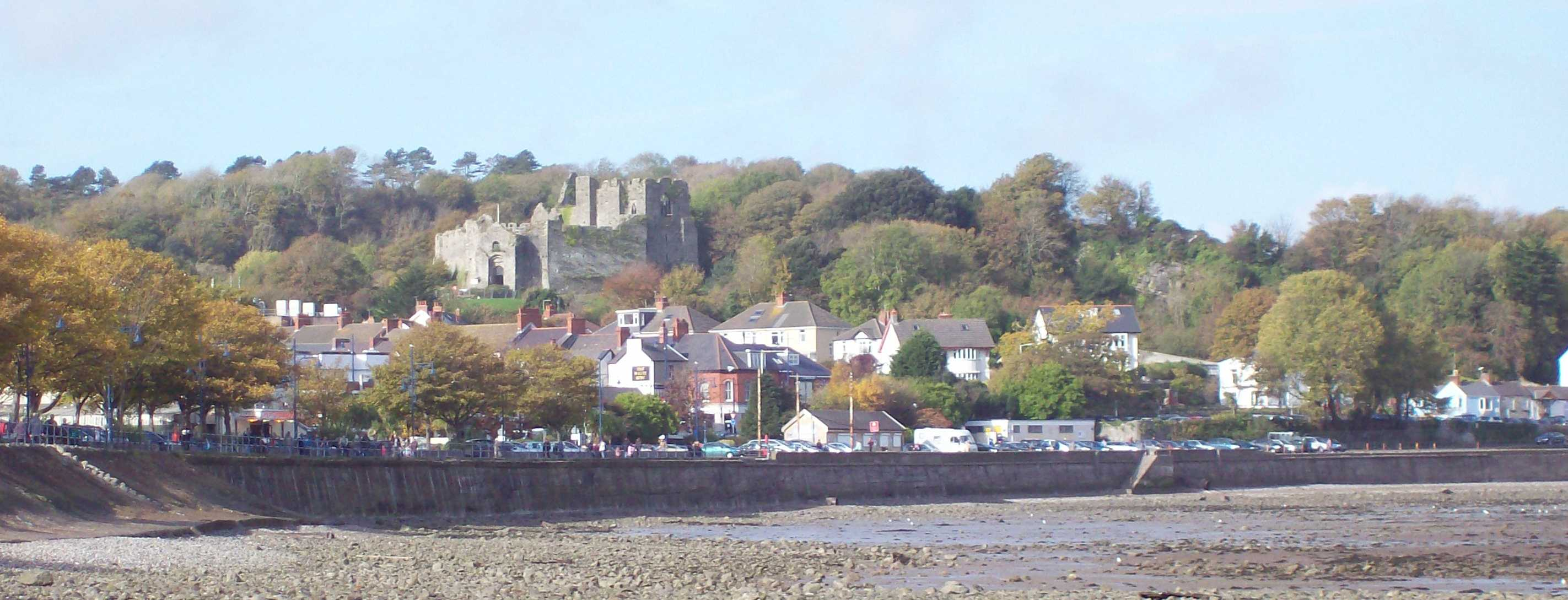
Oystermouth Castle, from the village

On either side of the entrance gate the walls curve inward, showing that at one time there were supposed to be two round towers built into the gatehouse. It is unknown whether these were ever built.

The chapel (on the second floor of the chapel block) has 14th century traceried windows. According to local tradition the chapel was built under the direction of Aline de Mowbray.

Remnants of an ornate medieval painting dating back to the 14th century have recently been found in the chapel. The surviving painting is thought to be over 700 years old and was spotted during conservation work in the historic attraction's chapel area. Exposure to the elements has taken its toll on the painting over time but expert Cadw analysis suggests it's a double-arched canopy that contains the figures of angels. Some of the clear elements of the painting that remain include a wing with multiple feathers and circular shapes that form a head with yellow hair surrounded by a nimbus. It's thought the painting is both highly important and testimony to the original design of the chapel attributed to Alina de Breos in the early 14th century that once formed part of a larger work of art.

== Namesake ==
During World War II, the Royal Navy operated the naval trawler, HMT Oystermouth Castle.

== See also ==
- Castles in Great Britain and Ireland
- List of castles in Wales
