= St Mary's Church, Kidwelly =

Church in Carmarthenshire, Wales

Coordinates: 51.73677°N 4.30642°W

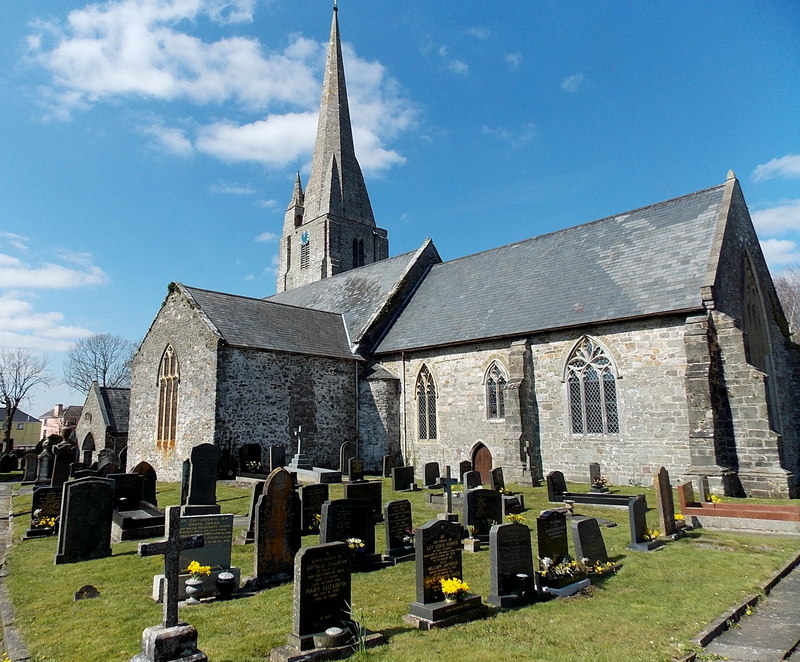
The Church of St Mary

The Church of Saint Mary is a Grade I Listed Building in the town of Kidwelly, Carmarthenshire, Wales. The church was listed in December 1963 (Cadw Building ID: 11878). Founded c. 1114 the church was burnt down in 1223 and most of the existing building dates from c. 1320 when it was a Benedictine priory. It has been listed as the largest parish church in southwest Wales, exceptional for the broach spire and fine decorative 14th-century Gothic detail.

== History ==
It is believed that prior to the Norman Conquest, St Mary's Church was originally made of wood and dedicated to St Cadog. In the early 12th century, it was granted by Roger, Bishop of Salisbury to the Benedictines to be used as a priory church. In 1223, the church burned down. This was believed to be done by supporters of Llywelyn ab Iorwerth due to the Benedictines closeness with the Anglo-Norman Marcher Lords. When it was rebuilt, it was enlarged and the Archbishop of Canterbury used it as a base from which to monitor all Welsh monasteries. However it was a poor priory with only one monk living there in 1377. This was despite there being a recorded annual tithe income of £12 6s 12d in 1291. Following the Dissolution of the Monasteries, ownership was transferred to King Henry VIII of England. From there, Henry leased it out for 21 years. The church underwent Victorian renovations between 1885 and 1889. During these renovations, a 1762 organ case originally from St Mary's Church, Swansea was installed in the church.

The church was constructed with a spire that had been regularly struck by lightning throughout the centuries with four recorded lightning strikes, each one causing damage to the spire. The church was granted Grade I listed status in 1963. The reason for it being listed was given that it was the largest parish church in south-west Wales and due to its broach spire and gothic decor. In 2023, the church gave up some of its land in front of the church for redevelopment of Kidwelly town square.

== Architecture ==
St Mary’s is an aisle-less cruciform church rebuilt c. 1320 in the Decorated Gothic style. It is constructed of rubble stone with Old Red Sandstone and oolitic limestone dressings, and comprises a four-bay nave, a three-bay chancel, a south porch, a three-storey north-west tower, and a tall octagonal broach spire. Cadw calls it “the largest parish church in south-west Wales”, praising the spire and its “fine Decorated detail”.
