= Kidwell =

Kidwell may refer to:

Persons

- Catherine Kidwell (1921–2002), American novelist and teacher
- Clara Sue Kidwell (born 1941), Native American historian, feminist and author
- David Kidwell (b. 1977), New Zealand professional rugby league player
- Peggy A. Kidwell, American historian of science and museum curator
- Wayne Kidwell (b. 1938), American jurist and politician; state attorney general and state senator
- Zedekiah Kidwell (1814–1872), American physician, lawyer, and politician from West Virginia; U.S. representative 1853–57

Other

- Kidwell Airport, Clark County, Nevada, USA
- Kidwell, West Virginia

== See also ==
- Justice Kidwell (disambiguation)
