= St Mary's Church, Coity Higher =

Church in Bridgend County Borough, Wales

Coordinates: 51°31′20″N 3°33′13″W

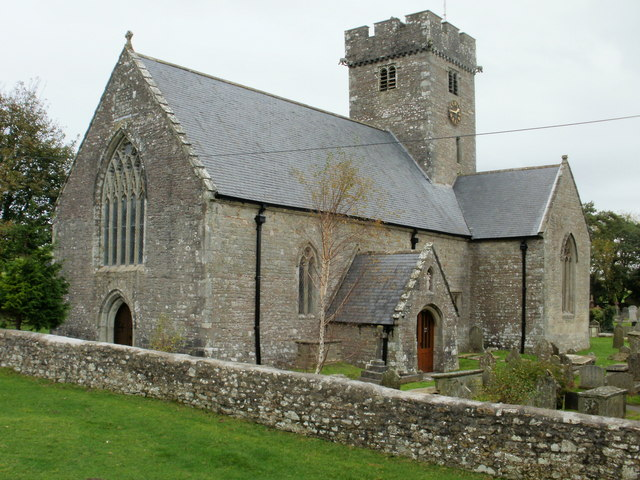
St Mary's Church, Coity Higher

St Mary's Church is a Grade I listed church in Coity Higher, Bridgend County Borough, southern Wales. The church is dated mainly to the 14th century, though significant alterations were added in the 16th century. The tower dates to the latter period. The church was extensively renovated by J. Pritchard and J.P. Seddon in 1860. The eastern stained class windows were added by Morris & Co. P.S. Webb was responsible for the patterns while the figures are the work of P.P. Marshall. Among the depictions on these windows are Christ saving Peter from drowning in the sea, Christ miraculously curing a woman, and Thomas the Doubter. The octagonal font dates to the 19th century, while the pulpit was installed in 1942. St Mary's Church became a Grade I listed building on 26 July 1963.
