= Kidwelly Flats Halt railway station =

Former railway station in Wales

Kidwelly Flats
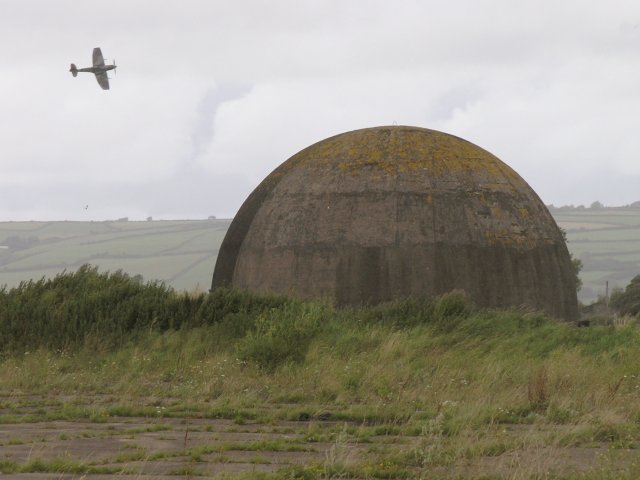
- Disused training facility and a Spitfire at RAF Pembrey

General information
- Location: Pembrey, Carmarthenshire; Wales
- Coordinates: 51.7087°N 4.2989°W
- Grid reference: SN412036
- Platforms: 2

Other information
- Status: Disused

History
- Post-grouping: Great Western Railway

Key dates
- 6 July 1941: Station opened
- 11 November 1957: Station closed
Location

Kidwelly Flats Halt railway station served the Royal Ordnance Factory (ROF) and RAF Pembrey at Pembrey, Carmarthenshire, Wales between 1941 and 1957. It was on the West Wales Line.

== History ==
The station was opened on 6 July 1941 by the Great Western Railway and closed by British Railways in 1957. It was on the section of the South Wales Railway which opened in 1852 and was situated between Kidwelly and Pembrey and Burry Port stations. Lando Platform or Halt station was also located between Kidwelly Flats and Pembrey and Burry Port stations between 1928 and 1964.

== Infrastructure ==
The station had two platforms on a double track section of line. It partly lay beneath the road bridge and nothing now remains of the station. The station had no sidings or freight facilities.

== Services ==
The station was not open to the general public. Mostly workers arriving from the west used the station from where a bus would take them to the ordnance factory.

== Routes ==
Preceding station	Historical railways	Following station
Kidwelly; Line and station open	West Wales Line; Great Western Railway	Pembrey and Burry Port; Line and station open

== See also ==
- West Wales lines
