= Coity Castle =

Castle in Bridgend, Glamorgan, Wales

- Castell Coety (Welsh) (Note: Since 2024, Cadw, which guard and maintain the site, use the Welsh name only.)
- Bridgend, Glamorgan, Wales
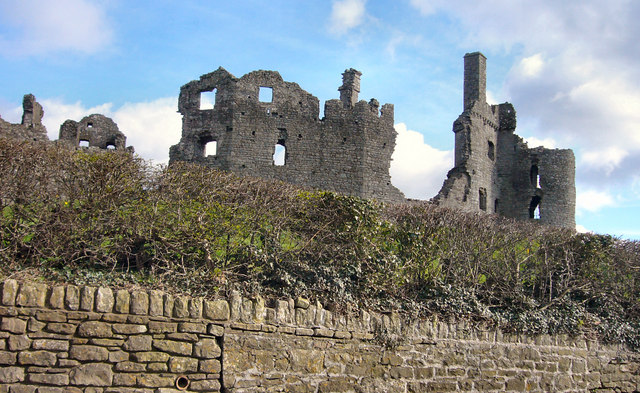

Site information
- Owner: Cadw
- Open to the public: Yes
- Condition: Ruined
- Website: Castell Coety (Cadw)

Location
- Shown within Wales
- Coordinates: 51°31′19″N 3°33′11″W

Site history
- Materials: Stone

Coity Castle (Welsh: Castell Coety) is a Norman castle in Bridgend (historically in Glamorgan), Wales. It was built by Sir Payn "the Demon" de Turberville (fl. 1126), one of the legendary Twelve Knights of Glamorgan supposed to have conquered Glamorgan under the leadership of Robert FitzHamon (d. 1107), Lord of Gloucester. Now in ruins, it stands in the community of Coity Higher near the town of Bridgend. Very close to the castle is the battlemented parish Church of St Mary the Virgin, which dates from the 14th century.

The castle is a Grade I listed building.

== History ==
=== Pre Norman Coity ===
Most Norman castles in Glamorgan (e.g. Caerphilly, Cardiff, Loughor) occupy sites which had previously been Roman forts and it is likely that the Norman castle at Coity occupied the site of an existing structure. Potential Roman military activity at the site is supported by the strategic importance of the location. A Roman fort would have controlled a number of early routes and Heol Spencer, which appears on the earliest maps of the area, has been proposed as a Roman Road because of its age, importance and remarkable straightness (which today, only deviates around the castle grounds itself).

=== First Norman Castle ===
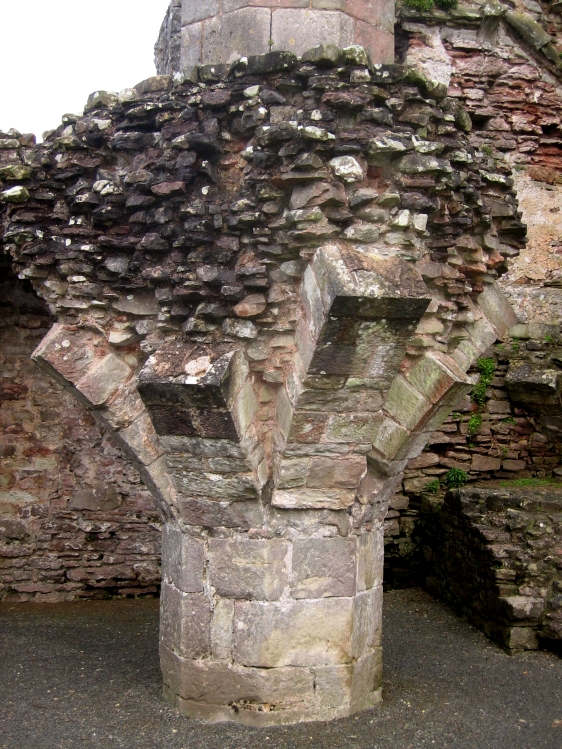
Remains of central octagonal pier for the vaults of Coity Castle

The castle began as a late 11th-century ringwork. A rectangular stone keep and the main curtain wall were added by the Normans in the 12th century, under the direction of Sir Payn "the Demon" de Turberville (fl. 1126). The three-storey keep was primarily a defensive structure.

=== 15th century ===
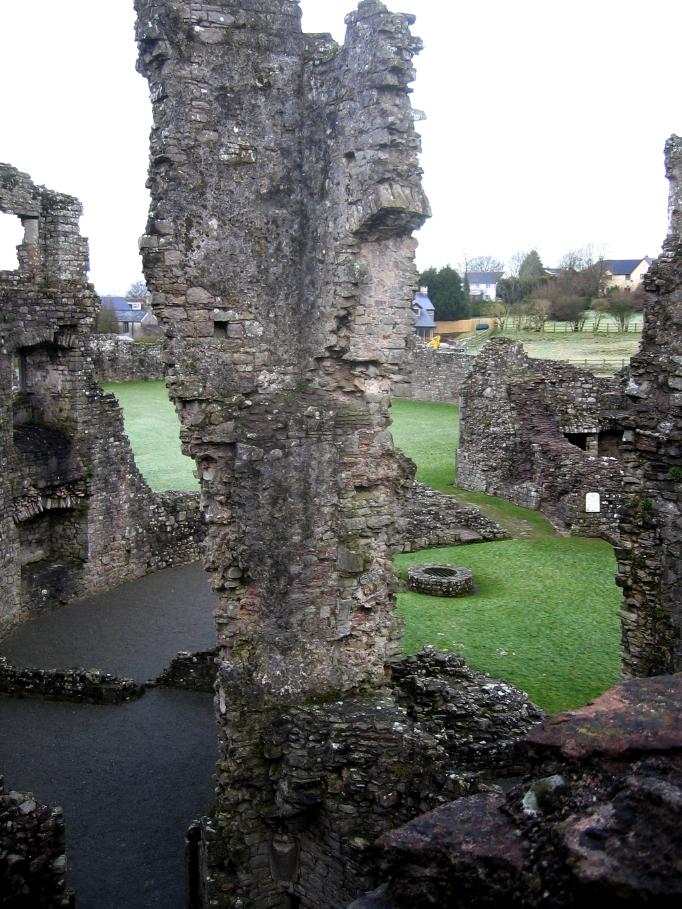
View of the remains of the ground-floor service rooms taken from the third-floor stairway of the living quarters, Coity Castle

In the early 15th century, William Gamage assisted by Sir Gilbert Denys (d. 1422) of Siston, Gloucestershire, and formerly of Waterton-by-Ewenny, besieged Coity for a month. Gamage and Denys ended up in the Tower of London for having taken the law into their own hands, from 19 November 1412 until 3 June 1413, being released after the death of Henry IV. Their action, however, proved successful in enforcing the Gamage claim to Coity. Denys's eldest daughter Joan was the wife of a certain Thomas Gamage, possibly brother of William. Another of Denys's daughters, Matilda, by his 2nd. wife, married another Thomas Gamage, son or grandson of William and Sarah, and thereby became Lady of Coity on her husband's succession, producing a son and heir John Gamage.

=== Tudor Period ===
During the 16th century, Coity Castle, by then owned by the Gamage family, underwent a complete remodelling of the living quarters, including the addition of a storey, new windows, and two chimney stacks. The principal chambers lay on the upper floors. The range of domestic apartments comprised a central first-floor hall set above a vaulted undercroft, from which it was reached by a grand spiral stair. To the west were ground-floor service rooms, probably including a kitchen, with ovens. The base of a ruined large malting kiln remains. On the far side of the range, a tower projecting from the curtain wall contained latrines. The second floor housed private apartments.

The Gamage family held Coity until the death of John Gamage in 1584.

=== Later history ===
The castle was sold in the 18th century to the Edwins of Llanharry. Through the Edwins, the Coity lordship passed to the Earls of Dunraven. Since 2024, Cadw have used the Welsh name Castell Coety in English, as part of an effort to standardise the names in both languages.

== Castle Occupants ==
It was originally built and inhabited by Payn de Turbeville and his wife, the daughter of Morgan ap Meurig, in 1092. In 1180, Sir Gilbert de Turberville, Lord of Coity, took over the castle and carried out extensive renovations. The Turberville family retained ownership of the castle until the 1400s. Sir Lawrence Berkerolles occupied the castle in the late 1300s, followed by Lady Joan Verney, a childless widow, in 1411. William Gamage, husband of the youngest Turberville sister, took over the castle in 1413. In 1584, the castle was home to Barbara Gamage and Sir Robert Sydney, Earl of Gloucester.

== Visiting the Castle ==
A small parking area is available beside the main gatehouse on the west side of the ruins, although it is not clearly marked. However, visitors can inspect the southern castle walls from the main road. To access the eastern walls, visitors can take a short path down Heol yr Eglys, a side road. This path leads to a field where the exterior of the northern walls can be viewed.

== Architecture ==
Coity Castle's inner ward is a circular area of approximately 150 feet (46 metres) in diameter. The area is protected by walls that stand up to 30 feet (9.1 metres) tall to this day. Surrounding the inner ward is a sub-circular ditched enclosure measuring 36–42 metres (118–138 ft) in diameter. Adjacent to the enclosure lies a sub-rectangular enclosure measuring 55 metres (180 feet) in an east–west direction and 36 metres (118 feet) in a north–south direction. The castle's ruined curtain walls on the western side enclose several remains of the internal buildings.

== Locomotive ==
Great Western Railway Castle Class steam locomotive number 5035 was named Coity Castle.

== See also ==
- List of castles in Wales
- List of Scheduled Monuments in Bridgend
- List of Cadw properties
- Castles in Great Britain and Ireland

== Sources ==
- The Welsh Academy Encyclopaedia of Wales. John Davies, Nigel Jenkins, Menna Baines and Peredur Lynch (2008) pg160 ISBN 978-0-7083-1953-6
