= Justice Kidwell =

Justice Kidwell may refer to:

- Homer Baird Kidwell (1911–2000), associate justice of the Supreme Court of Hawaii
- Wayne Kidwell (born 1938), associate justice of the Idaho Supreme Court
