= William de Londres =

Medieval knight who helped the Normans conquer Glamorgan

- Known for: one of the twelve knights of Glamorgan
- Born: 1070
- Died: 1126 (aged 55–56) or 1131 (aged 60–61)
- Residence: Ogmore Castle
- Heir: Maurice de Londres
- Occupation: knight

William de Londres (c. 1070–1126 or 1131) was an Anglo-Norman knight, castellan of Ogmore (Welsh: Aberogwr), under the reign of William II. He was one of the twelve knights of Glamorgan who helped Robert FitzHamon conquer the Welsh Kingdom of Morgannwg at the end of the 11th century during the Norman conquest of Wales.

== Lifetime ==
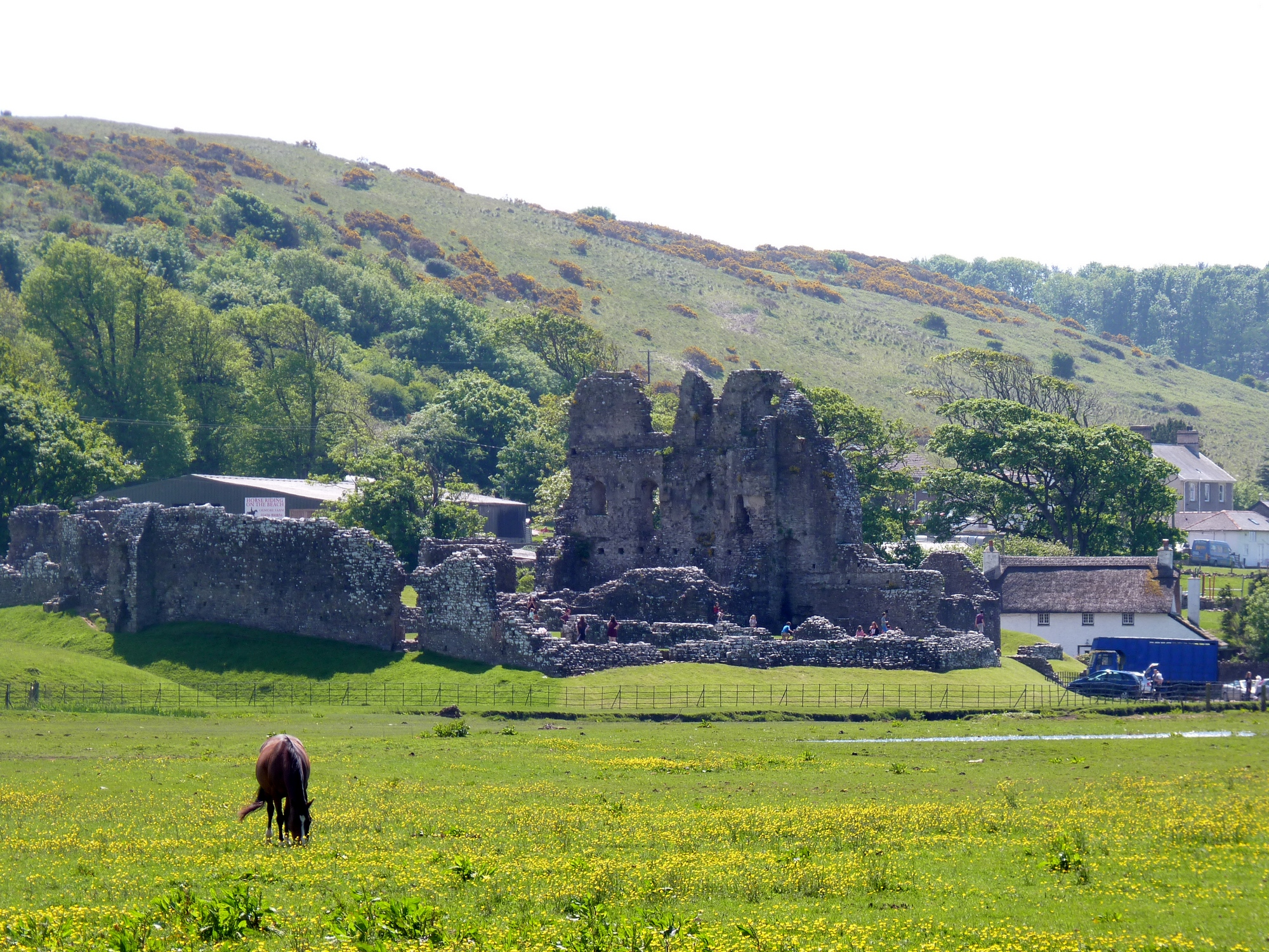
The ruins of Ogmore Castle founded by William de Londres

William de Londres was a Norman lord, and a knight. In 1091, he assisted Robert FitzHamon in the conquest of the Kingdom of Morgannwg, who gave him the lordship of Ogmore. His coat of arms was: "Sable, a lion rampant guardant, or, a bordure erm" (a gold lion on a black shield). De Londres built Ogmore Castle in c. 1100; it was constructed by 1116 and probably before FitzHamon's death in 1107. De Londres also founded Kidwelly Castle.

After 1106, he supported Henry de Beaumont in the conquest of Gower, where he built Oystermouth Castle, after being assigned the fief of Oystermouth.

By 1114, de Londres was serving at Kidwelly.

During Gruffydd ap Rhys's rebellion in 1116, William de Londres was forced to abandon Ogmore Castle, fleeing with his cattle and belongings. The Welsh ravaged the Gower, and had burned Kidwelly Castle, but Ogmore Castle survived. William de Londres' butler, Arnold, is credited with protecting it. In 1128, he was knighted Sir Arnold Butler and given the castle and Dunraven Manor.

William de Londres founded a church in Ewenny near Bridgend, which was built between 1116 and 1126. The church became Ewenny Priory under his son, Maurice de Londres.

William de Londres may have died in 1126, as his son had taken over his duties as lord and castellan of Kidwelly by then, but he may have survived until 1131. The de Londres descendants acquired lasting notoriety in Wales at the Battle of Kidwelly Castle (1136), when Maurice de Londres defeated a rebel army led by Gwenllian ferch Gruffudd; Gwenllian and her son Morgan were executed.
