= Twelve Knights of Glamorgan =

The Twelve Knights of Glamorgan were a "legendary" group of mercenaries who followed Robert Fitzhamon (d.1107), the Norman conqueror of Glamorgan. Although Fitzhamon was an actual historical figure, 16th-century historians, in particular Sir Edward Stradling, built upon the legend of a group of knights who ruled over the county in his stead. The fact that many of the knights existed during the period gave the legend credence.

== Background ==
The legend of the Twelve Knights of Glamorgan was founded by the antiquarian Sir Edward Stradling (d. 1609) of St Donat's Castle in Glamorgan. In 1561, he wrote "The Winning of the Lordship of Glamorgan out of Welshmens' Hands", describing the actions of Robert FitzHamon, the first Lord of Glamorgan, assigning to him twelve Knights who followed him from Gloucestershire to effect the conquest. Most of the knights in his list withstand modern historical scrutiny, but not however the Stradling knight himself, the ancestor of Sir Edward, whom he had believed to have been a follower of Fitzhamon. It has been more recently determined that the first Stradling in Glamorgan actually arrived later than Fitzhamon, probably originating in Switzerland.

== List of the Twelve Knights ==
An account of the Knights and of the stolen lands allotted to each by right of conquest is given in the 1591 work of Sir Edward Mansel of Margam, "An Account of the Cause of the Conquest of Glamorgan by Sir Robert FitzHaymon and his Twelve Knights".

They are as follows:

- Sir William de Londres; Ogmore, father of Maurice de Londres
- Sir Richard de Grenville (d.post-1142), younger brother of Robert FitzHamon; Neath
- Sir Payn de Turberville; Coity
- Sir Robert St. Quintin; Llanblethian
- Sir Richard Siward; Talyfan
- Sir Gilbert Umfraville; Penmark
- Sir Roger Berkerolles; St Athan
- Sir Reginald Sully; Sully
- Sir Peter le Soare; Llanbedr-ar-Lai
- Sir John Fleming; Wenvoe
- Sir Oliver St. John; Fonmon
- Sir William Stradling; St Donat's
