= Ogmore Castle =

Castle in the Vale of Glamorgan, Wales

Coordinates: 51.47995°N 3.61278°W

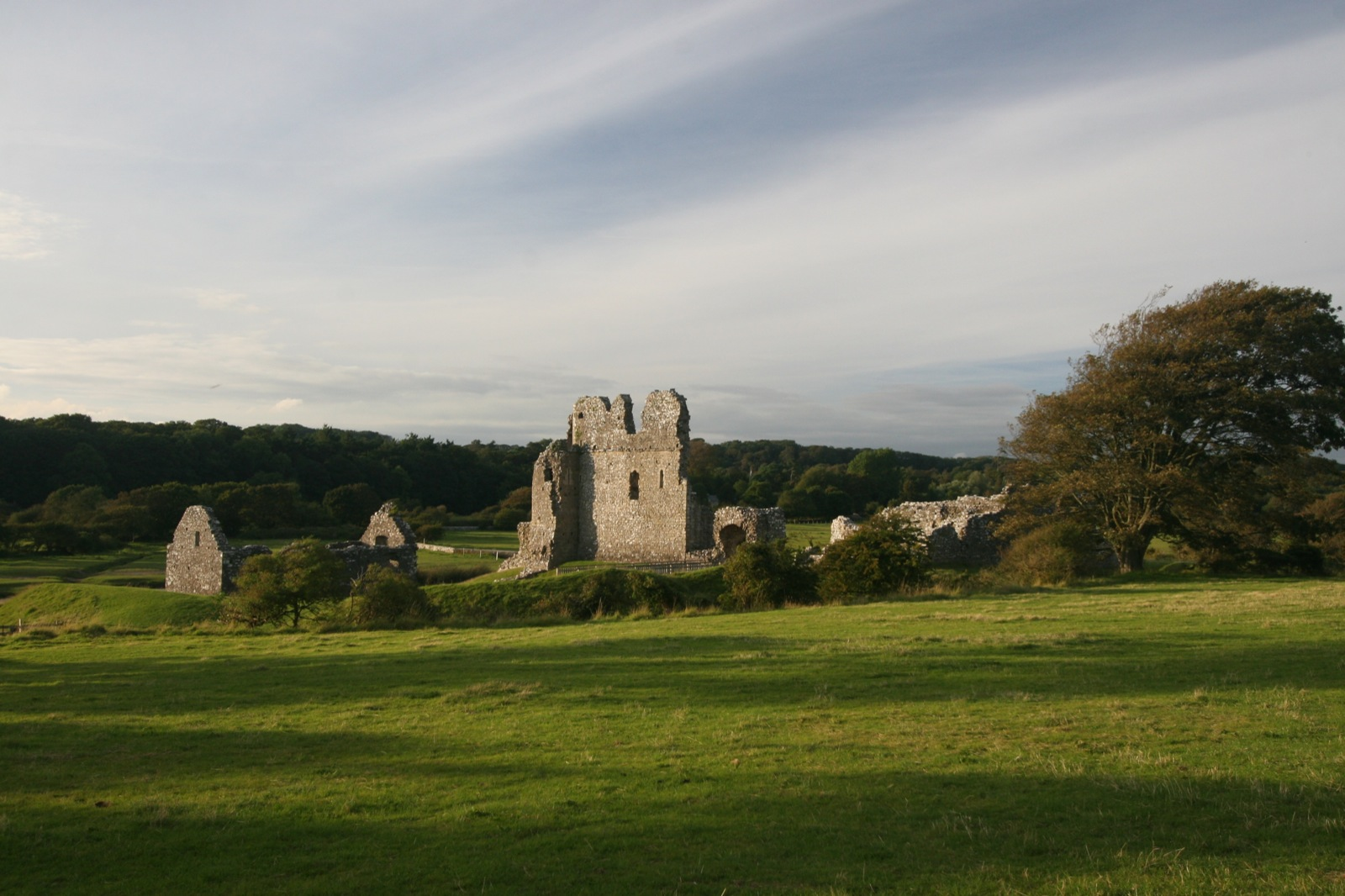
Ogmore Castle and grounds

Ogmore Castle (Welsh: Castell Ogwr) is a Grade I listed castle ruin located near the village of Ogmore in the Vale of Glamorgan, Wales, east of Ogmore-by-Sea, and south of the town of Bridgend. It is situated on the south bank of the Ewenny River and the east bank of the River Ogmore.

Its construction might have begun in 1106. Ogmore was one of three castles built in the area in the early 12th century, the others being Coity Castle and Newcastle Castle. It was in use until the 19th century for a range of purposes, including a court of justice and a prison, but is now a substantial set of remains and a local landmark.

Ogmore Castle is owned by the Duchy of Lancaster and managed by Cadw (Welsh Historic Monuments). Admission is free, with access at all reasonable times.

== Etymology ==
When John Leland wrote his Itinerary, he referred to this fortress as "Ogor Castelle". The name comes from the nearby river, the River Ogmore (Welsh: Afon Ogwr).

== History ==
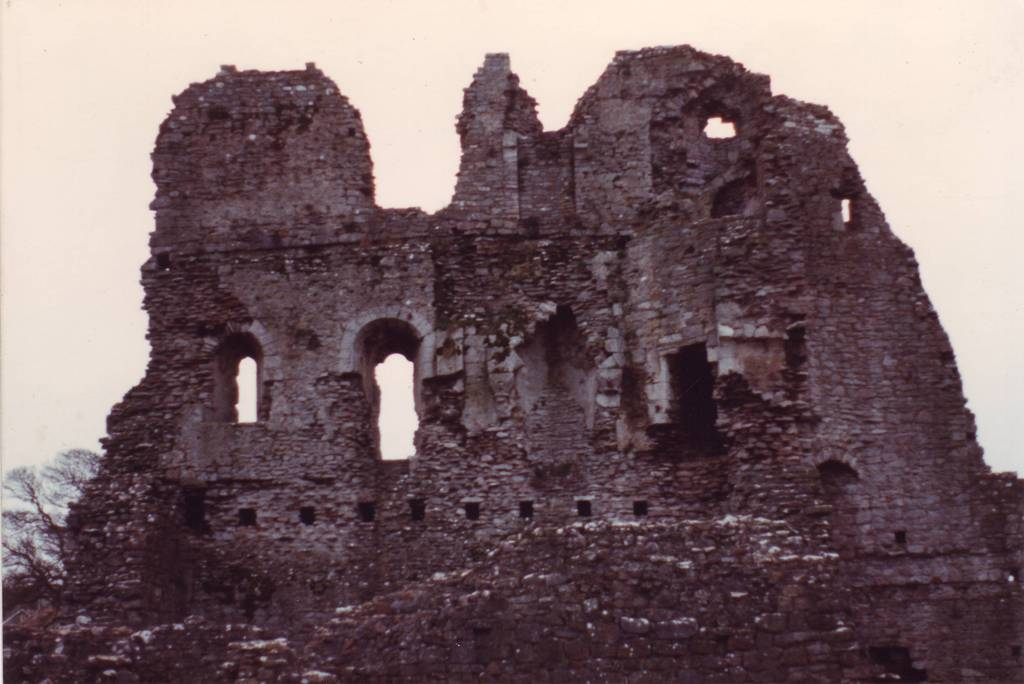
Ogmore Castle, 1987

While construction of the Norman Castle might have started around 1106, its foundation predate the Norman Invasion of Wales. Archaeological remains of earlier structures include two parts of two stone crosses. One such remnant, now in the National Museum of Wales features a wide cross stem with inscriptions on its two widest sides which read [--] EST[--] QUOD DED[IT] ARTHMAIL AGRUM DO ET GLIGUIS ET NERTAT ET FILIE SU[A], which would translate as "Be it [known to all men] that Arthmail gave (this) field to God and Glywys and Nertat and his daughter". The other inscription reads [IN NOMINE]/ DI SUM(M)I CRO/S(?) IH(ES)U(?) GENTI/ BRANCUT/ BRANCIE(?)/ [FILI ], "In the Name of the Most High God, the Cross of Jesus for the family of Brancu, (son of) Brancia".

In Caradoc of Llancarfan's The historie of Cambria, now called Wales: a part of the most famous yland of Brytaine, Caradoc wrote that the manor and castle were given to William de Londres, one of the legendary Twelve Knights of Glamorgan, by Robert Fitzhamon, the Norman conqueror of Glamorgan. In 1116, William de Londres was forced to abandon the castle when the Welsh appeared in force. His butler, Arnold, is credited with protecting the castle from the Welsh attack during the absence of William de Londres, and for this, he was knighted Sir Arnold Butler, also receiving the castle and manor of Dunraven as reward.

According to the custom of the times, the founding of a religious institution followed the acquisition of power. William de Londres, or his descendant John, built Ewenny Abbey 1 mile (1.6 km) from the castle. Also nearby was a religious place appended to Ogmore Castle by Morris de Londres or his descendant John, in 1141; Ewenny Priory is 2 miles (3.2 km) from Ogmore Castle. Because Thomas' heiress, his daughter Hawyse de Londres, had married into the Chaworth family of Kidwelly, the lands passed jure uxoris in 1298 to Henry, 3rd Earl of Lancaster, husband of Maud de Chaworth, and ownership remains in the hands of the Duchy of Lancaster to this day.

== Architecture ==
The earthworks were steeply banked and oval in shape, enclosing an area of 164 feet (50 m) in length by 115 feet (35 m) in width. The inner ward was flat and constructed of timber structures. After completion of the ringwork, the building material was stone. The windows were round-headed with Sutton stone ashlar. The first-floor great hall had an ornate fireplace.

William's son Maurice is credited with building the oblong keep; it is perhaps the oldest Norman keep in Glamorgan. Situated north of the main gateway, the keep was the first masonry building and was probably built in the 1120s. It is both the castle's tallest surviving building, and one of the oldest buildings in South Wales. Though only three of the original walls survive, their structure is characterized by irregularly shaped field stones, glacial pebbles, Lias limestone slabs, and brown mortar. Thomas de Londres replaced a timber palisade with a stone wall in around 1200.

In the early 13th century, a second storey was added that housed private apartments. Garderobes were featured on two levels and a latrine tower was part of the exterior. A well-preserved lime kiln was built over an indeterminate 13th-century structure. Subsequently, a courthouse dating to the 14th century and rebuilt in the mid-15th century, was probably the third building to occupy the same spot. The building was rectangular in shape with a simple doorway and was flanked by two chambers. Having sustained damage during Owain Glyndŵr's revolt, a new courthouse, situated in the castle's outer bailey, was built in 1454 and was in use until at least 1631.

The present-day castle remains consist of the keep and some outer walls.

== Grounds ==
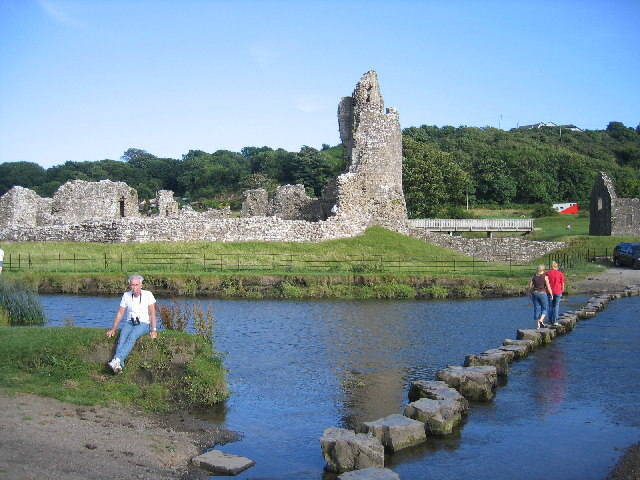
Stepping Stones

A deep, rock-cut ditch surrounded the castle grounds, which were dry except when the River Ewenny flooded the area during high tide. While the ditch that enclosed the castle's inner bailey filled at high tide, the flow was regulated by an embedded stone wall that blocked rising waters so that the interior of the castle did not flood.

Looking towards the sea from the castle ruins, the view includes sandhills that proceed up the coast nearly as far as the town of Briton Ferry. Opposite from Ogmore Castle is Merthyr Mawr, where there are two sculptured crosses; the village can be reached by a footpath from the castle.

Also near the castle are a popular set of stepping stones across the river which are a Scheduled Ancient Monument. A short distance to the southeast are several shallows filled with water that are said to have sunk spontaneously. One of them is circular, measuring approximately 7 feet (2.1 m) in diameter.

== Y Ladi Wen ==
The ghost Y Ladi Wen ("the White Lady") is said to guard the castle's hidden treasure.

In the story, a spirit was long said to wander the wider area until a man finally had the courage to approach her. When such a man eventually did so, the spirit led him to a treasure (a cauldron filled with gold) hidden under a heavy stone within the old castle tower, and allowed the man to take half the treasure for himself. However, the man later returned and took the more of the treasure. This angered the spirit, who, with her fingers turning into claws, attacked the man as he returned home. The man became gravely ill, but only died once he had confessed his greed. After that, an ailment known as Y Ladi Wen's revenge was said to befall any person who died prior to disclosing hidden treasure.

The Ladi Wen stories associated with the castle, are likely related to a tradition that the River Ogmore itself contains the spirits of those who died without disclosing the location of hidden treasures. The tradition states that these spirits may only rest when their treasures are found and thrown downstream into the river (throwing treasures upstream would not help the spirits).

== See also ==
- List of castles in Wales
- Castles in Great Britain and Ireland
