= Maurice de Londres =

Anglo-Norman lord in Wales

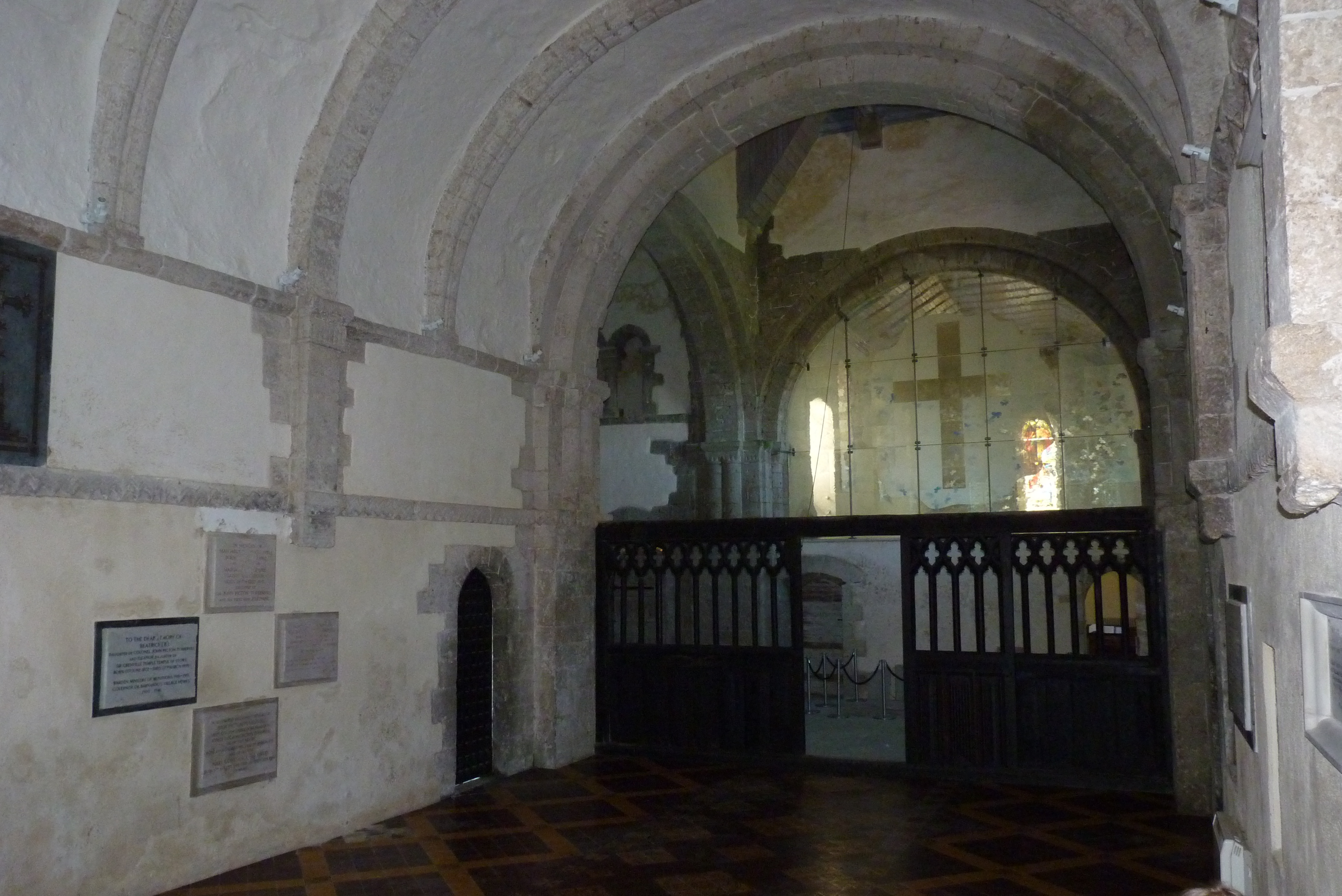
The interior of the church of Ewenny Priory donated by Maurice de Londres

Maurice de Londres (died 1166) was an Anglo-Norman noble. He was a son of William de Londres (died 1131), who was one of the Twelve Knights of Glamorgan, and his wife Matilda.

During his father's lifetime he took control of Ogmore, where he built the stone keep of Ogmore Castle in around 1126, and after the death of his father he inherited control of Oystermouth in Gower. During the Welsh uprising, after the death of King Henry I, he made a counter-attack after the defeat of the Anglo-Normans at the Battle of Loughor.

Prior to 1139 he acquired Kidwelly Castle from Roger of Salisbury and took control of Kidwelly, making him an independent lord of the Welsh Marches. In 1136 he led a Norman army into battle at Kidwelly against the native Welsh, led by Gwenllian ferch Gruffudd, with the King of Deheubarth Gruffudd ap Rhys. This was a rare example of a woman leading an army into battle in Medieval Britain. Gwenllian was captured and then beheaded on the orders of de Londres, along with one of her children.

He founded All Saints' Church, Oystermouth. He also founded Ewenny Priory in 1141 when he granted the nearby Norman church of St. Michael to the abbey of St. Peter at Gloucester (now Gloucester Cathedral), together with the churches of St Brides Major, St. Michael at Colwinston and the manor at Lampha. The church had been built in the 12th century by his father, William de Londres. The village of Ewenny grew around the priory and church. The priory of Ewenny also contains his tomb.

In around 1159 he lost control of Kidwelly to Rhys ap Gruffydd, the Welsh prince of Deheubarth.

With his wife Adeliza, he had two sons, William de Londres (died 1211) and Thomas.
