= Kidwelly Castle =

Norman castle in Carmarthenshire, Wales

- Castell Cydweli
- Carmarthenshire, Wales
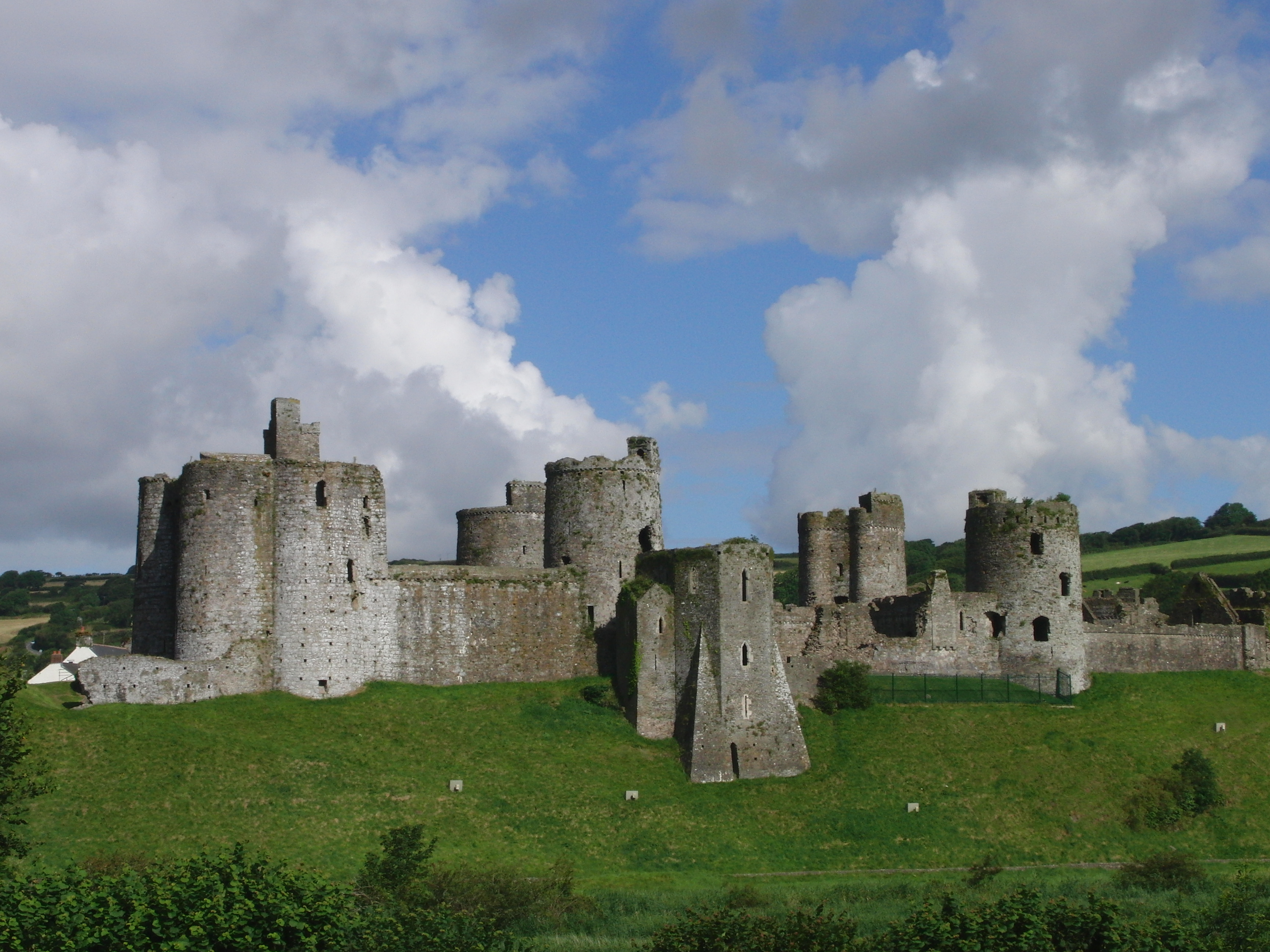
- Kidwelly Castle seen from the east

Site information
- Owner: Cadw
- Open to the public: Yes
- Condition: Ruined

Location
- Shown within Carmarthenshire
- Coordinates: 51°44′22″N 4°18′21″W

Site history
- Built: 1106
- Built by: Roger of Salisbury
- Battles/wars: Revolt of Owain Glyndŵr

Listed Building – Grade I

Kidwelly Castle (Welsh: Castell Cydweli) is a ruined castle overlooking the River Gwendraeth and the town of Kidwelly, Carmarthenshire, Wales.

== History ==
In 1106 Roger, bishop of Salisbury was made lord of the cantref of Kidwelly (Cydweli), following the Norman conquest of the area from the Welsh. The castle and adjoining walled town and priory were built soon after, supporting Norman rule in south Wales through military, economic and spiritual means. The original structure was an earth and timber ringwork, of which the semicircular outer ditch remains. This castle was just one of several built or rebuilt by Roger (including Old Sarum, Sherborne, Devizes and Malmesbury), reflecting his position as chancellor and justiciar of England, one of the most powerful men in the realm.

The castle fell to the Welsh several times in the twelfth century. In 1136, Welsh princess Gwenllian ferch Gruffudd was beheaded after being captured in a battle near the castle. At this time Maurice de Londres was lord of the castle. Rhys ap Gruffudd, prince of Deheubarth and son of Gwenllian (later known as the Lord Rhys) took Kidwelly Castle in 1159 and was recognised by King Henry II of England as the ruler of the region. With the fluctuations of Welsh and English power, he later lost the castle but retook it c.1190, and may have undertaken building work. Upon his death, it passed back to the Anglo-Normans. About this time, the outer ward appears to have been walled in stone, though little of this work now survives. The castle was captured and razed by Llywelyn the Great in 1215, and again in 1231. However, it was back in English hands by 1244.

The present stone castle is most likely to have been begun in the 1270s by Payn de Chaworth, Edward I's commander in south Wales. He built the square inner ward, which closely resembles that of Edward's castle at Flint, as well as the marcher stronghold of Goodrich, with large round corner towers. A royal loan of £360 in 1277 suggests that Edward I regarded the castle as an important part of his campaign against Llywelyn ap Gruffudd, the prince of Wales. After Payn died in 1279, the castle passed through an infant heiress and the marcher lord William de Valence to the Duchy of Lancaster. Construction of the outer ward occupied much of the 14th century (though it is also possible that it was largely built by Payn de Chaworth), and the gatehouse was still incomplete at the time of the Glyndŵr Rising. The castle was rapidly made defensible as the threat of rebellion increased, with a new ditch being dug, thorn hedges repaired and a timber tower constructed. The small garrison was unsuccessfully besieged by Welsh forces led by Henry Dwnn in August 1403 with assistance from soldiers from France and Brittany, who captured Kidwelly town and sacked it twice. The castle was again attacked in 1404. The gatehouse was finally completed in 1422.

After the accession of Henry VII in 1485, the castle was granted to Rhys ap Thomas, one of the new king's key allies at the Battle of Bosworth. He modernised the accommodation by building a new great hall. The castle reverted to the Crown in 1531, and gradually fell into ruin before being taken into state care in 1927. It is now managed by Cadw.

== Description ==
The plan of the castle consists of a square inner bailey defended by four round towers, which overlook a semi-circular outer curtain wall on the landward side, with a massive gatehouse at the southern angle, and a smaller one at the northern angle. The plan follows concentric principles, with the inner defences overlooking those of the outer ward, but the river prevents the outer ward fully encircling the inner one. The great gatehouse was begun in 1388-89 by John of Gaunt, duke of Lancaster. It consists of two parts, with a twin-towered outer section containing the defences fronting a rectangular residential block, following the model of the great north Welsh castles like Harlech, and particularly resembling the nearby royal gatehouse at Carmarthen. This probably served as the constable's accommodation.

The chapel tower, along with the hall range next to it, was probably an addition by William de Valence. The tower is polygonal, with pyramid spur bases, reflecting a south Welsh fashion also seen on the dam at Caerphilly Castle, and slightly later at Carew. The inner ward has no gatehouse, but four strong towers, one of which has a domed vault probably inspired by that of the great tower at Pembroke Castle. All the inner towers were raised in height in the 1390s, so that they could still overlook the outer ward.

== In folklore ==
The surrounding countryside is reputedly haunted by the headless ghost of Gwenllian ferch Gruffudd, wife of the Welsh prince Gruffydd ap Rhys, who was beheaded in 1136.

== In film ==
Kidwelly Castle was used as a location for the 1975 film Monty Python and the Holy Grail, appearing in the first scene after the titles. It has also appeared as Clun Castle in the 1986 Robin of Sherwood episode "Herne's Son".

== Gallery ==
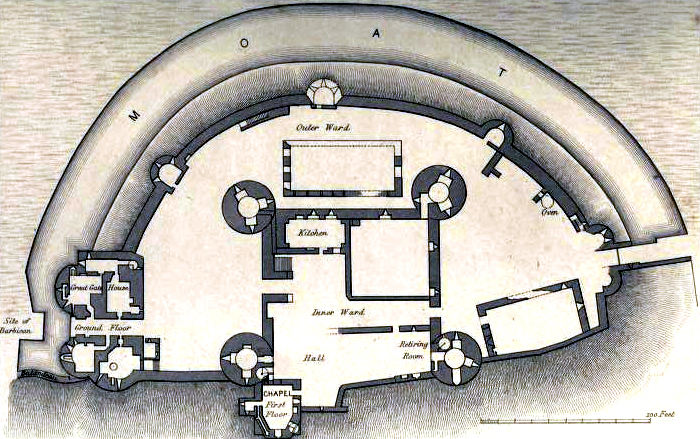
Plan of Kidwelly Castle

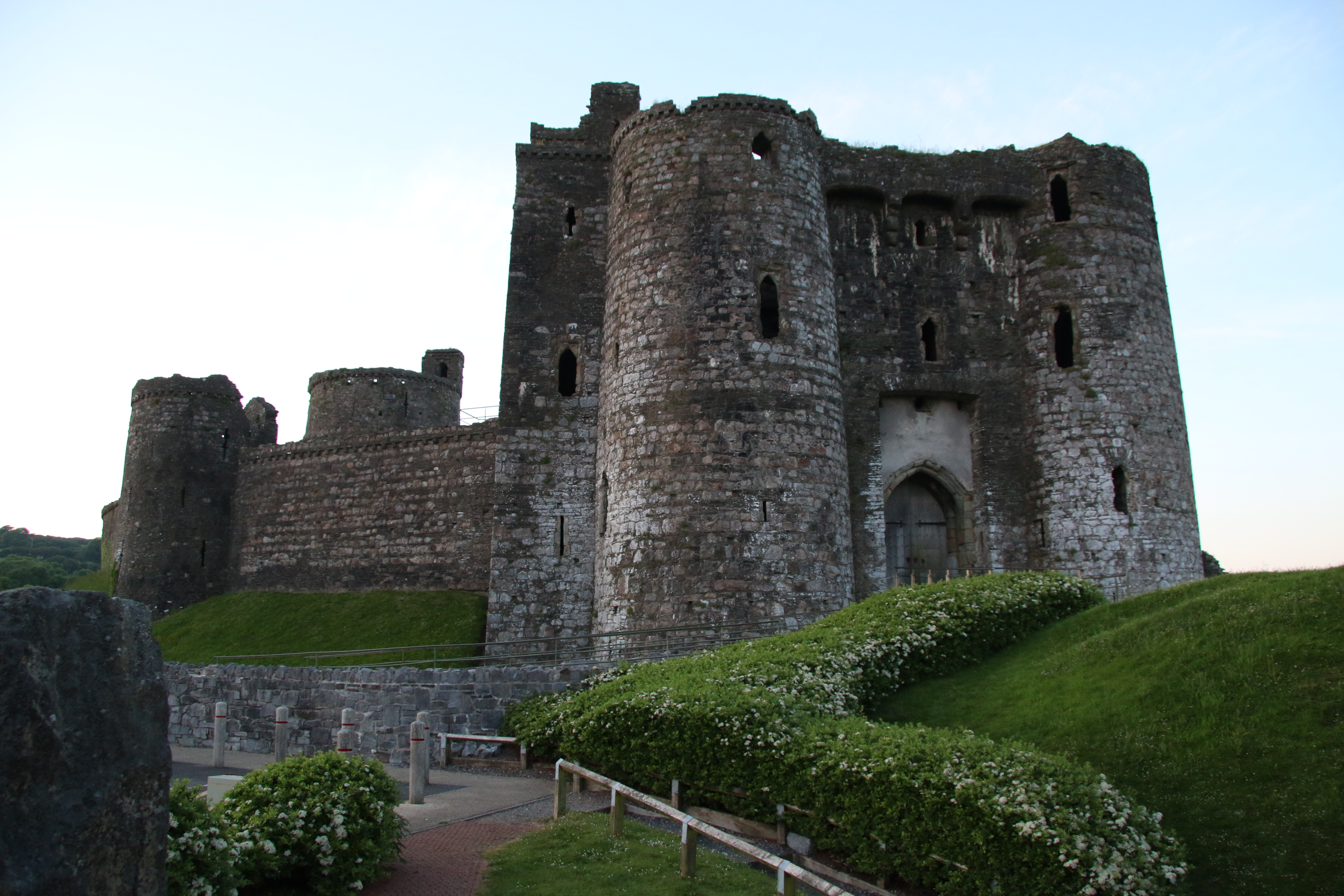
The south gatehouse

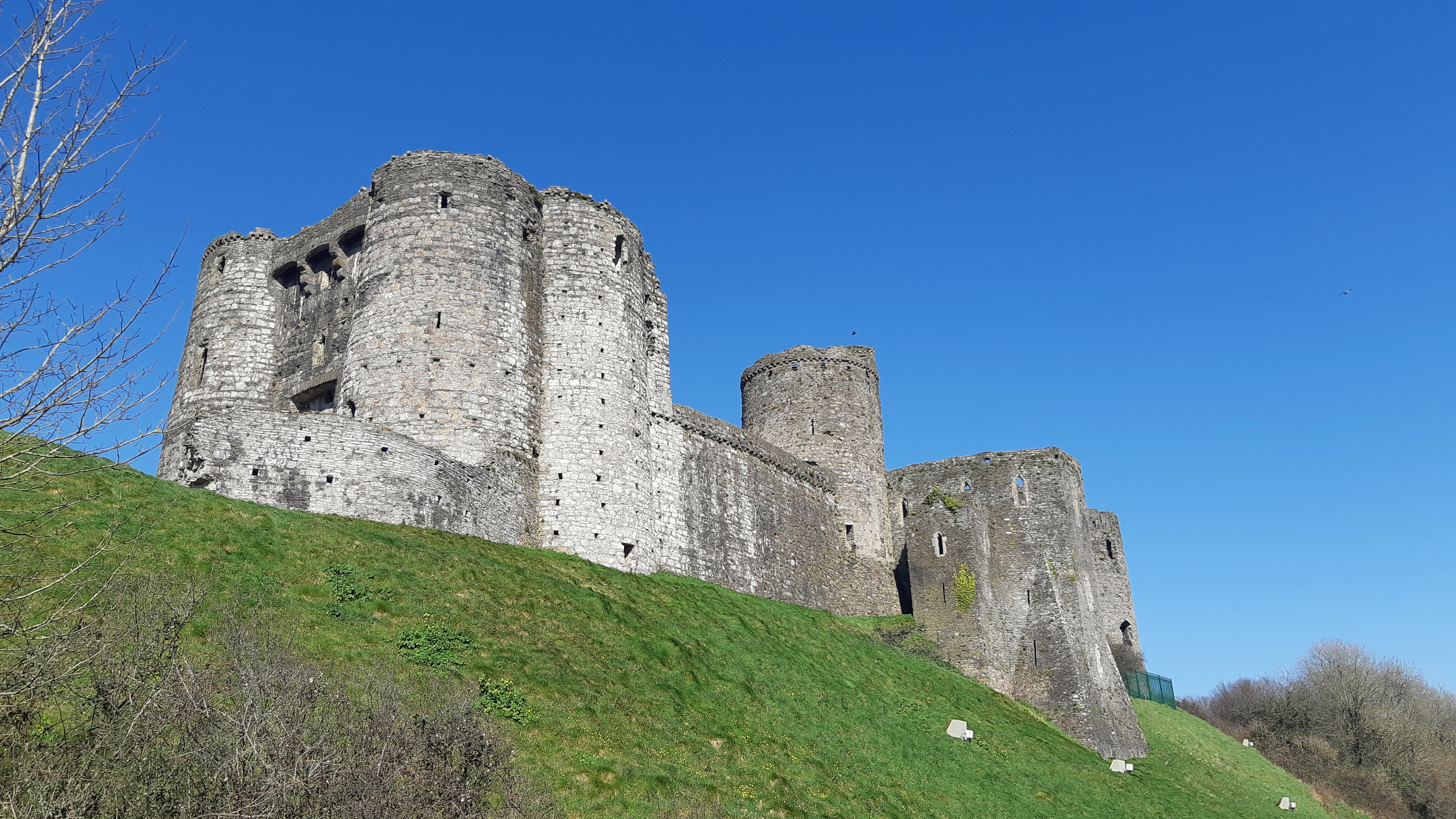
View from the SE, showing the gatehouse and chapel tower

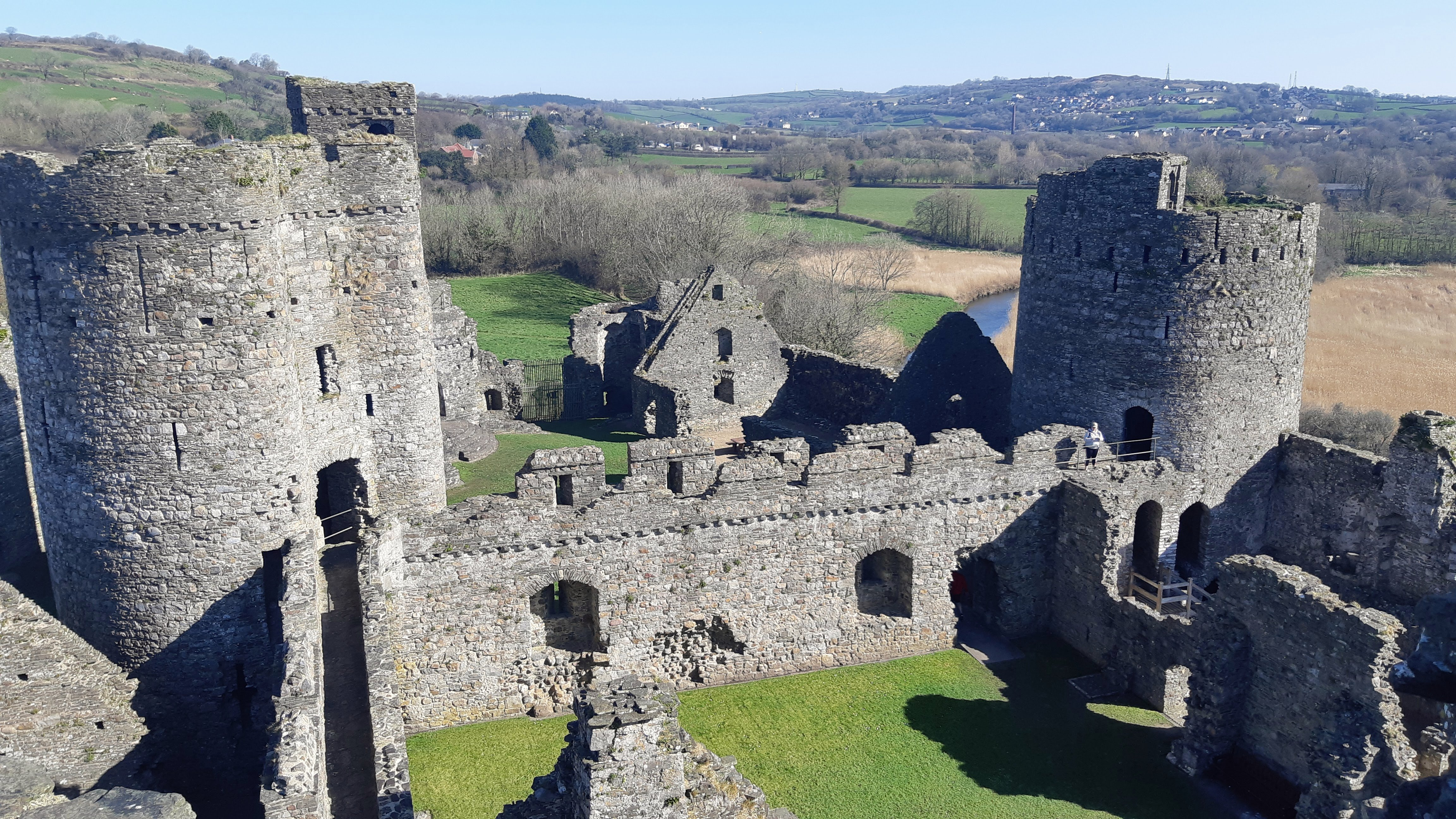
The inner courtyard, looking north

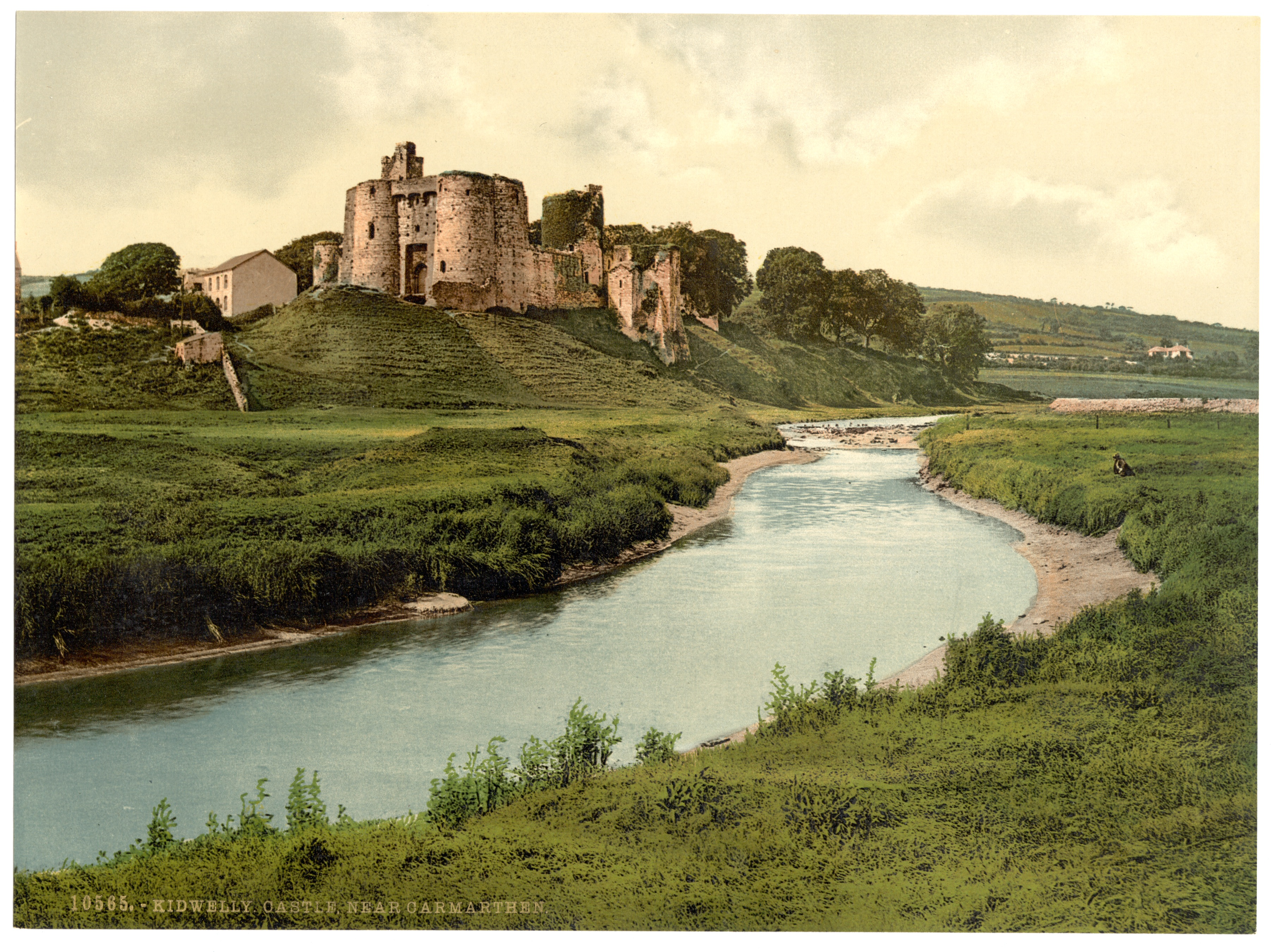
The castle in the 1890s, with the ruins partly overgrown

== See also ==
- List of Cadw properties
- List of castles in Wales
- Castles in Great Britain and Ireland

== Sources ==
- Goodall, John (2011). The English Castle. New Haven: Yale University Press.
- Kenyon, John R. (2007) [1986]. Kidwelly Castle (4th ed.). Cardiff: Cadw. ISBN 978-1-85760-256-2.
