= Grade II* listed buildings in Bridgend County Borough =

Bridgend County Borough shown within Wales

In the United Kingdom, the term listed building refers to a building or other structure officially designated as being of special architectural, historical, or cultural significance; Grade II* structures are those considered to be "particularly important buildings of more than special interest". Listing was begun by a provision in the Town and Country Planning Act 1947. Once listed, strict limitations are imposed on the modifications allowed to a building's structure or fittings. In Wales, the authority for listing under the Planning (Listed Buildings and Conservation Areas) Act 1990 rests with Cadw.

== Buildings ==
Name	Location Grid Ref. (Note: Sometimes known as OSGB36, the grid reference is based on the British national grid reference system used by the Ordnance Survey.) Geo-coordinates	Date Listed	Function	Notes	Reference Number	Image
Nottage Court	Nottage; SS8204078165; 51°29′24″N 3°42′02″W	5 January 1951	House	On the E edge of the hamlet of Nottage, on rising ground above the valley of Dewiscumbe, set in large walled grounds reached by a drive.	11213	Upload Photo
Tythegston Court	Tythegston; SS8568378932; 51°29′52″N 3°38′54″W	6 June 1953	House	On N side of A4106 opposite minor road into Tythegston village, and reached by short private road on NW side.	11216	Upload Photo
Glan Rhyd Railway Viaduct	Newcastle Higher; SS8989182786; 51°32′00″N 3°35′20″W	26 July 1963	Viaduct	Spanning River Ogmore on a minor road E of A4063 and almost directly beneath viaduct of M4.	11228	Glan Rhyd Railway Viaduct
Candleston Castle	Merthyr Mawr; SS8713677252; 51°28′59″N 3°37′36″W	26 July 1963	Castle	About 1.2km WSW of Merthyr Mawr church, on the E (inland) side of sand dunes at Merthyr Mawr Warren, and at the end of a minor road W of Merthyr Mawr village.	11230	See more images
New Inn Bridge	Merthyr Mawr; SS8910078391; 51°29′37″N 3°35′56″W	26 July 1963	Bridge	Road bridge over Ogmore river approximately 1.2km NE of Merthyr Mawr church.	11235	See more images
New Bridge, Merthyr Mawr	Merthyr Mawr; SS8915777965; 51°29′23″N 3°35′52″W	26 July 1963	Bridge	Crossing the Ogmore river approximately 1km NE of Merthyr Mawr church.	11236	New Bridge, Merthyr Mawr
St Teilo's Church	Merthyr Mawr; SS8828477520; 51°29′08″N 3°36′37″W	26 July 1963	Church	On NW side of settlement and N side of minor road between village and Merthyr Mawr Warren.	11242	See more images
St Cynwyd's Church	Llangynwyd Middle; SS8573288830; 51°35′12″N 3°39′03″W	26 July 1963	Church	The church lies at the centre of the village of Llangynwyd, surrounded by a D-shaped stone walled graveyard.	11243	See more images
Ty Mawr aka The Great House	Laleston; SS8747679783; 51°30′21″N 3°37′22″W	26 July 1963	House	On the main village thoroughfare a short distance SW of the Church of St David.	11244	Upload Photo
Church of St Mary Magdalen	Cynffig; SS8066281947; 51°31′26″N 3°43′18″W	26 July 1963	Church	The church stands in a raised curvilinear churchyard on a high prominence above the former site of Kenfig, by the junction of the side road into Maudlam village.	11248	See more images
Ty Mawr, Coity Higher	Coity Higher; SS9290481756; 51°31′28″N 3°32′42″W	26 July 1963	House	Approximately 0.5km NE of Coity church on E side of minor road from Coity to Cefn Hirgoed, and S side of junction with minor road to Pencoed.	11253	Ty Mawr, Coity Higher
Llwydarth farmhouse	Maesteg; SS8586590156; 51°35′55″N 3°38′57″W	27 October 1963	Farmhouse	The farmhouse is set on a steep hill, with access by farm track directly off the A4063 Maesteg to Bridgend Road.	11256	Upload Photo
Maesteg Sports Centre, The Cornstores	Maesteg; SS8485791515; 51°36′38″N 3°39′51″W	13 October 1966	Sports Centre	The Sports Centre is at the end of Albert Terrace, leading off Neath Road.	11257	Maesteg Sports Centre, The Cornstores
Old Bridge, Bridgend	Bridgend; SS9041679837; 51°30′25″N 3°34′49″W	29 September 1986	Bridge	Pedestrian bridge spanning the River Ogwr, a short way downstream from New Bridge.	11303	See more images
St John's Hospice	Bridgend; SS9029579915; 51°30′27″N 3°34′56″W	21 August 1952	Hospice	Set into slope, half way up the hill; small rubble walled gardens flanking entrance.	11311	St John's Hospice
St Illtyd's Church, Bridgend	Bridgend; SS9026280039; 51°30′31″N 3°34′58″W	29 September 1986	Church	To S of the castle, high above the town.	11312	See more images
Newcastle Castle, Bridgend	Bridgend; SS9022480078; 51°30′32″N 3°35′00″W	29 September 1986	Castle	On an elevated site to N of St Illtyd's Parish Church.	11313	See more images
Newcastle House, Bridgend	Bridgend; SS9011879987; 51°30′29″N 3°35′05″W	29 September 1986	House	Set back and above the road, to W of the castle and Parish church.	11318	Newcastle House, Bridgend
Merthyr Mawr House	Merthyr Mawr; SS8888577942; 51°29′22″N 3°36′07″W	5 April 1973	Country House	About 0.75km NE of parish church and reached by private drives on its W and NE sides.	11323	See more images
Maendy Farm, St Bride's Minor	St Bride's Minor; SS9084284153; 51°32′45″N 3°34′32″W	23 September 1974	Farmhouse	On sloping ground above Nant Bryncethin, W of Bryncethin village with dismantled railway close to rear.	11327	Maendy Farm, St Bride's Minor
Iron bridge over River Llynfi	Maesteg; SS8511791531; 51°36′39″N 3°39′38″W	8 September 1979	Bridge	Located at the bottom end of Treharne Row, off Castle Street, and below the rugby ground.	11331	Iron bridge over River Llynfi
The Hall Farm, Cynffig	Cynffig; SS8205681628; 51°31′16″N 3°42′05″W	22 June 1988	Farmhouse	The former farmhouse lies in the midst of suburban development at the end of a driveway opening between Nos 33 and 35 Hall Drive.	11349	The Hall Farm, Cynffig
Bethania Capel y Bedyddwyr Neillduol	Maesteg; SS8579690862; 51°36′18″N 3°39′02″W	14 July 1997	Chapel	Located prominently on an elevated site behind a railed forecourt, and facing down Ewenny Road.	18493	Upload Photo
Salem Welsh Baptist Chapel	Nantyffyllon, Maesteg; SS8505192746; 51°37′18″N 3°39′43″W	14 July 1997	Chapel	Located in a row of terraced housing, and set behind a narrow front railed area.	18495	Salem Welsh Baptist Chapel
Maesteg Council Offices, with flanking walls and piers	Maesteg; SS8522591309; 51°36′32″N 3°39′32″W	14 July 1997	Offices	Located behind the town hall on the S side of Talbot Street.	18499	Maesteg Council Offices, with flanking walls and piers
Church of St Tyfodwg, Llandyfodwg – Glynogwr	Ogmore Valley; SS9564087235; 51°34′28″N 3°30′26″W	28 July 1997	Church	The church stands in its churchyard the centre of the hamlet of Glynogwr, approximately halfway between Blackmill and Gilfach Goch.	18604	See more images
Church of St Cein	Garw Valley; SS9247887941; 51°34′48″N 3°33′11″W	10 August 1990	Church	Situated on the hilltop approx 2 km NE Llangeinor, reached from the road that links Garw and Ogmore Valleys, centre of a small rural settlement.	18635	See more images
Cefn Cribwr ironworks, the furnace and charging house	Cefn Cribwr; SS8510583447; 51°32′18″N 3°39′29″W	10 February 1997	Ironworks	The ironworks is located near the bottom of the Nant Iorwerth Coch, on the S side of the brook. The furnace stands at the hub of the group of buildings.	18955	Cefn Cribwr ironworks, the furnace and charging house
Cast house at Cefn Cribwr Ironworks	Cefn Cribwr; SS8510283467; 51°32′18″N 3°39′29″W	10 February 1997	Ironworks	The ironworks lies at the bottom of the Nant Iorwerth Coch. The casting house adjoins the furnace on the N side.	18957	Cast house at Cefn Cribwr Ironworks
Churchyard Cross in Coychurch Churchyard	Coychurch Lower; SS9395679677; 51°30′22″N 3°31′46″W	15 October 1997	Cross	Situated in Coychurch churchyard very close to the S door of the Church of St Crallo.	18965	Churchyard Cross in Coychurch Churchyard
Pyle Calvinistic Methodist Chapel, Capel y Pil, and schoolroom, with forecourt railings	Cynffig; SS8236681605; 51°31′16″N 3°41′49″W	1 February 1998	Chapel	Ffordd y Eglwys leads from Pyle to North Cornelly. The chapel is set gable end to the road W of the former railway line, with the schoolroom adjoining on the S.	19171	Pyle Calvinistic Methodist Chapel, Capel y Pil, and schoolroom, with forecourt railings
Glan Rhyd Railway Viaduct (partly in Newcastle Higher community)	St Bride's Minor; SS8989782793; 51°32′00″N 3°35′20″W	26 July 1963	Viaduct	Spanning River Ogmore on a minor road E of A4063 and almost directly beneath viaduct of M4.	20179	Glan Rhyd Railway Viaduct (partly in Newcastle Higher community)
Former Blast Engine Houses at Tondu Ironworks	Ynysawdre; SS8914584429; 51°32′52″N 3°36′00″W	11 September 1998	Engine House	At the foot of the hillside into which the Ironworks was built, West of Tondu station and Maesteg Road and at the edge of the now cleared former coal and rail works and yards.	20763	Former Blast Engine Houses at Tondu Ironworks
Calcining Kilns and attached abutment at Tondu Ironworks	Ynysawdre; SS8914484463; 51°32′53″N 3°36′01″W	11 September 1998	Kiln	Set in the hillside between the company housing of Derllwyn Road and Park Terrace above and the levelled area below where the Engine House stands, just above the old furnace bank and opposite the Lift Tower.	20816	Calcining Kilns and attached abutment at Tondu Ironworks
Lift Tower at Tondu Ironworks	Ynysawdre; SS8914784450; 51°32′53″N 3°36′00″W	11 September 1998	Ironworks	Set in the hillside between the company housing of Derllwyn Road and Park Terrace above and the levelled area below where the Engine House stands, against the old furnace bank and opposite the Calcining Kilns.	20817	Lift Tower at Tondu Ironworks
Coychurch Cemetery Chapel of Remembrance	Coychurch Lower; SS9315680215; 51°30′39″N 3°32′28″W	31 October 2001	Chapel	Within the cemetery grounds between the entrance and the main chapel complex and joined to the latter by a conifer lined walkway.	25840	Coychurch Cemetery Chapel of Remembrance
Coychurch Cemetery Capel Crallo and Capel Coity	Coychurch Lower; SS9323680206; 51°30′38″N 3°32′23″W	31 October 2001	Chapel	The main Capel Crallo fronts a lake with fountains and is joined to the smaller Capel Coity by a cloister walk and garden.	25841	Coychurch Cemetery Capel Crallo and Capel Coity

== See also ==
- List of Scheduled Monuments in Bridgend
- Grade I listed buildings in Bridgend County Borough
- Registered historic parks and gardens in Bridgend County Borough
