= Kenfig (disambiguation) =

Kenfig (Welsh: Cynffig) is a village and former borough in Bridgend, Wales.

Kenfig may also refer to:

- Cynffig/Kenfig SSSI, a Site of Special Scientific Interest which includes Kenfig Sands and its sand dunes near Kenfig
- Kenfig Castle, a ruined castle in Bridgend County Borough, Wales
- Kenfig Hill, a village in Bridgend County, South Wales
  - Kenfig Hill RFC, a rugby union club
- Kenfig Pool, a national nature reserve situated near Porthcawl, Bridgend
- River Kenfig, a river in Wales, straddling the county boroughs of Neath Port Talbot and Bridgend

== See also ==
- Cynfrig ap Madog (fl. 1283), constable of Castell-y-Bere in the kingdom of Gwynedd, Wales
