= Registered historic parks and gardens in Bridgend County Borough =

List of buildings in county borough of Wales

Bridgend County Borough shown within Wales

Bridgend County Borough is a county borough in south-east Wales. It covers an area of 251 km^{2} (97 sq mi). In 2021 the population was approximately 145,800.

The Cadw/ICOMOS Register of Parks and Gardens of Special Historic Interest in Wales was established in 2002 and given statutory status in 2022. It is administered by Cadw, the historic environment agency of the Welsh Government. Elisabeth Whittle described Cadw as having a "somewhat special and guiding role" in the preservation of historic parks and gardens, since they are "an integral part of Welsh archaeological and architectural heritage". The register includes just under 400 sites, ranging from gardens of private houses, to cemeteries and public parks. Parks and gardens are listed at one of three grades, matching the grading system used for listed buildings. Grade I is the highest grade, for sites of exceptional interest; Grade II*, the next highest, denotes parks and gardens of great quality; while Grade II denotes sites of special interest.

There are six registered parks and gardens in Bridgend County Borough. One is listed at Grade II*, and five at Grade II.

== Key ==
Grade	Criteria
I	Parks and gardens of exceptional interest
II*	Parks and gardens of great quality
II	Parks and gardens of special interest

== List of parks and gardens ==
List of parks and gardens
Name	Location Grid Ref. (Note: Sometimes known as OSGB36, the grid reference is based on the British national grid reference system used by the Ordnance Survey.) Geo-coordinates	Date Listed	Description / Notes	Grade	Reference Number	Image
Bryngarw	Ynysawdre; SS9039285553; 51°33′28″N 3°34′53″W	1 February 2022	Public park The grounds in their present form were created between 1910 and 1918 and feature extensive areas of informal woodland, including ponds, pools and water gardens. There is also a terraced lawn to the south of the house.	II	PGW(Gm)5(BRI)	a path leading to a wooden bridge over a pond
Court Colman	Pen-y-fai; SS8856381884; 51°31′28″N 3°36′23″W	1 February 2022	Park, country house garden and kitchen garden The grounds of the large nineteenth-century house include a walled garden, terraces, a sloping lawn bounded by a ha-ha, and an ornamental lake which lies to the south-west of the house. The informal woodland area includes an artificial waterfall and Italian marble ornaments.	II	PGW(Gm)7(BRI)	a large white house view across a lawn with trees
Coytrahen House	Ynysawdre; SS8943585172; 51°33′15″N 3°35′42″W	1 February 2022	Park, country house garden and kitchen garden The landscape park was developed in late eighteenth and mid-nineteenth century. There are traces of an earlier layout in the mostly twentieth century gardens which lie to the south of the house. The kitchen garden, consisting of five stone-walled compartments, three of which are terraced, is located to the north-west of the house.	II	PGW(Gm)65(BRI)	Coytrahen House
Glanrhyd Hospital	Pen-y-fai; SS9000081965; 51°31′31″N 3°35′09″W	1 February 2022	Country house garden The hospital (opened 1864) was built with grounds laid out in the manner of a contemporary country house. The design included an informal perimeter walk around the grounds and formal gardens which were subdivided into separate compartments, or 'airing courts'.	II	PGW(Gm)10(BRI)	Glanrhyd Hospital
Merthyr Mawr House	Merthyr Mawr; SS8871178021; 51°29′23″N 3°36′11″W	1 February 2022	Park, country house garden, kitchen garden and walled garden The eighteenth-century walled garden of the old Merthyr Mawr Hall is at the southern end of the site, the rest of estate was laid out in the early nineteenth century following the construction of a new house (1809). In the pleasure ground area to the north of the house are the remains of a medieval chapel and prehistoric hillfort (both are scheduled monuments).	II*	PGW(Gm)12(BRI)	a large house surrounded by trees
Tythegston Court	Tythegston; SS8555779228; 51°30′00″N 3°38′56″W	1 February 2022	Park, country house garden and kitchen garden The eighteenth-century park and gardens are contemporary with the remodelling of the house (1760s to early nineteenth century). The house is towards the southern corner of the triangular estate and has gardens to its east, south and west. The kitchen garden is to the north-west, and at a distance from the house.	II	PGW(Gm)15(BRI)	black metal gates between stone gate piers

== See also ==
- List of scheduled monuments in Bridgend
- Grade I listed buildings in Bridgend County Borough
- Grade II* listed buildings in Bridgend County Borough
