= List of dune systems of Wales =

This is a list of dune systems around the Welsh coast. Wales' dune systems are of interest to geomorphologists and ecologists as both landforms and ecosystems. Individual systems are referred to variously as warren, burrows or 'morfa' (Welsh plural: morfeydd) which signifies a 'sea-marsh' or 'salt-marsh', the two landforms typically existing alongside one another.

- Aberffraw Bay
- Barmouth
- Borth
- Castlemartin
- Crymlyn Burrows (SSSI)
- Cymyran Bay
- Dyffryn Ardudwy
- Harlech
- Kenfig (SSSI)
- Laugharne
- Llangenith
- Merthyr Mawr (SSSI)
- Mumbles
- Newborough Warren
- Oxwich (SSSI)
- Pembrey
- Penally
- Port Eynon
- Port Talbot
- Prestatyn
- Tremadog Bay
- Trewent
- Tywyn
- Whiteford Burrows
- Whitesands Bay
