= Grade I listed buildings in Bridgend County Borough =

Bridgend County Borough shown within Wales

In the United Kingdom, the term listed building refers to a building or other structure officially designated as being of special architectural, historical, or cultural significance; Grade I structures are those considered to be "buildings of exceptional interest". Listing was begun by a provision in the Town and Country Planning Act 1947. Once listed, strict limitations are imposed on the modifications allowed to a building's structure or fittings. In Wales, the authority for listing under the Planning (Listed Buildings and Conservation Areas) Act 1990 rests with Cadw.

== Buildings ==
Name	Location Grid Ref. (Note: Sometimes known as OSGB36, the grid reference is based on the British national grid reference system used by the Ordnance Survey.) Geo-coordinates	Date Listed	Function	Notes	Reference Number	Image
St John the Baptist Church	Porthcawl; SS8365977477; 51°29′03″N 3°40′37″W	1 May 1951	Church	In the centre of the old village of Newton with two sides of the rectangular churchyard fronting the village green; main access at WSW.	11214	See more images
Sker Farmhouse	Cynffig; SS7952979838; 51°30′17″N 3°44′14″W	6 June 1952	Gentry house	Located on a limestone promontory jutting west into Swansea Bay, approximately 4.2 kilometres N of Porthcawl, and reached by a long farm road leading W from the minor road from Porthcawl to Kenfig.	11217	See more images
St James's Church	Pyle; SS8255882645; 51°31′50″N 3°41′40″W	26 July 1963	Church	The parish church of St James, Pyle, stands in its own churchyard N of the village centre, on the road to Margam.	11227	See more images
St David's Church	Laleston; SS8753979854; 51°30′23″N 3°37′18″W	26 July 1963	Church	In the centre of the village, on a slight rise above the High Street. Church stands in a roughly circular churchyard surrounded by rubble wall with wrought iron gates S and E.	11246	See more images
St Crallo's Church	Coychurch Lower; SS9396279693; 51°30′22″N 3°31′45″W	26 July 1963	Church	Situated in the heart of Coychurch village.	11252	See more images
Coity Castle	Coity Higher; SS9231081503; 51°31′20″N 3°33′13″W	26 July 1963	Castle	Located immediately SW of Coity Church and prominently sited above Heol West Plas.	11254	See more images
St Mary's Church	Coity Higher; SS9239181548; 51°31′21″N 3°33′09″W	26 July 1963	Church	Located on NE side of Coity village in a large churchyard with open fields to N and Coity Castle to SW.	11255	See more images
St David's Church	Bettws; SS8990386765; 51°34′08″N 3°35′24″W	30 July 1997	Church	Situated on the hilltop at the centre of the village which became the core of a post-war estate development.	18626	See more images

== See also ==
- List of Scheduled Monuments in Bridgend
- Grade II* listed buildings in Bridgend County Borough
- Registered historic parks and gardens in Bridgend County Borough
