= Prince of Wales Inn =

Public house in Kenfig, Wales

The Prince of Wales Inn
- Tafarn y Tywysog Cymru (Welsh)
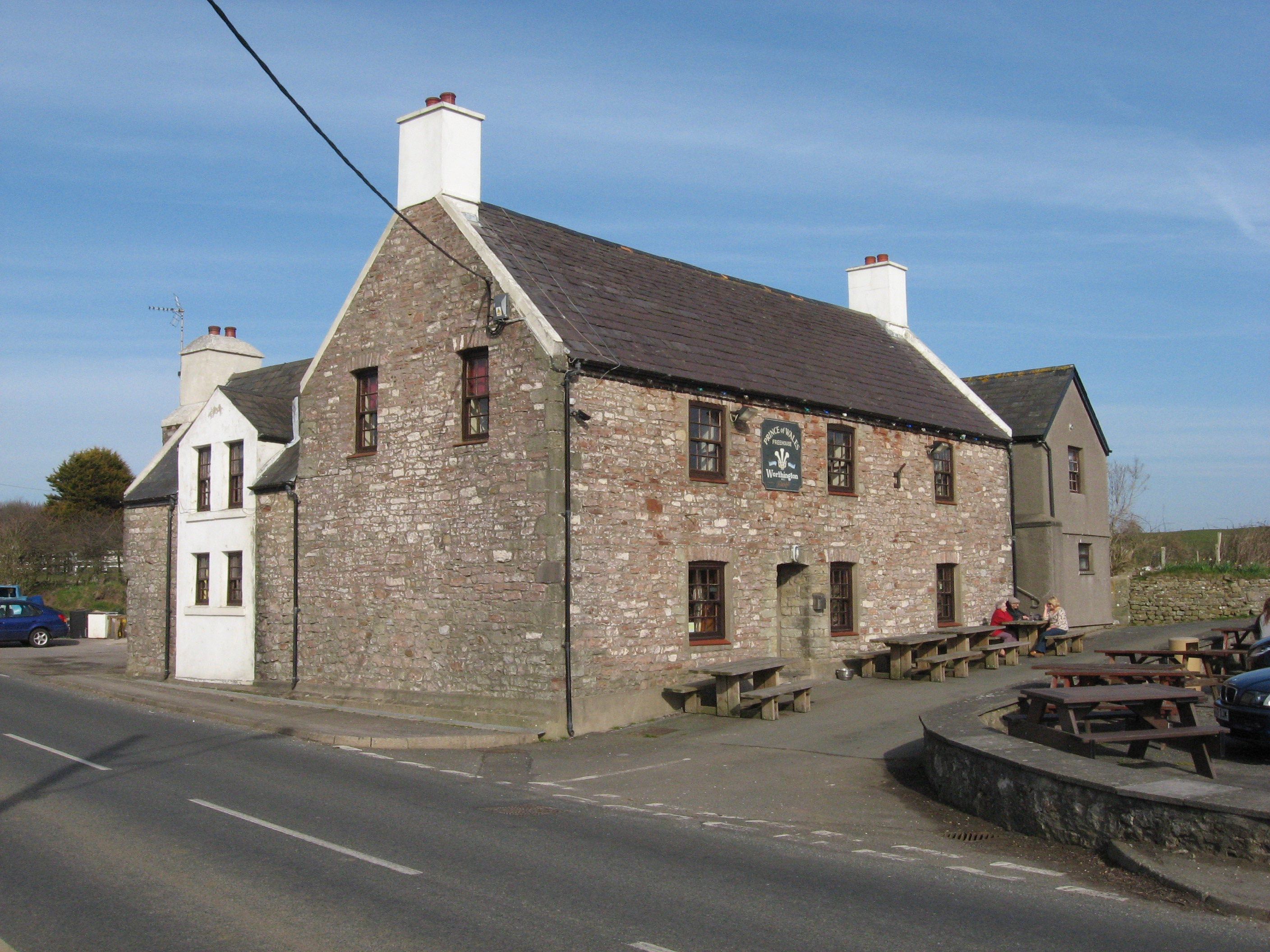
- The Prince of Wales Inn

- Shown in Bridgend
- 51.5224°N 3.7258°W
- Location: West Road, Kenfig

History
- Built: 1808

Site notes
- Architectural style: Medieval style

Listed Building – Grade II
- Official name: Prince of Wales Inn, also known as Ty Newydd
- Designated: 6 June 1952
- Reference no.: 11219

The Prince of Wales Inn (Welsh: Tafarn y Tywysog Cymru), formerly Kenfig Town Hall (Welsh: Neuadd y Dref Cynffig), is a public house in Heol Gorllewin, Kenfig, Bridgend County Borough, Wales. The structure, which used to be a municipal building, is a Grade II listed building.

== History ==
The first municipal building was in the old town, which was itself centred round Kenfig Castle. Following coastal erosion, civic leaders decided to relocate the town further inland. The new building was commissioned with the benefit of monies left by a former portreeve of the borough, Evan Griffith, in the early 17th century. The site they selected was on the east side of the West Road (Welsh: Heol Gorllewin).

The building was designed in the medieval style, built in rubble masonry and was completed in around 1605. The building originally faced east. Internally, the principal room was the courtroom, where the portreeve and 12 aldermen of the borough met, on the first floor. The room also served as the venue for the bi-annual meetings of the court leet, and, on occasion, was used as a mortuary for sailors whose bodies had washed ashore on nearby beaches following shipwrecks.

The building also incorporated the local public house, which was known as the New House Tavern (Welsh: Ty Newydd) until the late 18th century, when it was renamed The Prince of Wales Inn (Welsh: Tafarn y Tywysog Cymru), in honour of the then Prince of Wales. The building was remodelled at a cost of £400, so that it faced south, in 1808.

The new design involved an asymmetrical main frontage of three bays. There was a doorway to the left of the central bay. The building was fenestrated by paned casement windows with voussoirs on both floors. The new courtroom was accessed using an external staircase at the east end of the building. Sunday School classes were held in the courtroom from 1864. The borough council, which had met in the courtroom, was abolished under the Municipal Corporations Act 1883. Its assets, including the building, were transferred to a specially-formed entity, the Kenfig Corporation Trust, in 1886. By the late 19th century, the building was in a dilapidated state, but it has since been restored and the whole building now operates as a public house.

Objects of interest in the building include a pewter copy of the municipal ceremonial mace, the original of which was acquired in 1714 and is now kept in the Amgueddfa Cymru – Museum Wales.
