= Merthyr Mawr Sand Dunes =

Protected area in Glamorgan, Wales

Coordinates: 51°28′48″N 03°38′33″W

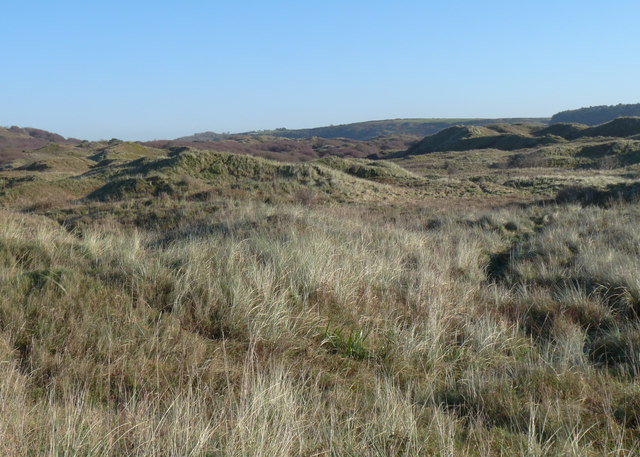
Grassy duneland, Merthyr Mawr

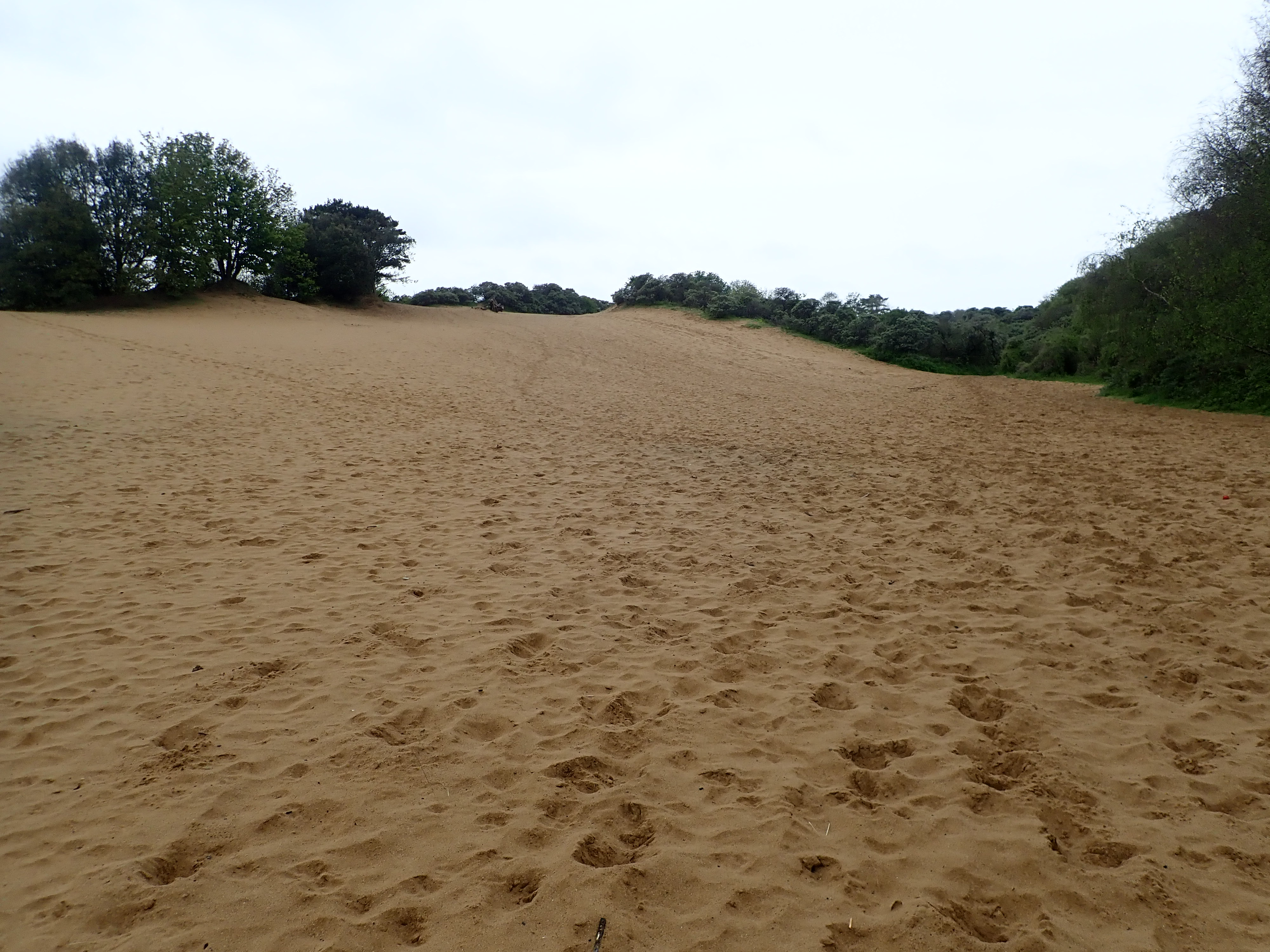
View from the bottom of The Big Dipper

Merthyr Mawr Sand Dunes are sand dunes and a Site of Special Scientific Interest in Bridgend, south Wales. The village of Merthyr Mawr is nearby.

The largest dune at the site is known as The Big Dipper and is the second-largest of its kind in Europe, measuring around 200 feet (61 m).

== Geography ==
The site of the dunes is a large interdunal wetland that covers an area of 840 acres (340 ha) in the County of Bridgend, around five kilometres (3.1 mi) southwest of Bridgend town. The site was originally connected to the dunes at Kenfig Burrows but a limestone path farmland and two golf courses have been constructed that now separate the two dune areas. Both sites have been designated as national nature reserves and Special Areas of Conservation under the Habitats Directive by the European Union. The dunes derive their name from the nearby village of Merthyr Mawr.

In its early history, the dunes were part of a continuous stretch of dunes, reaching from the estuary of the River Ogmore to the Gower Peninsula. In 2018, Bridgend Council launched a two-year conservation plan for the dunes, stating that sand dunes were "one of the habitats most at risk in Europe". The project was expected to cost more than £300,000.

The largest dune at the site is known as The Big Dipper, which is the biggest of its kind in Wales. The dune is the second-largest in Europe, measuring around 200 feet (61 m), smaller only than the Dune of Pilat in Western France. The ruins of Candleston Castle are located on the edge of the dunes.

== In popular culture ==
The dunes at Merthyr Mawr were used during the filming of Lawrence of Arabia, a film based on the life of T. E. Lawrence. The site doubled for the deserts on the Arabian Peninsula.

== See also ==
- List of Sites of Special Scientific Interest in Mid & South Glamorgan
