= River Kenfig =

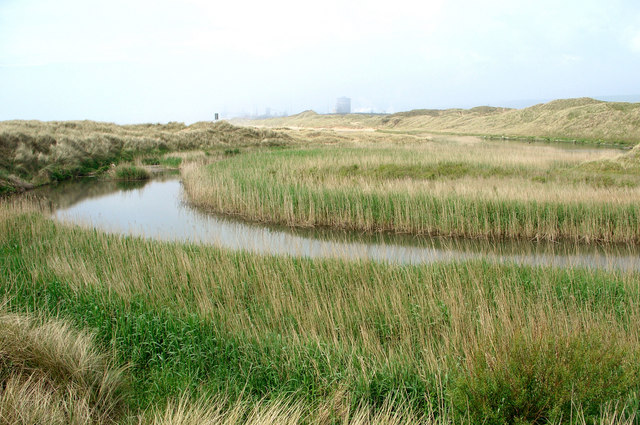
- These extensive reed beds lie close to the mouth of the river
- Native name: Afon Cynffig (Welsh)

Location
- Country: United Kingdom, Wales
- Region: South Wales
- County: Neath Port Talbot, Bridgend
- Cities: Pyle, Marlas, North Cornelly

Physical characteristics
- Source
  - location: Mynydd Margam, Neath Port Talbot, Wales
- Mouth: Swansea Bay
  - coordinates: 51°32′15″N 3°45′41″W
- Length: 18.0 km (11.2 mi)
- Discharge
  - location: Kenfig Sands, Bridgend

The River Kenfig (Welsh: Afon Cynffig) is a river in Wales, straddling the county boroughs of Neath Port Talbot and Bridgend. It is approximately 18 kilometres long.

== Course ==
The river rises in the forest of Mynydd Margam, southwest of Maesteg. From here it flows south, and turns west near the town of Pyle, through the area known as the M4 Corridor. The river is at the northern edge of the Kenfig National Nature Reserve, a designated Site of Special Scientific Interest. It also forms the boundary of the Neath Port Talbot and Bridgend districts for much of its course, before running into the sea at Margam Sands, close to Margam Moors. It flows through an area steeped in folklore and local legend, much of it tied in with the lost towns beneath the shifting sands of Kenfig Burrows.

Although the river has few significant tributaries, it picks up a few small streams on its course. Major tributaries include the Nant Iorwaeth-goch, which joins the river as it turns westward north of Kenfig Hill, the Afon Fach, a stream which flows through North Cornelly and Pyle, and the Coal Brook, which rises in Margam Park.

== Kenfig National Nature Reserve ==
The final stretch of the River Kenfig at Kenfig Sands is at the northern boundary of the Kenfig National Nature Reserve. This reserve contains Kenfig Pool and Kenfig Burrows, its largest sand dune system. The river does not actually flow through the village of Kenfig. It runs about a mile to the north; however, it flows past the remains of Kenfig Castle, which is at the original site of the village. This site was abandoned in the 13th century when the sand dunes, shifted by wild storms, began to bury parts of the village. Only the tower of Kenfig Castle is now visible.

== Industry ==
The river is south of the vast industrial complex of Port Talbot and Margam, which includes the Port Talbot Steelworks. In 1968 BorgWarner opened a plant for the manufacture of automatic transmissions on the Kenfig Industrial Estate alongside the lower reaches of the river. In January 1976 the plant celebrated the completion of its two millionth gearbox, which was 'presented' to A B Volvo. At that time a press release stated that Borg-Warner's UK plants at Letchworth and at Kenfig were producing transmissions for use in more than fifty different car models, and that more than half the gearboxes produced were exported outside the UK. In 2001, the factory faced the threat of closure but was saved by a new contract from Korean car company Kia. In December 2008, Borg-Warner announced that the plant would finally close by mid 2010 with the loss of all 110 jobs at the site; a statement from the company blamed the economic downturn for the decision.
