= Candleston Castle =

14th-century house in Bridgend, Wales

- Merthyr Mawr, Wales
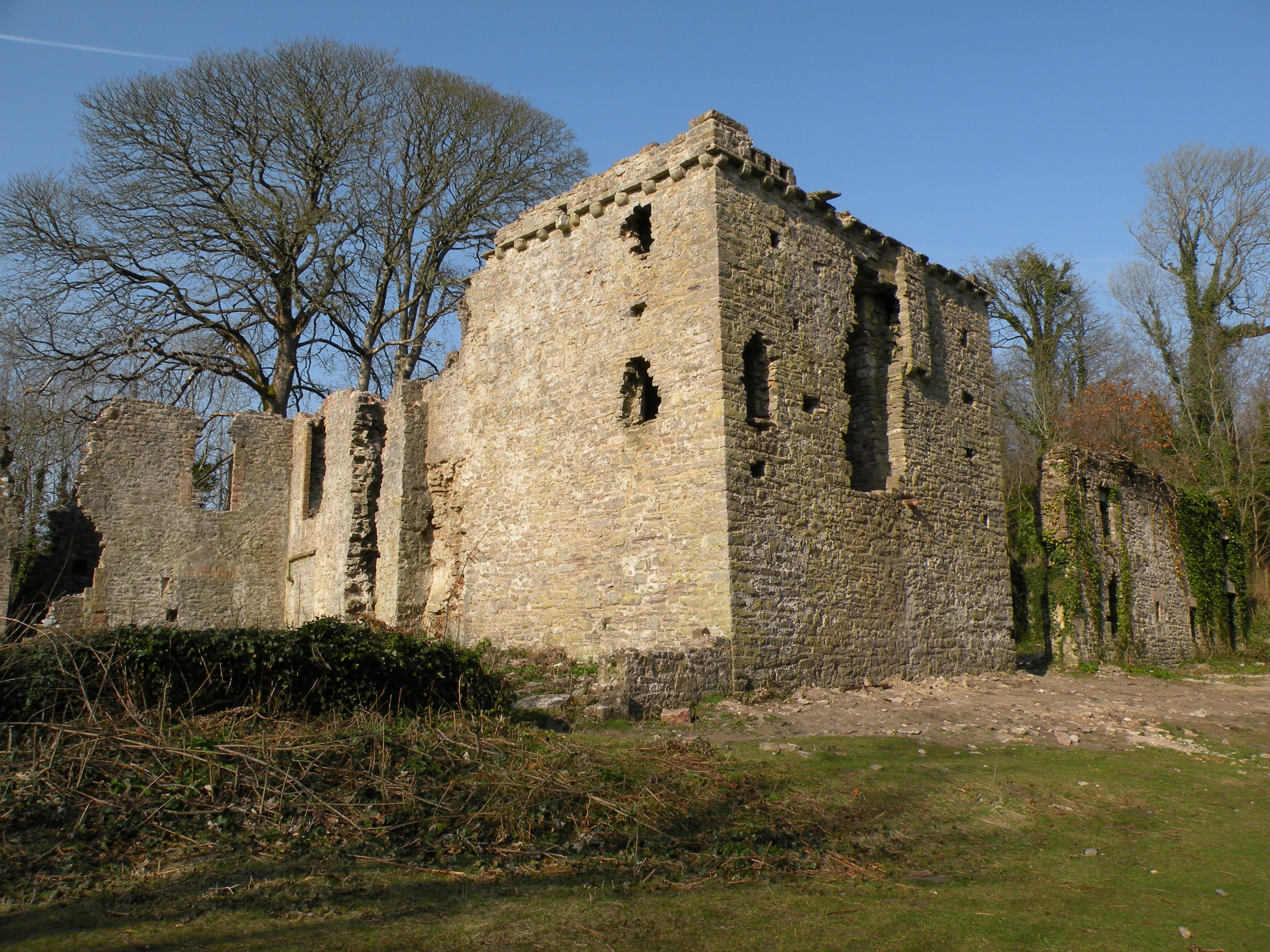
- Candleston Castle, view from south of the 14th-century tower, to rear. Left the hall and domestic range, from the middle of which projects to left the 17th-century west wing. To right of the tower is the stable block, c. 1800.

Location
- Shown within Wales
- Coordinates: 51.4825°N 3.6273°W
- Grid reference: grid reference SS871772

Site history
- Materials: Stone

Candleston Castle (historically sometimes Candlestone Castle) is a 14th-century fortified manor house, in ruins since the 19th century. It is 0.75 miles (1.2 km) southwest of Merthyr Mawr, Glamorgan, Wales, now Bridgend County Borough and just 0.75 miles (1.2 km) northwest of Ogmore Castle, separated by the River Ogmore. Candleston's original long and narrow rectangular structure lay across the western end of a low narrow promontory, suggesting a defensive position. The castle is believed to be named after the Norman family of Cantilupe, thought to be its first feudal tenants.

== Geography ==
The ruins of Candleston, which had been part of a medieval settlement, stand on the Merthyr Mawr Sand Dunes, on the edge of the Merthyr Mawr Warren. They are east of Porthcawl off of Swansea Bay.

== History ==
=== 12th – 14th centuries ===
In the 12th century, Candleston manor passed to the St Quintin lords of Talyfan and Llanbleddian; The Cantilupe family are considered Candleston's first tenants. Although there are no records to show that the de Cantilupes were at the site in the 12th century, it is believed that the name Candleston is derived from their name, variously spelled Cantulupo, Cantilupo, Cantelo. In 1596 it was called Cantelowstowne and in 1635 Cantloston. It was Tregantlow in Welsh, Tref or Tre meaning town.

Candleston Castle, a fortified manor, was built in the 14th century. An enclosure, in the shape of a D, surrounded the structure. The late-medieval manor may have been constructed on the site of a previous building, based upon the presence of remnants of an earlier wall. The castle may have been built by Robert de Canteilupe III, who owned one ploughland at Candleston in 1320 according to the Despenser Survey of Glamorgan of that year. (Note: An alternative builder of the castle may have been Nicholas de Cantilupe, who was a sub-baliff in 1366 for the county of Glamorgan and who "appears to" have died without having fathered children.) Robert III, who is not recorded after 1320, may have been succeeded by John de Cantilupe, who may have been the Abbot of Margam in 1315. (Note: The source states that it is "uncertain whether he can be identified with the John de Cantilupe who was Abbot of Margam in 1325.") Robert de Cantilupe III's daughter Joan, heiress of Candleston, married Sir William Horton of Tregwynt, Pembrokeshire.

Sands from the dunes shifted starting in the late 14th century and encroached on nearby Kenfig Castle, resulting in its evacuation. The Royal Commission on Ancient and Historical Monuments in Wales reported that Candleston's "elevated position was just sufficient to save it from the encroaching sand dunes on the northern fringe of the Merthyr Mawr Warren, which entirely surrounded the promontory and formed a relatively stable margin close to the southern wall of the castle." (Note: Since then it is likely the dunes experienced "a complex history of sand blowing, stabilization and re-mobilization.")

=== 15th – 19th centuries ===
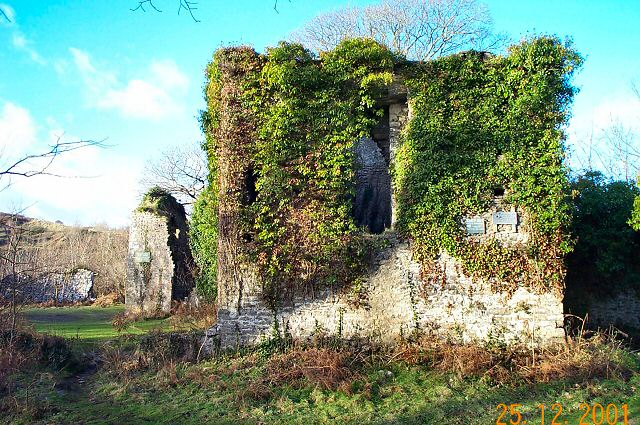
The ruins

Candleston passed through Joan Cantilupe Horton and Sir William Horton's son Jenkin, who may not have resided at Candleston, to Jenkin's daughter Jennet or Janet. The manor then went to the Cradocks when Janet married Richard Cradock about 1468. Nicholas Horton briefly resided at Candleston and paid a small quit rent in 1411 for what is believed to be Candleston to the lord of Merthyr Mawr.

Joan Robert, reported to be the daughter of Margaret Cantilupe, married John Eyre. In 1412 and 1429, Eyre is recorded as Candleston's landholder. Janet Horton and Richard Cradock received Candleston, possibly because the Eyres did not have children or due to the nature of their tenure.

Janet and Richard Cradock's son, Sir Mathew Cradock (about 1468–1531) inherited the property. During his career, he was steward of Gower, Chancellor of Glamorgan and constable for life of the Kenfig and Caerphilly castles. In the late 15th century the manor was refurbished and modified; It is believed that Mathew Cradock was responsible for the construction. His only child, Margaret, was heiress of the manor. Sir Richard Herbert married Margaret. He was from Ewyas, Hereford. In around 1500 alternations were made to the Hall range. It had a four-centred, local green sandstone ogee arch, pointed and chamfered arch tower, parapet corbelling of the roofs, and an "impressive perpendicular chimneypiece".

George Herbert of Swansea inherited Candleston from Margaret and Sir Richard Herbert. Mathew Herbert, George's son then held Candleston. Brothers, grandsons of Sir George Herbert, had the manor next. First, Sir William Herbert had the manor in 1598, then Sir John Herbert inherited the manor after his brother's death in 1609. Sir John died in 1617 and Mary, his daughter and heiress, married Sir William Doddington.

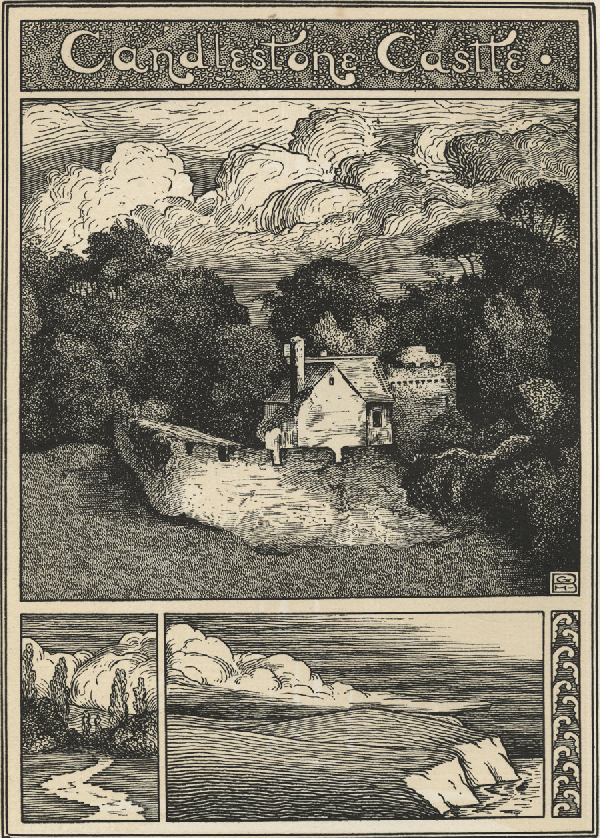
Candlestone Castle, a lithograph from Penholm (1901), a book of drawings by G. Howell-Baker

Robert Greville, 4th Baron Brooke of Warwick married Doddington's granddaughter. His brother inherited the property upon his death in 1676. Francis Greville, great-grandson of the brother, was Earl of Warwick and 8th Baron Brook. The manor was held by the Grevilles, who visited only occasionally, made only minor modifications, and sold it to the Franklen family in the 18th century. Between 1806 and 1808, Sir John Nicholl resided at the manor while his manor was built. Candleston Castle was sold by Richard Franklen to Nicholl in 1830, when it was said to have included a drawing room, dining room, breakfast rooms, four bedrooms and a coach house. It was evacuated in the 19th century, after having operated as a farm house.

In the early 19th century modifications included construction of a stable, the castle was crenellated for ornamental purposes and a defensive tower was built. The stepped base of a Calvary cross, of unreported date, with the fallen cross itself lying alongside, was found near the windmill uncovered by sand in 1823.

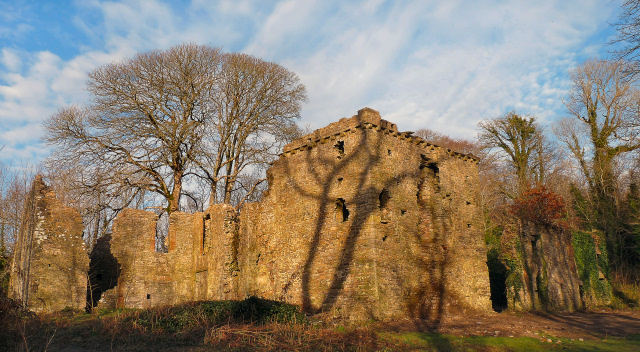
Candleston Castle

=== 20th – 21st centuries ===
In the 21st century, the castle is an "ivy covered ruin". Wildfowl, butterflies, moths, autumn gentian, violets and orchids are seen in the area. The area around the castle is woodland and farm land. The nearby Merthyr Mawr dunes are among northwestern Europe's "highest and most voluminous" sand dunes, and it is the "second highest mobile sand dune system in Europe." The dunes west of Candleston Castle are more than 80 metres (260 ft) above sea level and are now fairly stabilised.

== See also ==
- Castles in Great Britain and Ireland
- List of castles in Wales
- List of Scheduled Monuments in Bridgend
