= Cynffig =

Cynffig was a community in the west of Bridgend County Borough, bordering Neath Port Talbot, Wales. The community included the villages of North Cornelly, South Cornelly, Kenfig and Pyle.

Following The Bridgend (Cynffig, Cornelly and Pyle Communities) (Electoral Changes) Order 2002 the community was divided to create new Pyle and Cornelly communities, each with a new community council of nine members. The new council members were elected at the May 2004 elections.

At the local level Cynffig was governed by Cynffig Community Council. In 2010 legal proceedings were finally dropped against Margaret Jones, who had been the council clerk from 1982 to 2002. There had been a dispute about the size of her retirement gratuity.
