= North Cornelly =

Village in Bridgend, Wales

North Cornelly is a moderately sized village in Bridgend County Borough, Wales. It is four miles from the seaside resort of Porthcawl and six miles from the town of Bridgend. The Kenfig nature reserve is less than a mile away.

The village has numerous facilities and notable features. There is a Post Office, an Asian take-away, a chip shop, several pubs, a pharmacy, a doctor's surgery, a community centre with playpark, a local mechanic, and several newsagents.

== Geography and transport ==
North Cornelly is situated in close proximity to many towns and villages. The nearest villages are South Cornelly and Pyle. Pyle is known for its train station. The town of Porthcawl is situated several miles south and is easily accessible. The towns of Port Talbot and Bridgend are also highly accessible either with or without the use of the M4 Motorway. Bridgend can be reached using the A48 Dual Carriageway.

The M4 runs along the South of the village, East to West. The Broadlands housing estate is located next to the motorway and contains some of the more expensive houses in the village. Opposite the front of this estate are the remnants of 'The Cornelly Arms' and a pub called 'The New House.' There is also a betting shop beside the latter. The west and northwest of the village mainly consist of early 20th century housing. Many of these houses are council owned. The community centre and playpark are also located in this part of the village. This part of the village also leads to Kenfig Dunes through the small sub-village of Mawdlam. The north and east of the village mainly comprises council estates.

Historically, Transport has been of a good standard in the village. However, in the time since nationwide bus service cuts, the frequency of buses has decreased. There are irregular buses to Porthcawl and Bridgend (63) and to Port Talbot (224). It is also possible to get to Cardiff via the 63 to Porthcawl and then the X2 to Cardiff. There is a small train station in Pyle and larger ones in the nearby towns of Bridgend and Port Talbot. The nearest airport is Cardiff International Airport.

== Education and schools ==
There are three schools in the area. The first is Cornelly Primary School which is the largest school in terms of physical size and the number of students. It has students from all parts of North (and South) Cornelly. Afon-Y-Felin is much smaller than Cornelly Primary School and mainly has students from the Marlas estate and the neighbouring village, Pyle.

Ysgol Yr Ferch O'r Sger is a Welsh-speaking school with a large number of pupils from further afield (due to Welsh-speaking schools being reasonably uncommon in the area). The students in this school are usually streamed to the Welsh comprehensive, Llanharri Comprehensive School. The pupils from the other two schools usually attend Porthcawl Comprehensive School or Cynffig Comprehensive School.

== Sports ==
Cornelly United FC has its grounds at Meadow Street in North Connelly.
