= St John's House, Bridgend =

Historic house in Bridgend, Wales

Coordinates: 51°30′27″N 3°34′56″W

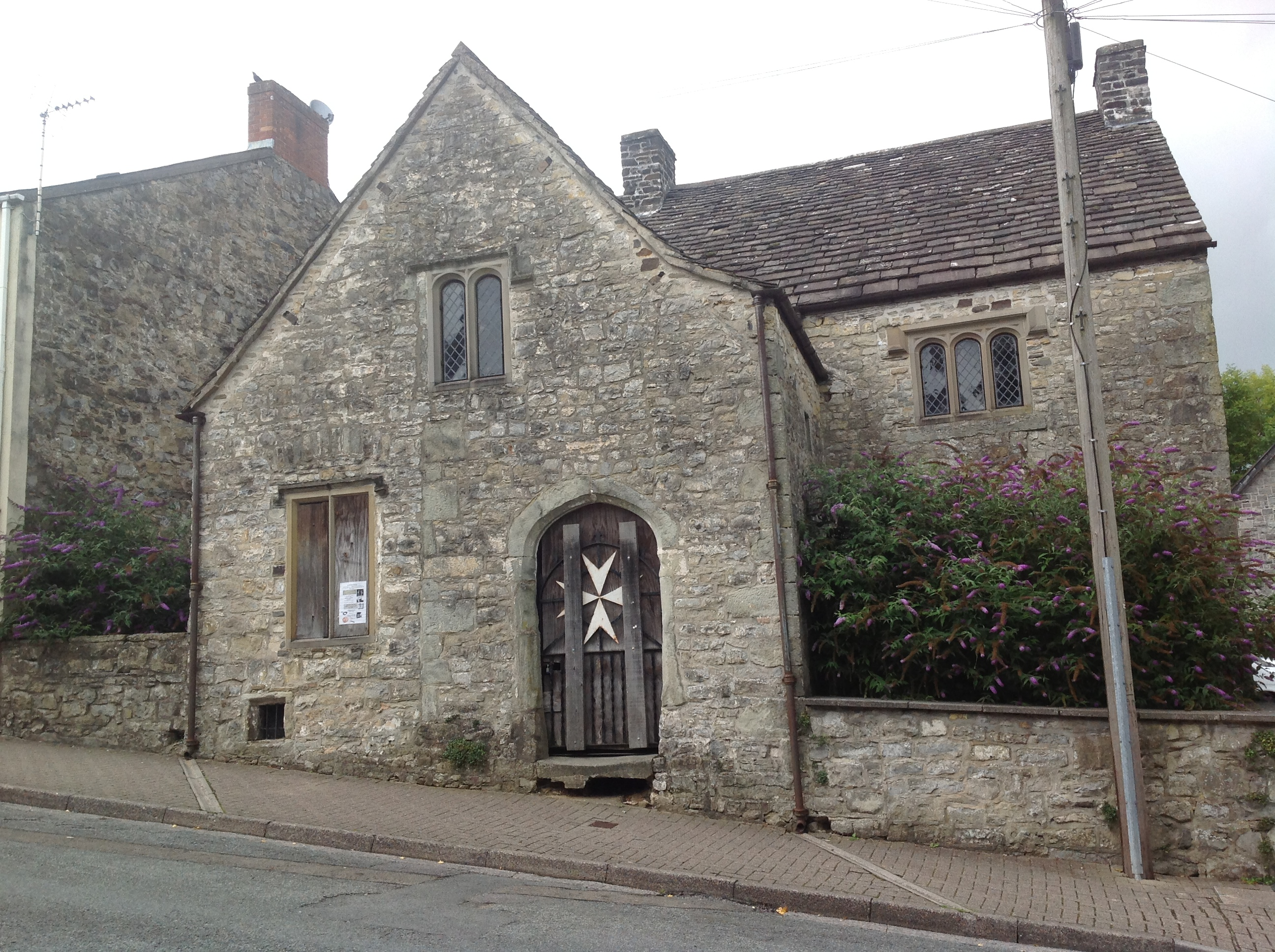
St John's House

St John's House (also known as St John's Hospice) is a Grade II* listed building in the South Wales town of Bridgend, the oldest habitable building in the town. The full history of the building is unclear due to gaps in documentation.

== Construction ==
The building is primarily made of grey-green local Quarella stone.

Dendrochronology indicates that the house may have been built c. 1511, during Bridgend's "Tudor market era", though it is possible that the original house was built earlier, and then the wood beams analysed were added during a renovation.

Other pieces of evidence suggest that the building is medieval in origin, such as the "hearth-passage plan in which the principal doorway opens into a cross-passage behind the hall fireplace, between the hall and outer room", and artifacts including a bell that "matches both the rare design and material of early medieval bells that were used during religious practices", though "another expert identified the bell as an industrial era cow bell".

There were various changes made to the building after its initial construction, such as adding a Georgian kitchen and demolishing a Georgian shop porch.

== Ownership ==
In the late 1700s, the building was owned by tanner Walter Coffin (father of coalowner and MP Walter Coffin).

The house has been occupied by many residents over the centuries, notably the Order of St John of Jerusalem, who purchased it in 1920. An earlier connection with the Order of St John is suggested by the a medieval carved stone tablet which was originally on an outside wall, and it may have been used as a hospice for pilgrims, a theory supported by its location, close to the castle.

It is currently owned and managed by St John’s House Trust (Bridgend), a registered charity formed in 2012, which aims to preserve the historical, architectural and constructional heritage that may exist in and around St John's House, for the benefit of the local community. It is run by volunteers and is open to the public twice a month.
