= Pen-y-fai, Bridgend =

Village in Bridgend, Wales

Coordinates: 51°31′37″N 3°35′42″W

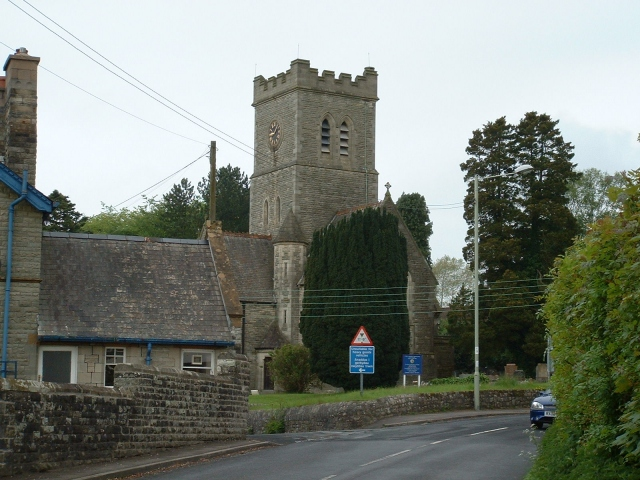
All Saints Church, Pen-y-fai, a Grade II-listed building

Pen-y-fai is a village in the county borough of Bridgend, Wales within the Bridgend electoral ward area and the community of Newcastle Higher. The ward population taken at the 2011 census was 2,447.

== Amenities ==
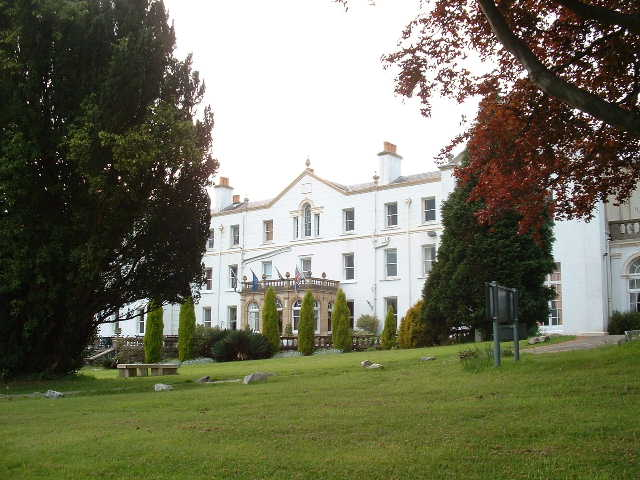
Court Colman Manor

It has a population of about 2,000, one village shop, a chapel and All Saints parish church (a Church in Wales). It also has a village pub, The Pheasant, which was once an old farmhouse. Pen-y-fai was once a village for employees of the Llewellyn estate. Pen-y-fai primary school takes children from age 3 through to age 11.

There are several playing fields in the village.

The village has a football (soccer) club, Pen-y-fai FC. It takes children from 6 to 16 years of age and plays as a member of Bridgend & District Football League, with teams in the mini-football and junior sections. Over 200 children are members of the club, making it one of the largest mini/junior clubs in the district.

Court Colman Manor, built in 1776, was the home of the Llewellyn family (of the Llewellyn estate). It eventually became an Edwardian gentlemen's residence, and it was later converted into a hotel.
