= Court Colman Manor =

Tudor mansion in Bridgend, South Wales

Coordinates: 51.5247°N 3.6106°W

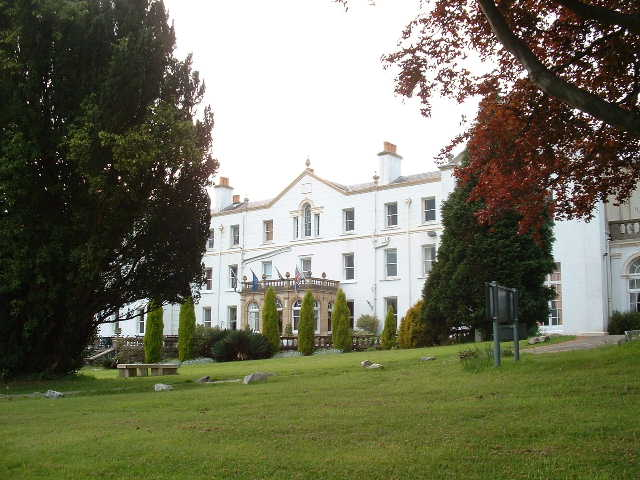
Court Colman Manor

Court Colman Manor is a historic Tudor mansion (now a hotel) in Pen-y-fai, Bridgend, South Wales. The property belonged to Margam Abbey until the Dissolution, after which it passed through several hands. It was built in 1766 by Hopkin Rees (1729–1780) and enlarged and modified in 1907 by Robert William Llewellyn (1848–1910).

== Early history ==
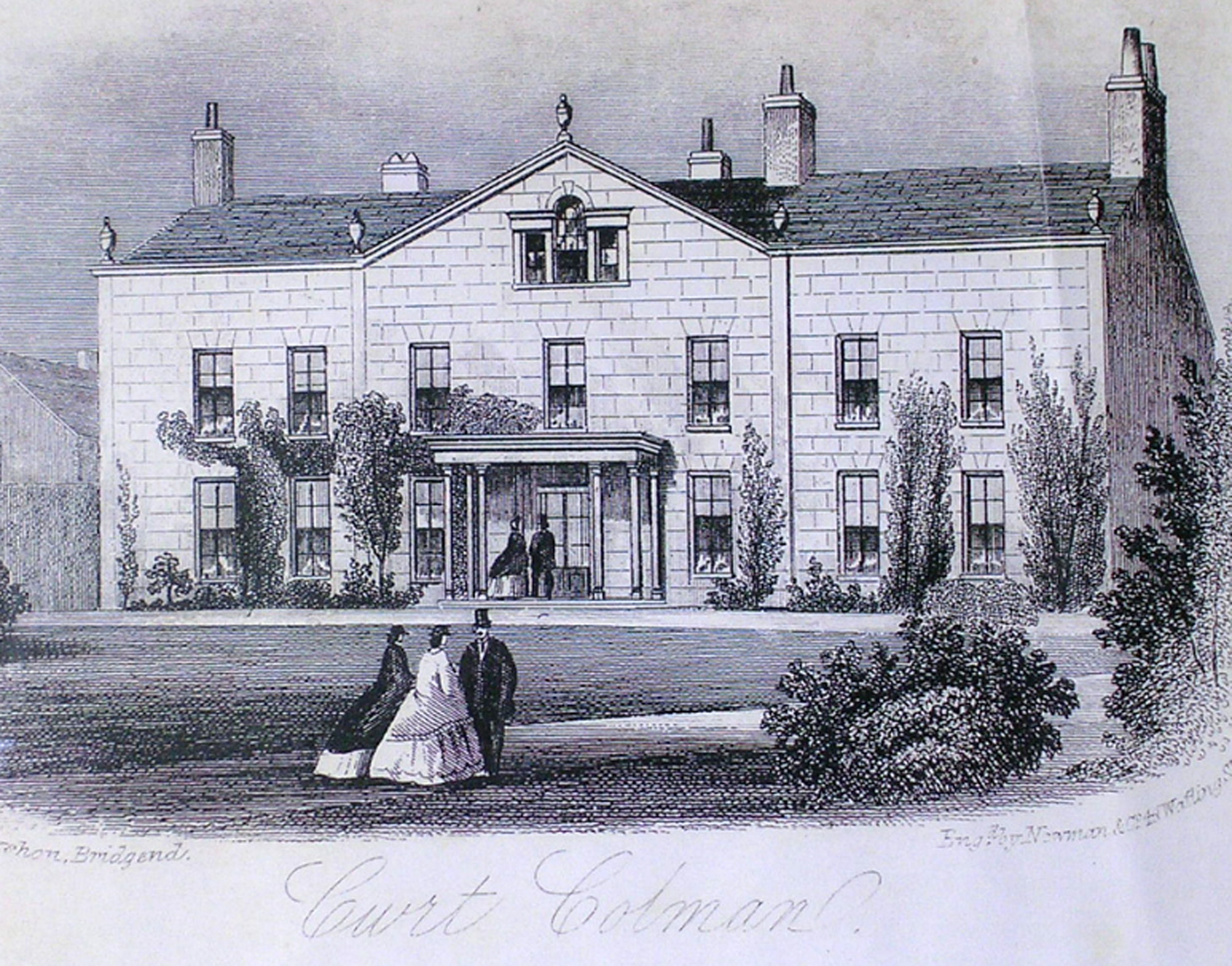
Court Colman in the early days.

There are records that the building could date back to Tudor times because in 1914 the local historian T. M Price described an old Tudor Gate which was at the end of a walled garden (now demolished) near the house bearing the date 1638 which he said was “direct evidence that the house which H. Rees erected in 1766 was on or near the site of a previous older house of 1638.” Price also stated that he thought that a wall of the West wing of the present house was part of this original Tudor house.

The Thomas family of Llanmigangel is thought to have erected the original 1638 mansion as it is known that about this time they had connections with the Court Colman estate. Also the original Tudor Gate bore the initials F. T. which was probably Francis Thomas. During the Civil War the property was given to John Watkins as a reward for his loyalty to the Parliamentary Cause led by Oliver Cromwell. He gave the house to his younger brother and after this Benjamin Watkins inherited the property.

Sometime after this Hopkin Rees (1687–1758) who was Sheriff of Glamorgan purchased the estate and after his death his son Hopkin Rees (1729–1780) inherited the house. His son William Rees died childless in 1820 and as he left no will there were extended legal proceedings about the rightful heir to the property. Eventually the house was sold to William Llewellyn in 1837.

== The Llewellyn family ==
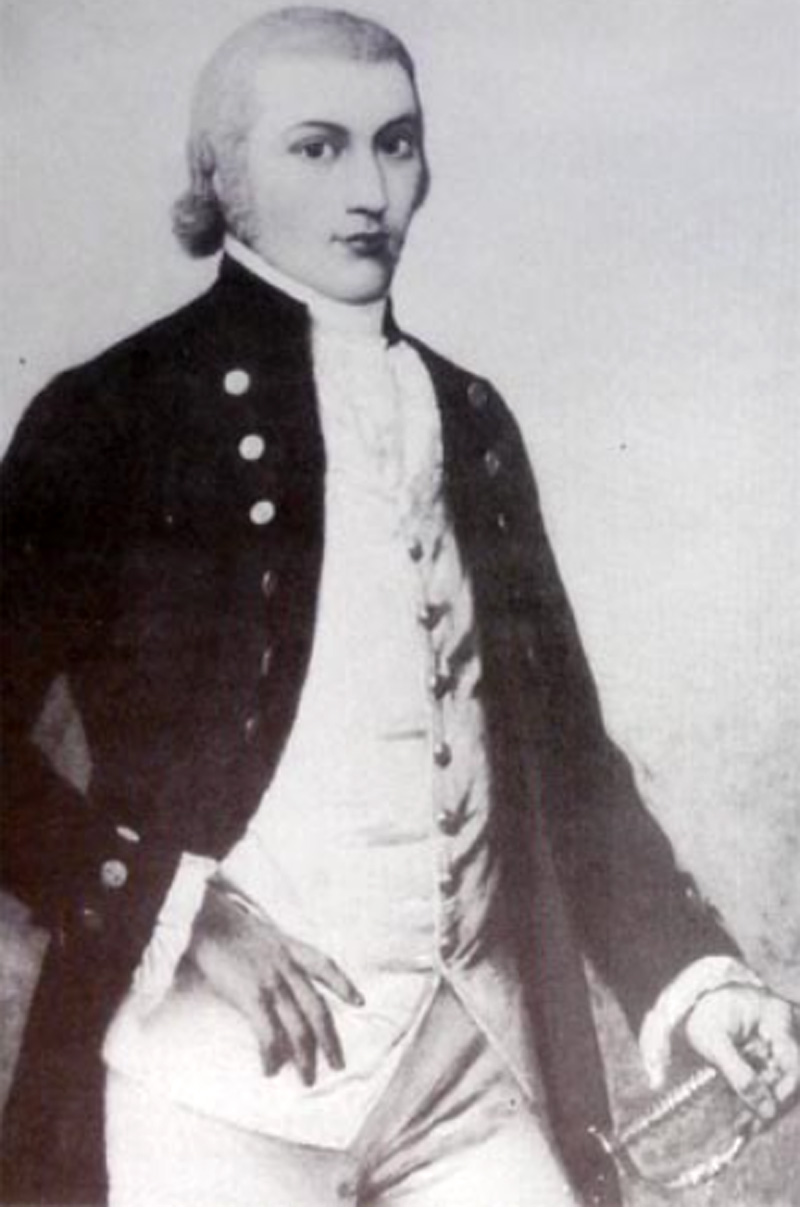
William Llewellyn (1773–1840)

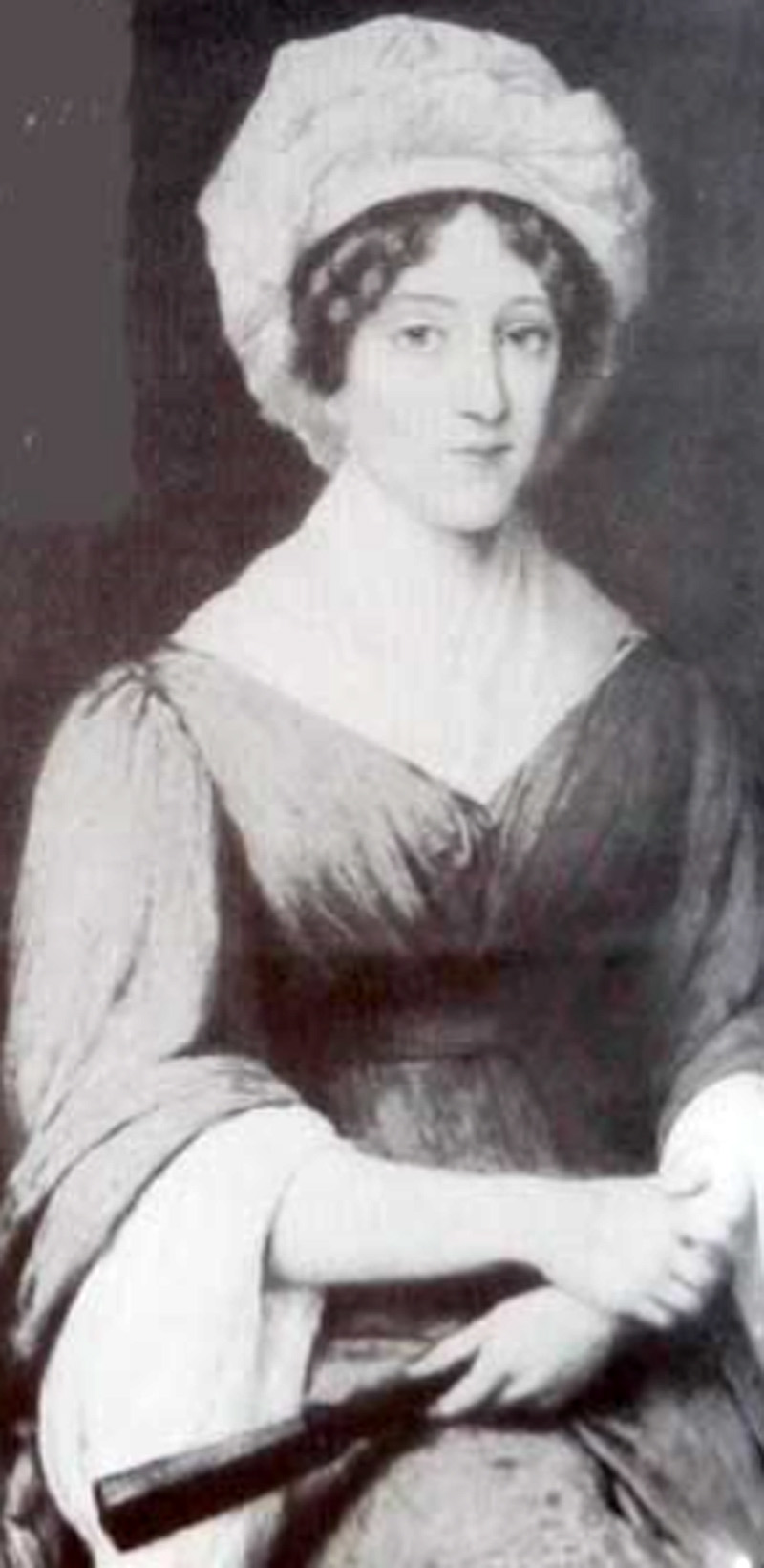
Catherine Llewellyn (born Place)

William Llewellyn (1773–1840) was born in 1773. His father was Hopkin Llewellyn of Brombil Margam. William became a surgeon in the Royal Navy and served with Vice Admiral Cuthbert Collingwood, at his personal request. In 1805 he was wounded and he left the Navy and established a medical practice in Taibach in Wales. In 1818 he married Catherine Place, daughter of Thomas Dumayne Place of Glyn Leiros, Neath. William purchased Court Colman in 1837, but did not live there as he died before the legal complications had been resolved. His son William inherited the property on his death 1840 and moved in the following year with his mother Catherine, until her death in 1848.

William Llewellyn (1820–1898) was born in Brombil, Margam in 1820. He was educated at Oxford University and at the age of 20 inherited the Court Colman Estate which he administered throughout his life. He became High Sheriff of Glamorgan in 1854. In 1844 he married Eleanor Emma Knight who was the daughter of Reverend Robert Knight of Tythegston Court near Bridgend. The couple had two sons and five daughters. One daughter and one of his sons died at a young age. The surviving children are shown in the photograph with William and Eleanor.

In 1898 William died and his son Robert William Llewellyn (1848–1910) inherited Court Colman. He was born in 1848. He was Justice of the Peace and Deputy Lieutenant of Glamorganshire. He was also Chairman of the Newcastle and Ogmore Petty Sessions. He built the Church of All Saints, Pen-y-fai in about 1900. In 1882 he married Harriet Annie Blandy daughter of William Blandy of Kingston Bagpuize House. She is shown in the photograph. The couple had four sons and two daughters.

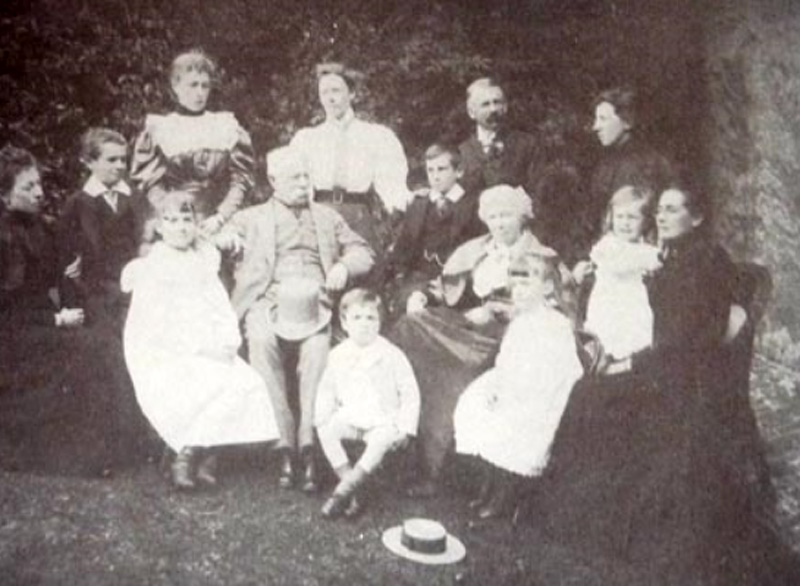
William and Eleanor Llewellyn with their four daughters and son Robert William. Robert William's wife Harriet is on the extreme right.

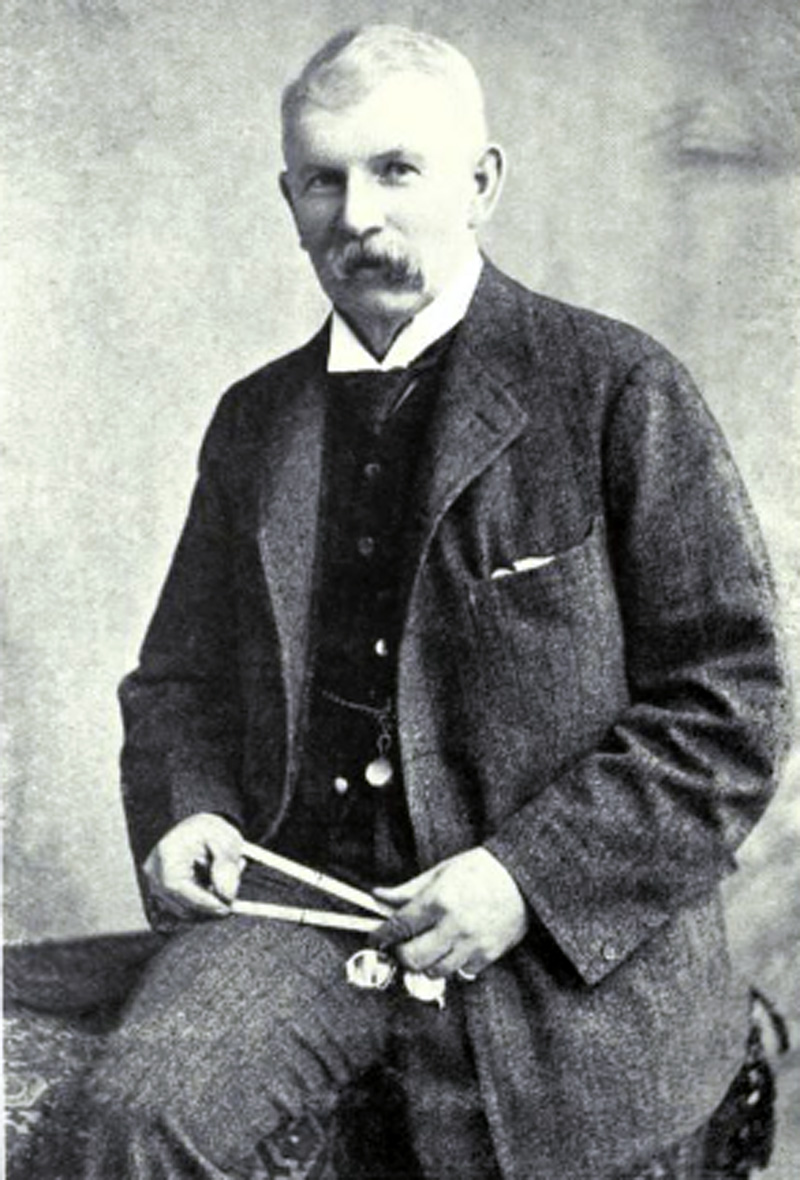
Robert William Llewellyn.

In 1906 Robert made extensive alterations to Court Colman which were described by the historian T. M. Price in the following terms.

"Very important in the history of Court Colman were the years 1906 and 1907, for during that period very considerable and extensive alterations were carried out, greatly improving its residential qualities and out- lines. Previous to these alterations and restoration the site now occupied by the east wing of the house and the conservatory were taken up by stables and out-buildings; while where the west wing is now erected was an old ruined building much out of repair, evidently a part of which was originally a portion of the old Tudor mansion ages ago. The greater part of the central portion of the present main front of the house existed prior to 1907, but the roof was then raised, and some additional windows were erected on the second storey, and the stables and old western wing of the house were demolished and additional wings were added at both the eastern and western ends of the house, thus imparting to the main front the fine stately appearance which it has at the present time. During the alterations the old entrance porch was re- moved, and a new porch surmounted by a balustraded balcony was erected in its place."

Robert died in 1910 and his son Colonel William Herbert Clydwyn Llewellyn inherited the property. He was born in 1883 and in 1909 married Dorothy Louisa Carwithen of Ashprington House in Devon. The couple had five children four sons and one daughter. He sold Court Colman in 1961. The house was bought by a retired headmaster of a Preparatory School in Bridgend but Mr G Morgan let the house become dilapidated.

In 1981 Court Colman Manor was turned into a hotel. The lodges (Church Lodge and School Lodge) have now become private dwellings, and the school is now a nursery. The estate park surrounding the house is designated at Grade II on the Cadw/ICOMOS Register of Parks and Gardens of Special Historic Interest in Wales.
