= Cynffig/Kenfig SSSI =

Protected area in Glamorgan, Wales

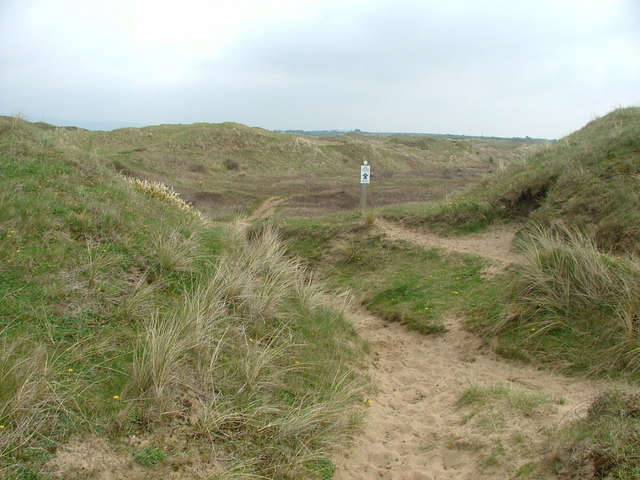
Kenfig Burrows

Cynffig/Kenfig is a Site of Special Scientific Interest which includes Kenfig Sands and its sand dunes near Kenfig in Bridgend County Borough, South Wales. The Kenfig National Nature Reserve is also situated at the site and contains the largest lake in Glamorgan, Kenfig Pool.

== Geography ==
The Cynffig/Kenfig site is located near the village of Kenfig in Bridgend. The Kenfig National Nature Reserve is located at the site and is the location of Kenfig Pool, the largest lake in Glamorgan. The site is managed by Natural Resources Wales and Bridgend County Borough Council.

The site was designated as a Site of Special Scientific Interest by the Joint Nature Conservation Committee (JNCC). Its reasons for listing included "Fixed coastal dunes with herbaceous vegetation" (a primary feature of the site), along with other dune related features. It also has growths of petalwort and fen orchids which aided its elevation to protected status. The JNCC report states that sand dunes make up the majority of the site (63%). The next highest accumulation is for larger bodies of water, such as tidal rivers, estuaries, mud flats, sand flats and lagoons. The remainder of the site is made up of smaller bodies of water, cliffs, woodland and other plant life. The site also contains salt marshes which are deemed to be rare in the Glamorgan area.

== History ==
In its early history, the dunes were part of a continuous stretch of dunes, reaching from the estuary of the River Ogmore to the Gower Peninsula.

In medieval times, the area was grazed by cattle. These largely disappeared before slowly being reintroduced in the 21st century. There is also a significant population of rabbits at the site.

== See also ==
- List of Sites of Special Scientific Interest in Mid & South Glamorgan
