= Kenfig Pool =

- Cynffig (Welsh)
- The Kenfig Pool at Sunset

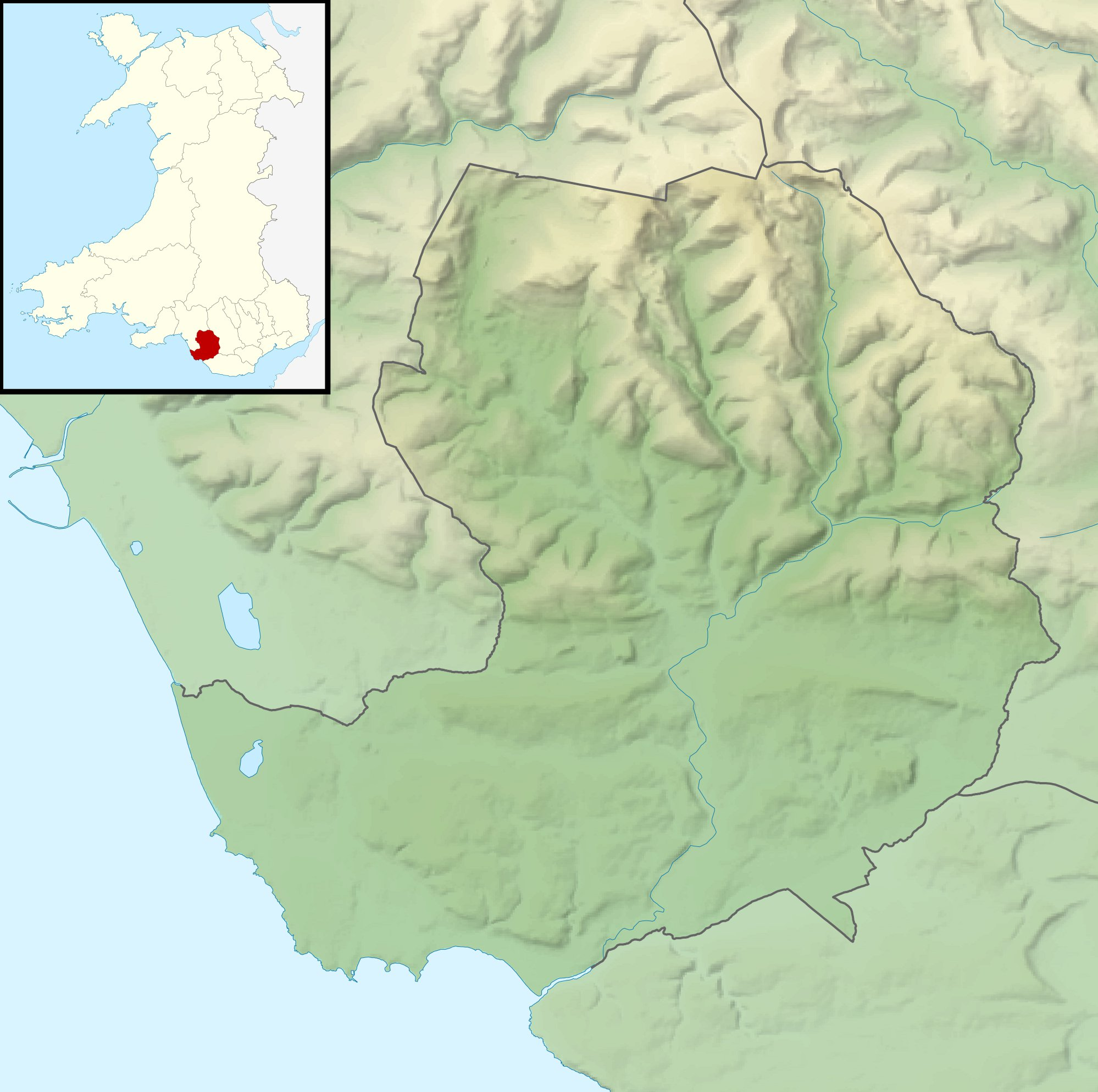
- Location within Bridgend Location within Wales
- Interactive map of Kenfig Pool
- Location: Porthcawl, Bridgend
- Coordinates: 51.5194°N 3.7362°W
- Type: Freshwater lake
- Part of: Kenfig National Nature Reserve
- Basin countries: Wales
- Managing agency: Kenfig Corporation Trust
- Designation: Site of Special Scientific Interest; National nature reserve
- Surface area: 28.3 hectares (70 acres)
- Max. depth: 3.6 metres (12 ft)
- Website: Official website

Kenfig Pool (Welsh: Pwll Cynffig) is a national nature reserve situated near Porthcawl, Bridgend. Wild storms and huge tides between the 13th and 15th centuries are mainly responsible for creating the Kenfig dunes near Porthcawl, as they threw vast quantities of sand up over the Glamorgan coast. This buried the nearby borough of Kenfig, and its castle, of which only the ruined keep survives. At 28.3 hectares (70 acres) the second largest (after Llangorse Lake) freshwater lake in south Wales. Kenfig Pool lies at the heart of the national nature reserve and is a valuable stopping point for migrating birds. The lake's maximum depth is about 3.6 metres (12 ft). An island, built by the aristocrats living in nearby Margam to encourage wildfowl (which they would shoot) to nest there, has long since sunk beneath the waters.

== History ==
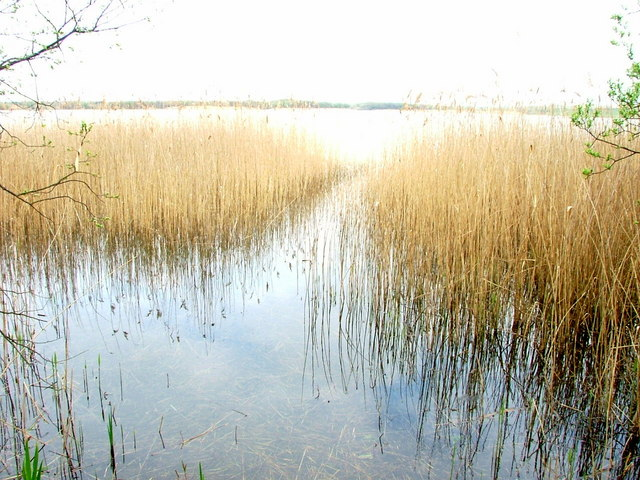
Reeds at the southern fringes of the lake supply an important feeding habitat for many birds and other creatures

There are several theories about how the pool was formed. An old, yet popular theory claims that the lake was created during a "sinking of the land" in a massive earthquake, but has since been rejected as downright bizarre. Recently, a paper written at Cardiff University claims that before the spreading of the sand dunes, the River Kenfig flowed southward, its natural mouth being near Sker Rocks at the south end of Kenfig beach, and that the pool was a remainder of this. A more likely theory, put forward by researchers in collaboration with the Kenfig Society, also says how the lake was formed. The western boundary of the borough of Kenfig was marked by a stream called the Blaklaak. Although it had by then been covered by the sands, a document dating from 1360 states that it had flowed from the "southern water of Kenfig" (Kenfig Pool) to the "northern water" (most likely the River Kenfig). The Blaklaak was undoubtedly an outlet stream of the lake, which local lore claims is fed by seven springs, although by now these would most likely have dried up.

== Legend ==
Like the whole area of Kenfig, myth and mystery surround Kenfig Pool. According to local legend, the lake is bottomless and fed by seven springs. Unwary people who travel into the lake would be caught up in a whirlpool which would drag them to their death.

The most significant, and most believed, legend tells that a city lay beneath the water. When historian Rhys Merrick visited during the time of Elizabeth I, and enquired about a lost medieval town in the vicinity, some told him (correctly) that it lay near the castle, but others said it had "sinked and become a great mere" - Kenfig Pool. The story goes that a vast and prosperous city lay beneath the lake. Once, as the daughter of the local lord was searching for a husband, a man won her heart. However, her father would not let them be married because he was so poor, and not of noble birth. The man left the town to seek his fortune, and returned months later. The lord's steward was also passing that day laden with the silver and gold collected from the villagers. The young man leapt out from a bush, killed him and took the money. He then went on to marry the lord's daughter, without anyone connecting his newfound wealth with the murder.

On the night of the wedding, a wind blew through the town, screaming that "vengeance will come" in the "ninth generation". Life carried on regardless, until a baby was born of the ninth generation (the great-great-great-great-great-great-grandson of the murderer and the lord's daughter). That night, a similar wind blew through the city, crying "vengeance is come!". In the morning, when the country folk rushed to Kenfig, they found nothing left of the city, and a huge lake in its place. Three chimneys stood in the middle of the lake, belching noxious fumes. To this day, they are said to reappear before a storm in which seafarers will die in the local area. Others say that the bell of the church can sometimes be heard tolling sadly under the lake. Fisherman are said to have had their lines broken by the city's walls, and stories are told of one landowner who died when his horse tripped on such a wall, sending him to his doom in the lake. Legend says that swimmers should not to swim in the southwest of the lake, where the so-called Black Gutter lies.
