= Merthyr Mawr =

Village and community in Bridgend, Wales

- Village and community
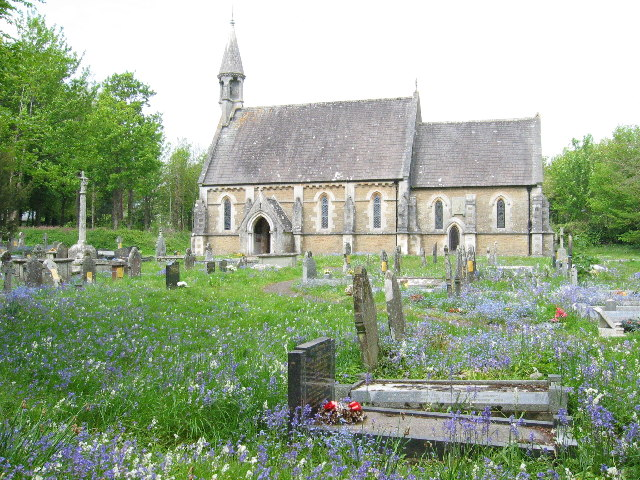
- Merthyr Mawr Church. A medieval cross is to the left of the church

- Location within Bridgend
- Principal area: Bridgend
- Country: Wales
- Sovereign state: United Kingdom
- Police: South Wales
- Fire: South Wales
- Ambulance: Welsh
- List of places UK Wales Bridgend Map of the community

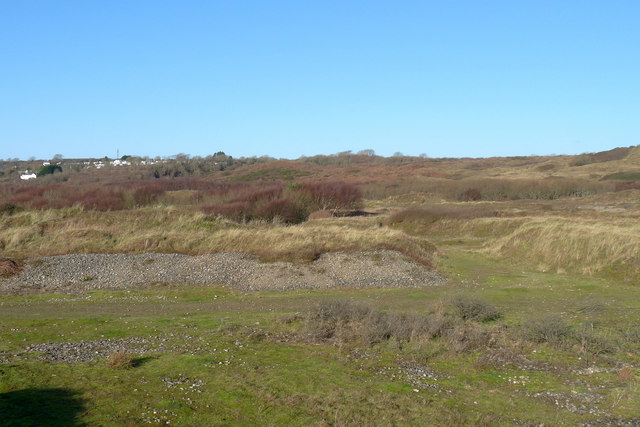
Dunes of Merthyr Mawr Warren

Merthyr Mawr is a village and community in Bridgend, Wales. The village is about 2 1/2 miles from the centre of Bridgend town. The population of the community at the 2011 census was 267. The community occupies the area west of the Ewenny River, between Bridgend and Porthcawl. It takes in the settlement of Tythegston and a stretch of coastal sand dunes known as Merthyr Mawr Warren. It is in the historic county of Glamorgan.

== Buildings and landmarks of note ==
Merthyr Mawr House is an early 19th-century mansion built by Sir John Nicholl and set in an extensive park. The park is designated at Grade II* on the Cadw/ICOMOS Register of Parks and Gardens of Special Historic Interest in Wales. Within the park is the Iron Age hillfort known as Chapel Hill Camp, and within the embankments is the now roofless 15th century chapel of St Roque (or Roch), which houses two early medieval inscribed stones.

Merthyr Mawr is largely an estate village for the House. It now contains several cottages retaining thatched roofs and well maintained gardens. At the south end of the village is the parish church of St Teilo, which was built in 1849–51 to a design by Benjamin Ferrey and John Pritchard, on an ancient medieval site. A collection of stones from the former churchyard and the surrounding area are displayed in a shelter in the churchyard.

Nearby are the Merthyr Mawr Sand Dunes. Candleston Castle is on the edge of the area of dunes. Mike Young Productions children's cartoon studio is located in Merthyr Mawr.

The River Ogmore flows through the village and a famous sheep dipping bridge crosses it on the outskirts of the village. The former POW Camp Island Farm is less than a mile away. The Ewenny River forms the southern boundary of both the community and the borough. The villages of Ewenny and Ogmore-by-Sea are both on the southern bank of the Ewenny, along with Ogmore Castle.

== Scheduled Monuments ==
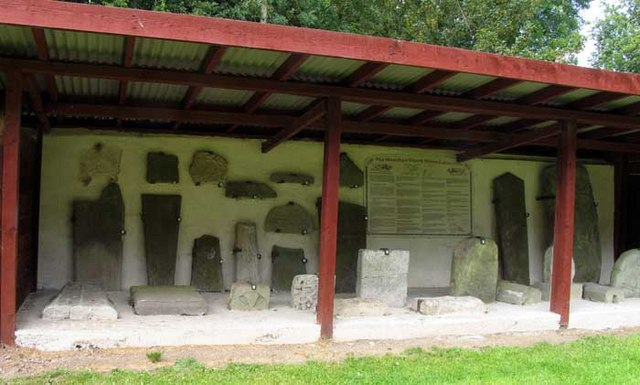
Celtic stones at St Teilo Churchyard

There are large number of archaeological sites in the Community area, showing habitation from Neolithic times, and intensive occupation since Roman times. Thirteen sites are Scheduled Monuments, which gives them legal protection from disturbance:-

- Tythegston Long Barrow (51.5008°N 3.6371°W, SS864792). A Neolithic chambered tomb toward the east end of a long mound.
- Mynydd Herbert Round Barrow (51.5057°N 3.6564°W, SS851798) A Bronze Age burial cairn 2m high covered in stones, possibly cleared from nearby fields, in the corner of a field 1 km north of Tythegston.
- Chapel Hill Camp (51.4906°N 3.6018°W, SS889780) A small Iron Age hillfort on a low hilltop. The ruins of St Roques chapel, lying within the enclosure, gives its name to the hill.

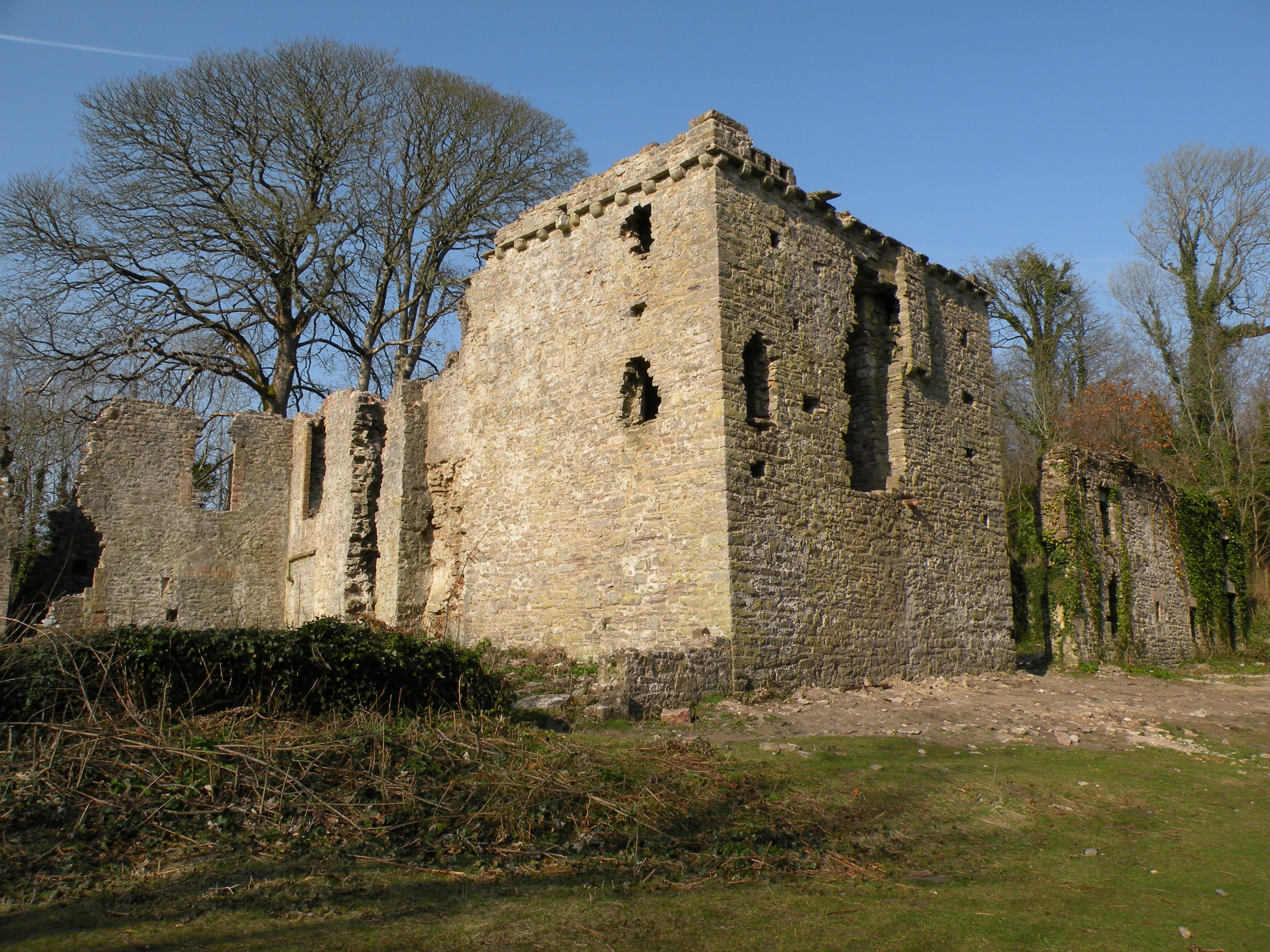
Candleston Castle

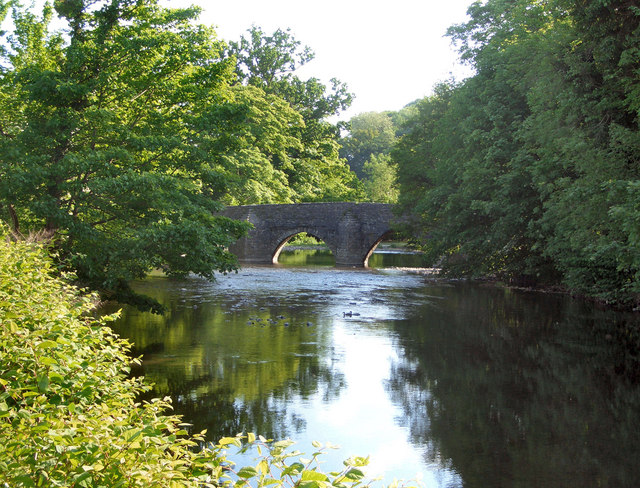
The Ogmore River and New Inn Bridge

- Merthyr Mawr Warren (51.4813°N 3.6386°W, SS863770) An area of dunes within which numerous prehistoric burial sites and other findspots have been uncovered, especially during sand and gravel extraction.
- Cae Summerhouse Camp (51.4894°N 3.6375°W, SS864779). A settlement site with intensive 1st to 4th century occupation in a defended enclosure, covering the Iron Age & Roman periods.
- Merthyr Mawr pre-Norman Stones (51.4856°N 3.6105°W, SS882775) A series of locally found early medieval stone pillars, slabs and crosses, now housed in a shelter within Merthyr Mawr St Teilo churchyard.
- Vervil Dyke (51.4848°N 3.6014°W, SS889774) A bank and ditch runs between the rivers Ogmore and Eweny. Traces of a parallel bank imply a settlement enclosure of early medieval date.
- Cross in Tythegston Churchyard (51.4967°N 3.6471°W, SS857788) An 11th-century sandstone slab set in a modern socket, in St Tudwg's churchyard, Tythegsto.
- St Roque's Chapel (51.4908°N 3.6021°W, SS888780) A ruined medieval chapel, sited inside Chapel Hill Camp, within the park of Merthyr Mawr House.
- Conbelani Stone in St Roque's Chapel (51.4908°N 3.6021°W, SS888780) An inscribed pillar cross, originally on the river bank at Merthyr Mawr. Another cross pillar, the Goblin Stone, is also in the ruined chapel.
- Candleston Castle (51.4829°N 3.6269°W, SS871772) A lightly fortified 14th century manor house overlooking Merthyr Mawr Warren, which continued in occupation until the 19th century.
- Merthyr Mawr Churchyard Cross (51.4853°N 3.6103°W, SS882774) An octagonal 14th century cross pillar with part of its original finial, set in three steps of sandstone.
- New Inn Bridge (51.4936°N 3.5989°W, SS891783) A Stone bridge in the parish, but near Bridgend. It has 4 arches, and is dated to the 16th century or older. Two openings allow sheep washing, giving an alternate name of 'Dipping Bridge'.

== National nature reserve ==
The sand dune system known as Merthyr Mawr warren is a scheduled National Nature Reserve. It contains the highest sand-dunes in Wales and is notable for its floristic and animal communities including rare plants. It has also been the site of many archaeological finds.

== See also ==
- Bryntirion, Laleston and Merthyr Mawr
- List of Scheduled Monuments in Bridgend
