= Tythegston =

Coordinates: 51.4971468°N 3.6581938°W

Welsh: Llandudwg
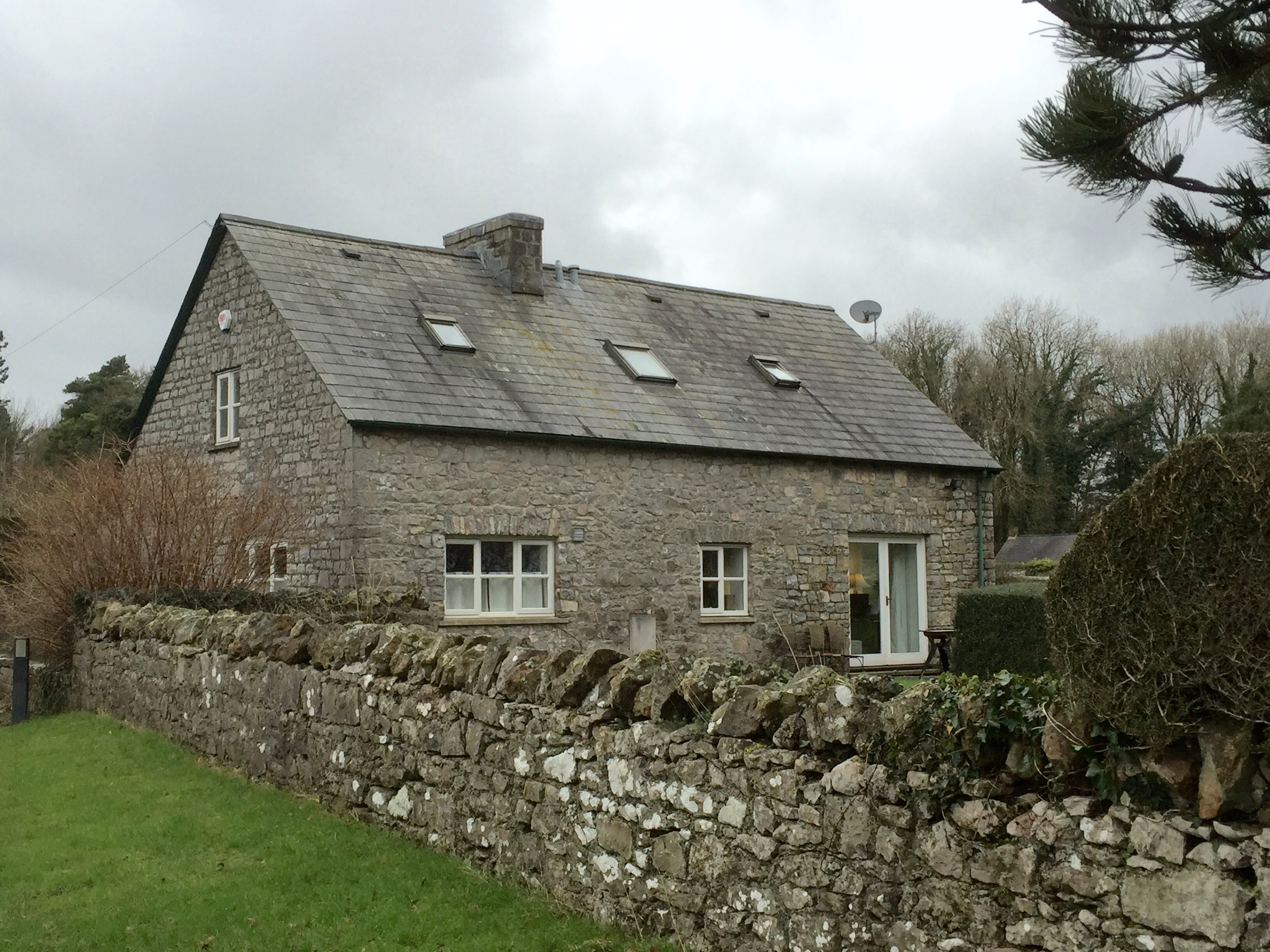
- A cottage at Tythegston

- Location within Bridgend
- OS grid reference: SS 8579
- Principal area: Bridgend
- Country: Wales
- Sovereign state: United Kingdom
- Post town: Bridgend
- Postcode district: CF32
- Dialling code: 01656
- Police: South Wales
- Fire: South Wales
- Ambulance: Welsh
- UK Parliament: Bridgend
- Senedd Cymru – Welsh Parliament: Bridgend

Tythegston (Welsh: Llandudwg) is a conservation area village located (M4 J37 3 miles) close to Cardiff (24 miles) and Swansea (19 miles) on the south coast of Bridgend, Wales. It is home to Tythegston Court, a Grade II listed manor house at the centre of the 1,200 acre Tythegston Estate which is designated at Grade II on the Cadw/ICOMOS Register of Parks and Gardens of Special Historic Interest in Wales. The estate has been owned by the Knight family for some 350 years and operates as a farming and property enterprise, with an industrial estate, as well as hosting green energy and food production. The seaside town of Porthcawl, with its numerous beaches is within 3 miles, as is Bridgend inter-city rail station (London hourly express train c.2hrs 10mins). The village covers an area of 2,871 acres (1,162 ha). It is part of the community of Merthyr Mawr.

== History ==
The parish name comes from the patron saint of the village church, St Tudwg, one of the disciples of the hermit Cenydd, and is derived from its ancient Welsh appellation, Llan Dudwg, meaning "Dudwg's Town". Its English name has been spelt in different ways, including Tedegestowe (13th century), Tegestowe (14th century), Dythyston (15th century), Tythegston and Tithexton (16th century). The Welsh name has been spelt as: Llandudock (15th century) and Landidwg (16th century). There is evidence to suggest that a Roman villa was once constructed in or near the village. Bronze Age remains (which include a barrow and a cremation) have been found in the area.

=== Medieval ===
The parish was absorbed into the territory of Newcastle with the Norman appropriation of the Glamorgan lowlands. Tythegston was constituted as a sub-manor sometime around the late 13th or early 14th century. In 1870–72 the Imperial Gazetteer of England and Wales by John Marius Wilson described Tythegston as:

TYTHEGSTON, a parish, with two hamlets, in Bridgend district, Glamorgan; 4 miles W by S of Bridgend r. station. Post town, Bridgend. Acres, 2,871. Real property, £3,602. Pop. in 1851, 1,152; in 1861, 1,678. Houses, 340. The increase of pop. arose from extension of collieries, and of coke and iron works. The property is divided among a few. The living is a p. curacy, annexed to Newcastle. The church is good.

== Geography ==
Tythegston is located in the southern part of Bridgend in South Wales, 3.5 miles (5.6 km) west of Bridgend, its nearest town and lies to the north side of the A4106 road. The village covers an area of 2,871 acres (1,162 ha), of which 278 acres (113 ha) are of common land or waste. By road Tythegston is situated 20 miles (32 km) southeast of Swansea and 23 miles (37 km) west of the capital city Cardiff. The landscape is dominated by farms and woodland such as Tythegston Church.

== Governance ==
At the national level Tythegston is in the Welsh parliamentary constituency of Bridgend, for which Madeleine Moon of the Labour Party was MP from 2005 to 2019. In the general election of 2019, the Conservative Party captured the seat and Jamie Wallis is the current MP.

In the Senedd Tythegston is in the constituency of Bridgend for which Carwyn Jones, the First Minister of Wales, was the Member of the Senedd from 1999 to 2021. For European elections Tythegston was in the Wales constituency until Brexit.

== Notable landmarks ==
The present church, St Tudwg, is of 11th century design. It was deconsecrated in around 1990. St Tudwg was converted into offices in 2010 after a four-year restoration project. In the Glamorgan Archives in Cardiff a book of the registers contains baptisms from 1758, burials from 1766 and marriages starting from 1837; marriages ended until 1965, baptisms and burials to 1987. Tythegston includes one Grade II building, in addition to one Grade II* building. The Tythegston Court estate is designated at Grade II on the Cadw/ICOMOS Register of Parks and Gardens of Special Historic Interest in Wales.
