= Kenfig =

Village in Bridgend, Wales

Coordinates: 51°30′55″N 3°43′38″W

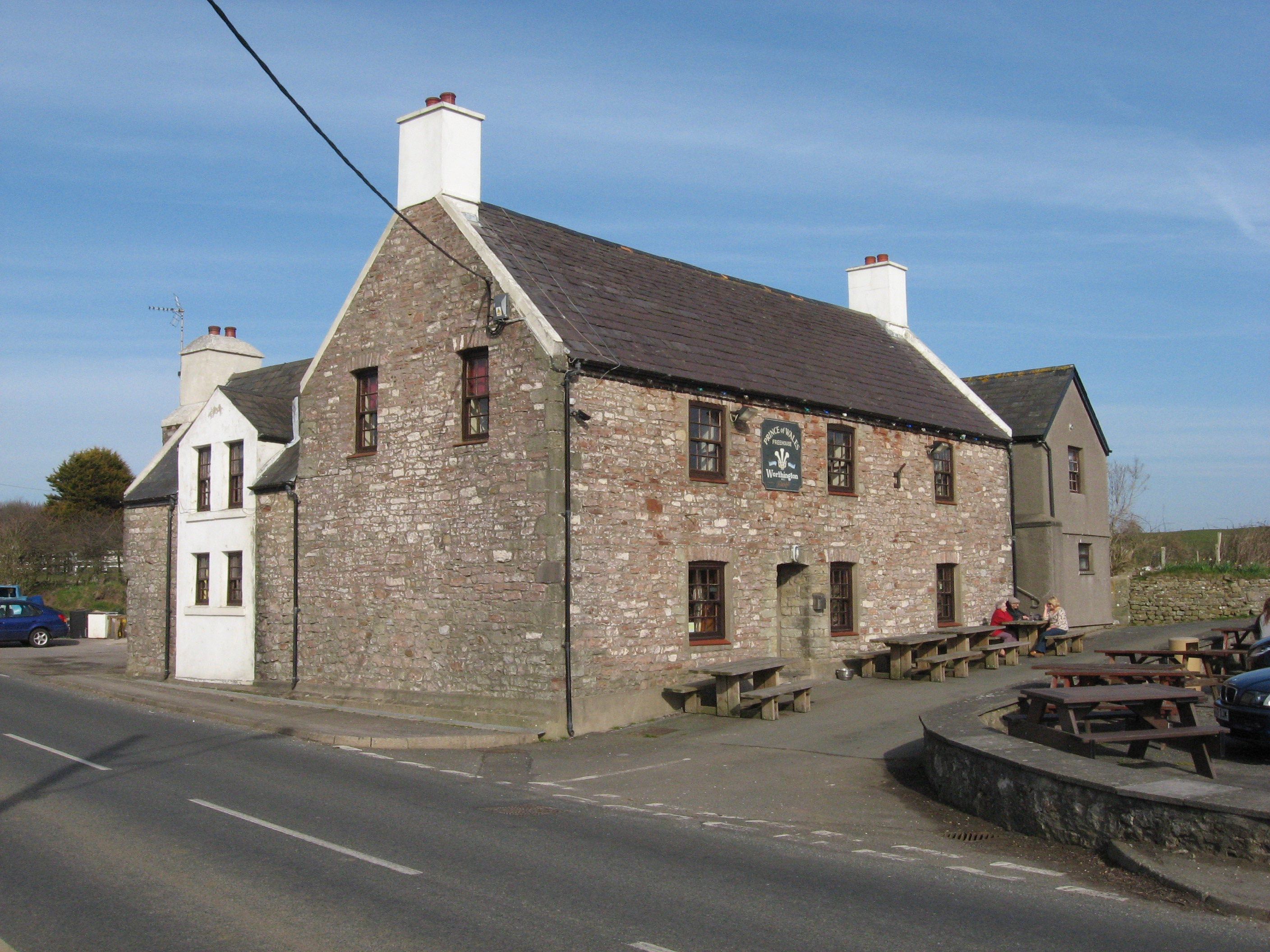
The Prince of Wales Inn

Kenfig (Welsh: Cynffig) is a village and former borough in Bridgend, Wales. It is situated 1 mile (2 km) inland on the north bank of the Bristol Channel, and just south-west of the M4 motorway. To the east is the town of Bridgend, at approximately 6 miles (10 km), and the capital city of Cardiff, at 24 miles (39 km). To the west lies Port Talbot, at approximately 7 miles (11 km), and Swansea at approximately 18 miles (29 km).

== Geography ==
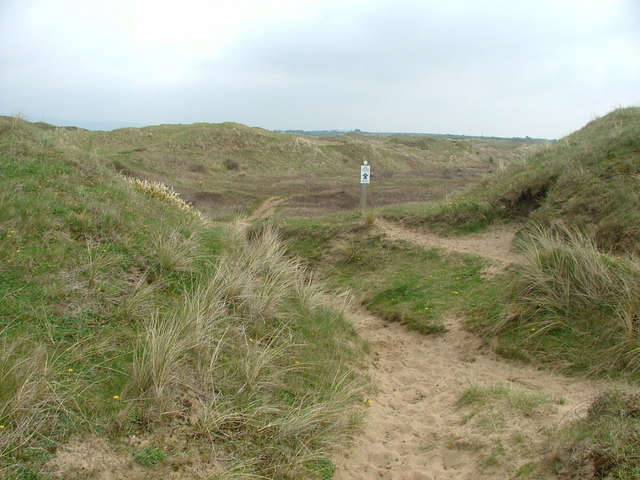
Kenfig Burrows

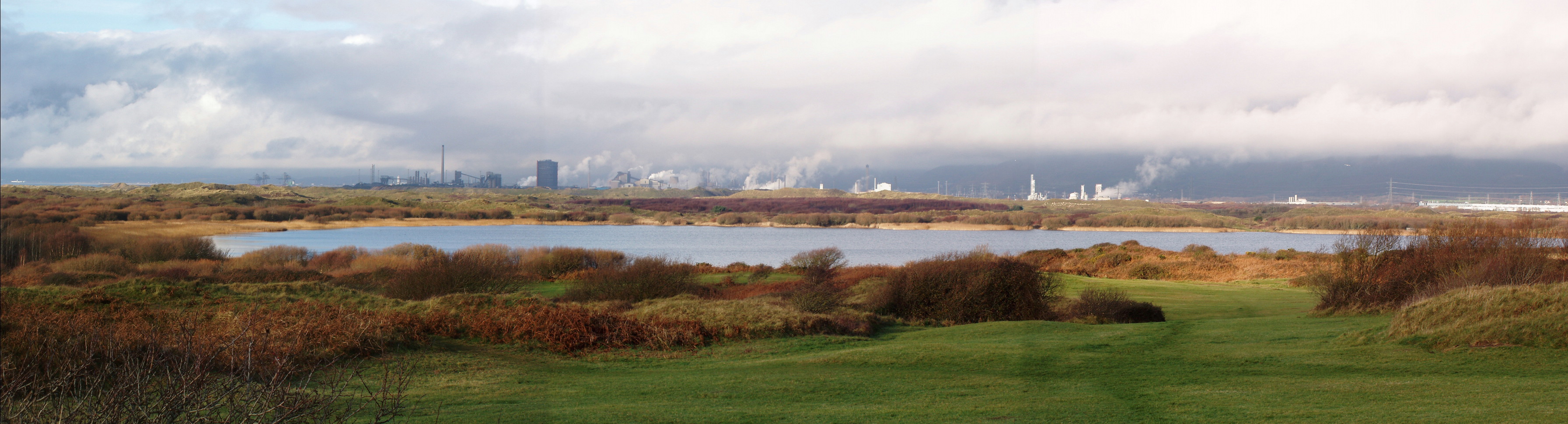
Kenfig Pool

The area of sand dunes and the pool at Kenfig are managed by Bridgend County Borough Council as Kenfig Pool National Nature Reserve, the area designated a Site of Special Scientific Interest. The reserve has a visitor and interpretation centre, and a car park. The dunes are home to a variety of rare and endangered species of plants and animals, including a high concentration of fen orchid (or Liparis loeselii). The current village, built further inland, is a continuation of the mediaeval one. Landmarks include ruins of Kenfig Castle.

The Kenfig Burrows beach is used by naturists.

== History ==
The village was established in the 12th century and was situated around Kenfig Castle. The encroaching sand caused by intensive cattle grazing and increasing temperatures due to the Medieval Warm Period made habitation of the area difficult and by the 14th century most of the fields and buildings were unusable. The village was abandoned by 1650. The church was moved from the original village stone by stone and currently stands in the village of Pyle, where the relocation is evident by smaller stones at the bottom of the church, with larger ones above. The earlier settlement was the subject of an episode of the archaeological television programme Time Team, screened on 11 March 2012.

The borough contributed with other Glamorgan towns to sending a member of parliament to Westminster until the Reform Act 1832. The municipal ceremonial mace is in the National Museum of Wales, but a pewter copy is held in the Prince of Wales Inn, a pub and Grade II-listed inn, which was built in the 17th century and over the years has served as town hall, courthouse, and a mortuary for sailors whose bodies washed ashore on nearby beaches.

In 1940, work commenced on a calcium carbide plant at Kenfig, built for the Ministry of Supply and operated by British Industrial Solvents, a subsidiary of the Distillers Company. Calcium carbide was a vital raw material for acetylene production. The Kenfig plant closed in 1966, overtaken by cheaper methods of producing acetylene from the catalytic cracking of oil and foreign competitors lower electricity costs.

In 1968, BorgWarner opened a plant at Kenfig for the manufacture of automatic transmissions. In January 1976 the plant completed its two millionth gearbox, which was 'presented' to A B Volvo. At that time a press release stated that Borg-Warner's UK plants at Letchworth and at Kenfig were producing transmissions for use in more than fifty different car models, and that more than half the gearboxes produced were exported outside the UK. In 2001 the factory faced the threat of closure but was saved by a new contract from Korean car company Kia. In December 2008 Borg-Warner announced that the plant would finally close by mid-2010 with the loss of all 110 jobs at the site; a statement from the company blamed the economic downturn for the decision.

In 2009, two Grob Tutor T1 aircraft collided in mid-air and crashed in the nature reserve, killing both pilots and two teenage air cadets.

== In literature ==
Kenfig local legend, folklore, and Sker House inspired the novel The Maid of Sker by R. D. Blackmore.

== See also ==
- Cynffig, a former local government community
- Kenfig Pool
- River Kenfig
