= Kenfig Castle =

Ruins of castle in Wales

Coordinates: 51.5303°N 3.7300°W

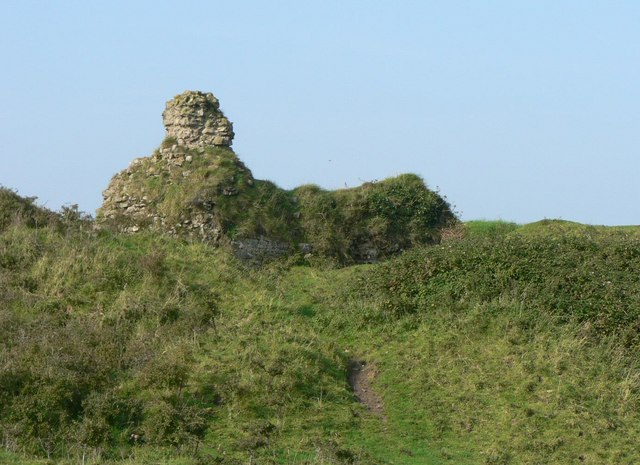
Ruins of Kenfig Castle

Kenfig Castle (Welsh: Castell Cynffig) is a ruined castle in Bridgend County Borough in Wales that came to prominence after the Anglo-Norman invasion of Wales in the late 11th century.

== History ==
An early reference to a castle at Kenfig can be found in 1080, when Iestyn ap Gwrgan was said to have refortified it, but probably this was a different structure to that raised alongside the town that developed there in the mid-12th century. In its day, it was an important Norman stronghold and was built by Robert, Earl of Gloucester, in the early 12th century. It was set on a mound with the river to the west and north. The 14 m (46 ft) square, free-standing keep had an entrance at the southwest corner. It was a tall, elegant structure with buttresses of dressed stone at each corner and the centre of each side, as well as a hall and offices. The bailey lies to the south, surrounded by the remains of a bank and ditch. The castle acted as an administrative centre, and by 1183, a borough had grown up to the south.

The castle was sacked by the Welsh on at least six occasions, in 1167, 1183, 1232, 1242, 1294, and 1295, by Morgan ap Maredudd during the revolt of Madog ap Llywelyn, and again in 1316 during the revolt of Llywelyn Bren. In the early 14th century, the castle was substantially reconstructed. The ramparts were removed to make the court more level and a curtain wall was erected, with a large gatehouse leading to the borough. The tower was also substantially rebuilt.

By the late 15th century, both Kenfig old town and the castle had been abandoned because of encroaching sand dunes. John Leland wrote in about 1539, "There is a little village on the e[a]st side of Kenfig, and a castle, booth in ruine and almost shokid (choked) and devourid with the sandes that the Severn Se ther castiith up".

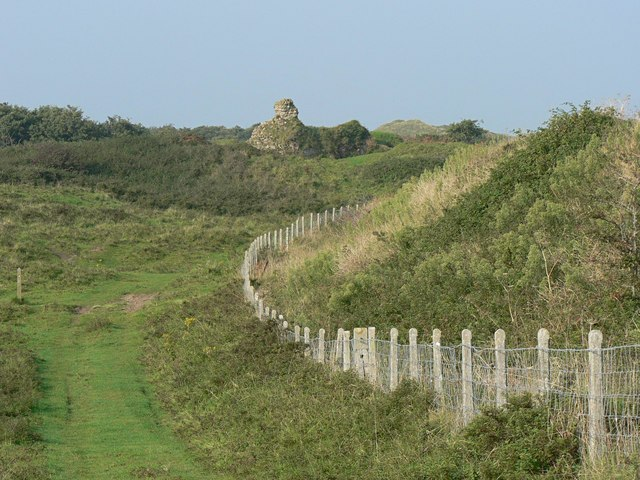
Kenfig Castle. The top of the keep is all that emerges from the dunes of Kenfig Burrows.

In the 1920s and early 1930s, much of the sand was excavated as an archaeological dig. The sands reinvaded the site and only the top of the keep is now visible.

== See also ==
- List of Scheduled Monuments in Bridgend
- List of castles in Wales
- Castles in Great Britain and Ireland
