= 1985 Mid Glamorgan County Council election =

Local election in Wales

The 1985 Mid Glamorgan County Council election was held in May 1985 and were the fourth full elections to Mid Glamorgan County Council, electing 85 councillors. They were preceded by the 1981 elections and followed by the 1989 elections.

== Ward results ==
=== Aberdare No.1: Llwydcoed (two seats) ===
Aberdare No.1: Llwydcoed 1985
Party	Candidate	Votes	%	±%
Labour	D. Davies	1,906		
Labour	Mervyn Prowle *	1,820		
Plaid Cymru	G. Jones	1,309		
Conservative	E. Evans	422		
Turnout			42.5	
Labour hold		Swing		
Labour hold		Swing		

=== Aberdare No.2: Blaengwawr (one seat) ===
Aberdare No.2: Blaengwawr 1985
Party	Candidate	Votes	%	±%
Labour	B. Fitzgerald	1,738		
Plaid Cymru	P. Davies	1,264		
Majority				
Turnout				
Labour gain from Plaid Cymru		Swing		

=== Aberdare No.3: Gadlys (one seat) ===
Aberdare No.3: Gadlys 1985
Party	Candidate	Votes	%	±%
Labour	V. Llywellyn*	913		
Conservative	R. Pittard	387		
Majority				
Turnout			34.0	
Labour hold		Swing		

=== Aberdare No.4: Town (one seat) ===
Aberdare No.4: Town 1985
Party	Candidate	Votes	%	±%
Independent	P. Williams*	818		
Labour	T. Llewellyn	659		
Majority				
Turnout			43.9	
Independent hold		Swing		

=== Aberdare No.5: Aberaman (one seat) ===
Aberdare No.5: Aberaman 1985
Party	Candidate	Votes	%	±%
Labour	R. Reed*	1,458		
Plaid Cymru	H. Davies	859		
Majority				
Turnout				
Labour hold		Swing		

=== Abertridwr and Senghennydd ===
Abertridwr and Senghennydd 1985
Party	Candidate	Votes	%	±%
Labour	R. Phillips	905		
Ratepayers	J. Davies	877		
Plaid Cymru	A. Whittle	281		
Liberal	M. Cooper	276		
Majority				
Turnout			42.3	
Labour gain from Independent		Swing		

=== Bedwas and Machen (two seats) ===
Bedwas and Machen 1985
Party	Candidate	Votes	%	±%
Liberal	Angus Donaldson	2,454		
Labour	Ray Davies*	2,358		
Independent	C. Powell	1,817		
Labour	R. Woodyatt	1,516		
Plaid Cymru	J. Bradbury	485		
Turnout			73.7	
Liberal hold		Swing		
Labour hold		Swing		

=== Bedwellty No.1 Aberbargoed (one seat) ===
Bedwellty No.1 Aberbargoed 1985
Party	Candidate	Votes	%	±%
Plaid Cymru	K. Szerard	753	50.7	
Labour	M. Collis*	732	49.3	
Majority		21		
Turnout				
Plaid Cymru gain from Labour		Swing		

=== Bedwellty No.2 Abertysswg (one seat) ===
Bedwellty No.2 Abertysswg 1985
Party	Candidate	Votes	%	±%
Labour	S. Powell	Unopposed		
Labour hold		Swing		

=== Bridgend (two seats) ===
Bridgend 1985
Party	Candidate	Votes	%	±%
Labour	H. Davies	1,931		
Labour	R. Bowser*	1,773		
Conservative	W. Rutter	1,484		
Conservative	J. Spurgeon	1,385		
Alliance (SDP)	B. Ellis	1,110		
Alliance (SDP)	J. Dickens	961		
Plaid Cymru	M. Russell	353		
Turnout			39.3	
Labour gain from Conservative		Swing		
Labour hold		Swing		

=== Caerphilly No.1 (one seat) ===
Caerphilly No.1 1985
Party	Candidate	Votes	%	±%
Labour	L. Lewis*	Unopposed		
Labour hold		Swing		

=== Caerphilly No.2 Llanbradach (one seat) ===
Caerphilly No.2 Llanbradach 1985
Party	Candidate	Votes	%	±%
Plaid Cymru	Colin Mann*	1,092	49.3	
Labour	J. Lewis	798	36.1	
Liberal	K. Comeston	323	14.6	
Majority				
Turnout			46.6	
Plaid Cymru hold		Swing		

=== Caerphilly No.4 (one seat) ===
Caerphilly No.4 1985
Party	Candidate	Votes	%	±%
Labour	Bertie Rowland*	2,006	66.7	
Plaid Cymru	N. Owen	1,002	33.3	
Majority				
Turnout			39.7	
Labour hold		Swing		

=== Caerphilly No.5 North (one seat) ===
Caerphilly No.5 North 1985
Party	Candidate	Votes	%	±%
Plaid Cymru	John Gwynne	966	46.9	
Labour	R. Jewell*	808	39.3	
Liberal	T. Henderson	284	13.8	
Majority				
Turnout			49.5	+4.0
Plaid Cymru gain from Labour		Swing		

=== Caerphilly No.6 South (one seat) ===
Caerphilly No.6 South 1985
Party	Candidate	Votes	%	±%
Labour	G. Snell*	1,023	55.0	
Conservative	F. Howells	477	25.7	
Plaid Cymru	G. Hibbert	359	19.3	
Majority				
Turnout			42.1	
Labour hold		Swing		

=== Caerphilly No.7 (one seat) ===
Caerphilly No.7 1985
Party	Candidate	Votes	%	±%
Plaid Cymru	Penri Williams*	1,438	45.3	
Labour	M. Verrinder	1,014	31.9	
Conservative	A. Babbage	723	22.8	
Majority				
Turnout			52.8	
Plaid Cymru hold		Swing		

=== Cardiff Rural (one seat) ===
Cardiff Rural 1985
Party	Candidate	Votes	%	±%
Labour	C. Richards*	1,027	66.5	
Liberal	H. Morgan	607	33.5	
Majority				
Turnout			36.4	
Labour hold		Swing		

=== Cowbridge Rural (one seat) ===
Cowbridge Rural 1985
Party	Candidate	Votes	%	±%
Independent	J. David*	1,285	48.5	
Labour	G. Waters	1,387	67.7	
Plaid Cymru	Janet Davies	663	32.3	
Majority				
Turnout			41.0	
Labour gain from Independent		Swing		

=== Dowlais (one seat) ===
Dowlais 1985
Party	Candidate	Votes	%	±%
Labour	T. Lewis*	1,218	69.6	
Plaid Cymru	P. Jones	531	30.4	
Majority				
Turnout			39.3	
Labour hold		Swing		

=== Gelligaer No.1 (one seat) ===
Gelligaer No.1 1985
Party	Candidate	Votes	%	±%
Labour	N. Harris	1,735	66.8	
Plaid Cymru	G. Howells*	863	33.2	
Majority				
Turnout			48.9	
Labour gain from Plaid Cymru		Swing		

=== Gelligaer No.2 (one seat) ===
Gelligaer No.2 1985
Party	Candidate	Votes	%	±%
Labour	J. Davies*	684	48.6	
Independent	J. Bromley	619	44.0	
Plaid Cymru	G. Blenkin	103	7.3	
Majority				
Turnout			48.4	
Labour hold		Swing		

=== Gelligaer No.3 (one seat) ===
Gelligaer No.3 1985
Party	Candidate	Votes	%	±%
Labour	W. Coleman	1,842	58.1	
Plaid Cymru	J. Jones*	1,327	41.9	
Majority				
Turnout			45.1	
Labour gain from Plaid Cymru		Swing		

=== Gelligaer No.4 (two seats) ===
Gelligaer No.4 1985
Party	Candidate	Votes	%	±%
Labour	W. Bowen*	2,580		
Labour	B. Lloyd	2,485		
Conservative	J. Howard	662		
Turnout			59.2	
Labour hold		Swing		
Labour hold		Swing		

=== Llantrisant and Llantwitfardre No.1 (four seats) ===
Llantrisant and Llantwitfardre No.1 1985
Party	Candidate	Votes	%	±%
Labour	D. Bonner	4,105		
Labour	L. Lodwig*	4,090		
Labour	R. Selwood	3,747		
Labour	H. Prosser	3,735		
Ratepayers	T. John*	3,089		
Plaid Cymru	Delme Bowen	2,400		
Plaid Cymru	D. Watkins	1,730		
Plaid Cymru	J. Canning	1,609		
Plaid Cymru	G. Morris	1,566		
Conservative	R. Bunnage	1,552		
Conservative	J. Bunnage	1,534		
Conservative	L. Hunt	1,499		
Turnout			51.8	
Labour hold		Swing		
Labour hold		Swing		
Labour hold		Swing		
Labour gain from Ratepayers		Swing		

=== Llantrisant and Llantwitfardre No.2 (two seats) ===
Llantrisant and Llantwitfardre No.2 1985
Party	Candidate	Votes	%	±%
Labour	D. McDonald*	2,618		
Labour	W. Hall*	2,152		
Plaid Cymru	R. Williams	1,419		
Independent	B. Brinson	869		
RA	George Jury	698		
Independent Labour	A. Roberts	320		
Turnout			59.8	
Labour hold		Swing		
Labour hold		Swing		

=== Maesteg No.1 (one seat) ===
Maesteg No.1 1985
Party	Candidate	Votes	%	±%
Labour	V. Hart*	2,207		
Plaid Cymru	A. Rees	375		
Majority				
Turnout			42.1	
Labour hold		Swing		

=== Maesteg No.2 (one seat) ===
Maesteg No.2 1985
Party	Candidate	Votes	%	±%
Labour	Jeff Jones*	1,602		
Independent	M. Davies	367		
Majority				
Turnout			45.4	−13.9
Labour hold		Swing		

=== Maesteg No.3 (one seat) ===
Maesteg No.3 1985
Party	Candidate	Votes	%	±%
Labour	L. Jenkins*	1,915		
Plaid Cymru	J. Jenkins	315		
Conservative	S. Maddern	244		
Majority				
Turnout			49.1	+4.3
Labour hold		Swing		

=== Merthyr, Cyfarthfa (one seat) ===
Phillips had been elected as a Plaid Cymru candidate at both the 1977 and 1981 elections.

Merthyr, Cyfarthfa 1985
Party	Candidate	Votes	%	±%
Independent	M. Phillips*	1,552	58.6	
Labour	P. Rees	951	35.9	
Plaid Cymru	T. Barry	145	5.5	
Majority				
Turnout				
Independent gain from Plaid Cymru		Swing		

=== Merthyr No.6 (one seat) ===
Merthyr No.6 1985
Party	Candidate	Votes	%	±%
Labour	H. Jones*	Unopposed		
Labour hold		Swing		

=== Merthyr No.7 (one seat) ===
Merthyr No.7 1985
Party	Candidate	Votes	%	±%
Labour	T. O'Brien	Unopposed		
Labour hold		Swing		

=== Merthyr Park (two seats) ===
Merthyr Park 1985
Party	Candidate	Votes	%	±%
Labour	J. Burns*	1,764		
Labour	J. Cleary*	1,707		
Communist	A. Jones	696		
Conservative	H. Screen	496		
Turnout				
Labour hold		Swing		
Labour hold		Swing		

=== Merthyr Town (one seat) ===
Merthyr Town 1985
Party	Candidate	Votes	%	±%
Labour	G. Davies	1,234		
Conservative	E. Horne	271		
Communist	T. Roberts	173		
Majority				
Turnout				
Labour hold		Swing		

=== Mountain Ash No.1 (one seat) ===
Mountain Ash No.1 1985
Party	Candidate	Votes	%	±%
Labour	T. Davies*	1,806		
Plaid Cymru	B. Evans	1,580		
Conservative	J. Evans	174		
Majority				
Turnout				
Labour hold		Swing		

=== Mountain Ash No.2 (one seat) ===
Mountain Ash No.2 1973
Party	Candidate	Votes	%	±%
Labour	D. Edwards	1,156		
Plaid Cymru	A. Thomas	721		
Majority				
Turnout				
Labour hold		Swing		

=== Mountain Ash No.3 (two seats) ===
Mountain Ash No.3 1985
Party	Candidate	Votes	%	±%
Plaid Cymru	Pauline Jarman*	1,952		
Labour	H. Evans	1,779		
Labour	E. George	1,610		
Conservative	D. Ball	447		
Turnout				
Plaid Cymru hold		Swing		
Labour hold		Swing		

=== Ogmore and Garw No.1 (one seat) ===
Ogmore and Garw No.1 1985
Party	Candidate	Votes	%	±%
Labour	M. Hughes	1,692		
Ratepayers	Danny Mordecai*	615		
Majority				
Turnout				
Labour gain from Ratepayers		Swing		

=== Ogmore and Garw No.2 (two seats) ===
Ogmore and Garw No.2 1985
Party	Candidate	Votes	%	±%
Labour	A. Lock*	2,474		
Labour	L. Morgan	2,317		
Plaid Cymru	E. Merriman*	2,054		
Plaid Cymru	J. Jones	1,950		
Turnout				
Labour hold		Swing		
Labour gain from Plaid Cymru		Swing		

=== Penybont No.1 (one seat) ===
Penybont No.1 1985
Party	Candidate	Votes	%	±%
Labour	R. Jenkins*	1,005	38.5	
Independent	F. Beer	672	25.6	
Conservative	G. Griffiths	611	23.4	
Independent Ratepayer	E. Phillips	319	12.2	
Majority				
Turnout				
Labour gain from Conservative		Swing		

=== Penybont No.2 (one seat) ===
Penybont No.2 1985
Party	Candidate	Votes	%	±%
Independent	D. Thomas*	1,045		
Conservative	R. Preston	898		
Turnout			42.1	
Independent hold		Swing		

=== Penybont No.3 (one seat) ===
Penybont No.3
Party	Candidate	Votes	%	±%
Labour	W. Philpin*	1,821	70.7	
Conservative	D. Mackie	753	29.3	
Majority				
Turnout			38.2	
Labour hold		Swing		

=== Penybont No.4 (one seat) ===
Penybont No.4 1985
Party	Candidate	Votes	%	±%
Labour	M. Ing	1,465	48.0	
Conservative	David Unwin*	1,319	43.2	
Plaid Cymru	R. Fattorini	269	8.8	
Majority				
Turnout			37.1	
Labour gain from Conservative		Swing		

=== Penybont No.5 (two seats) ===
Penybont No.5 1985
Party	Candidate	Votes	%	±%
Labour	E. Davies*	3,374		
Labour	M. Jones*	3,159		
Independent	D. Davis	1,659		
Plaid Cymru	K. Burnell	620		
Conservative	M. Powell	528		
Plaid Cymru	P. Tomlin	403		
Turnout			54.9	
Labour hold		Swing		
Labour hold		Swing		

=== Penybont No.6 (two seats) ===
Penybont No.6 1985
Party	Candidate	Votes	%	±%
Labour	Philip Squire*	2,024		
Labour	S. Gronow	1,991		
Plaid Cymru	B. Williams	927		
Conservative	J. Padmore	754		
Turnout			46.4	
Labour hold		Swing		
Labour hold		Swing		

=== Penydarren (one seat) ===
Penydarren 1985
Party	Candidate	Votes	%	±%
Labour	T. Mahoney*	Unopposed		
Labour hold		Swing		

=== Pontypridd No.1 (one seat) ===
Pontypridd No.1 1985
Party	Candidate	Votes	%	±%
Labour	W. Williams*	1,208	73.4	
Plaid Cymru	J. Green	437	26.6	
Turnout			43.2	
Labour hold		Swing		

=== Pontypridd No.2 Town (one seat) ===
Pontypridd No.2 Town 1985
Party	Candidate	Votes	%	±%
Plaid Cymru	Clayton Jones	1,261	57.6	
Labour	B. Burford	930	42.4	
Majority				
Turnout			52.7	
Plaid Cymru hold		Swing		

=== Pontypridd No.3 (one seat) ===
Pontypridd No.3 1985
Party	Candidate	Votes	%	±%
Labour	A. Davies	538	60.0	
Independent	Steve Belzak	359	40.0	
Majority				
Turnout			44.9	
Labour hold		Swing		

=== Pontypridd No.4 Trallwn (one seat) ===
Pontypridd No.4 Trallwn 1985
Party	Candidate	Votes	%	±%
Liberal	H. Thomas	649	50.3	
Labour	D. Boyce	403	39.0	
Conservative	M. Williams	137	10.6	
Majority				
Turnout			43.5	
Liberal hold		Swing		

=== Pontypridd No.5 Rhydyfelin (one seat) ===
Pontypridd No.5 Rhydyfelin 1985
Party	Candidate	Votes	%	±%
Labour	J. Davies*	1,456	69.1	
Independent	M. Powell	389	18.5	
Plaid Cymru	R. Thomas	262	12.4	
Turnout			32.0	
Labour hold		Swing		

=== Pontypridd No.6 (one seat) ===
Pontypridd No.6 1985
Party	Candidate	Votes	%	±%
Labour	H. Weston*	1,108	57.9	
Independent	G. Orsie	536	28.0	
Plaid Cymru	G. Davies	270	14.1	
Majority				
Turnout			41.3	
Labour hold		Swing		

=== Porthcawl No.1 (one seat) ===
Porthcawl No.1 1985
Party	Candidate	Votes	%	±%
Conservative	Peter Hubbard-Miles*	1,388	41.3	
Labour	C. Hall	1,138	33.9	
Alliance (SDP)	M. Skinner	835	24.8	
Majority				
Turnout			45.1	
Conservative hold		Swing		

=== Porthcawl No.2 (one seat) ===
Porthcawl No.2 1985
Party	Candidate	Votes	%	±%
Labour	G. McBride*	1,397	56.6	
Conservative	D. Anderson	1,073	43.4	
Majority				
Turnout			46.3	
Labour hold		Swing		

=== Rhondda No.1 Treherbert (two seats) ===
Rhondda No.1 Treherbert 1985
Party	Candidate	Votes	%	±%
Labour	D. Williams*	1,773		
Communist	Arthur True*	1,643		
Labour	I. Lisle	1,263		
Plaid Cymru	D. Rees	1,212		
Plaid Cymru	S. Macmillan	841		
Turnout			80.5	
Labour hold		Swing		
Communist hold		Swing		

=== Rhondda No.2 Treorchy (two seats) ===
Rhondda No.2 Treorchy 1985
Party	Candidate	Votes	%	±%
Labour	G. Rees*	1,850		
Labour	K. Winter	1,767		
Plaid Cymru	H. Davies	1,219		
Turnout			49.9	
Labour hold		Swing		
Labour hold		Swing		

=== Rhondda No.3 Pentre (one seat) ===
Rhondda No.3 Pentre 1985
Party	Candidate	Votes	%	±%
Labour	W. Gough	1,176	64.2	
Plaid Cymru	M. Powell	657	35.8	
Majority				
Turnout			43.1	
Labour hold		Swing		

=== Rhondda No.4 Ystrad (one seat) ===
Rhondda No.4 Ystrad 1985
Party	Candidate	Votes	%	±%
Independent	T. Hughes	1,260	53.1	
Labour	K. Morgan	1,112	46.9	
Majority				
Turnout			45.4	
Independent hold		Swing		

=== Rhondda No.5 (one seat) ===
Rhondda No.5 1985
Party	Candidate	Votes	%	±%
Labour	E. Emmanuel	Unopposed		
Labour hold		Swing		

=== Rhondda No.6 (one seat) ===
Rhondda No.6 1985
Party	Candidate	Votes	%	±%
Labour	E. Harris	1,796	75.6	
Alliance (SDP)	P. Nicholas	579	24.4	
Majority				
Turnout			42.0	
Labour hold		Swing		

=== Rhondda No.7 Penygraig (one seat) ===
Rhondda No.7 Penygraig 1985
Party	Candidate	Votes	%	±%
Labour	C. Richards*	1,102	60.3	
Plaid Cymru	E. Edwards	417	22.8	
Communist	H. Martin	309	16.9	
Majority				
Turnout			42.9	
Labour hold		Swing		

=== Rhondda No.8 Porth (two seats) ===
Rhondda No.8 Porth 1985
Party	Candidate	Votes	%	±%
Labour	A. Ellis*	1,935		
Labour	L. Rees*	1,777		
Ratepayers	D. Henshaw	1,539		
Ratepayers	D. Rowe	1,330		
Turnout			42.9	
Labour hold		Swing		
Labour hold		Swing		

=== Rhondda No.9 (one seat) ===
Rhondda No.9 1985
Party	Candidate	Votes	%	±%
Labour	H. Stonelake	Unopposed		
Labour hold		Swing		

=== Rhondda No.10, Tylorstown (one seat) ===
Rhondda No.10, Tylorstown 1985
Party	Candidate	Votes	%	±%
Ratepayers	M.E. Chard	1,354	60.3	
Labour	M. Mitchell	891	39.7	
Majority				
Turnout			42.0	
Ratepayers hold		Swing		

=== Rhondda No.11 Ferndale (two seats) ===
Rhondda No.11 Ferndale 1985
Party	Candidate	Votes	%	±%
Plaid Cymru	Glyn James*	2,305		
Labour	P. Davies*	1,769		
Labour	I. Clement	1,753		
Turnout			56.5	
Plaid Cymru hold		Swing		
Labour hold		Swing		

=== Rhymney Lower, Middle and Upper (one seat) ===
Rhymney Lower, Middle and Upper 1985
Party	Candidate	Votes	%	±%
Labour	E. Rist	Unopposed		
Labour hold		Swing		

=== Treharris (one seat) ===
Treharris 1985
Party	Candidate	Votes	%	±%
Labour	T. Richards*	1,073	53.8	
Independent	E. Galsowrthy	763	38.2	
Conservative	F. Evans	159	8.0	
Majority				
Turnout			38.9	
Labour hold		Swing		

=== Vaynor and Penderyn No.1 (one seat) ===
Vaynor and Penderyn No.1 1985
Party	Candidate	Votes	%	±%
Labour	G. Thomas	1,215	85.7	
Conservative	D. Younie	202	14.3	
Majority				
Turnout			46.6	
Labour gain from Plaid Cymru		Swing		

=== Vaynor and Penderyn No.2 (one seat) ===
Vaynor and Penderyn No.2 1985
Party	Candidate	Votes	%	±%
Labour	M. Chambers*	Unopposed		
Labour hold		Swing		
