= 1981 Mid Glamorgan County Council election =

1981 Welsh local government election

The 1981 Mid Glamorgan County Council election was held in May 1981 and were the third elections to Mid Glamorgan County Council, electing 85 councillors. They were preceded by the 1977 elections and followed by the 1985 elections.

== Ward results ==
=== Aberdare No.1: Llwydcoed (two seats) ===
Labour comfortably held both seats. Plaid Cymru, who held a seat in the ward from 1973 to 1977, did not field a candidate.

Aberdare No.1: Llwydcoed 1981
Party	Candidate	Votes	%	±%
Labour	J. Powell*	2,104		
Labour	Mervyn Prowle*	1,956		
Liberal	D. Higgins	1,078		
Turnout			48.2	−11.3
Labour hold		Swing		
Labour hold		Swing		

=== Aberdare No.2: Blaengwawr (one seat) ===
Aberdare No.2: Blaengwawr 1981
Party	Candidate	Votes	%	±%
Plaid Cymru	Glyn Owen*	1,728	52.4	−7.4
Labour	B. Fitzgerald	1,571	47.6	+7.4
Majority			4.8	− 14.8
Turnout			53.7	−11.7
Plaid Cymru hold		Swing		

=== Aberdare No.3: Gadlys (one seat) ===
Aberdare No.3: Gadlys 1981
Party	Candidate	Votes	%	±%
Labour	V. Llywellyn*	852	58.5	+1.7
Independent	L. Rosser	605	41.5	
Majority			17.0	+3.5
Turnout			59.4	−20.8
Labour hold		Swing		

=== Aberdare No.4: Town (one seat) ===
Aberdare No.4: Town 1981
Party	Candidate	Votes	%	±%
Independent	P. Williams	743	44.6	−13.9
Labour	W. Price	694	41.7	+0.2
Plaid Cymru	M. Thomas	229	13.7	
Majority			2.9	−14.0
Turnout			48.5	+1.5
Independent hold		Swing		

=== Aberdare No.5: Aberaman (one seat) ===
Aberdare No.5: Aberaman 1981
Party	Candidate	Votes	%	±%
Labour	R. Reed	Unopposed		
Labour hold		Swing		

=== Abertridwr and Senghennydd ===
Abertridwr and Senghennydd 1981
Party	Candidate	Votes	%	±%
Ratepayers	J. Davies	1,484	64.5	−11.1
Labour	E. Wright	817	35.5	+11.1
Majority			29.0	−20.1
Turnout			43.6	+1.1
Ratepayers hold		Swing		

=== Bedwas and Machen (two seats) ===
Bedwas and Machen 1981
Party	Candidate	Votes	%	±%
Labour	Ray Davies*	2,897		
Liberal	Angus Donaldson	2,799		
Labour	E. Gwynne	2,279		
Turnout			58.5	
Labour hold		Swing		
Liberal gain from Labour		Swing		

=== Bedwellty No.1 Aberbargoed (one seat) ===
Bedwellty No.1 Aberbargoed 1981
Party	Candidate	Votes	%	±%
Labour	M. Collis	838	55.5	+9.1
Plaid Cymru	K. Szerard*	673	44.5	−9.1
Majority				
Turnout			51.7	−5.90
Labour gain from Plaid Cymru		Swing		

=== Bedwellty No.2 Abertysswg (one seat) ===
Bedwellty No.2 Abertysswg 1981
Party	Candidate	Votes	%	±%
Labour	R. Powell	1,457	76.8	+34.4
Plaid Cymru	Bill Hyde	440	23.2	−34.4
Majority			53.6	
Turnout			44.4	−13.6
Labour gain from Plaid Cymru		Swing		

=== Bridgend (two seats) ===
Bridgend 1981
Party	Candidate	Votes	%	±%
Conservative	F. Bertorelli	1,648		
Labour	R. Bowser	1,548		
Labour	H. Davies	1,547		
Conservative	W. Rutter*	1,512		
Ratepayers	P. Roberts	1,372		
Ratepayers	B. Ellis	1,220		
Independent	R. Evans	703		
Turnout			44.0	−9.8
Conservative hold		Swing		
Labour gain from Conservative		Swing		

=== Caerphilly No.1 (one seat) ===
Caerphilly No.1 1981
Party	Candidate	Votes	%	±%
Labour	L. Lewis*	985	59.5	+8.5
Plaid Cymru	A. Morgan	361	21.8	−14.6
Liberal	N. Lewis	309	18.7	+18.7
Majority				
Turnout			52.8	−12.0
Labour hold		Swing		

=== Caerphilly No.2 Llanbradach (one seat) ===
Caerphilly No.2 Llanbradach 1981
Party	Candidate	Votes	%	±%
Plaid Cymru	Colin Mann*	1,643	65.2	+14.1
Labour	E. Piper	878	34.83	+1.5
Majority				
Turnout			52.8	
Plaid Cymru hold		Swing		

=== Caerphilly No.4 (one seat) ===
Bertie Rowland, a long-serving Labour councilor on the former Glamorgan County Council, regained the seat that he narrowly lost four years previously.

Caerphilly No.4 1981
Party	Candidate	Votes	%	±%
Labour	Bertie Rowland	1,734	46.7	+6.5
Plaid Cymru	Lindsay Whittle*	1,212	32.6	−5.6
Liberal	A. Lambert	477	12.8	+12.8
Conservative	R. Bisley	291	7.8	
Majority				
Turnout			51.0	
Labour gain from Plaid Cymru		Swing		

=== Caerphilly No.5 North (one seat) ===
Caerphilly No.5 North 1981
Party	Candidate	Votes	%	±%
Labour	R. Jewell*	1,035	56.1	
Plaid Cymru	Phil Bevan	810	43.9	
Majority				
Turnout			45.5	−1.0
Labour hold		Swing		

=== Caerphilly No.6 South (one seat) ===
Caerphilly No.6 South 1981
Party	Candidate	Votes	%	±%
Labour	G. Snell	798	37.5	
Independent	M. Ryland	706	33.1	
Plaid Cymru	G. Hibbert	234	11.0	
Ratepayers	P. Lewis	224	10.5	
Liberal	L. Price	168	7.9	
Majority				
Turnout			48.3	
Labour gain from Independent		Swing		

=== Caerphilly No.7 (one seat) ===
Caerphilly No.7 1981
Party	Candidate	Votes	%	±%
Plaid Cymru	Penri Williams	1,814	63.0	
Labour	R. Toghill	1,067	37.0	
Majority				
Turnout			47.8	
Plaid Cymru hold		Swing		

=== Cardiff Rural (one seat) ===
Cardiff Rural 1981
Party	Candidate	Votes	%	±%
Labour	C. Richards*	1,233	60.7	
Ratepayers	A. Goodchild	798	39.3	
Majority				
Turnout			41.8	
Labour hold		Swing		

=== Cowbridge Rural (one seat) ===
Cowbridge Rural 1981
Party	Candidate	Votes	%	±%
Independent	J. David*	1,285	48.5	
Labour	I. Williams	873	32.9	
Plaid Cymru	Janet Davies	493	18.6	
Majority				
Turnout			41.0	
Independent hold		Swing		

=== Dowlais (one seat) ===
Dowlais 1981
Party	Candidate	Votes	%	±%
Labour	T. Lewis*	1,218	69.6	
Plaid Cymru	P. Jones	531	30.4	
Majority				
Turnout			39.3	
Labour hold		Swing		

=== Gelligaer No.1 (one seat) ===
Gelligaer No.1 1981
Party	Candidate	Votes	%	±%
Labour	N. Harris	1,735	66.8	
Plaid Cymru	G. Howells*	863	33.2	
Majority				
Turnout			48.9	
Labour gain from Plaid Cymru		Swing		

=== Gelligaer No.2 (one seat) ===
Gelligaer No.2 1981
Party	Candidate	Votes	%	±%
Labour	J. Davies*	684	48.6	
Independent	J. Bromley	619	44.0	
Plaid Cymru	G. Blenkin	103	7.3	
Majority				
Turnout			48.4	
Labour hold		Swing		

=== Gelligaer No.3 (one seat) ===
Gelligaer No.3 1981
Party	Candidate	Votes	%	±%
Labour	W. Coleman	1,842	58.1	
Plaid Cymru	J. Jones*	1,327	41.9	
Majority				
Turnout			45.1	
Labour gain from Plaid Cymru		Swing		

=== Gelligaer No.4 (two seats) ===
Gelligaer No.4 1981
Party	Candidate	Votes	%	±%
Labour	W. Bowen*	2,580		
Labour	B. Lloyd	2,485		
Conservative	J. Howard	662		
Turnout			59.2	
Labour hold		Swing		
Labour hold		Swing		

=== Llantrisant and Llantwitfardre No.1 (four seats) ===
Llantrisant and Llantwitfardre No.1 1981
Party	Candidate	Votes	%	±%
Labour	D. Bonner	4,105		
Labour	L. Lodwig*	4,090		
Labour	R. Selwood	3,747		
Labour	H. Prosser	3,735		
Ratepayers	T. John*	3,089		
Plaid Cymru	Delme Bowen	2,400		
Plaid Cymru	D. Watkins	1,730		
Plaid Cymru	J. Canning	1,609		
Plaid Cymru	G. Morris	1,566		
Conservative	R. Bunnage	1,552		
Conservative	J. Bunnage	1,534		
Conservative	L. Hunt	1,499		
Turnout			51.8	
Labour hold		Swing		
Labour hold		Swing		
Labour hold		Swing		
Labour gain from Ratepayers		Swing		

=== Llantrisant and Llantwit Fardre No.2 (two seats) ===
Llantrisant and Llantwitfardre No.2 1981
Party	Candidate	Votes	%	±%
Labour	D. McDonald	2,776		
Labour	W. Hall	2,163		
RA	George Jury	1,101		
Independent	R. Brinson	1,060		
RA	H. Deardon	775		
Plaid Cymru	R. Williams	741		
Turnout			55.4	
Labour hold		Swing		
Labour hold		Swing		

=== Maesteg No.1 (one seat) ===
Maesteg No.1 1981
Party	Candidate	Votes	%	±%
Labour	V. Hart	Unopposed		
Labour hold		Swing		

=== Maesteg No.2 (one seat) ===
Maesteg No.2 1981
Party	Candidate	Votes	%	±%
Labour	Jeff Jones	1,364		
Liberal	Jennie Gibbs*	1,171		
Majority				
Turnout			59.3	+5.0
Labour gain from Liberal		Swing		

=== Maesteg No.3 (one seat) ===
Maesteg No.3 1981
Party	Candidate	Votes	%	±%
Labour	L. Jenkins	1,676		
Plaid Cymru	I. Williams	368		
Conservative	K. Rowe	198		
Majority				
Turnout			44.8	−5.0
Labour hold		Swing		

=== Merthyr, Cyfarthfa (one seat) ===
Merthyr, Cyfarthfa 1981
Party	Candidate	Votes	%	±%
Plaid Cymru	M. Phillips*	1,480	57.6	
Labour	K. Thomas	1,091	42.4	
Majority				
Turnout				
Plaid Cymru hold		Swing		

=== Merthyr No.6 (one seat) ===
Merthyr No.6 1981
Party	Candidate	Votes	%	±%
Labour	H. Jones	1,632		
Plaid Cymru	C. Foley	937		
Majority				
Turnout			61.5	−7.6
Labour hold		Swing		

=== Merthyr No.7 (one seat) ===
Merthyr No.7 1981
Party	Candidate	Votes	%	±%
Labour	T. O'Brien*	1,154		
Plaid Cymru	E. Bartlett	1.045		
Majority				
Turnout				
Labour hold		Swing		

=== Merthyr Park (two seats) ===
Merthyr Park 1981
Party	Candidate	Votes	%	±%
Labour	J. Burns*	1,810		
Labour	J. Cleary	1,615		
Plaid Cymru	G. Foster*	1,265		
Plaid Cymru	D. Thomas	822		
Communist	A. Jones	627		
Liberal	G. Cooper	495		
Communist	C. Dennett	155		
Workers Revolutionary	R. Gould	109		
Turnout			45.9	
Labour hold		Swing		
Labour gain from Plaid Cymru		Swing		

=== Merthyr Town (one seat) ===
Merthyr Town 1981
Party	Candidate	Votes	%	±%
Labour	T. Davies*	1,056		
Independent	R. Howells	840		
Conservative	E. Horne	252		
Communist	T. Roberts	131		
Majority				
Turnout				
Labour hold		Swing		

=== Mountain Ash No.1 (one seat) ===
Mountain Ash No.1 1981
Party	Candidate	Votes	%	±%
Labour	T. Davies*	1,723		
Plaid Cymru	G. Jones	1,137		
Majority				
Turnout				
Labour hold		Swing		

=== Mountain Ash No.2 (one seat) ===
Mountain Ash No.2 1981
Party	Candidate	Votes	%	±%
Labour	F. Edwards	1,215		
Plaid Cymru	N. Thomas*	953		
Majority				
Turnout				
Labour gain from Plaid Cymru		Swing		

=== Mountain Ash No.3 (two seats) ===
Mountain Ash No.3 1981
Party	Candidate	Votes	%	±%
Labour	H. Evans	1,870		
Plaid Cymru	Pauline Jarman	1,801		
Labour	S. Lloyd*	1,717		
Turnout				
Labour hold		Swing		
Plaid Cymru hold		Swing		

=== Ogmore and Garw No.1 (one seat) ===
Ogmore and Garw No.1 1981
Party	Candidate	Votes	%	±%
Ratepayers	Danny Mordecai	1,144		
Labour	G. Mackay	633		
Independent	R. Smiles	402		
Majority				
Turnout				
Ratepayers hold		Swing		

=== Ogmore and Garw No.2 (two seats) ===
Ogmore and Garw No.2 1981
Party	Candidate	Votes	%	±%
Plaid Cymru	E. Merriman*	2,670		
Labour	A. Lock	2,474		
Labour	D. Hughes	2,364		
Plaid Cymru	J. Jones	1,855		
Conservative	S. Thomas	261		
Conservative	R. Cave	190		
Turnout				
Plaid Cymru hold		Swing		
Labour hold		Swing		

=== Penybont No.1 (one seat) ===
Penybont No.1 1981
Party	Candidate	Votes	%	±%
Labour	R. Jenkins	1,005	38.5	
Independent	F. Beer	672	25.6	
Conservative	G. Griffiths	611	23.4	
Independent Ratepayer	E. Phillips	319	12.2	
Majority				
Turnout				
Labour gain from Conservative		Swing		

=== Penybont No.2 (one seat) ===
Walters had previously represented the neighbouring Penybont No.1 Ward which was also lost by the Conservatives.

Penybont No.2 1981
Party	Candidate	Votes	%	±%
Independent	D. Thomas	1,112		
Conservative	L. Walters*	873		
Turnout			44.4	
Independent gain from Conservative		Swing		

=== Penybont No.3 (one seat) ===
Penybont No.3
Party	Candidate	Votes	%	±%
Labour	W. Philpin	1,775	57.7	
Conservative	J. Spurgeon*	826	26.8	
Independent	J. Ogden	304	9.9	
Plaid Cymru	B. Williams	173	5.6	
Majority				
Turnout			47.3	
Labour gain from Conservative		Swing		

=== Penybont No.4 (one seat) ===
Penybont No.4 1981
Party	Candidate	Votes	%	±%
Conservative	David Unwin	1,407	51.3	
Labour	G. Stevens	1,044	38.1	
Plaid Cymru	R. Fattorini	291	10.6	
Majority				
Turnout			42.6	
Conservative hold		Swing		

=== Penybont No.5 (two seats) ===
Penybont No.5 1981
Party	Candidate	Votes	%	±%
Labour	E. Davies*	3,579		
Labour	M. Jones*	3,463		
Conservative	M. Eade	725		
Plaid Cymru	K. Burnell	677		
Conservative	W. Jones	672		
Plaid Cymru	P. Tomlin	623		
Turnout			44.4	
Labour hold		Swing		
Labour hold		Swing		

=== Penybont No.6 (two seats) ===
Penybont No.6 1981
Party	Candidate	Votes	%	±%
Labour	Philip Squire*	2,334		
Labour	G. Walters	2,229		
Plaid Cymru	D. Jones	492		
Independent	D. Thomas	479		
Conservative	M. Powell	476		
Plaid Cymru	A. Rees	458		
Conservative	Chris Smart	355		
Turnout			47.6	
Labour hold		Swing		
Labour gain from Independent		Swing		

=== Penydarren (one seat) ===
Penydarren 1981
Party	Candidate	Votes	%	±%
Labour	T. Mahoney*	Unopposed		
Labour hold		Swing		

=== Pontypridd No.1 (one seat) ===
Pontypridd No.1 1981
Party	Candidate	Votes	%	±%
Labour	W. Williams*	1,129	55.4	
Plaid Cymru	S. Holcombe	503	24.7	
Independent	K. James	405	19.9	
Turnout			52.1	
Labour hold		Swing		

=== Pontypridd No.2 Town (one seat) ===
Pontypridd No.2 Town 1981
Party	Candidate	Votes	%	±%
Plaid Cymru	Clayton Jones	986	39.5	
Labour	W. Jones*	950	38.1	
Liberal	B. Murphy	560	22.4	
Majority				
Turnout			57.1	
Plaid Cymru gain from Labour		Swing		

=== Pontypridd No.3 (one seat) ===
Pontypridd No.3 1977
Party	Candidate	Votes	%	±%
Labour	A. Davies	723	68.4	
Plaid Cymru	G. Watkins	229	21.7	
Conservative	Steve Belzak	105	9.9	
Majority				
Turnout			48.9	
Labour hold		Swing		

=== Pontypridd No.4 Trallwn (one seat) ===
Pontypridd No.4 Trallwn 1981
Party	Candidate	Votes	%	±%
Liberal	Meriel Murphy*	1,001	65.2	
Labour	P. Hill	369	24.0	
Plaid Cymru	G. Gregory	166	10.8	
Majority				
Turnout			48.6	
Liberal hold		Swing		

=== Pontypridd No.5 Rhydyfelin (one seat) ===
Pontypridd No.5 Rhydyfelin 1981
Party	Candidate	Votes	%	±%
Labour	J. Davies*	1,495	70.4	
Plaid Cymru	Joseph Biddulph	368	17.3	
Conservative	B. Morgan-Lewis	261	12.3	
Turnout			30.7	
Labour hold		Swing		

=== Pontypridd No.6 (one seat) ===
Pontypridd No.6 1981
Party	Candidate	Votes	%	±%
Labour	H. Weston*	1,255	64.7	
Plaid Cymru	E. Watkins	516	26.6	
Conservative	L. Jarman	168	8.7	
Majority				
Turnout			37.2	
Labour hold		Swing		

=== Porthcawl No.1 (one seat) ===
Porthcawl No.1 1981
Party	Candidate	Votes	%	±%
Conservative	Peter Hubbard-Miles*	1,927	60.5	
Labour	A. Thomas	1,260	39.5	
Majority				
Turnout			44.4	
Conservative hold		Swing		

=== Porthcawl No.2 (one seat) ===
Porthcawl No.2 1981
Party	Candidate	Votes	%	±%
Labour	G. McBride	1,279	53.6	
Conservative	G. Fairley	1,109	46.4	
Majority				
Turnout			45.8	
Labour gain from Conservative		Swing		

=== Rhondda No.1 Treherbert (two seats) ===
Rhondda No.1 Treherbert 1981
Party	Candidate	Votes	%	±%
Labour	G. Williams*	1,980		
Communist	Arthur True*	1,818		
Labour	I. Lisle	1,395		
Plaid Cymru	Geraint Davies	1,254		
Plaid Cymru	S. Macmillan	553		
Turnout			85.7	
Labour hold		Swing		
Communist hold		Swing		

=== Rhondda No.2 Treorchy (two seats) ===
Rhondda No.2 Treorchy 1981
Party	Candidate	Votes	%	±%
Labour	H. Jones*	Unopposed		
Labour	G. Rees*	Unopposed		
Labour hold		Swing		
Labour hold		Swing		

=== Rhondda No.3 Pentre (one seat) ===
Rhondda No.3 Pentre 1981
Party	Candidate	Votes	%	±%
Labour	W. Gough	1,240	63.3	
Plaid Cymru	M. Powell	720	36.7	
Majority				
Turnout			44.4	
Labour hold		Swing		

=== Rhondda No.4 Ystrad (one seat) ===
Rhondda No.4 Ystrad 1981
Party	Candidate	Votes	%	±%
Independent	T. Hughes	1,718	61.2	
Labour	D. Thomas*	1,091	38.8	
Majority				
Turnout			55.3	
Independent gain from Labour		Swing		

=== Rhondda No.5 (one seat) ===
Rhondda No.5 1981
Party	Candidate	Votes	%	±%
Labour	E. Emmanuel	1,899	63.6	
Plaid Cymru	D. Morgan*	1,085	36.4	
Majority				
Turnout			56.2	
Labour gain from Plaid Cymru		Swing		

=== Rhondda No.6 (one seat) ===
Rhondda No.6 1977
Party	Candidate	Votes	%	±%
Labour	E. Harris	1,941	68.2	
Conservative	P. Leyshon	648	22.8	
Plaid Cymru	C. Pugh	255	9.0	
Majority				
Turnout			50.2	
Labour hold		Swing		

=== Rhondda No.7 Penygraig (one seat) ===
Rhondda No.7 Penygraig 1981
Party	Candidate	Votes	%	±%
Labour	C. Richards*	Unopposed		
Labour hold		Swing		

=== Rhondda No.8 Porth (two seats) ===
Rhondda No.8 Porth 1981
Party	Candidate	Votes	%	±%
Labour	A. Ellis*	2,123		
Labour	L. Rees	2,046		
Ratepayers	T. Rees	1,494		
Ratepayers	R. Dentus	1,469		
Turnout			45.4	
Labour hold		Swing		
Labour hold		Swing		

=== Rhondda No.9 (one seat) ===
Rhondda No.9 1981
Party	Candidate	Votes	%	±%
Labour	A. Williams	1,475	56.1	
Ratepayers	D. May*	1,155	43.9	
Majority				
Turnout			56.5	
Labour gain from Ratepayers		Swing		

=== Rhymney Lower, Middle and Upper (one seat) ===
Rhymney Lower, Middle and Upper 1981
Party	Candidate	Votes	%	±%
Labour	J. Williams*	1,679	90.8	
Plaid Cymru	A. Cosh	170	9.2	
Majority				
Turnout			41.4	
Labour hold		Swing		

=== Treharris (one seat) ===
Treharris 1981
Party	Candidate	Votes	%	±%
Labour	T. Richards*	Unopposed		
Labour hold		Swing		

=== Vaynor and Penderyn No.1 (one seat) ===
Vaynor and Penderyn No.1 1981
Party	Candidate	Votes	%	±%
Plaid Cymru	C. Harris	972	53.8	
Labour	I. Holt	834	46.2	
Majority				
Turnout			53.9	
Plaid Cymru hold		Swing		

=== Vaynor and Penderyn No.2 (one seat) ===
Vaynor and Penderyn No.2 1981
Party	Candidate	Votes	%	±%
Labour	M. Chambers	804	55.8	
Independent	T. Smith	636	44.2	
Majority				
Turnout			55.3	
Labour hold		Swing		
