= 1989 Mid Glamorgan County Council election =

1989 Welsh local government election

The 1989 Mid Glamorgan County Council election was held in May 1989 and was the fifth full election to Mid Glamorgan County Council. It was preceded by the 1985 election and followed by the 1993 election.

There were extensive boundary changes at this election, following The County of Mid Glamorgan (Electoral Arrangements) Order 1988. The number of wards were increased to 74, each electing one councillor.

== Overview ==
The Labour Party retained overall control winning 65 of the 74 seats.

* existing councillor, for the same ward
^{o} existing councillor, though because of boundary changes not for the same ward

== Ward results ==
=== Aberaman North ===
Aberaman North 1989
Party	Candidate	Votes	%	±%
Labour	B. Fitzgerald°	1,369	85.5	
Democrat	K. Gray	233	14.5	
Majority			70.9	
Turnout			39.7	
Labour win (new seat)				

=== Aberaman South ===
Aberaman South 1989
Party	Candidate	Votes	%	±%
Labour	R. Reed°	841	54.8	
Plaid Cymru	P. Richards	635	41.4	
Democrat	Ms M. Gee	58	3.8	
Majority			13.4	
Turnout			40.5	
Labour win (new seat)				

=== Abercynon ===
Abercynon 1989
Party	Candidate	Votes	%	±%
Labour	T. Davies°	855	59.8	
Plaid Cymru	D. Morgan	574	40.2	
Majority			19.7	
Turnout			28.8	
Labour win (new seat)				

=== Aberdare East ===
Aberdare East 1989
Party	Candidate	Votes	%	±%
Labour	V. Llywellyn°	1,145	75.5	
Democrat	D. Gee	372	24.5	
Majority			51.0	
Turnout			28.8	
Labour win (new seat)				

=== Aberdare West ===
Aberdare West 1989
Party	Candidate	Votes	%	±%
Labour	Mervyn Prowle°	1,143	55.0	
Plaid Cymru	W. Daniel	643	30.9	
Conservative	E. Evans	293	14.1	
Majority			24.1	
Turnout			31.6	
Labour win (new seat)				

=== Aber Valley ===
Aber Valley 1989
Party	Candidate	Votes	%	±%
Labour	R. Phillips°	1,065	49.8	
Ratepayers	J. Davies	574	26.8	
Plaid Cymru	Ms E. Prendergast	500	23.4	
Majority			23.0	
Turnout			44.7	
Labour win (new seat)				

=== Bargoed ===
Bargoed 1989
Party	Candidate	Votes	%	±%
Labour	W. Coleman°	1,901	75.3	
Plaid Cymru	W. Hyde	622	24.7	
Majority			50.7	
Turnout			36.0	
Labour win (new seat)				

=== Bedwas ===
Bedwas 1989
Party	Candidate	Votes	%	±%
Labour	R. Woodyatt	1,329	42.8	
Independent	Angus Donaldson°	1,068	34.4	
Plaid Cymru	P. Bevan	635	20.5	
Green	J. Grayland	70	2.3	
Majority			8.4	
Turnout			43.9	
Labour win (new seat)				

=== Bedwellty ===
Bedwellty 1989
Party	Candidate	Votes	%	±%
Labour	M. Collis	1,569	65.5	
Independent	T. Evans	825	34.5	
Majority			31.0	
Turnout			40.9	
Labour win (new seat)				

=== Bettws ===
Bettws 1989
Party	Candidate	Votes	%	±%
Labour	L. Morgan°	unopposed		
Labour win (new seat)				

=== Brackla ===
Brackla 1989
Party	Candidate	Votes	%	±%
SLD	R. Matthews	617	51.5	
Conservative	Ms P. Hacking	576	48.3	
Majority			3.2	
Turnout			23.5	
SLD win (new seat)				

=== Caerau ===
Caerau 1989
Party	Candidate	Votes	%	±%
Labour	V. Hart°	unopposed		
Labour win (new seat)				

=== Cascade ===
Cascade 1989
Party	Candidate	Votes	%	±%
Labour	D. Morgan°	994	59.7	
Plaid Cymru	D. Smith	671	40.3	
Majority			19.4	
Turnout			38.3	
Labour win (new seat)				

=== Cornelly ===
Cornelly 1989
Party	Candidate	Votes	%	±%
Labour	E. Davies°	1,947	88.3	
Conservative	M. Powell	258	11.7	
Majority			76.6	
Turnout			44.3	
Labour win (new seat)				

=== Cwm Garw ===
Cwm Garw 1989
Party	Candidate	Votes	%	±%
Labour	M. Hughes°	unopposed		
Labour win (new seat)				

=== Cwm Ogwr ===
Cwm Ogwr 1989
Party	Candidate	Votes	%	±%
Labour	A. Lock°	1,656	54.4	
Plaid Cymru	J. Jones	1,388	45.6	
Majority			8.8	
Turnout			46.8	
Labour win (new seat)				

=== Cwmbach ===
Cwmbach 1989
Party	Candidate	Votes	%	±%
Labour	I. Jones	1,050	61.3	
Plaid Cymru	T. Jones	662	38.7	
Majority			22.6	
Turnout			45.1	
Labour win (new seat)				

=== Cyfarthfa ===
Cyfarthfa 1989
Party	Candidate	Votes	%	±%
Independent	Ms M. Phillips*	1,416	69.4	
Labour	D. Morrison	623	30.6	
Majority			38.8	
Turnout			42.6	
Independent win (new seat)				

=== Cymmer ===
Cymmer 1989
Party	Candidate	Votes	%	±%
Labour	A. Ellis*	unopposed		
Labour win (new seat)				

=== Darren Valley ===
Darren Valley 1989
Party	Candidate	Votes	%	±%
Labour	R. Edwards°	1,866	76.0	
Plaid Cymru	G. Howells	588	24.0	
Majority			52.0	
Turnout			41.6	
Labour win (new seat)				

=== Dowlais ===
Dowlais 1989
Party	Candidate	Votes	%	±%
Labour	T. Lewis	1,113	48.5	
Ratepayers	W. Healy	1,018	44.3	
Independent	A. Cowdell	165	7.2	
Majority		95	4.2	
Turnout			42.2	
Labour win (new seat)				

=== Ferndale ===
Ferndale 1989
Party	Candidate	Votes	%	±%
Labour	P. Davies*	1,923	52.5	
Plaid Cymru	Glyn James*	1,738	47.5	
Majority			5.0	
Turnout			53.3	
Labour win (new seat)				

=== Gurnos ===
Gurnos 1989
Party	Candidate	Votes	%	±%
Labour	J. Cleary*	unopposed		
Labour win (new seat)				

=== Hirwaun ===
Hirwaun 1989
Party	Candidate	Votes	%	±%
Labour	G. Thomas°	unopposed		
Labour win (new seat)				

=== Laleston ===
Laleston 1989
Party	Candidate	Votes	%	±%
Labour	R. Jenkins°	1,302	58.4	
Conservative	G. Down	642	28.8	
Plaid Cymru	Laura McAllister	285	12.8	
Majority			29.6	
Turnout			40.0	
Labour win (new seat)				

=== Litchard ===
Litchard 1989
Party	Candidate	Votes	%	±%
Labour	M. Ing	1,959	58.1	
Conservative	David Unwin	1,410	41.9	
Majority			16.3	
Turnout			43.9	
Labour win (new seat)				

=== Llanbradach ===
Llanbradach 1989
Party	Candidate	Votes	%	±%
Plaid Cymru	Colin Mann	959	49.5	
Labour	R. Dancock	841	43.4	
Green	G. Brown	137	7.1	
Majority			6.1	
Turnout			41.8	
Plaid Cymru win (new seat)				

=== Llanharan ===
Llanharan 1989
Party	Candidate	Votes	%	±%
Labour	G. Waters°	1,431	70.6	
Plaid Cymru	V. Williams	595	29.4	
Majority			41.2	
Turnout			33.9	
Labour win (new seat)				

=== Llantrisant Town ===
Llantrisant Town 1989
Party	Candidate	Votes	%	±%
Labour	E. Thomas°	1,052	58.3	
Plaid Cymru	Janet Davies	542	30.0	
SLD	D. Morgan	212	11.7	
Majority			28.3	
Turnout			36.5	
Labour win (new seat)				

=== Llantwit Fardre ===
Llantwit Fardre 1989
Party	Candidate	Votes	%	±%
Labour	L. Lodwig°	922	55.9	
Plaid Cymru	D. Watkins	430	26.1	
Independent	R. Bunnage	198	12.0	
SLD	D. Ball	100	6.1	
Majority			29.8	
Turnout			28.1	
Labour win (new seat)				

=== Machen ===
Machen 1989
Party	Candidate	Votes	%	±%
Labour	Ray Davies°	1,625	64.9	
Independent	H. Morgan	880	35.1	
Majority			29.8	
Turnout			48.9	
Labour win (new seat)				

=== Maesteg East ===
Maesteg East 1989
Party	Candidate	Votes	%	±%
Labour	Jeff Jones°	unopposed		
Labour win (new seat)				

=== Maesteg West ===
Maesteg West 1989
Party	Candidate	Votes	%	±%
Labour	L. Jenkins°	1,703	86.6	
Conservative	S. Maddern	263	13.4	
Majority			73.2	
Turnout			40.0	
Labour win (new seat)				

=== Merthyr Vale ===
Merthyr Vale 1989
Party	Candidate	Votes	%	±%
Labour	T. O'Brien°	unopposed		
Labour win (new seat)				

=== Mountain Ash ===
Mountain Ash 1989
Party	Candidate	Votes	%	±%
Plaid Cymru	Pauline Jarman°	1,759	67.7	
Labour	P. Bowen	838	32.2	
Majority			35.5	
Turnout			44.2	
Plaid Cymru win (new seat)				

=== Nelson ===
Nelson 1989
Party	Candidate	Votes	%	±%
Labour	L. Lewis°	1,508	71.4	
Plaid Cymru	P. Williams	604	28.6	
Majority			42.8	
Turnout			38.4	
Labour win (new seat)				

=== Newcastle ===
Newcastle 1989
Party	Candidate	Votes	%	±%
Labour	H. Davies°	1,678	54.1	
Conservative	F. Bertorelli	1,421	45.9	
Majority			8.3	
Turnout			39.3	
Labour win (new seat)				

=== Newcastle Higher ===
Newcastle Higher 1989
Party	Candidate	Votes	%	±%
Labour	S. Gronow°	1,287	61.3	
Conservative	J. Padmore	519	24.7	
Plaid Cymru	B. Williams	292	13.9	
Majority			36.6	
Turnout			43.2	
Labour win (new seat)				

=== Park ===
Park 1989
Party	Candidate	Votes	%	±%
Labour	M. Chambers*	1,463	50.7	
Ratepayers	Eddie Thomas	1,070	37.1	
Plaid Cymru	G. Leyshon	353	12.2	
Majority			13.6	
Turnout			49.2	
Labour win (new seat)				

=== Pencoed ===
Pencoed 1989
Party	Candidate	Votes	%	±%
Labour	W. Philpin°	1,957	72.1	
Conservative	B. Rice	756	27.9	
Majority			44.2	
Turnout			39.1	
Labour win (new seat)				

=== Penrhiwceiber ===
Penrhiwceiber 1989
Party	Candidate	Votes	%	±%
Labour	D. Edwards°	1,104	61.8	
Plaid Cymru	S. Watts	681	38.2	
Majority			23.6	
Turnout			35.2	
Labour win (new seat)				

=== Pentre ===
Pentre 1989
Party	Candidate	Votes	%	±%
Labour	D. Thomas	1,111	58.7	
Plaid Cymru	M. Powell	782	41.3	
Majority			17.4	
Turnout			45.0	
Labour win (new seat)				
