= 1977 Mid Glamorgan County Council election =

1977 Welsh local government election

The 1977 Mid Glamorgan County Council election was held in May 1977 and were the second elections to Mid Glamorgan County Council, electing 85 councillors. It was preceded by the 1973 election and followed by the 1981 election.

== Ward results ==
=== Aberdare No.1: Llwydcoed (two seats) ===
Aberdare No.1: Llwydcoed 1977
Party	Candidate	Votes	%	±%
Labour	J. Powell*	2,009		
Labour	Mervyn Prowle	1,925		
Plaid Cymru	G. Edwards	1,917		
Plaid Cymru	S. Edwards	1,741		
Independent	M. Winter	285		
Turnout			48.2	
Labour hold		Swing		
Labour gain from Plaid Cymru		Swing		

=== Aberdare No.2: Blaengwawr (one seat) ===
Aberdare No.2: Blaengwawr 1977
Party	Candidate	Votes	%	±%
Plaid Cymru	Glyn Owen*	2,320	59.8	−3.2
Labour	H. Cole	1,558	40.2	+3.2
Majority			19.6	−6.5
Turnout			65.4	−0.1
Plaid Cymru hold		Swing		

=== Aberdare No.3: Gadlys (one seat) ===
Aberdare No.3: Gadlys 1977
Party	Candidate	Votes	%	±%
Labour	V. Llywelyn	955	56.8	+16.3
Plaid Cymru	A. Skitt	753	43.2	−16.3
Majority			13.5	
Turnout			59.4	−15.6
Labour gain from Plaid Cymru		Swing		

=== Aberdare No.4: Town (one seat) ===
Aberdare No.4: Town 1977
Party	Candidate	Votes	%	±%
Independent	P. Williams	968	58.5	+3.4
Labour	W. Price	681	41.5	−3.4
Majority			16.9	+6.8
Turnout			47.0	−9.6
Independent hold		Swing		

=== Aberdare No.5: Aberaman (one seat) ===
Aberdare No.5: Aberaman 1977
Party	Candidate	Votes	%	±%
Labour	R. Reed	1,836	58.9	−3.1
Plaid Cymru	D. Barnett	1,281	41.1	+3.1
Majority			17.8	−61.1
Turnout			51.0	−3.2
Labour hold		Swing		

=== Abertridwr and Senghennydd ===
Abertridwr and Senghennydd 1977
Party	Candidate	Votes	%	±%
Ratepayers	J. Davies	1,650	74.6	+5.4
Labour	E. Wright	563	25.4	−5.4
Majority			49.1	+10.8
Turnout			42.5	−8.2
Ratepayers hold		Swing		

=== Bedwas and Machen (two seats) ===
Bedwas and Machen 1977
Party	Candidate	Votes	%	±%
Labour	Ray Davies	2,580		
Labour	C. Hobbs	2,117		
Liberal	Angus Donaldson	2,088		
Plaid Cymru	T. Davies	1,129		
Conservative	E. Haines	902		
Plaid Cymru	E. Lewis	783		
Independent	I. Edwards	542		
Turnout				
Labour hold		Swing		
Labour hold		Swing		

=== Bedwellty No.1 Aberbargoed (one seat) ===
Bedwellty No.1 Aberbargoed 1977
Party	Candidate	Votes	%	±%
Plaid Cymru	K. Szerard	908	53.6	
Labour	W. Forbes*	785	46.4	
Majority			7.3	
Turnout			56.7	−0.1
Plaid Cymru gain from Labour		Swing		

=== Bedwellty No.2 Abertysswg (one seat) ===
Bedwellty No.2 Abertysswg 1977
Party	Candidate	Votes	%	±%
Plaid Cymru	I. Evans	1,440	57.6	+57.6
Labour	S. Powell*	1,062	42.4	−24.8
Majority			15.1	
Turnout			58.0	+0.3
Plaid Cymru gain from Labour		Swing		

=== Bridgend (two seats) ===
Alfred Bowen, who had represented Bridgend on the old Glamorgan County Council prior to re-organization, lost his seat to the Conservatives.

Bridgend 1977
Party	Candidate	Votes	%	±%
Conservative	A. Parker*	2,747		
Conservative	W. Rutter	2,346		
Labour	Alfred Bowen*	1,616		
Labour	K. Morgan	1,474		
Ratepayers	E. King	1,281		
Ratepayers	G. Morris	980		
Plaid Cymru	D. Jones	491		
Plaid Cymru	E. Lewis	467		
Turnout			53.8	
Conservative hold		Swing		
Conservative gain from Labour		Swing		

=== Caerphilly No.1 (one seat) ===
Caerphilly No.1 1977
Party	Candidate	Votes	%	±%
Labour	L. Lewis	1,040	51.0	+51.0
Plaid Cymru	A. Jewell	742	36.4	+36.4
Conservative	E. Evans	257	12.6	+12.6
Majority			14.6	
Turnout			64.8	
Labour hold		Swing		

=== Caerphilly No.2 Llanbradach (one seat) ===
Caerphilly No.2 Llanbradach 1977
Party	Candidate	Votes	%	±%
Plaid Cymru	Colin Mann	1,249	51.0	−23.8
Labour	E. White	815	33.3	+8.1
Conservative	E. Edwards	387	15.8	+15.8
Majority			17.7	−31.8
Turnout			55.4	−3.5
Plaid Cymru hold		Swing		

=== Caerphilly No.4 (one seat) ===
Lindsay Whittle unseated Bertie Rowland, who had represented Caerphilly on the former Glamorgan County Council.

Caerphilly No.4 1977
Party	Candidate	Votes	%	±%
Plaid Cymru	Lindsay Whittle	1,340	38.2	+2.3
Labour	Bertie Rowland*	1,331	40.2	−21.6
Conservative	R. Lea	640	19.3	+19.3
Majority		9	0.3	
Turnout			48.9	+7.4
Plaid Cymru gain from Labour		Swing		

=== Caerphilly No.5 North (one seat) ===
Caerphilly No.5 North 1977
Party	Candidate	Votes	%	±%
Labour	R. Jewell	1,012	51.2	−0.6
Plaid Cymru	A. Hallett	674	34.1	+34.1
Conservative	B. Williams	146	7.4	+7.4
Ratepayers	V. Evans	146	7.4	+7.4
Majority			17.1	+13.6
Turnout			46.5	+4.9
Labour hold		Swing		

=== Caerphilly No.6 South (one seat) ===
Caerphilly No.6 South 1977
Party	Candidate	Votes	%	±%
Independent	H. Richards	781	33.4	−20.1
Labour	G. Snell	652	27.9	−18.6
Ratepayers	A. Goodchild	465	19.9	+19.9
Independent	M. Ryland	443	18.9	+18.9
Majority			5.5	−1.5
Turnout			52.8	+2.8
Independent hold		Swing		

=== Caerphilly No.7 (one seat) ===
Caerphilly No.7 1973
Party	Candidate	Votes	%	±%
Plaid Cymru	R. Davies	921	32.7	
Conservative	H. Paulley	780	27.7	
Labour	G. Lewis	618	22.0	
Independent Labour	E. Dobbs	496	17.6	
Majority			5.0	
Turnout				
Plaid Cymru hold		Swing		

=== Cardiff Rural (one seat) ===
Cardiff Rural 1973
Party	Candidate	Votes	%	±%
Labour	C. Richards	701	36.3	−18.1
Plaid Cymru	P. Enticott	622	32.2	−13.4
Conservative	P. Dawkins	347	18.0	+18.0
Ratepayers	A. Skelhorne	260	13.5	+13.5
Majority			4.1	−4.7
Turnout			53.7	+13.7
Labour hold		Swing		

=== Cowbridge Rural (one seat) ===
Cowbridge Rural 1977
Party	Candidate	Votes	%	±%
Independent	J. David	1,618	62.6	+9.9
Plaid Cymru	Janet Davies	966	37.4	+37.4
Majority			25.2	+19.9
Turnout			47.5	−4.6
Independent hold		Swing		

=== Dowlais (one seat) ===
Dowlais 1977
Party	Candidate	Votes	%	±%
Labour	T. Lewis	1,245	47.9	−2.4
Plaid Cymru	P. Jones	1,214	46.7	+46.7
Liberal	D. Smith	140	5.4	+5.4
Majority		31	1.2	+0.6
Turnout			55.0	+3.4
Labour hold		Swing		

=== Gelligaer No.1 (one seat) ===
Gelligaer No.1 1977
Party	Candidate	Votes	%	±%
Plaid Cymru	G. Howells	1,492	47.4	+15.8
Labour	B. Williams*	1,449	46.0	−22.4
Conservative	W. Morgan	210	6.7	+6.7
Majority			1.4	
Turnout			57.2	+1.4
Plaid Cymru gain from Labour		Swing		

=== Gelligaer No.2 (one seat) ===
Davies was elected as an Independent Labour candidate in 1973.

Gelligaer No.2 1977
Party	Candidate	Votes	%	±%
Labour	J. Davies	1,087	68.1	+26.7
Plaid Cymru	G. Roberts	509	31.9	+31.9
Majority			36.2	
Turnout			54.9	−6.0
Labour gain from Independent Labour		Swing		

=== Gelligaer No.3 (one seat) ===
Gelligaer No.3 1977
Party	Candidate	Votes	%	±%
Plaid Cymru	J. Jones	1,710	48.2	−0.4
Labour	I. Jenkins	1,490	42.0	−9.4
Conservative	B. Newman	351	9.9	+9.9
Majority			6.2	
Turnout			52.3	+8.9
Plaid Cymru gain from Labour		Swing		

=== Gelligaer No.4 (two seats) ===
Gelligaer No.4 1977
Party	Candidate	Votes	%	±%
Labour	A. Rogers*	2,803		
Labour	W. Bowen*	2,693		
Plaid Cymru	A. Evans	1,533		
Plaid Cymru	N. Turner	1,441		
Conservative	C. Collins	550		
Conservative	R. Owen	529		
Turnout			49.0	+13.6
Labour hold		Swing		
Labour hold		Swing		

=== Llantrisant and Llantwitfardre No.1 (four seats) ===
Llantrisant and Llantwitfardre No.1 1977
Party	Candidate	Votes	%	±%
Labour	K. Eason*	3,398		
Ratepayers	T. John*	3,098		
Labour	L. Lodwig*	3,067		
Labour	A. Tyrrell*	2,801		
Labour	N. James	2,747		
Conservative	R. Bunnage	2,636		
Conservative	D. Pearse	2,594		
Ratepayers	D. Brown	2,446		
Plaid Cymru	T. Jones	2,332		
Plaid Cymru	T. Phillips	2,252		
Plaid Cymru	D. Morris	2,130		
Plaid Cymru	R. Kennard	2,038		
Liberal	R. Verallo	884		
Turnout			63.8	
Labour hold		Swing		
Ratepayers hold		Swing		
Labour hold		Swing		
Labour hold		Swing		

=== Llantrisant and Llantwitfardre No.2 (two seats) ===
Llantrisant and Llantwitfardre No.2 1977
Party	Candidate	Votes	%	±%
Labour	D. McDonald	2,867		
Labour	J. Thomas	2,167		
Independent	E. Brinson	1,357		
Plaid Cymru	D. Davies	1,305		
Plaid Cymru	J. Jones	1,199		
Conservative	A. Farnworth	368		
Turnout			58.8	
Labour hold		Swing		
Labour hold		Swing		

=== Maesteg No.1 (one seat) ===
Maesteg No.1 1977
Party	Candidate	Votes	%	±%
Labour	V. Hart	2,023	69.7	
Plaid Cymru	D. Lewis	678	23.3	
Conservative	M. Rixon	203	7.0	
Majority			46.3	
Turnout			54.3	
Labour hold		Swing		

=== Maesteg No.2 (one seat) ===
Maesteg No.2 1977
Party	Candidate	Votes	%	±%
Liberal	Jennie Gibbs	1,365	59.5	−6.4
Labour	W. Hayes	758	33.0	−1.1
Conservative	K. Rowe	172	7.5	
Majority			26.4	−5.5
Turnout			54.3	−5.3
Liberal hold		Swing		

=== Maesteg No.3 (one seat) ===
Maesteg No.3 1977
Party	Candidate	Votes	%	±%
Labour	W. Venner	1,428	56.5	−17.5
Plaid Cymru	T. Pearson	720	28.5	+2.5
Conservative	G. Jones	378	15.0	
Majority			28.0	−19.9
Turnout			49.8	+3.9
Labour hold		Swing		

=== Merthyr, Cyfarthfa (one seat) ===
Merthyr, Cyfarthfa 1977
Party	Candidate	Votes	%	±%
Plaid Cymru	M. Phillips	1,474	53.9	
Labour	D. Jones*	1,083	39.6	
Liberal	D. Williams	165	6.5	
Majority				
Turnout				
Plaid Cymru gain from Labour		Swing		

=== Merthyr No.6 (one seat) ===
Merthyr No.6 1977
Party	Candidate	Votes	%	±%
Labour	E. Griffiths	1,614		
Plaid Cymru	B. Richards	1,192		
Communist	R. Evans	106		
Majority				
Turnout			69.1	−5.3
Labour hold		Swing		

=== Merthyr No.7 (one seat) ===
Merthyr No.7 1977
Party	Candidate	Votes	%	±%
Labour	T. O'Brien	1,344		
Plaid Cymru	J. Gough	980		
Majority				
Turnout				
Labour hold		Swing		

=== Merthyr Park (two seats) ===
Merthyr Park 1977
Party	Candidate	Votes	%	±%
Labour	J. Burns*	1,956		
Plaid Cymru	G. Foster*	1,840		
Labour	D. Williams	1,584		
Plaid Cymru	C. Mathews	1,521		
Conservative	C. Thomas	620		
Communist	A. Jones	539		
Liberal	G. Cooper	288		
Communist	C. Dennett	161		
Liberal	D. Bettel-Higgins	152		
Turnout			60.1	+3.1
Labour hold		Swing		
Plaid Cymru hold		Swing		

=== Merthyr Town (one seat) ===
Merthyr Town 1977
Party	Candidate	Votes	%	±%
Labour	T. Davies	1,277		
Plaid Cymru	L. Smith	813		
Conservative	D. Davies	582		
Communist	T. Roberts	112		
Liberal	O. Bettel-Higgins	35		
Majority				
Turnout				
Labour hold		Swing		

=== Mountain Ash No.1 (one seat) ===
Mountain Ash No.1 1977
Party	Candidate	Votes	%	±%
Labour	T. Davies*	1,662		
Plaid Cymru	C. Jones	1,086		
Communist	A. Williams	974		
Majority				
Turnout				
Labour hold		Swing		

=== Mountain Ash No.2 (one seat) ===
Mountain Ash No.2 1977
Party	Candidate	Votes	%	±%
Plaid Cymru	N. Thomas	1,066		
Independent	P. Brocklebank	877		
Labour	F. Brooks	789		
Majority				
Turnout				
Plaid Cymru gain from Labour		Swing		

=== Mountain Ash No.3 (two seats) ===
Mountain Ash No.3 1977
Party	Candidate	Votes	%	±%
Labour	S. Lloyd	1,940		
Plaid Cymru	R. Humphreys*	1,797		
Plaid Cymru	G. Owens	1,736		
Labour	H. Evans	1,734		
Turnout				
Labour gain from Communist		Swing		
Plaid Cymru hold		Swing		

=== Ogmore and Garw No.1 (one seat) ===
Ogmore and Garw No.1 1977
Party	Candidate	Votes	%	±%
Ratepayers	Danny Mordecai	1,263		
Labour	M. David	948		
Plaid Cymru	G. Jones	148		
Majority				
Turnout				
Ratepayers gain from Labour		Swing		

=== Ogmore and Garw No.2 (two seats) ===
Ogmore and Garw No.2 1977
Party	Candidate	Votes	%	±%
Labour	T. Price*	2,476		
Plaid Cymru	E. Merriman*	2,428		
Labour	A. Lock	2,364		
Plaid Cymru	J. Jones	1,590		
Conservative	J. Fenwick	569		
Conservative	M. Eade	487		
Turnout				
Labour hold		Swing		
Plaid Cymru hold		Swing		

=== Penybont No.1 (one seat) ===
Penybont No.1 1977
Party	Candidate	Votes	%	±%
Conservative	L. Walters	1,081	38.3	
Labour	E. Hayball*	1,002	35.5	
Ratepayers	I. Evans	514	18.2	
Plaid Cymru	P. Tomlin	227	8.0	
Majority				
Turnout				
Conservative gain from Labour		Swing		

=== Penybont No.2 (one seat) ===
Penybont No.2 1977
Party	Candidate	Votes	%	±%
Conservative	W. Board	1,064		
Independent	D. Thomas	783		
Liberal	S. Clark	375		
Independent	D. Davies	149		
Turnout			55.1	
Conservative hold		Swing		

=== Penybont No.3 (one seat) ===
Penybont No.3 1977
Party	Candidate	Votes	%	±%
Conservative	J. Spurgeon	1,195	41.9	
Labour	A. Cattle	1,186	41.6	
Plaid Cymru	D. Williams	470	16.5	
Majority				
Turnout			45.8	
Conservative gain from Labour		Swing		

=== Penybont No.4 (one seat) ===
Penybont No.4 1977
Party	Candidate	Votes	%	±%
Conservative	David Unwin	1,253	41.3	
Labour	G. Stevens	755	24.9	
Ratepayers	A. Elliott	651	21.5	
Plaid Cymru	S. Thomas	373	12.3	
Majority				
Turnout			47.2	
Conservative gain from Labour		Swing		

=== Penybont No.5 (two seats) ===
Penybont No.5 1977
Party	Candidate	Votes	%	±%
Labour	E. Davies*	2,949		
Labour	M. Jones*	2,911		
Plaid Cymru	V. Morgan-Thornton	1,598		
Plaid Cymru	R. Lewis	1,338		
Conservative	P. Davis	1,160		
Conservative	P. Rixon	984		
Raetepayers	A. Gordon-Cranmer	591		
Turnout			58.6	
Labour hold		Swing		
Labour hold		Swing		

=== Penybont No.6 (two seats) ===
Penybont No.6 1977
Party	Candidate	Votes	%	±%
Labour	Philip Squire*	1,994		
Independent	W. Barnett*	1,637		
Labour	G. Walters	1,562		
Independent	M. Kennedy	1,263		
Plaid Cymru	G. Charles	743		
Plaid Cymru	D. Jones	649		
Turnout			57.6	
Labour hold		Swing		
Independent hold		Swing		

=== Penydarren (one seat) ===
Penydarren 1977
Party	Candidate	Votes	%	±%
Labour	T. Mahoney*	1,500	60.2	
Plaid Cymru	J. Price	823	33.0	
Liberal	J. Lewis	170	6.8	
Majority				
Turnout			52.9	
Labour hold		Swing		

=== Pontypridd No.1 (one seat) ===
Pontypridd No.1 1977
Party	Candidate	Votes	%	±%
Labour	W. Williams*	842	39.3	
Plaid Cymru	S. Holcombe	743	34.7	
Independent	K. James	411	19.2	
Conservative	M. Farnworth	147	6.9	
Turnout			54.2	
Labour hold		Swing		

=== Pontypridd No.2 Town (one seat) ===
Pontypridd No.2 Town 1977
Party	Candidate	Votes	%	±%
Labour	W. Jones	791	33.4	
Plaid Cymru	S. Goodwin	704	29.7	
Liberal	B. Murphy	667	28.2	
Conservative	M. Davis	207	8.7	
Majority				
Turnout			53.7	
Labour hold		Swing		

=== Pontypridd No.3 (one seat) ===
Pontypridd No.3 1977
Party	Candidate	Votes	%	±%
Labour	E. Peck*	1,141	90.1	
Conservative	J. Bunnage	125	9.9	
Majority				
Turnout			58.6	
Labour hold		Swing		

=== Pontypridd No.4 Trallwn (one seat) ===
Pontypridd No.4 Trallwn 1977
Party	Candidate	Votes	%	±%
Liberal	Meriel Murphy*	990	49.7	
Labour	S. Cody	458	23.0	
Plaid Cymru	R. Jones	393	19.7	
Conservative	S. Schofield	150	7.5	
Majority				
Turnout			62.9	
Liberal hold		Swing		

=== Pontypridd No.5 Rhydyfelin (one seat) ===
Pontypridd No.5 Rhydyfelin 1977
Party	Candidate	Votes	%	±%
Labour	J. Davies*	1,103	40.7	
Independent	K. Williams	869	32.0	
Plaid Cymru	C. Holloway	490	18.1	
Conservative	J. Beynon	251	9.3	
Turnout			39.2	
Labour hold		Swing		

=== Pontypridd No.6 (one seat) ===
Pontypridd No.6 1977
Party	Candidate	Votes	%	±%
Labour	H. Weston*	1,180	44.5	
Liberal	R. Mathews	542	20.5	
Plaid Cymru	E. Henly	522	19.7	
Conservative	L. Jarman	406	15.3	
Majority				
Turnout			50.3	
Labour hold		Swing		

=== Porthcawl No.1 (one seat) ===
Porthcawl No.1 1977
Party	Candidate	Votes	%	±%
Conservative	Peter Hubbard-Miles*	1,959	58.5	
Ratepayers	Chris Smart	569	17.0	
Labour	D. Wilcox	563	16.8	
Plaid Cymru	W. Thomas	257	7.7	
Majority				
Turnout			48.1	
Conservative hold		Swing		

=== Porthcawl No.2 (one seat) ===
Porthcawl No.2 1977
Party	Candidate	Votes	%	±%
Conservative	H. Eastment	1,312	52.0	
Labour	G. McBride*	962	38.1	
Plaid Cymru	R. Fattorini	249	9.9	
Majority				
Turnout			49.4	
Conservative gain from Labour		Swing		

=== Rhondda No.1 Treherbert (two seats) ===
Rhondda No.1 Treherbert 1977
Party	Candidate	Votes	%	±%
Communist	Arthur True*	2,143		
Labour	G. Williams	1,694		
Labour	H. Elliott	1,293		
Turnout			62.9	
Communist hold		Swing		
Labour hold		Swing		

=== Rhondda No.2 Treorchy (two seats) ===
Rhondda No.2 Treorchy 1977
Party	Candidate	Votes	%	±%
Labour	H. Jones*	1,988		
Labour	G. Rees*	2,007		
Plaid Cymru	P. Davies	1,496		
Plaid Cymru	R. Davies	1,455		
Independent	J. Samson	385		
Turnout			59.9	
Labour hold		Swing		
Labour hold		Swing		

=== Rhondda No.3 Pentre (one seat) ===
Rhondda No.3 Pentre 1977
Party	Candidate	Votes	%	±%
Labour	E. Jenkins*	1,361	52.1	
Plaid Cymru	M. John	582	22.3	
Conservative	D. Gillespie	356	13.6	
Independent	R. Betteney	311	11.9	
Majority				
Turnout			59.2	
Labour hold		Swing		

=== Rhondda No.4 Ystrad (one seat) ===
Rhondda No.4 Ystrad 1977
Party	Candidate	Votes	%	±%
Labour	D. Thomas*	1,397	53.1	
Plaid Cymru	D. Jones	809	30.7	
Communist	A. Price	426	16.2	
Majority				
Turnout			52.8	
Labour hold		Swing		

=== Rhondda No.5 (one seat) ===
Rhondda No.5 1977
Party	Candidate	Votes	%	±%
Plaid Cymru	D. Morgan	1,455	42.6	
Labour	T. Parry*	1,397	40.9	
Conservative	Alan Speake	567	16.6	
Majority				
Turnout			61.5	
Plaid Cymru gain from Labour		Swing		

=== Rhondda No.6 (one seat) ===
Rhondda No.6 1977
Party	Candidate	Votes	%	±%
Labour	C. Winter*	1,463	44.3	
Conservative	P. Leyshon	1,416	42.9	
Plaid Cymru	A. Jones	421	12.8	
Majority				
Turnout			56.0	
Labour hold		Swing		

=== Rhondda No.7 Penygraig (one seat) ===
Rhondda No.7 Penygraig 1977
Party	Candidate	Votes	%	±%
Labour	C. Richards*	1,262	48.5	
Conservative	C. Lindsey	730	28.1	
Plaid Cymru	G. Jones	608	23.4	
Majority				
Turnout			47.0	
Labour hold		Swing		

=== Rhondda No.8 Porth (two seats) ===
Rhondda No.8 Porth 1977
Party	Candidate	Votes	%	±%
Labour	A. Ellis*	1,828		
Labour	L. Rees	1,693		
Ratepayers	T. Jones	1,507		
Ratepayers	E. Fitsall	1,454		
Conservative	R. Tomkinson	650		
Turnout			48.9	
Labour hold		Swing		
Labour hold		Swing		

=== Rhondda No.9 (one seat) ===
Rhondda No.9 1977
Party	Candidate	Votes	%	±%
Ratepayers	D. May	1,135	40.3	
Labour	S. McElstrim*	1,122	39.8	
Plaid Cymru	M. Fisk	560	19.9	
Majority		13		
Turnout			61.6	
Ratepayers gain from Labour		Swing		

=== Rhymney Lower, Middle and Upper (one seat) ===
Rhymney Lower, Middle and Upper 1977
Party	Candidate	Votes	%	±%
Labour	J. Williams*	1,646	71.9	
Plaid Cymru	A. Lippiett	644	28.1	
Majority				
Turnout			51.5	
Labour hold		Swing		

=== Treharris (one seat) ===
Treharris 1977
Party	Candidate	Votes	%	±%
Labour	T. Richards*	1,477	67.5	
Plaid Cymru	M. Moran	711	32.5	
Majority				
Turnout			51.2	
Labour hold		Swing		

=== Vaynor and Penderyn No.1 (one seat) ===
Vaynor and Penderyn No.1 1977
Party	Candidate	Votes	%	±%
Plaid Cymru	C. Harris	991	52.3	
Labour	M. Byrne*	905	47.7	
Majority				
Turnout			62.5	
Plaid Cymru gain from Labour		Swing		

=== Vaynor and Penderyn No.2 (one seat) ===
Vaynor and Penderyn No.2 1977
Party	Candidate	Votes	%	±%
Labour	T. Smith	729	42.6	
Plaid Cymru	P. Williams	606	35.4	
Conservative	A. Hodges	257	15.0	
Liberal	A. Jenkins	121	7.1	
Majority				
Turnout			64.4	
Labour hold		Swing		
