= 1973 Mid Glamorgan County Council election =

1973 Welsh local government election

The first election to Mid Glamorgan County Council was held in April 1973. It was followed by the 1977 election.

The new authority came into effect from 1 April 1974 following the division of the former Glamorgan County Council into three new authorities.

== Candidates ==
The Labour Party fielded candidates in every ward. A significant proportion of seats were contested by the Conservative Party and Plaid Cymru with fewer candidates fielded by the Liberal Party.

Numerous members of the former Glamorgan County Council stood for election, notably for Labour. These included Alfred Bowen (Bridgend) and Bertie Rowland (Caerphilly).

Fred Riddiford, former Labour councillor for Aberaman on the former Glamorgan authority, contested the seat for Plaid Cymru.

== Ward results ==
=== Aberdare No.1: Llwydcoed (two seats) ===
Aberdare No.1: Llwydcoed 1973
Party	Candidate	Votes	%	±%
Plaid Cymru	D. Davies	2,984		
Labour	J. Powell	2,132		
Labour	Mervyn Prowle	1,936		
Plaid Cymru	Riddiford	1,250		
Communist	Alastair Wilson	1,222		
Turnout				
Plaid Cymru win (new seat)				
Labour win (new seat)				

=== Aberdare No.2: Blaengwawr (one seat) ===
Aberdare No.2: Blaengwawr 1973
Party	Candidate	Votes	%	±%
Plaid Cymru	Glyn Owen	2,405	63.0	
Labour	W. Parfitt	1,410	37.0	
Majority			26.1	
Turnout			65.5	
Plaid Cymru win (new seat)				

=== Aberdare No.3: Gadlys (one seat) ===
Aberdare No.3: Gadlys 1973
Party	Candidate	Votes	%	±%
Plaid Cymru	D. Roberts	1,402	59.5	
Labour	A. Jones	955	40.5	
Majority			19.0	
Turnout			59.4	
Plaid Cymru win (new seat)				

=== Aberdare No.4: Town (one seat) ===
Aberdare No.4: Town 1973
Party	Candidate	Votes	%	±%
Independent	P. Williams	1,083	55.1	
Labour	W. Richards	884	44.9	
Majority			10.1	
Turnout			56.6	
Independent win (new seat)				

=== Aberdare No.5: Aberaman (one seat) ===
Aberdare No.5: Aberaman 1973
Party	Candidate	Votes	%	±%
Labour	R. Reed	2,050	62.0	
Plaid Cymru	Fred Riddiford	1,259	38.0	
Majority			23.9	
Turnout			54.3	
Labour win (new seat)				

=== Abertridwr and Senghennydd ===
Abertridwr and Senghennydd 1973
Party	Candidate	Votes	%	±%
Ratepayers	J. Davies	1,823	69.2	
Labour	T. Mantle	813	30.8	
Majority			38.3	
Turnout			50.7	
Independent win (new seat)				

=== Bedwas and Machen (two seats) ===
Bedwas and Machen 1973
Party	Candidate	Votes	%	±%
Labour	Ray Davies	2.994		
Labour	C. Hobbs	2.701		
Ratepayers	A. Underwood	1,682		
Turnout				
Labour win (new seat)				
Labour win (new seat)				

=== Bedwellty No.1 (one seat) ===
Bedwellty No.1 1973
Party	Candidate	Votes	%	±%
Labour	W. Forbes	Unopposed		
Labour win (new seat)				

=== Bedwellty No.2 (one seat) ===
Bedwellty No.2 1973
Party	Candidate	Votes	%	±%
Labour	S. Powell	1,648	67.2	
Independent	M. Lancaster	803	32.8	
Majority			34.5	
Turnout			57.6	
Labour win (new seat)				

=== Bridgend (two seats) ===
Bridgend 1973
Party	Candidate	Votes	%	±%
Labour	Alfred Bowen	2,447		
Conservative	A. Parker	2,447		
Labour	D. Evans	1,711		
Conservative	A. Walters	1,643		
Independent	E. King	1,319		
Independent	W. Davies	1,091		
Turnout				
Labour win (new seat)				
Conservative win (new seat)				

=== Caerphilly No.1 (one seat) ===
Caerphilly No.1 1973
Party	Candidate	Votes	%	±%
Labour	C. Phillips	Unopposed		
Labour win (new seat)				

=== Caerphilly No.2 Llanbradach (one seat) ===
Caerphilly No.2 Llanbradach 1973
Party	Candidate	Votes	%	±%
Plaid Cymru	S. Morgan	1,945	74.8	
Labour	S. Hawthorn	657	25.2	
Majority			49.5	
Turnout			58.9	
Plaid Cymru win (new seat)				

=== Caerphilly No.4 (one seat) ===
Caerphilly No.4 1973
Party	Candidate	Votes	%	±%
Labour	Bertie Rowland	1,733	61.8	
Plaid Cymru	Colin Palfrey	1,069	38.2	
Majority			23.7	
Turnout			41.5	
Labour win (new seat)				

=== Caerphilly No.5 North (one seat) ===
Caerphilly No.5 North 1973
Party	Candidate	Votes	%	±%
Labour	R. Jewell	914	51.8	
Independent	L. Waddon	852	48.2	
Majority			3.5	
Turnout			41.6	
Labour win (new seat)				

=== Caerphilly No.6 South (one seat) ===
Caerphilly No.6 South 1973
Party	Candidate	Votes	%	±%
Independent	H. Richards	1,182	53.5	
Labour	G. Snell	1,027	46.5	
Majority			7.0	
Turnout			50.0	
Independent win (new seat)				

=== Caerphilly No.7 (one seat) ===
Caerphilly No.7 1973
Party	Candidate	Votes	%	±%
Plaid Cymru	R. Davies	921	32.7	
Conservative	H. Paulley	780	27.7	
Labour	G. Lewis	618	22.0	
Independent Labour	E. Dobbs	496	17.6	
Majority			5.0	
Turnout				
Plaid Cymru win (new seat)				

=== Cardiff Rural (one seat) ===
Cardiff Rural 1973
Party	Candidate	Votes	%	±%
Labour	C. Richards	780	54.4	
Plaid Cymru	P. Enticott	654	45.6	
Majority			8.8	
Turnout			40.0	
Labour win (new seat)				

=== Cowbridge Rural (one seat) ===
Cowbridge Rural 1973
Party	Candidate	Votes	%	±%
Independent	J. David	1,491	52.7	
Labour	T. Williams	1,340	47.3	
Majority			5.3	
Turnout			52.1	
Independent win (new seat)				

=== Dowlais (one seat) ===
Dowlais 1973
Party	Candidate	Votes	%	±%
Labour	D. Williams	1,222	50.3	
Ratepayers	W. Healey	1,209	49.7	
Majority		13	0.6	
Turnout			51.6	
Labour win (new seat)				

=== Gelligaer No.1 (one seat) ===
Gelligaer No.1 1973
Party	Candidate	Votes	%	±%
Labour	B. Williams	2,095	68.4	
Plaid Cymru	G. Thomas	970	31.6	
Majority			36.7	
Turnout			55.8	
Labour win (new seat)				

=== Gelligaer No.2 (one seat) ===
Gelligaer No.2 1973
Party	Candidate	Votes	%	±%
Independent Labour	J. Davies	1,036	58.6	
Labour	J. Hawke	732	41.4	
Majority			17.2	
Turnout			60.9	
Independent Labour win (new seat)				

=== Gelligaer No.3 (one seat) ===
Gelligaer No.3 1973
Party	Candidate	Votes	%	±%
Labour	W. Kedward	1,510	51.4	
Plaid Cymru	M. Jones	1,426	48.6	
Majority			2.9	
Turnout			43.4	
Labour win (new seat)				

=== Gelligaer No.4 (two seats) ===
Gelligaer No.4 1973
Party	Candidate	Votes	%	±%
Labour	A. Rogers	2,314		
Labour	W. Bowen	2,160		
Plaid Cymru	M. Smiga	1,202		
Plaid Cymru	G. Phillips	1,147		
Turnout			35.4	
Labour win (new seat)				
Labour win (new seat)				

=== Llantrisant and Llantwitfardre No.1 (four seats) ===
Llantrisant and Llantwitfardre No.1 1973
Party	Candidate	Votes	%	±%
Labour	K. Eason	3,231		
Labour	L. Lodwig	2,925		
Labour	E. Tyrrell	2,716		
Ratepayers	T. John	2,692		
Labour	D. Powell	2,669		
Ratepayers	W. Taylor	2,351		
Ratepayers	J. Bolt	2,100		
Ratepayers	D. Pearse	1,944		
Plaid Cymru	T. Morgan	1,697		
Residents	A. Williams	1,584		
Residents	J. Johnson	1,337		
Residents	A. Pictor	1,111		
Turnout			47.7	
Labour win (new seat)				
Labour win (new seat)				
Labour win (new seat)				
Independent win (new seat)				

=== Llantrisant and Llantwitfardre No.2 (four seats) ===
Llantrisant and Llantwitfardre No.2 1973
Party	Candidate	Votes	%	±%
Labour	D. McDonald	Unopposed		
Labour	J. Thomas	Unopposed		
Labour win (new seat)				
Labour win (new seat)				

=== Maesteg No.1 (one seat) ===
Maesteg No.1 1973
Party	Candidate	Votes	%	±%
Labour	V. Hart	Unopposed		
Labour win (new seat)				

=== Maesteg No.2 (one seat) ===
Maesteg No.2 1973
Party	Candidate	Votes	%	±%
Liberal	Jennie Gibbs	1,659	65.9	
Labour	W. Evans	857	34.1	
Majority			31.9	
Turnout			59.6	
Liberal win (new seat)				

=== Maesteg No.3 (one seat) ===
Maesteg No.3 1973
Party	Candidate	Votes	%	±%
Labour	W. Venner	1,718	74.0	
Plaid Cymru	K. Davies	605	26.0	
Majority			47.9	
Turnout			45.9	
Labour win (new seat)				

=== Merthyr, Cyfarthfa (one seat) ===
Merthyr, Cyfarthfa 1973
Party	Candidate	Votes	%	±%
Labour	D. Jones	1,374	60.4	
Plaid Cymru	M. Llewellyn	901	39.6	
Majority			20.8	
Turnout			45.5	
Labour win (new seat)				

=== Merthyr No.6 (one seat) ===
Merthyr No.6 1973
Party	Candidate	Votes	%	±%
Labour	C. Stanfield	1,614	51.6	
Plaid Cymru	Emrys Roberts	1,515	48.4	
Majority			3.2	
Turnout			74.4	
Labour win (new seat)				

=== Merthyr No.7 (one seat) ===
Merthyr No.7 1973
Party	Candidate	Votes	%	±%
Labour	T. O'Brien	1,468	65.8	
Plaid Cymru	A. Williams	764	34.2	
Majority			31.5	
Turnout			69.2	
Labour win (new seat)				

=== Merthyr Park (two seats) ===
Merthyr Park 1973
Party	Candidate	Votes	%	±%
Plaid Cymru	G. Foster	1,977		
Labour	J. Burns	1,682		
Labour	D. Williams	1,619		
Communist	A. Jones	1,442		
Communist	C. Dennett	404		
Turnout			56.9	
Plaid Cymru win (new seat)				
Labour win (new seat)				

=== Merthyr Town (one seat) ===
Merthyr Town 1973
Party	Candidate	Votes	%	±%
Labour	B. Watkins	1,510	60.3	
Plaid Cymru	P. Williams	811	32.4	
Communist	T. Roberts	184	7.4	
Majority			27.9	
Turnout			51.4	
Labour win (new seat)				

=== Mountain Ash No.1 (one seat) ===
Mountain Ash No.1 1973
Party	Candidate	Votes	%	±%
Labour	T. Davies	1,557	53.6	
Communist	A. Williams	1,348	46.4	
Majority			7.2	
Turnout			47.3	
Labour win (new seat)				

=== Mountain Ash No.2 (one seat) ===
Mountain Ash No.2 1973
Party	Candidate	Votes	%	±%
Labour	E. Bath	Unopposed		
Labour win (new seat)				

=== Mountain Ash No.3 (two seats) ===
Mountain Ash No.3 1973
Party	Candidate	Votes	%	±%
Communist	M. Lewis	2,426		
Plaid Cymru	R. Humphreys	2,332		
Labour	E. Pritchard	1,544		
Labour	T. Bowden	1,210		
Turnout			74.3	
Communist win (new seat)				
Plaid Cymru win (new seat)				

=== Ogmore and Garw No.1 (one seat) ===
Ogmore and Garw No.1 1973
Party	Candidate	Votes	%	±%
Labour	R. Sant	1,291	50.5	
Ratepayers	D. Fox	1,264	49.5	
Majority		27	1.0	
Turnout			76.1	
Labour win (new seat)				

=== Ogmore and Garw No.2 (two seats) ===
Ogmore and Garw No.2 1973
Party	Candidate	Votes	%	±%
Plaid Cymru	E. Merriman	4,122		
Labour	T. Price	3,312		
Labour	M. Jenkins	2,748		
Turnout			71.9	
Plaid Cymru win (new seat)				
Labour win (new seat)				

=== Penybont No.1 (one seat) ===
Penybont No.1 1973
Party	Candidate	Votes	%	±%
Labour	E. Hayball	1,561	70.6	
Conservative	K. Morrell	651	29.4	
Majority			41.1	
Turnout			40.5	
Labour win (new seat)				

=== Penybont No.2 (two seats) ===
Penybont No.2 1973
Party	Candidate	Votes	%	±%
Conservative	W. Board	958		
Labour	A. Evans	609		
Labour	F. Speed	448		
Turnout			46.9	
Conservative win (new seat)				
Labour win (new seat)				

=== Penybont No.3 (one seat) ===
Penybont No.3
Party	Candidate	Votes	%	±%
Labour	A. Cattie	981	41.9	
Independent	T. Williams	681	29.2	
Independent	R. Hanson	673	28.9	
Majority			12.7	
Turnout			37.6	
Labour win (new seat)				

=== Penybont No.4 (one seat) ===
Penybont No.4
Party	Candidate	Votes	%	±%
Labour	I. Rawle	1,306	55.5	
Conservative	B. Smart	1,049	45.5	
Majority			10.0	
Turnout			36.7	
Labour win (new seat)				

=== Penybont No.5 (two seats) ===
Penybont No.5 1973
Party	Candidate	Votes	%	±%
Labour	M. Jones	4,647		
Labour	E. Davies	4,617		
Conservative	H. Eastment	1,190		
Turnout			54.4	
Labour win (new seat)				
Labour win (new seat)				

=== Penybont No.6 (two seats) ===
Penybont No.6 1973
Party	Candidate	Votes	%	±%
Labour	Philip Squire	2,724		
Independent	W. Barnett	2,102		
Labour	W. Bowcher	2,024		
Independent	G. Walters	1,528		
Turnout			63.7	
Labour win (new seat)				
Independent win (new seat)				

=== Penydarren (one seat) ===
Penydarren 1973
Party	Candidate	Votes	%	±%
Labour	T. Mahoney	1,540	56.0	
Plaid Cymru	B. Walters	777	28.3	
Ratepayers	G. Kiley	431	15.7	
Majority			27.8	
Turnout			58.4	
Labour win (new seat)				

=== Pontypridd No.1 (one seat) ===
Pontypridd No.1 1973
Party	Candidate	Votes	%	±%
Labour	W. Williams	Unopposed		
Labour win (new seat)				

=== Pontypridd No.2 Town (one seat) ===
Pontypridd No.2 Town 1973
Party	Candidate	Votes	%	±%
Labour	M. Came	895	58.7	
Plaid Cymru	A. Withey	631	41.3	
Majority			17.3	
Turnout			34.7	
Plaid Cymru win (new seat)				

=== Pontypridd No.3 (one seat) ===
Pontypridd No.3 1973
Party	Candidate	Votes	%	±%
Labour	E. Peck	Unopposed		
Labour win (new seat)				

=== Pontypridd No.4 Trallwn (one seat) ===
Pontypridd No.4 Trallwn 1973
Party	Candidate	Votes	%	±%
Liberal	Meriel Murphy	1,145	61.8	
Labour	R. Evans	708	38.2	
Majority			23.6	
Turnout			58.7	
Liberal win (new seat)				

=== Pontypridd No.5 Rhydyfelin (two seats) ===
Pontypridd No.5 Rhydyfelin 1973
Party	Candidate	Votes	%	±%
Labour	J. Davies	1,262		
Labour	W. Griffiths	870		
Independent Labour	E. Smith	736		
Turnout			41.5	
Labour win (new seat)				
Labour win (new seat)				

=== Pontypridd No.6 (one seat) ===
Pontypridd No.6 1973
Party	Candidate	Votes	%	±%
Labour	H. Weston	Unopposed		
Labour win (new seat)				

=== Porthcawl No.1 (one seat) ===
Porthcawl No.1 1973
Party	Candidate	Votes	%	±%
Conservative	Peter Hubbard-Miles	1,648		
Labour	W. Williams	1,114		
Majority			19.3	
Turnout			39.7	
Conservative win (new seat)				

=== Porthcawl No.2 (one seat) ===
Porthcawl No.2
Party	Candidate	Votes	%	±%
Labour	G. McBride	1,102	44.3	
Independent	M. Pope	734	32.1	
Independent	R. Fry	538	23.6	
Majority			12.2	
Turnout			44.8	
Labour win (new seat)				

=== Rhondda No.1 Treherbert (two seats) ===
Rhondda No.1 Treherbert 1973
Party	Candidate	Votes	%	±%
Labour	G. Williams	1,988		
Communist	Arthur True	1,865		
Labour	W. Llewellyn	1,616		
Communist	C. True	1,315		
Turnout			63.2	
Labour win (new seat)				
Communist win (new seat)				

=== Rhondda No.2 Treorchy (two seats) ===
Rhondda No.2 Treorchy 1973
Party	Candidate	Votes	%	±%
Labour	H. Jones	Unopposed		
Labour	G. Rees	Unopposed		
Labour win (new seat)				
Labour win (new seat)				

=== Rhondda No.3 Pentre (one seat) ===
Rhondda No.3 Pentre 1973
Party	Candidate	Votes	%	±%
Labour	E. Jenkins	Unopposed		
Labour win (new seat)				

=== Rhondda No.4 Ystrad (one seat) ===
Rhondda No.4 Ystrad
Party	Candidate	Votes	%	±%
Labour	D. Thomas	1,787	73.1	
Communist	A. Price	656	26.9	
Majority			46.3	
Turnout			49.1	
Labour win (new seat)				

=== Rhondda No.5 (one seat) ===
Rhondda No.5
Party	Candidate	Votes	%	±%
Labour	T. Parry	1,727	57.5	
Plaid Cymru	D. Morgan	1,279	42.5	
Majority			14.9	
Turnout			54.2	
Labour win (new seat)				

=== Rhondda No.6 (one seat) ===
Rhondda No.6
Party	Candidate	Votes	%	±%
Labour	C. Winter	2,012	62.5	
Conservative	P. Leyshon	1,208	37.5	
Majority			25.0	
Turnout			54.7	
Labour win (new seat)				

=== Rhondda No.7 Penygraig (one seat) ===
Rhondda No.7 Penygraig
Party	Candidate	Votes	%	±%
Labour	C. Richards	1,343	52.2	
Communist	Annie Powell	1,232	47.8	
Majority		111	4.3	
Turnout			46.7	
Labour win (new seat)				

=== Rhondda No.8 Porth (two seats) ===
Rhondda No.8 Porth 1973
Party	Candidate	Votes	%	±%
Labour	M. Ellis	2,252		
Labour	E. Westwood	2,098		
Ratepayers	D. Austin	1,903		
Turnout			51.1	
Labour win (new seat)				
Labour win (new seat)				

=== Rhondda No.9 (one seat) ===
Rhondda No.9 1973
Party	Candidate	Votes	%	±%
Labour	S. McElstrim	Unopposed		
Labour win (new seat)				

=== Rhymney Lower, Middle and Upper (one seat) ===
Rhymney Lower, Middle and Upper 1973
Party	Candidate	Votes	%	±%
Labour	J. Williams	Unopposed		
Labour win (new seat)				

=== Treharris (one seat) ===
Treharris 1973
Party	Candidate	Votes	%	±%
Labour	T. Richards	Unopposed		
Labour win (new seat)				

=== Vaynor and Penderyn No.1 (one seat) ===
Vaynor and Penderyn No.1
Party	Candidate	Votes	%	±%
Labour	M. Byrne	1,042	60.2	
Independent	A. Williams	690	39.8	
Majority			20.3	
Turnout			57.2	
Labour win (new seat)				

=== Vaynor and Penderyn No.2 (one seat) ===
Vaynor and Penderyn No.2
Party	Candidate	Votes	%	±%
Labour	C. Davies	1,348	90.6	
Communist	G. Thomas	140	9.4	
Majority			81.2	
Turnout			56.1	
Labour win (new seat)				
