= Bethan Sayed =

Plaid Cymru politician

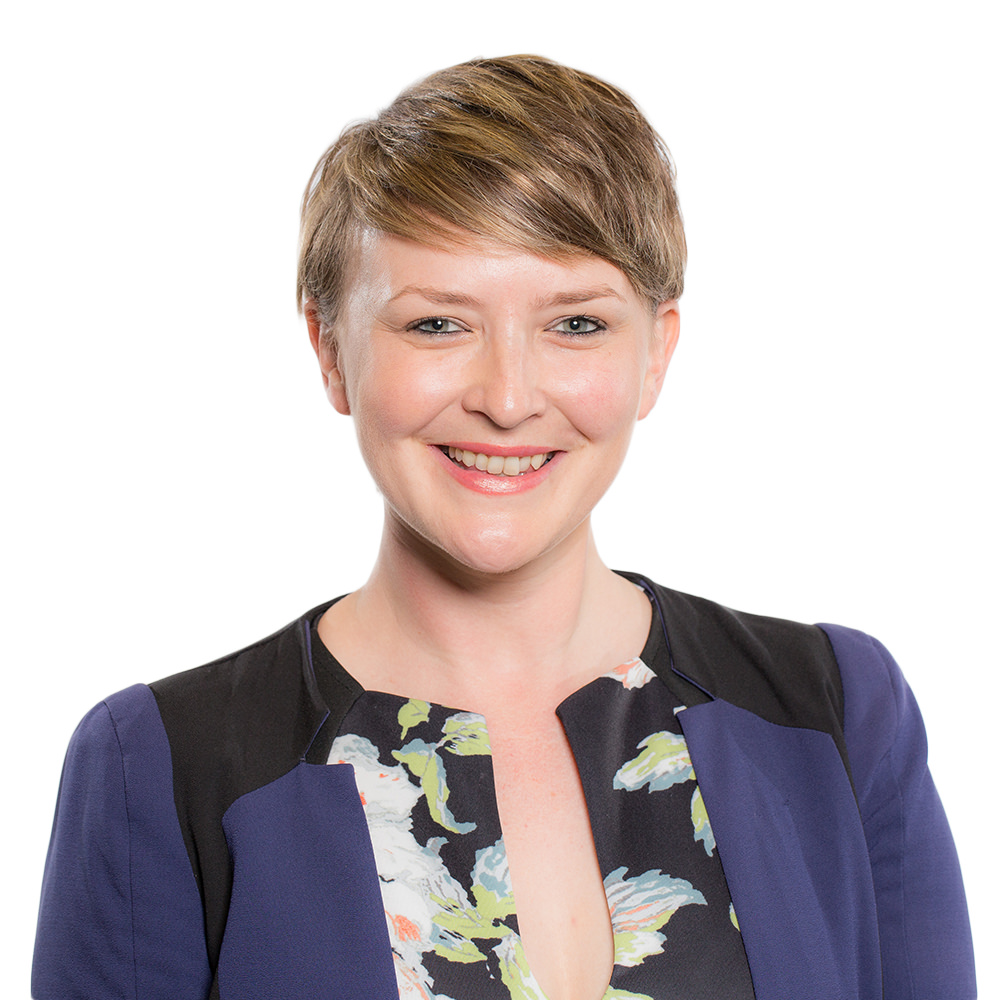
- Jenkins in 2016

Member of the Senedd for South Wales West
- In office 3 May 2007 – 29 April 2021
- Preceded by: Janet Davies

Personal details
- Born: 9 December 1981 (age 44) Aberdare, Wales
- Party: Plaid Cymru
- Education: Aberystwyth University

Bethan Sayed (née Jenkins, born 9 December 1981) is a Welsh former politician. She represented the South Wales West region for Plaid Cymru as a Member of the Senedd from 2007 to 2021.

== Early life and education ==
Sayed was born in Aberdare, the daughter of poet Mike Jenkins. She grew up in Merthyr Tydfil, where both her parents were involved in the anti-apartheid movement of the 1980s and early 1990s. Her brother is the Channel 4 News reporter Ciaran Jenkins.

She was educated at Ysgol Gyfun Rhydfelen, near Pontypridd. She graduated with a BScEcon degree in International Politics and International History at the University of Wales, Aberystwyth in 2005. Through student politics, she was elected to the Aberystwyth Guild of Students executive, and was serving as Guild President by 2004. With the organisation Cymru X she has served as a national organiser of the party's youth wing.

== Senedd ==
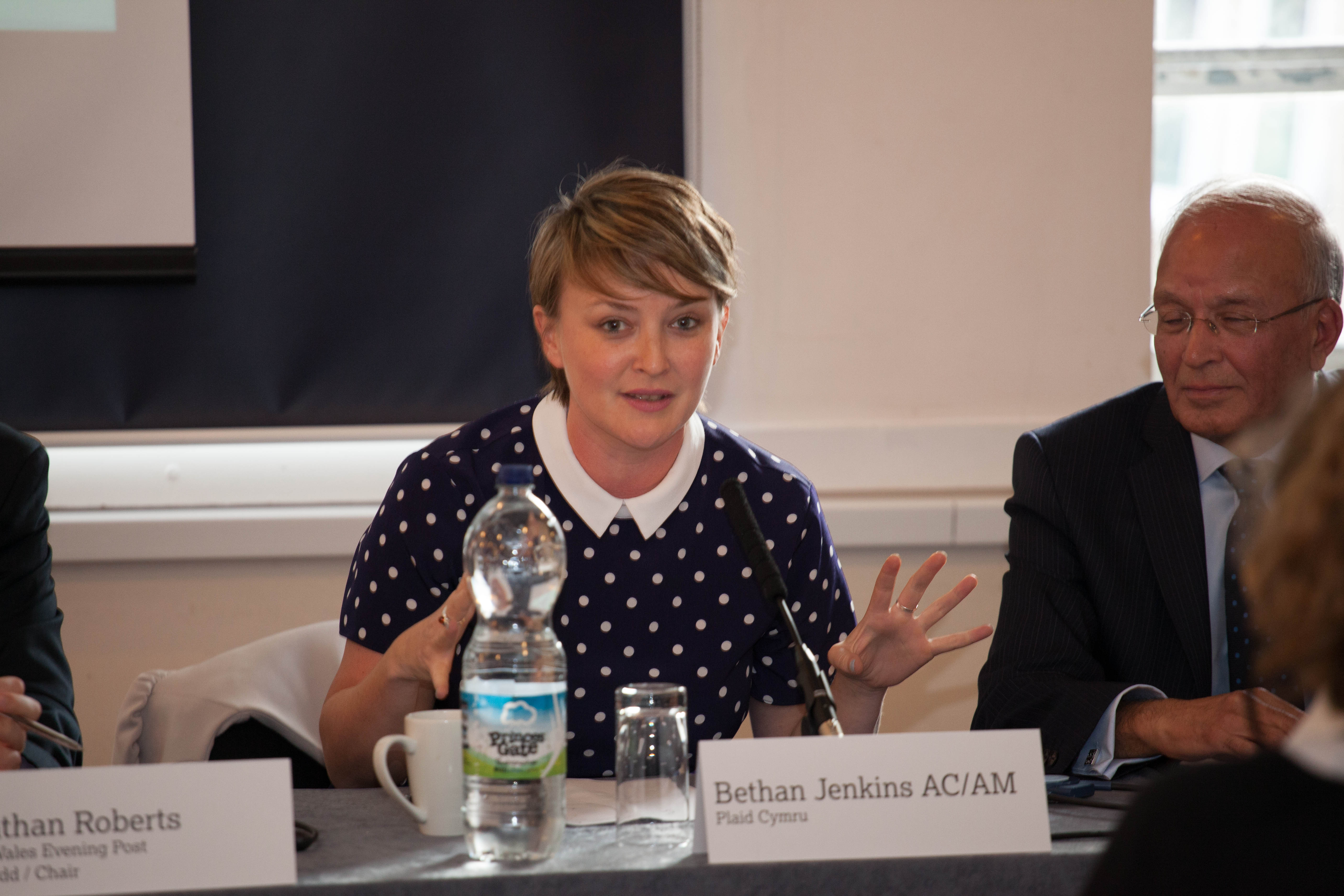
Jenkins in 2015

In 2006, Jenkins was selected as Plaid Cymru's lead candidate for the South West Wales Regional list and was duly elected in the subsequent elections of May 2007. Jenkins was initially Plaid Cymru's Child Poverty and Culture Spokesperson for the Plaid Cymru group at the National Assembly, and sat on the Communities and Culture committee, Audit committee, and the Petitions Committee.

During her first year as an AM (a member of the then Welsh Assembly), she claimed over £10,000 in expenses, including spending £750 per month on a second home in Cardiff after claiming it would not be possible for her to do her job without the second home. Assembly Members (AMs) representing South Wales were later barred from claiming a second home allowance, but were permitted to claim up to 20 nights in Cardiff hotels provided they were working the next morning. In 2013, Jenkins was criticised for claiming a nights stay in a Cardiff hotel after attending a Rihanna concert. Jenkins later repaid the money claimed.

In March 2012, Jenkins was appointed Plaid's spokesperson for Heritage, Welsh language and Sport. She was chairperson for the Assembly's Cross Party Eating Disorder Group, and formed a new cross party group on human rights. Jenkins has been an outspoken republican. Alongside her Plaid Cymru colleague, Leanne Wood, she is a member of the group Republic. In 2022, she opposed the accession of Charles III as King of the United Kingdom and Prince William taking the title "Prince of Wales" (see Opposition to the Prince of Wales title).

In June 2012, Jenkins called Martin McGuinness, the then Deputy First Minister of Northern Ireland, "naive" in light of him meeting Queen Elizabeth II at a charity reception. After Welsh Labour members highlighted the comments, Jenkins said that she was appalled at being accused of "trying to destabilise" the Northern Irish peace process, and that she was giving up Twitter for the time being.

Early in the hours of 14 October 2012, Jenkins was arrested by South Wales Police in Llandaff, Cardiff, for driving erratically. When tested for alcohol, she was more than twice the legal limit. She was released on bail by police pending further enquiries. Jenkins issued a statement, stating that there were "no excuses" for what she had done, and that she had resigned her position as Plaid's spokeswoman on heritage, the Welsh language and sport. Her statement also stated that she had been receiving professional medical help for depression. On Monday, 15 October 2012, Jenkins was suspended from the Plaid group of AMs "while the process of justice takes its course". On 12 November 2012, Jenkins was charged with drink driving, and on 19 December was banned from driving for 20 months.

In August 2020, Sayed announced she would not be standing in the 2021 Senedd election.

In 2023, in the wake of a damning report that found "a culture of sexual harassment, bullying and discrimination" within Plaid Cymru, Sayed (as Jenkins had become known) said that party leader Adam Price had known about those issues for years.

== Personal life ==
In February 2018, she married Rahil Sayed, who is originally from Mumbai and works in Bollywood. Bethan also announced she would be changing her surname to Sayed for both personal and professional purposes. They have a son, Idris. In 2018, she said she was experiencing racism because of her marriage to Rahil, a practicing Muslim from India.

Sayed has called for the abolition of the Crown Estates:

"The Crown Estate owns significant chunks of the Welsh coastline, yet the decisions about how to manage and develop these areas are made by people in another country who have no connection to the people or the land," she said. "That is why we are calling for the Crown Estate to be taken into democratic public ownership. We could choose to use the land for creating new green jobs or investing in renewable energy. Taking this action on the birthday of the King is symbolic – we are saying no more – give us back our land. We hope people from across Wales will take part where Crown Estate land exists nearby – because it most certainly will stretch the length of Wales unfortunately."

== Office held ==
Senedd
Preceded by Janet Davies	Member of the Senedd for South Wales West; 2007–2021	Incumbent
Preceded by Laura Anne Jones	Baby of the House; 2007–2016	Succeeded by Steffan Lewis
Incumbent
Political offices
Preceded by TBD	Shadow Minister for Housing, Poverty, Communities & Steel; 2016–2021	Incumbent
