= Mid Glamorgan County Council =

Welsh local governing body (1974–1996)

Mid Glamorgan County Council Cyngor Sir Morgannwg Ganol
- Coat of arms of Mid Glamorgan County Council

Type
- Type: County council

History
- Founded: 1 April 1974
- Disbanded: 31 March 1996
- Preceded by: Glamorgan County Council (part); Merthyr Tydfil CBC (1908-1974)
- Succeeded by: Bridgend County Borough Council; Caerphilly County Borough Council (part); Merthyr Tydfil County Borough Council; Rhondda Cynon Taf County Borough Council

Structure
- Seats: 85 councillors (1974–1989); 74 councillors (1989–1995)
- Length of term: 4 years

Elections
- Voting system: First past the post
- First election: April 1973
- Last election: May 1993

Meeting place
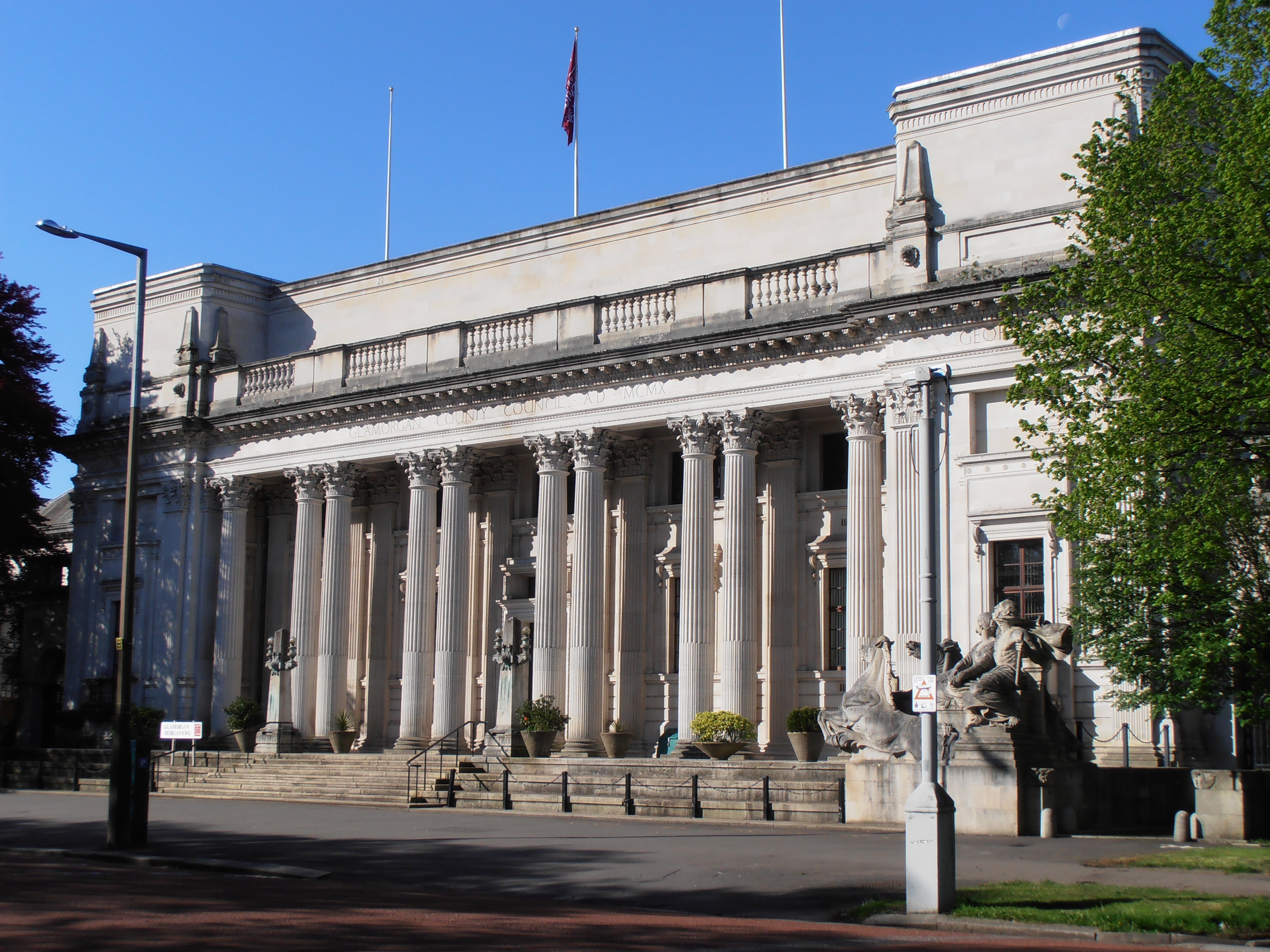
- County Hall, Cathays Park, Cardiff

Mid Glamorgan County Council (Welsh: Cyngor Sir Morgannwg Ganol) was the upper-tier authority for the Welsh county of Mid Glamorgan between its creation in 1974 and its abolition in 1996.

== History ==
Local government in England and Wales was reorganised in 1974 under the Local Government Act 1972. The old administrative county of Glamorgan was subdivided, forming Mid Glamorgan, South Glamorgan and West Glamorgan, which all came into existence on 1 April 1974.

Mid Glamorgan was the largest and the poorest of the new county councils in Glamorgan. In 1974 it had a population of 531,847 and the council had a revenue expenditure of £60 million.

Mid Glamorgan County Council was abolished in 1996 under the Local Government (Wales) Act 1994, with the districts in the area being reorganised to become unitary authorities taking over the functions previously performed by the county council.

== Political control ==
The first election to the county council was held in 1973, initially operating as a shadow authority alongside the outgoing authorities until it came into its powers on 1 April 1974. Labour held a majority of the seats on the council throughout its existence.

Party in control	Years
Labour	1974–1996

=== Leadership ===
The leaders of the council were:

Councillor	Party	From	To
Philip Squire	Labour	1 Apr 1974	May 1989
Terry Mahoney	Labour	May 1989	31 Mar 1996

Philip Squire was appointed chairman and leader from the establishment of the shadow authority. He had previously been a member of Glamorgan County Council since 1946. The chief executive was solicitor, Tom Vivian Walters, who had worked for Glamorgan County Council since 1943.

Squire continued as leader of the council for 15 years, until retiring in 1989 at the age of 83. Because of the dominance of the Labour Party on the council, it was sometimes referred to as a "Squirearchy".

== Elections ==
The first Mid Glamorgan Council elections took place in April 1973, when 85 councillors were elected from 68 electoral divisions (with 16 councillors in 14 divisions being elected unopposed). The number of councillors was reduced to 74 in 1989. The results of each election were as follows:

Year	Seats	Labour	Plaid Cymru	Conservative	Liberal Democrats (Note: Includes Liberals and SDP pre-1988)	Communist	Independent	Others	Notes
1973	85	62	9	3	2	2	3	3	
1977	85	48	17	8	2	1	5	4	
1981	85	63	9	3	2	1	4	3	
1985	85	68	7	1	2	1	4	2	
1989	74	65	5	-	1	-	2	1	New division boundaries.
1993	74	60	10	1	-	-	3	-	

== Premises ==
County Hall (now the Glamorgan Building) in Cathays Park, Cardiff had been the headquarters for Glamorgan County Council prior to 1974 and, although Cardiff was in South Glamorgan, not Mid Glamorgan, it was decided to use the Glamorgan Building as the new headquarters for Mid Glamorgan County Council.

== See also ==
- List of electoral wards in Mid Glamorgan
