= Jeff Jones (Welsh politician) =

British politician

Jeff Jones is a retired Labour Party politician from the town of Maesteg, Wales who rose to become Council Leader of Bridgend County Borough Council. He is known throughout South Wales as an outspoken local politician.

Jones was brought up, the son of a miner and steelworker, in Maesteg. He studied political history at the London School of Economics.

Jones was a councillor in Maesteg on the Mid Glamorgan County Council from 1981, initially for the Maesteg No. 2 ward, which became Maesteg East. From 1995 he became one of the two councillors for the Bridgend County Borough Council ward of Maesteg East. He retired from politics in 2004 before the Labour administration – which had held power since 1996 – was defeated by a coalition in the June 2004 council elections.

After writing a letter to Wales First Minister Rhodri Morgan citing concerns about the 2004 Clywch inquiry (into allegations of sexual abuse), there was an unsuccessful attempt to prosecute Jones for contempt. Jones says it was an attempt to silence him. Though found not to be in contempt, he had to pay £10,000 legal costs. In March 2006 Jones was cleared of claims he had breached the council's code of conduct, after a grievance had been brought against him by a council employee about comments made on a television programme in 2003. Jones' comments were described by the local government ombudsman as "somewhat hostile" but not "abusive".

His attempt to become a governor in 2008 of Maesteg Comprehensive School was thwarted by the county council.

Jones has subsequently set himself up as a local government consultant.
