= Philip Squire =

Welsh Labour politician (1905–1996)

Philip Squire CBE (1905–1996) was a local Labour Party politician who was a county councillor for over 40 years and leader of Mid Glamorgan County Council, Wales, for 15 years. He was described as "one of the most influential figures in Welsh local government".

== Background ==
Squire was born on 22 May 1905 in Bridgend, Glamorgan. He started working for his family's haulage business as a teenager. He initially joined the Independent Labour Party, but transferred to the Labour Party in 1930. He married Doris May in 1931. He lived in Tondu.

== Politics and public service ==
Squire was elected to Ynysawdre Parish Council in 1934. He was subsequently elected as a county councillor to Glamorgan County Council in 1946. He became an alderman in the mid-1950s, serving for 19 years until the dissolution of the County Council in 1974.

Squire also became chair of Penybont Rural District Council and was an officer of the Bridgend branch of the National Farmers Union.

On the dissolution of Glamorgan County Council and creation of the authorities of Mid, South and West Glamorgan in 1974, Squire became chairman and leader of Mid Glamorgan County Council. Mid Glamorgan was the largest of the three new counties with a population of more than 530,000 stretching from the rural South Wales coast to the old industrial coal mining areas of the South Wales Valleys. The new authority was dominated by the Labour Party and was sometimes described as a "Squirearchy".

Squire continued to lead Mid Glamorgan Council for 15 years until retiring at the age of 83. Squire is credited with working hard to get the best deal for what was one of Britain's poorest counties. He also offered free meals to the children of striking coalminers during the 1984-1985 United Kingdom miners' strike and opposed South Africa's apartheid regime, threatening to withdraw council facilities for visiting rugby teams.

He had been appointed an Officer of the Order of the British Empire (OBE) in the 1969 Birthday Honours and promoted to a Commander (CBE) in the 1978 Birthday Honours for services to local government in Mid-Glamorgan.

Squire died aged 90 on 4 February 1996.
