= Janet Davies (politician) =

Welsh politician

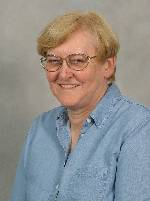

Member of the Welsh Assembly for South Wales West
- In office 6 May 1999 – 3 May 2007
- Preceded by: New Assembly
- Succeeded by: Bethan Jenkins

Personal details
- Born: 29 May 1939 (age 87) Cardiff, Wales
- Party: Plaid Cymru
- Education: Open University

Janet Marion Davies (born 29 May 1939) is a Welsh Plaid Cymru politician. She was the National Assembly for Wales Member for South Wales West from 1999 to 2007, retiring at the 2007 election.

== Background ==
Davies was educated at Howell's School Llandaff, Cardiff and Trinity College, Carmarthen (BA Hons), the University of Wales and the Open University (BA Hons). Davies was a Nurse and Midwife in the 1960s.

== Political career ==
In 1976, Davies ran to represent the Llanharry and Llaniltud ward on Taff Ely Borough Council, but was not elected. In 1983, she again contested the ward, and this time was elected. In 1986, she was re-elected to represent the reformed Llanharry ward. She was selected as leader of the Council in 1991, and remained in the role until the council was abolished in 1996, and incorporated into Rhondda Cynon Taf County Borough Council. She also served as Mayor of Taff-Ely Borough from 1995 to 1996. Davies was a witness to the Nolan Committee in its inquiry into local government in 1996.

Davies contested the Pontypridd constituency for Plaid Cymru in the 1983 General Election, finishing fourth of five candidates with 4.7% of the vote. She then stood in the 1985 Brecon and Radnor by-election, finishing fourth out of seven with 1.1% of the vote, and in Merthyr Tydfil and Rhymney in the 1987 General Election, finishing last with 4.7% of the vote. Davies later criticised the party's campaign in the 1987 election, arguing it was too focused on Welsh-speaking areas in Wales. In 1986 she stood to be Chair of Plaid Cymru on a left-wing ticket, and lost to Dafydd Huws.

Davies was elected at the inaugural 1999 Welsh Assembly Elections for South Wales West.

Davies has served as Director of elections and a member of the Plaid Cymru National Executive. She was Chief Whip for the Plaid Group in the National Assembly.

In the Second Assembly (2003–07) Davies was a member of the following committees: Audit Committee (Chair); Scrutiny of the First Minister Committee; Public Audit Act Commencement Order Committee 2005; Public Audit (Wales) Bill Committee 2003; and the Public Audit (Wales) Bill Committee 2004.

== Offices held ==
Senedd
Preceded by (new post)	Assembly Member for South Wales West; 1999 – 2007	Succeeded by Bethan Jenkins
