= Bettws, Bridgend =

Coordinates: 51.569°N 03.589°W

Bettws: Welsh: Betws
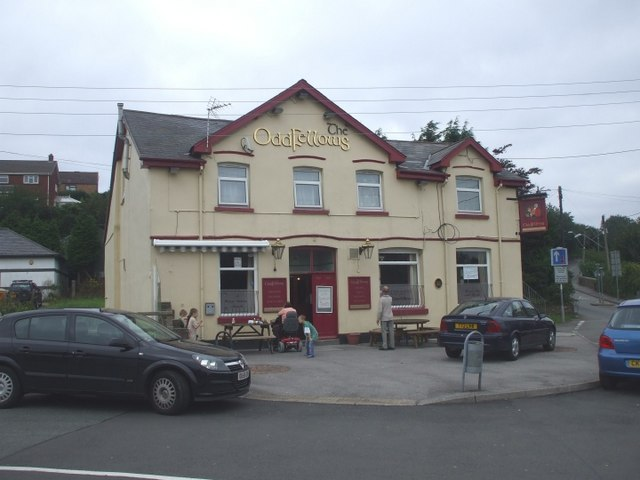

- Location within Bridgend
- Population: 2,253 (2011)
- OS grid reference: SS899867
- Community: Garw Valley
- Principal area: Bridgend
- Preserved county: Mid Glamorgan
- Country: Wales
- Sovereign state: United Kingdom
- Post town: BRIDGEND
- Postcode district: CF32
- Dialling code: 01656
- Police: South Wales
- Fire: South Wales
- Ambulance: Welsh
- UK Parliament: Rhondda and Ogmore
- Senedd Cymru – Welsh Parliament: Bridgend

Bettws /ˈbɛtus/, (Welsh: Betws) is a small ex-mining and farming village in the South Wales Valleys in the county borough of Bridgend, Wales.

Bryngarw Country Park is approximately one mile away, with a footpath leading there from the village. The village is around 3 miles away from Junction 36 on the M4 Motorway, and is located to the west of Llangeinor and to the north of Brynmenyn.

== Geography ==
Bettws is located in the central part of Bridgend County Borough in South Wales. It is located 4.7 miles (7.6 km) north of the town of Bridgend and lies on the west side of the main A4064 road. It is on the River Ogmore, and the Llynfi and Garw rivulets border the village on each side. The nearest communities to Bettws are Llangeinor to the north-east, and Llangynwyd to the west.

The population of Bettws is around 2,400 according to The Betws LIFE Centre.

== Etymology ==
The name of the village comes from the Middle English word bedhus, meaning "prayer house", which became betws in Welsh.

== Governance ==
At the United Kingdom level, Bettws is in the parliamentary constituency of Rhondda and Ogmore.

In the Senedd, Bettws is in the constituency of Bridgend.

For European elections Bettws was in the Wales constituency prior to 2020.

At the county level, Bettws was from 1995 until 2022 an electoral ward for Bridgend County Borough Council, electing one county councillor. Since 2022 Bettws has formed part of the three-member Garw Valley ward.

At the Community Council level Bettws is administered by Garw Valley Community Council.

== Demography ==
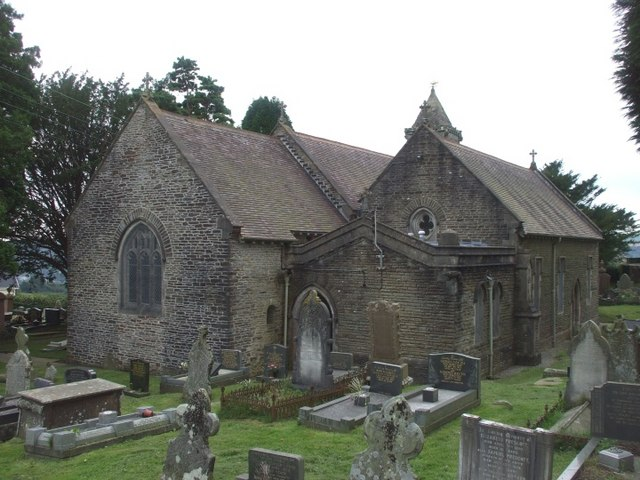
Bettws Parish Church

In the 2011 census Bettws village had 910 dwellings, 884 households and a population of 2,253 (1,093 males and 1,157 females). The average age of residents was 36 years. Of those aged between 16 and 74, 48.4% had no academic qualifications or only one GCSE. According to the census, 707 people said they were economically inactive, but 117 of those were unemployed. Christianity was the majority religion in the village, with 978 individuals. There were 1061 recorded as having no religion and 195 whose religion was not stated.

== Sport ==
Bettws F.C. are based in the village. The club also run numerous youth teams, including the successful under 19s.

== Schools ==
Almost all children aged 3–11 attend Betws Primary School. When pupils complete Key Stage Two, 91% of students attend Coleg Cymunedol Y Dderwen (formerly Ynysawdre Comprehensive School and Ogmore School), with a minority attending Ysgol Gyfun Gymraeg Llangynwyd (they formerly transferred to Ysgol Gyfun Llanhari) or Brynteg Comprehensive School. Many special needs pupils go on to attend Ysgol Bryn Castell.

== Leisure ==
Betws Eco Lodge is situated in the heart of the village. It caters for groups and individuals in a bunkhouse style. The project is run by The Youth of Bettws, a local charity for people between the ages of 7 and 25. Bryngarw Country Park lies to the south.

== Notable people ==
Griffith J. Griffith, philanthropist, was born in the village.
