= Garw Valley =

Coordinates: 51.60°N 3.58°W

Garw Valley: Welsh: Cwm Garw
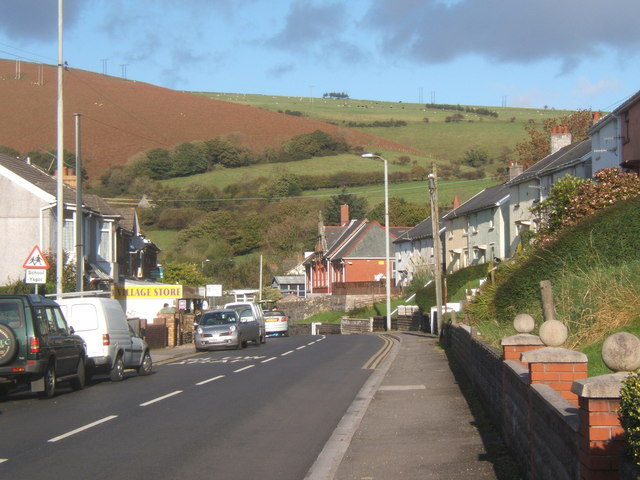
- A4064 road running through Llangeinor
- Population: 7,784 (2011)
- Principal area: Bridgend County Borough
- Preserved county: Mid Glamorgan
- Country: Wales
- Sovereign state: United Kingdom
- Post town: BRIDGEND
- Postcode district: CF32
- Dialling code: 01656
- Ambulance: Welsh
- UK Parliament: Rhondda and Ogmore
- Senedd Cymru – Welsh Parliament: Ogmore
- List of places UK Wales Map of the community

Garw Valley (Welsh: Cwm Garw) is a community and coterminous electoral ward in the north of Bridgend County Borough, South Wales. As the name suggests, it follows and encompasses the valley of the River Garw. The community includes the village of Blaengarw at the head of the valley, followed by Pontycymer and Llangeinor on the river, with Bettws between the Garw and the Llynfi in the south. Garw Valley is bordered to the west by Maesteg, Llangynwyd Middle and Llangynwyd Lower; to the east by Ogmore Valley and to the south by Ynysawdre and St Bride's Minor.

Attractions include the Garw Valley Railway, a four and half mile steam railway, which volunteers began re-laying in 2016. Regular passenger rail services had previously ceased in the valley in 1953, though occasional "enthusiasts' trains" used the line in 1996 and 1997.

== Governance ==
At the local level, Garw Valley elects 13 community councillors to Garw Valley Community Council, from the four wards of Bettws, Llangeinor, Pontycymmer and Blaengarw.

At the county level, until 2022 the community was covered by four electoral wards, of Blaengarw, Pontycymmer, Llangeinor and Bettws, each electing one county councillor to Bridgend County Borough Council. Following a boundary review, the four wards were combined to form a new Garw Valley ward, electing three county borough councillors.
