= Garw =

Garw is a Welsh toponym meaning "rugged" and may refer to:

- River Garw, a river in South Wales
- Garw Valley, the community along the river valley
- Nantgarw, a village in Rhondda Cynon Taff
- Garw S.B.G.C., a football club based in the Garw Valley
