= Brynmenyn railway station =

Disused railway station in Brynmenyn, Bridgend County Borough

Brynmenyn
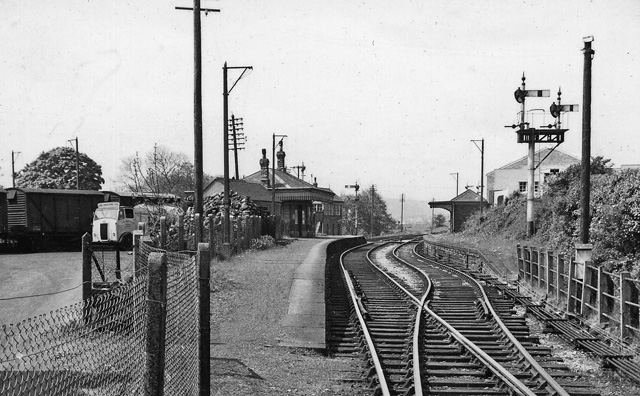
- The site of the station, looking southwest towards Tondu, in 1962

General information
- Location: Brynmenyn, Glamorgan; Wales
- Coordinates: 51.5505°N 3.5807°W
- Grid reference: SS905847
- Platforms: 3

Other information
- Status: Disused

History
- Original company: Llynvi and Ogmore Railway
- Pre-grouping: Great Western Railway
- Post-grouping: Great Western Railway

Key dates
- 12 May 1873: Opened as Brynmenin
- 1886: Name changed to Brynmenin
- 5 May 1958: Closed
Location

Brynmenyn railway station served the village of Brynmenyn, in the historic county of Glamorgan, Wales, from 1873 to 1958 on the Garw Valley Railway.

== History ==
The station was opened as Brynmenin on 12 May 1873 by the Llynvi and Ogmore Railway. Its name was changed to Brynmenyn in 1886, although the old spelling remained in the handbook of stations until 1890. The station closed on 5 May 1958.

| Preceding station | Disused railways | Following station |
|---|---|---|
| Llangeinor; Line and station closed | Llynvi and Ogmore Railway; Garw Valley Railway | Tondu; Line closed, station open |
| Blackmill; Line and station closed | Llynvi and Ogmore Railway; Ogmore Valley Railway | Terminus |
