= Abergarw =

Coordinates: 51.550989°N 3.574847°W

Abergarw is a village in Bridgend county. It lies at the confluence of the River Garw (Rough River) and River Ogwr river valleys, about 4 miles (6.4 km) to the north of the town of Bridgend itself, between the villages of Brynmenyn and Bryncethin.
