= Bryngarw Country Park =

Park in Bridgend County Borough, Wales

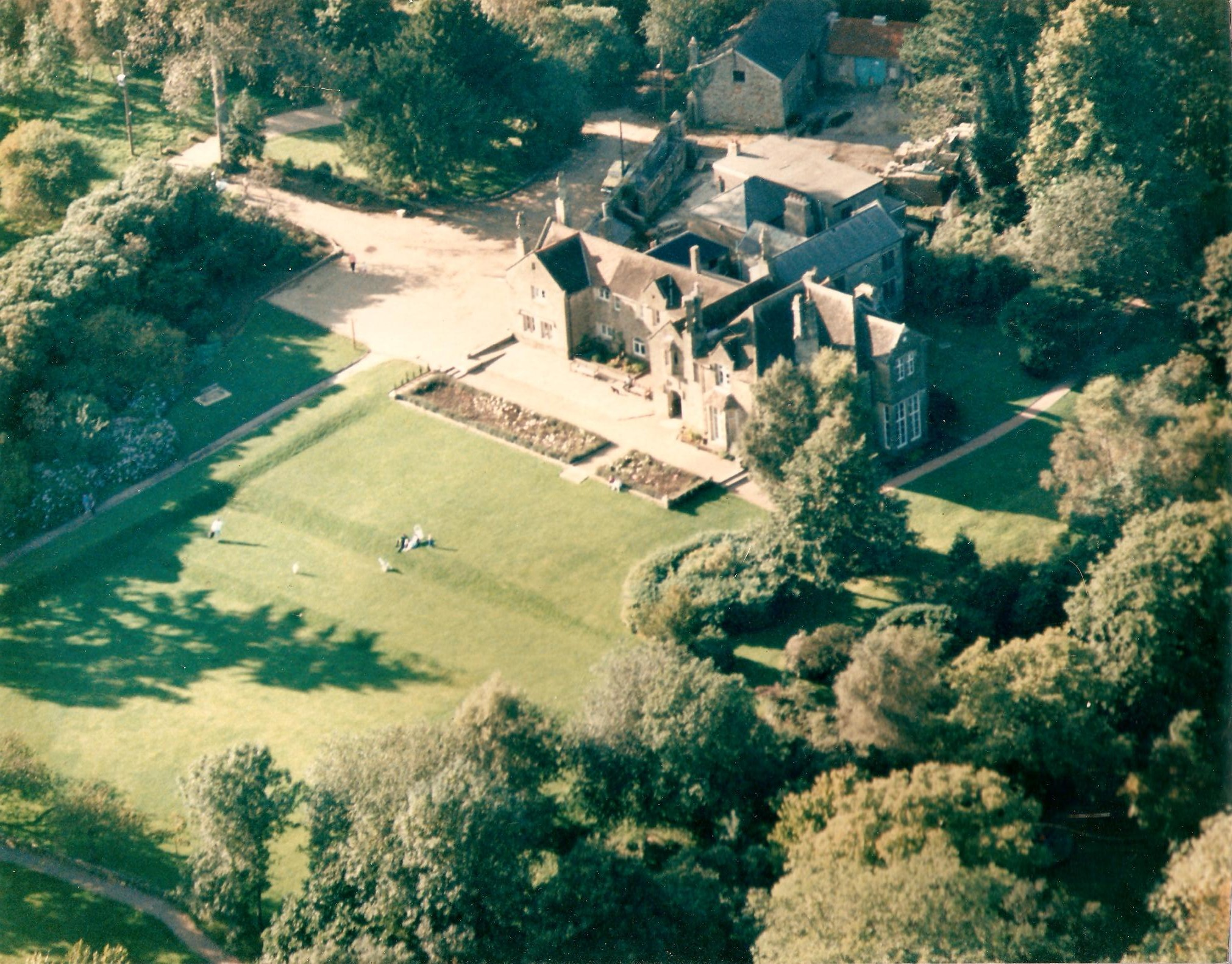
- Aerial view of Bryngarw House and Lawn 1986/87

- Location within Wales
- Type: Park
- Location: Bridgend County Borough, Wales
- Coordinates: 51.554339°N 3.580244°W
- Area: 48 hectares (120 acres)

Bryngarw Country Park is made up of 48 hectares (120 acres) and is situated on the west bank of the Afon Garw, at the mouth of the Garw Valley in the Bridgend County Borough, Wales.

The western boundary is marked by the Brynmenyn-Bettws road and the River Graw is its eastern boundary. 18 hectares of open meadowlands, subjects of grazing tenancy agreements and hence not open to the public, surrounds the Country Park. The Country Park and Bryngarw House occupies the remaining 30 hectares of the estate. Bryngarw House and its associated formal gardens (including the lawn, shrubbery, lake and oriental gardens) account for 1.5 hectares of the park. The rest of the park is predominantly wooded (broadleaf, coniferous and mixed woodland) with areas of meadow, wetland and freshwater, formal garden and areas for amenity use.

Bryngarw Park is a Grade II listed park and garden on the Cadw/ICOMOS Register of Parks and Gardens of Special Historic Interest in Wales. The house and gardens lie within the Strategic Coalfield Plateau, Landscape Conservation Area, described in local legislation (Ogre Borough Local Plan and emerging Urban Development Plan). This designation refers to the wooded, gently sloping agricultural and parkland landscape that characterizes the park. In 2010, the park was designated as a Key Strategic Site under the Valleys Partnership Initiative Action Program and is subsequently receiving funding from the Wales Assembly Government (WAG) Environmental Improvement Grant and Bridgend County Borough Council's Strategic Regeneration Fund. The park has also been awarded grant money from ‘One Historic Garden’ Centre of Excellence Scheme and has been designated one of eight ‘Visit Wales Sustainable Tourism, Historic Gardens Centre of Excellence’ sites. This money from both funds will be used in autumn of 2011 to update and expand the existing visitor canter, refurbish the café and toilets, improve the existing car park and to significantly enhance the oriental gardens.

In 2010, the park won its first Green Flag Award for its "excellent use of green space, well-maintained facilities and high standard of safety and security". By 2023 the park had received the award for the eighth time.

== History of the estate ==
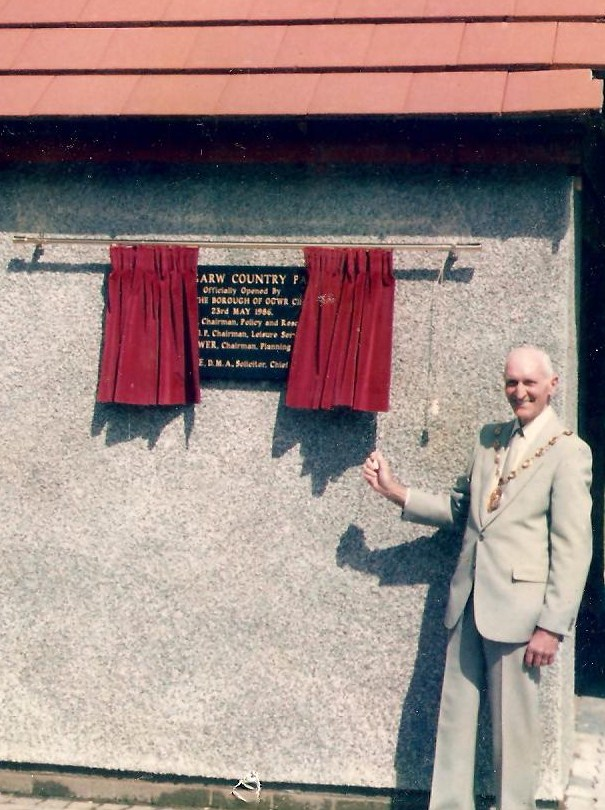
Opening ceremony 23 May 1986 with Cllr. W.H. Burt, Major of the Borough of Ogwr 1986

Bryngarw House is thought to have been built in the 15th century and used as a farmhouse; although there is no documentation there is some architectural evidence to support this theory. The first recorded date of the existence of the house is in 1743. In 1775 John Popkin gave the house and its grounds to his sister Frances as a wedding present when she married into the Traherne family; the building appears to have been extensively modified during their residence. The last member of the Traherne family to occupy the house was Captain Onslow Powell Traherne, a well travelled Victorian industrialist, who apparently renovated and extended the house and laid out the existing formal gardens between 1910 and 1920, introducing many exotic species (including many species of rhododendron, magnolia, tulip tree, handkerchief trees, sugar maple, paperbark dogwood, sequoia and ginkgo biloba). Towards the end of his residence Captain Traherne experienced money troubles and sold the estate to a local business man R.S.Hayes in the late 1940s. He and his family then occupied the house until his death in 1959 when it was again sold.

In 1961, the house fell into public ownership and was divided into nine flats used as council accommodation. Thirty-two residential caravans were later installed in the former kitchen garden area (now used as the park's car park). These accommodations were used until 1980 when Bryngarw was designated a future Country Park. Starting in 1982, a Manpower Services Commission team carried out construction and reclamation work throughout the site over a five-year period. This work included; installation of a network of paths and other access infrastructure around the park, the recovery of the lake and formal gardens (after 25 years of neglect), installation of a permanent car park and construction of public amenities (toilets, café and visitor centre).

Bryngarw Country Park was then officially opened May 23, 1986.

In 1980, the house had been abandoned due to dry and wet rot rendering it in a poor state of repair. Its dilapidation continued until 1987 when work partially restored the building and created a self-contained flat to accommodate the Assistant Ranger of the Country Park. However, thanks to European funding, gained in 1993, the house was renovated to its present condition.

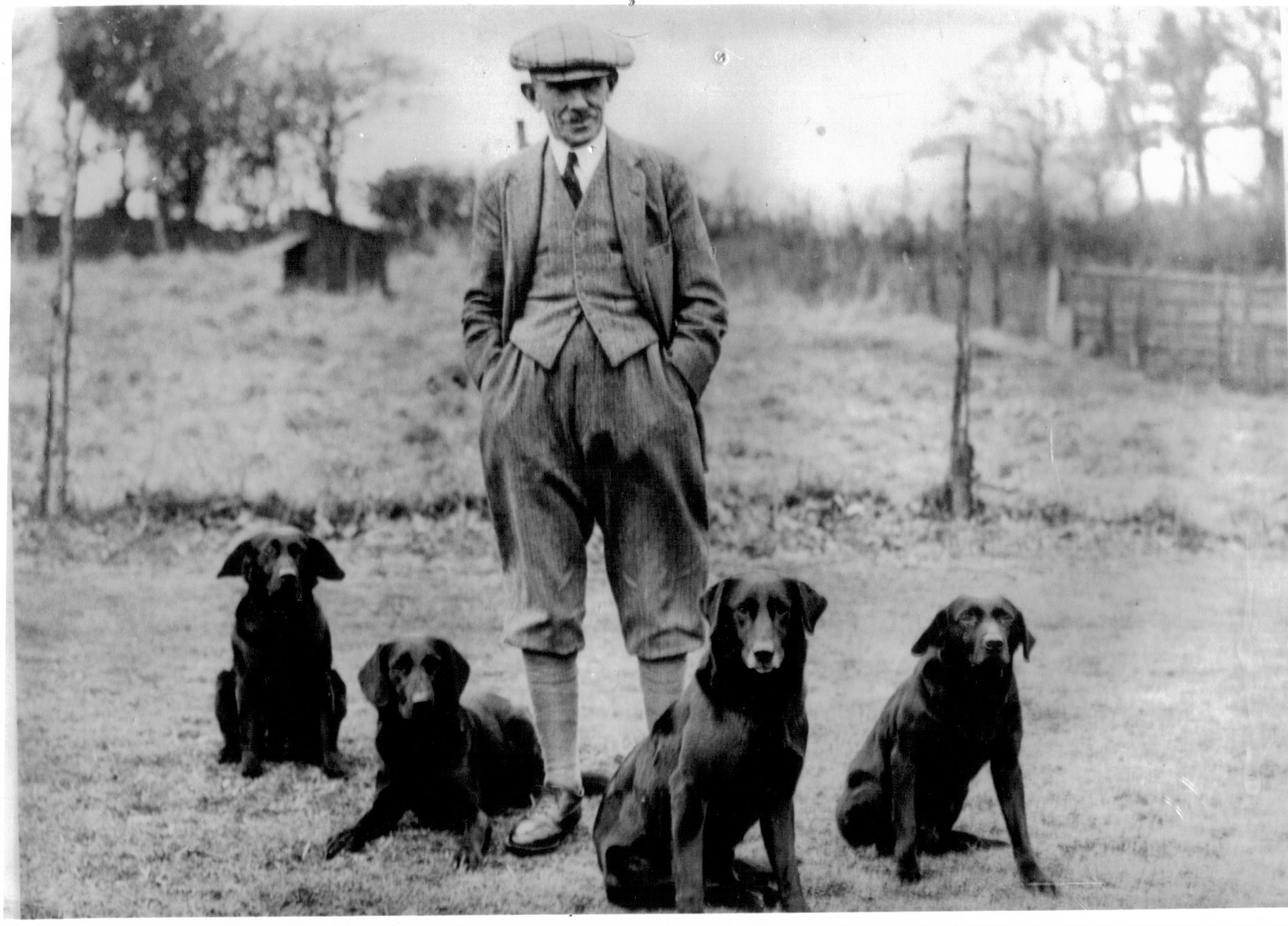
Captain Onslow Powell Traherne

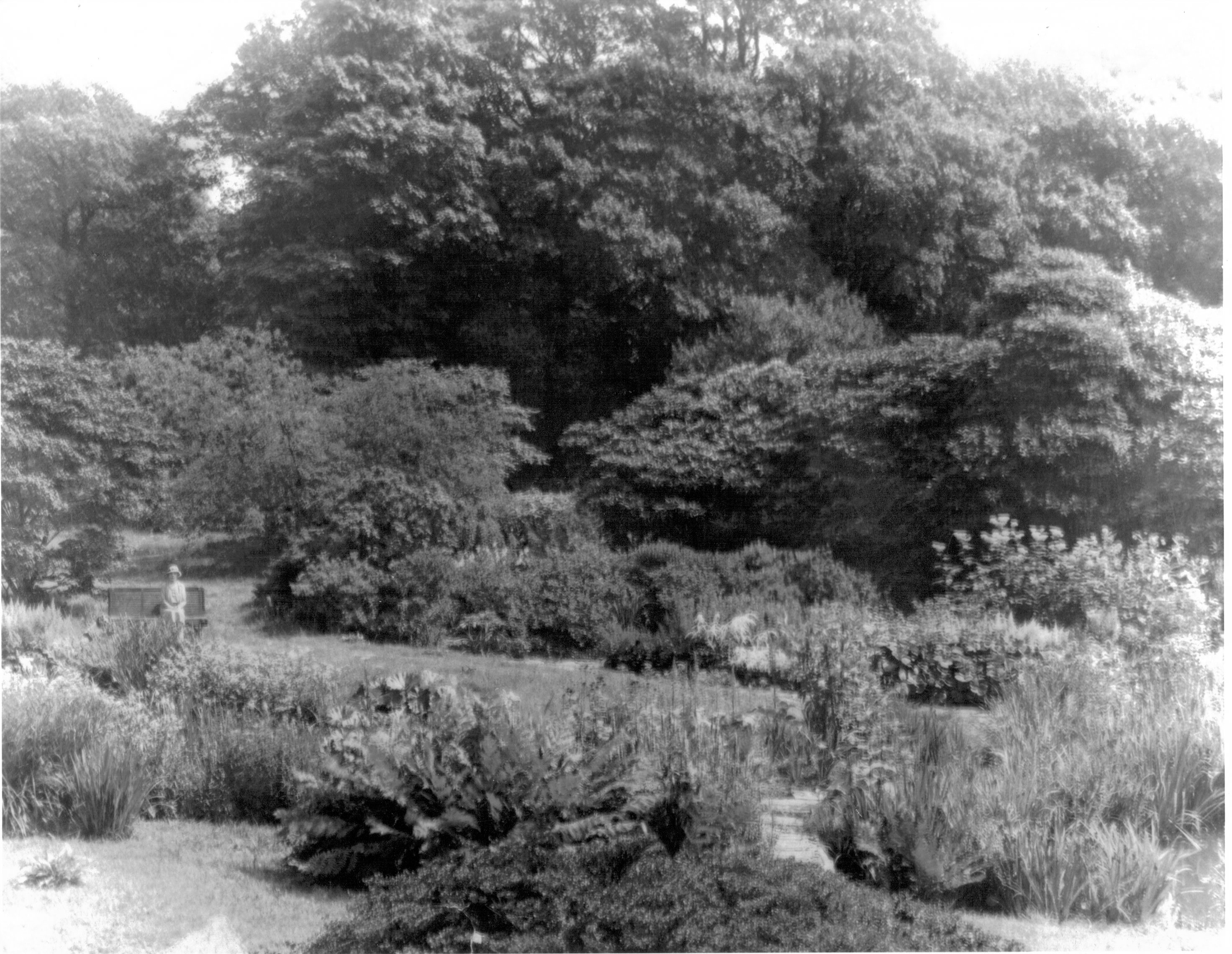
Oriental Garden circa 1940

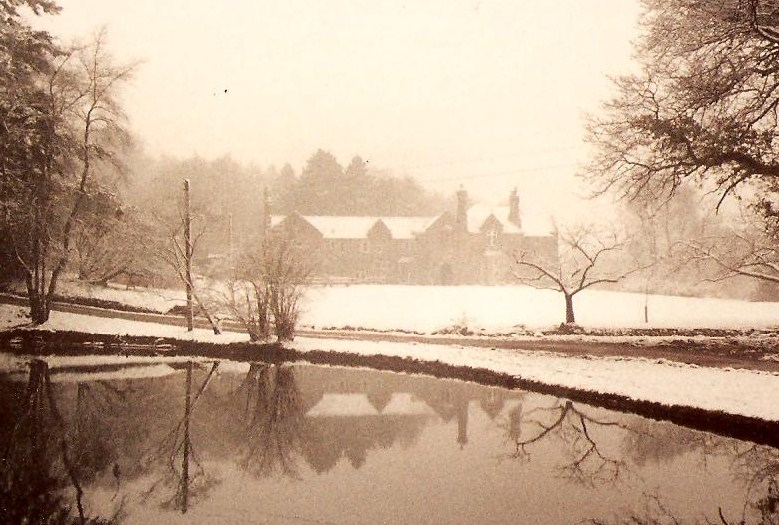
Bryngarw House circa 1960

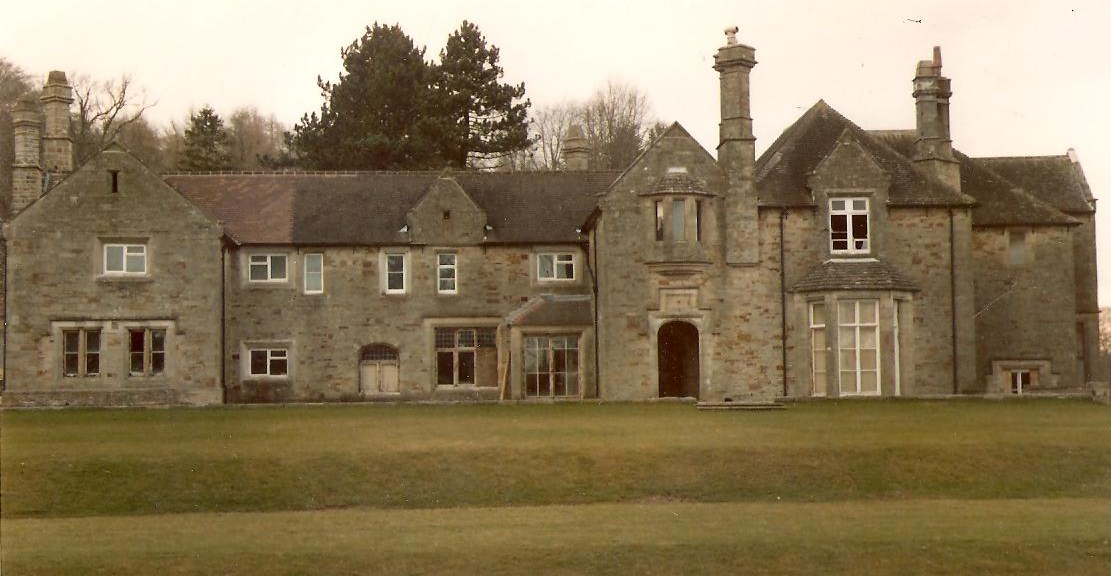
Bryngarw House circa 1980

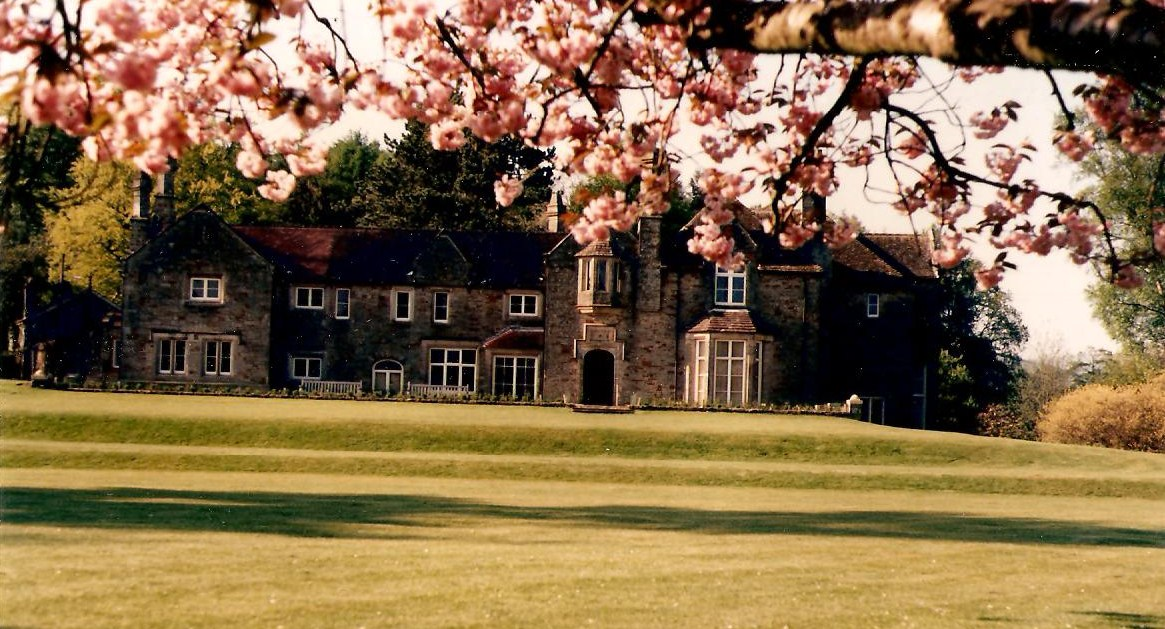
Bryngarw House circa 1990

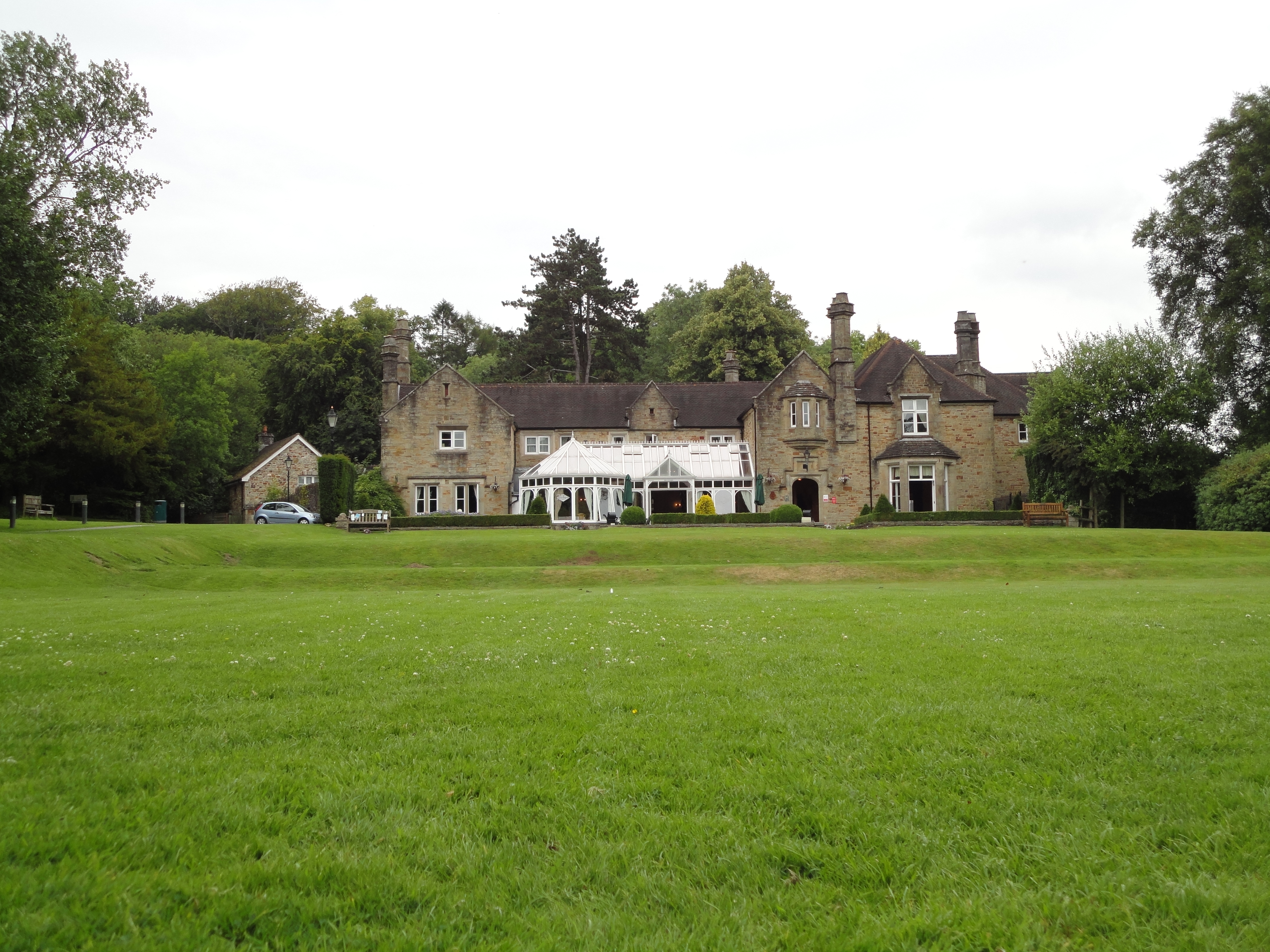
Bryngarw House 2011

== Woodland ==
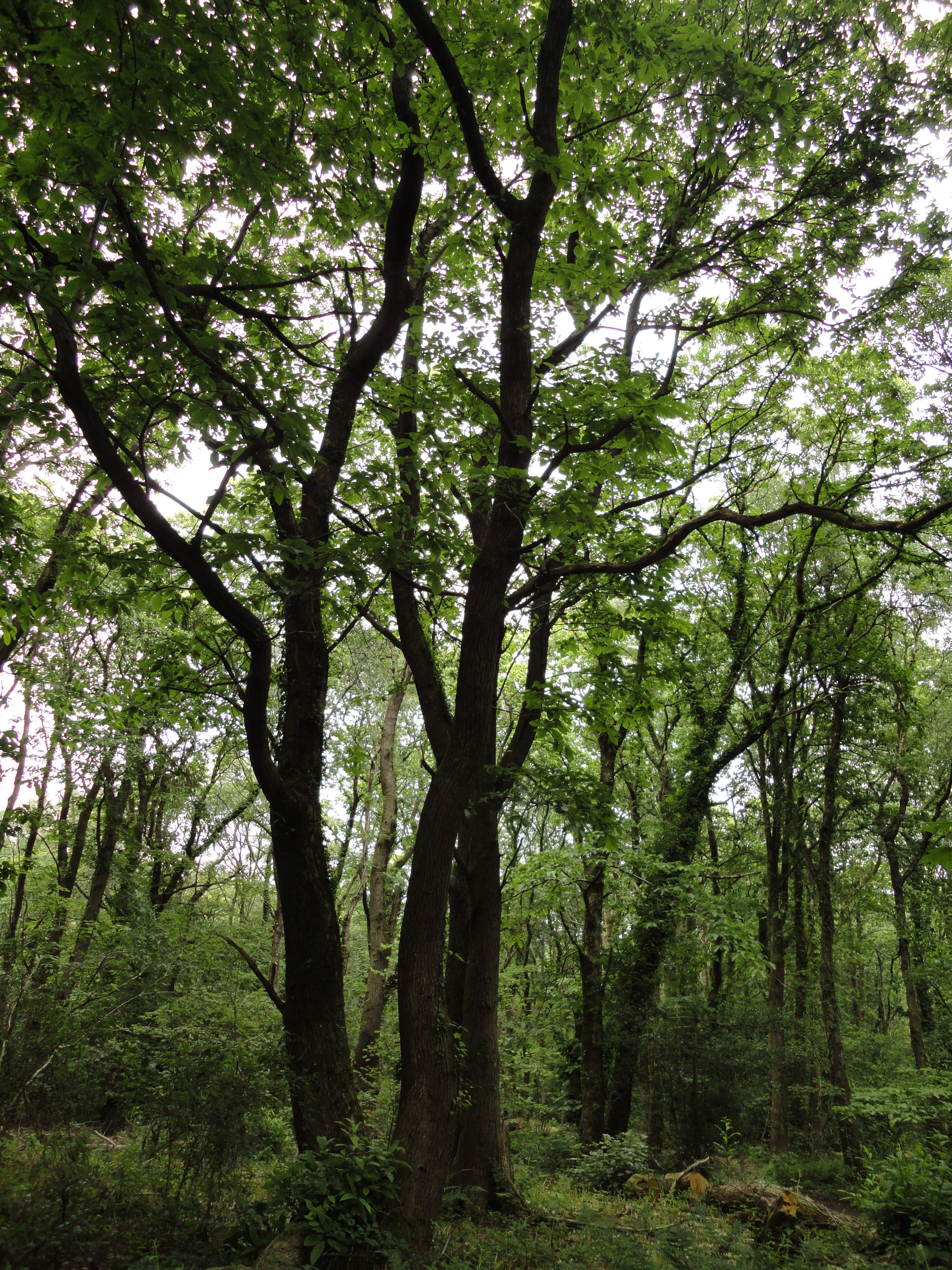
Coed Waunpiod west

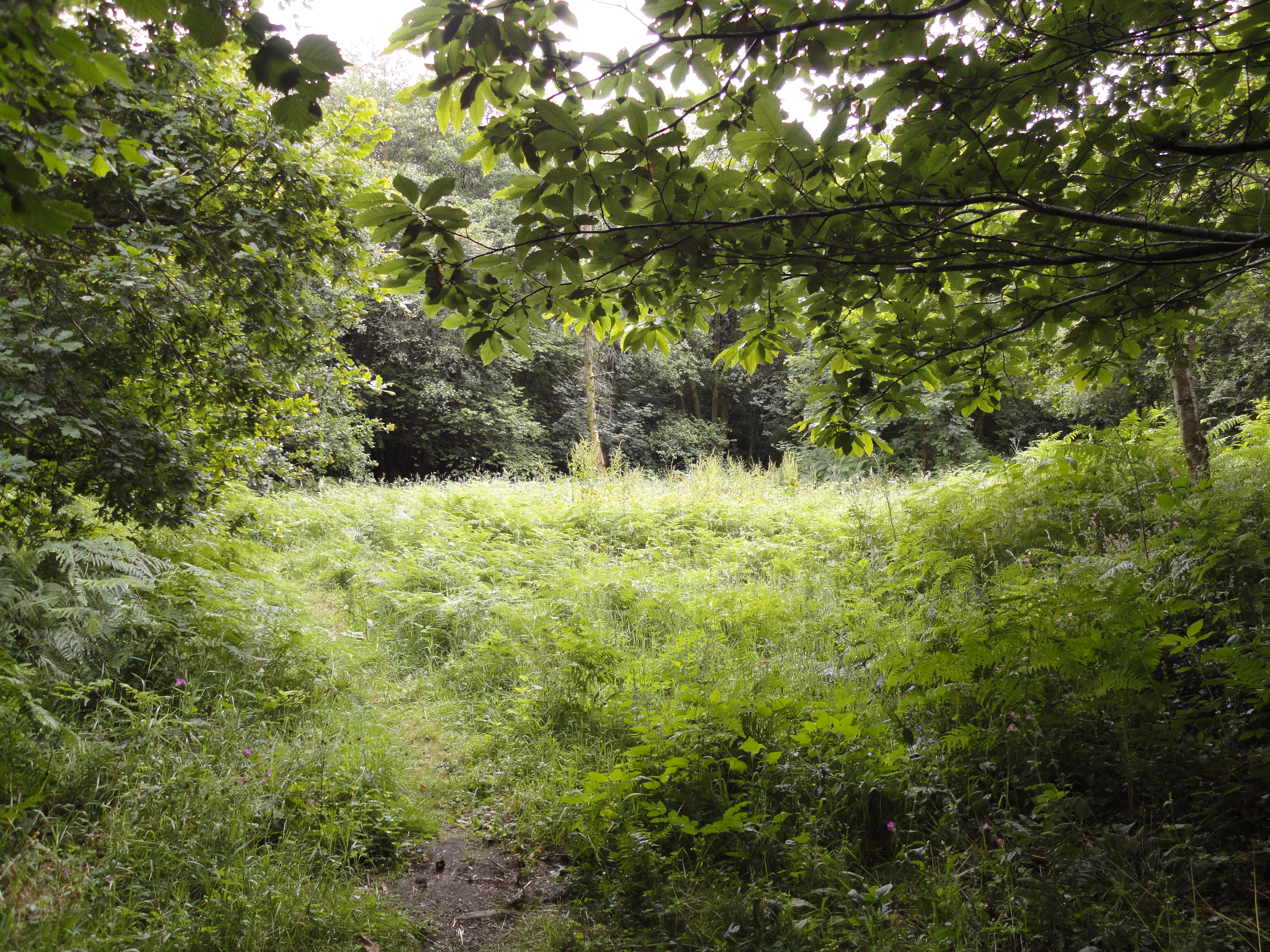
The wet triangle, Coed Waunpiod east

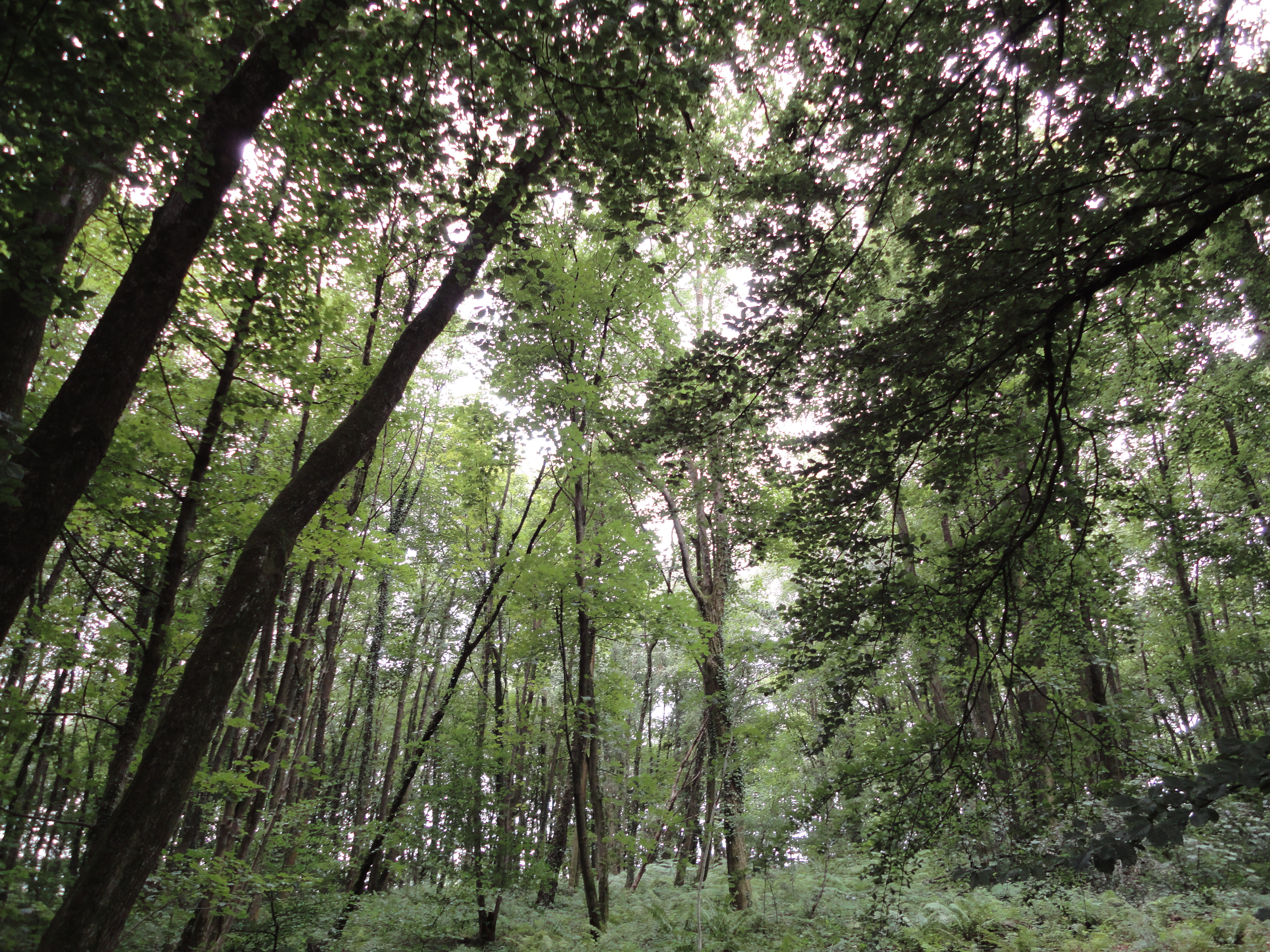
Sycamore Woods

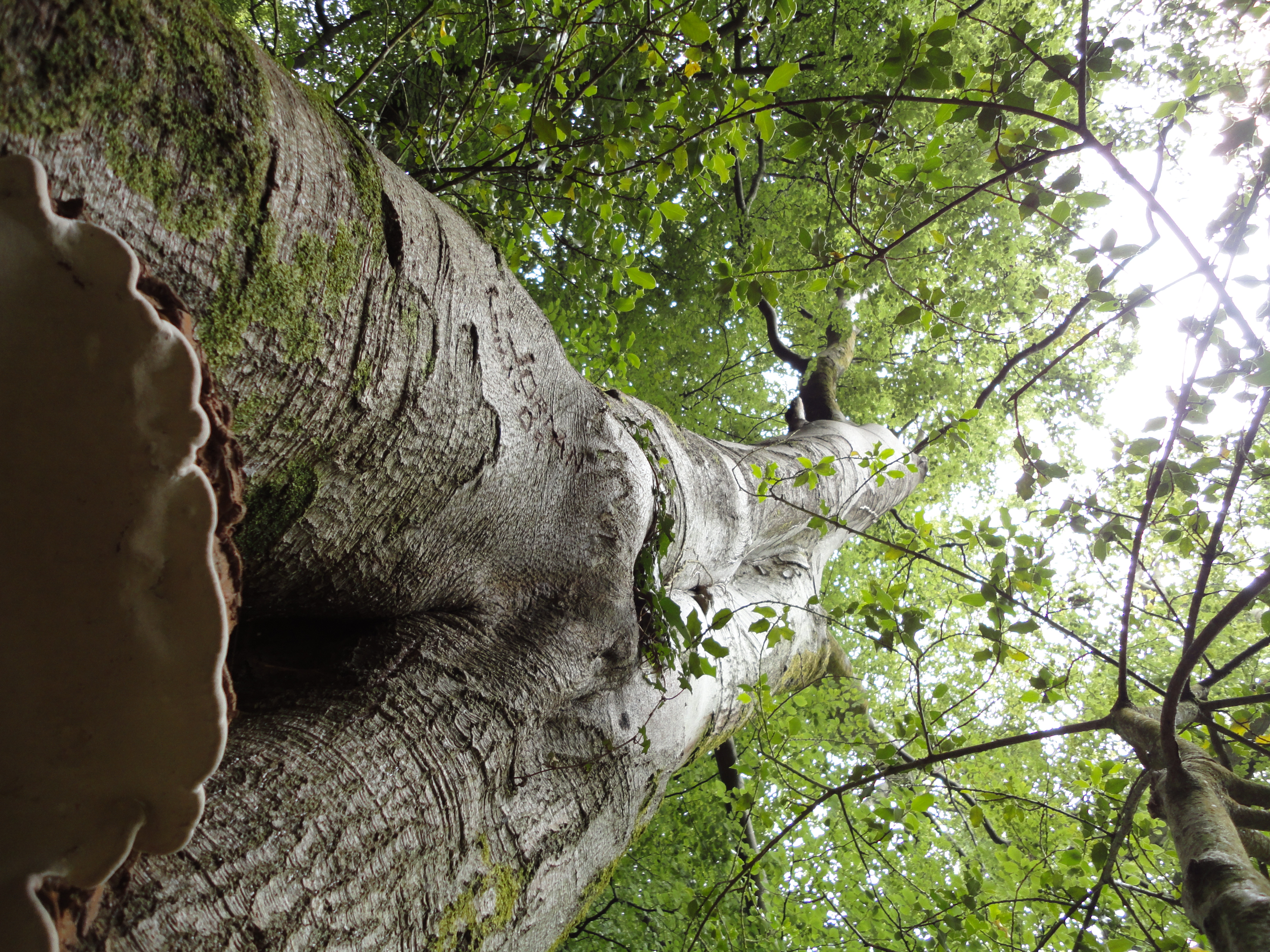
One of the infected beech trees from the Beech Avenue

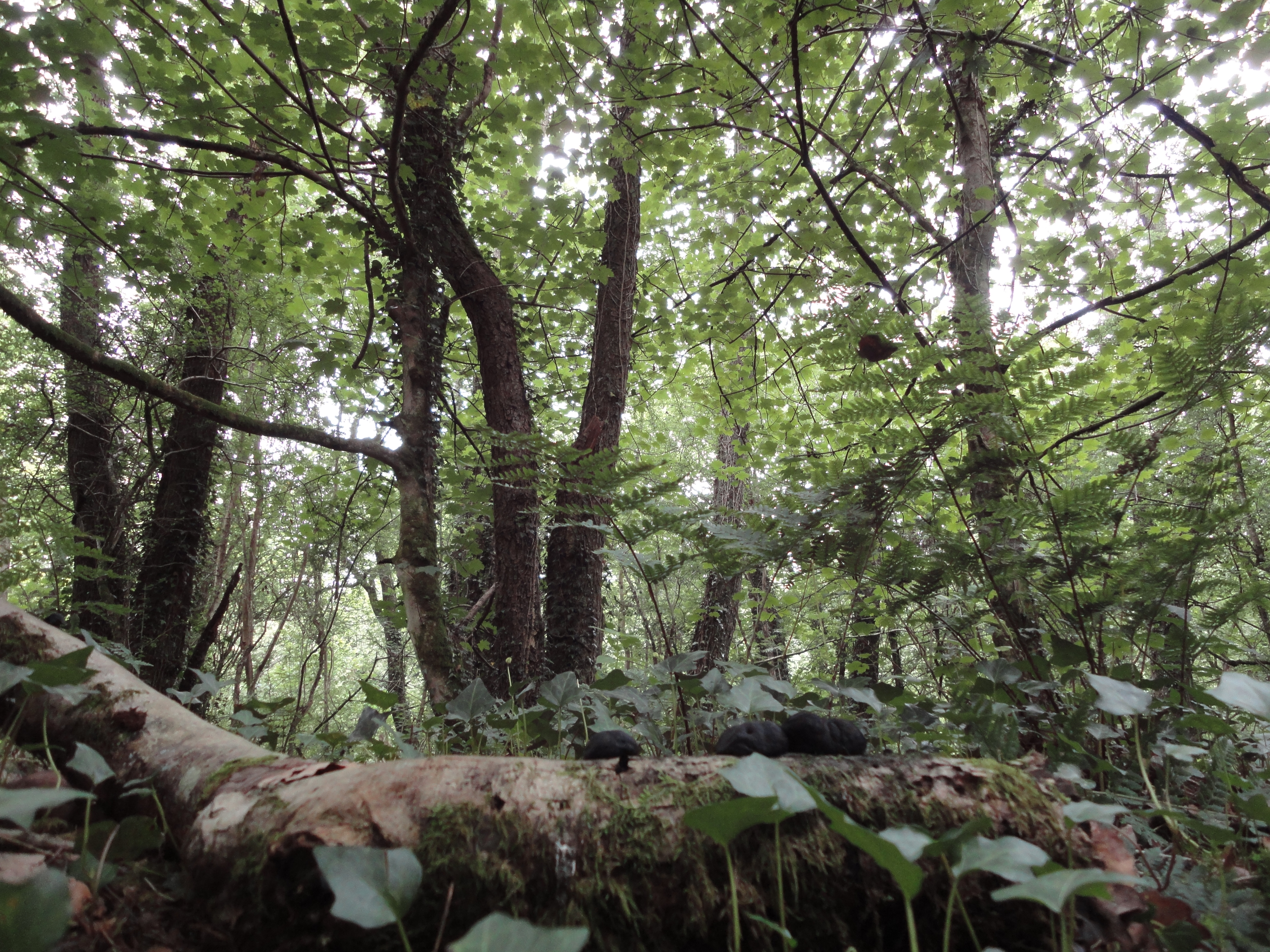
Wet Woodland

All the woodland areas in the park have been awarded grants under the Forestry Commission's scheme Better Woodland for Wales (BBW)

=== Coed Waunpiod west ===
Coed Waunpiod west is situated in the south-west corner of the park and is characterised by its numerous examples of sweet chestnut trees. The area also contains a number of mature oak, silver birch, hazel, holly and scots pine. Since 2009, the woodland has been subjected to a large-scale thinning project as the density of the stand had become too great and was affecting the health of the trees. The smaller weaker specimens were removed from the canopy to make space to allow the healthier individuals to thrive. This work is expected to be completed in 2012. This project has already allowed a noticeable improvement in the ground level and understorey flora. The woodland plays host to a wide range of species including speckled wood butterflies, wood mice, green and great spotted woodpeckers, buzzards and tawny owls.

=== Coed Waunpiod east ===
Coed Waunpiod east is found in the south eastern corner of the park. Its eastern border is formed by the River Garw. Due to this proximity to the river, and the river's unpredictable nature and predisposition to flood the woodland is classified as wet woodland. Coed Waunpiod east has been designated as a Site of Interest for Nature Conservation (SINC) due to the presence of semi-flooded dense stands of alder trees, known as alder carr. This is a locally important habitat, hence its management is subject to a Local Biodiversity Action Plan. (LBAP). Another interesting habitat within this area is a semi-flooded wild flower meadow (nicknamed the wet triangle by the rangers.) The rest of the canopy is dominated by a mixture of broad-leaf trees including oak, birch, larch, horse chestnut and hazel. The woodland fringe and the wet triangle are frequented by butterflies, dragonflies, dippers, herons, kingfisher and otters.

The wet triangle is a small (1/2ha approx.) isolated area found within this woodland with its own completely individual character. It is extremely wet and often retains free water during the winter months. Due to this a shade canopy has been unable to develop and so it is the only area of open wet woodland in the park. In 1989, the area suffered from vandalism and about a third of it was destroyed by fire, many of the original species in the burnt area were lost and it became colonised by bracken. The management of this area therefore focuses on the control and eventual elimination of bracken and the re-introduction of original species to the area leading to a thinning and coppicing regime in the future to ensure healthy growth.

=== Sycamore wood ===
The Sycamore wood lies in the north-west corner of the park and is topographically the highest point in the park. The site would have been categorised as ancient woodland until the end of the 19th century when it was felled and replanted with sycamore trees, to provide fuel for the house's biomass burners. They too were left unmanaged when the house was abandoned and have grown too tall and too close together. The modern management of this area is therefore to thin out the sycamore and add in native broadleaf trees (oak, hazel, birch and beech) to improve the health and biodiversity of the woodland. The most notable species in this area is the bluebells that appear in mid-April.

=== Coed Kensington ===
Coed Kensington is a largely unspoilt deciduous woodland found in the northern section of the park between the sycamore woods to the west and the wet woodland to the east. The management of this area is predominantly coppicing hazel and sycamore in a rotation pattern. Its notable species include great spotted woodpecker, lesser spotted woodpecker, green woodpecker, stoat and weasel.

The western border of Coed Kensington is informally marked by the ‘Beech Avenue’. The beech avenue was planted in 1837; since then however, many of the original trees have died and due to their similar age the others have all become susceptible to the parasitic fungus Ganoderma sp.. Since the discovery of the fungus they have been subjected to a tomography survey which deemed them unsafe. Many of the mature standards however have become very favourable summer roosts for the local bat populations, as their positioning creates a clear linear glade, which is used by the bats for navigation, in the damp woodland which is a key habitat for many the bat's invertebrate prey species. Legislation protects the bats and their roosts from disturbance and so the remedial work needed to allow the Beech Avenue to be re-opened must follow a comprehensive bat survey to determine the number of trees affected and by which species of bats and how many. Once this data is ascertained, the impact of the removal of these trees on the bat populations can be assessed, and a plan of works can be established. This work will not be able to be started until the bats have vacated these summer roosts and even then will have to be sympathetic, probably involving soft-felling techniques, where the limbs will be cut and lowered to the ground, to leave pollarded standards.

It is local legend that the twenty one beech trees which make up the beech avenue were planted in celebration of Queen Victoria's twenty first birthday and coronation.

=== Wet woodland ===
The wet woodland extends from the north of the oriental garden to the northern boundary of the park. Its eastern boundary is marked by the River Garw and its western boundary by the “Everglades path” adjoining Coed Kensington. The canopy is much shorter than that of Coed Kensington, Coed Waunpiod east and the sycamore woods as it is dominated by alder and hazel with frequent examples of ash, holly, grey willow and a few oak and birch. Due to the proximity to the River Garw, it is more often than not semi-flooded and is not frequented by large mammalian predators. This makes the area very successful for many species of ground-nesting birds. The aforementioned low canopy and damp conditions are also perfect for fungi and many types of invertebrates.

== Meadowland ==
=== Rhos pasture ===
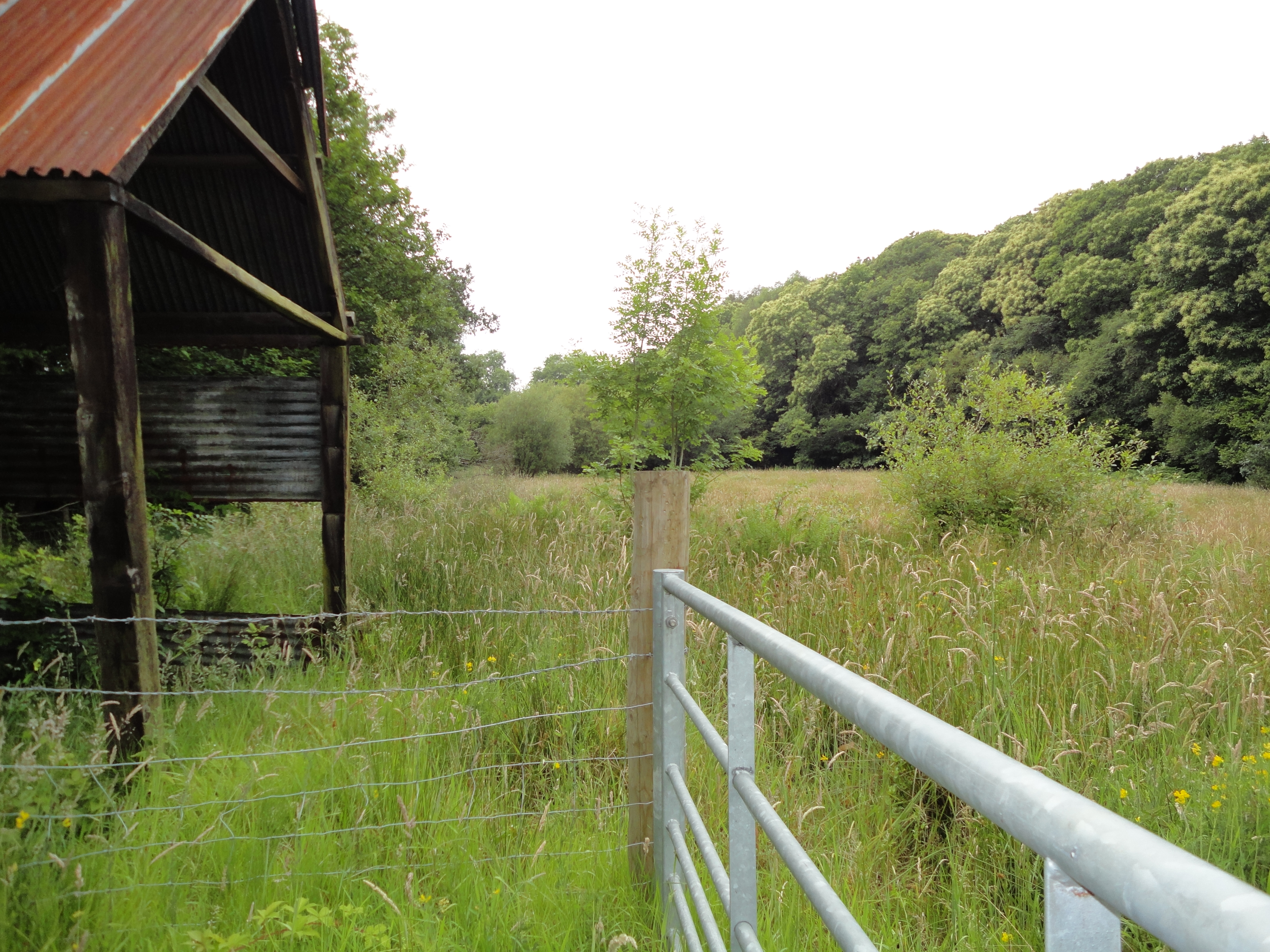
Rhos pasture

Rhos pasture (a Welsh term meaning 'rough' pasture) is found in the west at the most southerly point of the park. It is a small area that is enclosed by a strained rylock fence. The area is too wet to be mown throughout most of the year and so is grazed by a couple of cattle at the end of the growing season.

=== Meadows ===
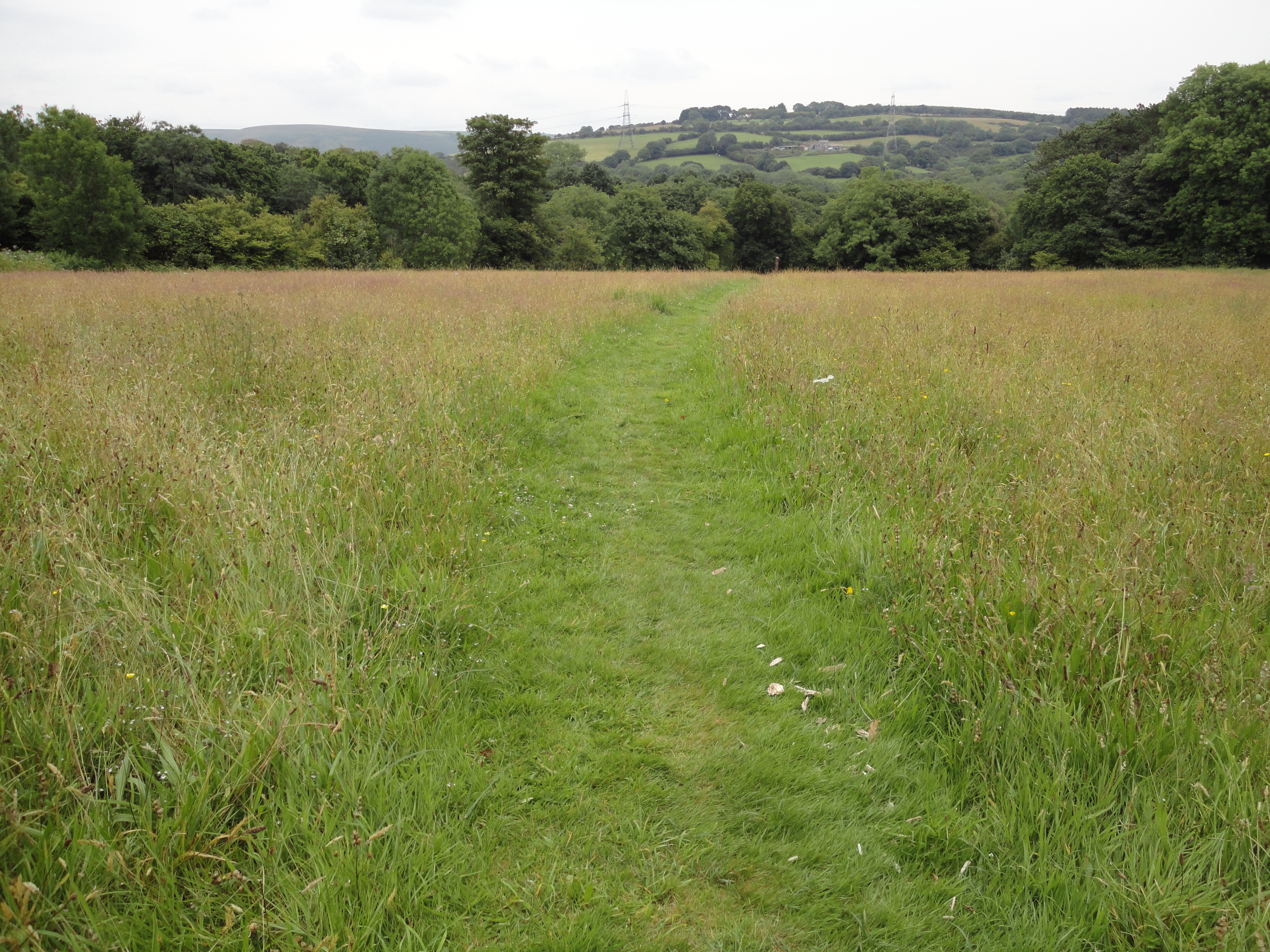
Meadows

The meadows are found on the western side of the park hidden behind the barbecue areas and Adventure playground to the east. Its southern boundary joins Coed Waunpiod west. The two meadows are divided and largely encapsulated by a mature hedgerow. “The meadows have considerable ecological value, both for low-growing plants and related insect such as butterflies. In addition, many woodland marginal species occur here along the hedgerows, including, whitethroat, spotted and pied flycatcher and common redstarts"

The meadows are managed in a style as close to traditional hay meadow management as the park's budget and requirements for access and amenity provision will allow. They are cut once a year, at the end of the growing season, and the biomass is removed. This is to encourage the growth of the wide variety of plants that prefer a low-nutrient soil. It is understood that an additional cut and collection during mid-late July, at a slightly different time each year, would also be desirable as this would benefit plants with different grass regime requirements. However, the current budget will not allow this additional expenditure. To further safe-guard the sward a path is regularly mown through the area during the spring/summer seasons. On their far western edges the meadows suffer from scrub and bracken encroachment, from the Public Right of Way (PRoW) from Brynmenyn. Whilst this scrub is controlled it has been deemed undesirable to completely remove it as it provides food for the faunal assemblages in the autumn.

=== Farmland ===
The 18 hectares of land that are subject to tenancy grazing have been let for many years. As part of the contract, the land has been assessed and put under a "specially tailored grazing regime which maximises the biodiversity potential of the area whilst also providing a buffer zone for the park and generating additional revenue".

== Wetland ==
=== Ornamental lake and ponds ===
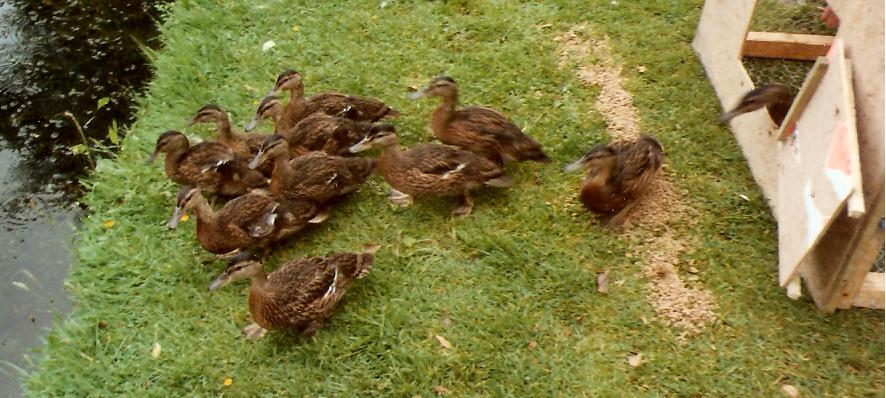
The first mallards introduced to the park 1993

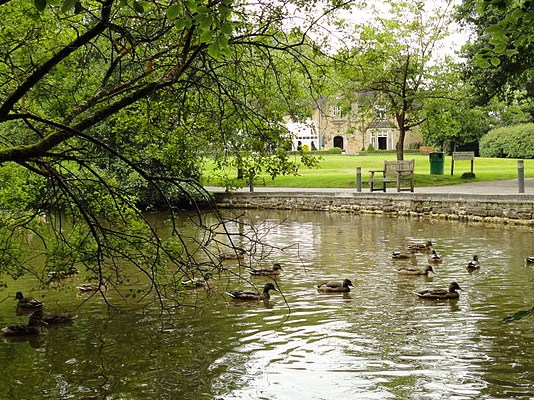
Lake and ducks

The spring-fed lake opposite the house covers approximately 0.5 acres and is the home to the park's population of semi-domesticated ducks. Residents include a number of species of fish; perch, rudd, roach, tench and several species of wildfowl; mallard, muscovy, Indian runners, Aylesbury ducks and moorhen. The lake also attracts a number of wild visitors including kingfisher, mink and heron. The vegetation surrounding the lake is dominated on its west side by bamboo with examples of flag iris, and loosestrife occurring in less densely vegetated areas of the banks. The northern bank leads onto the orchard; in this area and at other infrequent points around the lake individual trees are found on the bank. There is a small island located in the western half of the lake, it is dominated by flag iris and hence provides some shelter from both the elements and predators for young and nesting birds.

The lake was originally installed during Captain Traherne's ownership of the estate. Throughout the decades the lake 'silted-up' due to a lack of management and by the early 1980s had become more recognisable as a marsh than a lake. During the renovations, completed before the parks opening, in 1986 the lake was dredged and a sluice was installed to help regulate its water levels during periods of heavy rain. The lake is now largely unmanaged as previous measures to control the invasive canadian pondweed have proved successful.

A series of 3 ornamental ponds exists in the oriental garden and feed into the River Garw. The ponds are thought to be predominantly free from wildfowl and fish but do sport healthy populations of common toads, common frogs and palmate newts. The ponds also support a diverse aquatic invertebrate assemblage including, water boatman, pond skater, great diving beetle, water beetle, stonefly larvae, mayfly larvae, damselfly larvae dragonfly larvae, caddisfly larvae, non-biting midge larvae, blackfly larvae, cranefly larvae, midge larvae, water louse, freshwater shrimp and freshwater snail.

=== River Garw ===
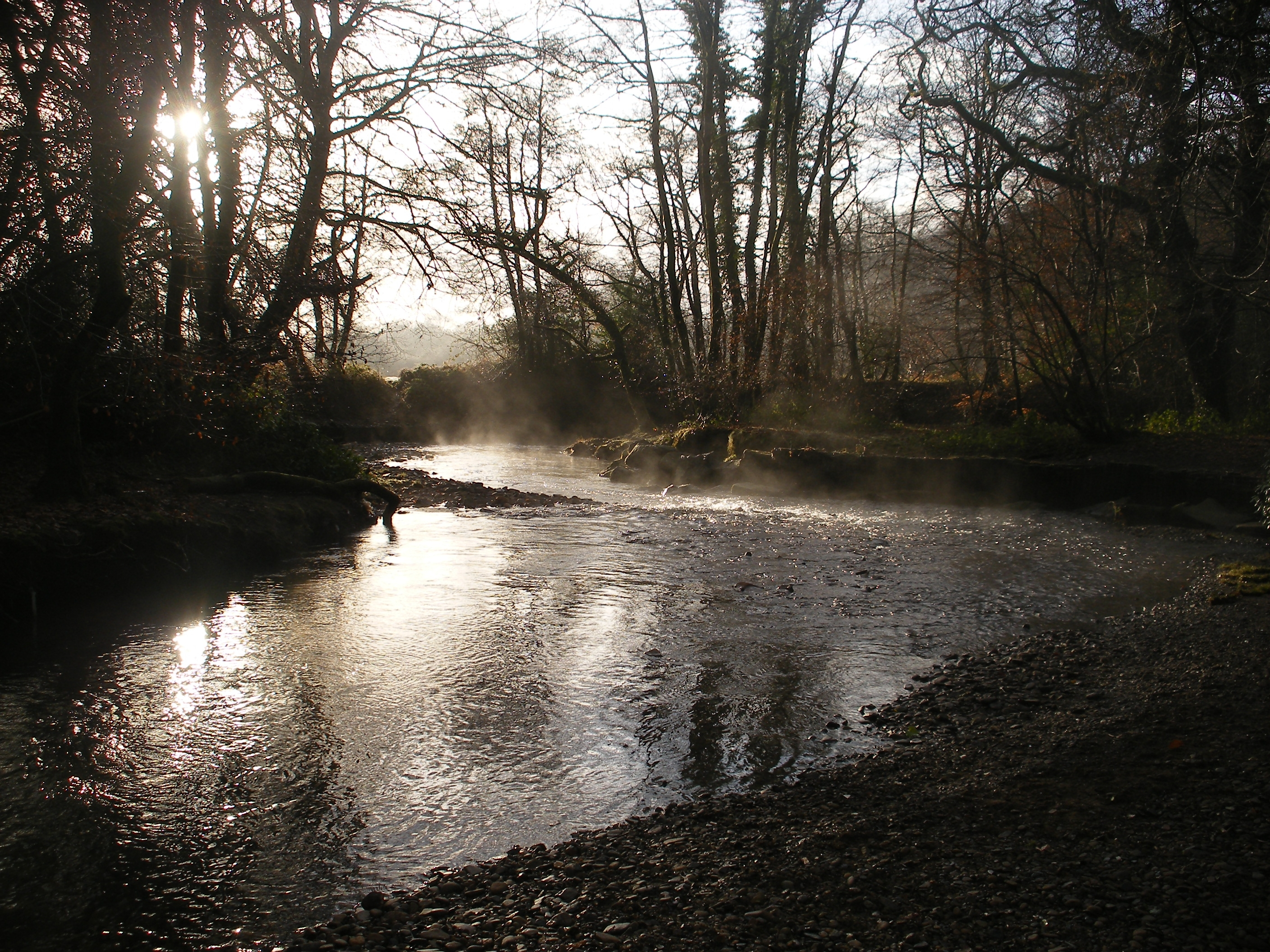
The River Garw

The River Garw translates from Welsh to mean ‘rugged river’. The river runs from Blaengarw, 12 miles to the north, and joins the River Ogmore in Brynmenyn. The river was once nicknamed the ‘black river’ as it was historically used to wash coal, however, the pollution from the coal dust has cleared up and the river has recovered well. The river now hosts a wide range of fauna e.g. otter, Daubenton's bats, kingfisher, spotted flycatcher and dipper.

== House and formal gardens ==
=== House and lawn ===
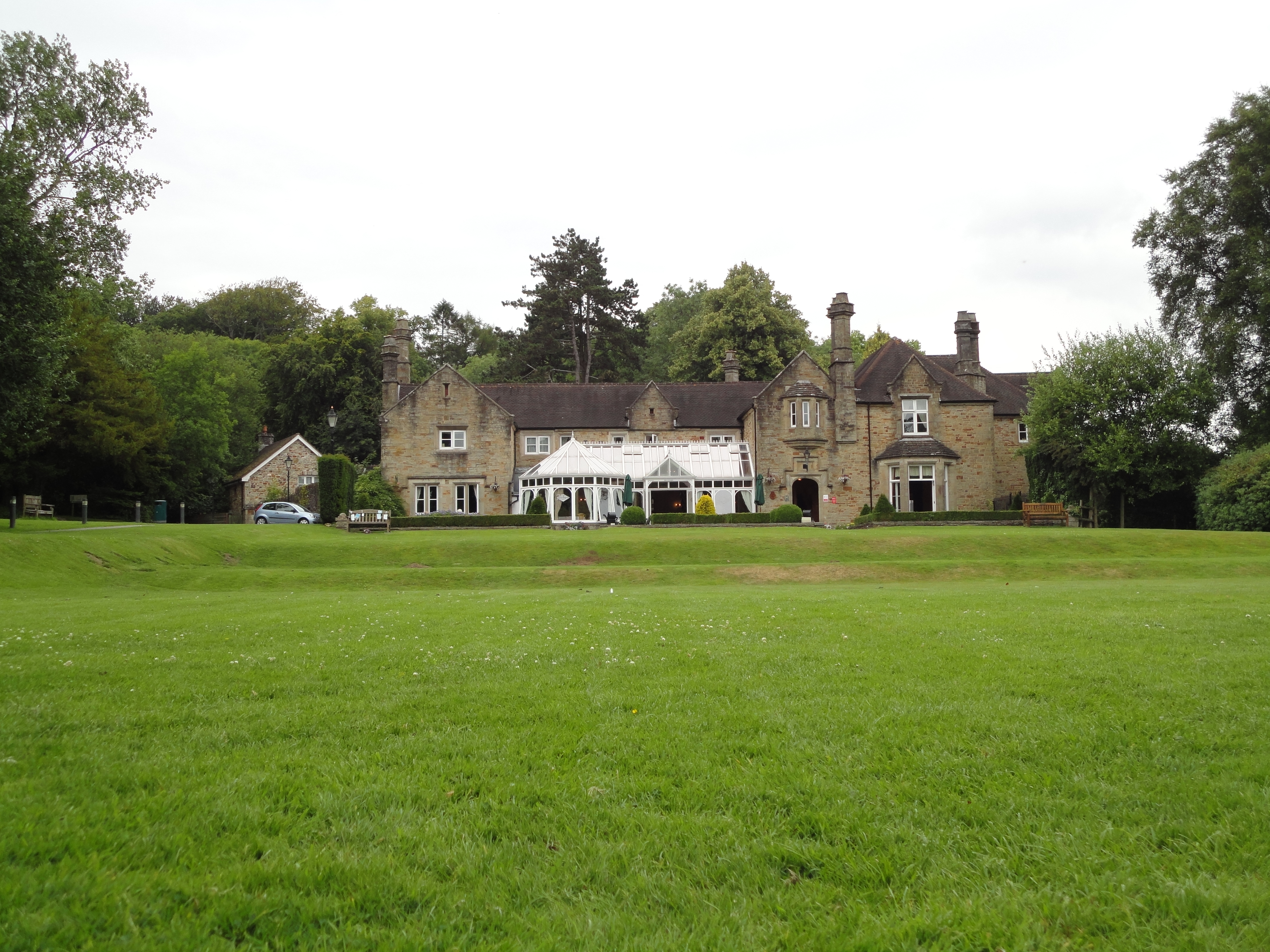
Bryngarw House 2011

Bryngarw House now predominantly operates as a hotel; it has "19 individually decorated bedrooms, all with en suite facilities". The Harlequin Restaurant, which has won the Wales Fine Cuisine Award, is situated in the house with the dining room in the large conservatory looking out over the lawn and grounds.

The lawn is managed as an amenity area and maintained by frequent mowing and treatment with fertiliser and pesticide when required. Due to this management regime the ecological value of the area is almost nil but it has been designed with the idea that this and the other amenity areas will take the 'brunt' of the people that have visited the park with a main aim to play, picnic and sit.

=== Oriental garden ===
Developed between 1910 and 1920, this area is the home of many of the exotic species that Captain Traherne installed on the estate. Whilst much of the infrastructure in the area has been replaced since the original installation, the ambiance of the area has remained. The Japanese style bridge and tea house that are present in the area are a modern addition, having been installed in the work completed before the estate opened as a Country Park. Originally, the main entrance to the area would have been from the lawn in front of the house descending the hill to the west of the garden to the series of three linked ponds. Whilst the area can still be accessed this way, the main route in is now the path running from north to south following the river linking the everglades path to the cycle path bridge. The ‘One Historic Garden’ Centre of Excellence Scheme is funding the restoration of this area during the autumn of 2011. The garden is designated at Grade II on the Cadw/ICOMOS Register of Parks and Gardens of Special Historic Interest in Wales.

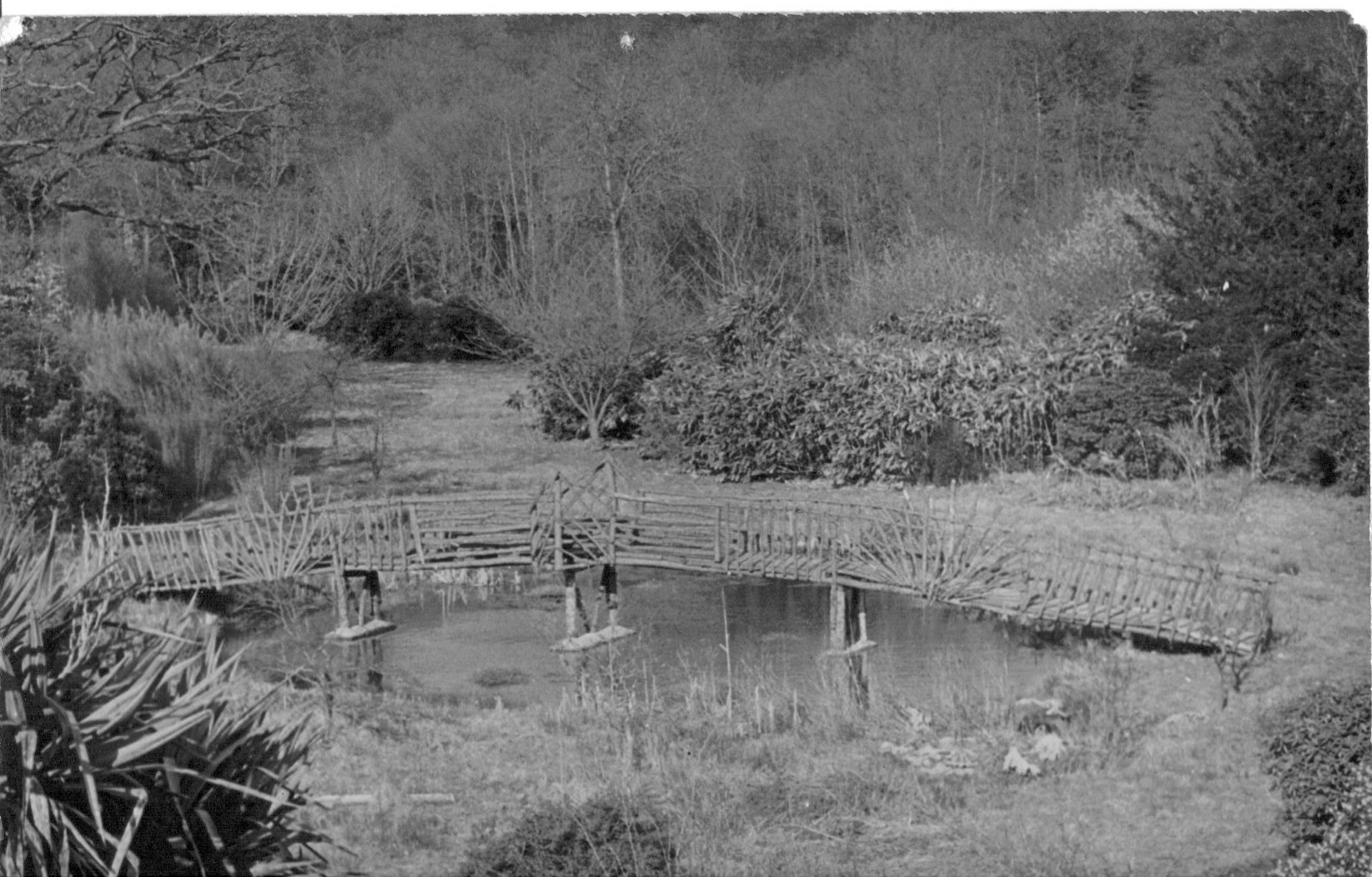
Oriental Garden circa 1940

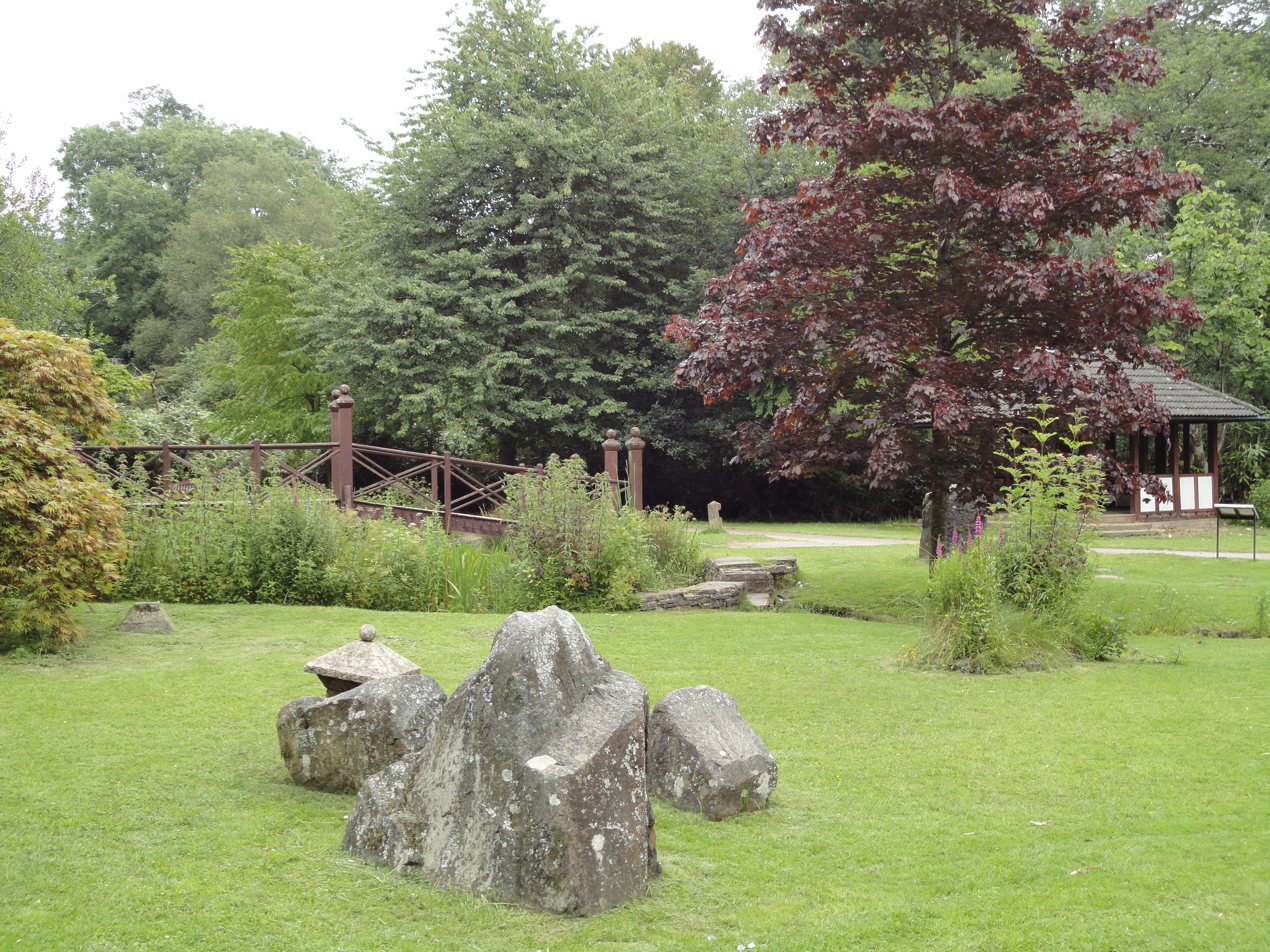
Oriental Garden 2011

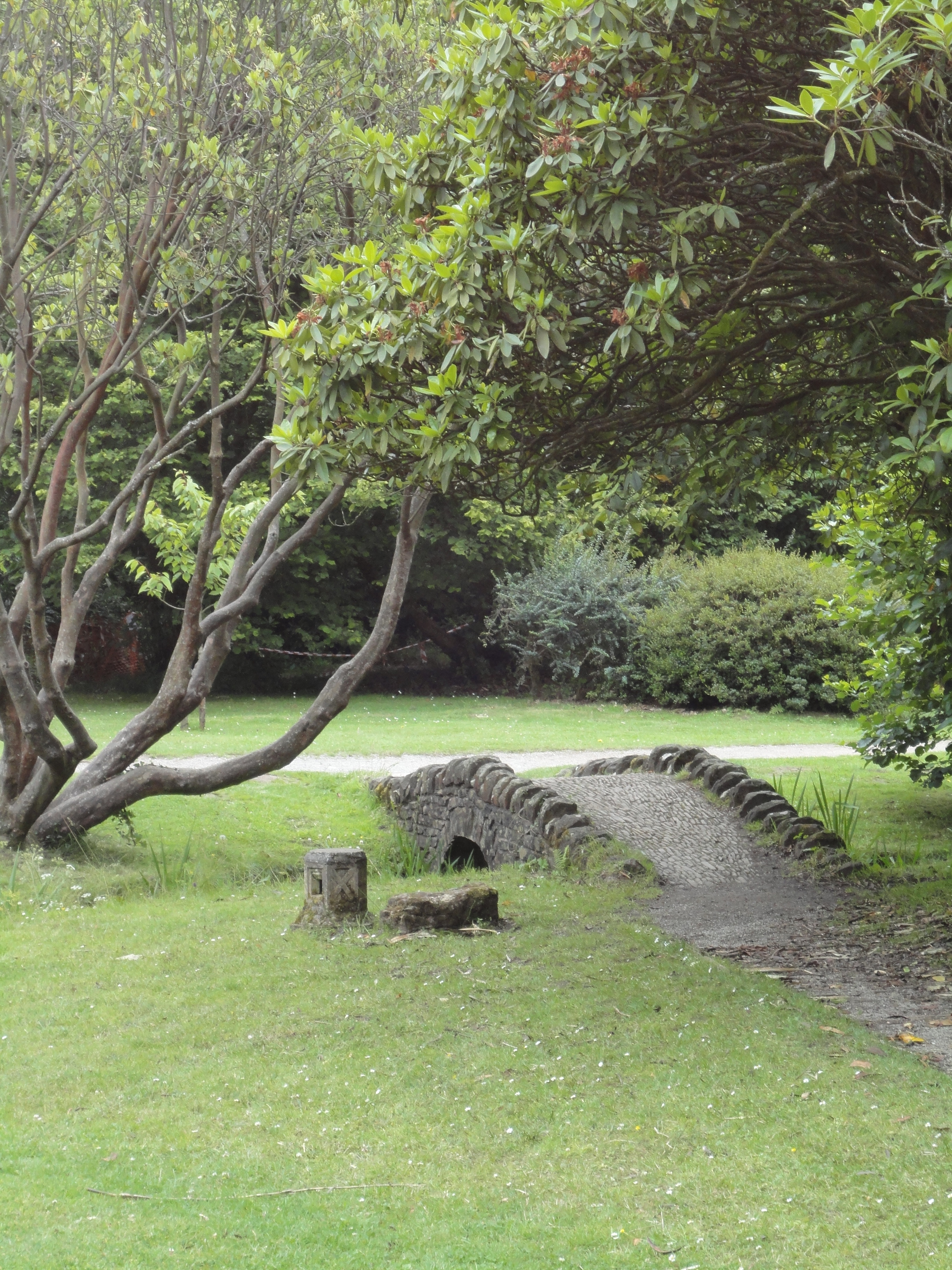
Oriental Garden 2011

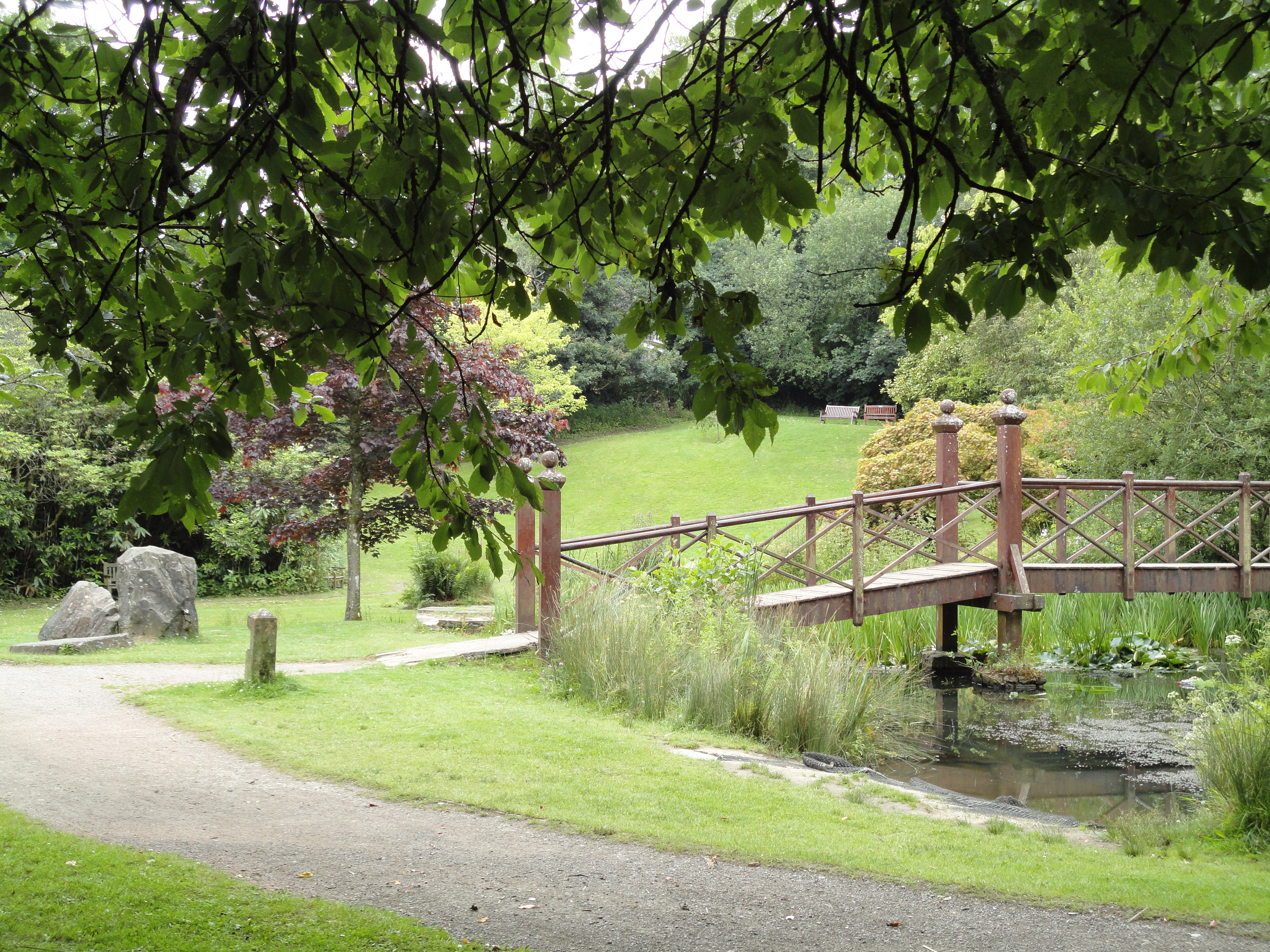
Oriental Garden 2011

=== Orchard ===
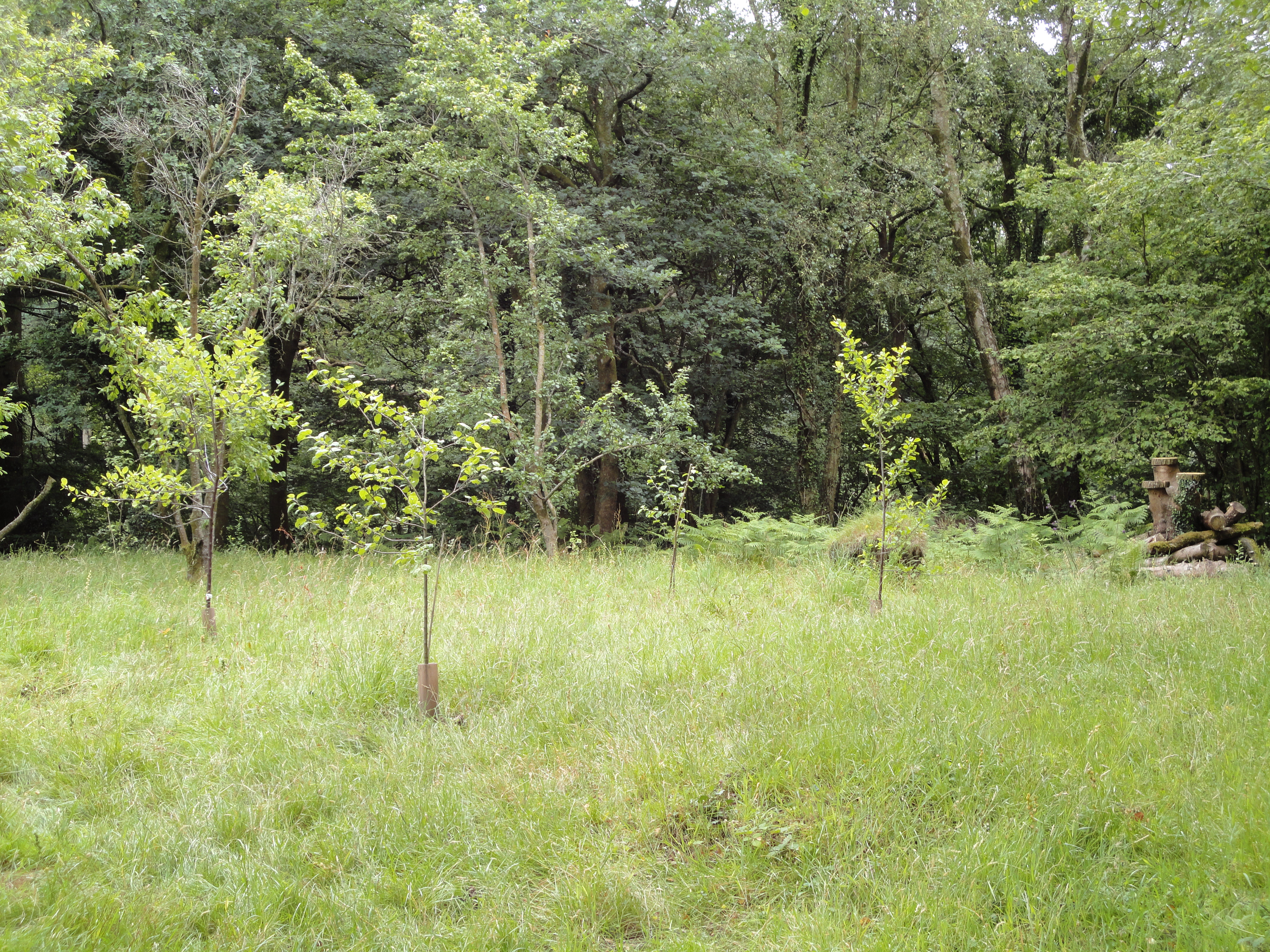
Orchard in 2011

The Orchard was originally part of the kitchen garden for Bryngarw House, and hence is the home of many very old specimens of fruit trees. After the house was abandoned as a permanent residence for the Traherne family, the Orchard suffered many years of neglect. During this period it became overgrown with pernicious weeds and rank grasses that have negatively affected the health of many of the trees present. In 2010 however a new project to return it to its previous glory was initiated by the rangers. Several new fruit trees of local provenance have been added including apple, pear, plum and greengage. The old hedgerow marking its western boundary has been laid in the style of traditional hedge management of the local area, and a new hedge has been installed along its eastern boundary to establish a complete natural boundary to the area.

Whilst the young fruit trees develop, the open nature of the canopy has greatly benefitted the ground flora and allowed it to flourish. The species composition of the area is diverse, with notable species including; bluebell, pignut, wood anemone, primrose and cowslip.

=== Woodland Garden ===
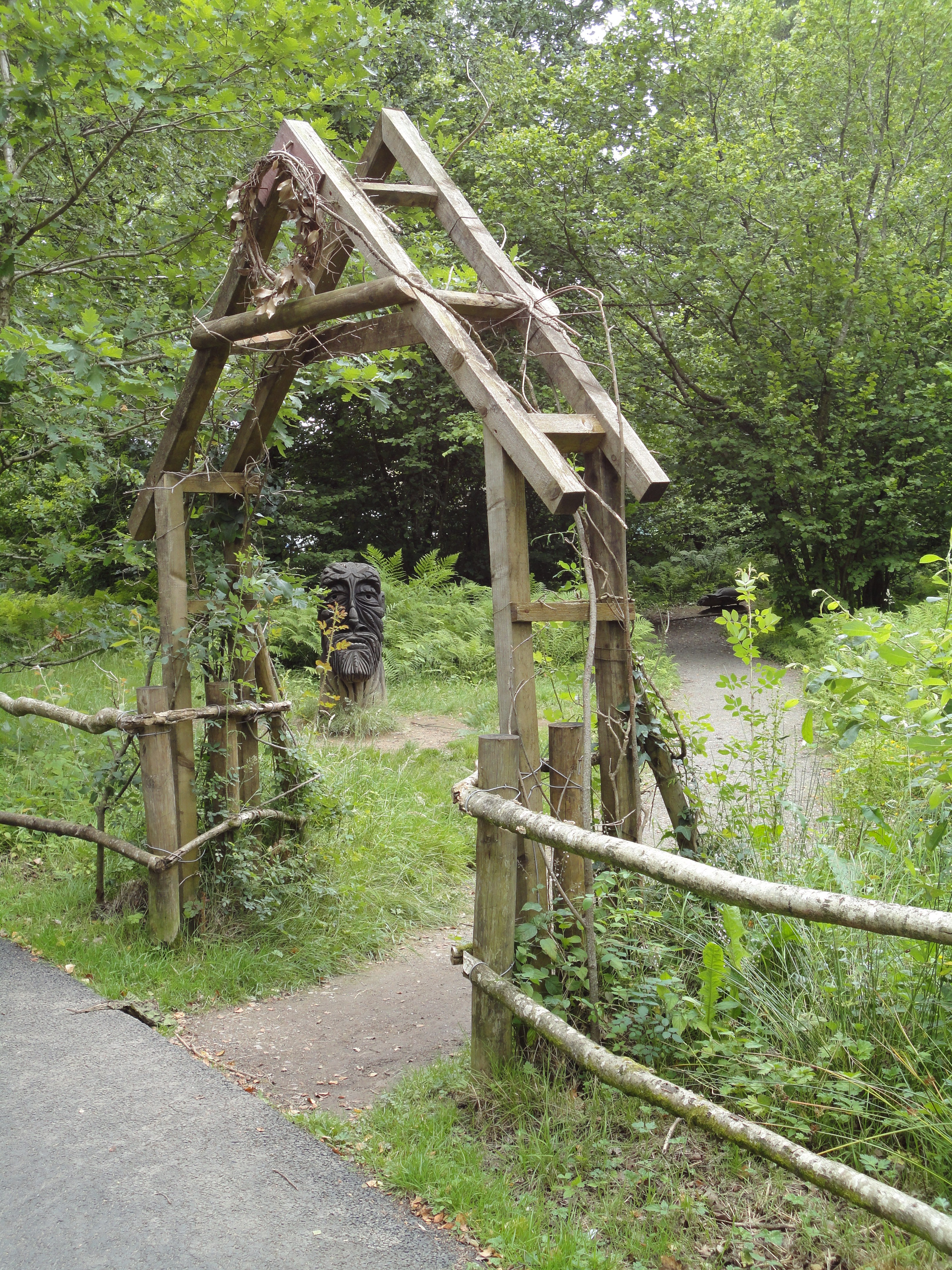
Entrance to Woodland Garden and 'Green Man'

The Woodland Garden is situated to the north of the orchard and was originally the herb garden of the house. However, when the house was abandoned the area became disused and overgrown. The area was subsequently not seen as having any real value and during the 1993 renovation work on the house was used as a spoil tip. It remained as a spoil tip until 2005 when the area was reclaimed by the Rangers and converted into a custom-made wheelchair accessible area. This area was chosen for this purpose as it is one of the only areas to topographically satisfy the pertinent legal requirements. The area is also well used by visiting school children on environmental education trips as it has been installed with several large wood carvings that aid environmental interpretation. The area is still being developed for both purposes.

== Amenity areas ==
=== Visitor centre, café and toilets ===
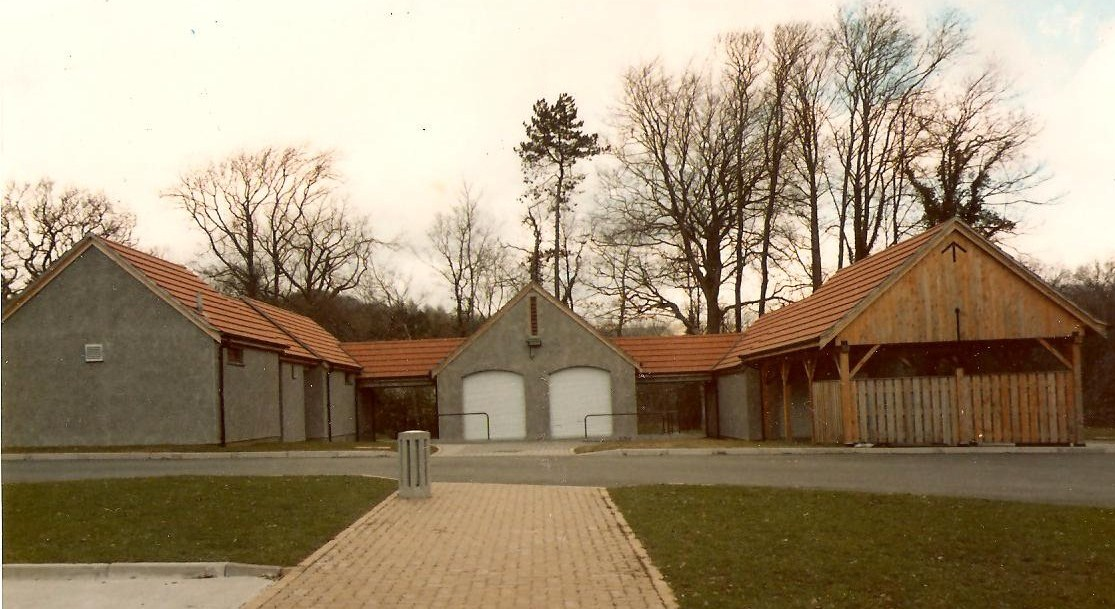
Visitor centre prior to opening 1986

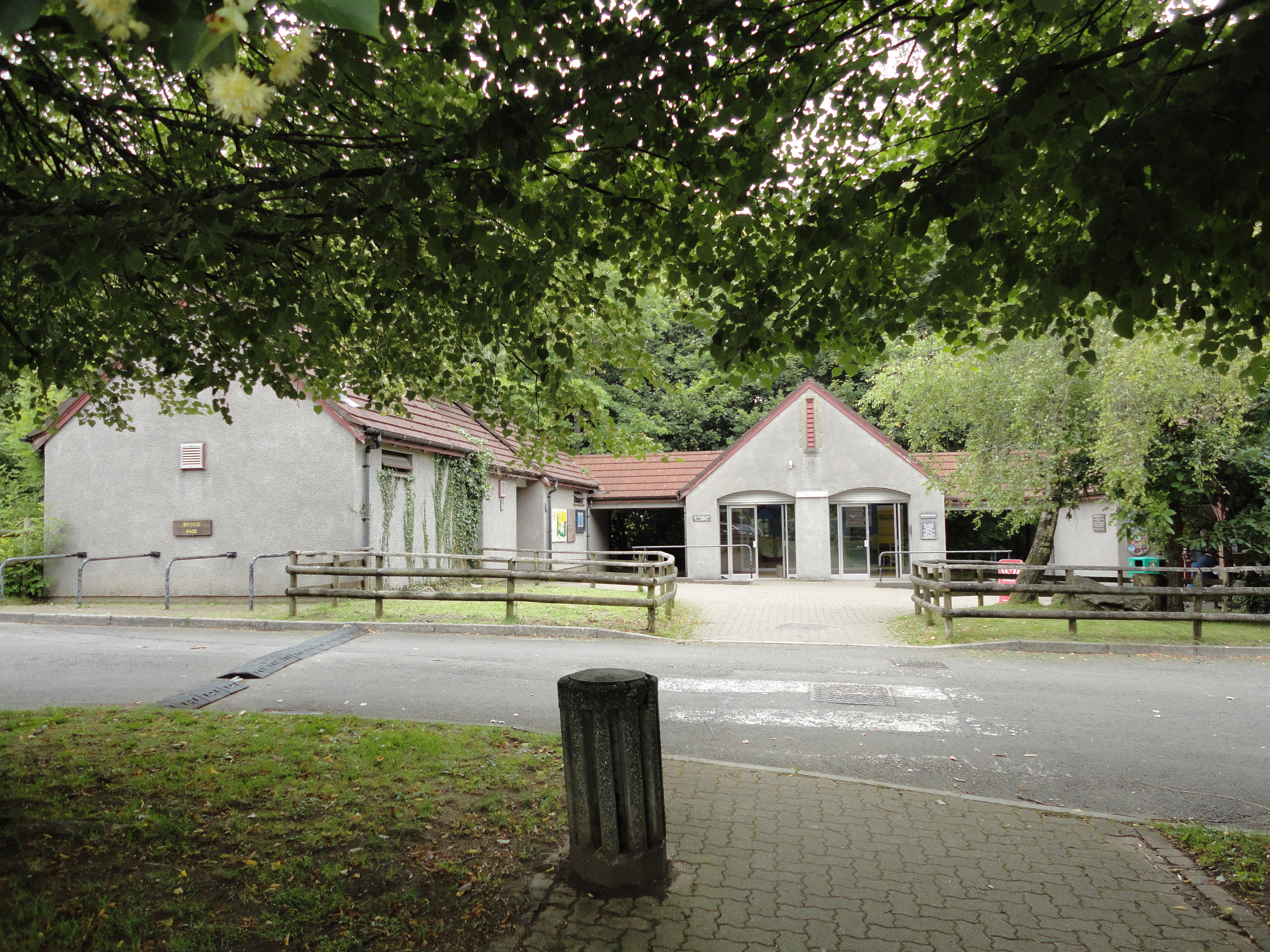
Visitor centre and Toilets

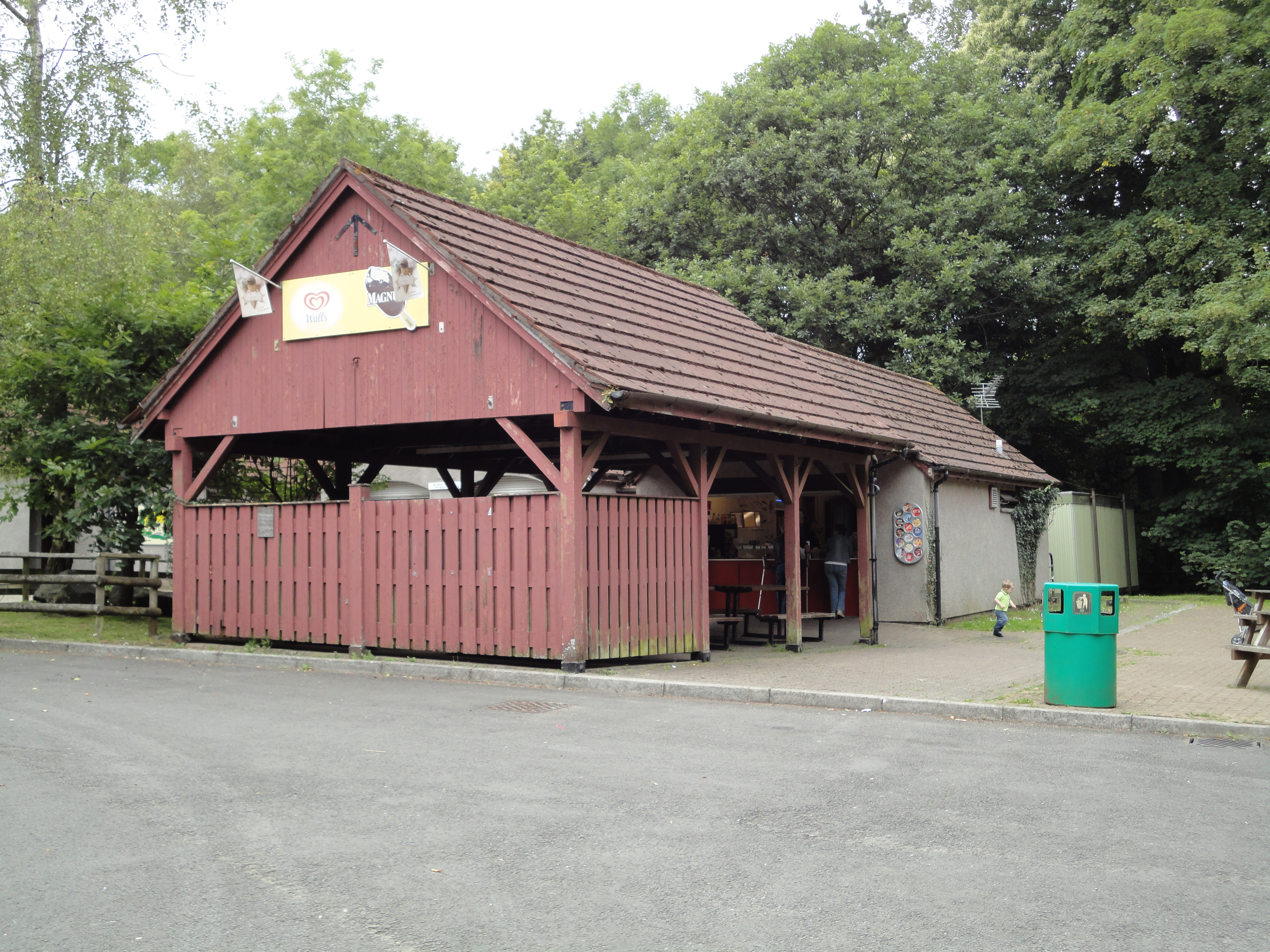
Cafe

The visitor centre, café and toilet buildings are set at the north end of the car park. The building was constructed and furnished in 1982.

One notable ecological aspect of these buildings is that their roof voids are known to support summer bat roosts for soprano pipistrelle and brown long-eared bats.

=== Adventure play area ===
The adventure play area is located in the western half of the park to the north of Coed Waunpiod west and opposite the car park. It consists of a '50 ft tower slide' with 3 shoots at different levels, regular and toddler-safe swings, 2 combination adventure/climbing structures, self-spinning disc and 2 spring mounted 'wobbly horses'. There is also a purpose built climbing boulder located in the barbecue area.

=== Barbecue and picnic areas ===
There are several designated picnic areas around the park but by far the largest is to the north of the play area. During busy and peak periods, the eastern part of this field, separated by a line of 2 ft posts, is used as the over-flow car park.

== Gallery ==
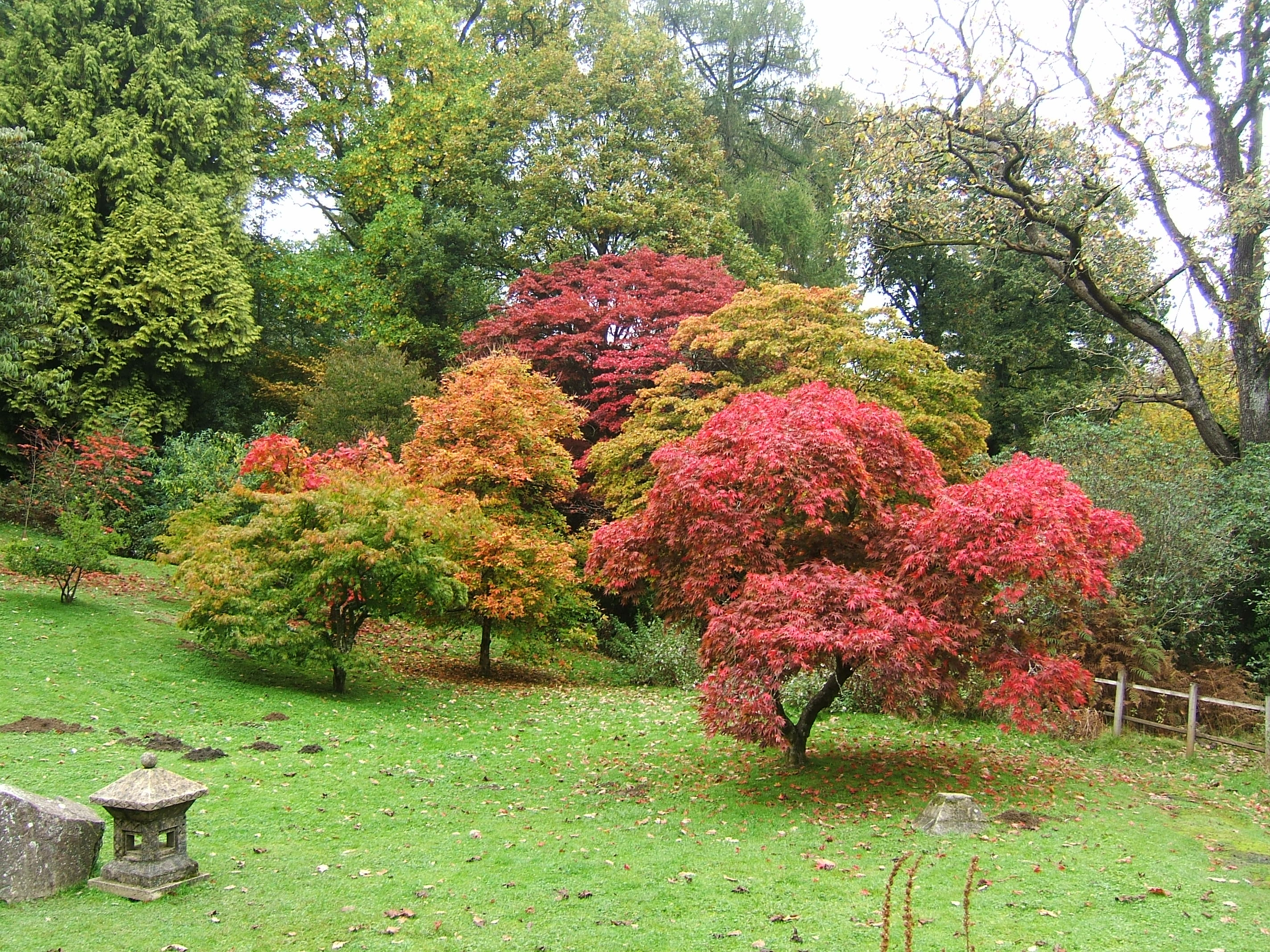
Maple in autumnal colours in the Oriental garden

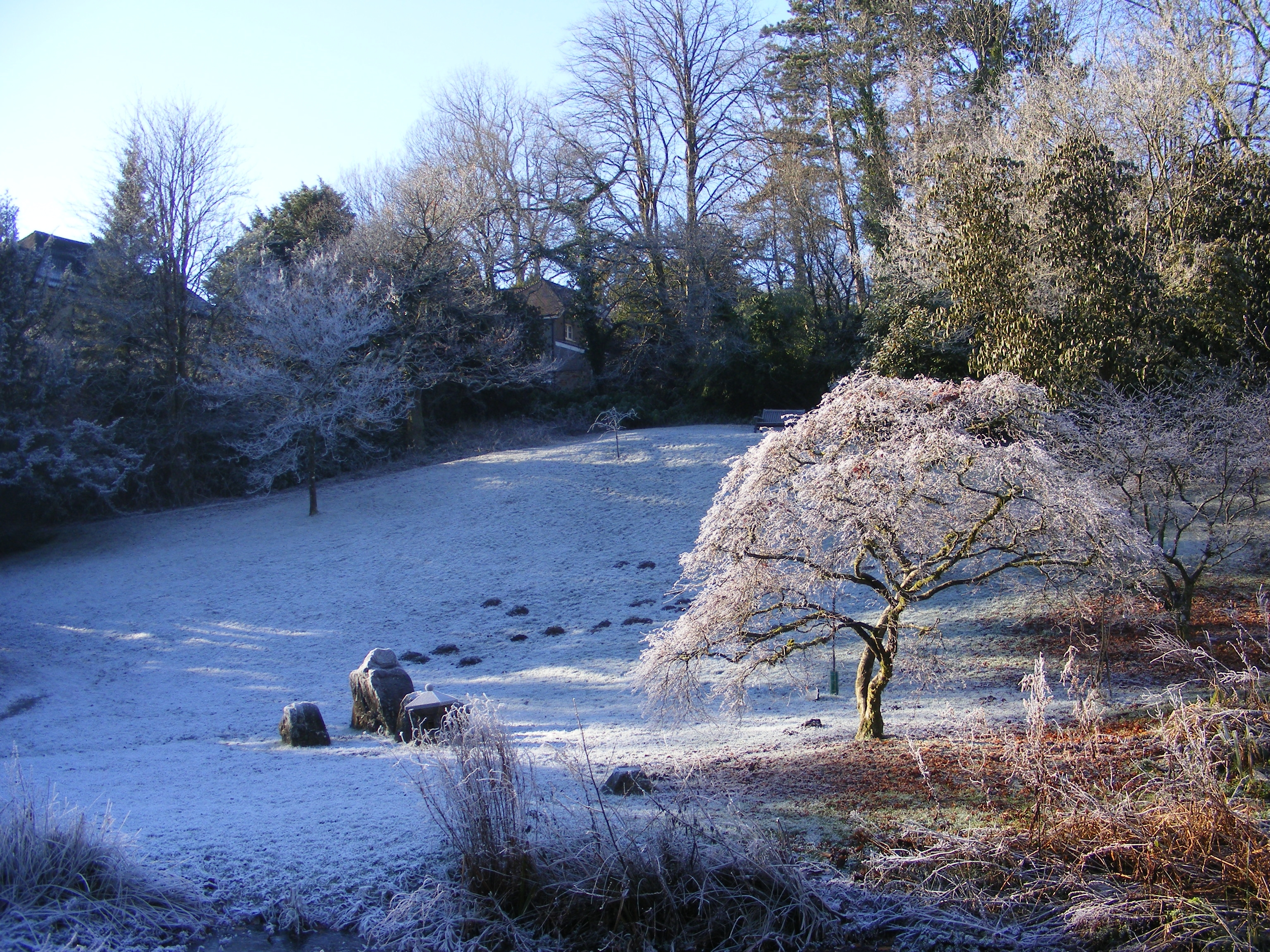
Maple covered in frost in the Oriental garden

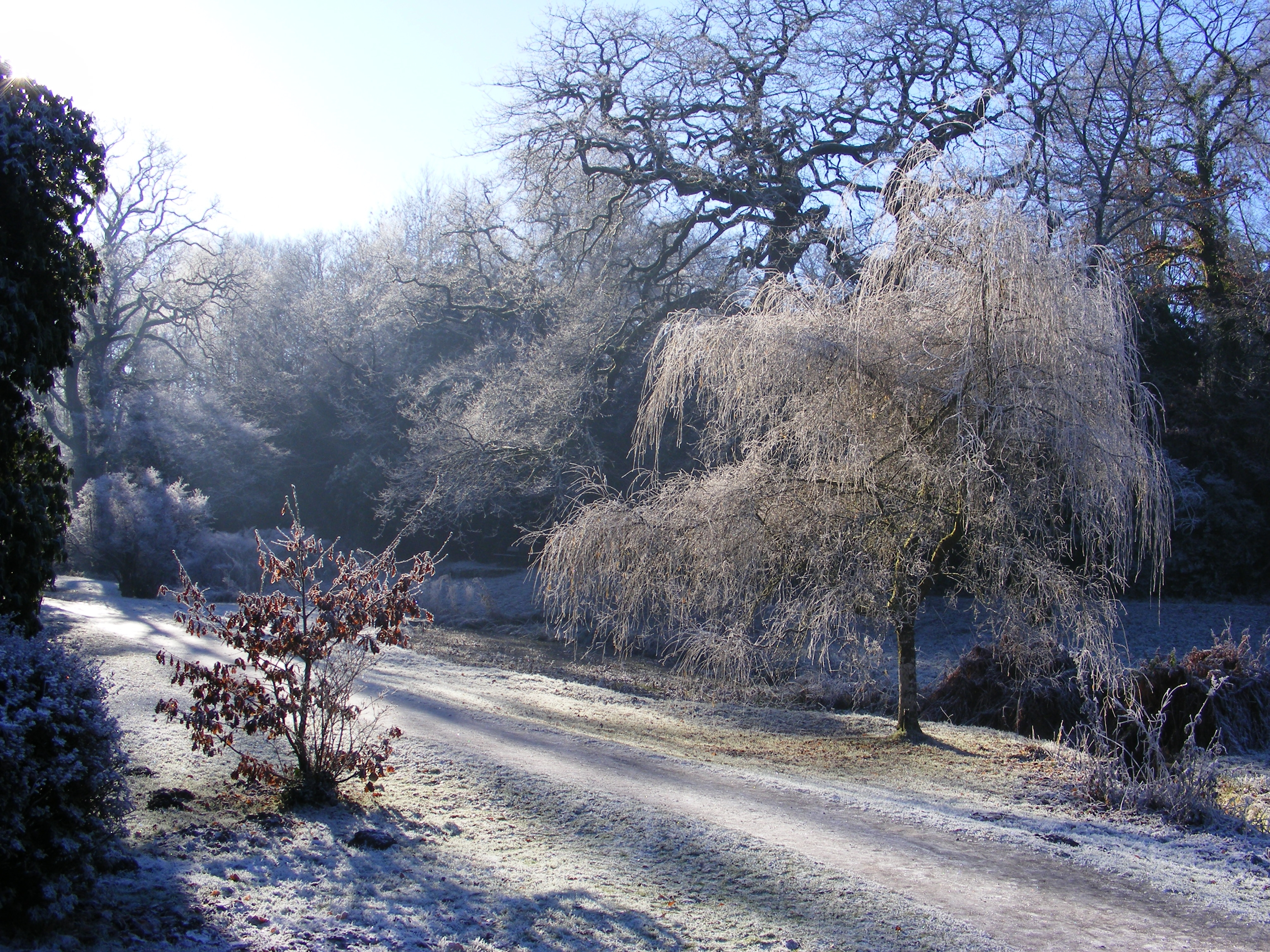
Weeping willow covered in frost in the Oriental garden

== See also ==
- List of gardens in Wales
