= Pontycymer =

Village in Bridgend County Borough, Wales

Coordinates: 51.612°N 3.584°W

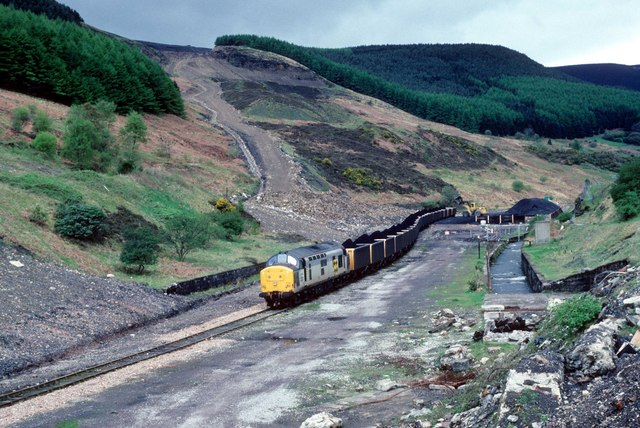
- Coal loading point at Pontycymer in 1992

- Location within Bridgend
- Population: 2,499 (ward.2011)
- OS grid reference: SS904915
- Principal area: Bridgend
- Preserved county: Mid Glamorgan
- Country: Wales
- Sovereign state: United Kingdom
- Post town: BRIDGEND
- Postcode district: CF32 8
- Dialling code: 01656
- Police: South Wales
- Fire: South Wales
- Ambulance: Welsh
- UK Parliament: Rhondda and Ogmore

Pontycymer, also spelt Pontycymmer, is a former mining village in Wales. It is situated in the Garw Valley, in Bridgend County Borough, about 7 miles or 11 km north of the town of Bridgend.

Its attractions include Bridgend Valleys Railway and many woodland trails through forestry and surrounding mountains.

== Name ==
The name is Welsh: pont means "bridge" and cymer means "confluence", i.e. where two streams or rivers meet.

Older signs for the village use the spelling of Pontycymmer; as with many other place names in Wales a double "mm" was historically included as an Anglicised spelling, but the modern Welsh spelling uses a single "m". Recent signage and post office records have been changed to reflect the original Welsh spelling.

== Description ==
At the southern (lower) end of the village, marking its boundary with Pantygog, the River Garw is joined from the east by the Nant Fforch Wen ("White Fork Stream"). This area is still known as "Braich y Cymmer", reflecting the historical spelling with "mm". At the northern (upper) end, towards its boundary with Blaengarw, the River Garw is joined by the Nant Gelli Wern ("Marsh Grove Stream") at Ffaldau, the village square.

Among those born in the village are the artist and journalist Molly Parkin (Molly Thomas), snooker player Ryan Day, Welsh rugby captain John Lloyd and Welsh rugby league player Ike Owens. Dr Dan Davies (physician to the king and chief advisor for the establishment of the NHS), Phylip Henry Rees (preacher and evangelist of the Gospel) and Wendy Phillips, ‘the cleaning lady who went to Hollywood’ who was the inspiration for all Sara Sugarman's films. It was also home to the author, neuroscientist, and stand-up comedian Dean Burnett.

Numerous locations in Pontycymer feature as the fictional village of Ogw in the film Very Annie Mary, as well as in scenes from six other short films by Sugarman.

The oldest street in the village is Railway Terrace, originally named "Milk Row".

== Governance ==
Pontycymmer was formerly an electoral ward to Bridgend County Borough Council. It elected one county councillor. The ward was represented by the Labour Party, with the exception of 1999-2004 when Plaid Cymru were elected. Since 2022 Pontycymer has formed part of the three-member Garw Valley ward.

== See also ==
Category:People from Pontycymer
