= Loosestrife =

Loosestrife is a common name for plants within two different genera:

- Lythrum, a genus of 38 species of flowering plants in the family Lythraceae
- Lysimachia, a genus of 193 species of flowering plants in the family Primulaceae

== See also ==
- False loosestrife
