= River Llynfi =

Coordinates: 51°32′37″N 3°35′29″W

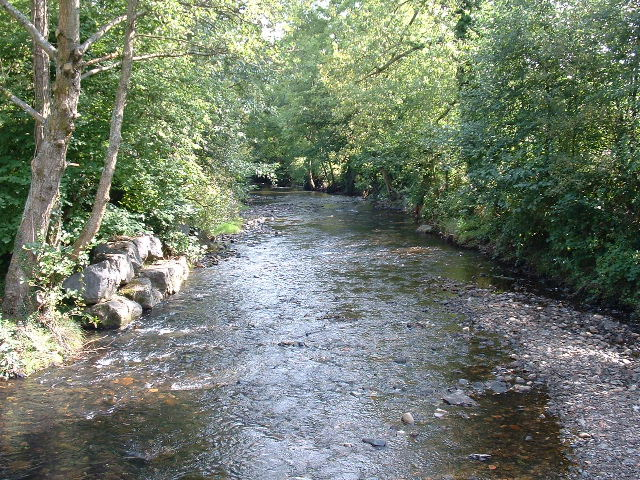
- River Llynfi. From the bridge at Pont Rhyd-y-cyff
- Native name: Afon Llynfi (Welsh)

Location
- Country: Wales
- Cities: Blackmill, Brynmenyn

Physical characteristics
- Source
  - location: Craig Ogwr
- Mouth
  - location: Aberkenfig

Basin features
- Tributaries
  - left: Nant Cwm-du, Nant Cedfyw
  - right: Nant Crynwydd, Nant Sychbant, Nant y Gadlys

The River Llynfi (Welsh: Afon Llynfi), is one of three main tributaries of the River Ogmore (Welsh: Afon Ogwr).

It runs for around 10 miles from its source north of Maesteg and flows generally southwards through the Llynfi Valley to the confluence with the River Ogmore and the River Garw at Aberkenfig. Its main tributaries are Nant Cwm-du and Nant Cedfyw which enter on its left bank and Nant Crynwydd, Nant Sychbant and Nant y Gadlys on its right bank.

The Llynfi has endured a long period of industrialisation and coal mining especially around Maesteg. There was an ironworks and brick works at Tondu.

Industrialisation and poor provision of sewerage led to severe water pollution of the river. In the second half of the 20th century, whilst the impact of coal mining diminished, new industries such as cosmetics and toiletries, paper making and sewage disposal continued to maintain the Llynfi in an almost abiotic condition. Strong enforcement action against a number of industries helped to ensure a steady improvement in quality into the 21st century.

- Map sources for: the source on Mynydd Caerau and confluence with the Ogmore.
