= River Garw =

River in Wales

Coordinates: 51°33′10″N 3°34′42″W

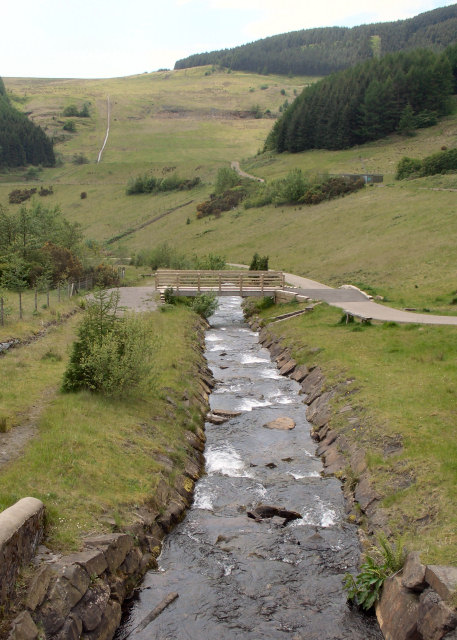
The Garw north of Blaengarw

The River Garw (Afon Garw in Welsh, meaning "rugged river") runs for about 12 miles from its source in the hills north of Blaengarw to the confluence with the River Ogmore and the River Llynfi at Aberkenfig. It is one of three main tributaries of the River Ogmore which runs through the town of Bridgend. It is in Wales, United Kingdom.

== Course ==
Originating in Blaengarw, it passes through the villages of Pontycymer, Pantygog, Lluest/Braichycymer, Tylagwyn, Llangeinor, Abergarw and finally the village of Brynmenyn, where it joins the River Ogmore.

== Tributaries ==
With most of the River Garw's course running along the floor of the river valley to which its name is given, it collects a number of tributary streams along the way. These streams are listed in order of confluence with the river from its uppermost point to its confluence with the River Ogmore.

- Nant Cwm Gwyn
- Ffynon Daren Goch
- Nant Cwm gweinen
- Cwm Nant Hir
- Nant Gelli Wern: This brook is best known in the local area for its small waterfall and now defunct reservoir above Pontycymers playing fields above Waun Bant.
- Nant Forch Wen: This brook is known in the local area mainly for both its longstanding crossing point at Forch Las consisting of two railway sleepers stretching between its banks alongside a ford that leads between Forch Las and the highest area of Pantygog, and for the fact that it once filled the village of Pontycymer's own swimming baths (since demolished) which were closed in the 1970s to 1980s due to the polio scare of that time.
- Nant Garw Fechan: Best known for the minor valley to which it gives its name. This valley and its river now form a picturesque nature reserve above the village of Braichycymer
- Nant Lwyn cria
- Nant Y Cwrdu
- Nant Felin arw
- Cae Garw Drehir

== Industrial Effects ==
The effects of coal mining in the valley, both from small family owned shafts and major pits alike, caused the river to become polluted and dirty with coal dust and other chemicals to the point at which it was once entirely black in colour, earning it the mainly local nickname of the "Black River".

== Wildlife ==
The River Garw once contained Salmon amongst other fish. Industrialisation of the valley resulted in their loss, but they are slowly being re-introduced as part of the valley's regeneration, after the closure of the coal mines in the 1980s and the recovery of the now useful shale through a brief period of restorative opencast mining in the 1990s.

It also runs through Bryngarw Country Park - a managed and publicly owned estate and nature reserve, where many types of birds can occasionally be seen.

== Flood Risks ==
During periods of prolonged heavy rain, the River Garw quite commonly bursts its shallow banks, causing minor flooding in all villages along its length. As the villages are mostly up on the valley sides, this doesn't have any significant effect, save for a few places; a house that once stood next to what is now a small footbridge across the river near the children's playground on the valley floor at Pantygog was demolished some years ago due to constant flooding from the river. The river has also been known to flood the playground area at Braichycymmer, and sometimes becomes hazardous near the Llangeinor playing fields/railway crossing, and in the lower regions of Bryngarw Country Park (where it has become less of a problem due to the deepening off the river bed to these ends). Its tributary streams, one of which joins at the boundary of Pontycymer and Pantygog, can turn from mere babbling brooks to raging torrents in a matter of a few minutes, and it is not unknown for this to occur very suddenly.

== Sewage ==
Dŵr Cymru Welsh Water's combined sewers overflow into the river, and in 2022 it was one of the most heavily used overflow for Welsh sewage. In that year alone, two pipes discharged 7,804 and 7,784 hours of sewage into the river, 325 days of the year.

== See also ==
- Garw Valley Railway
