= Handkerchief tree =

Handkerchief tree is a common name for several plants and may refer to:

- Davidia involucrata
- Maniltoa browneoides
