= Llangeinor =

Village in Bridgend, Wales

Coordinates: 51°34′N 3°34′W

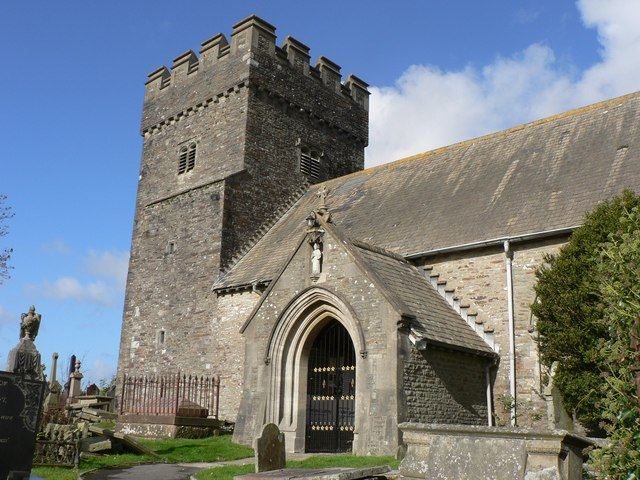
St Cein’s Church, Llangeinor

Llangeinor (Welsh: Llangeinwyr) is a small village (and community council electoral ward) located in the Garw Valley around 5 miles (8 km) north of Bridgend in Bridgend County Borough, Wales. The ward population taken at the 2011 census was 1,243. The entire village is now protected as part of a conservation area.

== Economy ==
IRVIN-GQ, part of Airborne Systems Group, makes parachutes for the military, near the junction of the A4093 with the main road A4064. GQ Parachutes had been formed in 1932.

== Governance ==
At the local level Llangeinor is an electoral ward to Garw Valley Community Council, electing two of the 13 community councillors.

Llangeinor was formerly also an electoral ward for Bridgend County Borough Council, from 1995 electing one county councillor. From 1995 to 2017, it was represented by the Labour Party . From 2004 to 2017, Labour county councillor, Marlene Thomas, represented the ward. In 2012, Thomas was elected Mayor of Bridgend County Borough and served until 2013. Since 2017, the Llangeinor ward has been represented by Cllr. Roz Stirman, who was elected as an independent councillor, but later defected to Plaid Cymru. A 2019 review of electoral wards in the borough by the Boundary Commission for Wales proposed merging Llangeinor with the southern part of the Pontycymmer ward to form a new ward called Lower Garw. This proposal was rejected, however, and Llangeinor has since 2022 formed part of the three-member Garw Valley ward.

== Transport ==
The A4064 road runs through the village; to the south this leads to Tondu, and to the north it heads to Pontycymer. The A4093 road starts in the village and heads east over the mountain to the Ogmore Valley. A disused railway runs through the village.

== Sport ==
Llangeinor AFC play in the Welsh Football League Second Division (as of 2008–09). Their ground is located to the west of the A4064 and river, and south-east of the railway level crossing, and just down the hill from by the main road in.

== Notable people ==
Llangeinor was the home of Richard Price (1723–1791), an internationally influential academic with notable contributions in the fields of moral philosophy, politics, theology and finance, as well as the mathematical subject of bayesian probability, having edited and published Thomas Bayes work.
