= Brynmenyn =

Coordinates: 51.552°N 3.576°W

- Location within Bridgend
- OS grid reference: SS 908 849
- Principal area: Bridgend
- Preserved county: Mid Glamorgan
- Country: Wales
- Sovereign state: United Kingdom
- Post town: Bridgend
- Postcode district: CF32
- Dialling code: 01656
- Police: South Wales
- Fire: South Wales
- Ambulance: Welsh
- UK Parliament: Bridgend
- Senedd Cymru – Welsh Parliament: Bridgend

Brynmenyn is a small village located at the confluence of the Garw and Ogmore rivers in south Wales, around 4 miles north of Bridgend, and it also in the Bridgend County Borough council area. The village has its own primary school.

== Transport ==
The A4065 road runs through the village; to the west this leads to Tondu, and to the east it heads to Abergarw and Bryncethin. The A4064 road starts in the village and heads north towards Llangeinor. A disused railway runs through the village, and the village formerly had a railway station. The nearest operational station is Tondu on the Maesteg Line.

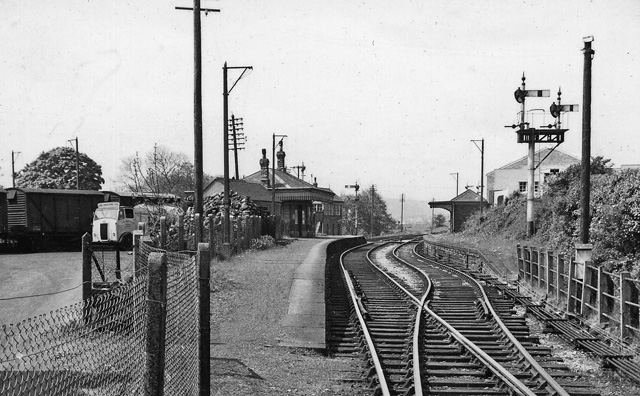
The former station in 1962

== Leisure ==
Bryngarw Country Park is situated on the north-western boundary of the village.

== Book ==
Memories of Sarah Jane Howell: A Welsh story of the greatest Heroine by Roger G K Penn. 'The story of Sarah Jane Howell, eldest daughter of George and Jennet Howell, Abergarw Farm, Brynmenyn. Sarah Jane was assistant mistress at Brynmenyn Council School who died, aged 21, in the Llynfi river near Bridgend whilst rescuing one of her pupils from drowning on the 19th of December 1911.' ISBN 978-0993131301 Published 2014
