= Garw Valley Railway =

Heritage railway in South Wales

Coordinates: 51.54580°N 3.59780°W

- Locale: Bridgend, Wales
- Terminus: Pontycymer and Brynmenyn
- Connections: Network Rail Tondu Station

Commercial operations
- Built by: Great Western Railway
- Original gauge: 4 ft 8 1/2 in (1,435 mm) standard gauge

Preserved operations
- Owned by: Bridgend Valleys Railway Company Limited
- Stations: 5 (currently not operational)
- Length: 5 miles (8.0 km)
- Preserved gauge: 4 ft 8 1/2 in (1,435 mm)

Commercial history
- Opened: 1876
- Closed: 6 March 1997

Preservation history
- 1988: Preservation group formed.
- 1994: Bridgend Valleys Railway Company incorporated.
- 23 March 2001: National Assembly for Wales Transport & Works Act order secured.
- Headquarters: Pontycymer Locomotive Works

The Garw Valley Railway is the trading name of the Bridgend Valleys Railway Company Limited. It operates a short section of 4 ft 8 1/2 in (1,435 mm) standard gauge railway located in South Wales, which is being recreated as a heritage railway. Formerly part of the Llynvi and Ogmore Railway (L&OR) and built by the Great Western Railway (GWR), the line was used for freight and passenger services, with most of the track still in place between Brynmenyn and Pontycymer. The project currently has a train shed at Pontycymer, and hopes to initially offer brake van rides between Pontycymer and Pant-y-Gog, a distance of 0.5 miles (0.8 km).

== History ==
The Duffryn Llynvi and Porthcawl Railway Company (DL&PRC) was authorised by the Duffryn Llynvi and Porthcawl Railway Act 1825 (6 Geo. 4. c. civ), running from Caerau Duffryn down the Llynvi Valley to Tondu, and then west to Porthcawl where it built a pier for trans-shipment of coal. Merging with the Bridgend Railway in 1834, built to 4 ft 8 1/2 in (1,435 mm) standard gauge the system centred on Tondu totalled 21 miles (34 km).

In 1845 the UK government authorised the building of the South Wales Main Line (SWML), which brought about the recreation of a new owning company for the existing DL&PRC system, the Llynvi Valley Railway (LVR), which agreed connection with the 7 ft 1/4 in (2,140 mm) Brunel gauge SWML at both Bridgend and Pyle.

Due to a dispute between the LVR and the owner of Tondu Ironworks, new independent railways were built to divert coal traffic to Cardiff: the Ogmore Valley Railway (OVR); and Ely Valley Extension Railway (EVER). Once the Llynvi and Ogmore Railways (Amalgamation) Act 1866 (29 & 30 Vict. c. cxx) was obtained, the LVR and the OVR merged to become the Llynvi and Ogmore Railway (L&OR), building both the new Tondu to Nantymoel railway as well as an extension to Porthcawl's harbour. The L&OR also became one of the first railways to add a third rail, hence enabling it to run both 4 ft 8 1/2 in (1,435 mm) standard gauge and 7 ft 1/4 in (2,140 mm) broad gauge trains on the same track.

From 1873, the Great Western Railway took over the running of the L&OR under a lease, on condition that it built a third railway originating from Tondu, from Brynmenyn to Blaengarw. The Garw Valley Line opened on 25 October 1876. Within 10 years of opening, four collieries and some associated drift mines were serviced by the Garw Valley line, producing and hence shipping 4,000 tonnes of coal per day. After the L&OR was absorbed into the GWR on 1 July 1883, the whole system became known as the Tondu Valley Lines Division. In 1906 the Glengarw Colliery opened, which by 1911 was producing 1000 tonnes of coal per day.

The main traffic was coal, but between 1887 and 1902 stations along the Garw were constructed at Llangeinor, Pontyrhyl, Pontycymer and Blaengarw. However, the only intense passenger service on the entire Tondu Valley Lines system were from Cardiff to Bridgend and Porthcawl. Passenger trains from Bridgend consisted of four portions: Abergwynfi (detached at Tondu); Garw (detached at Brynmenyn); and Gilfach Goch (detached at Blackmill); with the residual train continuing to Nantymoel. However, even pre-World War II, with the relative distances so short, motor bus services took large numbers of passenger away from the railway, resulting in cessation of most passenger services outside the dedicated coal miner trains from 1953.

=== Closure ===
The entire Tondu Valley Lines Division was closed from the mid-1980s, after the ending of the UK miners' strike (1984–85). The subsequent closure of the Ocean Colliery in December 1985, the Garw Valley’s last working mine, resulted in the last coal train running on the Garw in 1986. The three lines were initially kept in place, but eventually the Ogmore line was lifted. The Llynfi Valley branch to Maesteg was reopened to passengers in 1992.

The Garw was reopened in 1995, to allow a land reclamation system to operate economically. This effectively removed the track and associated earthworks for the last mile of the Garw Valley line into Blaengarw, hence now terminating the line at Pontycymer. The last train from the reclamation site ran on 6 March 1997, and a special charter passenger train, the "Garw Guru", ran on 7 April 1997. Network Rail severed the connection to Tondu at Brynmenyn Level Crossing, just south of Bryngarw Country Park, in 2007.

== Preservation ==
Bridgend Valleys Railway Society (BVRS) was formed in 1988, to create a UK national-level operational museum project, with a vision of offering a Welsh National Railway Centre at the Brynmenyn Industrial Estate, and an operational railway north to Pontycymer.

Groundwork Neath Port Talbot (the government body responsible to Bridgend County Borough Council for the regeneration of the Garw Valley) leased the trackbed from Network Rail for 125 years on the understanding that it found a companion railway company to oversee the 4 miles 56 chains of track from Pontycymer to Brynmenyn. The BVRS sought to establishment a single-track heritage railway. On 23 March 2001, the Welsh Assembly made its first order under the Transport and Works Act 1992, the Bridgend Valleys Railway Order 2001 (SI 2001/1295) in favour of the BVRS, and six days later Railtrack formally signed over the route to BVRS, which became known as the Bridgend Valleys Railway Company.

However, after the bridge over the river Ogmore was demolished, the project was re-established:

To re-create for present and future generations a typical South Wales Valleys branch line by providing a working museum atmosphere based principally upon the traditions of the Great Western Railway just prior to nationalisation

The project will also establish an archive of South Wales Valleys railways.

== Operations ==
After establishing a base and train shed at Pontycymer, where the archive is currently stored, the current focus is on building a new platform at Pontycymer.

In 2008 the project received a boost through the relocation of the Vale of Glamorgan Railway Society, which had been ejected from the Barry Tourist Railway by owners the Vale of Glamorgan Council, in favour of new operators Cambrian Transport. They are now working with the Bridgend Valleys Railway Company to rebuild the line.

In summer 2014, land works were commenced to establish a station at Pontycymmer. By spring 2015, the first 20 metres (66 ft) of platform had been completed. In 2016, work commenced on levelling and relaying the track that runs alongside the platform, with work continuing throughout 2016 and into 2017. On 20 August 2017 the shed lines were reconnected to the running line, thus allowing one of the company's Planet locos to be driven into the platform, thus being the first loco at Pontycymer Station for some 25 years.

== Future ==
After establishment of a station at Pontycymer, the company aims to relay 1 mile (1.6 km) of track south to Braich-y-cymer. Beyond this, it will require two bridge replacement projects to be completed, before access can be gained to establish a station at Llangeinor, and then onwards to Bryngarw Country Park, which will be the southernmost limit of operations in the medium term. In the long term, it is hoped to extend as far south as Tondu, on the Transport for Wales route between Bridgend and Maesteg.

== Stock ==
- Steam locomotives:
  - Robert Stephenson and Hawthorns 0-4-0ST 7705, built 1952. Originally used at the Ely Paper Mills, Cardiff, now owned by 7705 locomotive group.
  - Hunslet Austerity 0-6-0ST No.68070. Delivered new to the National Coal Board at Maesteg where it was given the name "Pamela".
- Diesel locomotives:
  - British Rail Class 108 BR Blue, former Barry Island Railway
  - Planet 0-4-0DH No 3890, built 1958
  - Planet 0-4-0DH No 4006, built 1963
- Rolling stock:
  - BR "Shark" class Brake van No DB993721 fitted with ballast ploughs
