= Bridgend County Borough Council =

Local government of Bridgend County Borough, Wales

Bridgend County Borough Council Cyngor Bwrdeistref Sirol Pen-y-bont ar Ogwr (Welsh)

Type
- Type: Principal council of Bridgend County Borough

History
- Founded: 1 April 1996

Leadership
- Mayor: Heidi Bennett, Labour since 13 May 2026
- Leader: John Spanswick, Labour since 15 May 2024
- Chief Executive: Jake Morgan since July 2025

Structure
- Seats: 51 councillors
- Graph of the party split among 51 seats.
- Political groups: Administration (25) Labour (25) Other parties (26) Conservative (1) Plaid Cymru (1) Restore (1) Independent (23)
- Length of term: 5 years

Elections
- Voting system: First-past-the-post
- Last election: 5 May 2022
- Next election: 6 May 2027

Meeting place
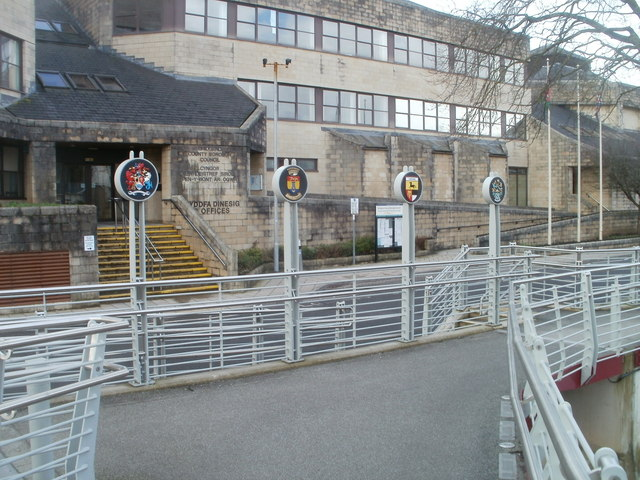
- Civic Offices, Angel Street, Bridgend, CF31 4WB

Website
- www.bridgend.gov.uk

Bridgend County Borough Council (Welsh: Cyngor Bwrdeistref Sirol Pen-y-bont ar Ogwr) is the local authority for the county borough of Bridgend, one of the principal areas of Wales.

== History ==
Bridgend County Borough and its council came into effect from 1 April 1996, following the Local Government (Wales) Act 1994. Bridgend County Borough Council largely replaced Ogwr Borough Council, though St Brides Major, Ewenny and Wick were transferred from Ogwr to the Vale of Glamorgan.

In November 2014 the council voted to propose a merger with the neighbouring Vale of Glamorgan Council, though this was rejected by the Welsh Government's Public Services Minister, Leighton Andrews, as not meeting the criteria to be able to proceed.

== Political control ==
The council has been under no overall control since June 2026, when a change of allegiance caused Labour to lose the majority it had won at the 2022 election. Labour remains the largest party and runs the council as a minority administration.

The first election to the council was held in 1995, initially operating as a shadow authority before coming into its powers on 1 April 1996. Political control of the council since 1996 has been as follows:

Party in control	Years
Labour	1996–2004
No overall control	2004–2012
Labour	2012–2017
No overall control	2017–2022
Labour	2022–2026
No overall control	2026–present

=== Leadership ===
The role of mayor is largely ceremonial in Bridgend, with political leadership instead provided by the leader of the council. The leaders since 1996 have been:

Councillor	Party	From	To
Jeff Jones	Labour	1 Apr 1996	Jun 2004
Cheryl Green	Liberal Democrats	Jun 2004	May 2008
Mel Nott	Labour	14 May 2008	5 Oct 2016
Huw David	Labour	5 Oct 2016	15 May 2024
John Spanswick	Labour	15 May 2024	

=== Composition ===
Following the 2022 election and subsequent by-elections and changes of allegiance up to June 2026, the composition of the council was:

Party	Seats
Labour	25
Conservative	1
Plaid Cymru	1
Restore	1
Independent	23
Total	51

Thirteen of the independent councillors form the "Bridgend County Independents" group. Plaid Cymru and seven of the independent councillors sit together as the "Democratic Alliance". The other three independent councillors do not belong to a group. The next election is due in 2027.

== Elections ==
Since 2012, elections take place every five years.

Year	Seats	Labour	Plaid Cymru	Liberal Democrats	Conservative	Others	Notes
1995	48	46	0	0	0	2	Labour majority control
1999	54	41	2	5	1	5	Labour majority control
2004	54	22	1	13	7	11	Liberal Democrat, Conservative, Independent coalition
2008	54	27	1	11	6	9	
2012	54	39	1	3	1	10	Labour majority control
2017	54	26	3	1	11	13	
2022	51	27	2	0	1	21	Labour majority control

Party with the most elected councillors in bold. Coalition agreements in notes column.

Prior to the May 2008 elections Bridgend Council was run by a coalition of Liberal Democrat, Conservative, Plaid Cymru and Independent councillors. After the election the leadership returned to the Labour Party, led by councillor Mel Nott.

The council elections on 5 May 2017 saw Labour lose its majority control of the council with, for example, three of the four Brackla seats being taken by the Conservatives from Labour. Keith Edwards and Ross Thomas, who'd been deselected by Labour for voting against the proposed local authority merger, won as independents in Maesteg.

In May 2022, Labour regained a majority and control of the council, though their majority was reduced following the Bridgend Central by-election on 11 August.

== Premises ==
The council is based at the Civic Offices on Angel Street in Bridgend, on the banks of the River Ogmore (Welsh: Afon Ogwr). The building was built in 1986 for the council's predecessor, Ogwr Borough Council.

== Electoral divisions ==
Pre-2022 electoral divisions in Bridgend County Borough

Prior to May 2022, the county borough was divided into 39 electoral wards.

Since the 2022 local elections the county borough has been divided into 28 electoral wards electing 51 councillors. Some communities also have their own elected council and community wards. The following table lists council wards, communities and associated community wards. Communities with a community council are indicated with a '*':

Ward	County councillors	Communities	Community wards
Aberkenfig	1	Llangynwyd Lower*	
Aberkenfig	1	Newcastle Higher* (part)	Aberkenfig
Blackmill	1	Ogmore Valley* (part)	Blackmill
Blackmill	1	Ogmore Valley* (part)	Evanstown
Brackla East and Coychurch Lower	2	Brackla* (part)	Brackla East
Brackla East and Coychurch Lower	2	Coychurch Lower*	
Brackla East Central	1	Brackla* (part)	Brackla East Central
Brackla West	1	Brackla* (part)	Brackla West
Brackla West Central	1	Brackla* (part)	Brackla West Central
Bridgend Central	3	Bridgend* (part)	Morfa
Bridgend Central	3	Bridgend* (part)	Newcastle
Bryntirion, Laleston and Merthyr Mawr	3	Merthyr Mawr*	
Bryntirion, Laleston and Merthyr Mawr	3	Laleston* (part)	Laleston/Bryntirion
Caerau	2	Maesteg* (part)	Caerau
Caerau	2	Maesteg* (part)	Nantyffyllon
Cefn Glas	2	Laleston* (part)	Cefn Glas 1
Cefn Glas	2	Laleston* (part)	Cefn Glas 2
Coity Higher	3	Coity Higher*	Coity
Coity Higher	3	Coity Higher*	Litchard
Coity Higher	3	Coity Higher*	Pendre
Cornelly ^{c}	2	Cornelly*	
Garw Valley	3	Garw Valley*	Bettws
Garw Valley	3	Garw Valley*	Blaengarw
Garw Valley	3	Garw Valley*	Llangeinor
Garw Valley	3	Garw Valley*	Pontycymmer
Llangynwyd	1	Llangynwyd Middle*	
Maesteg East	2	Maesteg* (part)	Maesteg East
Maesteg West	2	Maesteg* (part)	Maesteg West
Nant-y-Moel	1	Ogmore Valley* (part)	Nant-y-Moel
Newton	1	Porthcawl Town* (part)	Newton
Nottage	1	Porthcawl Town* (part)	Nottage
Ogmore Vale	1	Ogmore Valley* (part)	Ogmore Vale
Oldcastle	2	Bridgend Town* (part)	Oldcastle
Pencoed and Penprysg	3	Coychurch Higher*	
Pencoed and Penprysg	3	Pencoed*	Felindre
Pencoed and Penprysg	3	Pencoed*	Hendre
Pencoed and Penprysg	3	Pencoed*	Penprysg
Pen-y-fai	1	Newcastle Higher* (part)	Pen-y-fai
Porthcawl East Central	2	Porthcawl Town* (part)	East Central
Porthcawl West Central	1	Porthcawl Town* (part)	West Central
Pyle, Kenfig Hill and Cefn Cribwr	3	Cefn Cribwr*	
Pyle, Kenfig Hill and Cefn Cribwr	3	Pyle*	
Rest Bay	1	Porthcawl Town* (part)	Rest Bay
St Bride's Minor and Ynysawdre	3	St Bride's Minor*	Bryncethin
St Bride's Minor and Ynysawdre	3	St Bride's Minor*	Bryncoch
St Bride's Minor and Ynysawdre	3	St Bride's Minor*	Sarn
St Bride's Minor and Ynysawdre	3	Ynysawdre*	Tondu
St Bride's Minor and Ynysawdre	3	Ynysawdre*	Brynmenyn

* = Communities which elect a community council

== Arms ==
Coat of arms of Bridgend County Borough Council

Notes
Originally granted to Ogwr Borough Council on 21 December 1977.
Crest
On a wreath Or and Gules a demi dragon Gules gorged with a steel collar pendent therefrom a steel chain Proper holding in the dexter claw an anchor Azure and resting the sinister claw on a cogwheel Sable.
Escutcheon
Per chevron raguly per pale Or and Gules and Argent in chief on the dexter a lozenge Sable and on the sinister a garb Or and in base three barrulets wavy Azure thereon a dolphin naiant embowed Proper.
Supporters
On the dexter a dragon Gules gorged with a mural crown Or attached thereto a steel chain reflexed over the back Proper attached to a triangular harrow Or supported by the dexter claw and on the sinister a sea horse Argent the tail Vert gorged with a mural crown Or attached thereto a steel chain reflexed over the back Proper attached to an anchor Sable supported by the sinister webbed foot.
Motto
Onward With Confidence

== See also ==
- Ogwr Borough Council
