= Morfa, Bridgend =

Coordinates: 51.513°N 3.578°W

Morfa
- Electoral ward
- Population: 4,692 (2011 census)
- Principal area: Bridgend County Borough
- Country: Wales
- Sovereign state: United Kingdom
- Post town: BRIDGEND
- Postcode district: CF31
- Dialling code: 01656
- UK Parliament: Bridgend
- Senedd Cymru – Welsh Parliament: Bridgend
- Councillors: 6 (Town Council)

Morfa is an electoral ward in the town of Bridgend, Wales. The ward elects councillors to Bridgend Town Council and, until 2022, Bridgend County Borough Council.

== Description ==
The Morfa ward is bounded by the River Ogmore to the west, Brackla Street (and part of Bridgend town centre) in the south and the line of the old railway to the east. It includes Bridgend railway station in the south and Wildmill railway station in the north. The ward covers the Wildmill housing estate.

According to the 2011 UK Census the population of the ward was 4,692 (with 3,774 aged 18 or over).

Morfa is one of three wards (with Oldcastle and Newcastle) to Bridgend Town Council, and elects up to six of the nineteen town councillors.

Morfa was also a county ward to Bridgend County Borough Council, electing two county councillors. The ward was represented mainly by the Labour Party, but also the Liberal Democrats between 2004 and 2012. Peter Foley represented the ward as a Labour, Liberal Democrat and, lately, an independent councillor.

A review of the electoral wards of the county borough was launched in January 2019, including the proposal that the Morfa ward and the neighbouring Newcastle ward be merged to form a new three-councillor ward of Bridgend Central. The change took effect from the 2022 local elections.
