= Rhondda Cynon Taf =

County borough in Wales

Rhondda Cynon Taf County Borough Bwrdeistref Sirol Rhondda Cynon Taf (Welsh)
- County borough
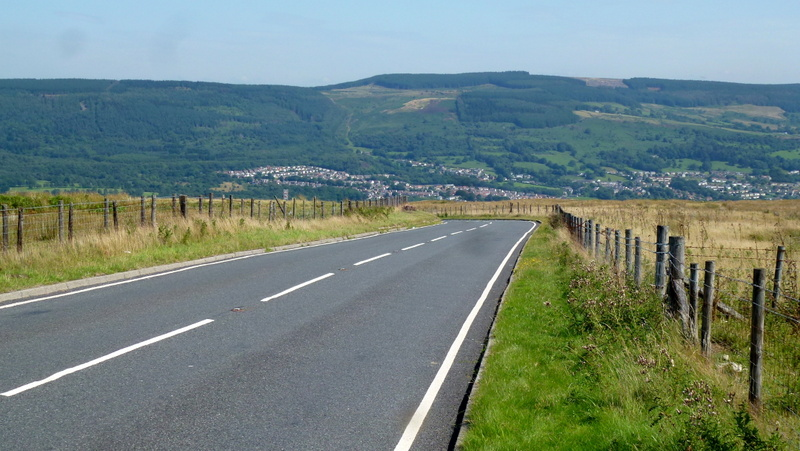
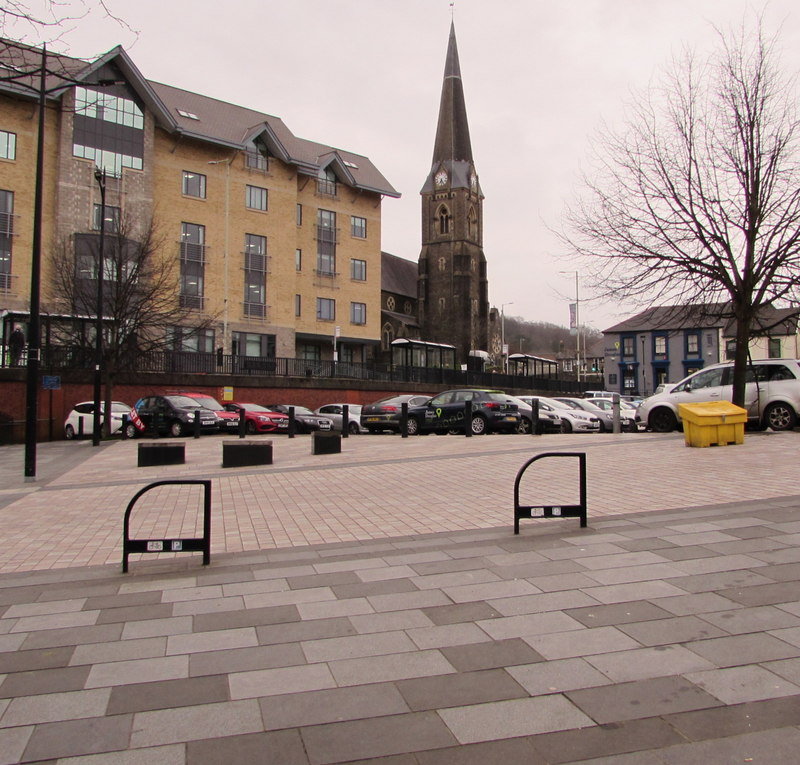
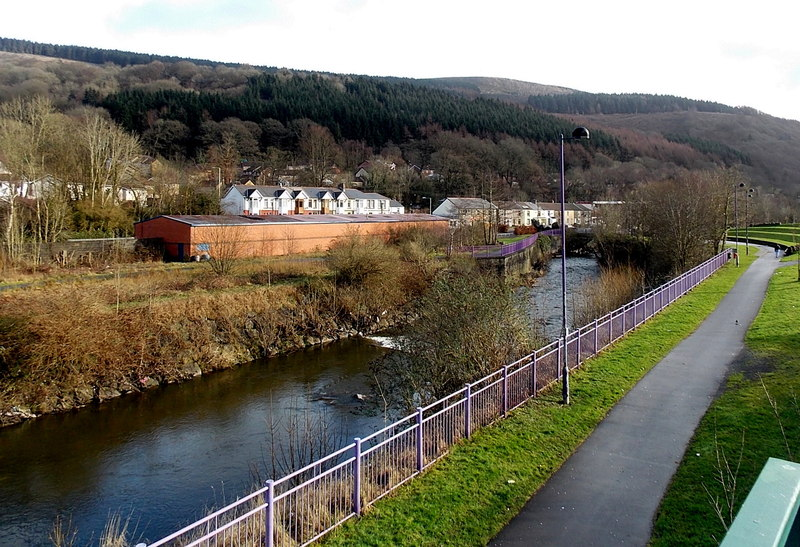
- Clockwise from top: Maerdy Mountain near Maerdy, Riverside path in Mountain Ash, and St Catherine's Church in Pontypridd

- Coat of arms
- Motto: Latin: Adsumus Ut Adiuvemus, lit. 'we are here to help'
- Rhondda Cynon Taf shown within Wales
- Coordinates: 51°39′10″N 03°26′00″W
- Sovereign state: United Kingdom
- Country: Wales
- Preserved county: Mid Glamorgan
- Incorporated: 1 April 1996
- Administrative HQ: Pontypridd

Government
  - Type: Principal council
  - Body: Rhondda Cynon Taf County Borough Council
  - Control: Labour
  - MPs: 5 MPs: Alex Barros-Curtis (L); Chris Bryant (L); Alex Davies-Jones (L); Gerald Jones (L); Anna McMorrin (L)
  - MSs: 24 MSs: 6 in Afan Ogwr Rhondda; 6 in Caerdydd Ffynnon Taf; 6 in Caerdydd Penarth; 6 in Pontypridd Cynon Merthyr

Area
  - Total: 164 sq mi (424 km^{2})
  - Rank: 13th

Population (2024)
  - Total: 242,844
  - Rank: 3rd
  - Density: 1,480/sq mi (573/km^{2})
- Time zone: UTC+0 (GMT)
  - Summer (DST): UTC+1 (BST)
- Postcode areas: CF
- Dialling codes: 01443
- ISO 3166 code: GB-RCT
- GSS code: W06000016
- Website: rctcbc.gov.uk

Rhondda Cynon Taf (Welsh pronunciation: [ˈr̥ɔnða ˈkənɔn ˈtaːv]; RhCT; also spelt as Rhondda Cynon Taff) is a county borough in the south-east of Wales. It consists of five valleys: the Rhondda Fawr, Rhondda Fach, Cynon, Taff (Welsh: Taf) and Ely valleys, plus several towns and villages away from the valleys.

Results from the 2011 census showed 19.1% of its 234,410 residents self-identified as having some ability in the use of the Welsh language. The county borough borders Merthyr Tydfil County Borough and Caerphilly County Borough to the east, Cardiff and the Vale of Glamorgan to the south, Bridgend County Borough and Neath Port Talbot to the west and Powys to the north. Its principal towns are - Aberdare, Llantrisant with Talbot Green and Pontypridd, with other key settlements/towns being - Pontyclun,Maerdy, Ferndale, Hirwaun, Llanharan, Mountain Ash, Porth, Tonypandy, Tonyrefail and Treorchy.

The most populous individual town in Rhondda Cynon Taf is Aberdare (Welsh: Aberdâr) with a population of 39,550 (2011), followed by Pontypridd with 32,694 (2011). The largest built-up area as defined by the Office for National Statistics is the Tonypandy built-up area, with a population of 62,545 (2011), which covers much of the Rhondda valley. The National Eisteddfod was held in Pontypridd, Rhondda Cynon Taf in 2024, postponed twice from 2022.

== History ==
The county borough was formed on 1 April 1996 under the Local Government (Wales) Act 1994, by the merger of the former Mid Glamorgan districts of Rhondda, Cynon Valley and Taff-Ely (with the exceptions of Creigiau and Pentyrch, which were added to Cardiff). Its name reflects all these, and thus also the rivers Rhondda, Cynon and Taff. Pontypridd, a university and market town, is the principal town of Rhondda Cynon Taf; situated 12 miles (19 km) north of the capital city of Cardiff. Pontypridd is often abbreviated Ponty by local residents.

The new county borough was described in the 1994 Act with different spellings in English and Welsh: Rhondda Cynon Taff (English) / Rhondda Cynon Taf (Welsh). In 1999, the council officially changed the borough's English language name to Rhondda Cynon Taf, allowing the same spelling to be used in both languages.

Some of Wales' most notorious unsolved murders occurred in Rhondda Cynon Taf in 1993, the murders of Harry and Megan Tooze in Llanharry.

== Industry ==
The district developed from the discovery and mining, primarily for export, of high-quality Welsh coals, such as steam coal, via Cardiff and Barry docks. The landscape was dominated by coal waste heaps and deep mine pit-heads. Many of the roads are lined with semi-ribbon development of closely packed Victorian terraces of houses which have given the Rhondda and Cynon valleys their distinctive appearance. In the nineteenth century the Rhondda had over 60 mines.

As deep mines closed, a number of very large open-cast coal mines were created and remain in operation, especially towards the north of the area.

The Welsh Development Agency, which was formed in 1976 to help reverse the economic down-turn in Wales caused by the recession in both the coal and steel industries, was very active in the Rhondda Cynon Taf area in supporting and encouraging industrial and commercial regeneration. Recent investment in the area has included the Dragon International Film Studios, on the site of Llanilid open-cast mine. The location of the project has led it to become known locally as "Valleywood", even though the Welsh valleys are some miles away.

== Environment ==
Wildfires on the hillsides of the Valleys.

The coal industry has had major adverse impacts on the quality of the environment, such that most of the rivers were severely polluted to the exclusion of all fish life. Recent decades have shown great improvement with the return of salmon recorded in the River Taff and the River Rhondda but the continued presence of man-made obstacles in the rivers is inhibiting regeneration of their pre-industrial numbers and condition.

The chemical industry has also had adverse effects due to the dumping of toxic waste in the now disused Brofiscin Quarry in the village of Groes-faen. Dumping took place over a 6-year period between 1965 and 1970 by the Monsanto Company. Clean-up costs have been estimated to be over £100 million. A Dr Papageorge, formerly Monsanto's chief scientist, estimates that between 60,000 and 80,000 tonnes of polychlorinated biphenyl (PCB) contaminated wastes were dumped there. Works costing £1.25 million to reduce health risks to local residents and members of the public using a nearby footpath were completed at the quarry in 2012. Monsanto, BP and Veolia contributed to the cost of the clean-up while continuing to deny liability.

== Government ==
The five UK parliament constituencies covering Rhondda Cynon Taf (in pink). 1 = Merthyr Tydfil and Aberdare, 2 = Rhondda and Ogmore, 3 = Pontypridd, 4 = Cardiff West, and 5 = Cardiff North.

The area is governed by Rhondda Cynon Taf County Borough Council from headquarters in Pontypridd and is the host authority to the South East Wales Improvement Collaborative (SEWIC), Excellence Wales award winner 2010. There are four constituencies represented in the Senedd (Welsh Parliament). Since 2024, Rhondda Cynon Taf is in five UK Parliament constituencies, Merthyr Tydfil and Aberdare, Rhondda and Ogmore, Pontypridd, Cardiff West, and Cardiff North. Since 2026, the county borough is covered by four Senedd constituencies, who each elected six members of the Senedd to the Senedd, with the four constituencies being; Afan Ogwr Rhondda, Caerdydd Ffynnon Taf, Caerdydd Penarth and Pontypridd Cynon Merthyr.

== Notable people ==
- Sir Tom Jones — Treforest, Pontypridd — singer, known to some people locally by his birth name of Tommy Woodward
- Neil Jenkins — Church Village, near Pontypridd — Wales and British & Irish Lions rugby union player
- Kelly Jones — Cwmaman — lead singer and lead guitarist of the rock band the Stereophonics
- Baron Merlyn Rees (1920–2006) — Cilfynydd, near Pontypridd — served as Secretary of State for Northern Ireland (1974–1976) and Home Secretary (1976–1979)
- Sir Geraint Evans (1922–1992) — Cilfynydd, near Pontypridd — bass-baritone opera singer

== Twinning ==
Towns that have twinning arrangements in Rhondda Cynon Taf are:

- Pontypridd: Nürtingen, Baden-Württemberg, Germany
- Aberdare: Ravensburg, Baden-Württemberg, Germany
- Llantrisant: Crecy-en-Ponthieu, Picardy, France

== Freedom of the Borough ==
The following people and military units have received the Freedom of the Borough of Rhondda Cynon Taf.

=== Individuals ===
- Stuart Burrows: 31 January 2008.
- Elaine Morgan: 10 April 2013.
- Alderman Mark Harcombe BEM, JP: December 1955 (First recipient of the Freedom): December 1955

=== Military units ===
- The Royal Welsh: 2010.
- The Welsh Guards: 15 May 2013.
- MOD St Athan: 2 June 2018.

== Demographics ==
=== Ethnicity ===
As of the 2021 United Kingdom census, the county borough's ethnic groups are as follows:

Ethnic group	Percentage
White	96.7%
Asian	1.5%
Mixed	1.0%
Black	0.4%
Other	0.3%

=== Religion ===
As of the 2021 United Kingdom census, the county borough's religious make-up is as follows:

Religion	Percentage
No religion	56.2%
Christianity	36.4%
Islam	0.6%
Other	0.5%
Buddhism	0.2%
Hinduism	0.2%
Sikhism	0.1%
Judaism	0.1%
Not stated	5.8%

== Places of interest ==
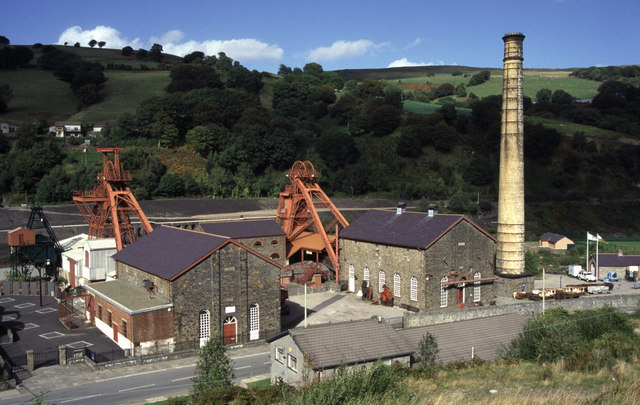
Rhondda Heritage Park

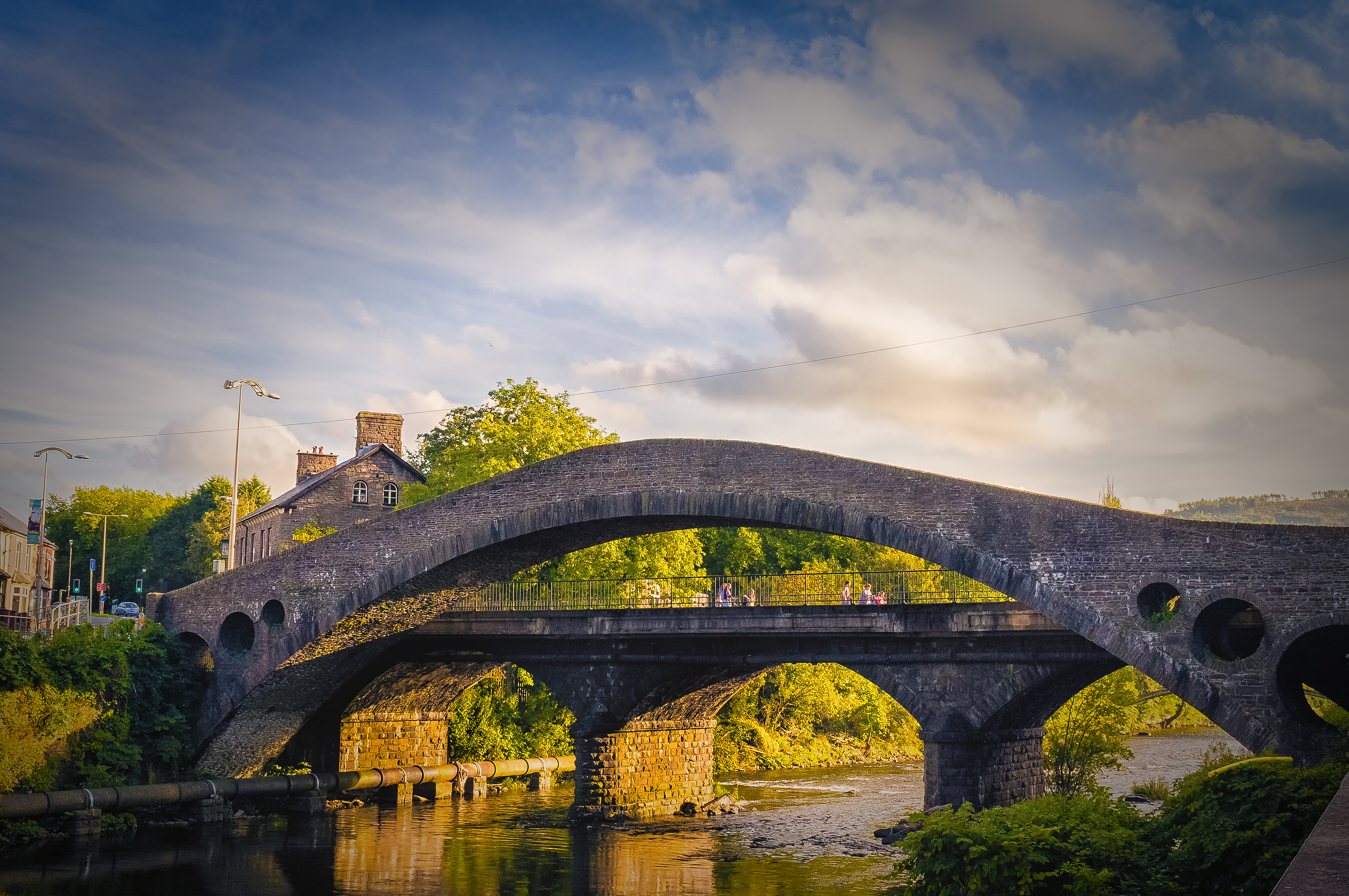
Old Bridge, Pontypridd

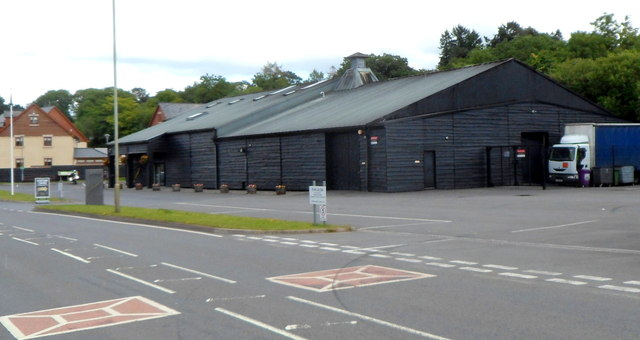
Penderyn Distillery

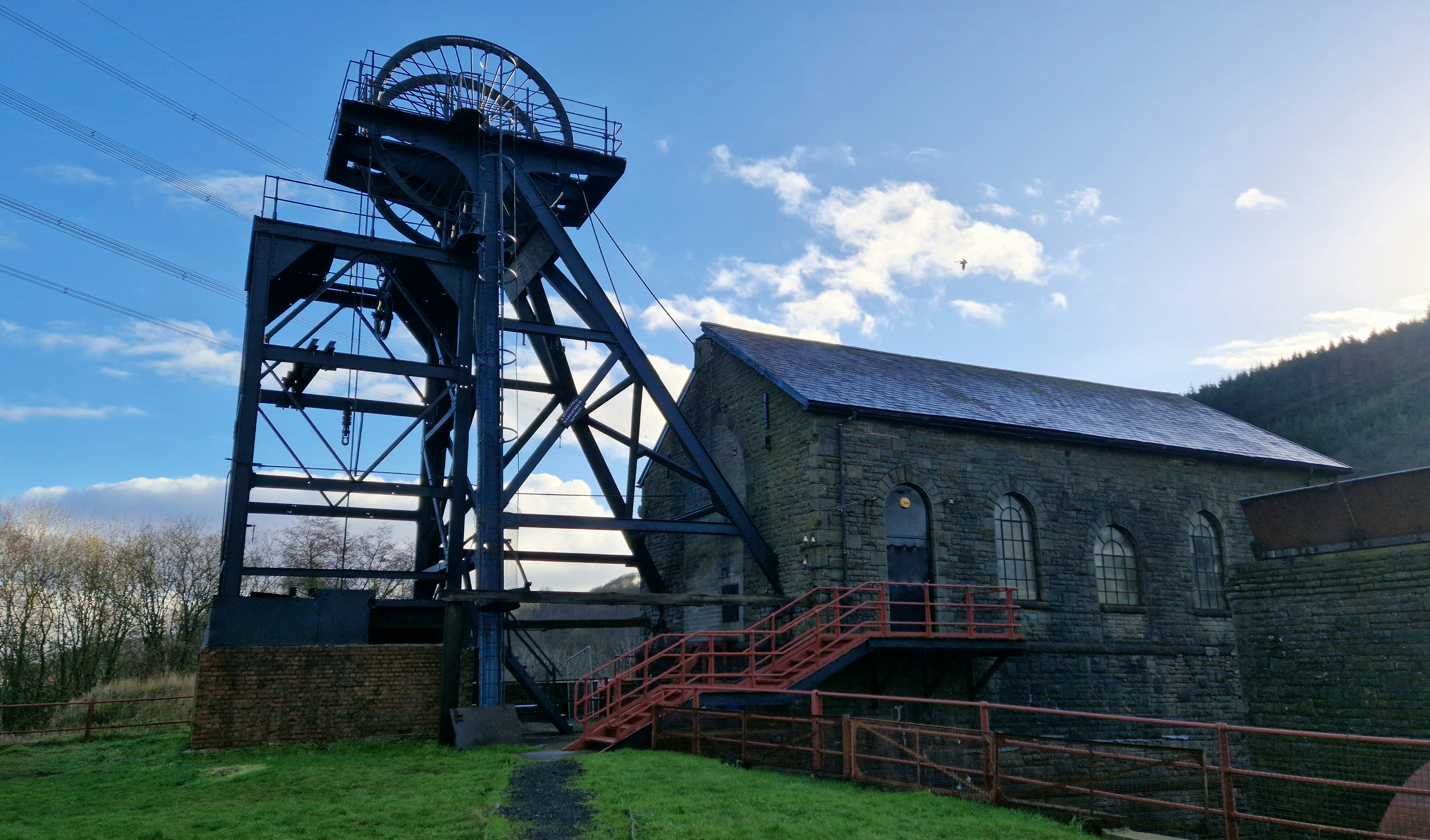
Great Western Colliery scheduled monument
- Rhondda Heritage Park is a mining heritage museum located in Trehafod, built on the site of the former Lewis Merthyr Colliery. Visitors can experience life as a coal miner through guided underground tours led by former colliery workers, exploring the mine shafts, engine houses and lamp room of what was once one of the world's most important coal mining areas.
- Old Bridge, Pontypridd is a single-span stone arch bridge built by William Edwards and completed in 1756. At the time of construction, it was the longest single-span bridge in the world at 140 feet, surpassing Venice's Rialto Bridge. The bridge features distinctive circular holes to reduce weight and is now a Grade I listed structure used as a footbridge.
- Parc and Dare Hall in Treorchy is a Grade II listed former miners' institute built in 1892 and extended with a theatre in 1913, funded by workers from the Park and Dare collieries. Now the largest miners' hall in the South Wales Coalfield, it serves as home to the world-famous Treorchy Male Voice Choir and hosts cinema, theatre and community events.
- Royal Mint Experience in Llantrisant is the only place in the world where visitors can see UK coins being made. The guided factory tours show the coin production process, whilst the interactive exhibition covers over 1,100 years of minting history, including rare coins such as the 1933 penny and Olympic medals from London 2012.
- Dare Valley Country Park near Aberdare is a large country park featuring lakes, woodland walks, mountain biking trails, and adventure activities. The park also houses the Gravity Family Bike Park with purpose-built trails for all skill levels, making it a popular destination for outdoor enthusiasts.
- Nantgarw China Works Museum showcases the site where William Billingsley created what was considered the world's finest porcelain in the early 19th century. The museum displays examples of the renowned Nantgarw china alongside ceramic workshops and exhibitions about the area's industrial heritage.
- Penderyn Distillery near Aberdare is Wales's most famous single malt whisky distillery and the largest producer of Welsh whisky. Located close to the Brecon Beacons National Park, it offers tours showing the whisky-making process and tastings of spirits that are now exported to over 40 countries worldwide.
- Great Western Colliery, which included the shaft known as the Hetty Pit, was a coal mine located at Hopkinstown, near Pontypridd, Glamorgan in South Wales. Operating from 1851 to 1983, the mine was the site of a major disaster in 1893 that killed 63 miners. The surviving structures, including the headframe and winding engine house, are now protected as a scheduled monument with several buildings holding listed building status.
