= Blackmill railway station =

Disused railway station in Blackmill, Bridgend County Borough Council

Blackmill
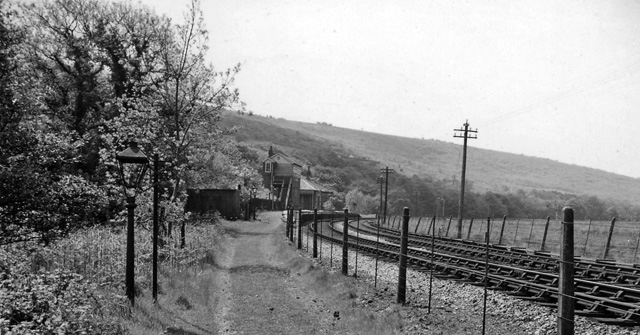
- The site of the station, looking southwest towards Tondu in 1962

General information
- Location: Blackmill, Glamorgan County Council; Wales
- Coordinates: 51.5663°N 3.5423°W
- Grid reference: SS932864
- Platforms: 2

Other information
- Status: Disused

History
- Original company: Llynvi and Ogmore Railway
- Pre-grouping: Great Western Railway
- Post-grouping: Great Western Railway

Key dates
- 12 May 1873: Opened
- 5 May 1958: Closed to passengers
- 27 March 1961: Closed to goods
Location

Blackmill railway station served the village of Blackmill, in the historical county of Glamorgan County Council, Wales, from 1873 to 1961 on the Ogmore Valley line.

== History ==
The station was opened on 12 May 1873 by the Llynvi and Ogmore Railway. It was also known as Black Mill in Bradshaw until 1896. The service to Gilfach Goch stopped on 22 September 1930 and the line, as well as the station, lost a lot of its traffic, thus the station closed to passengers on 5 May 1958 and closed to goods on 27 March 1961.

Preceding station	Disused railways	Following station
Lewistown Halt; Line and station closed	Llynvi and Ogmore Railway	Brynmenyn; Line and station closed
