= Wyndham, Bridgend =

Coordinates: 51.6116°N 3.5443°W

Wyndham
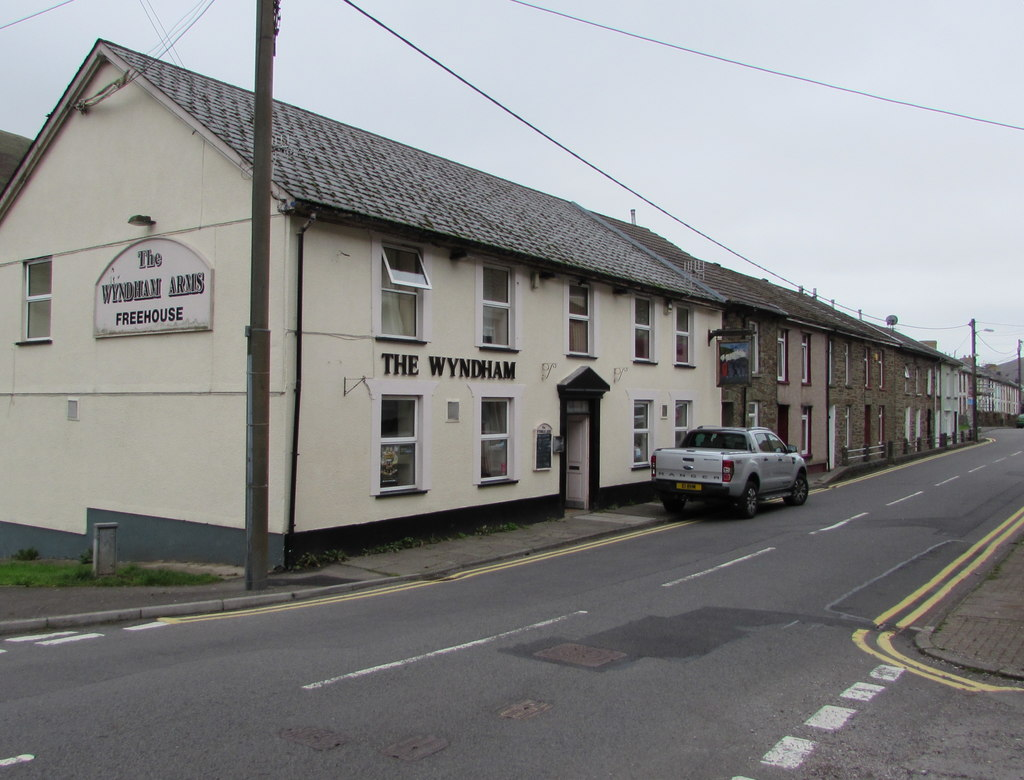
- The Wyndham Arms

- Location within Bridgend
- OS grid reference: SS931914
- Community: Ogmore Valley
- Principal area: Bridgend
- Preserved county: Mid Glamorgan
- Country: Wales
- Sovereign state: United Kingdom
- Post town: BRIDGEND
- Postcode district: CF32
- Dialling code: 01656
- Police: South Wales
- Fire: South Wales
- Ambulance: Welsh
- UK Parliament: Rhondda and Ogmore
- Senedd Cymru – Welsh Parliament: Bridgend

Wyndham is a small village in the County Borough of Bridgend, Wales built alongside the Ogwr Fawr tributary of the River Ogmore. The village is part of the community of the Ogmore Valley and is south of Nantymoel and north west of Ogmore Vale. The village grew out of the industrialisation of the valley in the 19th century, when coal mines were sunk in the area. The village is also nearby the local industrial estate Penllwyngwent in Ogmore Vale.

== Facilities ==
Notable buildings include the Georgian style Wyndham Arms Hotel. Built in 1792 as a coaching inn, it was later used as a jail, a courthouse, and a public house. It is now a Grade II Listed Building.

Wyndham has a convenience store called "Patel's Minimarket" near the main road. Opposite the convenience store is a youth club called the "Wyndham Boys and Girls Club" which has been open for nearly 80 years.

The nearest primary school is Ogmore Vale Primary School between Wyndham and Ogmore Vale. Wyndham's Christian church is St David's Church on Dunraven Place, run by Father Julien. The village has access to a cycle track along the route of the former Ogmore Valley Railway and has easy access the A4061. The Labour Party has held Wyndham for many years and is now led by Huw Irranca-Davies.
