= 2008 Bridgend County Borough Council election =

2008 Welsh local government election

Results of the 2008 Bridgend County Borough Council election

The 2008 Bridgend County Borough Council election took place on 1 May 2008 to elect members of Bridgend County Borough Council, the council of Bridgend County Borough in Wales. This was on the same day as the other 2008 United Kingdom local elections. The previous council election took place in 2004 and the following election was held in 2012.

In the election, the council remained under no overall control.

== Results ==
Party	Seats	Change
Labour	22	▲5
Liberal Democrats	11	▼2
Other	9	▼2
Conservative	6	▼1
Plaid Cymru	1	Steady

== See also ==
- 2008 Welsh local elections
