= Penprysg =

Residential area in Bridgend County Borough, Wales

Coordinates: 51.530°N 3.497°W

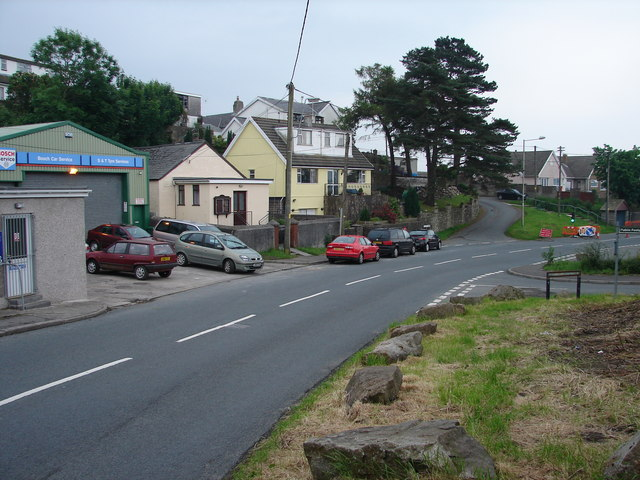
Penprysg Road, Penprysg

Penprysg is a residential area of the town of Pencoed in Bridgend County Borough, Wales. Located in the northern suburban district of Pencoed, it occupies a saddle where the town rises onto the sandstone ridge of Cefn Hirgoed, which extends about 5 km eastward from Kenfig Hill and reaches a height of 142 m on its central spine. The area evolved from ribbon development along Penprysg Road in the late nineteenth century and has since expanded through housing initiatives in the 1970s and post-2000 infill development, with the ward of Pencoed and Penprysg recording just over 10,000 residents in the 2021 Census.

== Governance ==
Penprysg is a community ward to Pencoed Town Council.

Penprysg was also the name of an electoral ward, which extended to the north of Pencoed.The Penprysg county electoral ward, since 1999, was represented by one county councillor on Bridgend County Borough Council. The ward covered the Penprysg community ward and the entire community of Coychurch Higher.

Effective from the 2022 local elections, Coychurch Higher was combined with the entire Pencoed community to create a new ward, named "Pencoed and Penprysg", electing three county borough councillors.

== Description ==
Penprysg is the northern suburban district of Pencoed in Bridgend County Borough, Wales, occupying the saddle where the town rises on to the sandstone ridge of Cefn Hirgoed. The ridge extends for about 5 km from Kenfig Hill eastwards to Penprysg and attains 142 m on its central spine; it is carved from the hard Cefn Cribbwr Rock of the South Wales Lower Coal Measures, whose dip-slope forms the village’s gently inclined streets. At the 2021 Census the ward of Pencoed and Penprysg recorded 10,011 usual residents in 4,284 households, giving a population density of 417 persons per square kilometre—one of the higher figures in rural Bridgend, because later estate building has filled most remaining pasture between Pencoed station and the M4 motorway.

The built-up area evolved from ribbon development along Penprysg Road above the original village nucleus beside the South Wales Main Line in the late nineteenth century. Housing was accelerated in the 1970s by the Heol-y-Groes and Hendre initiatives and again after 2000 when infill plots north of Wimborne Road were released. Community life centres on St David's Church (1915) on Penprysg Road, a coursed stone building with bellcote and canted porch that replaced an earlier corrugated-iron mission hall and now serves the Pedair Afon ministry area.

Penprysg's principal transport issue is the flat-crossing at Hendre Road, where barrier closures sever east–west traffic whenever trains pass. A 2022 WelTAG consultation by Bridgend County Borough Council and Network Rail proposed a new two-span bridge on Penprysg Road combined with closure of the level crossing and the creation of a traffic-free active-travel link beneath the railway; the scheme aims to remove congestion, improve bus reliability and future-proof rail frequency increases on the Cardiff–Swansea corridor. If approved, construction is expected to start later this decade, giving Penprysg grade-separated access to the A473 and to junction 35 of the M4.
