= Pricetown =

Pricetown may refer to:

In the United States

- Pricetown, Highland County, Ohio, an unincorporated community
- Pricetown, Trumbull County, Ohio, an unincorporated community in Mahoning and Trumbull counties
- Pricetown, Pennsylvania, an unincorporated community

Elsewhere

- Price Town, Ogmore Vale, Wales
