= Lewistown, Bridgend =

Village in Bridgend, Wales

Coordinates: 51°34′55″N 3°32′28″W

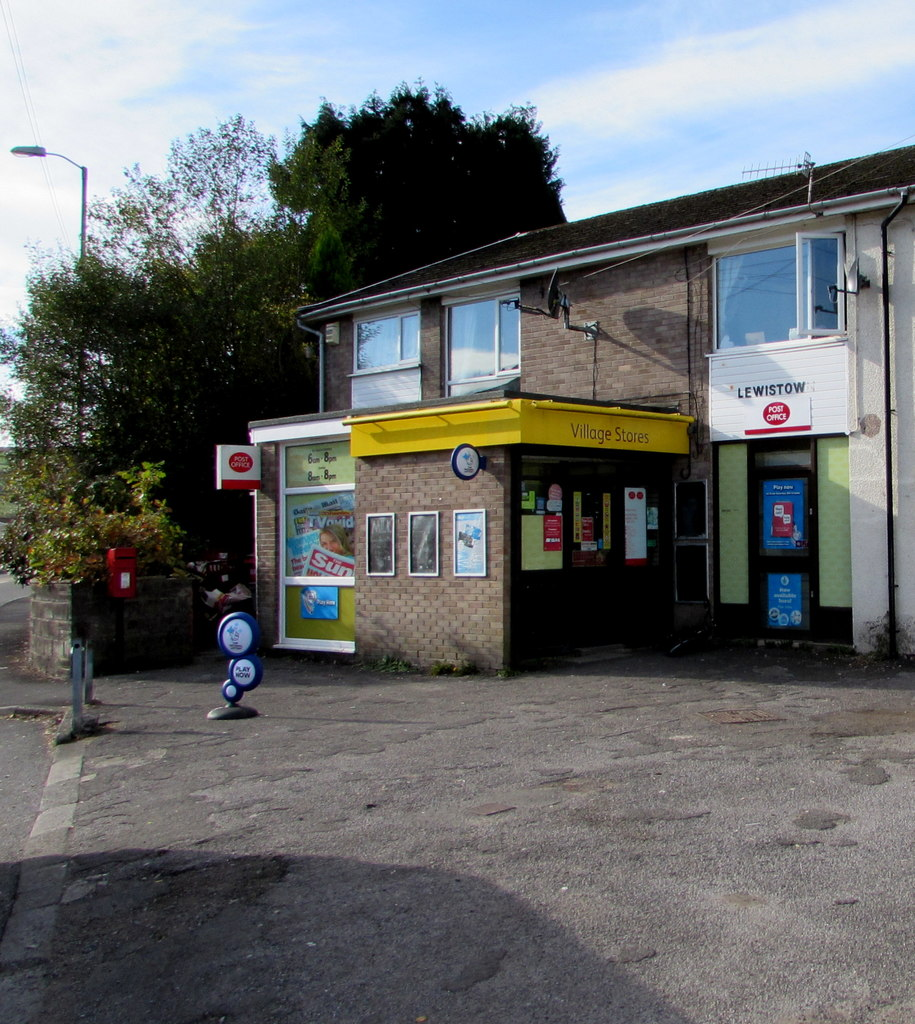
Lewistown Village Stores & Post Office, October 2018

Lewistown is a small village in South Wales. It lies between Ogmore Vale and Blackmill in the valley of the River Ogmore. It developed to service the local coal mines which have all now closed and it has become largely a commuter village for Bridgend and Maesteg. Strung out along the A4061 on the narrow floor of the upper Ogmore valley, Lewistown forms a continuous ribbon with the adjacent hamlets of Pant-yr-Awel and Glynogwr; the 2021 census classes them as a single built-up area with 790 usual residents, making it one of the smallest settlements in Bridgend County Borough.

The village sits roughly 10 km north of Bridgend and 5 km south of Ogmore Vale, its modest grid of terraced streets backed against the steep, afforested slopes of Mynydd yr Aber. Although the original nineteenth-century housing stock has been infilled by post-war bungalows and suburban cul-de-sacs, Lewistown retains a distinct valley-floor character: one main spine road, a cluster of convenience shops around the former post office, and bus links that feed commuters southwards to Bridgend and eastwards over the mountain to the Llynfi Valley. A string of short footpaths climbs from the high street onto forestry tracks, while National Cycle Network Route 883 running along the disused Ogmore Valley Railway beside the River Ogmore.

The settlement owes its existence to coal. Penllwyngwent Colliery—driven from the valley side immediately north-east of the present village in 1905—employed several hundred men and stimulated a wave of house-building that merged earlier wayside farms into a coherent industrial village. At its peak in the 1920s the pit produced high-quality steam coal from the Two-Feet-Nine and Lower New seams; wagons were dispatched south via the Ogmore Valley Railway, which added a rudimentary wooden platform, Lewistown Halt, during the Second World War to serve shift workers. When the National Coal Board closed Penllwyngwent on 28 February 1969 most miners transferred to the Wyndham/Western complex farther up-valley, and the railway had already shut. The colliery site has since been cleared for a small industrial estate, and—with coal gone—Lewistown has become a dormitory for Bridgend, Maesteg and, via the M4, Cardiff; yet its tightly packed terraces and mountainside outlook still evoke the self-contained colliery community that once powered this corner of the South Wales coalfield.
