= Newcastle, Bridgend =

Area and electoral ward of Bridgend, Wales

Coordinates: 51.508°N 3.585°W

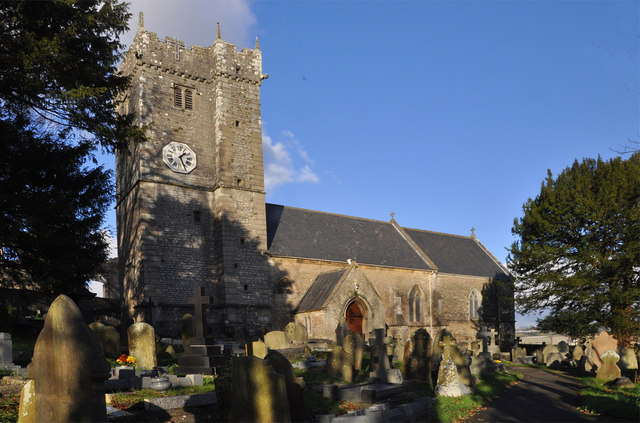
St Illtyd's parish church

Newcastle (Welsh: Y Castell Newydd) is an area and electoral ward of the town of Bridgend, Wales. The area includes the medieval Newcastle Castle. The ward elects councillors to Bridgend Town Council and Bridgend County Borough Council.

== Description ==
Newcastle is located immediately west of Bridgend town centre and either side of Park Street. The area includes Bridgend County Borough Council headquarters next to the River Ogmore.

On Newcastle Hill overlooking the town is Newcastle's parish church, St Illtyds, which is a Grade II* listed building originating in the 14th-century. The remains of Newcastle Castle are also at the top of Newcastle Hill, believed to date from 1106.

The area also includes Bridgend's rugby union stadium, the Brewery Field.

== Electoral ward ==
The Newcastle electoral ward is bounded by the River Ogmore to the east, Heol-y-Bardd in the south, St Illtyd's Road and Swn Cloch yr Eglwys to the north. As well as the Newcastle area it includes Brynhyfryd, Ystrad Fawr and Bryntirion Hill.

According to the 2011 UK Census the population of the ward was 5,421 (with 4,415 aged 18 or over).

Newcastle is one of three wards to Bridgend Town Council, electing up to seven of the nineteen town councillors.

Newcastle was also a county ward to Bridgend County Borough Council, electing two county councillors. Prior to 1996, Newcastle was a ward to Mid Glamorgan County Council and Ogwr Borough Council.

A review of the electoral wards of the county borough was launched in January 2019, including the proposal that the Newcastle ward and the neighbouring Morfa ward be merged to form a new three-councillor ward of Bridgend Central. This took effect from the 2022 local elections.
