= Nant-y-moel =

Human settlement in Bridgend County Borough, Wales

Coordinates: 51.624°N 03.540°W

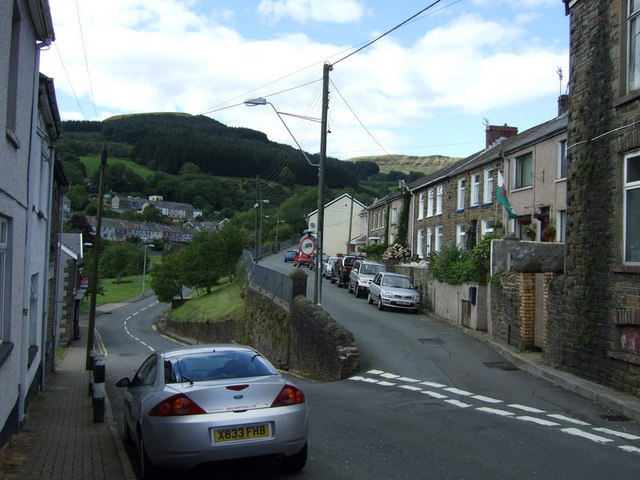
- Road junction in Nant-y-Moel.

- Location within Bridgend
- Population: 2,344 (2011)
- Community: Ogmore Valley
- Principal area: Bridgend
- Preserved county: Mid Glamorgan
- Country: Wales
- Sovereign state: United Kingdom
- Post town: BRIDGEND
- Postcode district: CF32
- Dialling code: 01656
- Police: South Wales
- Fire: South Wales
- Ambulance: Welsh
- UK Parliament: Rhondda and Ogmore
- Senedd Cymru – Welsh Parliament: Bridgend

Nant-y-moel or Nantymoel [nant ə mɔi̯l] (meaning "stream from the bare mountain") is a village and includes the formerly separate village of Pricetown in the county borough of Bridgend, Wales on the River Ogmore, and is one of the constituent villages of the Ogmore Valley. It is bordered by the village of Wyndham to the south and by the Bwlch y Clawdd mountain to the north.

== History ==
As with the rest of the Ogmore Valley, it was mainly a farming community up until the middle of the 19th century when coal mining became widespread across South Wales. The last coal mine (Wyndham/Western Colliery) closed in 1983, resulting in high unemployment at that time. Most residents today now travel to Bridgend or other larger towns for work. Part of the former colliery site is home to Aberfields (known locally as The Planka), which hosts a number of community sports and leisure activities. Since 19 August 2023 Aberfields has hosted a free, weekly 5 km parkrun.

== Politics ==
Nantymoel is the name of an electoral ward to Bridgend County Borough Council. Prior to 1996, Nantymoel was a ward to Ogwr Borough Council, electing one councillor.

== Transport ==
The A4061 road passes through the village and goes north over Bwlch y Clawdd where it links to Treorchy and the Rhondda Valley to the north and the A4107 that goes west. The Bwlch, and surrounding large hillsides, offers a far-reaching view of the surrounding countryside. On a clear day, it is possible to see South West England over the Bristol Channel to the south, and the Brecon Beacons mountain range to the north.

== Education ==
The primary school was one of the few in the whole valley that did not close in July 2003 and merge with the new Ogmore Primary School. It was refurbished in 2002 to combine with the nursery school that had previously closed.

== Notable people ==
- Lynn Davies, Olympic athlete.
- John Forrester-Clack, artist.
- Windsor Davies, actor.
