= A4061 road =

Mountain pass road in Wales

Coordinates: 51.62449°N 3.5391°W

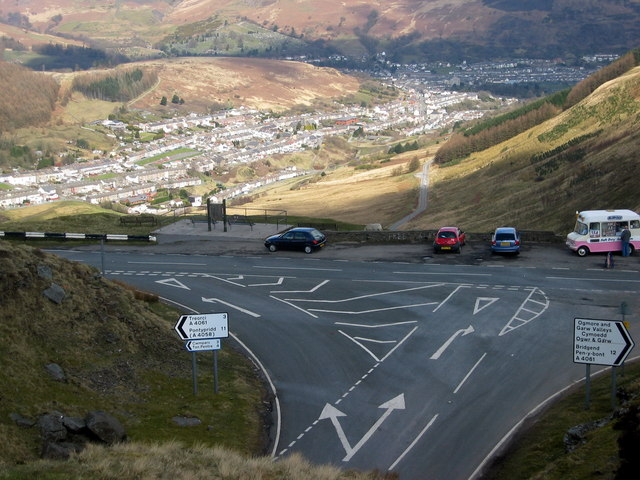
The A4061 at the Bwlch y Clawdd summit, overlooking Cwmparc, with an ice cream van in view

The A4061 is the main road linking Bridgend with Hirwaun via the Ogmore and Rhondda Valleys in South Wales. It is a mix of streets connecting former mining communities, and mountain passes built as relief work for unemployed miners.

The road was originally a dead-end from Bridgend along the Ogmore Valley built in the 19th century, but concerns over travel difficulties, environment and post-World War I unemployment in the Rhondda led to a series of mountain roads being planned. The road was initially extended over the Bwlch-y-Clawdd towards Treorchy in 1928. A further section, from Treherbert northward to Hirwaun, opened the following year. As well as improving communications and transport, the A4061 allowed locals to visit the mountain summits easily for leisure purposes. Ice cream vans have been a regular feature at the two summits, Bwlch-y-Clawdd and Rhigos, since the 1930s.

The A4061 has been praised for its engineering and scenery, including a feature in National Geographic, and formed part of the Olympic Torch route in the run-up to the 2012 London Olympics.

== Route ==
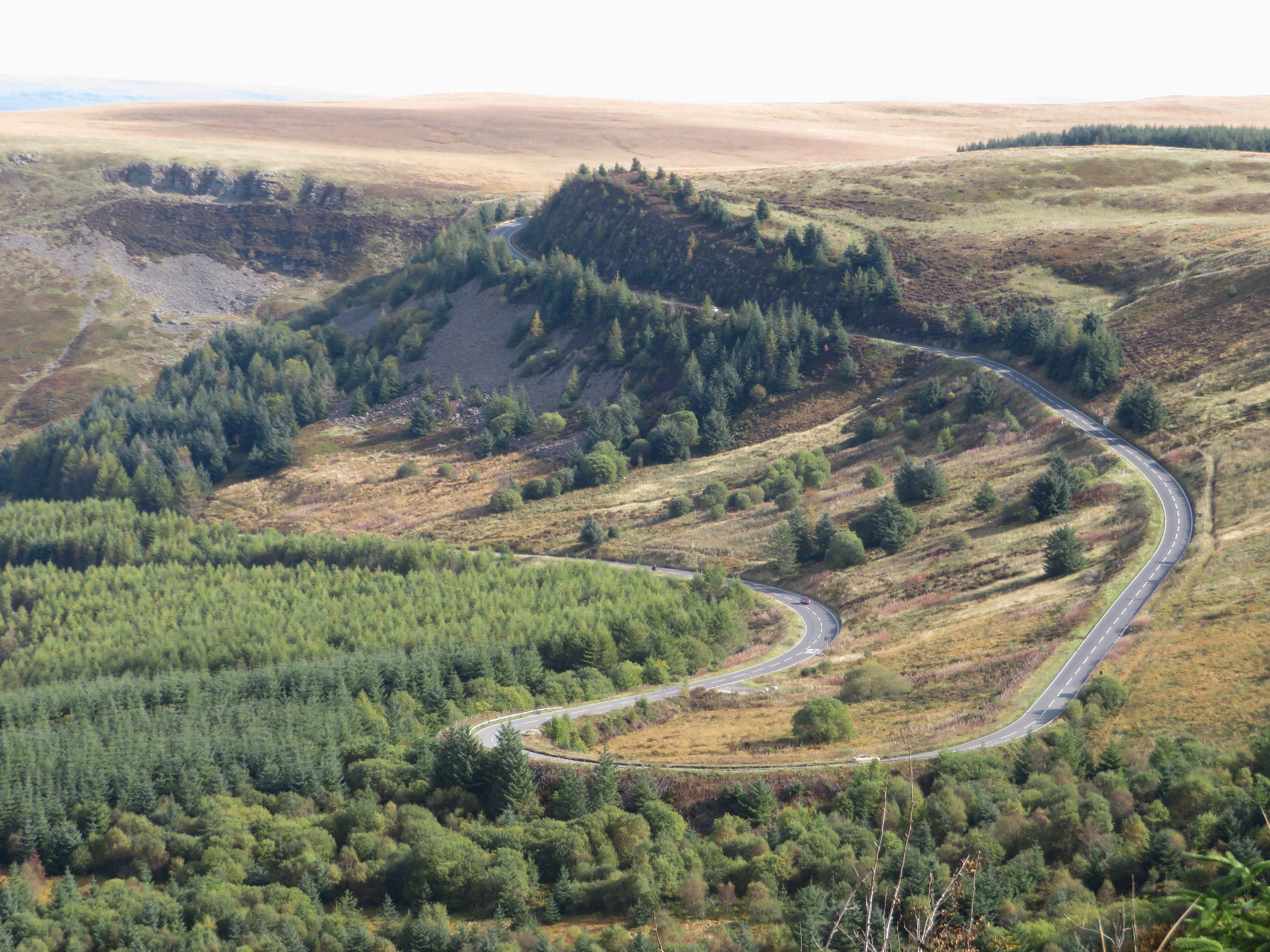
The Rhigos Road section of the A4061 has some significant hairpin bends

The A4061 is about 25 miles (40 km) from south to north, but its winding sections make it longer in road miles. It has four main sections, which from south to north are:

- the road through the Ogmore Valley,
- the Bwlch-y-Clawdd Road (also known as "the Bwlch"), reaching a summit of 1,476 feet (450 m) between the Ogmore and Rhondda Fawr valleys,
- the road through the Rhondda Fawr valley, and
- the Rhigos Road, with a summit of 1,381 feet (421 m) between the Rhondda Fawr valley and Rhigos in the Cynon Valley.

The road meets the M4 (the motorway that runs across South Wales) at Sarn Park services; it also meets the A4107 mountain road to Abergwynfi, the A4058 Rhondda Fawr valley road to Porth and Pontypridd and the Heads of the Valleys Road. The two mountain sections feature numerous hairpin bends, and the section along the Bwlch-y-Clawdd is sited on top of a perfect geological fault.

Settlements served by the road include (from south to north) Bridgend, Sarn, Bryncethin, Blackmill, Lewistown, Ogmore Vale, Price Town, Nantymoel, Treorchy, Ynyswen, Penyrenglyn, Treherbert and Hirwaun. The road also connects Bridgend, Treorchy, Ynyswen and Treherbert railway stations.

== History ==
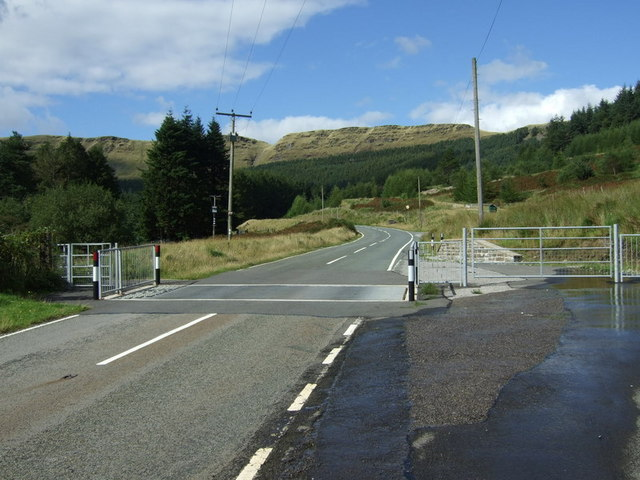
The start of the Bwlch-y-Clawdd Road in Nantymoel

=== Glamorgan Inter-Valley Road ===
The area was rural and sparsely populated until the mid 19th century, when the discovery of coal led to a major industrial boom. The geography of narrow river valleys sandwiched between mountains meant that land space was at a premium, with roads and railways running along limited land space. With relatively little sunlight reaching the valley floors, the local climate in the valleys was depressing. Visiting a town in a neighbouring valley, only a few miles away as the crow flies, could involve a 30-to-40-mile (50-to-65-kilometre) round trip. The A4061 was typical of this, and around 1900 it was a dead end road from Bridgend to Nantymoel, requiring a detour via the Ogwr Fach Valley and Tonyrefail to reach the Rhondda Valley.

The downturn of the coal mining industry after World War I hit the Rhondda particularly hard due to its isolation and lack of access, with high unemployment by the 1920s. In 1924 a series of new mountain roads, to connect isolated valleys, was proposed, including a new through route from Bridgend to Hirwaun via the Rhondda. As well as providing unemployment relief and connecting communities, Glamorgan County Council hoped the better access to the mountain summits would provide recreation, which Lord Temple described as "a playground for all time for those people". The Leader of the Opposition and Labour leader Ramsay MacDonald was particularly keen for the road to be built, knowing it would be good for local economy as well as communications, and he was keen to find ways of moving the economy of South Wales valleys away from the monoculture of coal mining. In addition to the A4061, the A4107 to Abergwnfi and a mountain road from Llyn Fawr to Maerdy in the Rhondda Fach valley were planned as part of the same project. The total estimated cost of the mountain roads, including neighbouring routes was around £400,000 (equivalent to £21,025,000 in 2025), of which 75% was to be paid by central Government and 25% by Glamorgan County Council.

William Jenkins campaigned for the A4061 to be completed.

The road schemes were designed by Ministry of Transport engineer and surveyor George Macpherson, with a standard planned width of 20 feet (6.1 m), with an additional 5 feet (1.5 m) on one side for pedestrians. The workforce was drawn largely from unemployed miners, and the mountain sections were quickly built. About halfway through construction, funding was withdrawn and work halted, though pressure in Parliament, particularly from MacDonald and Sir William Jenkins, ensured there would be a commitment to finish the road in 1928. By 1929, £356,431 (now 19,577,000) had been spent on constructing 32.29 miles (51.97 km) of new road (including the A4107 and all connecting links). The Bwlch-y-Clawdd section opened at the end of 1928, while the Rhigos Road section, from Treherbert to Hirwaun, delayed by financial constraints, opened on 4 November 1929. Herbert Morrison, Minister of Transport, visited the works in 1930 and was impressed by the progress and effort expended in the project. The link road from Llyn Fawr to Maerdy was never built.

=== Recent history ===
The landscape at the northern end of the A4061 has been extensively used for open cast mining, which remains an active industry.

In 2013, a large sink hole appeared on the Rhigos Mountain Road section. The road was shut for several days for repairs. In 2016, Rhondda Cynon Taf County Borough Council announced a £1.25 million resurfacing package for the A4061 between Treherbert and Hirwaun. The road was closed for three weeks while the council laid around 6,000 tonnes of tarmac. In August 2018, the Rhigos and Bwlch sections were both closed because of a burst water main and essential remedial works respectively.

== Landmarks ==
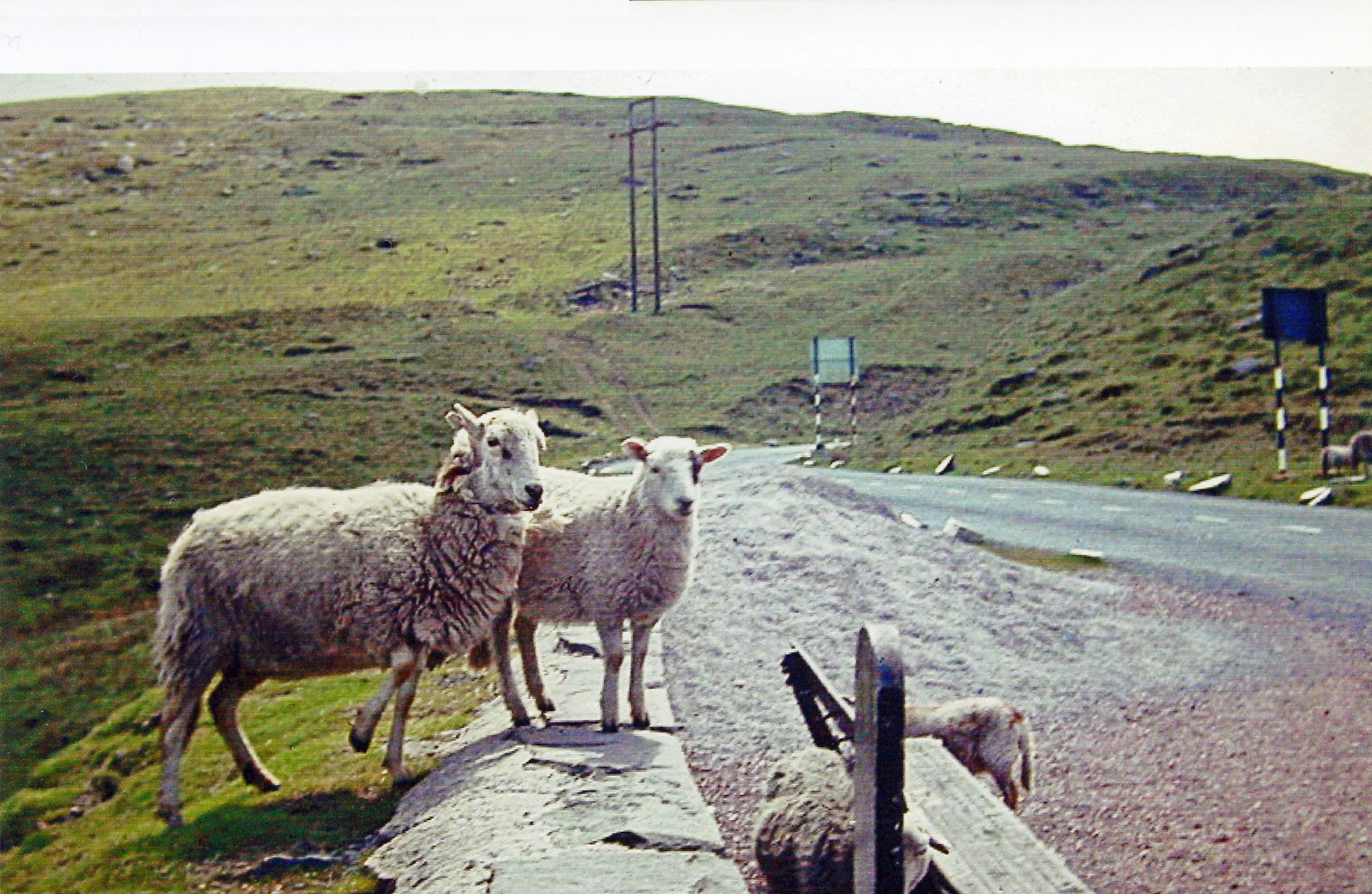
Sheep roaming by the A4061, at Bwlch-y-Clawdd, in 1962

The Paran Baptist Chapel was built at the junction of what is now the A4061 and A4093 at Blackmill. It was originally constructed in 1819, and expanded several times throughout the 19th century. It is now a Grade II listed building.

The Bwlch-y-Clawdd Road is well known for an ice cream van parked at the summit, with sheep regularly roaming the local area. Ice cream has a strong connection with the Rhondda following immigration to the valley by Italians during the 19th century, and the same family has been selling ice cream from the summit since the 1930s. In June 2001, National Geographic used a photograph of the summit as the centrepiece for an article on Wales.

== Legacy ==
The A4061 has been celebrated as one of the most ambitious road projects in Wales. Author Mike Parker has described the road as "the most famous of the miners' mountain passes." On a clear day it is possible to see the Bristol Channel, Exmoor and the Brecon Beacons from the summit. In 2006, a BBC News report described the road as the fifth bendiest in Britain.

In May 2012, as part of the preparation for the London Olympics, the Olympic torch was carried along the A4061 from Treorchy to Bridgend.

== See also ==
- Craig y Llyn
