= Wyndham Halt railway station =

Disused railway station in Wyndham, Bridgend County Borough

Wyndham
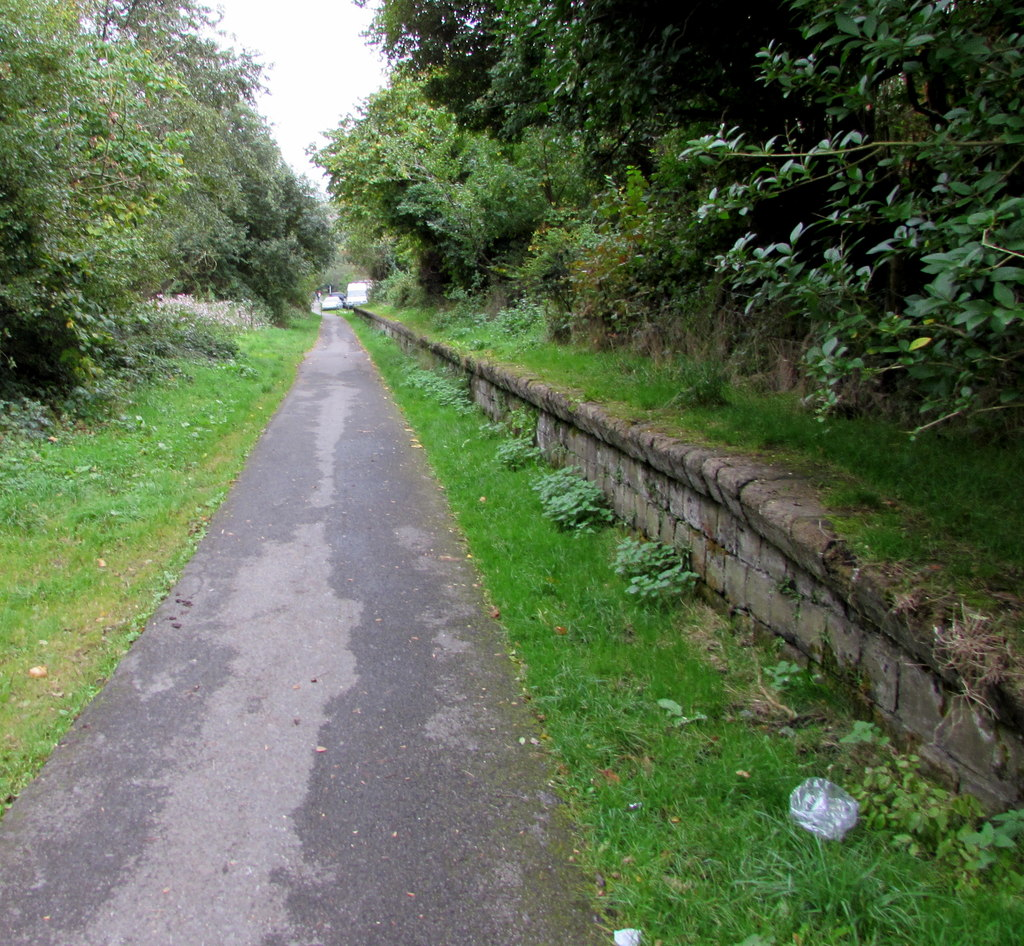
- The site of the station in 2018

General information
- Location: Wyndham, Glamorgan; Wales
- Coordinates: 51.6115°N 3.5431°W
- Grid reference: SS932914
- Platforms: 1

Other information
- Status: Disused

History
- Original company: Great Western Railway

Key dates
- 10 August 1942: Opened
- 5 May 1958: Closed
Location

Wyndham Halt railway station served the village of Wyndham, in the historical county of Glamorgan, Wales, from 1942 to 1958 on the Ogmore Valley Railway.

== History ==
The station was opened on 10 August 1942 by the Great Western Railway. It served two nearby collieries at Wyndham and Penllwyngwent. It closed on 5 May 1958. The platform still exists, albeit in an overgrown state.

| Preceding station | Disused railways | Following station |
|---|---|---|
| Nantymoel; Line and station closed | Great Western Railway; Ogmore Valley Railway | Ogmore Vale; Line and station closed |
