= Huw David =

Welsh politician

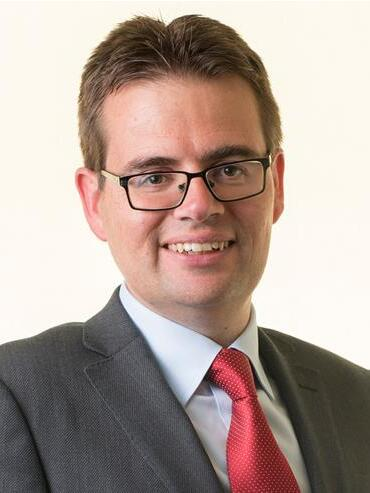
Official portrait, 2024

Huw John David OBE is a Welsh Labour politician and former leader of Bridgend County Borough Council between 2016 and 2024.

== Background ==
A resident of Cefn Cribbwr, David became the county borough councillor for his area in 2004.

He served as a backbencher until he was re-elected in 2008 and appointed Cabinet Member for Resources.

In 2012 he changed portfolios, taking on the role of Cabinet Member for Children and Young People. He was also appointed Deputy Leader in 2015.

After Mel Nott resigned as Leader in 2016, David was elected as his successor.

Under David’s Leadership, in the 2022 elections Welsh Labour won overall control of Bridgend County Borough Council for the first time since 2012. In May 2022 he was re-elected as council leader. He was appointed an Officer of the Order of the British Empire (OBE) in the 2022 Birthday Honours for public service.

On the 6th March 2024, David announced his intention to stand down as Leader of Bridgend County Borough Council at the annual meeting of Council on 15 May 2024. He was replaced by John Spanswick, who served in his Cabinet. Following his resignation, David was elected as the Deputy Mayor of Bridgend County Borough for 2024/25, while continuing to represent his ward of Pyle, Kenfig Hill and Cefn Cribwr.

He was elected Mayor of Bridgend County Borough for 2025/2026 replacing Heather Griffiths, and after completing his one year term, he was succeeded by Cllr Heidi Bennett.

David stood as a candidate in the 2026 Senedd election for the Pen-y-bont Bro Morgannwg constituency but was not elected.
