= Nantymoel railway station =

Disused railway station in Nant-y-moel, Bridgend County Borough

Nantymoel

General information
- Location: Nant-y-moel, Glamorgan; Wales
- Coordinates: 51.6263°N 3.5423°W
- Grid reference: SS933930
- Platforms: 1

Other information
- Status: Disused

History
- Original company: Llynvi and Ogmore Railway
- Pre-grouping: Great Western Railway
- Post-grouping: Great Western Railway

Key dates
- 12 May 1873: Opened
- 5 May 1958: Closed
Location

Nantymoel railway station served the village of Nant-y-moel, in the historical county of Glamorgan, Wales, from 1873 to 1958 on the Ogmore Valley Railway.

== History ==
The station was opened on 12 May 1873 by the Llynvi and Ogmore Railway. It was known as Nant-y-moel in the timetables from 1877 to the 1890s. It closed on 5 May 1958. The site is now a cycle path, part of route 883 of the National Cycle Network.

Preceding station	Disused railways	Following station
Terminus	Llynvi and Ogmore Railway; Ogmore Valley Railway	Wyndham Halt; Line and station closed
