= Ogmore Valley =

Coordinates: 51.603°N 3.547°W

Ogmore Valley: Welsh: Cwm Ogwr
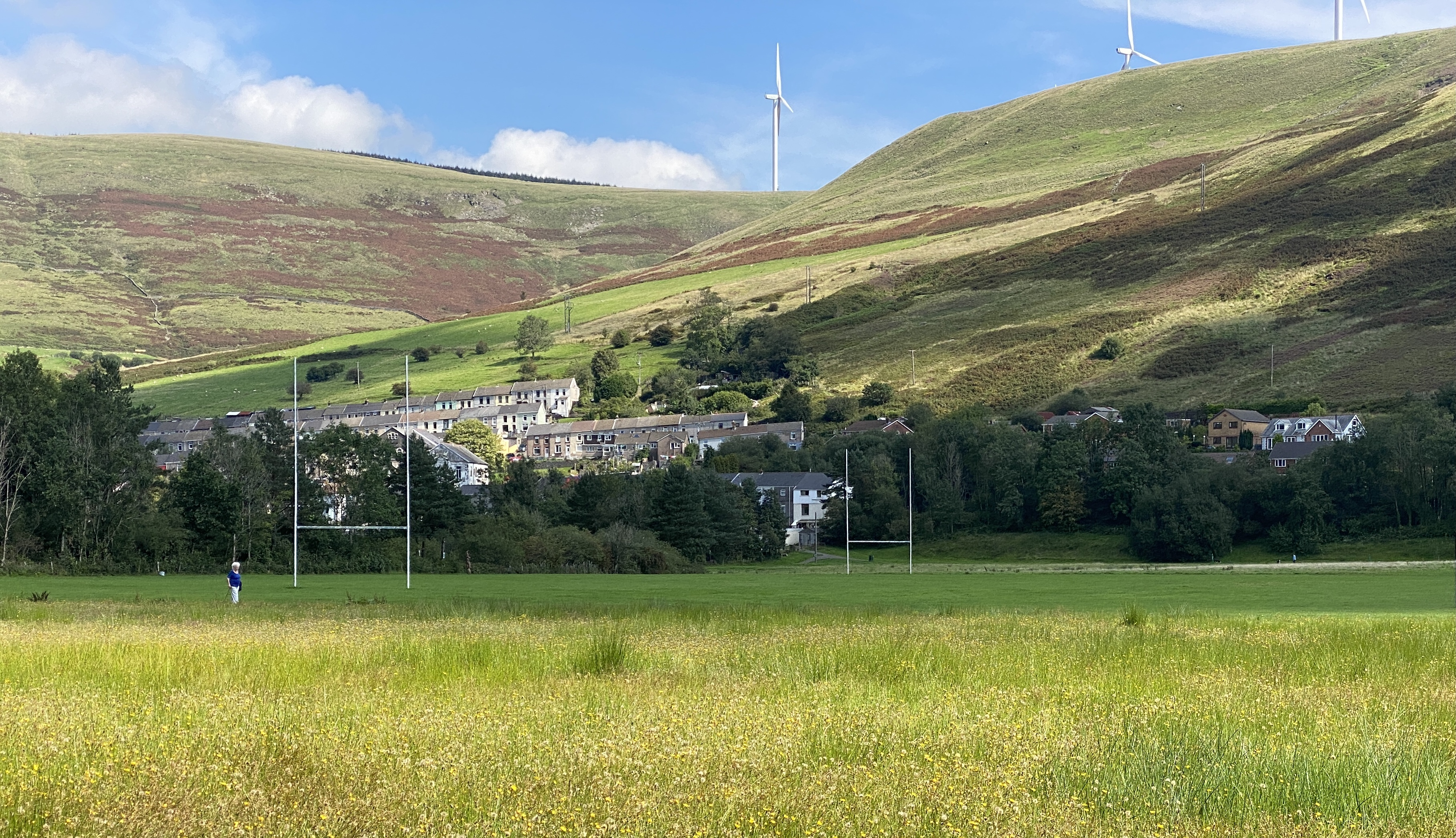
- Population: 7,954 (2011)
- OS grid reference: SS929904
- Community: Ogmore Valley
- Principal area: Bridgend County Borough
- Preserved county: Mid Glamorgan
- Country: Wales
- Sovereign state: United Kingdom
- Post town: BRIDGEND
- Postcode district: CF32
- Postcode district: CF35
- Dialling code: 01656
- Ambulance: Welsh
- UK Parliament: Rhondda and Ogmore
- Senedd Cymru – Welsh Parliament: Bridgend
- List of places UK Wales Map of the community

Ogmore Valley (Welsh: Cwm Ogwr) is a community in the Bridgend County Borough, Mid Glamorgan, Wales. Made up of the villages of Nantymoel, Ogmore Vale, Price Town and Wyndham, its population at the time of the 2001 census was 7,800, increasing to 7,954 at the 2011 Census. The ribbon housing of the valley follows the Ogwr Fawr tributary which rises at Craig Ogwr and joins the Ogwr Fach at Blackmill. Villages include Nantymoel, Price Town, Wyndham, Ogmore Vale, Lewistown, Pant-yr-awel and Blackmill.

Ogmore Valley contains most of the basins of the Ogwr Fawr and Ogwr Fach valleys and reaches as far north as the Bwlch-y-clawdd, a mountain whose road links the community to the Rhondda Valley. Originally a sparsely populated pastoral area, the arrival of the coal industry in the mid 19th century resulted in a population boom. From the 1860s onwards the valley experienced an increase in settlements after the establishment of the coal mines, later owned by the Ocean, Cory, Lewis Merthyr and Glenavon coal companies.

In 2022 Ogmore Valley Community Council made the news when only one person came forward to compete for the fifteen council seats.
