= Bridgend Central =

Electoral ward in Bridgend County Borough, Wales

Bridgend Central (Welsh: Canol Pen-y-bont) is an electoral ward in Bridgend County Borough, Wales. It covers part of the county town of Bridgend. The ward elects three councillors to Bridgend County Borough Council.

The ward was created following the recommendations of a 2019 local government boundary review, with the merger of the former county wards of Morfa and Newcastle.

According to the 2011 UK Census, the population of the Morfa ward was 4,692 and in the Newcastle ward it was 5,421. The boundary review predicted an electorate of 8,103.

== 2022 local election ==
Two of the three seats were won by Independents and the third by Labour's Stuart Baldwin. Independent Steve Bletsoe was already a Bridgend Town councillor and pledged to use his position to tackle the communal waste problem in the town.

Bridgend CBC election, 5 May 2022
Party	Candidate	Votes	%	±%
Independent	Tim Wood	1,159	44.7	
Labour	Stuart Baldwin	1,112	42.9	
Independent	Steven Bletsoe	1,072		
Independent	Steven Easterbrook	1,048		
Labour	Ceri Evans	1,043		
Labour	David White	980		
Conservative	Thomas Dwyer	324	12.5	
Conservative	Alex Hughes-Howells	310		
Conservative	Marco Pucella	297		

Only a few days after the election, Stuart Baldwin announced he was stepping away from politics and would not be taking up his seat. A by-election was required to fill the vacancy. Baldwin cited the increasinging toxicity of local politics and said he'd been attacked online, followed home after meetings and physically confronted for his views and his sexuality.

== 2022 by-election ==
A by election was arranged for 11 August 2022 to elect a replacement for Labour's Stuart Baldwin. It was won by independent candidate Steve Easterbrook with 716 votes, beating Labour's Ceri Evans by 126 votes.

== See also ==
- List of electoral wards in Bridgend County Borough
- List of electoral wards in Wales
