= Lewistown Halt railway station =

Short-lived railway station in Lewistown, Bridgend County Borough

Lewistown Halt
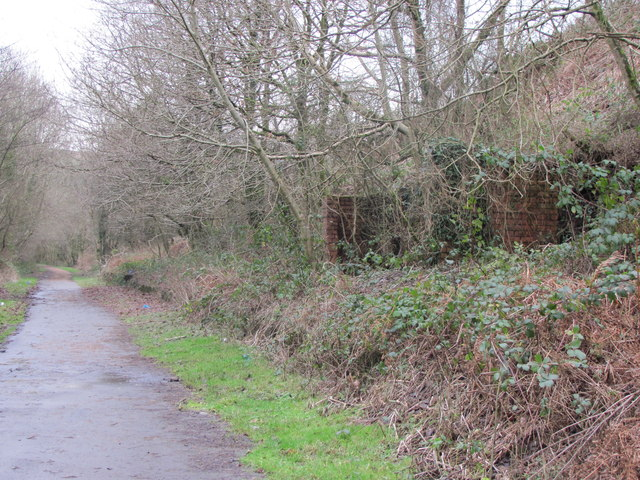
- The site of the station in 2012

General information
- Location: Lewistown, Glamorgan; Wales
- Coordinates: 51.5789°N 3.5434°W
- Grid reference: SS931878
- Platforms: 1

Other information
- Status: Disused

History
- Original company: Great Western Railway

Key dates
- 10 August 1942: Opened
- 4 June 1951: Closed
Location

Lewistown Halt railway station served the village of Lewistown, in the historical county of Glamorgan, Wales, from 1942 to 1951 on the Ogmore Valley Railway.

== History ==
The station was opened on 10 August 1942 by the Great Western Railway. It was a short-lived station, only being open for just under 9 years, closing on 4 June 1951.

Preceding station	Disused railways	Following station
Ogmore Vale; Line and station closed	Great Western Railway; Ogmore Valley Railway	Blackmill; Line and station closed
