= Bridgend (community) =

Bridgend: Welsh: Pen-y-Bont ar Ogwr
- Location within Bridgend
- Population: 13,950 (2001)
- OS grid reference: SS908800
- Community: Bridgend
- Principal area: Bridgend
- Preserved county: Mid Glamorgan
- Country: Wales
- Sovereign state: United Kingdom
- Post town: BRIDGEND
- Postcode district: CF31
- Dialling code: 01656
- Police: South Wales
- Fire: South Wales
- Ambulance: Welsh
- UK Parliament: Bridgend
- Senedd Cymru – Welsh Parliament: Bridgend
- Website: bridgendtowncouncil.gov.uk
- List of places UK Wales Bridgend 51.508663°N 3.574570°W Map of the community

Bridgend is a community in Bridgend County Borough, south Wales. Along with the communities of Brackla, Coychurch Lower and Laleston it makes up the town of Bridgend. Bridgend is the western district of Bridgend town, and takes in the town centre, Newcastle Hill, Tremains and to the north Wild Mill. The population of the community of Bridgend at the 2001 census was 13,950, increasing to 14,912 in the 2011 census.

The community of Bridgend was created in 1974 when the civil parishes of Wales were abolished. In 1996 a large change to the boundaries of Bridgend resulted in the community of Bridgend gaining a large proportion of the community of Ewenny, including the area known as Heronston.

== Buildings of note ==
One of the oldest structures in the community is Newcastle Castle a Norman fortification, overlooking the town from Newcastle Hill. The castle is now ruinous.

Near Brynteg Comprehensive School is Island Farm, a Second World War prisoner of war camp, site of a famous prison break in 1945. The break out camp is the only one of the prison structures to survive, and is now a listed building.
