= Ogmore Vale railway station =

Disused railway station in Ogmore Vale, Bridgend County Borough

Ogmore Vale
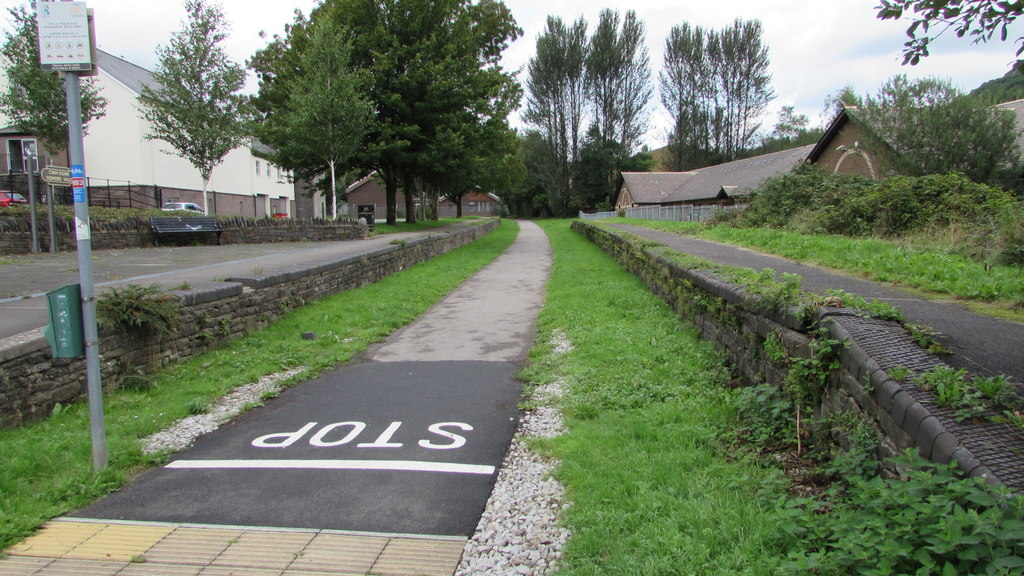
- The site of the station in 2018

General information
- Location: Ogmore Vale, Glamorgan; Wales
- Coordinates: 51.6046°N 3.5425°W
- Grid reference: SS932906
- Platforms: 1

Other information
- Status: Disused

History
- Original company: Llynvi and Ogmore Railway
- Pre-grouping: Great Western Railway
- Post-grouping: Great Western Railway

Key dates
- 12 May 1873: Opened as Tynewydd
- 22 August 1884: Name changed to Tynewydd Ogmore Vale
- 1 January 1902: Name changed to Ogmore Vale
- 5 May 1958: Closed
Location

Ogmore Vale railway station served the village of Ogmore Vale, in the historical county of Glamorgan, Wales, from 1873 to 1958 on the Ogmore Valley Railway.

== History ==
The station was opened as Tynewydd on 12 May 1873 by the Llynvi and Ogmore Railway. Its name was changed to Tynewydd Ogmore Vale on 22 August 1884 and changed to Ogmore Vale on 1 January 1902. It closed on 5 May 1958. The site is now a public footpath and a cycle path, part of route 883 of the National Cycle Network.

Preceding station	Disused railways	Following station
Wyndham Halt; Line and station closed	Ogmore Valley Railway	Lewistown Halt; Line and station closed
