= List of Welsh principal areas =

Population in Wales is concentrated in South Wales and the northeast; the remainder of the country is sparsely populated

This is a list of the 22 principal areas of Wales giving their most recent date of creation and the style by which they are known.

== List ==
Principal areas of Wales
Names		Style	Date created	Land area		Population (2024)	Density		Administrative centre
English	Welsh	Style	Date created	(km^{2})	(mi^{2})	Population (2024)	(/km^{2})	(/mi^{2})	Administrative centre
Isle of Anglesey	Ynys Môn	County	1996 (Note: Re-instated as a principal administrative authority after a gap)	712	275	69,097	97	250	Llangefni
Blaenau Gwent		County borough	1996	109	42	67,873	624	1,620	Ebbw Vale
Bridgend	Pen-y-bont ar Ogwr	County borough	1996	251	97	147,530	588	1,520	Bridgend
Caerphilly	Caerffili	County borough	1996	277	107	176,865	638	1,650	Ystrad Mynach
Cardiff	Caerdydd	County, city	1996	141	54	383,919	2,724	7,060	Cardiff
Carmarthenshire	Sir Gaerfyrddin	County	1996	2,370	920	190,800	80	210	Carmarthen
Ceredigion (Note: Named as 'Cardiganshire' in legislation. Name changed by the council.)		County	1996	1,785	689	72,599	41	110	Aberaeron and Aberystwyth
Conwy (Note: Named as 'Aberconwy and Colwyn' in legislation. Name changed by the council.)		County borough	1996	1,126	435	114,891	102	260	Conwy
Denbighshire	Sir Ddinbych	County	1996 (Note: Re-instated as a principal administrative authority after a gap. Boundaries significantly altered in 1996 from its previous incarnation.)	837	323	98,202	117	300	Ruthin
Flintshire	Sir y Fflint	County	1996	440	170	155,867	354	920	Mold
Gwynedd (Note: Named as 'Caernarfonshire and Merionethshire' in legislation. Name changed by the council.)		County	1974 (Note: Boundaries significantly altered in 1996 from its previous incarnation.)	2,535	979	120,813	48	120	Caernarfon
Merthyr Tydfil	Merthyr Tudful	County borough	1996	111	43	58,972	529	1,370	Merthyr Tydfil
Monmouthshire	Sir Fynwy	County	1996	849	328	94,930	112	290	Usk
Neath Port Talbot (Note: Named as 'Neath and Port Talbot' in legislation. Name changed by the council.)	Castell-nedd Port Talbot	County borough	1996	441	170	143,249	325	840	Port Talbot
Newport	Casnewydd	County borough, city	1996	190	73	167,899	882	2,280	Newport
Pembrokeshire	Sir Benfro	County	1996	1,618	625	125,761	78	200	Haverfordwest
Powys		County	1974	5,181	2,000	135,059	26	67	Llandrindod Wells
Rhondda Cynon Taf		County borough	1996	424	164	242,844	573	1,480	Pontypridd
Swansea	Abertawe	County, city	1996	378	146	251,304	666	1,720	Swansea
Torfaen		County borough	1996	126	49	94,119	749	1,940	Pontypool
Vale of Glamorgan	Bro Morgannwg	County borough	1996	331	128	135,743	410	1,100	Barry
Wrexham	Wrecsam	County borough, city	1996	504	195	138,245	274	710	Wrexham

== See also ==
- List of Welsh areas by percentage of Welsh-speakers
