= Cefn Hirgoed =

Ridge in Bridgend County Borough, South Wales

Highest point
- Elevation: 142 m (466 ft)
- Prominence: 44 m (144 ft)
- Coordinates: 51.536°N 3.532°W

Naming
- English translation: back (ridge) of the long wood
- Language of name: Welsh

Geography
- Location: Bridgend, Wales
- OS grid: SS939829
- Topo map: OS Landranger 170 / Explorer 151

Cefn Hirgoed is a ridge in Bridgend county borough in South Wales. The ridge extends for about 5 km east from the village of Sarn just north of Bridgend to Pen-prysg north of Pencoed. At the point where it reaches its highest elevation of 142m, are a couple of covered reservoirs. Towards the west the M4 motorway runs along the hill's southern edge.

== Geology ==
The hill is formed from relatively hard-wearing sandstones of the South Wales Lower Coal Measures with mudstone layers between the sandstones which here dip steeply northwards into the South Wales Coalfield syncline.

== Access ==
Almost the entire hill is mapped as open country under the Countryside and Rights of Way Act 2000 giving a general right of access on foot to the public. It and the adjacent Hirwaun Common are also crossed by several public footpaths. A couple of minor roads, Heol Spencer and Heol Llan/Heol-Las, run north–south across the ridge.

== Duel ==
Early records refer to Robert Thomas who in 1661 was charged at the Great Sessions of Glamorgan with the murder of Edmund Thomas in a duel fought on Cefn Hirgoed on 4 February 1660.

He was outlawed and his lands and possessions taken from him. In 1669 he was pardoned with a restitution of lands and possessions, including Tregroes House in Pencoed.
