= Mel Nott =

Welsh politician

Melvyn Ernest John Nott OBE (1942 - ) was a Welsh politician who was a county councillor in Bridgend County Borough. He was leader of Bridgend County Borough Council between 2008 and 2016.

== Background ==
Following a split in the Sarn and Bryncethin Labour Party in 1991, the sitting councillor for the St Brides Minor ward, Mel Winter, was deselected in favour of Mel Nott for the 1991 Ogwr Borough Council election. Winter stood as an independent candidate and retained the seat, with Nott losing out by 150 votes. Nott was instead elected as a councillor to Mid Glamorgan County Council in 1992, subsequently elected to Bridgend County Borough Council as a Labour councillor for St Brides Minor in 1995. He was elected unopposed to the new Sarn ward in 1999.

Following the May 2008 elections, in which Labour gained a majority on the council, Nott (as the Labour group leader) became leader of the council.

Nott was appointed an Officer of the Order of the British Empire (OBE) in the 2013 New Year Honours, for services to the community and to Local Government.

After surviving a leadership challenge in May 2016, Nott announced in August 2016 he would be retiring as council leader in October of that year. He planned to step down as Sarn councillor at the May 2017 elections.
