= Price Town =

Settlement in the upper reaches of the Cwm Ogwr Fawr, Wales

Coordinates: 51.6198°N 3.5364°W

Price Town is situated 9 miles north of the County Town of Bridgend on the A4061 road in the upper reaches of the Cwm Ogwr Fawr (the Greater Ogmore Valley), Wales. It was developed to provide accommodation for the rapidly increasing work force of the Wyndham and Ocean Western Collieries. Today, Price Town is regarded as part of the village Nantymoel.
