= Llangynwyd Lower =

Llangynwyd Lower: Welsh: Llangynwyd Isaf
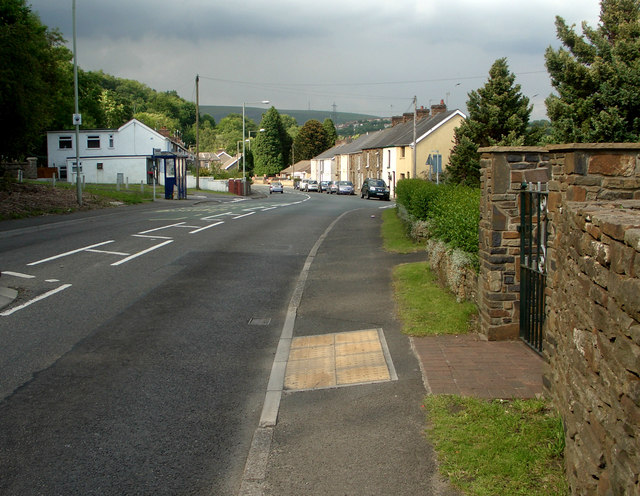
- Coytrahen

- Location within Bridgend
- Population: 440
- OS grid reference: SS870855
- Community: Llangynwyd Lower
- Principal area: Bridgend
- Preserved county: Mid Glamorgan
- Country: Wales
- Sovereign state: United Kingdom
- Post town: BRIDGEND
- Postcode district: CF32
- Dialling code: 01656
- Police: South Wales
- Fire: South Wales
- Ambulance: Welsh
- UK Parliament: Bridgend
- Senedd Cymru – Welsh Parliament: Bridgend
- List of places UK Wales Bridgend 51.557709°N 3.630937°W Map of the community

Llangynwyd Lower (Welsh: Llangynwyd Isaf) is a community in Bridgend County Borough, south Wales. It is located to the north west of Bridgend and contains the village of Coytrahen. At the 2001 census, the population of the community was 467, reducing to 440 at the 2011 Census.

The community is the southern part of the old parish of Llangynwyd, and was created by government reorganization in 1974. The majority of Llangynwyd Lower is made up of hilly farmland and is sparsely populated. The western border of the community is a woodland valley, while the eastern border roughly follows the River Llynfi and the A4063 road.

== Buildings of note ==
To the west of the community on the slopes of Mynydd Ty-talwyn, are the remains of several medieval house platforms.

Coytrahen House is an 18th and 19th century landscaped park containing a once elegant three-storey country house. The house and gardens were built during the ownership of John Popkin, but during the industrialisation of the area the western edge of the park was opened up to the Great Western Railway. The track of the original 1828 Maesteg to Porthcawl Tramway runs through the area, on the hillside, west of the present rail line.

At the community's northern border is the farm of Cefn Ydfa, the home of Ann Maddocks.
