= Gilfach Goch railway station =

Disused railway station in Gilfach Goch, Rhondda Cynon Taf

Coordinates: 51.5896°N 3.4755°W

Gilfach Goch

General information
- Location: Gilfach Goch, Glamorgan; Wales
- Platforms: 1

Other information
- Status: Disused

History
- Original company: Great Western Railway
- Post-grouping: Great Western Railway

Key dates
- 9 May 1881: Opened
- 5 March 1928: Temporarily closed
- 26 March 1928: Reopened
- 22 September 1930: Closed
Location

Gilfach Goch railway station served the village of Gilfach Goch, in the historical county of Glamorgan, Wales, from 1881 to 1930 on the Ely Valley Railway.

== History ==
The station was opened on 9 May 1881 by the Great Western Railway. It closed on 5 March 1928 but reopened three weeks later on 26 March 1928, only to close on 22 September 1930, although it was used for work trains to the Tremains factory from 6 October 1941 as well as unadvertised services. Coal traffic from collieries continued until 1960. The workmens' trains ended in 1947. Any passenger trains after that date were excursions. The line was taken out of use in February 1962 and lifted by May 1964.

Preceding station	Disused railways	Following station
Terminus	Great Western Railway; Ely Valley Railway	Hendreforgan; Line and station closed
