= Pricetown, Trumbull County, Ohio =

Unincorporated community in Ohio, U.S.

Coordinates: 41°08′04″N 80°57′55″W

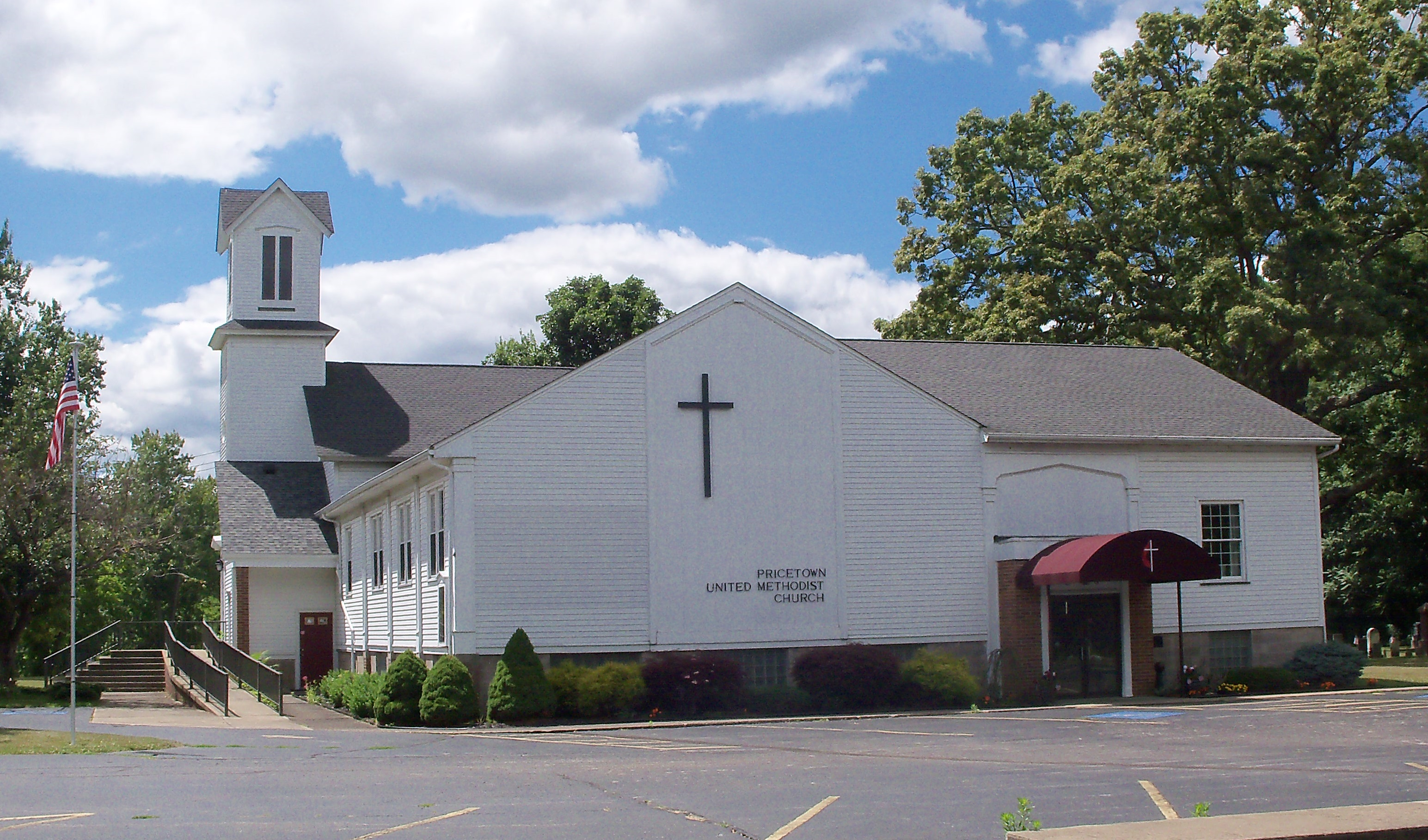
Pricetown United Methodist Church

Pricetown is an unincorporated community in Mahoning and Trumbull counties, in the U.S. state of Ohio.

The community was named for Robert Price, the proprietor of a local mill.
