= 2012 Bridgend County Borough Council election =

2012 Welsh local government election

Results of the 2012 Bridgend County Borough Council election

The 2012 Bridgend County Borough Council election took place on 3 May 2012 to elect members of Bridgend County Borough Council in Wales. This was the same day as other 2012 United Kingdom local elections.

== Result ==
With a 34.99% turnout of the electorate, the Labour Party won an additional 12 seats. This gave the Labour Group an overall majority, which they had not had for the previous eight years. However, Labour's council cabinet member, Alana Davies, lost her seat (Porthcawl East) to an Independent candidate. The Conservatives retained only the Newton seat, losing five councillors.

Bridgend County Borough Council Election 2012
Party	Seats	Gains	Losses	Net gain/loss	Seats %	Votes %	Votes	+/−
Labour	39			+12	72.2	47.4	16,867	+8.3
Independent	10			+1	18.5	21.2	7,537	+3.4
Conservative	1			-5	1.8	12.2	4,335	-4.2
Liberal Democrats	3			-3	5.5	10.0	3,546	-13.0
Plaid Cymru	1			0	1.8	7.0	2,497	+3.6
Green	0			0	0.0	2.2	770	New
National Front	0			0	0.0	0.1	46	New

Five out of the fifty four seats were elected unopposed.

== Ward results ==
Aberkenfig
Party	Candidate	Votes	%	±%
Independent	Mel Winter	323	42.9	
Labour	Gary Haines	285	37.8	
Plaid Cymru	Nicola Thomas	145	19.3	
Majority		38	5.0	
Turnout		753		
Independent hold		Swing		

Bettws
Party	Candidate	Votes	%	±%
Labour	Christopher Michaelides	273	76.3	
Green	Gareth Harris	85	23.7	
Majority		188	52.5	
Turnout		358		
Labour hold		Swing		

Brackla
Party	Candidate	Votes	%	±%
Labour	David Sage	1,247		
Labour	John Spanswick	1,188		
Labour	Craig Jones	1,003		
Labour	Hailey Townsend	984		
Conservative	Pat Hacking	628		
Conservative	Terry Hacking	589		
Independent	Michael Quick	469		
Liberal Democrats	Charlotte Berrow	416		
Plaid Cymru	Daniel Thomas	287		
Plaid Cymru	Nicholas Thomas	258		
Turnout		753		
Labour hold		Swing		
Labour gain from Conservative		Swing		
Labour hold		Swing		
Labour gain from Conservative		Swing		

Llangewydd & Brynhyfryd
Party	Candidate	Votes	%	±%
Labour	Malcolm David Francis	397	66.27	
Liberal Democrats	Eric Hughes	156	26.04	
National Front	Adam John Lloyd	46	7.67	N/A
Majority		241		
Turnout		599		
