= Irreligion in Wales =

Religion in Wales (2021)
1. No religion (46.5%)
2. Christianity (43.6%)
3. Islam (2.20%)
4. Other religions (1.40%)
5. Not stated (6.30%)

Irreligion in Wales or non-religion in Wales has become the most dominant religious identity in Wales in the 21st century, following rapid social secularisation in Welsh society.

== History and demography ==
Following the Welsh Intermediate Education Act 1889, the arrival of secular education was a major blow to Welsh nonconformist Christianity.

Male voice choirs also emerged in the 19th century, formed as the tenor and bass sections of chapel choirs, and embraced the popular secular hymns of the day.

John Davies has suggested that there is a lack of written record about irreligion in Wales, stating,"The irreligious are a lost element in Welsh historiography; as they have left virtually no written record. The historians of the twentieth century have tended to ignore them... However, although the existence of an irreligious element must be acknowledged, it was much smaller in Wales than it was in England".

According to Paul Chambers, Welsh medium chapel and denominations provided sanctuary and the cultural protection of the Welsh language, later leading to the formation of Plaid Cymru. The state then took over this cultural defence role with the Welsh Language Act 1967 and later legislation. This secularisation is related to structural differentiation and state power, and this particular process seems very specific to Wales.

By the start of the 21st century, the Welsh had become one of the most secular nations in Europe,

In response to the 2011 census results in Wales, English evolutionary biologist Richard Dawkins suggested that Wales was ahead of the other countries of the UK in moving towards non-religious views.

In 2020, Wales Humanists praised the unique and mostly exemplary political culture of modern Wales, which included a devolved administration which was established as a secular institution. Their report also praises the introduction of opt-out organ donation and suggests that Wales has a legacy of independent thought and equality. Suggestions made by the report include ending religious discrimination by faith schools and through collective worship, introducing non-religious pastoral care in hospitals, and legal recognition of non-religious marriages.

In a new age 3-16 curriculum rolled out in 2022, the Welsh Government changed the traditional Religious Education (RE) subject to "Religion Values and Ethics" which "must also reflect that fact that a number of non-religious philosophical convictions are also held in Wales".

In November 2022, the 2021 census results were published showing that being non-religious was the largest single statistical group in Wales. Wales Humanists coordinator Kathy Riddick responded to this news by noting that Wales is now officially the least religious country in the UK and that this was not a new development. She also suggested that politicians in Wales are "overdue to properly address" this fact in law and public policy. She added, "Thankfully in navigating these changes, Wales has a strong tradition of supporting freedom of religion or belief to draw on, from disestablishment over 100 years ago to the creation of the most inclusive curriculum in the UK just last year".

== Demographics ==
The number of non-religious people in Wales was 18.5% according to the 2001 census, which rose to 32.1% in 2011.

A 2018 poll, found that 58% of Welsh people were non-religious, making Wales the most non-religious country in the UK.

The annual population of Wales data of 2019 showed that under 50% of people in Wales considered themselves to be Christians, with almost as many being non-religious.

The 2021 census recorded 46.5 per cent had “No religion” which is a larger statistical group than any single religion and up from 32.1 per cent in 2011.

The Office for National Statistics (ONS), which is responsible for publishing Census data stated that answering the religion question on the census was voluntary. They added that more people in Wales chose to answer the question in 2021 compared to 2011. The ONS suggested that the ageing population, fertility, mortality, and migration could be contributing factors to the rise in non-religion.

=== Regional ===
The following is a table of non-religious people in Wales by local authority area as found in the 2021 census results in Wales.

Local authority area	Non-religious people
Caerphilly	57%
Blaenau Gwent	56%
Rhondda Cynon Taf	56%
Merthyr Tydfil	53%
Bridgend	52%
Torfaen	51%
Neath Port Talbot	50%
Vale of Glamorgan	48%
Swansea	47%
Carmarthenshire	44%
Gwynedd	44%
Monmouthshire	43%
Newport	43%
Ceredigion	43%
Pembrokeshire	43%
Cardiff	43%
Denbighshire	42%
Powys	42%
Wrexham	42%
Conwy	41%
Isle of Anglesey	41%
Flintshire	41%

=== Ethnicity ===
The following is a table of the Irreligious populations among ethnic groups and Nationalities in Wales.

Irrelgious by ethnic group and nationality
Ethnic group	2021	
Ethnic group	Number	% of ethnic group reported no religion
White	1,403,024	48.12
– British	1,375,805	48.88
– Irish	3,235	24.48
– Irish Traveller	934	26.31
– Roma	395	21.43
– Other White	22,655	27.31
Asian	13,821	15.52
– Indian	1,466	6.96
– Pakistani	384	2.19
– Bangladeshi	334	2.18
– Chinese	9,060	62.64
– Other Asian	2,577	12.48
Black	2,440	8.86
– African	811	4.07
– Caribbean	999	27.00
– Other Black	630	15.96
Mixed	23,835	49.04
– White and Black Caribbean	7,852	57.18
– White and Asian	7,016	49.99
– White and Black African	3,259	40.39
– Other Mixed	5,708	44.72
Arab	560	4.81
Other ethnic group	2,718	18.33
TOTAL	1,446,398	46.5

== See also ==
- Irreligion in the United Kingdom
- Religion in Wales
