= Pencoed =

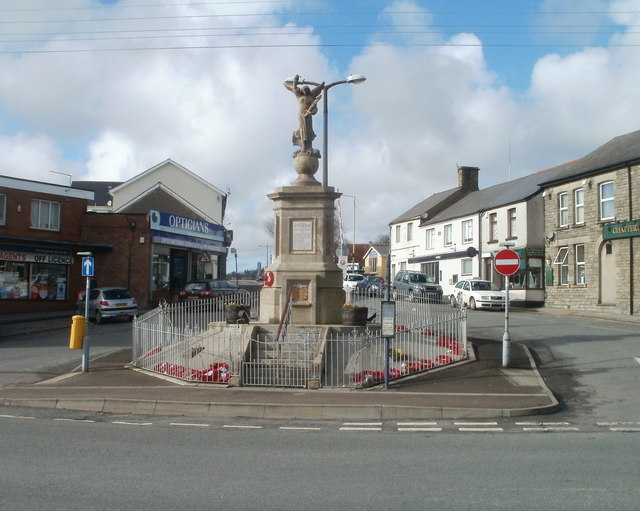
- Pencoed War Memorial

- Location within Bridgend
- Population: 9,166
- OS grid reference: SS957815
- Principal area: Bridgend
- Preserved county: Mid Glamorgan
- Country: Wales
- Sovereign state: United Kingdom
- Post town: BRIDGEND
- Postcode district: CF35
- Dialling code: 01656
- Police: South Wales
- Fire: South Wales
- Ambulance: Welsh
- UK Parliament: Bridgend
- List of places UK Wales Bridgend 51.52275°N 3.50474°W Map of the community

Pencoed (also Pen-coed; Welsh pronunciation) is a town and community in the county borough of Bridgend, Wales. It straddles the M4 motorway north east of Bridgend and is situated on the Ewenny River. At the 2022 census it had a population of 10,011.

== Toponymy and pronunciation ==
The name appears as "Penkoyt" in a 1303 deed of Ewenny Priory and as "Pencoyd" in the seventeenth and eighteenth century. The name is likely a contraction of pen-y-coed (head/top/end of the forest/wood) and has historically been given as both Pen-coed and Pencoed. While some local business, roads and signage use the hyphenated version, the Welsh Language Commissioner recommends the spelling in both English and Welsh to be "Pencoed".

The standard pronunciation in modern Welsh is [pɛn ˈkɔid] or [pɛn ˈkɔɨd]. However, the diphthong 'oe' in a monosyllable is generally reduced to a long vowel 'o' [o:] in South Wales, so the local pronunciation is [pɛn ˈkoːd]. This is sometimes spelled as "Pen-côd" in texts written in Gwenhwyseg (the local dialect).

== History ==
The earliest evidence of habitation in the area is the nearby Ogof y Pebyll ("Tents Cave") or Ogof Coed-y-Mwstwr ("Hubbub Wood Cave")), which is a scheduled monument and appears to have been inhabited during Neolithic or Bronze Age periods. Worked flint flakes have been found, along with the teeth of numerous mammals of many different species.

The area remained heavily wooded and sparsely populated until the eighteenth century. A map of 1729 shows "coal pitts" in the area and coal, lime, timbers and stone all contributed to the growth of the village. The development of the industrial villages was heavily influenced by Isambard Kingdom Brunel’s route for the South Wales Railway and the construction of a Railway Station between Pencoed and Penprysg in 1856. The two hamlets became the centre of the village of Pencoed. In just over a century and a half, Pencoed’s population increased from less than 500 to more than 12,000.

== Present day ==
The town is in the Ewenny Valley and is divided by the M4 motorway near Junction 35, although almost all of the town lies to the north of the M4. About two miles north of the town, the upland relief of the South Wales Valleys starts. To the south are the rolling countryside of the Vale of Glamorgan and the rugged north coast of the Bristol Channel.

The town consists of three distinct areas, which were once four small hamlets. To the north is Penprysg ("copse end"), which lies at the end of the low ridge (100 m) of Cefn Hirgoed ("long wood ridge"). To the west is Hendre ("lowland winter homestead", literally "old settlement") which rises gently from the railway line in the centre of the town towards the common land at Ystadwaun, on older maps as Ystad y Waun and Gwastadwaun ("level moor"). The central and eastern part of the town, which lies on the valley floor near the railway, consists of Pencoed itself and Felindre ("mill settlement"). There are numerous streams rising and running through the town, and two main rivers, the Ewenni Fawr (Great Ewenny) and the Ewenni Fach (Little Ewenny). At the centre of the town, close to the station, is the war memorial (known locally as the Monument), the shopping centre and the local Community Hall (Pencoed Miners' Welfare Hall). The village is well provided with sports facilities, schools, pubs and clubs. A new development, Earlswood Parc, was announced in 2002 and now has been completed, incorporating various Westbury built homes and Bocam business park.

The current mayor is Councillor Tracey Lyddon.

Pencoed hosted the National Eisteddfod in 1998.

The Raspberry Pi single-board computer is manufactured at the Sony Technology Centre in Pencoed, which produces 44,000 every week.

== Sport ==
Pencoed is noted for producing Rugby Union players. Pencoed RFC has produced a number of international players for both Wales and the British and Irish Lions. Most notably, three Pencoed players (Gareth Thomas, Gareth Cooper and Gavin Henson) all took part in the 2005 British & Irish Lions tour to New Zealand with Thomas captaining the Test team.

== Twinning ==
Pencoed has twinning arrangements with:

- Waldsassen, Germany
- Plouzané, France
