= Rhondda and Ogmore =

UK Parliament constituency (since 2024)

- constituency for the House of Commons
- Interactive map of the constituency.
- Location of the constituency within Wales
- Electorate: 73,557 (March 2020)
- Major settlements: Tonypandy, Treorchy, Porth, Treherbert, Maerdy

Current constituency
- Member of Parliament: Chris Bryant (Labour)
- Seats: One

Overlaps
- Senedd: Afan Ogwr Rhondda

Rhondda and Ogmore (Welsh: Rhondda ac Ogwr) is a constituency in Wales represented in the House of Commons of the UK Parliament. It was first contested at the 2024 general election, following the 2023 review of Westminster constituencies. It is currently represented by Sir Chris Bryant of the Labour Party, who was the Member of Parliament (MP) for the predecessor seat of Rhondda from 2001 to 2024. He has served as Secretary of State for Northern Ireland since 2026. `

== Constituency profile ==
The seat covers the Rhondda Valley including Porth and Tonypandy. Electoral Calculus characterises the seat as "Traditional", reflecting a working-class population who have largely supported Labour. Incomes and house prices are well below UK averages.

== Boundaries ==
Under the 2023 review, the constituency was defined as being composed of the following as they existed on 1 December 2020:

- The County Borough of Bridgend wards of: Bettws; Blackmill; Blaengarw; Llangeinor; Nant-y-moel; Ogmore Vale; Pontycymmer.
- The County Borough of Rhondda Cynon Taf wards of: Cwm Clydach; Cymmer; Ferndale; Gilfach Goch; Llwyn-y-pia; Maerdy; Pentre; Pen-y-graig; Porth; Tonypandy; Tonyrefail East; Tonyrefail West; Trealaw; Treherbert; Treorchy; Tylorstown; Ynyshir; Ystrad.

Following local government boundary reviews which came into effect in May 2022, the constituency now comprises the following from the 2024 general election:

- The County Borough of Bridgend wards of: Blackmill; Garw Valley; Nant-y-moel; Ogmore Vale.
- The County Borough of Rhondda Cynon Taf wards of: Cwm Clydach; Cymmer; Ferndale and Maerdy; Gilfach-goch; Llwyn-y-pia; Pentre; Pen-y-graig; Porth; Tonypandy; Tonyrefail East; Tonyrefail West; Trealaw; Treherbert; Treorchy; Tylorstown and Ynyshir; Ystrad.

The parts in Rhondda Cynon Taf comprise the whole of the former constituency of Rhondda plus the community of Tonyrefail, transferred from Pontypridd. The parts in the Bridgend County Borough were previously part of the abolished constituency of Ogmore.

== Election results ==
=== Elections in the 2020s ===
General election 2024: Rhondda and Ogmore
Party	Candidate	Votes	%	±%
Labour	Chris Bryant	17,118	47.8	−8.5
Reform	Darren James	9,328	26.1	+14.6
Plaid Cymru	Owen Cutler	5,198	14.5	+2.1
Conservative	Adam Robinson	2,050	5.7	−9.7
Green	Christine Glossop	1,177	3.3	+1.9
Liberal Democrats	Gerald Francis	935	2.6	+0.3
Majority		7,790	21.8	−19.0
Turnout		35,806	48.1	−9.7
Registered electors		74,493		
Labour hold		Swing		

=== Elections in the 2010s ===
2019 notional result (Note: Estimate of the 2019 general election result as if the revised boundaries recommended under the 2023 boundary review were in place)
Party	Vote	%
Labour	23,949	56.3
Conservative	6,572	15.4
Plaid Cymru	5,290	12.4
Brexit Party	4,902	11.5
Liberal Democrats	969	2.3
Green Party	590	1.4
Independent	277	0.7
Majority	17,377	40.8
Turnout	42,549	57.8
Electorate	73,557	
