= Blackmill =

Village in south Wales

Coordinates: 51.5697°N 3.5393°W

Blackmill (Welsh: Melin Ifan Ddu) is a small village within Bridgend County Borough Council, in south Wales. It is located at the confluence of the Ogwr Fach and Ogmore rivers, to the north-east of Bridgend town.

It is sited within the community (parish) of Ogmore Valley. The ward population taken at the 2011 census was 2,493.

The settlement was the site of a Wesleyan Methodist chapel which was built in 1885, although as of 2005 the building was no longer in use as a church and was due to be converted to housing. In 1915 a new church (All Saints) was opened in the community.
