= River Ogmore =

River in south Wales

Ogmore river
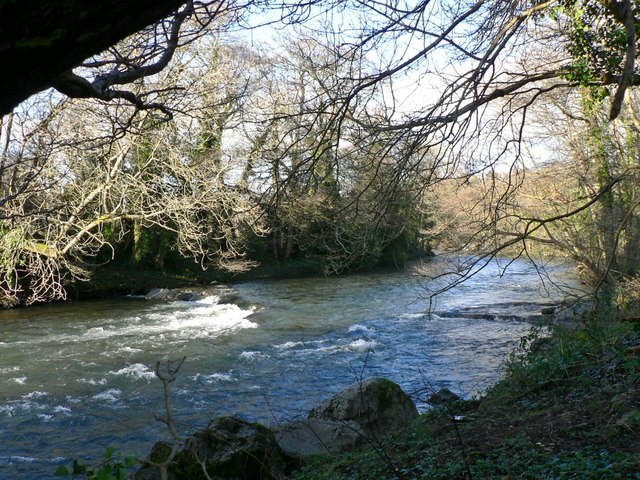
- The Ogmore River at Pen-y-cae, north of Bridgend.
- Native name: Afon Ogwr (Welsh)

Location
- Country: Wales
- Cities: Blackmill, Brynmenyn, Aberkenfig, Bridgend, Ogmore-by-Sea

Physical characteristics
- Source
  - location: Craig Ogwr
- Mouth
  - location: Bristol Channel near Ogmore-by-Sea
  - coordinates: 51°28′11″N 3°38′18″W

Basin features
- Tributaries
  - left: Ewenny River
  - right: River Llynfi, River Garw

The River Ogmore (Welsh: Afon Ogwr) is a river in South Wales that is popular with anglers. It runs generally from north to south from the Ogmore Vale and Gilfach Goch, past Bridgend and Ogmore. The River Ogmore rises at Craig Ogwr (527 m) in the Ogmore Valley as the Ogwr Fawr before it links with the Ogwr Fach at Blackmill. The River Llynfi, the River Garw and finally the River Ewenny in its estuary are all tributaries of the Ogmore which flows into the sea between Ogmore-by-Sea and the Merthyr Mawr sand-dunes.

== Geology and geography ==
The Ogmore has two major branches in its headwaters: the Ogwr Fawr which flows south through Nantymoel, Ogmore Vale and Lewistown; and joining it from the east the Ogwr Fach which flows through Gilfach Goch. After the confluence with the Nant Iechyd, they join to form the Afon Ogwr at Blackmill.

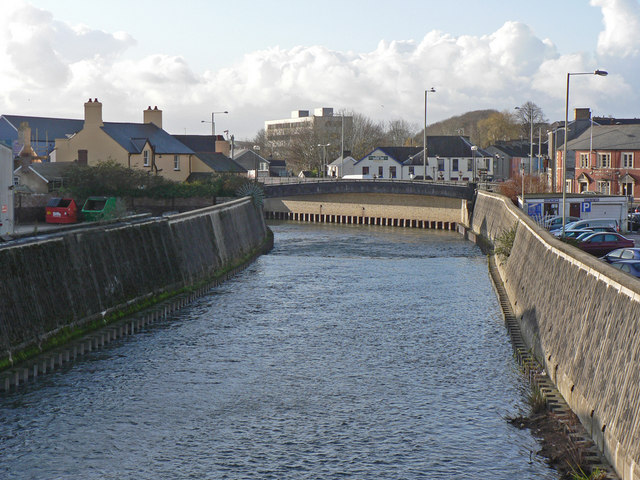
The Ogmore and its tributaries were confined to narrow concrete channels to prevent flooding

Most of the headwaters flow over Carboniferous coal measures overlain by glacial drift and fluvial gravels. The valleys are reasonably broad for a small river, and many of the tributaries meandered through their valleys in the past. The considerable urbanisation, especially in the 19th century, confined most rivers to rather narrow artificial channels, bordered in places such as Bridgend with concrete flood protection walls.

== Major tributaries ==
=== River Llynfi ===
The River Llynfi (Welsh: Afon Llynfi), runs for around 10 miles from its source north of Maesteg and flows generally southwards through the Llynfi Valley to the confluence with the River Ogmore at Aberkenfig.

=== River Garw ===
The River Garw flows broadly north-south and runs through Pontycymer to its confluence with the Ogmore (Ogwr) at Brynmenyn.

=== River Ewenny ===
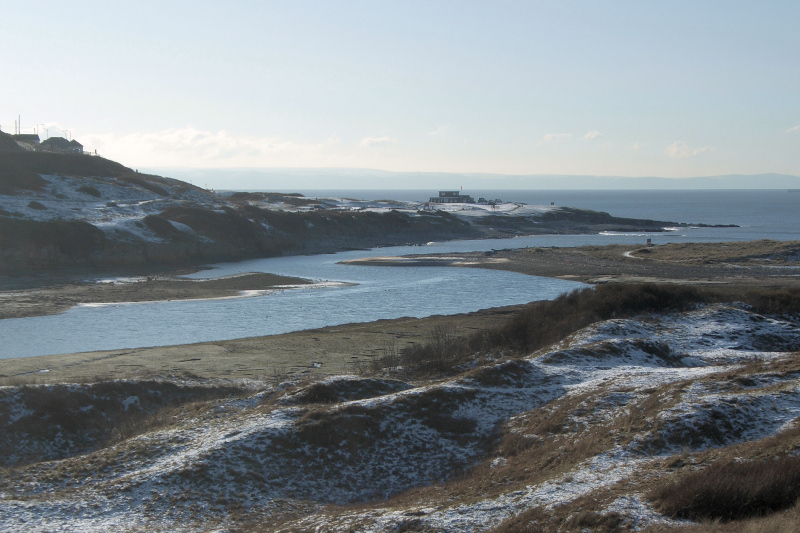
The river enters the Bristol Channel at Ogmore-by-Sea, at a popular beach called Traeth-yr-Afon.

The Ewenny River (Welsh: Afon Ewenni) rises to the north-east of Bridgend town and flows through Pencoed and Coychurch before entering the River Ogmore estuary just below Ogmore Castle.

== Environment ==
The industrialisation of the valley of the Ogmore by mining and heavy industry severely damaged much of the natural environment of the river. However, there has been an improvement in recent years and it supports a healthy population of aquatic invertebrates. The river does still have some problems though, including its proximity to major industrial plants, insensitive development and invasive weeds.

== River Clean Project ==
On 29 August 2023, 200 volunteers gathered at the banks of the Ogmore River to help remove 2,000 tyres from the river bed. This project was coordinated by a local dog walker with the support of 50 different partners/agencies/companies/local individuals. During the clean, 32 trolleys were removed from the river with nearly a tonne of waste plastic and metals.

== Estuary ==
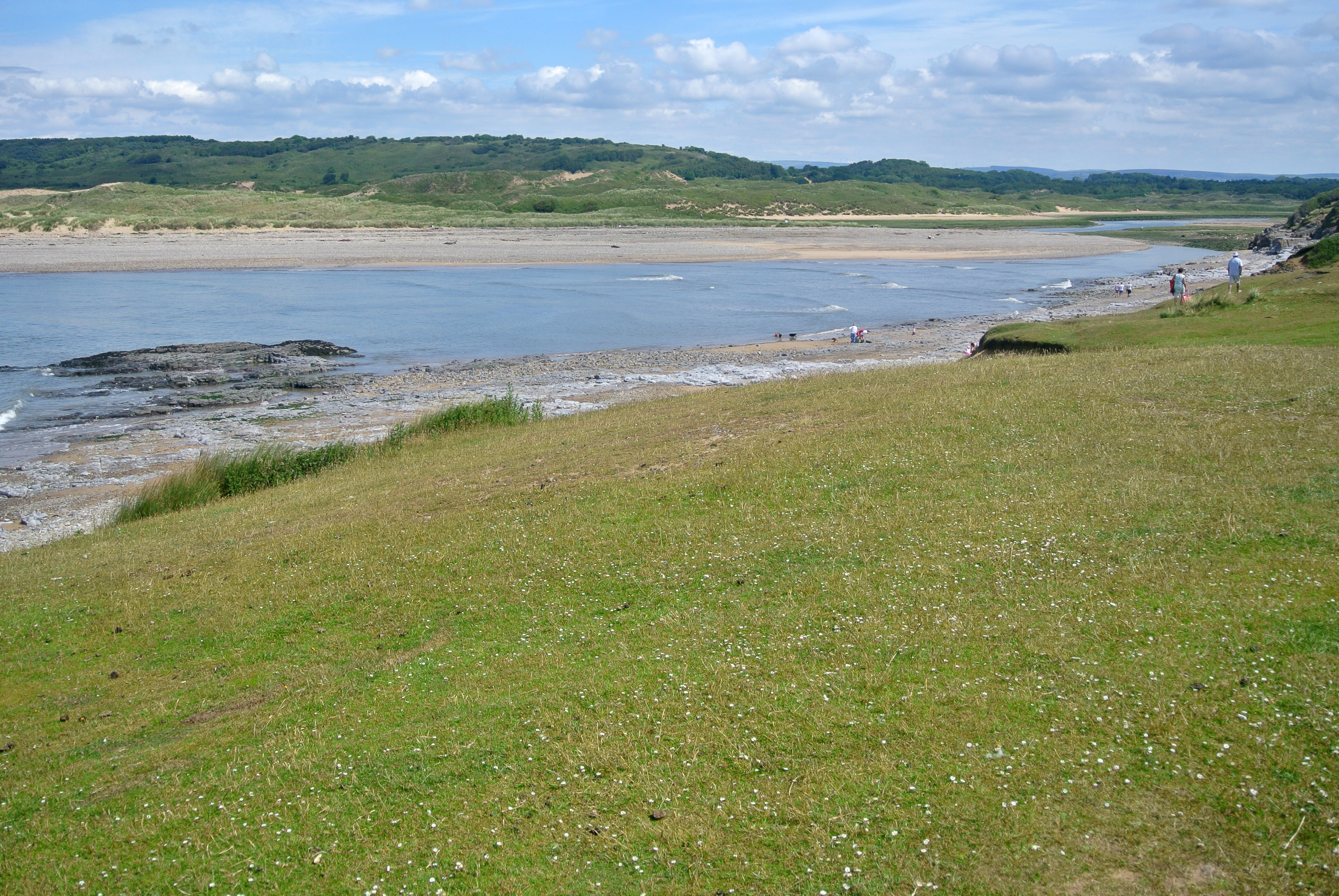
Mouth of the River Ogmore.

Until the 1970s raw sewage was discharged directly to the estuary. The construction of the Sewage treatment plant in 1974 provided full treatment to the 30:20 standard. In recent years UV treatment has been added to substantially reduce the bacterial and viral load of the treated effluent. However, in periods of heavy rain, emergency outfalls pour into the river, releasing some sewage.

== Fishery ==
In its industrial heyday, the Ogmore had no salmonid fish along much of its length, although brown trout survived in many of the smaller tributaries.

From the 1980s onwards, salmon and sea-trout started returning to the main river and the River Garw in ever-increasing numbers, but continued to avoid the chronically polluted Llynfi. However, even on the Llynfi, native brown trout numbers increased upstream of Tondu, and these were occasionally supplemented by stocked rainbow trout. In all parts of the river, trout can now be found, with salmon and sea trout almost everywhere. In addition eels remain common, and millers thumb, gudgeon, stone loach and minnow are found throughout.
