= Bridgend County Borough =

County borough in Wales

Bridgend County Borough Bwrdeistref Sirol Pen-y-bont ar Ogwr (Welsh)
- County borough
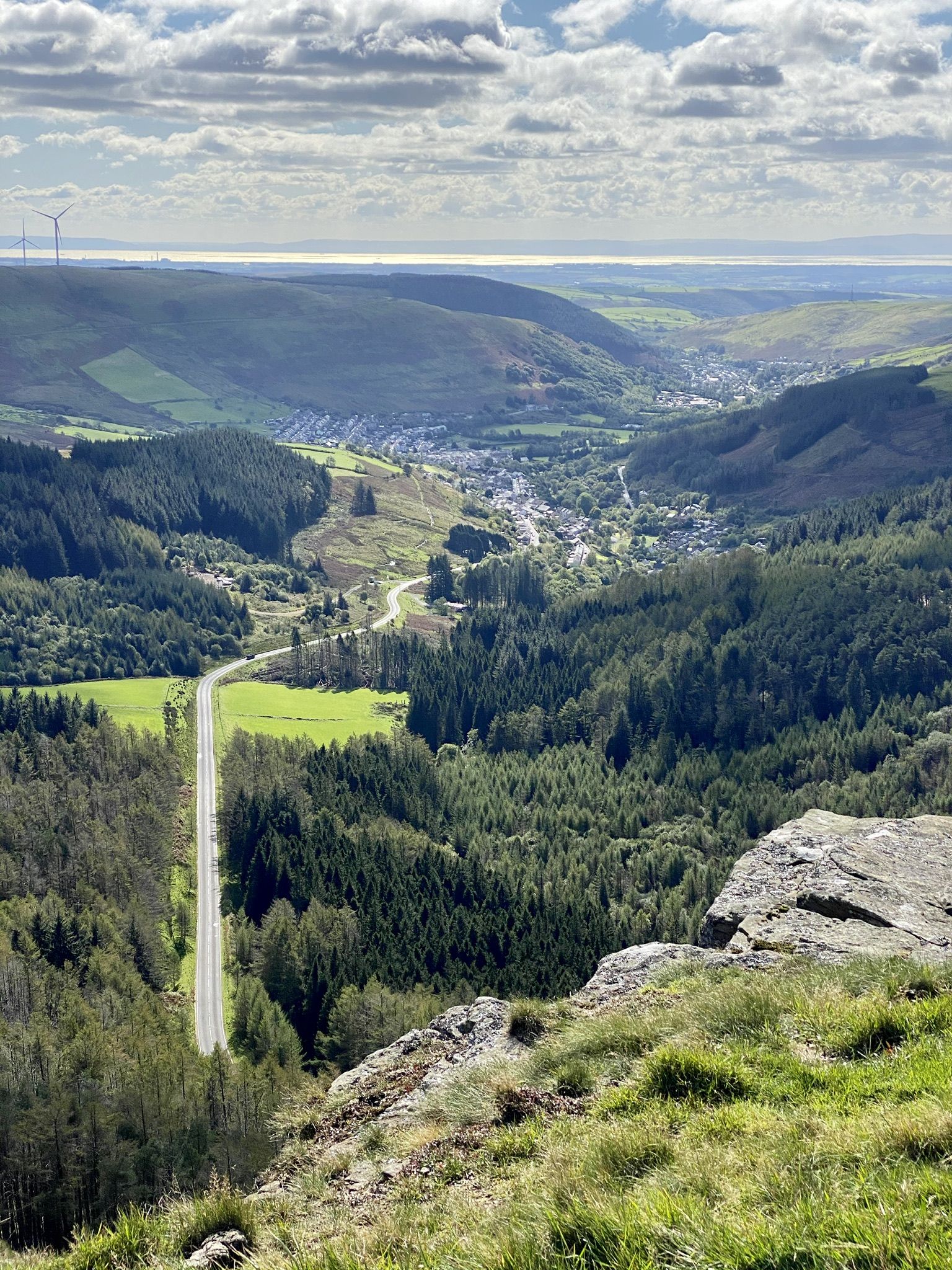
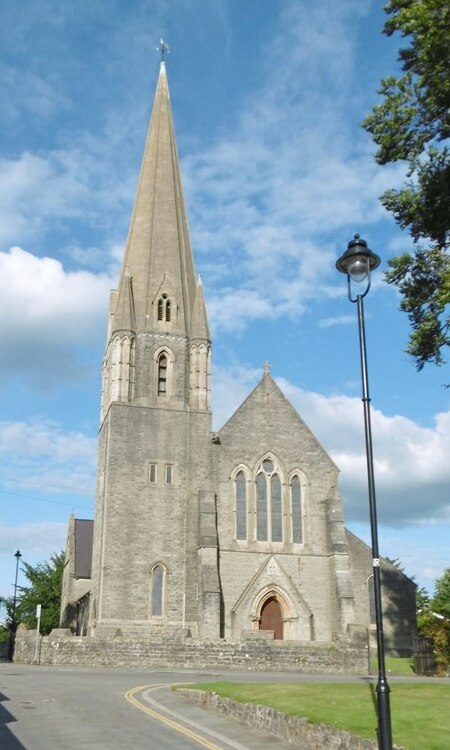
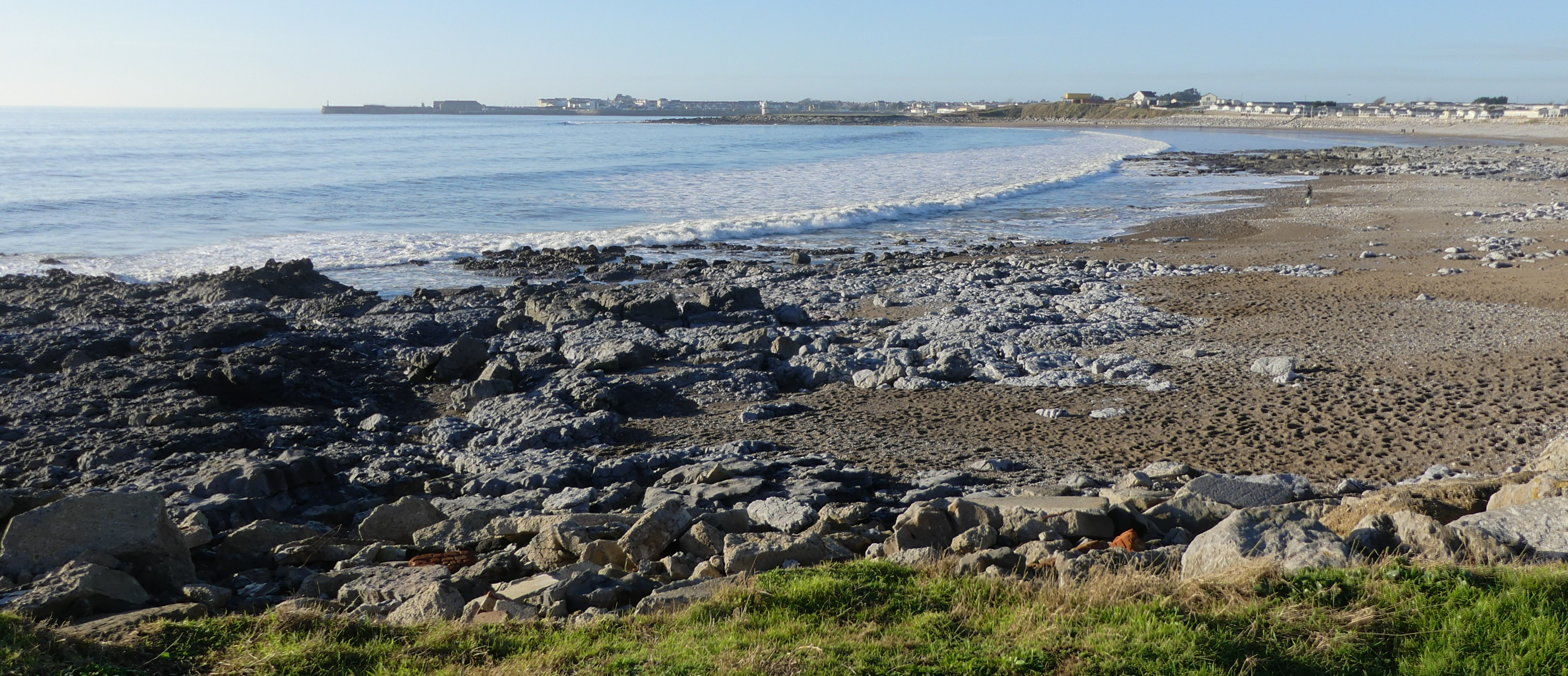
- Left to right: Ogmore Valley to Nant-y-moel; St Mary's Nolton Church, Bridgend; Trecco Bay from Newton Point, Porthcawl

- Coat of arms
- Motto: Onward With Confidence
- Bridgend shown within Wales
- Coordinates: 51°33′17″N 03°35′29″W
- Sovereign state: United Kingdom
- Country: Wales
- Preserved county: Mid Glamorgan
- Incorporated: 1 April 1996
- Administrative HQ: Bridgend

Government
  - Type: Principal council
  - Body: Bridgend County Borough Council
  - Control: Labour
  - MPs: 3 MPs: Chris Bryant (L); Chris Elmore (L); Stephen Kinnock (L)
  - MSs: 12 MSs: 6 in Afan Ogwr Rhondda; 6 in Pen-y-bont Bro Morgannwg

Area
  - Total: 97 sq mi (251 km^{2})
  - Rank: 17th

Population (2024)
  - Total: 147,530
  - Rank: 8th
  - Density: 1,520/sq mi (588/km^{2})

Welsh language (2021)
  - Speakers: 9.2%
  - Rank: 19th
- Time zone: UTC+0 (GMT)
  - Summer (DST): UTC+1 (BST)
- ISO 3166 code: GB-BGE
- GSS code: W06000013
- Website: bridgend.gov.uk

Bridgend County Borough (Welsh: Bwrdeistref Sirol Pen-y-bont ar Ogwr) is a county borough in the south-east of Wales. The county borough was formed in 1996 and contains the town of Bridgend, after which it is named.

The county borough lies at the geographical heart of south Wales. Its land area of 110 mi^{2} (285 km^{2}) stretches 12 miles (20 km) from east to west and occupies the Llynfi, Garw and Ogmore valleys. The largest town is Bridgend, followed by Maesteg and Porthcawl. The county borough lies on the River Ogmore and its tributaries, although the Ewenny and Ogwr Fach rivers form the border with the Vale of Glamorgan for much of their length.

== Composition ==
Bridgend County Borough was formed on 1 April 1996 under the Local Government (Wales) Act 1994. It includes all of the former Ogwr borough apart from the communities of Wick, St Brides Major and Ewenny, which went to Vale of Glamorgan. Bridgend County Borough is divided into 20 communities: Brackla, Bridgend, Cefn Cribwr, Coity Higher, Coychurch Higher, Coychurch Lower, Cornelly, Garw Valley, Laleston, Llangynwyd Lower, Llangynwyd Middle, Maesteg, Merthyr Mawr, Newcastle Higher, Ogmore Valley, Pencoed, Porthcawl, Pyle, St Bride's Minor and Ynysawdre. The communities of Brackla, Bridgend and Coychurch Lower make up the town of Bridgend.

== Governance ==
The region is governed by Bridgend County Borough Council, a principal council which has its offices in Bridgend.

The three UK parliament constituencies covering Bridgend County Borough (in pink). 1 = Aberafan Maesteg, 2 = Bridgend and 3 = Rhondda and Ogmore.

Since 2024, Bridgend County Borough is within three UK Parliament constituencies – Aberafan Maesteg, Bridgend, and Rhondda and Ogmore, and two Senedd constituencies – Afan Ogwr Rhondda and Pen-y-bont Bro Morgannwg.

== Parks and green spaces ==
Bryngarw Country Park is the largest (113 acres) country park in the county borough. It offers many amenity based areas including an adventure play area, barbecue and picnic areas, car park, cafe, visitor centre and toilets; as well as a patchwork of woodland, grassland and freshwater habitats. Bryngarw Country Park is a Grade II listed Historic Park and Garden and has been designated a 'Green Flag' Park since 2010. The Oriental Garden in the park has been noted as a 'Visit Wales Sustainable Tourism, Historic Gardens Centre of Excellence' by the 'One Historic Garden, Centre of Excellence'.

Kenfig National Nature Reserve with Glamorgan's largest natural lake, Kenfig Pool, is set on the edge of this area, with views from Sker beach across Swansea Bay to Gower. It is one of the finest wildlife habitats in Wales, and one of the last remnants of a huge dune system that once stretched along the coast from the River Ogmore to the Gower peninsula. The reserve is home to unique wild orchids, as well as insects and wildlife. Kenfig is one of the most important sites in Britain for nature conservation.

Parc Slip Nature Reserve is an environment of wetlands, woodlands and meadows at the Parc Slip Nature Park where there is a wealth of wildlife. After a century of coal mining on the site, the Wildlife Trust began to manage the land for nature in the late 1980s. Varied habitats have since been created and the park supports an increasing diversity of wildlife.

== Freedom of the Borough ==
The following people and military units have received the Freedom of the Borough of Bridgend:

=== Military units ===
- The Royal Welsh: 30 August 2008
- 2 Company 1st Battalion The Welsh Guards: 11 May 2011

== Demographics ==
=== Ethnicity ===
As of the 2021 United Kingdom census, the county borough's ethnic groups are as follows:

| Ethnic group | Percentage |
|---|---|
| White | 96.8% |
| Asian | 1.5% |
| Mixed | 1.2% |
| Black | 0.3% |
| Other | 0.3% |

=== Religion ===
As of the 2021 United Kingdom census, the county borough's religious make-up is as follows:

| Religion | |
|---|---|
| No religion | 52.3% |
| Christianity | 40.4% |
| Islam | 0.5% |
| Other | 0.5% |
| Buddhism | 0.3% |
| Hinduism | 0.2% |
| Sikhism | 0.1% |
| Judaism | 0.1% |
| not stated | 5.6% |

== See also ==
- List of places in Bridgend County Borough
- List of scheduled monuments in Bridgend County Borough
