= St Brides Major (community) =

St Brides Major: Welsh: Sant-y-Brid
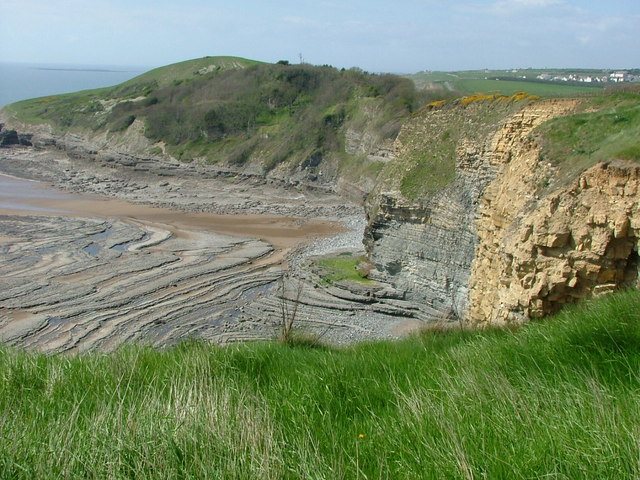
- Coastal cliffs at Southerndown, St Brides Major

- Location within the Vale of Glamorgan
- Area: 20.44 km^{2} (7.89 sq mi)
- Population: 1,940
  - Density: 95/km^{2} (250/sq mi)
- Principal area: Vale of Glamorgan
- Country: Wales
- Sovereign state: United Kingdom
- Police: South Wales
- Fire: South Wales
- Ambulance: Welsh
- List of places UK Wales Vale of Glamorgan 51.4604°N 3.5925°W Map of the community

St Brides Major (Welsh: Sant-y-Brid) is a community on the western edge of the Vale of Glamorgan, South Wales. Its largest settlement is the village of St Brides Major, and also includes the villages of Ogmore-by-Sea and Southerndown, and the hamlets of Ogmore Village, Castle-upon-Alun, Heol-y-Mynydd, Norton and Pont-yr-Brown It is notable for coastal geology and scenery, limestone downlands and fossilised primitive mammals, sea cliffs and beaches, two Iron Age hillforts, three medieval castle sites, (one, Ogmore Castle, still extant), two stepping stone river crossings and a clapper bridge. Three long distance paths cross the community. It is the western limit of the Vale of Glamorgan Heritage Coast, and has a visitor centre and tourist facilities.

== Geology and Landscape ==
5 kilometres (3.1 mi) of south-west facing coastline forms one side of the community. This is an SSSI and part of the Vale of Glamorgan Heritage Coast, with rocky limestone cliffs, broad sandy beaches and deeply fissured wave-cut platforms. Along the northern boundary are the steep-sided valleys of the Rivers Ogmore and Ewenny. The high ground above these valleys includes large areas of common grazing land, on thin limestone soils, including Old Castle Down SSSI. The southern part of the community includes the village of St Brides Major, the Dunraven estate and Clemenstone Meadow SSSI.

=== Southerndown Coast SSSI ===
Much of the coastline of the community is designated as the Southerndown Coast SSSI, both for its geology and botanic value. The 153 hectares (380 acres) stretch of shore, cliff, cliff-top, and several short, steep valleys, reveal the local geological strata. Carboniferous Limestone from upwards of 300 million years ago lies at the present sea level. By the Triassic period, 200 million years ago, these rocks were already tilted and eroded. A new deposition phase created more sedimentary rocks, including a red Triassic conglomerate, and a creamy white Jurassic limestone known as Sutton Stone, a freestone much sought after for carved stonework, and so widely quarried where it occurs.

=== Rivers and pools ===
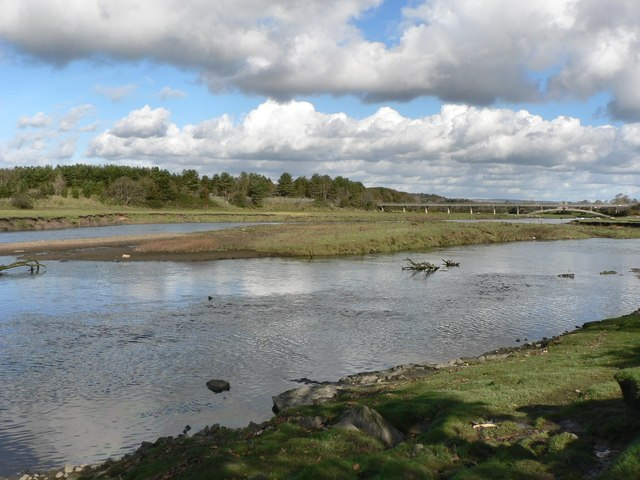
Portobello Island on the River Ogmore

Four rivers feature in the eastern, northern and western boundaries of the community, tributaries one into another. In the east the modest Clemenstone Brook, and other small channels drain from wetlands at the eastern extremity of the community, including the Clemenstone Meadow SSSI. These join the Afon Alun near Castle-upon-Alun. The River Alun forms the northern boundary for 5 kilometres (3.1 miles) as it flows north-west through the Alun Gorge, a deeply incised meandering valley, cut by glacial meltwater after the last ice age. It joins the River Ewenny south of Ewenny. The River Ewenny then flows due west, and is the boundary of both the community and the county borough. Flowing through Ogmore Moor, and between Ogmore village and Ogmore Castle, it joins the River Ogmore, which in turn is the county boundary, flowing south-west for 2.5 kilometres (1.6 mi) between the steep rough limestone grassland of Ogmore Down and the vast sand dunes of Merthyr Mawr Common, to join the Bristol Channel through the broad sands of 'The Flats'.

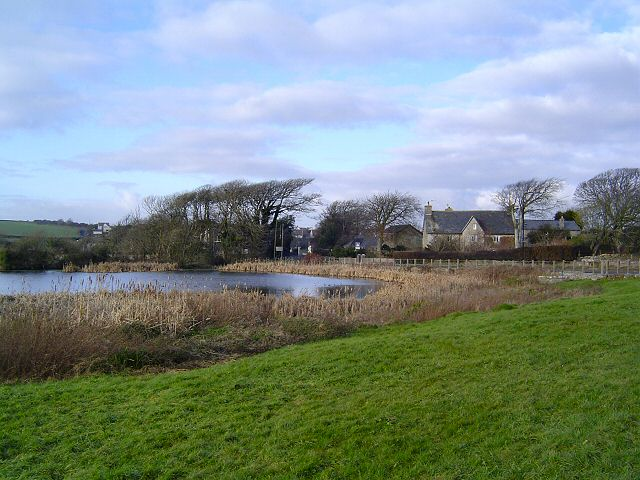
Pwll y Mêr, St Brides Major

The largest area of standing water is Pwll y Mêr. This is a village pond within the St Brides Major Conservation Area. The outflow from the pool enters a crevice in the limestone to join the Afon Dawel (Silent River), an underground stream.

=== Limestone Downs ===
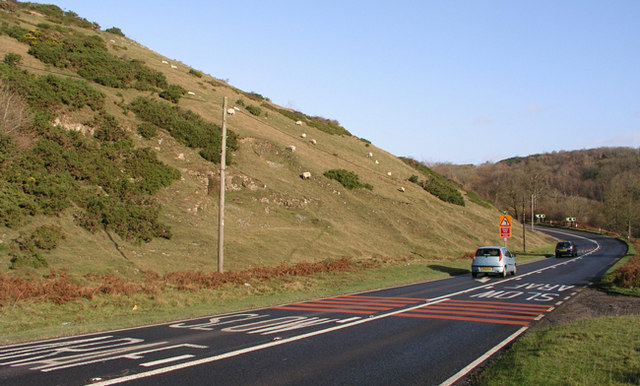
B4265 through St Brides Gorge, between Beacons Down and Old Castle Down

Ogmore Down occupies the northern part of the community, and is a large area of common grazing land. Irregular boundaries to the unenclosed land show where medieval encroachments occurred, and the northeastern part of the common, near Ogmore Village, is now the Southerndown Golf Club, a championship standard golf course, laid out in 1904. The steep valley sides above the River Ewenny are wooded, but most of the unenclosed common is limestone heath grassland, notable for high brown fritillary butterflies. South of Ogmore Down are two hills just over 100 metres (330 ft) above sea level. To the west is Beacons Down (101 metres (331 ft)), and to the east, separated by the St Brides Gorge, is Old Castle Down (102 metres (335 ft)). Old Castle Down is a 79-hectare (200-acre) SSSI, designated for both its Carboniferous limestone geology and the range of grassland habitats that support rare wildflowers and invertebrates. Duchy Quarry, a disused quarry on the eastern slopes of the hill, above the Alun Gorge, reveals the particular geological feature of the SSSI. The Carboniferous limestone acquired deep cracks and fissures, which then filled up with Jurassic sediments in which are found fossilised remains of reptiles and primitive mammals. Most notable was the 1949 discovery of teeth of the Morganucodon.

=== Ewenny and Pant Quarries SSSI ===
Jurassic clay infill accumulated in the Carboniferous limestone fissures. The limestone is quarried at these two sites (Pant Quarry near Castle-upon-Alun, Ewenny Quarry close by in Ewenny community) the clay infill is recorded, stored, and then examined by geologists. The infill has identified the most complete fossilised remains of species of primitive mammals anywhere on earth.

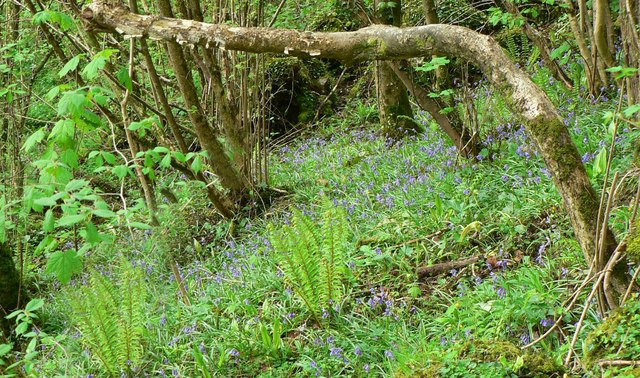
Fresh ferns and bluebells. Castle-upon-Alun.

=== Coed y Bwl SSSI ===
The slopes west of the River Alun include the Coed y Bwl Nature Reserve, a SSSI known locally as Wild Daffodil Wood after its most distinctive feature, a large area of wild daffodils planted in the 19th century, although wood anemone and bluebells are also abundant, with a tree cover of ash woodland. The reserve is managed by the Wildlife Trust of South and West Wales, and covers 2.4 hectares (5.9 acres). It is open to public, with a main entrance near Castle-upon-Alun at (51.4628°N 3.57279°W, OS grid Ref. SS90847493).

== Settlement and land use ==
Prehistoric settlement

A stone axe from the early Neolithic period was found near Ogmore-by-Sea, suggesting human activity some 6,000 years ago. However the earliest direct evidence of habitation within the community is of two burial mounds from the Bronze Age, on the limestone hills of Beacons Down (51.4641°N 3.6078°W, SS884751). The best preserved, a scheduled monument, is a low bracken-covered mound on common land near the road at Heol y Mynydd. A group of 5 ploughed-out barrows is also tentatively identified in a field south of St Brides Major village.

There are two scheduled monuments from the Iron Age, both hillforts:

Dunraven Castle Hillfort
(51.4425°N 3.6025°W, OS grid Ref. SS887727) This is a promontory fort, 60 metres (200 ft) above the sea on the Trwyn y Witch headland. The northern half of the enclosed area has eroded away, and later castles and then a mansion were built over part of the ramparts. Within the surviving enclosed land there is evidence of 21 roundhouses.
Promontory Fort on Fleming's Down
(51.4794°N 3.6009°W, OS grid ref. SS889768) This inland promontory fort, is on a natural promontory overlooking the Ewenny valley, at its confluence with the River Ogmore. It has a substantial defensive earthwork enclosing 0.5 hectares (1.2 acres), and it may be that some of the scarp slopes have been steepened for better defence.
Inhumations
In 1818 workmen cam across three burials with a substantial collection of items from the very end of the Iron Age: knives, spear heads, ornate enamelled helmets, and thick copper skull-caps. The items were recorded at the time, but lost afterwards. There is no scheduled site as the location within the parish was not recorded, although in 2001, Old Castle Down was tentatively identified. Writing in 1925, Mortimer Wheeler described the finds as "the richest and most remarkable of their kind known to have been discovered in Britain".
Enclosures
Three Iron Age enclosures are known from cropmarks, in fields inland from the Trwyn y Witch headland.

Roman period

There is very little indication as to Roman period habitation in St Brides Major community. A field system on Beacons Down (51.4675°N 3.6037°W, OS grid ref. SS887755) may indicate a farmstead from this period, cropmarks at Pitcot Farm (51.4506°N 3.5887°W, OS grid ref. SS887755) have been suggested as being a Roman villa, and Roman pottery has been found at Castle-upon-Alun (51.4582°N 3.5670°W, OS grid ref. SS912744).

Medieval period

From the pre-Norman period, two parts of two stone crosses are known. At Ogmore Castle, an 11th-century stone cross fragment was found in 1929. Now in the National Museum of Wales, this is a wide 'stem' which would once have included a circular cross-head. (See the Cross of Grutne for a comparable example). It has a tenon at the bottom, for slotting into a base, and has inscriptions on both wide sides. Both are highly abbreviated and abraded, so the transcriptions are speculative in places, but one side may read, [--] EST[--] QUOD DED[IT] ARTHMAIL AGRUM DO ET GLIGUIS ET NERTAT ET FILIE SU[A], which would translate as "Be it [known to all men] that Arthmail gave (this) field to God and Glywys and Nertat and his daughter". The other, even more damaged, may have, [IN NOMINE]/ DI SUM(M)I CRO/S(?) IH(ES)U(?) GENTI/ BRANCUT/ BRANCIE(?)/ [FILI ], "In the Name of the Most High God, the Cross of Jesus for the family of Brancu, (son of) Brancia".

Croes Antoni
(51.4648°N 3.5946°W, OS grid ref. SS893751) This scheduled monument is a heavily weathered socket-stone for a stone cross. It is probably pre-Norman, and is set in the ground beside the road north of St Brides Major village, with an accompanying name plaque.

The paucity of early medieval settlement evidence is most probably due to continuity of use. The Iron Age sites may have continued in use well beyond the Roman period, and the later medieval sites are probably built on earlier settlements. Norman features are found in St Bridget's Church and Ogmore Castle. The following are medieval Scheduled Monuments:-

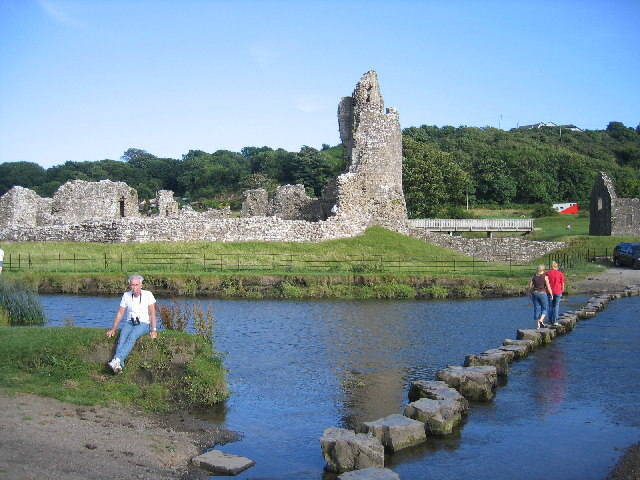
Ogmore Castle and Stepping Stones

Ogmore Castle
(51.4805°N 3.6115°W, SS881769). The first building was in place by 1117, and included a tidal moat. The stone keep claims to be "one of the oldest Norman stone buildings in South East Wales". Built by the Londres family, the castle passed by marriage to Henry of Lancaster, and became crown property in 1399. As well as a scheduled monument it is a grade I listed building, and substantial ruined walls remain, in a picturesque location beside the River Ewenny

Ogmore Stepping Stones
(51.4808°N 3.6122°W, SS881769). This is a rare survival of a complete medieval stepping stone river crossing. The 33 square blocks provide pedestrian access across the River Ewenny near Ogmore Castle

Stepsau Duon
(51.4695°N 3.5722°W, SS908756) Stepping stones also called 'Stepson Downs' and 'Pant y Brown', these are 15 stone steps across the Afon Alun, alongside a ford near Castle-upon-Alun.

Churchyard Cross
(51.4633°N 3.593°W, SS894750) Cross, Medieval stone cross shaft and socket, on a base of six steps, in St Bridget's Churchyard.

St Bridget's Church itself, a grade II* listed building, is first documented in 1141, with a Norman chancel arch as its earliest remaining feature. It is now part of a combined parish of Ewenny and St Brides Major, having been the parish church of St Brides Major.

Dunraven Castle, a Victorian mansion at Trwyn y Witch headland, was demolished in 1962. Before its development as a castellated mansion it appears to have been a medieval castle, and then a manor house. Although it was within the Norman Lordship of the de Londres of Ogmore, it was granted to the Butler family (or Boteler), reputedly in return for faithful service when Ogmore Castle was under attack. The Butlers have various tombs in St Bridget's Church from the 12th to 16th centuries.

Oldcastle-upon-Alun (51.4619°N 3.56853°W, SS91137483) is a medieval castle or fortification with little documentation. It appears under that name as far back as the mid-12th century. It gives its name to the hamlet of Castle-upon-Alun where two medieval doorways re-use dressed stone apparently from the stone castle, and also to Old Castle Down, the hillside above the hamlet.

St Brides Major (clustered around St Bridget's Church), Ogmore village (near Ogmore Castle), Southerndown (on the Dunraven estate), and Castle-upon-Alun (near the castle at Oldcastle-upon-Alun) are the four medieval settlements. Ogmore-by-Sea, by contrast, is a 19th-century settlement (having been a scatter of three cottages in 1840. Its expansion was due to seaside holiday makers, although it only acquired official recognition as a name in 1920, when St Brides Major parish was divided into three wards, by which time Ogmore-by-Sea was a small but thriving resort.

== Economy ==
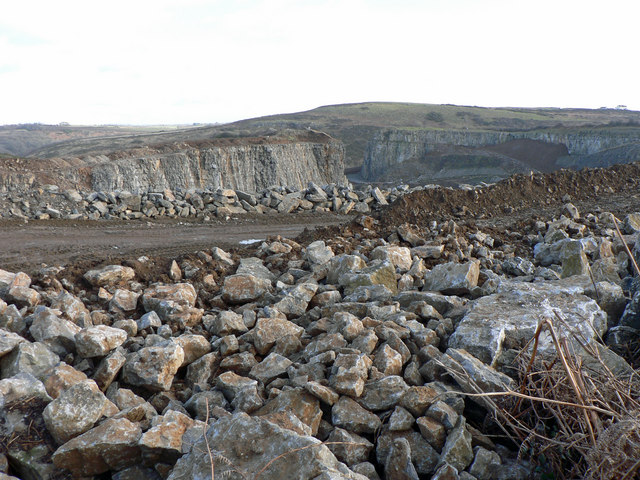
Pant Quarry, St Bride's Major

Agriculture has been the traditional mainstay of the local economy, with farms being historically found in all the old villages, plus the hamlets of Pitcot, Durval, Heol-y-Mynydd, Norton and Pont-yr-Brown and isolated farms. Mining and quarrying have also been carried on in various parts of the community. Along the coast both Sutton Stone (a stone valued for its lack of grain and slow hardening once it is exposed to air, so it can be carved and sawn) and lead and other minerals have been extracted. Inland, the Duchy quarry near Castle-upon-Alun is now disused, but two large quarries, the Pant Quarry (operated by Tarmac Group) and Lithalun Quarry (operated by Hanson plc) produce both aggregates and cement from the limestone (along with the nearby Ewenny Quarry, in Ewenny community, operated by Lafarge Aggregates).

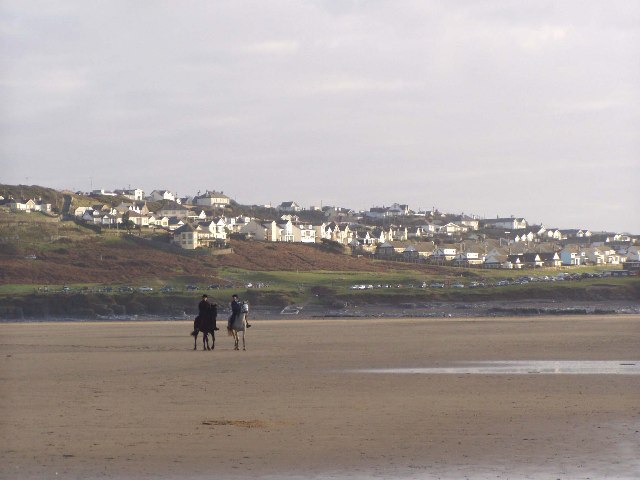
Ogmore by Sea from The Flats

Tourism is the other substantial employment in the community. Ogmore-by-Sea and Southerndown have had hotels, inns and restaurants since the mid-19th century, due to the popularity of the rugged coastline, and continue to provide guest houses, holiday cottages, and even tipi accommodation within the community. The presence of the prestigious Southerndown Golf Club has provided an added attraction since 1905.

== Transport ==
Several ancient trackways run across the community. Heol-y-Milwyr (The Soldiers' Way) ran from Merthyr Mawr to St Brides Major via Ogmore Castle and Croes Antoni. The Heol-y-mynydd goes up onto the downs via a valley called Pant Mari Flanders, which also has a medieval well. Other trackways, Heol-y-slough and Heol Las also cross the downs.

The Vale of Glamorgan Line railway runs through the northern edge of the community, travelling between Cardiff and Bridgend. The line opened in 1897, with Southerndown Road station at Croes Cwta, east of Castle-upon-Alun (51.4609°N 3.5603°W, SS917747) The station closed in 1961, and the line itself closed to passenger traffic in 1964, but resumed a passenger service in 2005, although the station did not re-open.

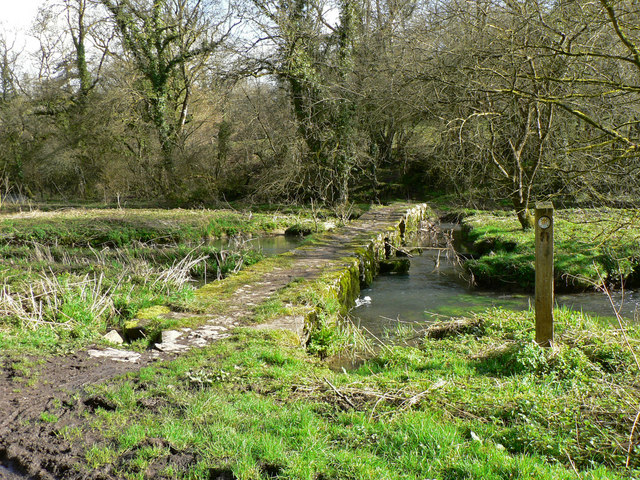
Clapper Bridge over the Afon Alun on the Valeways Heritage Trail

Three long-distance footpaths cross the community.

The South Wales and Severn Estuary section of the Wales Coast Path runs for some 6 kilometres (3.7 mi) from Ogmore Castle to the community boundary south of Trwyn y Witch, taking in the length of the Southerndown Coast SSSI.

The Valeways Millennium Heritage Trail includes a section of the coast path, and also takes in the village of St Brides Major and Castle-upon-Alun, crossing the Alun via the Clapper bridge.

The 13 kilometres (8.1 mi) Bridgend Circular Walk enters the community (if travelling clockwise) over the Stepsau Duon stepping stones, and takes a route over the Downs, descending along Heol-y-Milwyr to Ogmore.

=== Bridges and river crossings ===
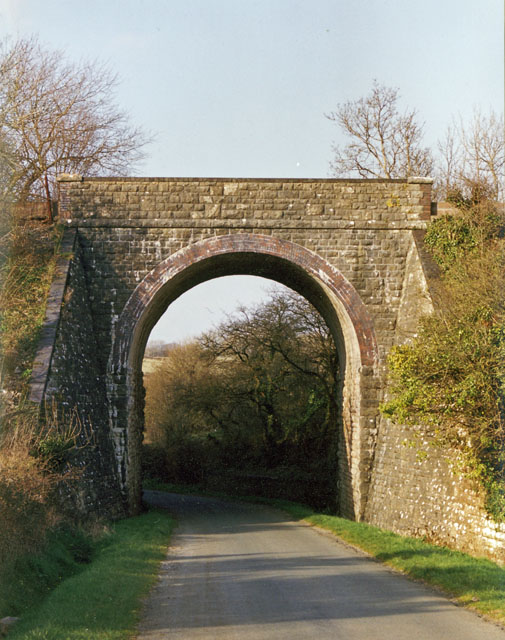
Railway Bridge at Croes-Cwtta, east of Castle-upon-Alun

There are no bridges over the Ewenny or Ogmore rivers within the community that allow vehicle access northwards. The nearest crossing is inland at Ewenny. There are pedestrian crossings northwards. The Ogmore Castle stepping stones are passable provided tides and river flows are not high. A footbridge over the River Ewenny 400 metres (440 yd) upstream gives safe access along the coast path. Downstream, a substantial modern bridge over the River Ogmore gives access to a sewage works, but is not a through route. The only roads out of the community are therefore to the east and south-east. The B4265 south-east to Wick is the only route out of the community that doesn't cross a river or stream. Two minor roads cross the Clemenstone Brook, one at Heol Shwlac, the other at Pont Fach. Pont Groes Gwta (51.4614°N 3.5584°W, OS grid ref.SS91837475), a two-arched 18th-century stone bridge, crosses the Afon Alun east of Castle-upon-Alun. Stepsau Duon stepping stones and a ford also cross the Alun, as described above, and further west the Clapper bridge provides a pedestrian crossing of the Alun at 51.4641°N 3.57062°W, OS grid ref.SS9099750. Five openings through the 18th-century raised path allow the stream through, with flat stone lintels. Further downstream, the roads east from St Brides Major village crosses the Alun at Pontalun, and the road from Ogmore crosses it at the confluence with the River Ewenny, both by inconspicuous modern bridges.

The railway, built in 1885, has two bridges over minor roads, and four times crosses the Afon Alun over impressive brick arches in its journey along the Alun valley.

== Religion ==
The 12th-century Church of St Bridget, in St Brides Major is now in the combined Parish of Ewenny and St Brides Major, a benefice of the Church in Wales within Bridgend deanery. For much of its history it was a Parish in its own right, co-inciding with the civil parish and more recently community boundaries. Until the Reformation the Church was, along with Ewenny Priory and other local churches, a possession of Gloucester Abbey, both having been given to the abbey in 1141. It contains a number of medieval tombs and memorials, but the building itself was heavily restored by Egbert Moxham in 1851.

The other Anglican Church within the parish is All Saints, Southerndown. Built in 1968 alongside the cricket pitch, (51.4534°N 3.61063°W, OS grid ref.SS88187395) this replaced a corrugated iron building that was originally a reading room for the up-market visitors to Southerndown. Built in 1876, it began holding summertime services under the name Southerndown Mission from 1877, and was holding regular Sunday school meetings by 1888. The tin hall lasted until 1968 when a road widening scheme required its demolition, and a replacement Church was built.

Ogmore-By-Sea Evangelical Church, Church Close, off Hazelwood, (51.4617°N 3.63015°W, OS grid ref.SS86857490) was built in 1968, having previously met in the founder's garage.

There were two non-conformist Chapels within St Brides Major village. Bryn Sion Calvinistic Methodist Chapel, Penylan Road, was built in 1859, replacing a building of 1824. It closed in 1987 and is now a house. Horeb Baptist Church, Ewenny Road, was built in 1863 and closed in 2003.

The remains of a medieval chapel stand in a remote location on Ogmore Down. (51.4681°N 3.60820°W, OS grid ref.SS88397557) This small single roomed building, local tradition suggests, was a penance chapel of Margam Abbey, a place where monks from the Abbey would spend time reflecting on their misdeeds.

== Boundary campaign ==
In 2009 a campaign by residents of Ogmore-by-Sea to create two communities, St Brides Major and Ogmore-by-Sea, was presented to the Boundary Commission. After consultation, with petitions on both sides being collected, the Commission recommended no change.
