= Southerndown Coast =

Coastline in the Vale of Glamorgan, Wales

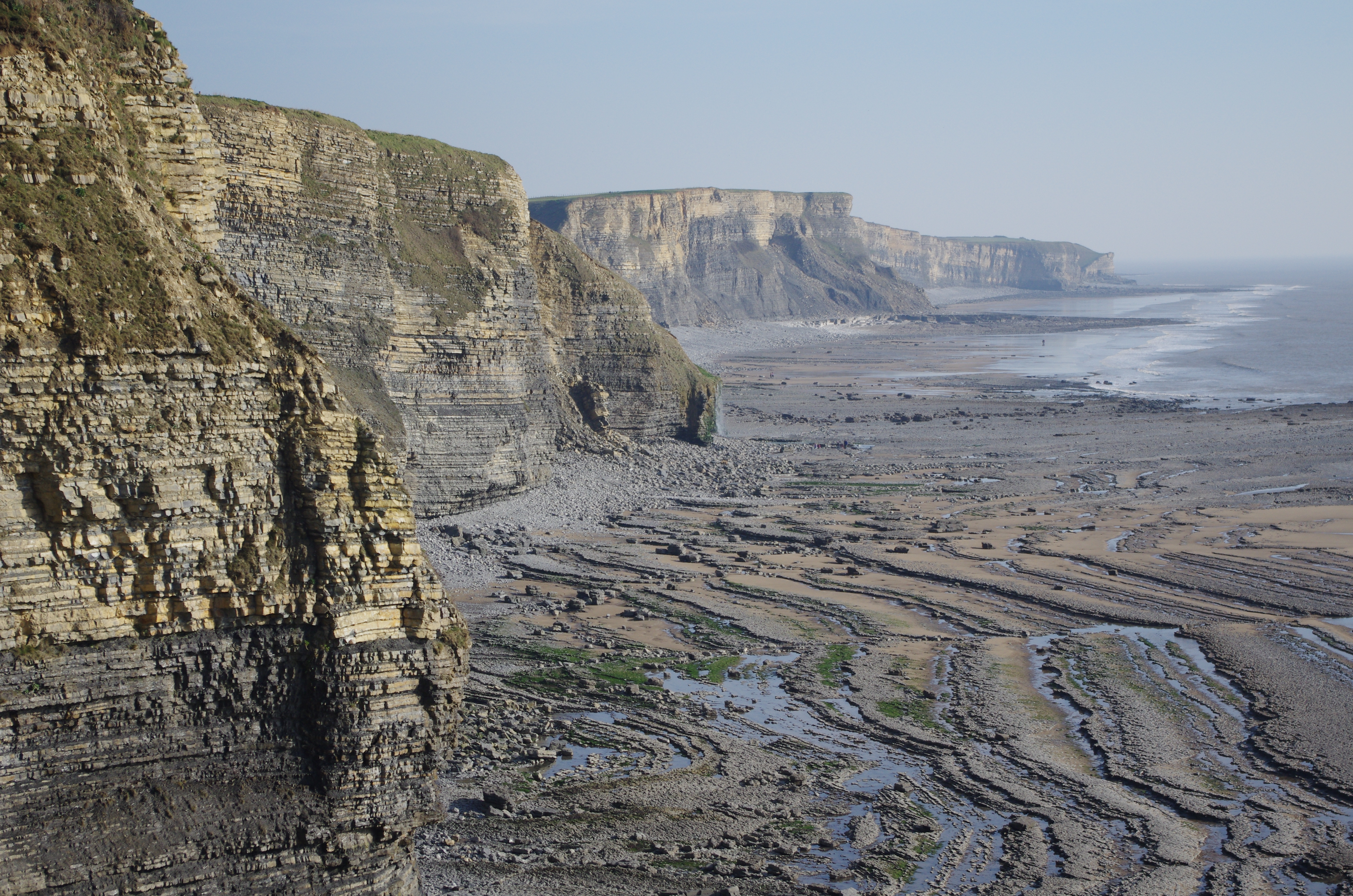
Cliffs on the Glamorgan Heritage Coast south of Dunraven Park.

Southerndown Coast is a Site of Special Scientific Interest (SSSI) in St Brides Major community, in the Vale of Glamorgan, South Wales. It forms part of the Glamorgan Heritage Coast, bordered by the Monknash Coast to the southeast. The nearby villages are Southerndown and Ogmore-by-Sea. The SSSI extends over 5 kilometres (3 miles) of south-west facing coastline, with rocky limestone cliffs, broad beaches and deeply fissured wave-cut platforms.

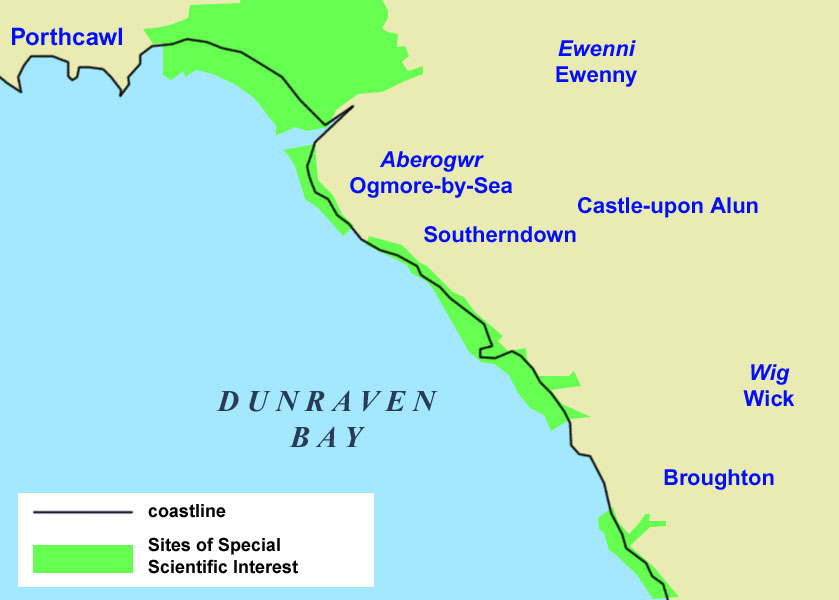
A map of the Southerndown Coast indicating the areas of Sites of Special Scientific Interest.

== Southerndown Coast SSSI ==
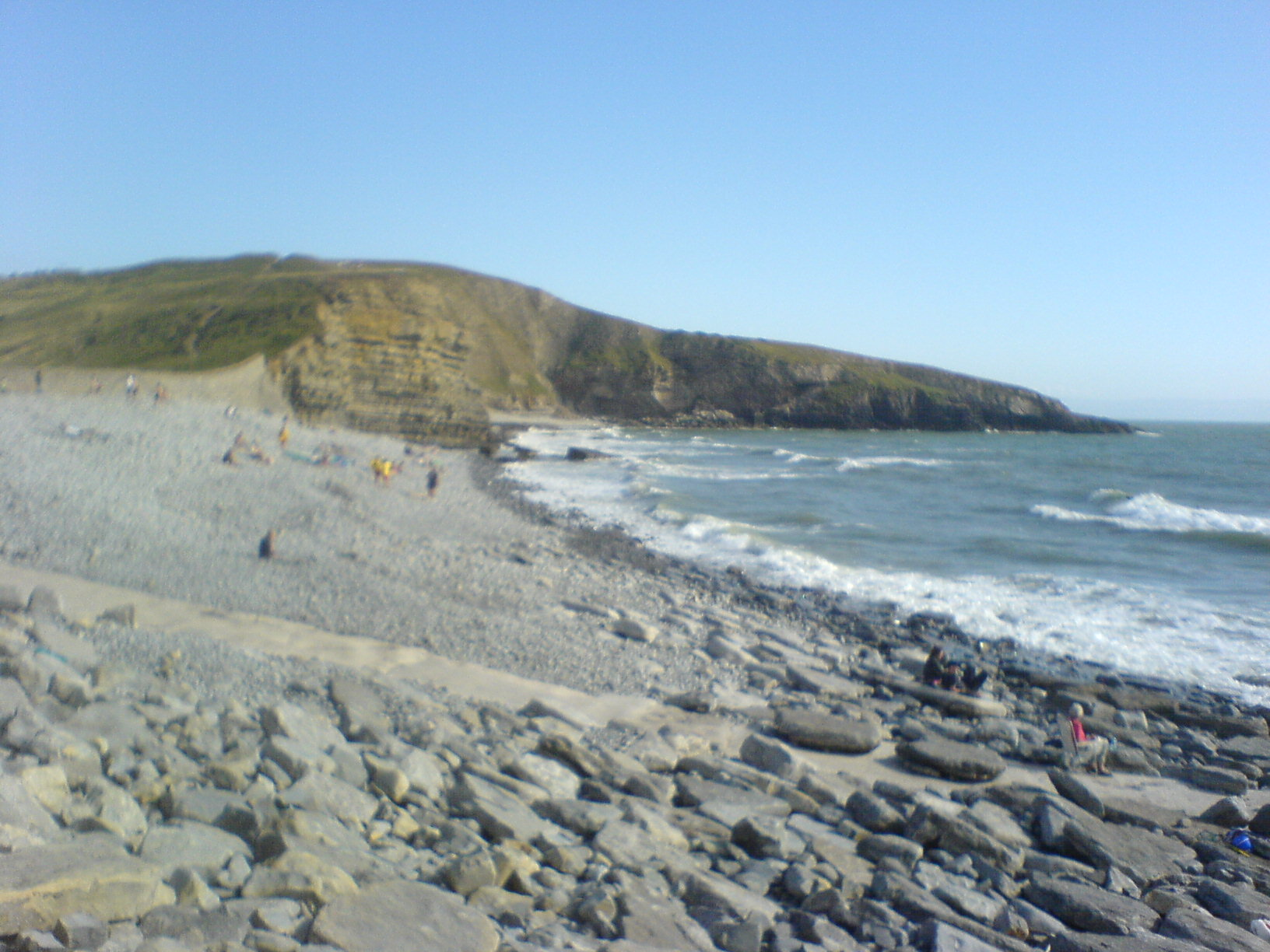
Southerndown Coast

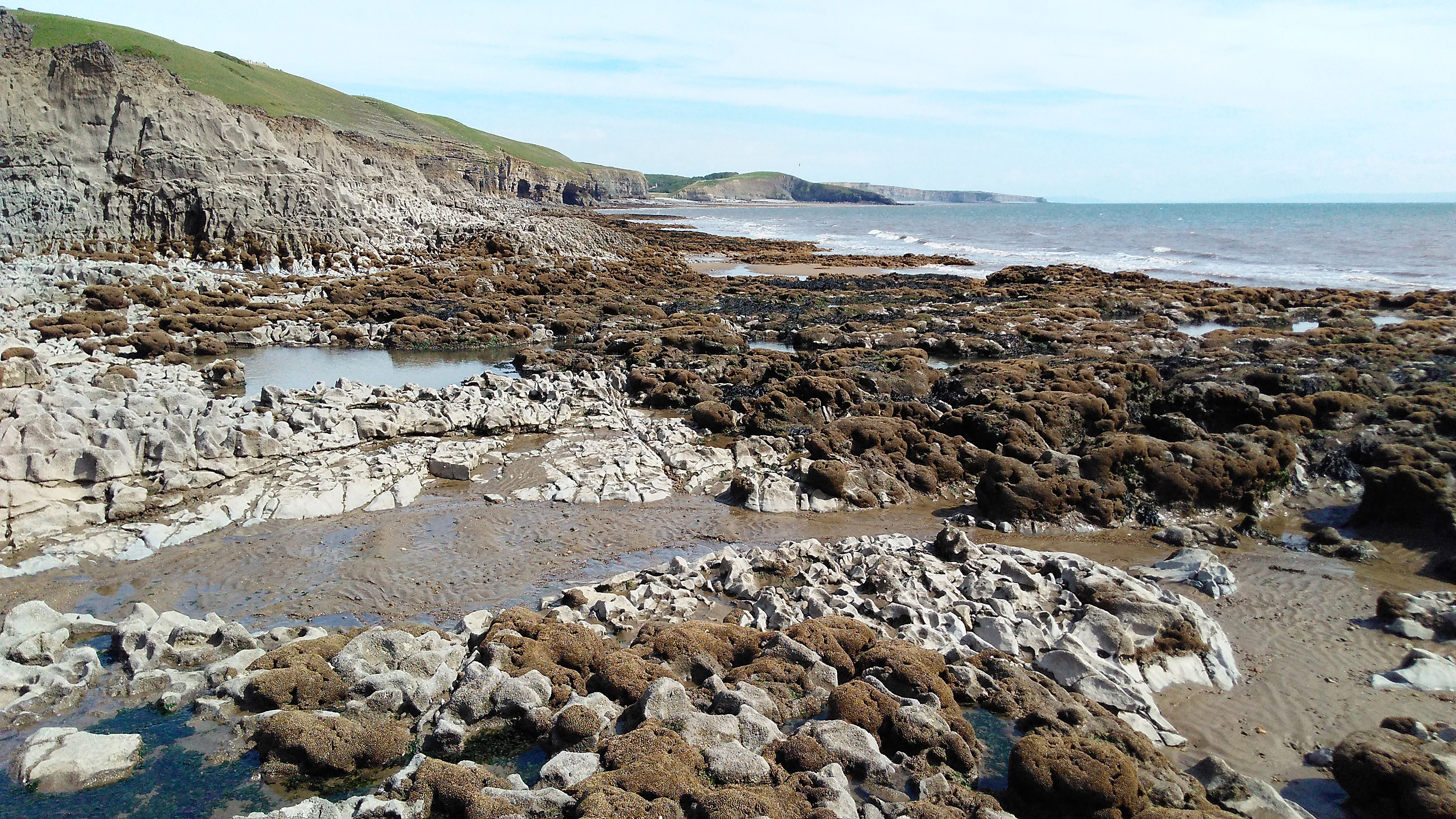
The Southerndown Coast, from the foreshore south of Ogmore, looking south east.

The 153 hectares (380 acres) stretch of shore, cliff, cliff-top, and several short, steep valleys, are designated an SSSI for their geological and botanical value. The cliffs expose the Jurassic geological strata and some of the underlying Carboniferous Limestone, the latter dating from between 359 and c. 330 million years ago. By the Triassic period, 200 million years ago, the Carboniferous rocks had already been tilted and eroded. A new deposition phase created more sedimentary rocks, including a red Triassic conglomerate, and a creamy white Jurassic limestone known as Sutton Stone, a freestone much sought after for carved stonework, and so widely quarried where it occurs. The SSSI is in two parts. The northern section is the wave-cut platform alongside Ogmore-by-Sea. The southern section, with a short gap, covers both the intertidal areas and the cliffs and grassy cliff-tops of Dunraven Bay, Trwyn y Witch headland and the valleys and shoreline of Cwm Mawr and Cwm Bach. The whole length of the SSSI is traversed by the South Wales section of the Wales Coast Path.

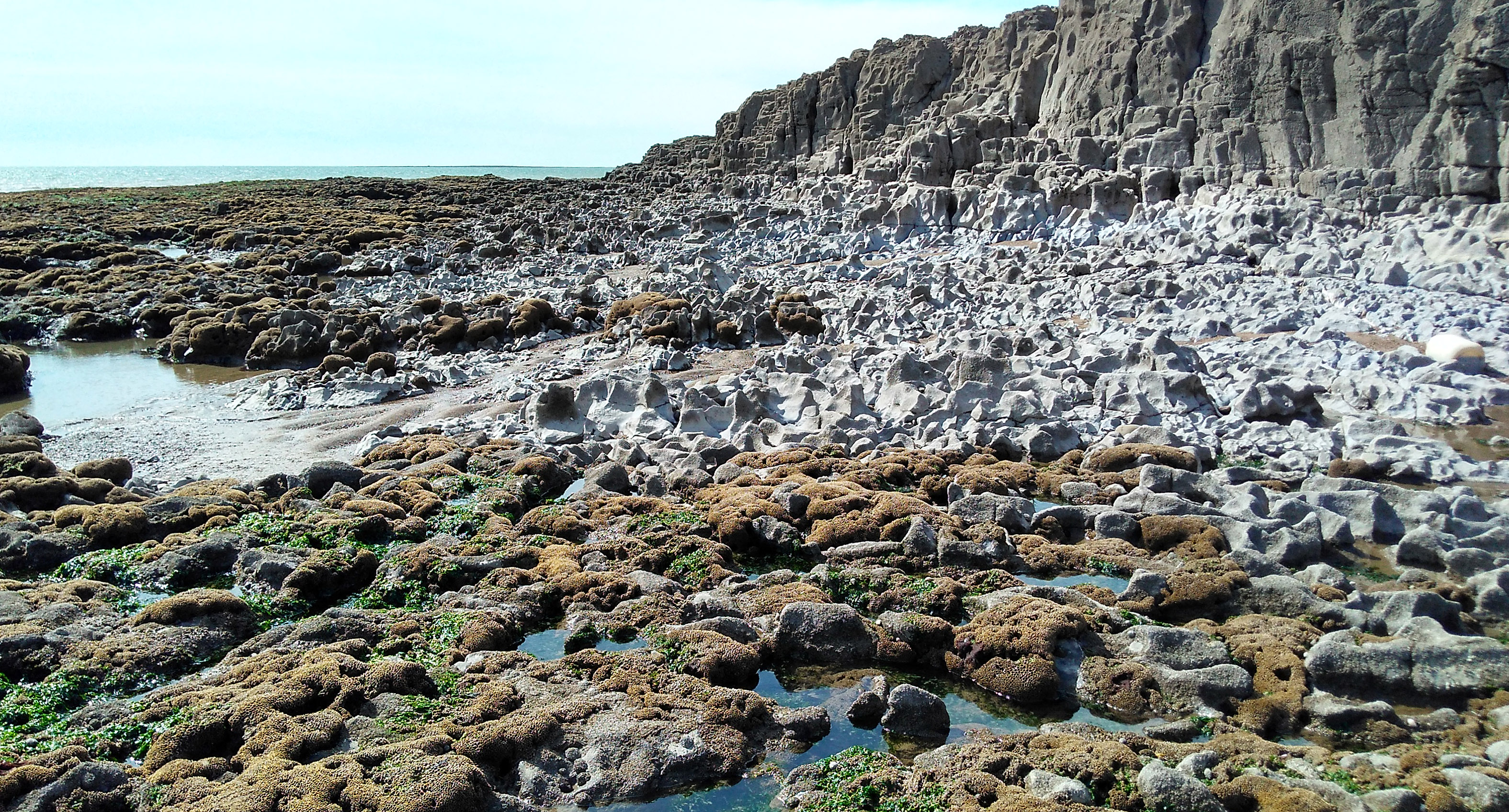
Southerndown coast looking west-northwest, with the limestone pavement to the right

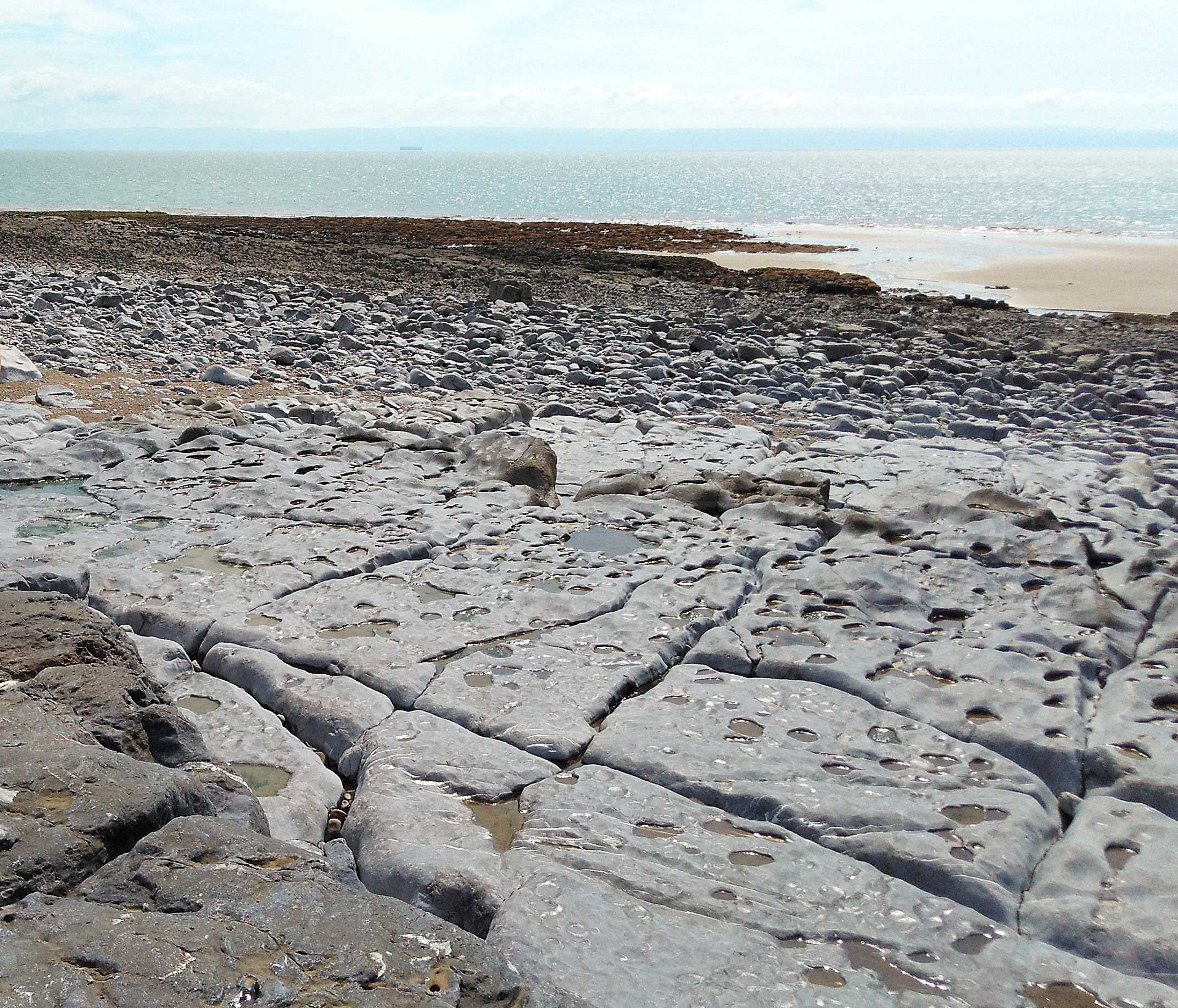
Part of the limestone pavement near Ogmore, and the foreshore beyond

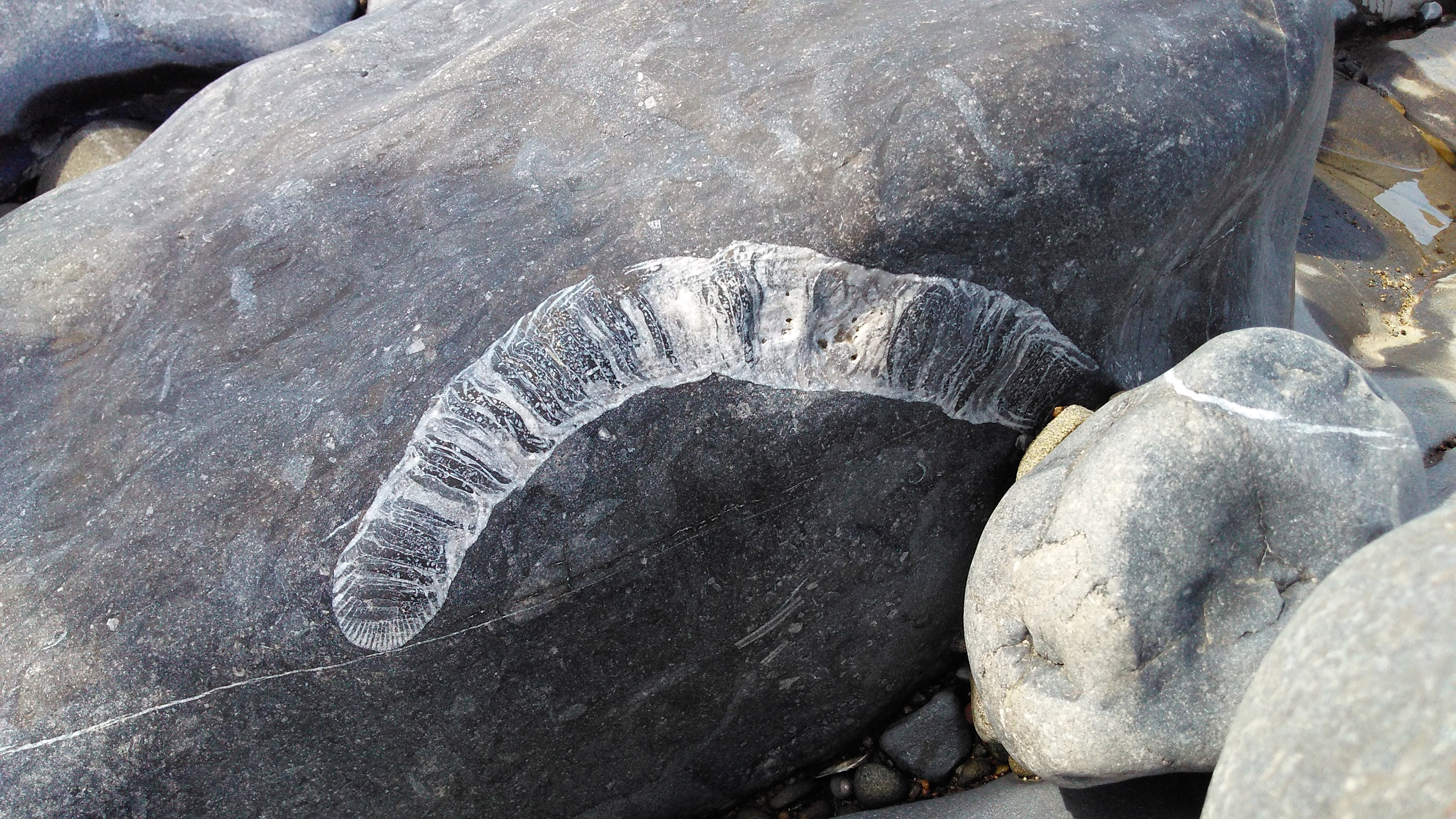
A mineralised rugose coral fossil on the foreshore just south of Ogmore

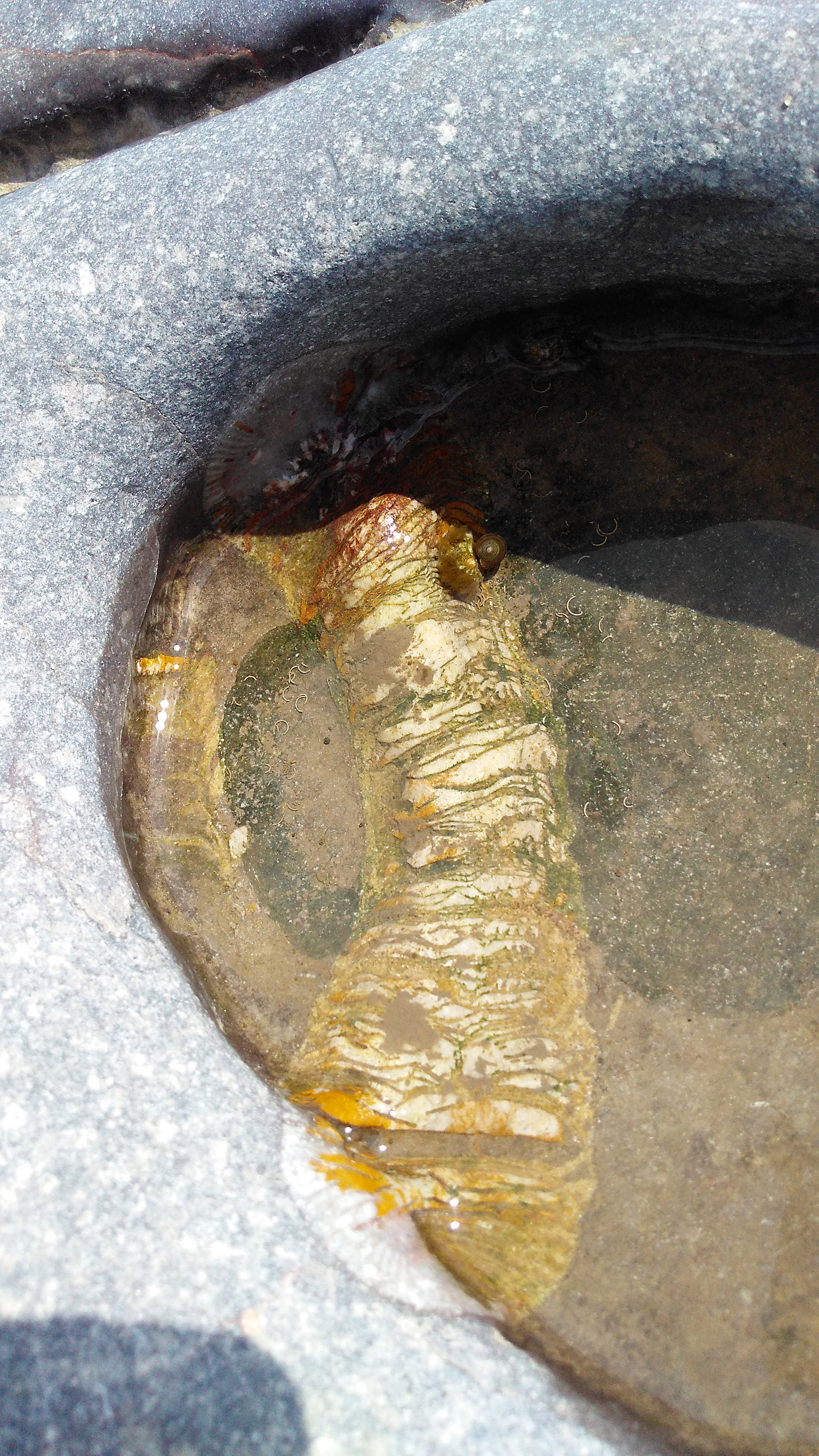
A rugose coral fossil embedded in a rock pool, showing mineralised internal structure, on the foreshore just south of Ogmore

=== Geology ===
Geological SSSIs are selected to protect sites that display one or more geological features. Three geological features are noted for this site as being of particular significance:–

- Alluvial fan deposits of Triassic sediments where they were deposited onto the eroded Carboniferous Limestone surface.
- Jurassic intrusion of mineralised fluids into the basal breccia, Carboniferous limestone and Triassic rocks. Veins of calcite, baryte and galena are found within the coastal cliffs and outcrops.
- The gradual change in deposition characteristics from water's edge (littoral) deposits through to the deeper water marine deposits can be seen south-east of Black Rocks. The cliffs and foreshore show this transition better than anywhere in Britain,

Places to look for these geological features include:-

- Triassic/Carboniferous unconformity and fan deposit: 51.463691°N 3.6409129°W, SS8610675135.
- Fossils in the limestone pavement: 51.458959°N 3.6352732°W, SS8648674600.
- The Carboniferous unconformity, karstic fill and mineralised veins: 51.458336°N 3.6341714°W, SS8656174529.
- Triassic conglomerates show well at51.457555°N 3.6333806°W, SS8661474441.
- A former quarry and lead mine: 51.456138°N 3.6290435°W, SS8691274277.
- Deep fissures in the Limestone pavement create blowholes. Overlying this are layers of Sutton Stone outcrops, and thinner banded limestone of the Southerndown beds: 51.454782°N 3.6265035°W, SS8708574122.

=== Botany ===
The cliff-top grassland is species-rich, with a range of plant communities. Where the limestone is at the surface, calcareous wildflowers are abundant, notably quaking grass, rock-rose and wild thyme. Other localities have neutral, deeper soil and cowslips, dog-violets and bird's foot trefoil are common. Nearer the sea, salt spray gives a maritime grassland community, including red fescue, sea carrot and buck's-horn plantain.

== See also ==
- List of Sites of Special Scientific Interest in Mid & South Glamorgan
- Old Castle Down (Neighbouring SSSI)
