= Portobello House =

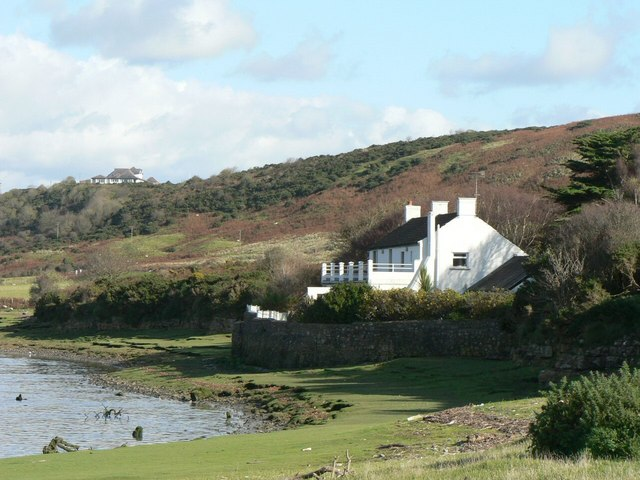
- Portobello House

- Location within Vale of Glamorgan
- Former names: Portobello Hotel

General information
- Type: Country house; former hotel
- Location: Near Ogmore-by-Sea, Vale of Glamorgan, Wales
- Coordinates: 51°28′26″N 3°37′29″W
- Owner: Dawn Clarenda Mary Llewellyn

Portobello House (also known formerly as Portobello Hotel) is a building on the bank of the River Ogmore, about half a mile up from the sea, near the estuary at Ogmore-by-Sea, western Vale of Glamorgan, southeast Wales, on the country border with Bridgend County Borough. It is accessed off the B4524 road. Merthyr Mawr Sand Dunes lie across the river from the house and Southerndown Golf Club lies to the southeast.

It was used to describe the location of several geological features in 1933.

It was formerly the Portobello Hotel and served also as a social club. During some period it was run by the Prosser family. A community history reports that "At one time, it was only possible to buy drinks on a Sunday throughout Wales if you could prove to the innkeeper that you had travelled three miles or more". The Portobello Hotel served well as a post-practice social gathering place for shooters at the Glamorgan Artillery, as it was conveniently "the required distance".

Also walkers in the countryside seeking to cross the River Ogmore would not be able to cross if the tide was in, and a Mr. Prosser from the Portobello could be relied upon to ferry across the river in "his little flat-bottomed home-made boat for a small fee."

The Portobello House has been owned for decades by Dawn Clarenda Mary Llewellyn, a former medical professional.
