= Monknash Coast =

Protected area in Glamorgan, Wales

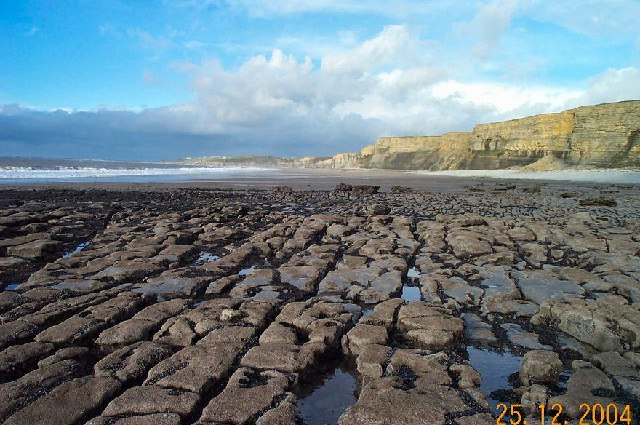

Monknash Coast is a coastal Site of Special Scientific Interest between Monknash and St Donats in the Vale of Glamorgan, southern Wales. It contains Nash Point and forms part of the Glamorgan Heritage Coast, bordered by Southerndown Coast to the northwest.

== See also ==
- List of Sites of Special Scientific Interest in Mid & South Glamorgan
