= Clemenstone =

Hamlet in the Vale of Glamorgan, Wales

Coordinates: 51.451667°N 3.549722°W

Clemenstone: Welsh: Treglement
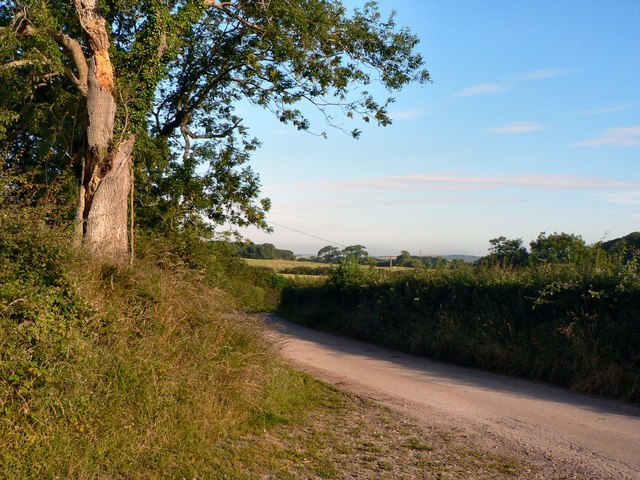
- Farm road between Llandow and Clemenstone

- Location within the Vale of Glamorgan
- Principal area: Vale of Glamorgan
- Preserved county: South Glamorgan
- Country: Wales
- Sovereign state: United Kingdom
- Postcode district: CF
- Police: South Wales
- Fire: South Wales
- Ambulance: Welsh
- UK Parliament: Vale of Glamorgan
- Senedd Cymru – Welsh Parliament: Vale of Glamorgan

Clemenstone or Clemenston (Welsh: Treglement) is a hamlet located in the western part of the Vale of Glamorgan, southeast Wales, southeast of Bridgend. Historically part of Glamorgan, it contains the Clemenstone Estate and House, long-time seat of the Curre family, and a Sports Academy. Clemenstone Meadows are a Site of Special Scientific Interest (SSSI).

== Geography ==
In the mid 19th century, Clemenstone consisted of the whole of the parish of St. Andrew Minor, which was exempt from parochial rates; as well as other adjoining lands in the parishes of Wick and Llandow that lay within a ring fence. These comprised approximately 372 acres of arable and pasture land. The estate was in the centre of hunting country and was well stocked with game. It was situated on the south edge of the Glamorganshire mineral basin and in close proximity to the South Wales Railway, which had the advantage of a ready market for agricultural produce, as well as for a supply of good and cheap coal.

In present day, it lies on the road to Llandow in the east, northeast of Wick, across the B4265 road. The hamlet is approached along the road from Wick in a small lane off to the right. The central part of the hamlet is S-shaped with bends in the road. Immediately after the hamlet after approaching from the west is a lane to the left going north which leads to Clemenstone House at the bottom of a hill. The lane continues and then rejoins the main road from Wick north of the first turn off to Clemenstone. Clemenstone Brook is nearby.

== History ==
Clemenstone was the seat of several high sheriffs of Glamorganshire including John Curre who was known to be occupying the estate in Clemenstone in 1712 and William Curre in 1766, who was also an occupant of Itton Court. From the 1830s, it was known to be occupied by a Humphrey Turberville, who inherited the estate from his brother. After the 1830 marriage of Richard Franklen to Isabella Catherine Talbot, Franklen bought the Clemenstone estate.

In July 1858, the mansion and estate was offered for sale by auction, described as being for a family of distinction. The grounds were laid out well, and the kitchen gardens were productive. The stabling and carriage houses were placed at a convenient distance from the residence. The farm buildings included a barn fitted with a steam engine, and machinery for thrashing, winnowing, and dressing. There were quarries, both of Has and mountain limestone, suitable for building and manure. At the time of sale by auction, there was also a beneficial lease in the adjoining Little Clemenstone Farm, consisting of 109 acres.

In the early 19th century, Lady Sale née Wynch, wife of Sir Robert Sale, was known to have spent much of her early life at the Clemenstone Estate. In 1981, the house at Clemenstone was said to be in a ruined state, three stories high and with walls dating to the 18th century although with traces of an older house which had existed on the spot. There are the remains of a church to the south of the hamlet.

== Meadows ==
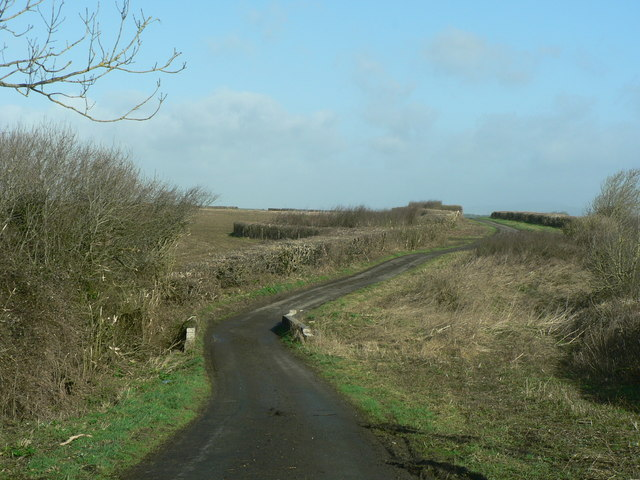
The Clemenstone Meadows

Clemenstone Meadows are a Site of Special Scientific Interest (SSSI). This site, which is designated as a conservation area denoting a protected area in the United Kingdom, is privately owned. The designated site covers an area of 4.9 hectares (12 acres) (notified in 1972, 1982 and 1990 under National Grid reference SS 920739)., and straddles the Clemenstone Brook, which is the boundary between the communities of Wick and St Brides Major. It consists of two habitats namely, the marshy grass land and the dry neutral grassland. Plant species found at this site are reported to be fen Meadow thistle, purple moor-grass, devil's-bit scabious, pepper saxifrage, saw-wort, meadowsweet, and marsh valerian in the marshy grassland, while the dry areas of the site have common knapweed, crested dog's tail, betony, cowslips, and quaking grass.

The site is a mile away from Wick. Clemenstone Brook, a tributary of the Afon Alun, flows through the meadows and forms a shallow valley. The geological formation consists of alluvium overlying limestone formations of the coastal plateau, with distinct soil characteristics.

In these meadows, the marshy grassland's special feature is that it is rich in plant life with 30 species reported for every square metre. Its faunal species consist of insects, birds such as lapwings which breed here, and mammals.

Wick, Vale of Glamorgan SSSI has urged the private owners of these meadows to continue to conserve this area with special emphasis on permitting grazing to maintain a sward of 5–20 centimetres (2.0–7.9 in) height to control the land from becoming scrub and woodland, manage hay as practiced in the past, creating “dew ponds” at suitable locations as watering holes for cattle stock during winter and maintaining soil moisture by controlled cleaning of ditches and drains.

== See also ==
- List of Sites of Special Scientific Interest in Mid & South Glamorgan
