= Southerndown =

Village in Vale of Glamorgan, Wales

Coordinates: 51°27′15″N 3°36′45″W

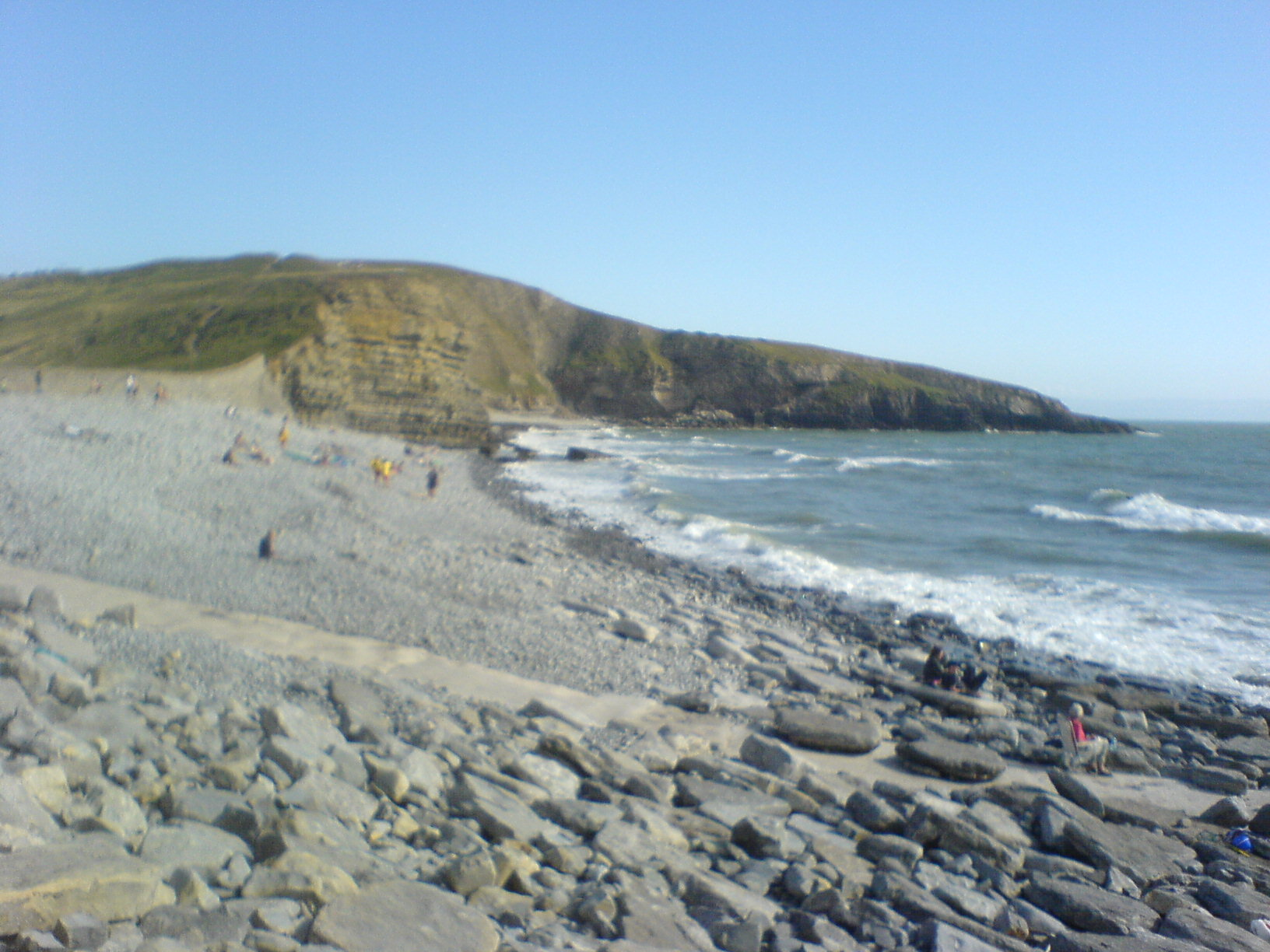
Southerndown beach on the Bristol Channel coast

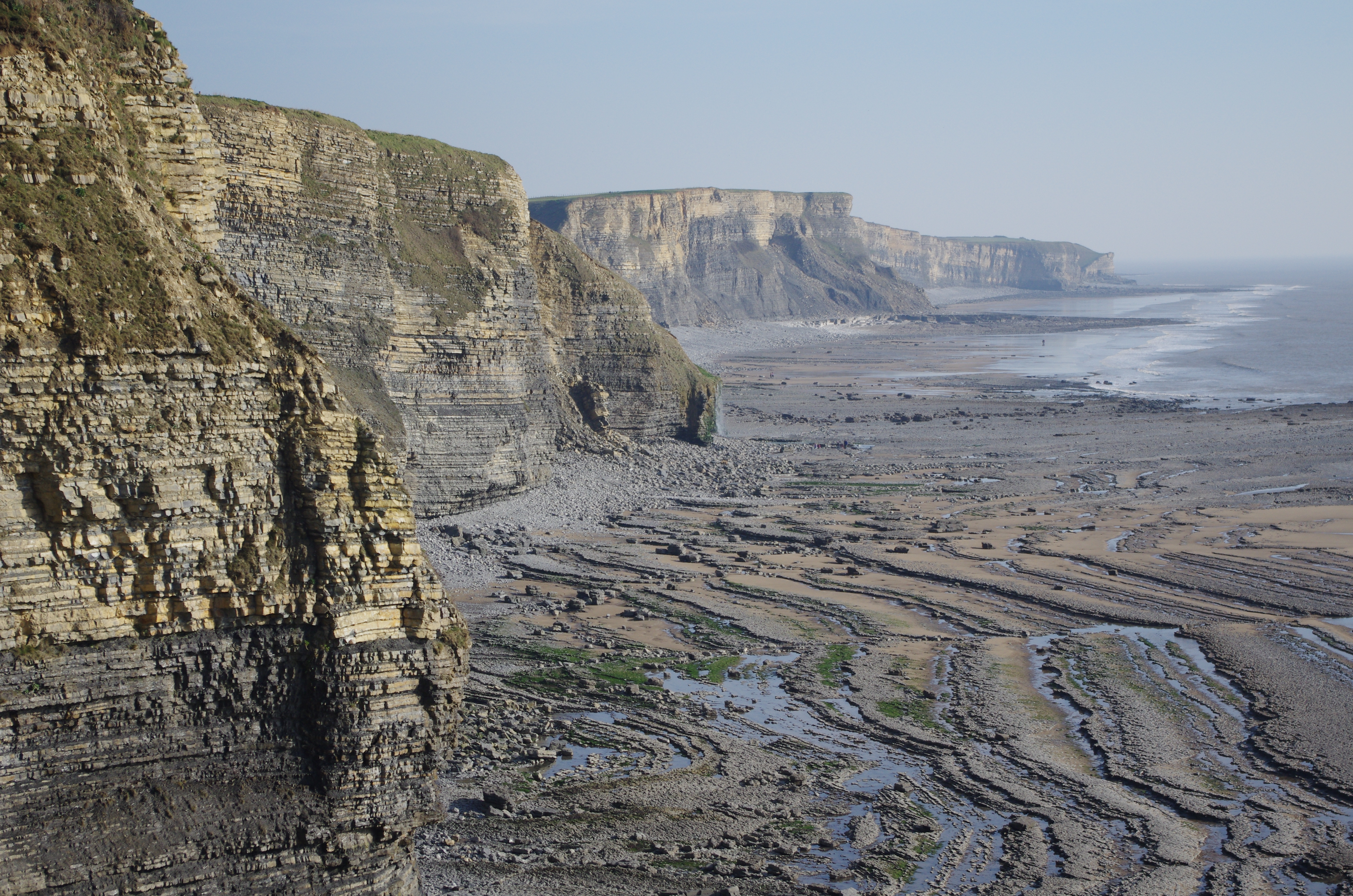
Cliffs on the Glamorgan Heritage Coast south of Dunraven Park.

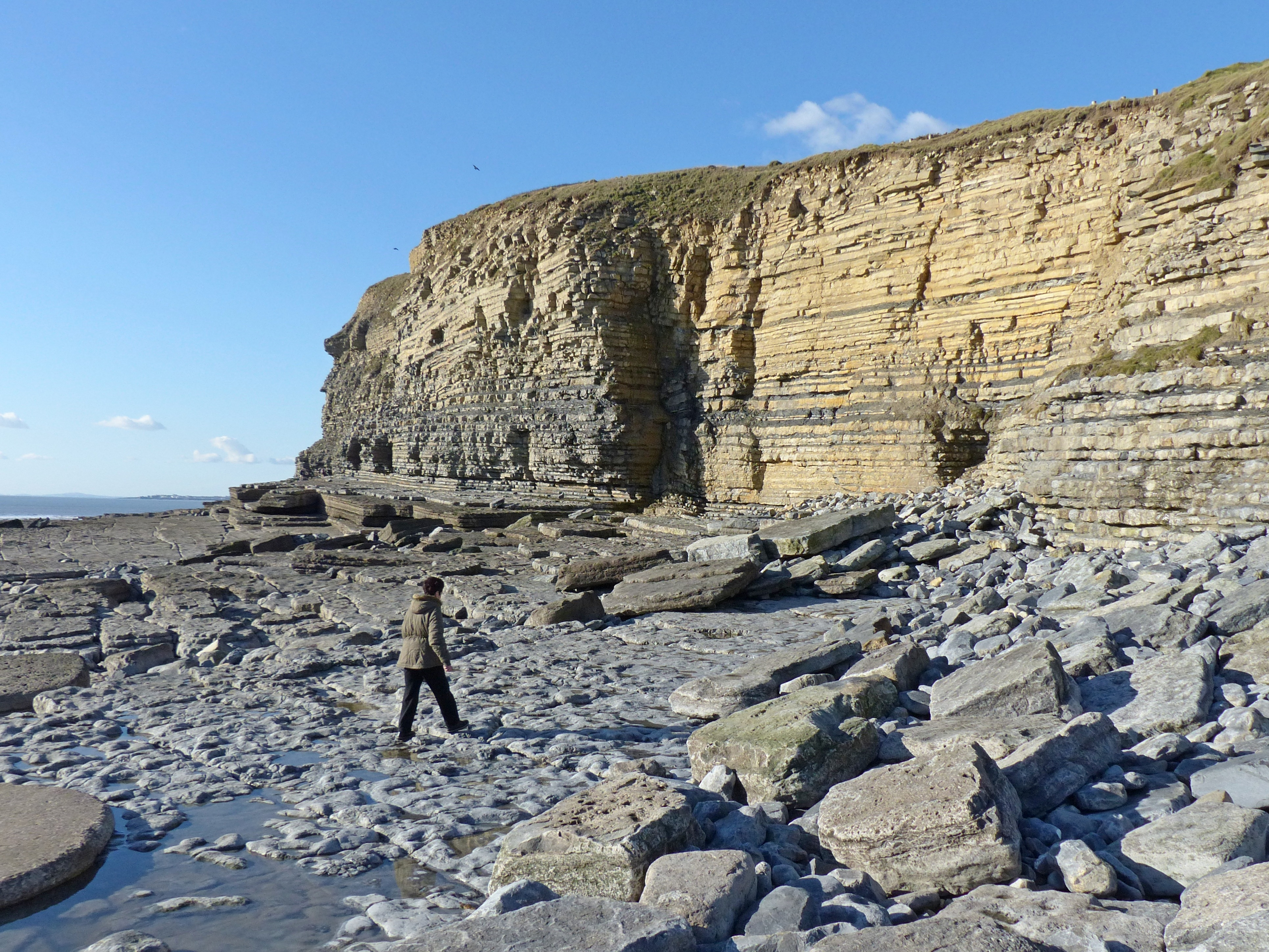
The strata of Southerndown beach

Southerndown is a village in the Vale of Glamorgan, in south Wales. It is southwest of Bridgend, and within the St Brides Major community, close to Llantwit Major and Ogmore-by-Sea. It is mostly known for its beach which backs Dunraven Bay (Welsh: Bae Dwnrhefn), which is a popular tourist destination during the summer months and since 1972 has been part of a Heritage Coast and is part of the Southerndown Coast SSSI. When the tide is out there is an expanse of sand and pools. The cliffs are an obvious example of sedimentary rock.

== Beach ==
As Southerndown, along with nearby Ogmore-by-Sea, is a west-facing beach (and hence on the Atlantic coast), off-shore winds usually generate much good-quality surf, helped by the warming effects of the Gulf Stream.

A larger rocky shore platform and beach to the southeast is separated by a headland on which are the remains of Dunraven Castle (Welsh: Castell Dwnrhefn). This beach is lesser used for inconvenience and severing of its land link — it has access by steep steps that reach the beach/sea away from the cliffs which has led to people having to wait for the tide to change at high tide. It stretches to Nash Point near Llantwit Major.

It has been used in the occasional TV production, including on Doctor Who: as Bad Wolf Bay in "Doomsday" and "Journey's End", as the surface of the alien planet in "The Time of Angels" and "Flesh and Stone", and as the engine room of the ark ship in "Dinosaurs on a Spaceship". It also appeared in Merlin in the first-season episode 'The Labyrinth of Gedref' and in Sherlock during the fourth-season episode 'The Final Problem'. It was also featured in the Bob Dylan film Hearts of Fire, with Dylan looking out over the second beach down onto Rupert Everett.

During the summer, Southerndown Lifesaving Club use the beach as opposed to St Donat's Castle.

Adjoining is Southerndown Golf Club.

The Southerndown Cliffs are a suicide spot.

== Geology of Southerndown and Dunraven Bay ==
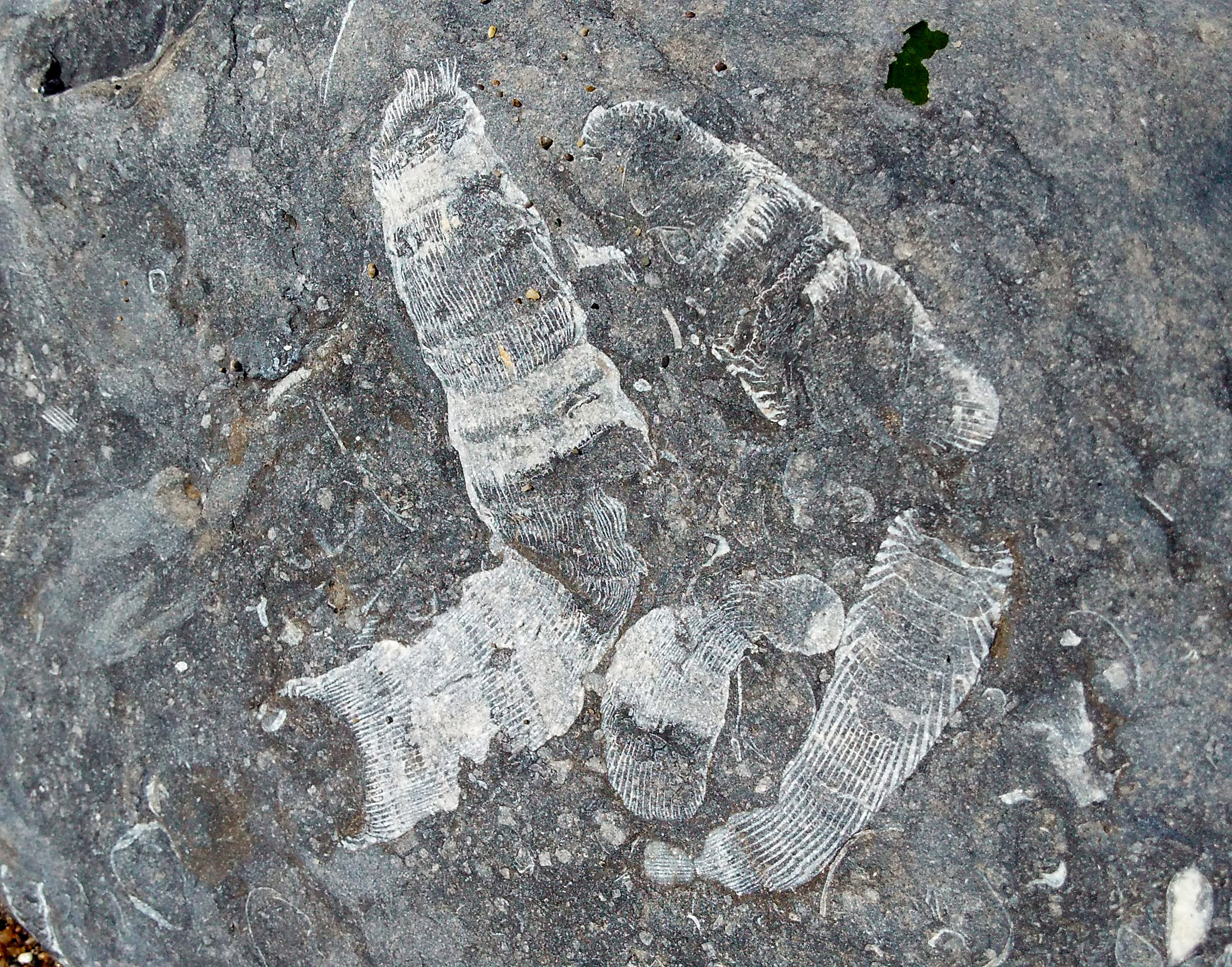
Rugose coral fossils found in rocks on the Southerndown Coast

All the rocks exposed in the area of Southerndown are sedimentary rocks. They were laid down as deposits of mud, silt, sand and lime (calcium-rich deposits from shells and bones) that, over long periods of time, were compacted and solidified into limestone, shale (compacted mud) and conglomerate (rock of pebbles of various size).

The oldest rocks are hard, grey, often shelly, Carboniferous Limestone. These were laid down in a warm, shallow sea during the early part of the Carboniferous Period when the future Wales lay on or near the equator. Continental drift and earthquakes folded and fractured the Earth's crust, and during the next 100 million years the rocks suffered extensive erosion. The movements left the upfolded Carboniferous Limestone as high ground, the slopes and cliffs of the Vale of Glamorgan.

During the early Jurassic Period, a shallow sea spread northwards over the land. As the water deepened the higher areas became islands before finally being inundated. Water depth influenced the kinds of sediments that were deposited. Rocks formed close to the shore (Sutton Stone and Southerndown Beds) are strikingly different from the Blue Lias, which was deposited at the same time but farther offshore. Sutton Stone consists of massive, white, conglomeratic limestones with pebbles of black chert (silica) and Carboniferous Limestone. The overlying Southerndown Beds are blue/grey conglomeratic limestones and limy sandstones with thin shale partings. The Sutton Stone and Southerndown Beds pass laterally into, and are overlain by, the alternating blue-grey limestones and shales of the Blue Lias. The Jurassic rocks are generally rich in fossils. Shells of bivalves, and ammonites, fragments of crinoids, corals and pieces of carbonised fossil wood are quite common.

During the last 200 million years further earth movements have seen some folding and fracturing of the rocks and, during the relative stasis but higher waters since the end of the last Ice Age, the coastline has in most places resumed a fast pace of erosion, retreating in places by several miles by subaerial and marine erosion.
