= Tusker Rock =

Rock in the Bristol Channel, UK

Coordinates: 51.45398°N 3.66944°W

Tusker Rock (Welsh: Ynys Twsgr) is a rock in the Bristol Channel, about 2 miles (3.2 km) west of Ogmore-by-Sea, Vale of Glamorgan, Wales. It is suggested that it takes its name from Tuska the Viking, a Dane whose fellow Vikings semi-colonised the Vale of Glamorgan. Alternatively, the name might derive (as with the similarly named Tuskar Rock, Ireland and various other Tusker Rocks in the Bristol Channel and Milford Haven/Skomer area) simply from the Old Norse tu (large) skar (rock).

It is fully visible only at low tide, and was formerly a notorious hazard for ships.

Today, the waters around Tusker Rock are a popular diving location.
