= Glamorgan Heritage Coast =

Stretch of coastline in South Wales

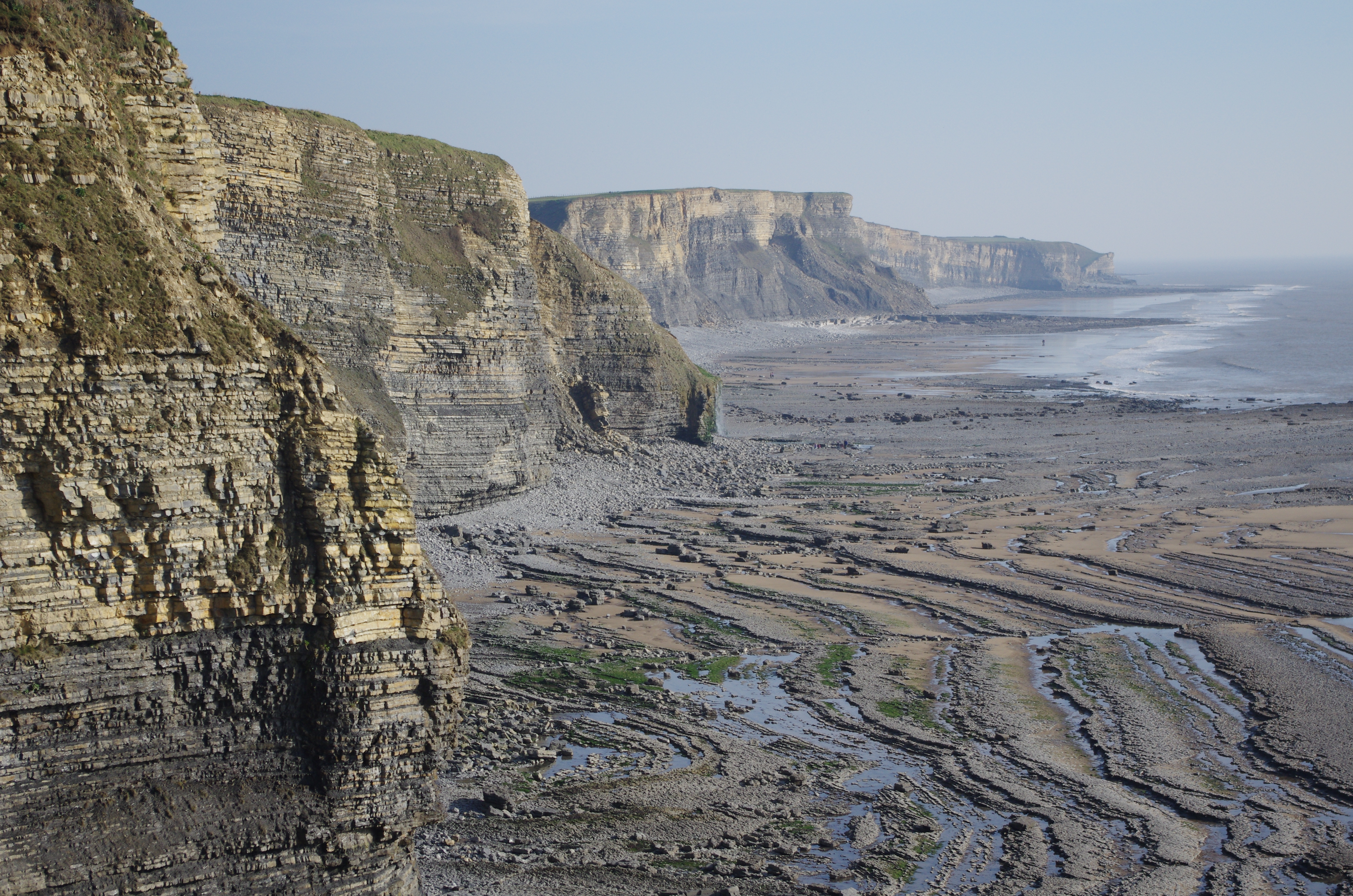
Cliffs and beach near Southerndown

The Glamorgan Heritage Coast is a 14-mile (23 km) stretch of coastline in the Vale of Glamorgan, South Wales, UK.

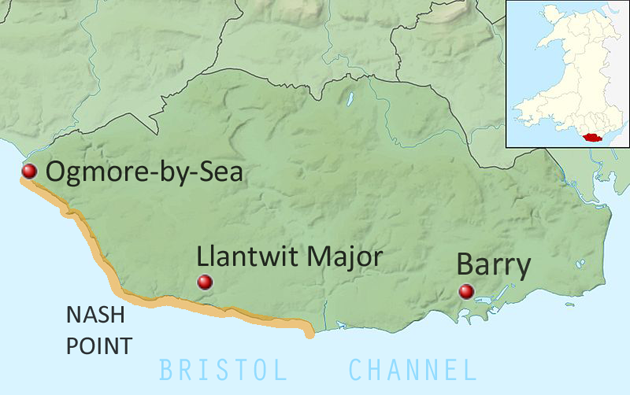
Glamorgan Heritage Coast location

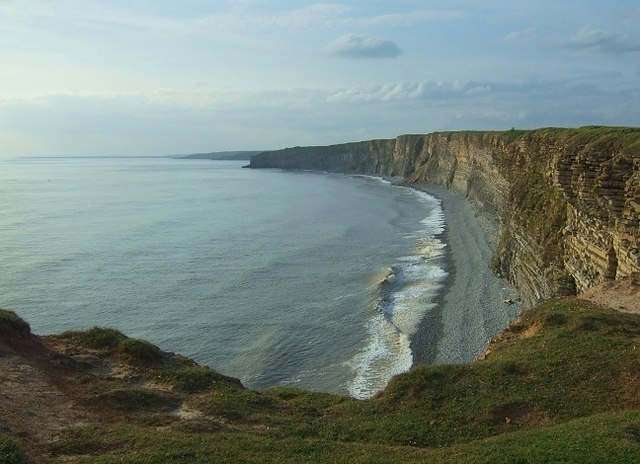
View from Nash Point cliff

The Glamorgan Heritage Coast lies between Ogmore-by-Sea and St Athan (with Nash Point at its midpoint) on the South Wales coast. There is a Heritage Coast Centre located at Dunraven Park, Southerndown, at the western end of the coast, providing an information point and education centre.

The coast includes the Southerndown Coast Site of Special Scientific Interest at its heart, a 3.1-mile (5.0 km) section from Ogmore-by-Sea, particularly interesting for its exposed Triassic alluvial fan deposits of carboniferous limestone. There is an Iron Age promontory fort (as well as a 19th-century lighthouse) at Nash Point and an ancient cairn or cromlech at Cwm Marcross.

The stretch of coast made the news in 2014 when coastal erosion left a towering stack of limestone "about five times the height of a house" separated from the main cliffs near Dunraven Bay.

In 2016 four large sculptures were to be created by artist Howard Bowcott, to be placed at strategic points along the coastline.

== See also ==
- Heritage coast
