= Ewenny River =

Coordinates: 51.48197°N 3.60737°W

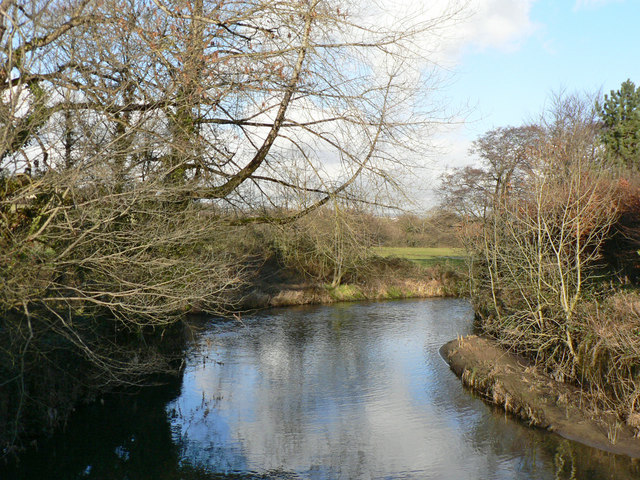
- The river at Ewenny, the village to which it gave its name.
- Native name: Afon Ewenni (Welsh)

Location
- Country: Wales (United Kingdom)
- Region: South Wales
- County: Vale of Glamorgan
- Cities: Pencoed, Ewenny, Ogmore

Physical characteristics
- Source
  - location: North of Pencoed, Bridgend County Borough, Bridgend, Wales
- Length: 11.0 km (6.8 mi)
- Discharge
  - location: Ogmore Castle, Vale of Glamorgan

Basin features
- Tributaries
  - left: Afon Alun, Afon Ewenni Fach, Nant Canna, Nant Crymlyn

The Ewenny River (Welsh: Afon Ewenni) is a river in South Wales. It is 10 miles (16 km) long, and forms the border between the Vale of Glamorgan and Bridgend. It is a major tributary of the River Ogmore, which it joins near its estuary.

== Course ==
The river rises to the north east of Bridgend town, in South Wales, where two minor rivers known as Ewenny Fach and Ewenny Fawr join. Ewenny Fach is considered a tributary of the Ewenny Fawr, which in turn is formed when three streams, Nant Canna, Nant Ciwc and Nant Crymlyn join. This branch of the river flows southeast, past the village of Pencoed and under the M4 Motorway until it is joined by the Ewenny Fach south of Junction 35 of the road. From here, the river turns southward and flows through the Ewenni Moor, past the village of Waterton. Waterton is the site of a large industrial estate, and a few miles of meandering river were straightened and diverted to prevent flooding. The river flows through the villages of Ewenny and Ogmore, before entering the River Ogmore estuary just below where Ogmore Castle is on the river. One of its main tributaries is the Afon Alun, which flows west for a few miles, and converges with the Ewenny north of Ogmore.

== Fishing ==
The river has presence of grayling, and also sewin.

== Mouth ==
The River Ewenny meets the River Ogmore near Ogmore Castle, located to the south of the confluence. At this point, a series of stepping stones provide a crossing over the Ewenny, though they do not extend across the Ogmore itself.

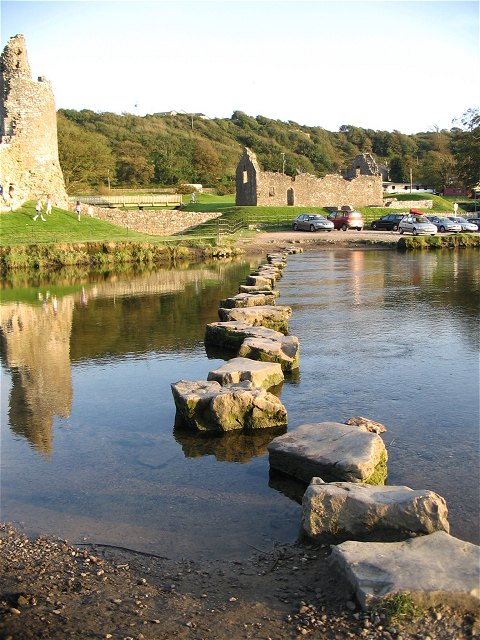
Stepping stones across the River Ewenny at Ogmore by Sea
