= Ogmore centre =

Ogmore Centre at Ogmore-by-Sea, Wales, often referred to as the Ogmore School Camp, was situated on an 18.7-acre (76,000 m^{2}) site on the Glamorgan Heritage Coast. It was built for the benefit of children from all over South Wales shortly before World War II as a residential education, sport, arts and outdoor activities centre for young people 8–24 years of age. The camp was closed in 2007 and demolished to make way for housing in 2014.

== History ==
Ogmore Centre came under the ownership of Bridgend City Council at the time of local authority reorganisation. It had previously been operated under the old Mid Glamorgan Education Authority. Although still under the ownership of Bridgend County Borough Council it was located in The Vale of Glamorgan with regard to planning etc. After it was closed by Bridgend County Borough Council in the mid-1990s public pressure led to it being reopened in 1998 as a Trust under the leadership of Roger Lewis, now Chief Executive of the Welsh Rugby Union.

In the subsequent years up to 2006 some 10000 children a year attended residential courses in subjects including literacy, languages, mathematics, music, performing arts, sports and environmental studies. It provided a sense of adventure by being the first time away from home for many, in a safe secure facility.

The camp had a sprung floor gymnasium with indoor facilities for basketball, football, badminton, indoor cricket nets etc. It had outdoor playing fields for both rugby and soccer, and an outdoor climbing frame. In addition it had a computer lab and a hall for performing arts, together with classrooms and rehearsal facilities. All of this, together with the beaches and heritage coast.

In 2004 planning approval was given to build a new ECO Centre on site, which would have been a living, learning environment for sustainability studies and would have made the site a Centre of Environmental Excellence.

The Trust kept the cost of attendance low to enable children from poorer areas to afford to attend. As running costs escalated this began to tip the economic balance of running the centre against it being able to continue. In order to move forward, the Trust sought the help of Kingswood Education and Adventure Centres, an organisation who operate a number of similar facilities in the UK. They had the resources to improve the marketing and provide funding for upgrading the facilities.

== Today ==
In 2007 Kingswood offered to pay an economic rent and provide the funding to upgrade the facility or purchase the centre outright so it could continue as a residential education facility with preferential rates for local children, but BCBC declined to explore either of these possibilities further and declared the Trust to be in breach of their lease agreement. Bridgend refused any variation of the lease agreement thereby forcing Kingswood to vacate the centre and further declines of local or central funding put a huge strain on the trust that had originally saved the centre. The doors were closed its doors in December 2007 with the loss of local jobs.

The Glamorgan Gazette reported that Bridgend had secretly identified the site as potentially generating £7m revenues during a difficult budgetary period. A planning application by BCBC to demolish the centre and build some 84 houses was submitted in 2009. Wig Fach Property Company are competing for planning permission to also develop the site together with the adjacent caravan park to build some 130 houses. Wig Fach have said they would keep the education facility and are prepared to look again at the Kingswood proposal. However their plan provides for the demolition and change of use of more than 50% of the residential capacity so vital to the ongoing viability of the site for residential education.

In August 2009 Kingswood Centres restated their commitment to re-open the centre with a £2-£3 million investment at a local resident community meeting. Attempts were still under way from local groups, the trustees of Ogmore Centre and Kingswood, to allow the centre to reopen in 2010.

This never occurred and the centre was subsequently sold for the construction of new housing. The development was begun toward the end of 2014 and completed in 2018 with the construction of over 70 new homes. The builders were David Wilson Ltd who are part of the Barrett Group.

Many people who attended the Ogmore Centre have gone in to be famous in their own right including sports men and women and musicians.
