= Nash Point =

Nash Point Lighthouse
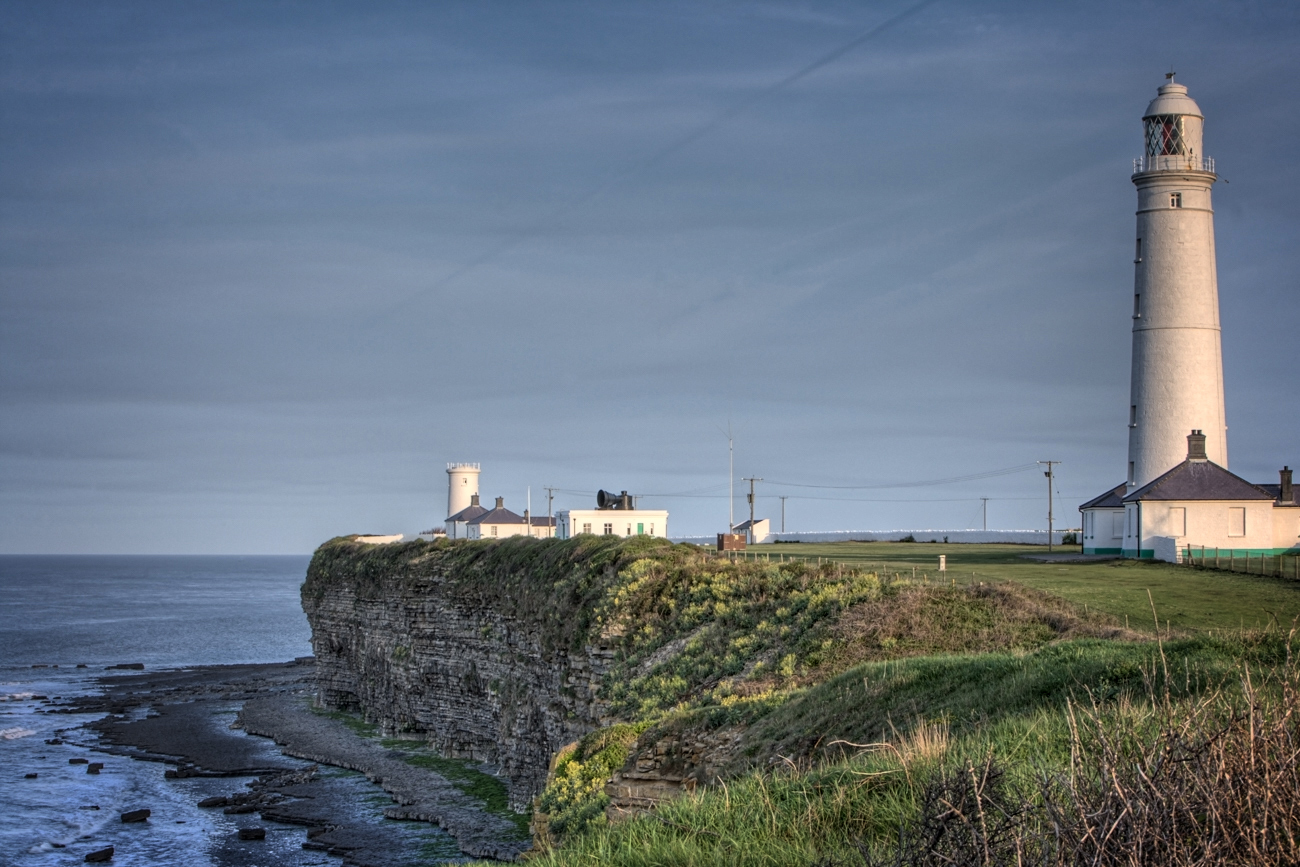
- Low Tower, Keepers cottages, Fog Horn house and Lighthouse at Nash Point
- Location: St Donats; Vale of Glamorgan; Wales; United Kingdom
- Coordinates: 51.400863°N 3.552259°W

Tower
- Constructed: 1832
- Built by: James Walker
- Construction: stone tower
- Automated: 1998
- Height: 37 metres (121 ft)
- Shape: tapered cylindrical tower with balcony and lantern
- Markings: white tower and lantern
- Operator: Trinity House
- Heritage: Grade II listed building

Light
- Focal height: 56 metres (184 ft)
- Lens: 360mm catadioptric
- Intensity: 134,000 candela
- Range: 21 nautical miles (39 km; 24 mi)
- Characteristic: Fl (2) WR 15s.

Cliffs at Nash Point

Nash Point (Welsh: Trwyn yr As) is a headland and beach in the Monknash Coast of the Vale of Glamorgan in south Wales, about a mile from Marcross. It is a popular location for ramblers and hiking along the cliffs to Llantwit Major beach. The lighthouse meadow is a Site of Special Scientific Interest, containing rare plants such as the tuberous thistle, and other wildlife such as choughs can be seen.

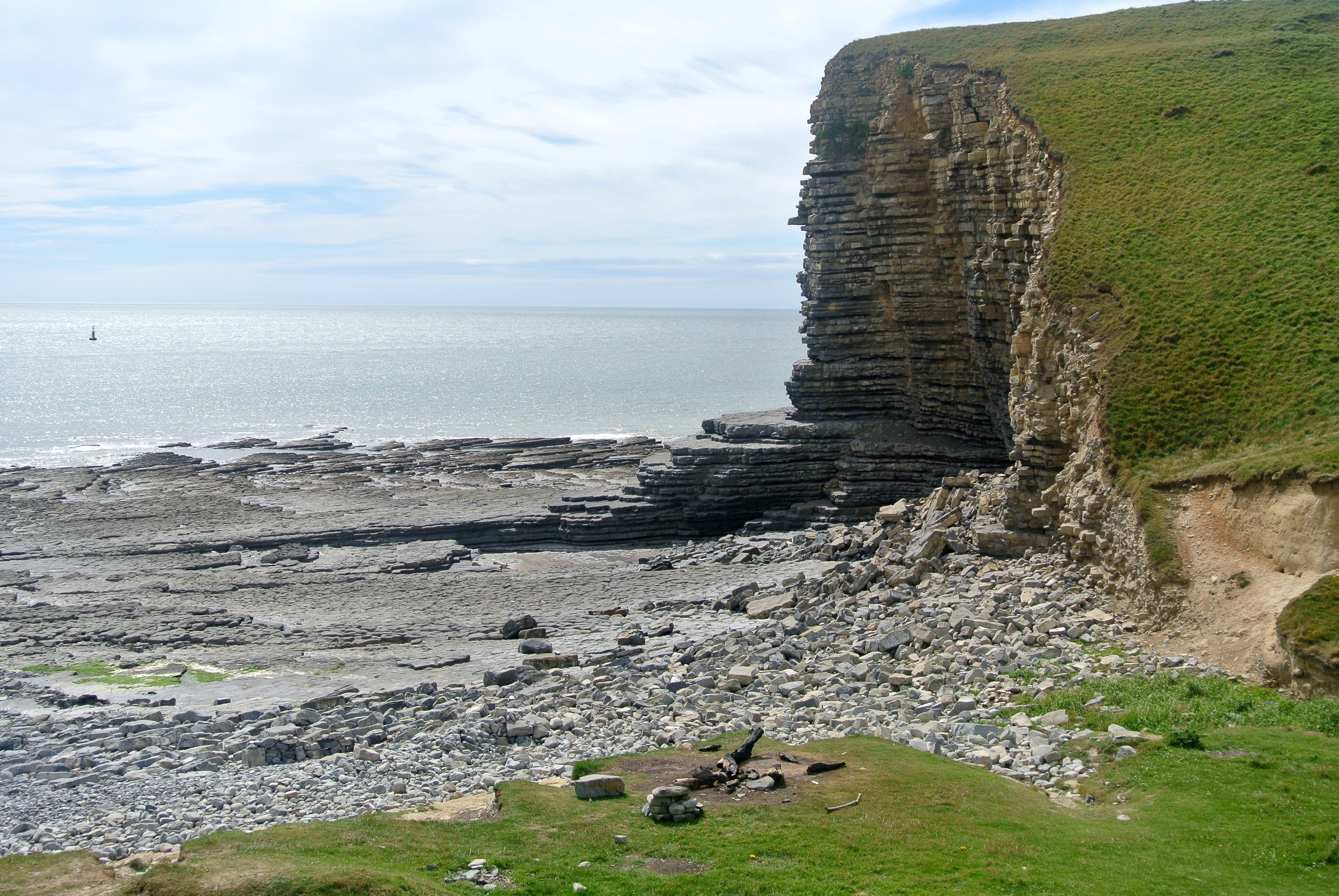
Nash Point

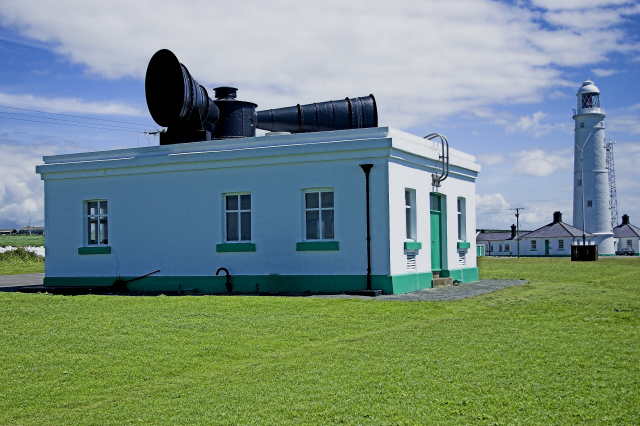
Nash Point Lighthouse with Fog Horn House in foreground

Parts of the section of the Glamorgan Heritage Coast where the lighthouse stands consists of "cliffs of Lias limestone interbedded with softer erodible material" and has been identified as potentially at risk from erosion and flooding. Many fossils, including ammonites and gryphaea are to be found there. Marcross Brook passes through the cliffs and an Iron Age hillfort, usually called Nash Point Camp, stands on the north side of the brook, although its remains have been largely eroded by the sea. Round barrows are also to be found nearby. A study of the rocks shows that they exemplify "a 12,000 year old sequence of tufa, scree and slope deposits containing abundant fossil snails", while the Nash Bank offshore is formed by "Jurassic mudstones overlain by bands of sand and gravel".

== Nash Point Lighthouse ==
The Nash Point Lighthouse is a Grade II listed building, dating from 1831 to 1832. There are two lights, a high light and a low light, located at a distance of around 300 metres (1,000 ft) from one another. The leading light was removed during the 1920s because of the shifting location of the Nash sandbank. The lighthouse was designed by James Walker, the chief engineer for Trinity House. Its construction is said to have been spurred by the wreck of The Frolic on the Nash Sands in March 1831, which resulted in over 50 deaths, including that of Lt-Col N McLeod. The ship was on its way from Bristol to Haverfordwest. First lit in 1832, the lighthouse was electrified in 1968. Nash Point Lighthouse became the last staffed lighthouse in Wales, and was automated in 1998.

== Shipwreck ==
In 1962, the empty tanker BP Driver (formerly the BP Explorer, which had been rebuilt following a disaster in the River Severn) was pushed on the rocks and was abandoned by its crew of five, all of whom survived. Despite the assistance given by the lighthouse, the ship's captain was unable to bring her in safely to land. At low tide, remains of the wreck can be found about 200 m (650 ft) north of the beach access by the light house.

== See also ==
- List of lighthouses in Wales
