= Ogmore-by-Sea =

Village in the Vale of Glamorgan, Wales

Coordinates: 51.464°N 3.635°W

Ogmore-by-Sea: Welsh: Aberogwr
- Location within the Vale of Glamorgan
- Population: 878
- Community: St Brides Major
- Principal area: Vale of Glamorgan
- Preserved county: South Glamorgan
- Country: Wales
- Sovereign state: United Kingdom
- Post town: BRIDGEND
- Postcode district: CF32
- Dialling code: 01656
- Police: South Wales
- Fire: South Wales
- Ambulance: Welsh
- UK Parliament: Vale of Glamorgan
- Senedd Cymru – Welsh Parliament: Vale of Glamorgan

Ogmore-by-Sea (Welsh: Aberogwr, meaning "Mouth of the River Ogmore") is a seaside village in St Brides Major community in the Vale of Glamorgan, Wales. It lies on the western limit of the Glamorgan Heritage Coast of south Wales. The population in 2011 was 878.

== History ==
A polished flint axe-head of Seamer type was found at Ogmore Mill in 1976.

Just as with its counterparts in Cornwall, Ireland and Brittany, the west-facing beach and coast was notorious as a graveyard for ships during strong on-shore winds (south-westerly winds from the Atlantic). In particular, many ships were destroyed on Tusker Rock, a brutal reef slightly out to sea, that is totally covered at high tide. There are urban legends of organised shipwrecking at Ogmore, as well as across the Vale of Glamorgan coastline, similar to tales from Cornwall of the use of false lights so that passing ships would mistake them as a lighthouse or ship at anchor and be lured to destruction, although there is no historical evidence for that.

In 1954, a church was begun in one of the houses in the village. It grew too big for the house and, in 1968, a building was erected to provide a place in which the group could meet. The church still exists and the congregation celebrated its 50th anniversary in 2018.

In December 2025, hundreds of hobnailed shoes from the Victorian era washed ashore on Ogmore-by-Sea beach. The Beach Academy social enterprise found the shoes. It was unclear where they came from, though they were possibly from a 19th century shipwreck.

== Geography ==
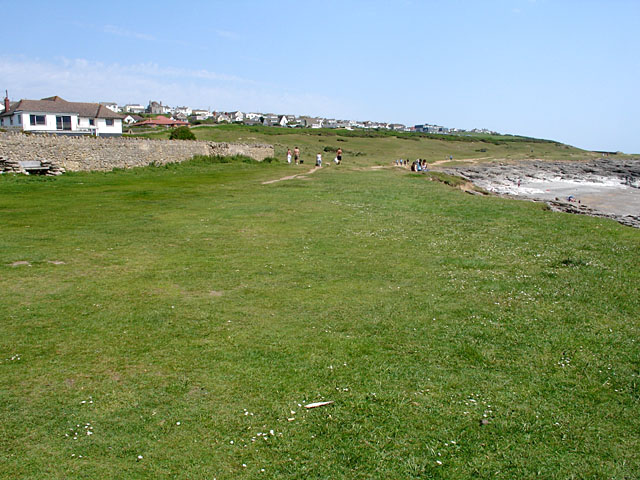
View from near the beach

Ogmore-by-Sea is about three miles (five kilometres) south of Bridgend and about twenty miles (thirty kilometres) west of Cardiff. The beaches look out on Tusker Rock, and have sand at low-tide and sharp rocks at high-tide.

The River Ogmore estuary is flanked by Ogmore beach on one side and the dunes of Merthyr Mawr on the other. The estuary makes bathing unsafe from most of the beach. The rocky shoreline is well known as a rock climbing location. It is an interesting place geologically with a variety of fossils clearly visible. Many people use the car park by the estuary to the River Ogmore after entering the village, others move on to Southerndown. Ogmore has many beaches; along the path from the car park are Hardee's Bay and Horseshoe Bay. Further on below Brig Y Don hill there are deeps with caves and secluded coves, many only accessible at times permitted by the tide.

== Geology ==
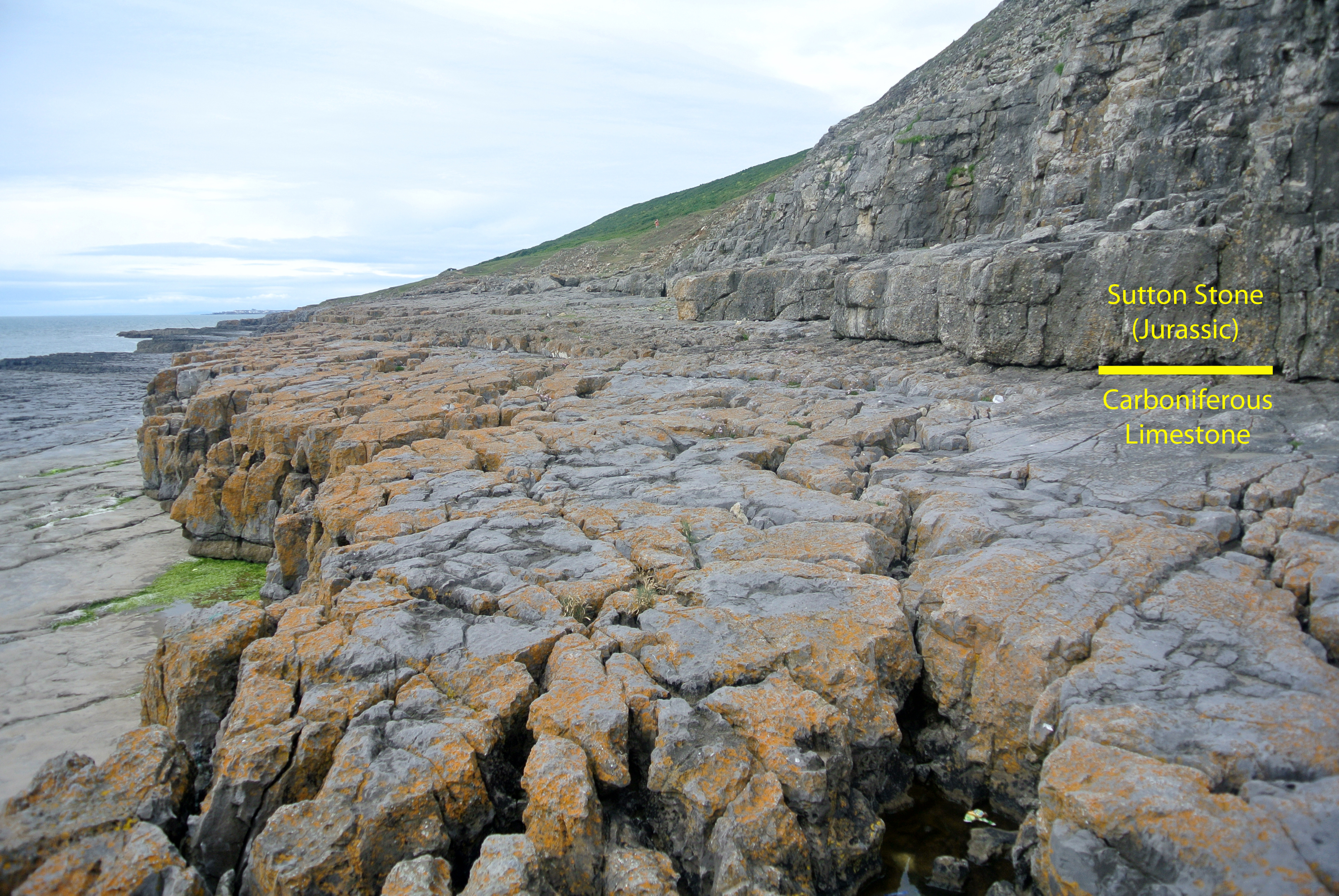
Carboniferous Limestone exposed near Ogmore-by-Sea showing the Carboniferous/Jurassic unconformity

The rocks exposed along the stretch of coast near Ogmore-by-Sea were laid down between 340 and 195 million years ago. They are all sedimentary rocks, originally deposited as lime, mud, sand and coarse pebbles, and over long periods of time these were compacted and solidified into limestone, shale and conglomerate.

The oldest rocks are hard, grey limestones that make up the Carboniferous Limestone. These were laid down in a warm, shallow, subtropical sea and are rich in fossils, especially corals, crinoids and brachiopods. About 300 million years ago movements in the Earth's crust deformed and folded the rocks, as a result of which the rocks above the Carboniferous Limestone were worn away. Deposition resumed during the Triassic Period when the area was a desert with hills of limestone, and a dry plain where the Bristol Channel is now. Short violent storms caused flash-floods which carried debris down the hillsides and deposited it as alluvial fans of coarse, red conglomerate at the edge of the plain. These Triassic lie unconformably on the Carboniferous Limestone.

About 205 million years ago, at the beginning of the Jurassic Period, the sea began to drown the land and the limestone hills became islands before finally being submerged. Sutton Stone, which contains pebbles of carboniferous limestone, represents rocks deposited close to the shore of these islands. In deeper water the Southerndown Beds were deposited. Finally, when deep water covered the area the alternating limestones and shales of the Blue Lias were deposited.

After the early Jurassic no evidence of geological events is preserved until the end of the last ice age, about 10,000 years ago. Fluctuating sea levels caused by the growth and melting of the ice sheets affected the shape of the landscape, and the coastline was moulded into its present shape by both subaerial and marine erosion, both of which continue today.

== Notable landmarks ==
Ogmore centre was built in the 1930s for the benefit of children from all over South Wales. It was closed in the mid-1990s, but was reopened as a Trust in 1998 and continued as such until 2007. Southerndown Golf Club and Portobello House are nearby.

== Culture and arts ==
- "Ogmore-by-the-Sea" is mentioned in the song "Don't get along with me Babe" by Cardiff band Doofer.
- Cardiff-born poet Dannie Abse (1923–2014) has a number of poems about or referencing "Ogmore-by-Sea" and other parts of the surrounding South Wales countryside.
- Ogmore-By-The-Sea is the hometown of Lucy Wilson and her Friend, Hobo, in 'The Lucy Wilson Mysteries'. These are a series of books published by Candy Jar Books as a tie in to BBC's 'Doctor Who'.
