= Old Castle Down =

Protected area in Glamorgan, Wales

Old Castle Down is a Site of Special Scientific Interest between St Brides Major and Ewenny in the Vale of Glamorgan, south Wales.

The Countryside Council for Wales states that the site has been categorised as a Site of Special Interest "...for a range of vegetation types and rare species. It supports calcareous grassland, acid grassland and heathland on limestone. Soft-leaved sedge and pale heath-violet are themselves features of interest and a number of other plants occur here which are rare in Wales. These include bristle-bent, a grass which is found in South-West England but in only a few places in South Wales. The site and the surrounding area provides habitat for the high brown fritillary, a butterfly which is rare and declining nationally. Old Castle Down SSSI also includes a geological feature of importance. The disused Duchy Quarry exposes Carboniferous rocks (about 340 million years old). Cracks and fissures within these rocks were infilled by sediments in Jurassic times (about 195 million years ago). These sediments incorporate the fossil remains of reptiles and primitive mammals."

== See also ==
- List of Sites of Special Scientific Interest in Mid & South Glamorgan
