= Afon Alun =

River in the Vale of Glamorgan, Wales

Coordinates: 51.48015°N 3.59124°W

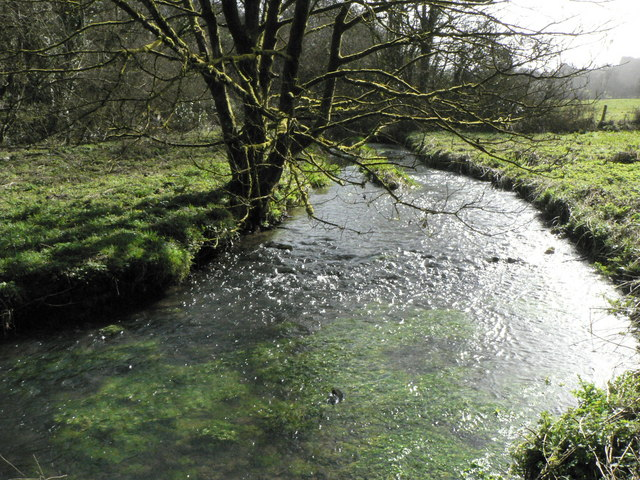
- The river near Castle-upon-Alun

Location
- Country: United Kingdom, Wales
- Region: South Wales
- County: Vale of Glamorgan

Physical characteristics
- Source
  - location: Llandow, Vale of Glamorgan, Wales
- Mouth: Ewenny River
- Length: 7.2 km (4.5 mi)
- Discharge
  - location: Ewenny River

Afon Alun is a river in the Vale of Glamorgan, south Wales. It is a tributary of the Ewenny River, which it joins to the south of Bridgend.

== Course ==
Two streams join near Llandow village to form the river: the Stembridge Brook and the Llandow Brook. After the confluence it flows in a broadly north-westerly direction following the route of the Vale of Glamorgan railway until it joins the Ewenny River just upstream of Ogmore Castle.

The river has one tributary, the Colwinston Brook, which, joins the river near the village of Colwinston.
