= Southerndown Golf Club =

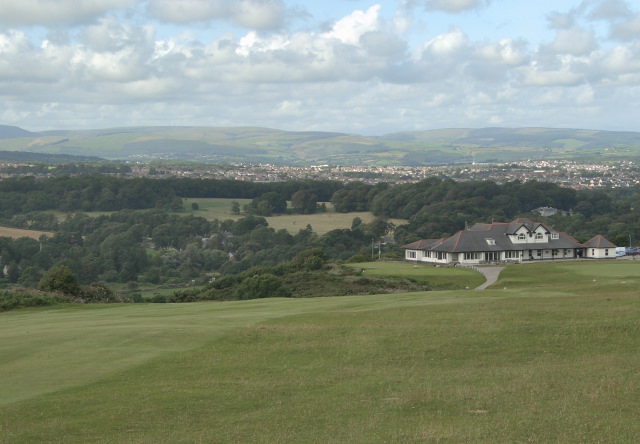
- A view northwards from Southerndown golf course

- Location in the Vale of Glamorgan
- 51°28′41″N 3°36′36″W

Club information
- Location: Southerndown, Vale of Glamorgan, Wales
- Established: 1905
- Total holes: 18

Southerndown Golf Club is a downland/links golf club in the Vale of Glamorgan, in south-east Wales, near the coast and Ogmore-by-Sea and Southerndown, in proximity to Merthyr Mawr Sand Dunes. The course lies in an open, elevated position above the Ogmore River valley and in 2001 was 6,417 yards. The course was established in 1905 and designed by Willie Fernie. Players such as Peter McEvoy, Gary Wolstenholme, Stephen Dodd, Bradley Dredge, and Gene Sarazen have all played at Southerndown. The club has held the Piccadilly Medal in 1970–71 and the Martini International and has also hosted the Welsh Amateur Golf event.
