= Waterton, Bridgend =

Coordinates: 51°29′45″N 3°32′45″W

Waterton is an area south of Bridgend, Wales. It is mainly an industrial zone, as it is home to Bridgend Industrial Estate, Waterton Industrial Estate, Waterton Park, the Ford Engine Plant & Waterton Retail Park. CGI Inc., the Global IT and business services company are located at Waterton Industrial Estate

== History ==
In mediaeval times the manor of Waterton was held from the Turbervilles, Lords of Coity. During the 14th century the Denys family held the manor from that lordship. A charter of 1379 concerns Johan Denys de Watirton being leased land by Margam Abbey at Bonvilston during the wardship of John Norreis, son and heir of John Norreis of Lachecastel. Sir Gilbert Denys (died 1422) of Siston, Gloucestershire was probably born in about 1350 in Glamorgan, probably the son of John Denys of Waterton. In 1415 Sir Gilbert Denys, by then well established in Gloucestershire, is recorded as renting land in Waterton from the late Lord of Coity, Sir Roger Berkerolles (died 1411), whose lordship was then held during the minority of his heir by Isabel de Beauchamp, suo jure Lord of Glamorgan. The Denys family are recorded in ancient Glamorgan charters, the earliest mention being in 1258, when Willelmo le Denys witnessed a charter effecting an exchange by Gilbert de Turberville, Lord of Coity, of lands in Newcastle, Glamorgan, with Margam Abbey. Clark, supported by the Denys pedigree in the "Golden Grove Book of Welsh Pedigrees" believed this William Denys to have originated in Gloucestershire and to have married a Turberville.

== Sources ==
- Clark, G. Cartae et Alia Munimenta quae ad Dominium de Glamorgan Pertinent. (6 vols.), Cardiff, 1910
- Nicholl, Lewis D. The Normans in Glamorgan, Gower & Kidwelli, Cardiff, 1936
- Golden Grove Book of Pedigrees, by anonymous author c. 1765, Carmarthenshire Archives. 2nd. part (G), Advenae of Glamorganshire, G 1026, p. 78, pedigree of Denys
