= Edward Gamage =

17th century Welsh Anglican priest

Edward Gamage was a Welsh Anglican priest in the 17th century.

Langley was born at St Brides Major and educated at St Edmund Hall, Oxford. He held livings at Coychurch, Peterstone and Ogmore. Langford was Archdeacon of Llandaff from 1668 until 1670; when he was succeeded by his son Thomas. He died in 1686.
