= Thomas Gamage =

Welsh anglican priest

Thomas Gamage was a Welsh Anglican priest in the 17th century.

The son of Edward Gamage, Archdeacon of Llandaff from 1668 to 1686, he was born at Coychurch and educated at Jesus College, Oxford. He held livings at Ubley, Penbryn, Llangyfelach and Llanedi. Gamage was Archdeacon of Llandaff from 1670 until his death in 1705.
