= Bridgend =

Town in South Wales

Coordinates: 51°30′18″N 3°34′38″W

Bridgend: Welsh: Pen-y-bont ar Ogwr
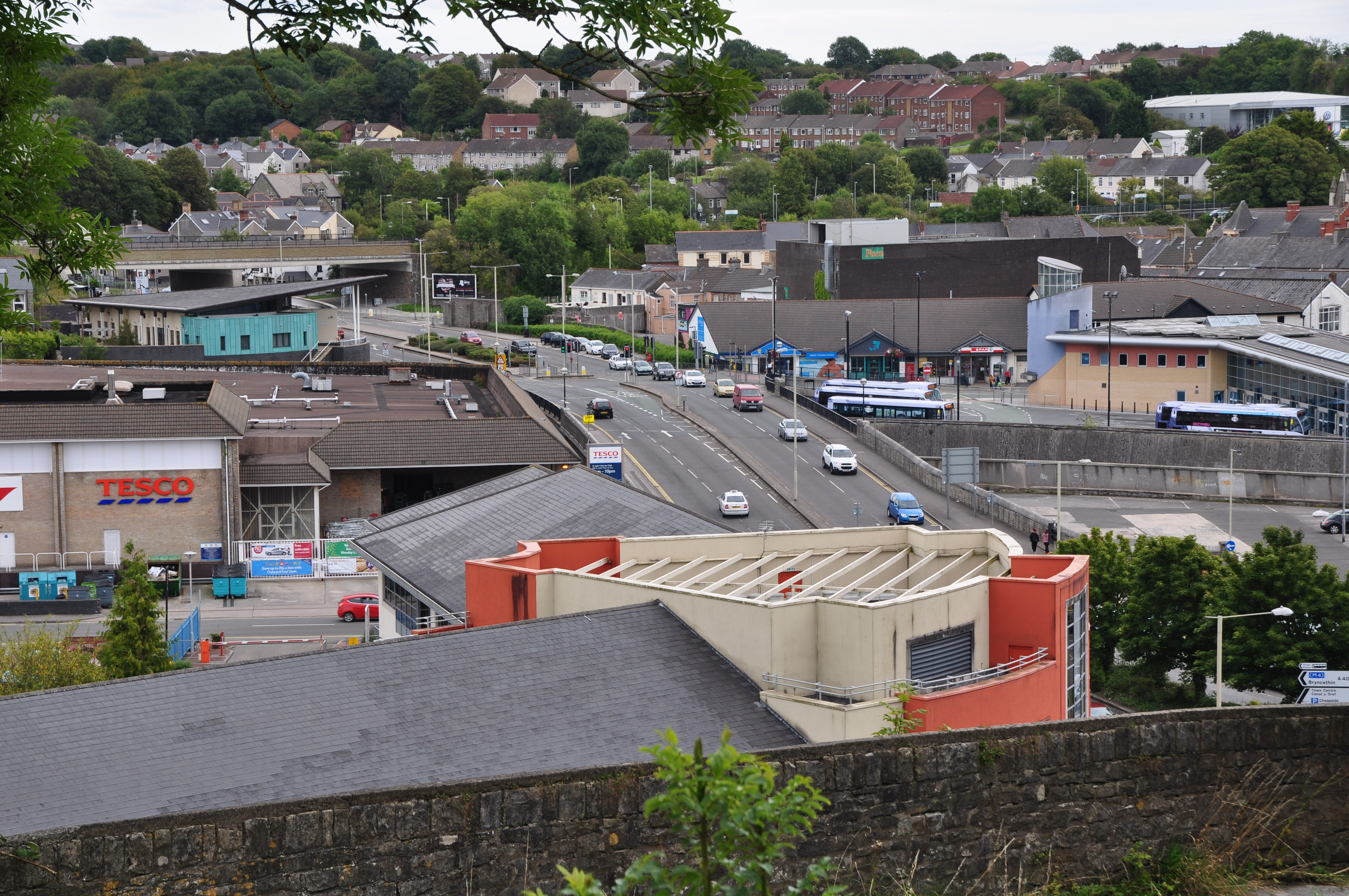
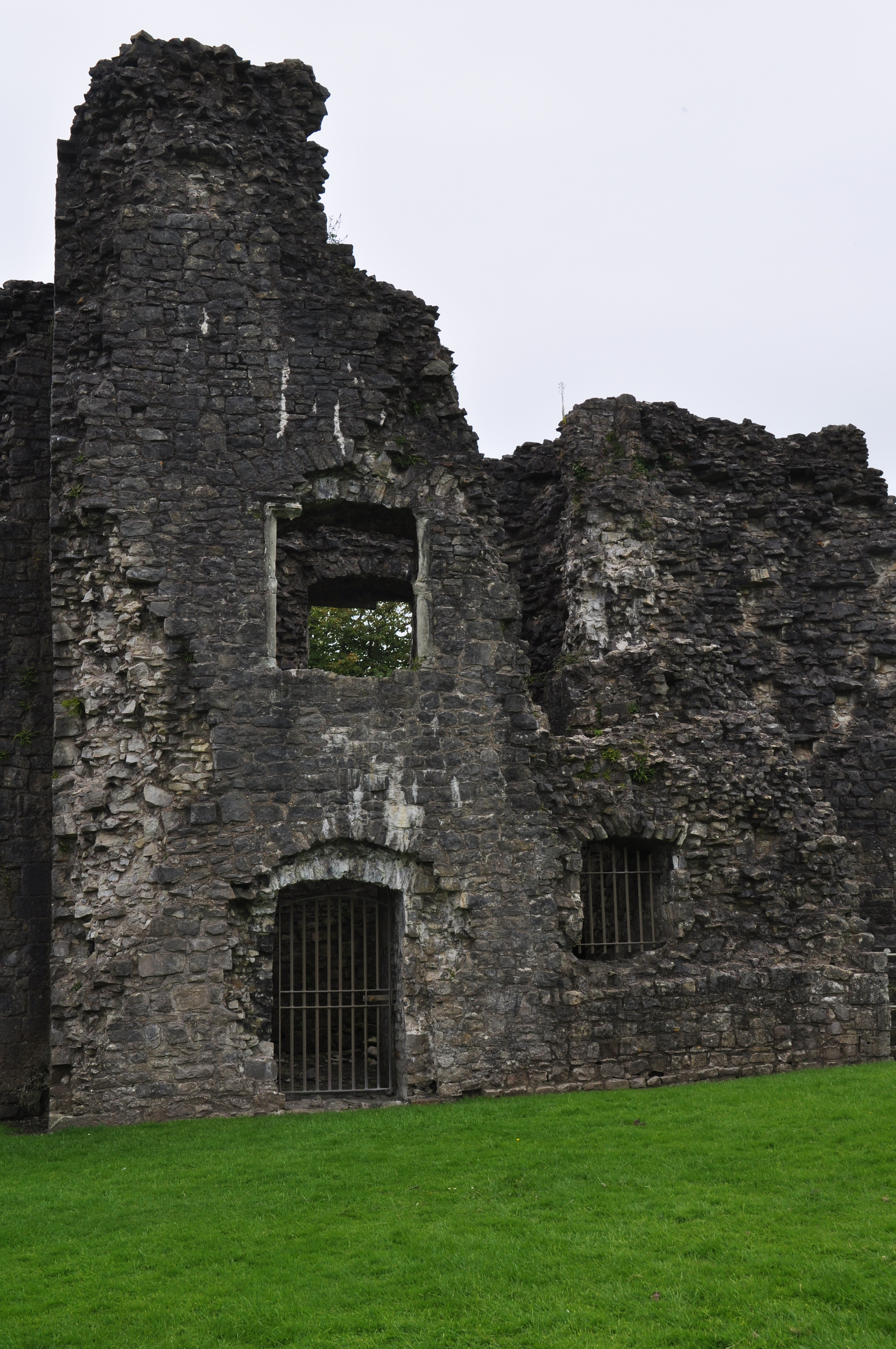
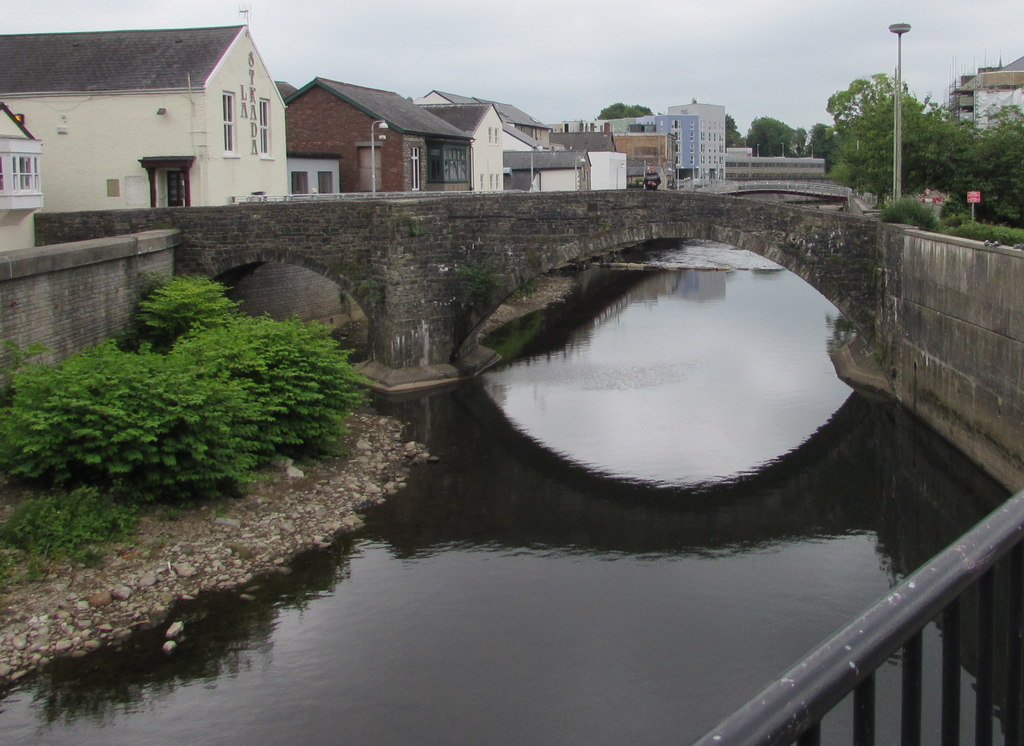
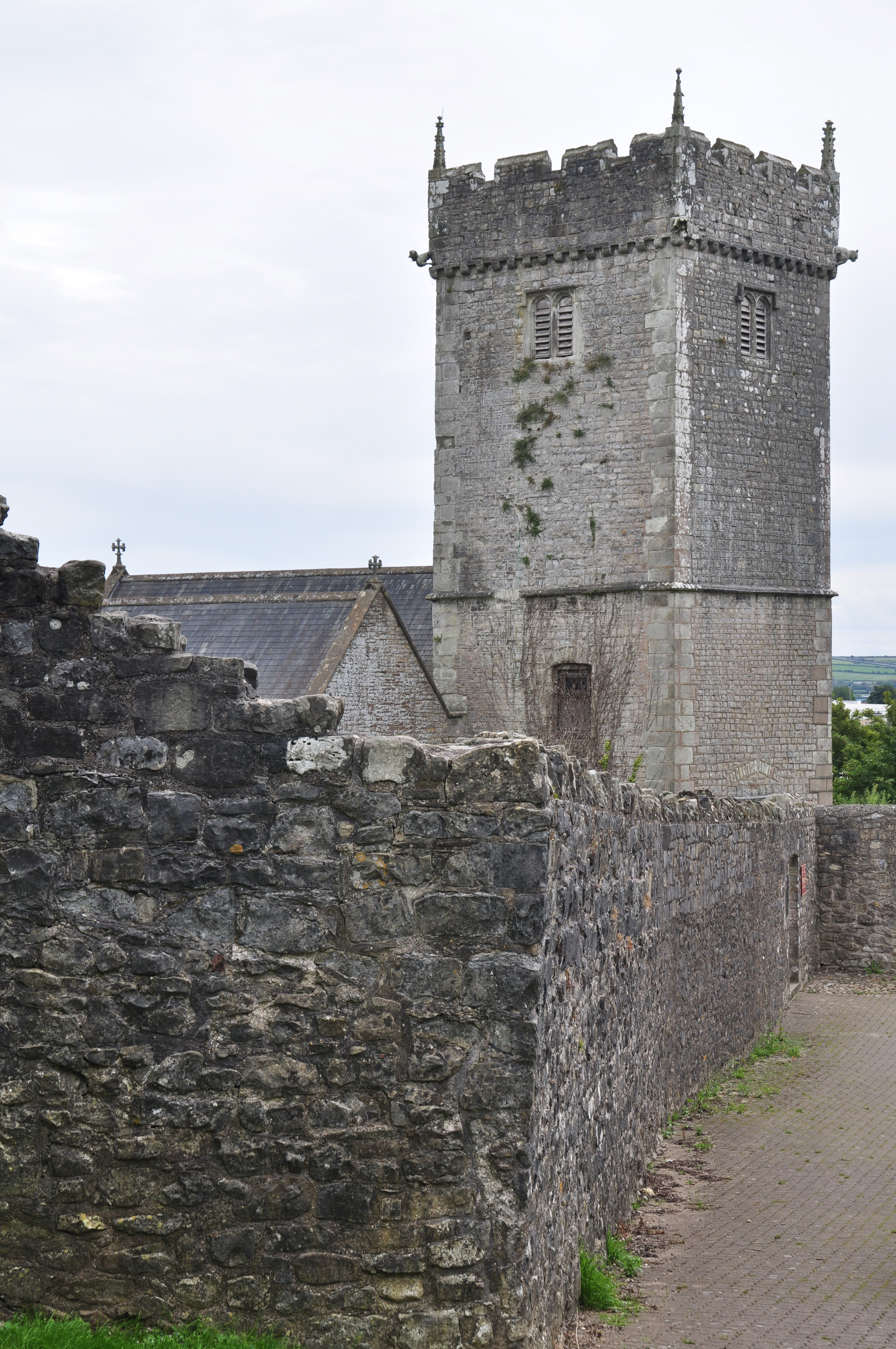
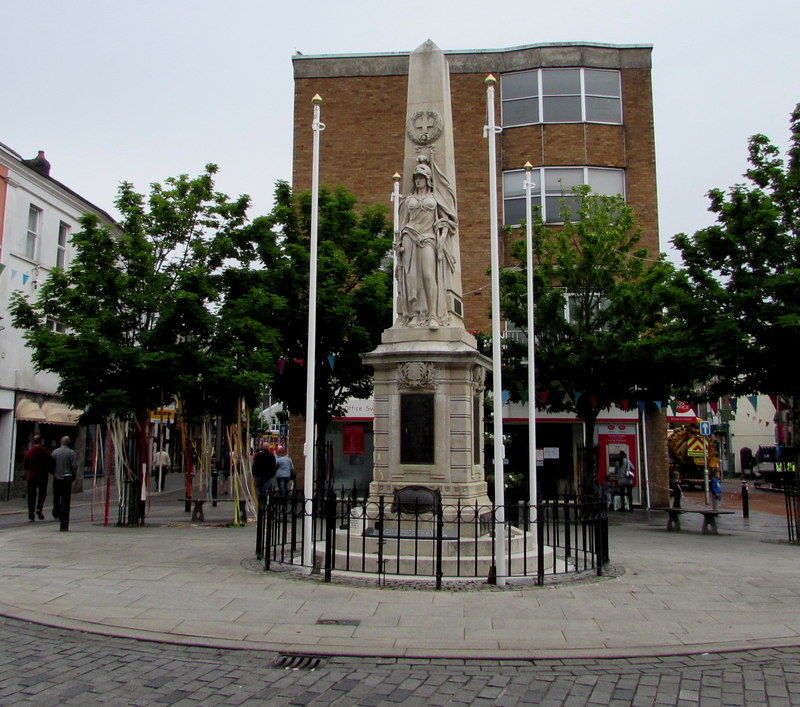
- Left to right, top: Bridgend Townscape; Middle: Newcastle Castle and Old Bridge; Bottom: St Illtyd's Church and War Memorial

- Location within Bridgend
- Population: 51,785 (2021 Census)
- OS grid reference: SS905805
- Community: Bridgend; Brackla; Coychurch Lower
- Principal area: Bridgend
- Preserved county: Mid Glamorgan
- Country: Wales
- Sovereign state: United Kingdom
- Suburbs: Districts of the town: Bridgend Industrial Estate; Broadlands; Bryntirion; Cefn Glas; Coity; Coychurch; Hencastel; Laleston; Litchard; Newcastle; Pen-y-fai; Wildmill
- Post town: BRIDGEND
- Postcode district: CF31
- Dialling code: 01656
- Police: South Wales
- Fire: South Wales
- Ambulance: Welsh
- UK Parliament: Bridgend
- Senedd Cymru – Welsh Parliament: Pen-y-bont Bro Morgannwg

Bridgend (English: /brɪˈdʒɛnd/; Welsh: Pen-y-bont ar Ogwr or just Pen-y-bont, meaning "the end of the bridge on the Ogmore") is a town in the Bridgend County Borough of Wales, 20 miles (32 km) west of Cardiff and 20 miles (32 km) east of Swansea. The town is named after the medieval bridge over the River Ogmore. The River Ewenny also flows through the town. The population was 49,597 in 2021. Bridgend is within the Cardiff Capital Region which in 2019 had a population of approximately 1.54 million.

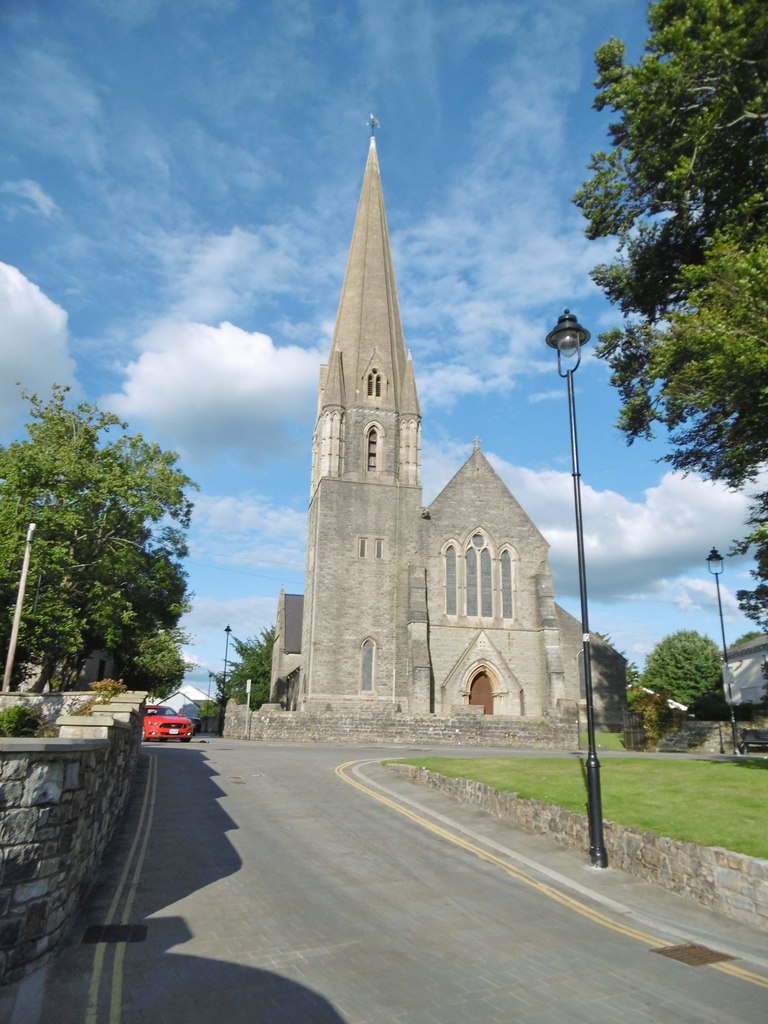
St Mary's Nolton Church, Bridgend

Historically a part of Glamorgan, Bridgend has greatly expanded in size since the early 1980s – the 2001 census recorded a population of 39,429 for the town.

== History ==
=== Prehistoric and Roman ===
Several prehistoric burial mounds have been found in the vicinity of Bridgend, suggesting that the area was settled before Roman times. The A48 between Bridgend and Cowbridge has a portion, known locally as "Crack Hill", of Roman road and the 'Golden Mile' where it is believed Roman soldiers were lined up to be paid. The Vale of Glamorgan would have been a natural low-level route west to the Roman fort and harbour at Neath (Nidum) from settlements in the east like Cardiff and Caerleon (Isca).

=== Norman invasion ===
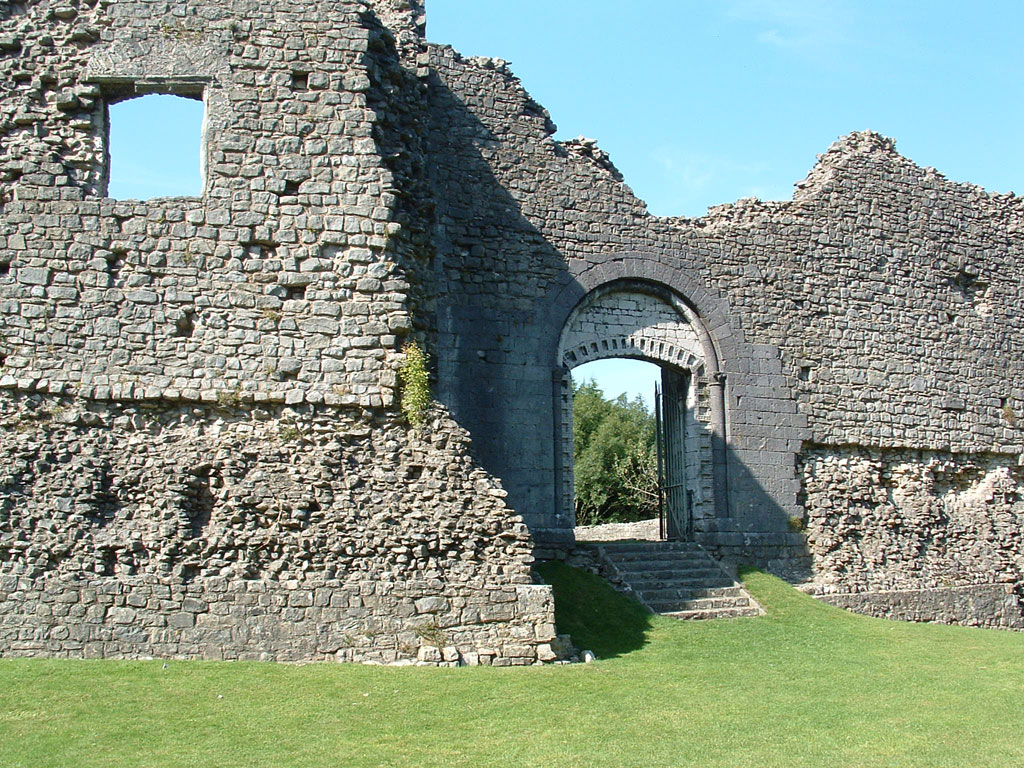
Front view of Newcastle Castle Bridgend

In the decades after the Norman Conquest of Anglo-Saxon England in 1066, the Normans looked westwards to create new seats for lords loyal to William the Conqueror. Groups of Norman barons arrived in Wales, and in the south and east created what would later become the Welsh Marches, while the north and west remained largely unconquered.

At Coity, the local Welsh chieftain Morgan Gam already had a stronghold. Sometime in the 11th century, Norman Lord Payn de Turberville approached Morgan to turn over control of Coity Castle to Turberville. Morgan Gam agreed, on condition that Turberville either fought Morgan for the land, or took Gam's daughter Sybil's hand in marriage. Turberville married Sybil and became Lord of Coity, and rebuilt the castle.

Newcastle Castle (on Newcastle Hill, overlooking the town centre, 1106) and Ogmore Castle (1116) were built by Robert Fitzhamon and William de Londres, respectively. About 2 miles (3 km) north-east of Ogmore Castle, Maurice de Londres founded the fortified Benedictine Ewenny Priory in 1141.

These three castles provided a "defensive triangle" for the area – a quadrilateral if Ewenny Priory is included.

=== Early development ===
Bridgend developed at a ford on the River Ogmore, which was on the main route between east and west Wales. Just north of the town is the confluence of three rivers, the Ogmore, the Llynfi, and the Garw. South of Bridgend, the River Ewenny merges with the River Ogmore and flows into the Bristol Channel. In the 15th century, a stone bridge was built as a permanent connection between the two sides of the Ogmore (and was later rebuilt). Originally, this bridge had four arches, but in the 18th century, a massive flood washed two of them away. The rest of the bridge still stands and remains a focal point of the town: aesthetic restoration took place in 2006.

Bridgend grew rapidly into an agricultural town. It became an important market town, a status it retained until the late 20th century.

=== Industrial era ===
The discovery of coal in the South Wales Valleys north of Bridgend had a massive impact on the town. The first coal mining operations opened north of Bridgend in the 17th century; the Llynfi Valley was the first to be industrialised. Bridgend itself never had coal deposits and remained a market town for some time, but the valleys of the three rivers grew into an important part of the South Wales coalfields. Ironworks and brickworks (notably at Tondu) were also established in the same period by John Bedford, although the ironworks faltered after his death and ceased operating entirely in 1836.

The Great Western Railway arrived and Bridgend was at the junction between the main London to Fishguard line and the branch to the three valleys. Frequent coal trains took coal down the valleys; and when the Vale of Glamorgan railway opened, coal could be sent directly to port at Barry or via other branch lines to Porthcawl.

Several quarries opened in and around Bridgend town centre; some remnants of these can still be seen today near Brackla. An engine works was opened in the town and a larger farmers' market also opened in the town centre, where it remained until the 1970s.

In 1801, the population of what is now Bridgend County was around 6000. By the beginning of the 20th century this had risen to 61,000. By this time Bridgend was a bustling market town with prosperous valleys to the north, a thriving community and good links to other towns and cities.

=== Second World War ===
In the Second World War, Bridgend had a prisoner of war (POW) camp at Island Farm and a large munitions factory (ROF Bridgend – known as the "Admiralty") at Waterton, as well as a large underground munitions storage base at Brackla (known as the 8Xs). This was an overspill of the Royal Arsenal, Woolwich.

At its peak, the arsenal had 40,000 workers, many of them women. Large numbers of them were transported by bus from the Rhondda and the valleys.

The factory complex had three sites in Bridgend, all linked together by a large network of railways. Many reminders of the factory sites remain to this day.

In March 1945, 87 POWs from Island Farm escaped through a tunnel, but all were recaptured. While Bridgend was as important during the war as any other part of Wales, and although it was photographed by the Luftwaffe, it was never blitzed, although the area immediately around Bridgend did suffer bombing raids. The admiralty ceased full-scale production in December 1945 after five years. Two of the munitions-storage magazines in the Brackla ROF site were converted to a regional government headquarters during the Cold War as part of the UK continuity of government plans. It is now in the hands of a private company.

=== After the war ===
Bridgend remained a solid market town after the war. In 1948, Newbridge Fields (a short distance from the town centre) hosted the 1948 National Eisteddfod.

In 1960, the River Ogmore burst its banks and flooded the town centre. Subsequent floods and extreme weather led the Welsh Water Authority to develop concrete flood defence walls along the banks of the River Ogmore in the town centre. The town centre has not been flooded since. During this time, Bridgend was chosen to become the headquarters for South Wales Police. This action was ideal as geographically, Bridgend stands equidistant to Swansea to the west and Cardiff to the east.

The Beeching cuts of the 1960s had the loss of passenger rail links in the Vale of Glamorgan and to the northern valleys. The Vale of Glamorgan link to Barry via Rhoose was reinstated in June 2005.

In the 1970s, Bridgend began to see the catalyst of arguably its biggest growth period. The "missing section" of the M4 motorway was constructed around the town, plans were afoot to change the Waterton Admiralty into an industrial estate, and the water supply was improved including new sewage treatment works near Ogmore. Two major multinational corporations, the Ford Motor Company and Sony, set up factories in or on the outskirts of the new Bridgend Industrial Estate (former Waterton Arsenal).

The development of the Brackla Housing Estate in the 1980s, housing developments at Broadlands to the south-west of the town centre and the continuing expansion of Brackla to the north-east have caused Bridgend's population to swell dramatically. Due to this, traffic congestion and a perceived shortage of parking facilities within the town have become important issues in the area. In 1997, a new link road/bypass was built to link the town centre directly to the M4 motorway, as well as redirect traffic around the town centre.

A new Securicor-operated prison (HM Parc Prison) was built near Coity in the late 1990s. The prison opened in November 1997.

The McArthur Glen Designer Outlet opened in 1998.

=== New millennium ===
Objective 1 investment in regeneration and public realm improvements has led to the pedestrianisation of the town centre and the restoration of some buildings. Some local traders have argued that this has damaged trade because of reduced access for taxis and people with disabilities. Car parking provision and pricing have also been a concern to retailers with calls for free or reduced-price parking to increase town centre visits.

To counteract the dominance of Tesco in the area, Asda were granted planning permission for a new superstore near the town centre. The store was opened on 31 March 2008 by the local MP, and players from Bridgend Ravens.

In 2004, an award-winning new bus station was constructed and traffic movements around the town centre were altered. Local committees, together with the council, started to use the pedestrianisation of the town centre to its advantage, culminating in several fairs including Continental Markets, Celtic Festivals, a small Mardi-Gras, and seasonal markets and events. Bridgend Council estimated in 2009 that these events have brought 900,000 visitors to the town and generated around £53 million for the local economy.

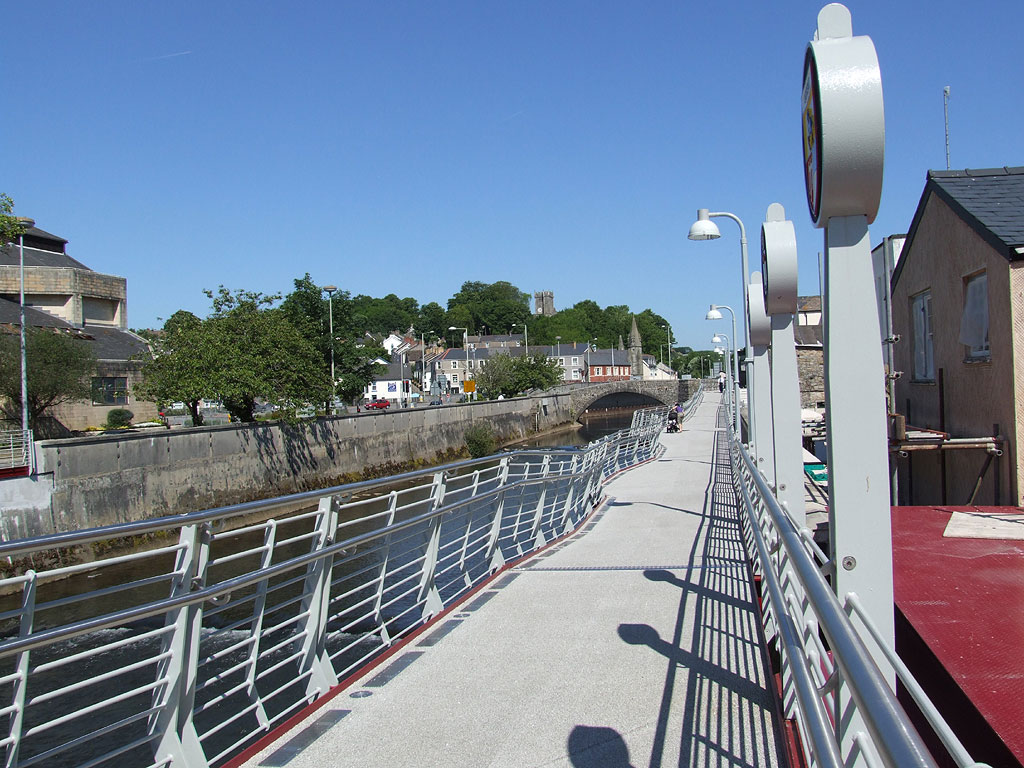
Riverside walk over the Ogmore 2009

About £2.5 million of European funding was used to create a "riverside café culture" by constructing a walkway along the River Ogmore, which was completed in March 2009.

=== Future developments ===
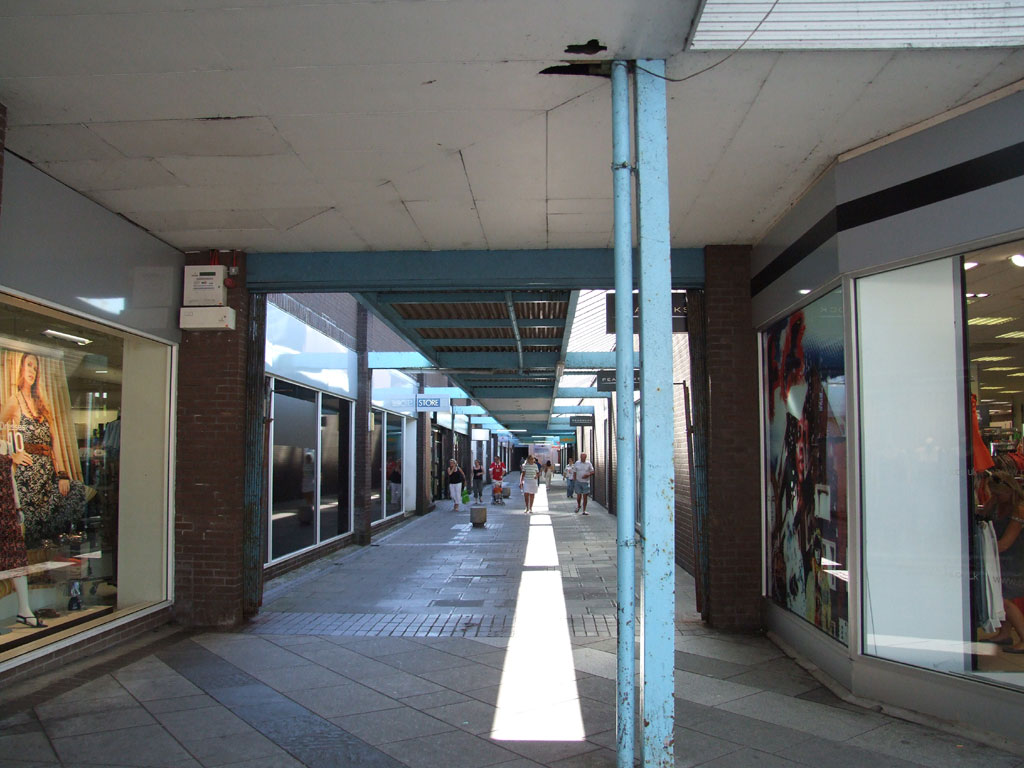
Old Cheapside

Construction on a 1500-home sustainable "village" at Parc Derwen near Coity began in 2011. The scheme was a collaboration between several house-builders and public bodies including the National Assembly, and was planned with strict guidelines regarding architecture and the environment. Concerns exist from Coity in particular that this development may impact on their village's identity.

Studies were carried out by the local council with a view to improving retail provision in the town centre. Attracting bigger high-street chains to the town, such as Marks & Spencer, Next, and Debenhams is seen as key to this.

At Elder Yard, a derelict Grade II-listed building in the heart of the town centre, which in 2009 was due to be converted to a restaurant and provide the impetus for other town improvements, including a public courtyard and extra retail and leisure provision.

== Politics ==
As of July 2024, the local Member of Parliament is Chris Elmore (Welsh Labour), the Member of the Senedd for Bridgend is Sarah Murphy (Labour) along with the regional members for the South Wales West region: Luke Fletcher (Plaid Cymru), Thomas Giffard (Conservative), Altaf Hussain (Conservative) and Sioned Williams (Plaid Cymru).

=== Local government ===
Bridgend County Borough Council is led by the Welsh Labour Party, which has been running a majority administration since the May 2022 local elections, where the Labour party gained ten seats to finish on 27 out of a possible 51 seats. At those elections Independents won 21 seats, Plaid Cymru 2 and the Conservatives 1. A few weeks after the elections Labour lost the ward of Bridgend Central in a by-election to an independent candidate reducing the Labour group to 26 and increasing the independent group to 22.

Following the 2012 election, the council was made up of 39 Labour councillors, 10 Independents, 3 Liberal Democrats, 1 Conservative and 1 Plaid Cymru. The Youth Mayor of Bridgend County Borough as of 2017 is Niamh Gwilym, and the Deputy Youth Mayor is Leigh Williams.

Bridgend was an electoral ward to Glamorgan County Council from 1889 to 1974, electing the Earl of Dunraven as its first representative. Since 1995 the town has been covered by three wards to Bridgend County Borough Council, Morfa, Oldcastle and Newcastle, which each elect two councillors.

At the Town Council level, Bridgend is represented by nineteen town councillors on Bridgend Town Council, elected from the three town wards of Morfa, Oldcastle and Newcastle.

== Demography ==
According to the 2021 Census, the population of the town and its urban area was 51,785. Of those residents, the demographics of the town were recorded as:

=== Ethnicity ===
- 94.9% White
- 2.5% Asian
- 1.7% Mixed
- 0.5% Black
- 0.1% other

=== Religious ===
- 54% no religion
- 43.6% Christianity
- 1% Islam
- 0.6% other
- 0.4% Buddhism
- 0.3% Hinduism
- 0.1% Sikhism
- 0.1% Judaism

== Economy ==
Bridgend's travel to work area has expanded since 1991 and the 2001-based area now incorporates the western part of the Vale of Glamorgan.

Bridgend recovered quickly from the decline of traditional industries, particularly coal-mining due to other alternative forms of employment. Wages are generally higher here than in other parts of the South Wales valleys. There are large industrial estates at Bridgend and Waterton (formerly Waterton Admiralty) which host a number of small-scale and multi-national companies, mainly manufacturing.

Ford's engine plant near Waterton used to employ around 2,000 workers and was one of the area's largest employers, working on range of low carbon "EcoBoost" engines. The plant won praise from Peter Mandelson in January 2009 who described it as "a top-of-the-class, world-beating engine production plant." Ford invested £315 million in the Bridgend plant between 2004 and 2009. The Ford plant closed in September 2020.

IT Consultancy Group CGI have an office in Bridgend, and Lidl has also set up its Welsh headquarters and distribution site at Waterton. Zoobiotic, a company specialising in maggot therapy, has its facility near Bridgend town centre. Also, since 1983, the dart board producer Winmau has based its global headquarters in Bridgend.

Others include Ortho-Clinical Diagnostics, Staedtler, engineering consultancy Skanska, aeronautic maintenance and project management company TES Aviation and home accessories manufacturer Dekor plc. The Semiconductor Photomask Company, Photronics Inc, has a manufacturing operation at the Ewenny Science Park.

However, there have been significant economic blows to Bridgend including Sony's closure of the Bridgend plant and downsizing of the Pencoed plant. The plant is still Sony's biggest in the UK despite this. Other manufacturers to have pulled out of the area include Wrigley Company and Dairy Farmers of Britain which went into receivership in June 2009.

Bridgend has a lack of high-wage service jobs; however the retail sector in particular provides a large proportion of employment in the town and borough. In 2008, there were 13,100 people in Bridgend County working in construction and manufacturing, while 42,900 were working in the service sector.

Sub-regional GVA for the Bridgend & Neath Port Talbot NUTS3 region stood at £12,402 per capita in 2006 ($23,191 at June 2006 values). This figure represents 65% of the UK GVA per capita, 87% of Welsh GVA per capita (£14,226) and 103% of West Wales & The Valleys GVA per capita (£12,071).

Gross disposable income for Bridgend & Neath Port Talbot in 2006 stood at £3,338 million or £12,379 per head. This was 88% of UK per head figure (£14,053) and slightly above the Welsh per head figure (£12,366).

In 2008, the average full-time gross weekly earnings in Swansea, Bridgend & Neath Port Talbot was £484.20 (£531.70 for men, £426.10 for women). This was 97% of the Welsh average (£498.10).

In the first half of 2009, unemployment in Bridgend County Borough stood at 8.9% and economic inactivity stood at 21.4%.

The percentage of workless households in December 2008 stood at 20.6% compared to the UK average of 16% and the Welsh average of 18.8%.

=== Shopping ===
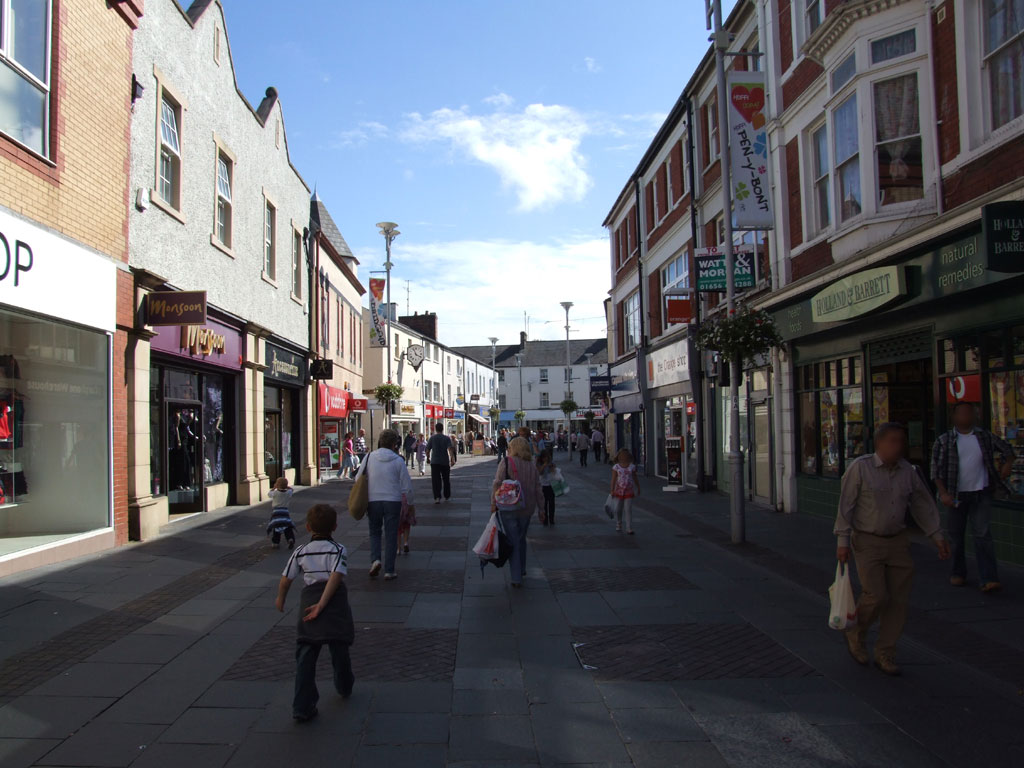
Adare Street Bridgend 2008

In the town centre the main retail shopping areas are the Rhiw Shopping Centre (containing Bridgend Market), Adare Street, Caroline Street, Derwen Road, Nolton Street, Queen Street, Dunraven Place, Market Street and Cheapside (home of the Brackla Street Centre and Asda store). These are near the bus and railway stations and pay and display car parks.

There are out-of-town shopping areas at Waterton, near the A473, on Cowbridge Road and at The Derwen, Junction 36 of the M4, home to the Bridgend Designer Outlet.

== Transport ==
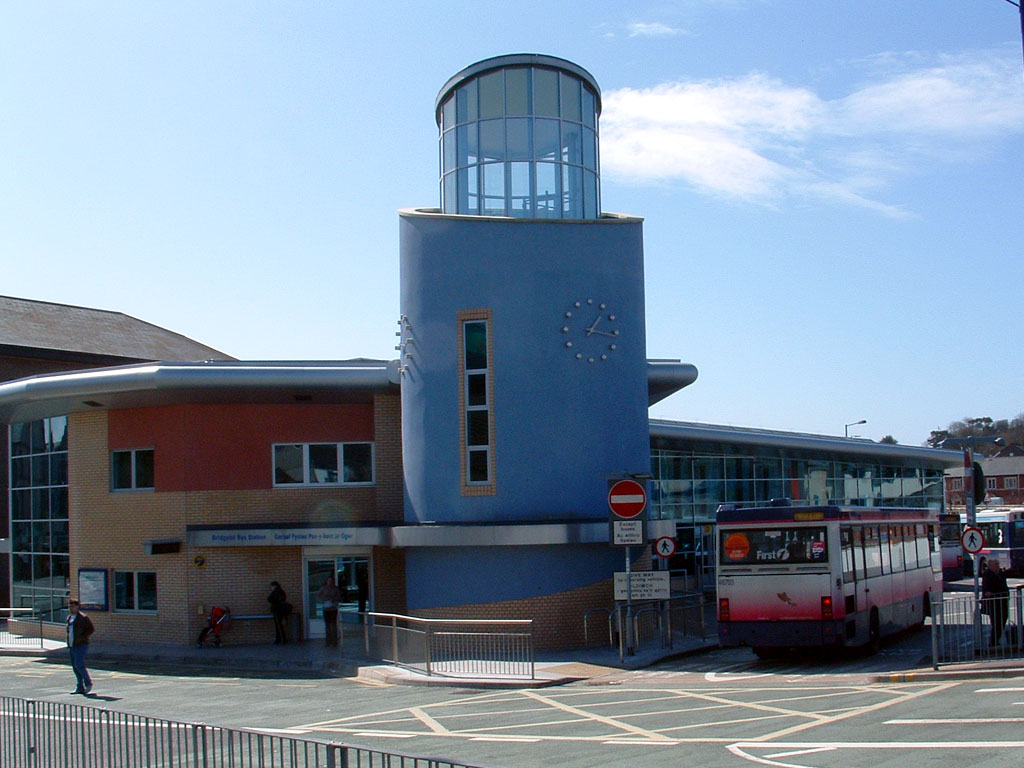
Bridgend's bus station in 2004

Bridgend railway station has regular services to Cardiff Central, Bristol Parkway and London Paddington to the east; Port Talbot Parkway, Neath, Swansea and the West Wales Line to the west; and Maesteg to the north. There are also services to Manchester Piccadilly. Bridgend is the western terminus of the Vale of Glamorgan Line which reopened to passenger traffic in 2005.

Wildmill railway station, about 1 mile (2 km) north of Bridgend railway station, serves the estates of Wildmill, Pendre and Litchard and is on the Bridgend-Maesteg branch line. A park and ride station at Brackla, about 1.5 miles (2.4 km) south-east of Bridgend railway station is planned and is due to be constructed once capacity improvements have been made to the South Wales Main Line. Services to a new railway station in Llanharan began in December 2007.

Bridgend bus station has services to urban and rural areas in South Wales. Most services are operated by First Cymru under the "Bridgend & County" livery.

An east–west cycle route has been constructed from Brackla through to Broadlands and into Cefn Glas. Bridgend is on the National Cycle Route and there are off-road spurs from the Celtic Trail to the town centre and a community route in the Ogmore Valley. Glyncorrwg and the Afan Valley about 12 miles (19 km) north of Bridgend near Maesteg is famed for its mountain bike trails.

For scheduled and chartered air travel, Bridgend is served by Cardiff International Airport, to which there are direct rail and bus services.

== Education ==
Bridgend town has four comprehensive schools: Coleg Cymunedol Y Dderwen Archbishop McGrath Catholic Comprehensive, Brynteg Comprehensive School, Bryntirion Comprehensive School, and pencoed comprehensive school. Brynteg generally serves the area east of the River Ogmore, while Bryntirion serves the areas west of the river.

Brynteg is renowned for its rugby alumni, including J. P. R. Williams, Rob Howley, Gavin Henson, Mike Hall and Dafydd James; many talented athletes at other local schools join Brynteg to play for the school in the Welsh School Rugby Union leagues. The school has produced several Welsh rugby union internationals, and prominent athletes in other sports have also attended, including female cyclist Nicole Cooke. Bryntirion has also produced sporting talent, including Gareth Llewellyn and triathlete Marc Jenkins. Archbishop McGrath School covers the whole of the county, and moved to a new campus at Brackla in 2011.

At least nine primary, junior schools, and infant schools are in the town, though several of the junior and infant schools have merged to form single primary schools in recent years.

Also, two special-educational needs schools are there: Heronsbridge School which is linked with Brynteg Comprehensive School and at the back of Bridgend College. It is for students of primary and secondary school ages with severe learning disabilities. Another school, Ysgol Bryn Castell, offers education for Key Stage 1–4 students with moderate to severe learning disabilities; it is linked with Bryntirion Comprehensive School and has opened up a satellite unit at Cynffig Comprehensive School, a few miles west of Bridgend.

Bridgend College is the town's further education and higher education provider; it primarily offers vocational courses and GCSEs. It attracts school-leavers from as far as Swansea and Cardiff. It offers a range of higher-education courses such as Postgraduate Certificate in Education, Higher National Certificate, and Higher National Diploma in various subjects and master's programmes at its Queens Road campus on Bridgend Industrial Estate. These are mainly franchised from the University of South Wales. The Pencoed Campus has a focus on sport, animal care, and horticulture, and Maesteg Campus offers more community-based programmes.

Bridgend College has its own residence for students aged 16+ with learning difficulties and physical disabilities who come to the college from all over Wales.

== Health ==
Since the closure and redevelopment of Bridgend General Hospital in the 1990s, acute-care and accident and emergency services have been provided by the Princess of Wales Hospital. GP's surgeries are scattered throughout the town, as are dentists. There is also a large psychiatric hospital, Glanrhyd Hospital, near Pen-y-fai.

== Culture ==
=== Nightlife ===
Several pubs, restaurants and a nightclub are located within the town centre.

In December 2008, Bridgend Council introduced its first alcohol-free zone, restricting the consumption of alcohol to pubs, clubs, and other licensed premises in the town centre to help address alcohol-related issues. CCTV is in operation throughout the town centre, and usually police have a presence of some form. Since July 2007, the streets of Bridgend are also patrolled on Friday and Saturday evenings by Street Pastors, an inter-denominational church response to urban problems, engaging with people on the streets.

=== Music ===
Funeral for a Friend and Jayce Lewis have both received mainstream and commercial recognition, while rock/metal act Bullet for My Valentine contributed to the meteoric uprising in the mid-2000s metal music industry. Along with Those Damn Crows, they have all received national and international chart success. Several smaller venues in and around the town centre, including The New Angel Inn, The Railway Inn, Barracudas and Sapphires, host a number of open-mic nights. Bryan Adams played to a 15,000 crowd at Brewery Field stadium in the town in 2006. The Recreation Centre has hosted acts such as Fall Out Boy and Bring Me the Horizon.

=== Eisteddfodau ===
Bridgend hosted the National Eisteddfod in 1948. Bridgend County hosted the Urdd Gobaith Cymru National Eisteddfod in 2017.

=== Media ===
Television signals are received from the Wenvoe TV transmitter and the local relay transmitter situated in Llangeinor. Bridgend is served by several Independent Local Radio stations: Bridge FM, Heart South Wales, Nation Radio Wales and Celtica radio. The main local newspaper is The Glamorgan Gazette, although a free newspaper, The Recorder, has increased its circulation in recent times. Around Town magazine is the free local lifestyle magazine for Bridgend.

=== Twinning ===
Bridgend has twinning arrangements with:

- Langenau, Germany
- Villenave-d'Ornon, France

Talks held to twin Bridgend with the city of Tripoli in Libya between 2004 and 2009 sparked debate.

== Sport ==
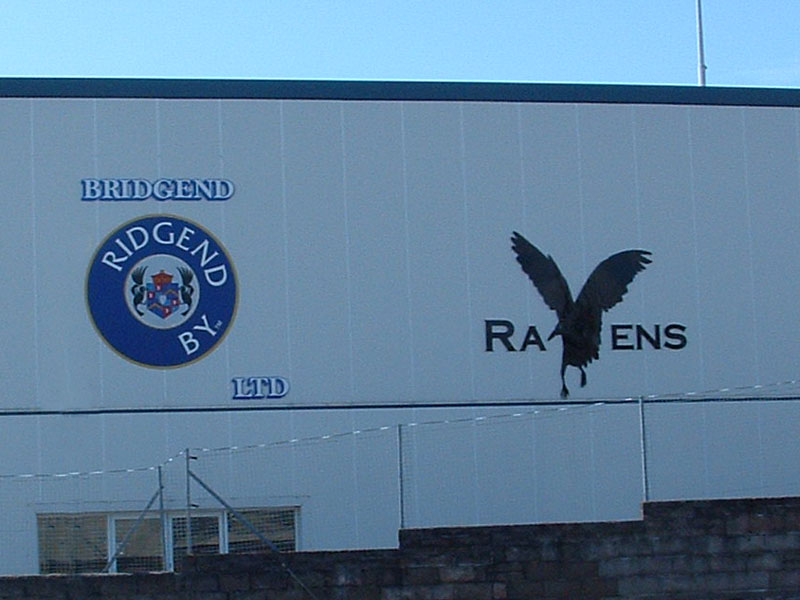
Rear view of the Brewery Field's west stadium displaying the Bridgend Ravens insignia in 2006

=== Rugby union ===
Bridgend Ravens Bridgend Ravens (formally Bridgend RFC) are a semi-professional rugby union team which formed in 1878 and play in the Welsh Premier Division. They play their home matches at the Brewery Field, which has been their home on and off since 1920. The club have been Welsh champions five times and have won the WRU Challenge Cup on two occasions, whilst also winning the WRU Division One West league in 2011 and numerous sevens competitions over the course of their existence. They have also played against international teams, New Zealand won on their visit in 1978, but Bridgend have beaten Italy, Western Samoa and Australia. The club has also hosted international matches at women and age grade.

Bridgend Athletic Bridgend Athletic RFC was reformed in 1972, after the Bridgend Youth team members in that year wanted to form a senior team so they didn't have to go their separate ways into senior rugby, hence the formation of the club which had previously existed up to 1939. The club become full members of the Welsh Rugby Union in 1983. The club were promoted from Division 5 Central in 2001, were WRU Division Four East Champions in 2002, were then promoted from Division 3 to WRU Division Two West in 2003 through the league organisation and were promoted to Division 1 in 2004. They have suffered relegation from that league once, but bounced back in 2009, winning WRU Division Two West. They play in WRU Division One West.

Bridgend Sports Bridgend Sports Rugby Football Club is a Welsh rugby union team based in Bridgend. Formed in 1938 by Victor Blick, the team survived the cessation of club rugby in Wales between 1939 and 1945, during the Second World War. There have been in existence at least two other clubs in Bridgend throughout the club's history providing local competition. The club is a member of the Welsh Rugby Union and play in the WRU Division Four South East. They won the Glamorgan County Silver Ball Trophy on three successive years between 1979 and 1981, and were champions of WRU Division Five South Central in 2010.

Celtic Warriors

The Celtic Warriors, formed in 2003, are a defunct regional rugby union team that was mainly based at the Brewery Field in Bridgend. When regional rugby was enforced by the Welsh Rugby Union, Bridgend RFC and Pontypridd RFC, who were both professional clubs at the time, merged to create the Celtic Warriors as one of the five new regional rugby teams in Wales. However, they were dissolved after one season due to financial problems that had plagued the club. Pontypridd RFC had sold their share of the region early on due to their own financial difficulties, with the remaining share which had been owned by Bridgend RFC, being sold off to the Welsh Rugby Union at the end of the season. This led to the winding up of the Celtic Warriors region by the WRU, as there was not enough money to keep the region afloat. There were high points for the region: 10,000 spectators watched them face European champions-in-waiting London Wasps and even beat the Wasps 9–14 at Adam's Park a week earlier. The team finished 4th out of 12 in the Celtic League in their only season of existence.

Ospreys Rugby

The Ospreys were formed in 2003 after the merger of Neath RFC and Swansea RFC, which took place after the Welsh Rugby Union forced through regional rugby as the top level of Welsh rugby. Bridgend became part of this region following the demise of the Celtic Warriors. Although the Ospreys play their home matches at the Liberty Stadium in Swansea, since 2010 they have played their home Anglo-Welsh Cup home games at the Brewery Field, which is normally two games a season.

=== Football ===
Bridgend had two football teams, Bridgend Town A.F.C., and a Bridgend suburb side Bryntirion Athletic F.C. that played in the Welsh Football League First Division. Bridgend Town AFC from 2009 played at The Brewery Field (The Football Club purchased The Brewery Field in 2009) as the club sold its ground at Coychurch Road ground due to works in conjunction with the new Asda store. In 2013, the two clubs joined to form Pen-y-Bont F.C. who, following promotion in 2019, play in the Cymru Premier, the top level of Welsh football. They are currently managed by Rhys Griffiths. Schools football in Bridgend is governed by the Bridgend Schools FA.

Bridgend's geographical position means South Wales rivals Cardiff City and Swansea City pick up support from the town.

=== Rugby league ===
Bridgend was home to Super League rugby league team the Crusaders, who were based at the Brewery Field, home of rugby union club, Bridgend RFC. This side was considered by a few to be a replacement for the Celtic Warriors rugby union side after their controversial disbanding in 2004 but also built up a loyal following in their own right. The Crusaders' application for a Super League licence was granted by the Rugby Football League on 22 July 2008. The decision elevated the club from National League One to compete in Super League XIV from 2009.

For the 2010 Super League season, Crusaders initially announced they would play at Newport's Rodney Parade ground for two seasons. However, in the run up to the new season the Celtic Crusaders franchise was sold by owner Leighton Samuel to Wrexham Football Club parent company, Wrexham Village Ltd and the side moved to Wrexham, playing home fixtures at The Racecourse Ground.

Bridgend's second rugby league side is the Bridgend Blue Bulls, one of the UK's most successful amateur clubs having won two UK national amateur titles in four years and Welsh Champions five years in succession. The Bulls played at Coychurch Road but following the announcement about the setting up of the Celtic Crusaders they were invited to play at the Brewery Field by the owner Leighton Samuel. One year on they were refused permission to continue playing at the Brewery Field in the middle of the season. They were then aided by Porthcawl RFC and staged the remaining 2006 home games at the Porthcawl ground. Subsequently, Porthcawl RFC have become their regular home and staged an amateur rugby league international there during 2008 (Wales v Ireland).

=== Other sports ===
Bridgend has local cricket clubs including Bridgend Town CC and Great Western CC, a men's and women's hockey club, golf courses, and tennis and bowls facilities at the local club, the Bridgend Lawn Tennis and Bowls Association.

== Notable people ==
See Category:People from Bridgend and Category:People from Bridgend County Borough

- Aneurin Barnard (actor)
- Gerald Battrick (tennis player)
- Jonathan Brown (footballer)
- Downtown Julie Brown (actress)
- Steve Brace (Olympic marathon runner)
- Paul Burston (author and journalist)
- Lee Byrne (rugby union player)
- Nicole Cooke (cyclist)
- Peter Cottrell (historian and writer)
- Mika Chunuonsee (footballer)
- Danie Cox/Centric aka Gobby Holder (singer)
- Matt Crowell (footballer)
- Aled Davies (Paralympian)
- Deddie Davies (actor)
- Rhys Davies (European Tour golfer)
- Rhys Day (footballer)
- Ryan Day (snooker player)
- Leondre Devries of Bars and Melody, (rapper)
- Mark Donovan (actor)
- Huw Edwards (journalist and newsreader)
- Rhian Edwards (poet)
- David Emanuel (fashion designer)
- Green Gartside (born Paul Julian Strohmeyer), singer, songwriter, musician and frontman of Scritti Politti
- Scott Gibbs (rugby union player)
- Ray Giles (rugby union player)
- Mike Hall (rugby union player)
- Gavin Henson (rugby union player)
- Rob Howley (rugby union player)
- Jonathan Humphreys (rugby union player)
- Dafydd James (rugby union player)
- Marc Jenkins (Olympic triathlete)
- Alex Jones (cricketer)
- Carwyn Jones (politician, First Minister of Wales)
- Ruth Jones (actress)
- Dewi Lake (rugby union player)
- Amanda Levete (architect)
- Jayce Lewis (musician/producer)
- Gareth Llewellyn (rugby union player)
- Sean McCarthy (footballer)
- Howard Marks (drug smuggler and author)
- William Morgan (physician, physicist and statistician)
- Sir Morien Morgan (aeronautical engineer)
- Josh Navidi (rugby union player)
- Mary De la Beche Nicholl (alpinist, entomologist, traveller)
- Alan Phillips (rugby union player)
- Leeroy Reed (musician)
- Billy Rees (footballer)
- Nathan Stephens (Paralympian)
- Steve Strange (singer)
- Owen Teale (actor)
- Gareth Thomas (rugby union and league player)
- John Thomas (Royal Harpist to Queen Victoria)
- Helen Tucker (2008 World Triathlon champion)
- Matthew Tuck (Singer)
- Bradley Wadlan (cricketer)
- Rhys Webb (rugby union player)
- David Williams (crime writer)
- J. J. Williams (rugby union player)
- J. P. R. Williams (rugby union player)

== Bands associated with Bridgend ==
- Bullet for My Valentine
- Jayce Lewis
- Hondo Maclean
- Funeral for a Friend
- The Featherz
- The Partisans
- Those Damn Crows

== See also ==
- Bridgend suicide incidents
- Bridgend (UK Parliament constituency) Bridgend County
