= Bridgend Schools FA =

- Founded: 2007
- Country: Wales
- Confederation: WSFA
- Divisions: Bridgend Schools FA Premiership; Bridgend Schools FA Championship
- Number of clubs: 18
- Domestic cup(s): Bridgend Schools Challenge Cup; Bridgend Schools Challenge Plate
- International cup(s): New Directions Football Cup; Welsh Schools Cup
- Current champions: Nottage Primary School (2010-11)
- Website: https://web.archive.org/web/20120326032357/http://www.bridgendschoolsfa.net/
- Current: 2010-11

The Bridgend Schools Football Association (Welsh: Cymdeithas Bêl-droed yn ysgol Pen-y-Bont; BSFA) is the governing body of association football in schools in Bridgend, Wales. The association has the ultimate responsibility for the control and development of football for schools in Bridgend County Borough.

It runs numerous competitions, including the association's annual Challenge Cup. It is also responsible for appointing the management structure of the Bridgend County teams at various age levels.

== Formation ==
The association was formed in July 2007 as the "Bridgend Schools Football League" and became the first unified football league to run in Bridgend schools.

The first season consisted of six schools. Since then, the number of participants increased more than three-fold, with 20 schools currently participating in the association's various competitions.

Some schools only participate in the Cup competitions, of which there are two. The BSFA Challenge Cup and the BSFA Plate. The Challenge Cup Final is held on a weekend at a neutral ground and is held as a real FA Cup final - players have to respect the cup protocol and wear shirts and ties to the event which is watched by several dignitaries.

== History ==
=== League Champions ===
Season	Premiership Winner	Points	Runner-up	Points	Championship Winner	Points	Runner-up	Points
2007/08	Corneli Primary School	28	Nottage Primary School	15	N/A	N/A	N/A	N/A
2008/09	Corneli Primary School	40	St. John's School	29	N/A	N/A	N/A	N/A
2009/10	Corneli Primary School	21	Nottage Primary School	21	Llangewydd Junior School	24	Pencoed Primary School	21
2010/11	Nottage Primary School	38	Corneli Primary School	23	N/A	N/A	N/A	N/A

=== Cup Champions ===
Season	Cup Winners	Finalists	Plate Winners	Finalists
2007/08	N/A	N/A	N/A	N/A
2008/09	Corneli Primary School	Nottage Primary School*	N/A	N/A
2009/10	Nottage Primary School	Corneli Primary School	Ysgol y Ferch o'r Sger	Pîl Primary School
2010/11	Pîl Primary School	Nottage Primary School	Newton Primary School	Llangewydd Junior School

*Porthcawl Primary School won their semi-final against Nottage Primary School on penalties, but were unable to field a team for the final.
