= ROF Bridgend =

Coordinates: 51.49974°N 3.553734°W

ROF Bridgend, (Filling Factory No. 2), located in Bridgend, South Wales, was one of the largest of sixteen World War II, UK government-owned, Royal Ordnance Factory munitions Filling Factories. Of great significance to the Britain's war effort, at its peak of production it employed around 40,000 people — said to be the largest ever factory in Britain's history.

== Background ==
At the end of World War I, much of Britain's armaments manufacturing capacity was run down, as its capacity was no longer needed. In the period leading up to World War II, consideration was given to Britain's war capability. As shown in the Spanish Civil War, the Luftwaffe were more than capable of accurately bombing many of Britain's key installations, which were also undersized to meet forecast required volumes.

In 1935, it was therefore agreed to keep armaments research at the Woolwich Arsenal in south-east London, while production would be transferred to two new factories at ROF Chorley in Lancashire (Filling Factory No.1) and ROF Bridgend in Glamorgan (Filling Factory No.2). As war planning progressed, it would be realised that this plan was flawed in both sustainability and capacity, and additional facilities would have to be built. Staff from the Royal Arsenal helped design and, in some cases, managed the construction of many of the new Royal Ordnance Factories (ROFs) and ROF Filling Factories. Just over 40 ROFs were opened by the end of World War II, nearly half of them Filling Factories, together with a similar number of factories built and run by private companies, such as ICI's Nobel Explosives (although these explosive factories were not called ROFs).

== Development ==
Bridgend was chosen for three main reasons:

- It was remote from the areas most vulnerable to enemy bombing in south and east England
- Bridgend was located in a national development area, having a plentiful supply of unemployed labour at the time
- The area enjoyed excellent logistics, being close to three major ports (Cardiff, Swansea, Barry), and close to the massive South Wales coalfield to supply power and Port Talbot for steel

In April 1936, 900 acres (3.6 km^{2}) of land in Waterton was compulsorily purchased. The site chosen was farmland next to the Great Western Railway South Wales Main Line, which offered additional benefits. Located on what was a reclaimed marshland, a persistent local legend has it that the resultant dampness often resulted in the area being covered in a light mist or fog, which further protected it from bombing. Even if so, the drainage of the marshes caused the mist to cease. Further acreage was purchased in Brackla, leading to the development of ROF 11 and ROF 41.

In April 1937, the Great Western Railway began constructing the 24 miles (39 km) of internal railway needed to supply the sites. This included a marshalling yard at the main site, sidings at Brackla Ridge, and the construction of Tremains halt near Waterton for worker access. A footbridge was also constructed here, the remnants of which can be seen today. Gee Walker & Slater Ltd, and Sir Lindsay Parkinson & Co. Ltd were the contractors awarded the project to build ROF 53. Sir Robert McAlpine won the contract to build ROF 11 and ROF 41, and the magazine tunnels. In all, the complex consisted of over 1000 buildings, serviced by 60 miles (97 km) of roads.

By 1940, the sites were in full production, with nearly 40,000 people working at the factory, the largest single-site employer in the country.

== Closure ==
ROF Bridgend stopped production in 1945, having been designated a War Duration Only ROF. It remained open as a store until it was closed in 1946, when it was broken up and sold to property developers.

Many of the specialised buildings were simply bulldozed, and like many of the former ROFs it became an industrial estate, now designated as Bridgend Industrial Estate. The administration buildings were taken over after the war to become the Glamorgan County Police Headquarters, which are now the South Wales Police headquarters.

The land between the two former facilities to the south of Brackla Hill, was developed as a large housing complex, now simply called Brackla.

== See also ==
- Royal Ordnance Factory
- Filling Factories
- Royal Ordnance

== Sources ==
- M. J. Clubb (November 2007). The Welsh Arsenal: The Story of the Bridgend Munitions Factory, ROF 53, and the People Who Worked There. Gwasg Blaen-Y-Wawr. ISBN 0-9557615-0-6.
