= Mike Hall (rugby union) =

GB Lions & Wales international rugby union player (born 1965)

- Born: Michael Robert Hall; 13 October 1965 (age 61) Bridgend, Wales
- Height: 6 ft 2 in (1.88 m)
- Weight: 216 lb (98 kg; 15 st 6 lb)
- School: Brynteg Comprehensive
- University: University of Cambridge
- Occupation: Property development

Rugby union career
- Position: Centre
- Current team: Retired
Amateur team(s)
Years	Team	Apps	(Points)
- Cambridge University R.U.F.C.
–	Bridgend RFC		
1989-1999	Cardiff RFC	197	(369)
–	Barbarian F.C.		
International career
Years	Team	Apps	(Points)
1988-1995	Wales	42	(33)
1989	British and Irish Lions	5	(0)

Mike Hall (born 13 October 1965, in Bridgend), is a former Welsh rugby union international, now a property developer and part-time rugby pundit.

Just before graduating from University of Cambridge, Hall commenced his international career on 28 May 1988 against New Zealand in Christchurch aged 22. He made his final appearance on 4 June 1995 in the 24–23 loss against Ireland in Johannesburg in the 1995 Rugby World Cup, where he was captain of the side. In 1989 Hall toured Australia with the Lions and appeared at centre in the first Test.

On graduation, Hall had joined Cardiff-based commercial property surveyors Cooke & Arkwright and qualified as a surveyor in 1991. He left to start his own company Steepholm Property Advisors in 1994. In 2003, he became a director of PMG Developments plc, and in 2006 became involved in the development of a new stadium for Cardiff City F.C.

Hall had a position with the BBC as a rugby pundit on both the Welsh-focused Scrum V, as well at international rugby events, but quit due to business commitments at the end of the 2004–5 season.

In October 2007 Hall left his position on the Cardiff City board after receiving legal advice that informed him that should the club lose its upcoming court case he would be put in an awkward position due to his position at PMG Management, another of the club's major creditors.

On 3 June 2011, Hall re-joined the Cardiff City board after PMG had reached an agreement to turn some of the debt owed by Cardiff City into shares. He would also work with the new Malaysian investors to investigate Sam Hammam's business dealings as the Cardiff City manager.
