= Saint Canna =

6th century female Welsh saint

Canna
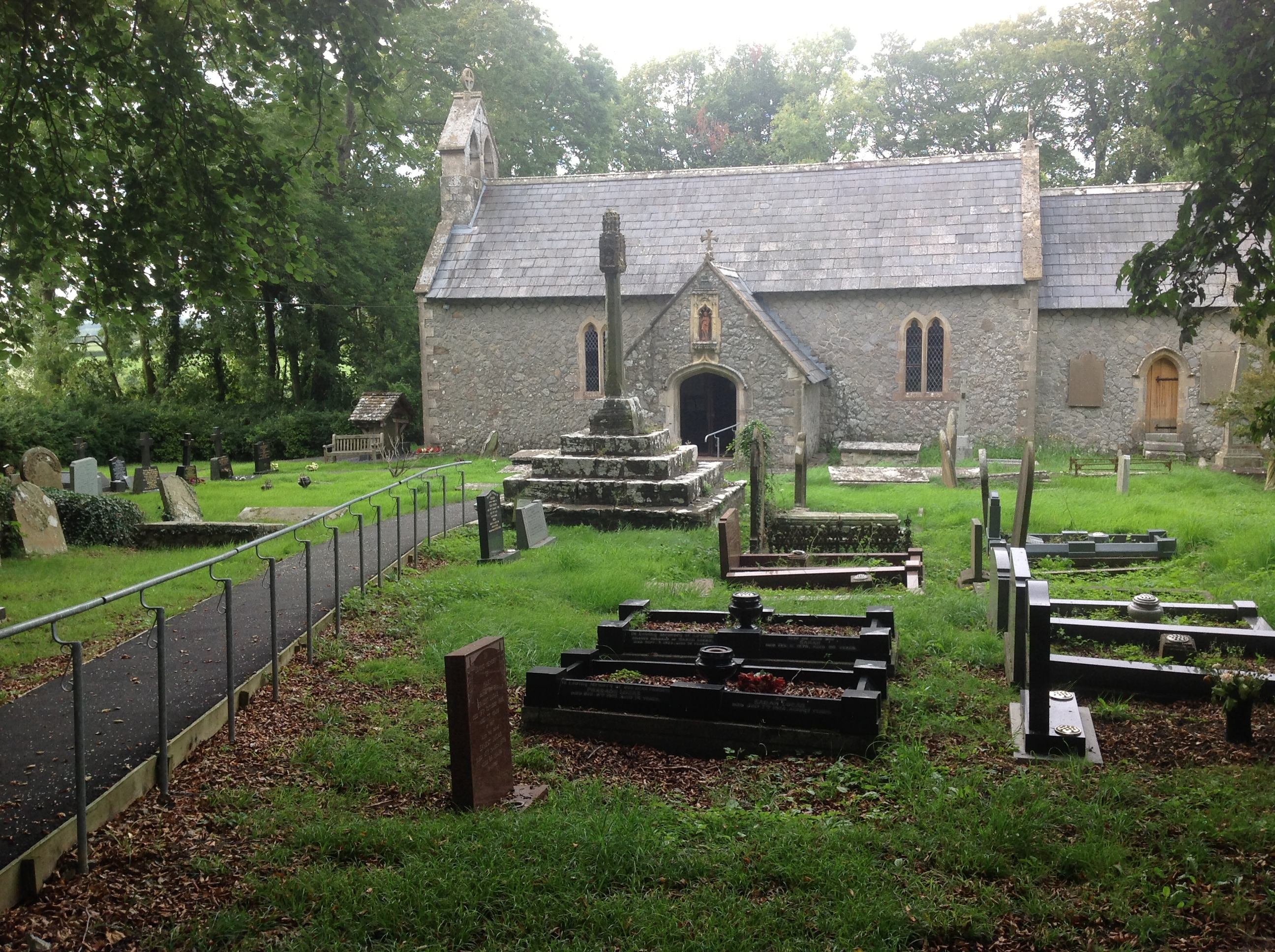
- St Canna's Church, Llangan
- Died: 6th century Wales
- Feast: 25 October

Canna was a sixth-century mother of saints and later a nun in south Wales, to whom two Welsh churches are dedicated.

== Life ==
According to the writings of the unreliable Iolo Morganwg, Canna was a daughter of King Tewdwr Mawr of Armorica (modern-day Brittany) and Cornwall. She was the mother of Crallo and Elian.

Canna was reputedly the sister-in-law and cousin of Illtud, and possibly established the church at Llangan, near Llantwit, due to its proximity to him. She married Sadwrn, her first cousin or uncle; together they accompanied Saint Cadfan to Britain and founded two churches, one in Carmarthenshire and another in Anglesey.

== Veneration ==
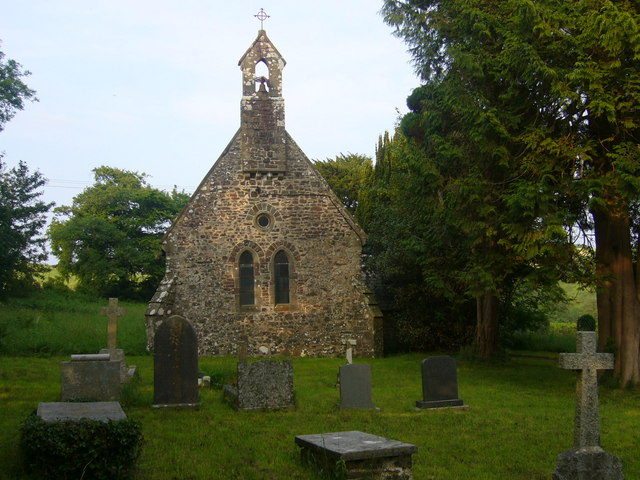
St Canna's Church, Carmarthenshire

At St Canna's Church in Carmarthenshire, there was a holy well below the old church called Ffynnon Ganna, whose water was believed to have curative properties and was a site of pilgrimage for many centuries. The holy well is no longer extant. There was also a stone known as Canna's Chair, with an undated inscription possibly reading CANNA, in a field near the churchyard.

Her name also appears as part of two Cardiff districts: Canton (English translation of the Welsh Treganna, Saint Canna's Town); and Pontcanna (Welsh for Canna's Bridge).

Canna's feast day is celebrated on 25 October.
