= St Crallo's Church =

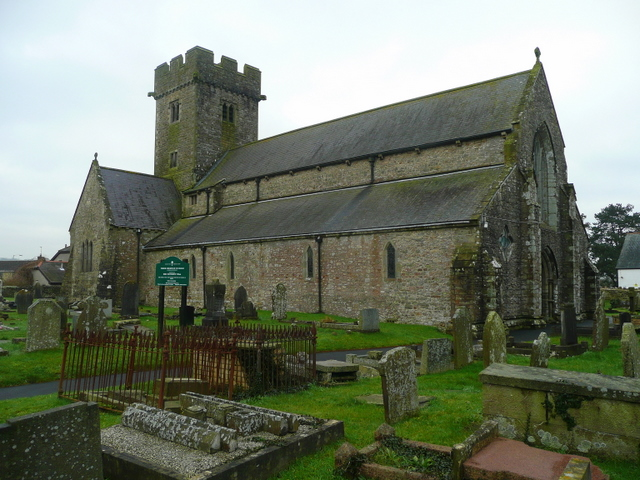
- St Crallo's Church

- Location in Bridgend County Borough
- 51.5062°N 3.5292°W
- Location: Coychurch, Bridgend
- Country: Wales
- Denomination: Church in Wales

History
- Founded: 13th century
- Dedication: Saint Crallo

Architecture
- Heritage designation: Grade I
- Architectural type: Church
- Style: Medieval

St Crallo's Church, often referred to historically as The Cathedral of the Vale of Glamorgan, is a Grade I listed church in Coychurch Lower, Bridgend County Borough, southern Wales.

== History ==
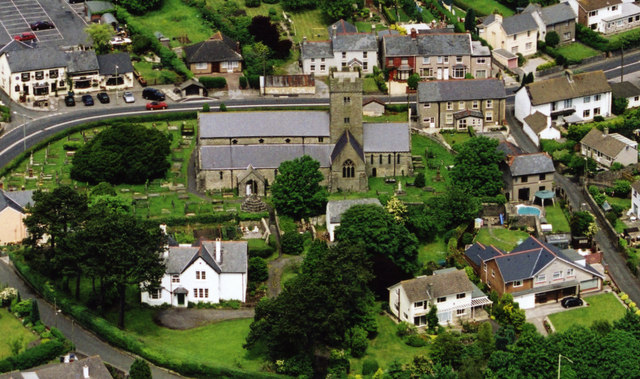
St Crallo's Church

The church is dedicated to the 6th century Celtic saint, Crallo, (Note: The feast of Saint Crallo is August 8.) supposedly related to both Saint Illtyd and Saint Canna. The village in which the church is situated, Coychurch is known in the Welsh language as Llangrallo; Llan – Church, Grallo – Crallo, the church of Crallo. It is believed that the saint founded a church on the site before the construction of the present medieval building.

The present church is dated to the mid to late 13th century, when it was built as part of St Crallo's College. The church had undergone no changes since it was built until John Prichard began a restoration in 1870. At the time of the restoration, no work was done on the tower because it appeared to be sound and there was a lack of funds for further restoration work.

On 7 February 1877, the tower fell without warning. The south transept of the church was in ruins and the northern transept was badly damaged. The tower's collapse also damaged the cross of Saint Crallo in the church courtyard. In 1888, the church hoped to be able to restore the Saint Crallo cross with the help of a drawing made by F. R. Kempson. Fragments of the cross were carefully preserved. The cross was reassembled and is now kept inside the church. At the time the tower fell, a contractor had been removing the remains of those who had been buried near the tower. Some 1,800 remains were being moved to the east side of the church. (Note: Welsh folklore had it that the spirits of the persons whose final resting places were disturbed brought the church tower down. The folklore claimed that the damage to Saint Crallo's cross was proof of the spirits' displeasure.)

Since the nave had relatively little damage, a temporary wall was built at its east end to allow the church to conduct services. It remained in this condition until the church was able to fund the rebuilding project. F. R. Kempson was given the responsibility of the rebuilding work in 1888. The stained glass windows of the aisle were installed by Celtic Studios in the mid 20th century, while the western windows of engraved glass were added by Frank Roper in 1963.

== Architecture ==
Newman describes the St Crallo's as 'large and impressive' while E. A. Freeman, writing in 1857, suggested that the building would make 'an admirable model for small colonial church'. Built in the mid to late 13th century St Crallo's is cruciform in design.

The church contains a memorial to lexicographer Thomas Richards, a 14th-century tomb chest featuring an effigy of praying monk with fine detail on a plain tomb chest, and an 18th-century memento mori tablet on the western wall dedicated to Richard Howell. St Crallo's Church became a Grade I listed building on 26 July 1963. In the churchyard is Coychurch Celtic Cross-Shaft, which is a Scheduled Monument.

== Bibliography ==
- Glynne, Stephen Richard (1888). "Notes on the older churches in the four Welsh Dioceses". Archaeologia Cambrensis. W. Pickering. hdl:2027/mdp.39015065744024.
- Jones, David Daven (1910). The early Cymry and their church. W. Spurrell. hdl:2027/uc1.$b286541.
- Morgan, Thomas (1912). The place-names of Wales. J. E. Southall. hdl:2027/hvd.32044017961624.
- Newman, John (1995). Glamorgan. London: Penguin Group. ISBN 0140710566.
- Royal Commission on the Ancient and Historical Monuments of Wales (1975). An Inventory of the Ancient Monuments in Glamorgan: Pre-Norman. pt. 1. The Stone and Bronze Ages. pt. 2. The Iron Age and the Roman occupation. pt. 3. The early Christian period. Royal Commission on the Ancient and Historical Monuments of Wales. ISBN 978-0-1170-0590-7.
- Sikes, Wirt (1880). British Goblins: Welsh Folk-lore, Fairy Mythology, Legends and Traditions. S. Low, Marston, Searle & Rivington. p. 387. "St Crallo's Church."
