= Coychurch =

Coordinates: 51.498395°N 3.528979°W

Coychurch: Welsh: Llangrallo
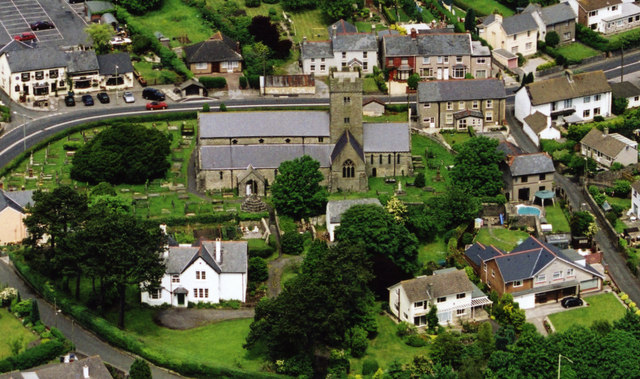
- St.Crallo's Church, Coychurch

- Location within Bridgend
- OS grid reference: SS939788
- Community: Coychurch Lower
- Principal area: Bridgend
- Preserved county: Mid Glamorgan
- Country: Wales
- Sovereign state: United Kingdom
- Post town: BRIDGEND
- Postcode district: CF31
- Dialling code: 01656
- Police: South Wales
- Fire: South Wales
- Ambulance: Welsh
- UK Parliament: Bridgend
- Senedd Cymru – Welsh Parliament: Bridgend

Coychurch (Welsh: Llangrallo) is a small village that sits between Pencoed and Bridgend in Wales, bordering with Bridgend Industrial Estate, where many residents are employed. It is part of the community of Coychurch Lower.

== History ==
The village has a long-standing religious association, with an early Christian church having been built there possibly as long ago as the 8th century CE. The current church of St Crallo was built in the 13th century, and is a Grade I listed building, very large in size for the village it serves. A medieval cross in the churchyard, close to the church's south door, is Grade II* listed. John Wesley is said to have included the church in his preaching tour of 1771, and the churchyard also contains the grave of the lexicographer Thomas Richards (1710–1790), perpetual curate of Llangrallo, who published the first full-length English-Welsh dictionary in 1753 and dedicated it to Frederick, Prince of Wales.

Near the church are two public houses, the White Horse and the Prince of Wales. The only other businesses in the village are a hairdressing salon and a general store. Coychurch (Llangrallo) Primary School is located in Main Road and is an English-medium school and had 106 pupils as at 2014.

In 2013, extensive improvements were made to road safety within the village. A crossing was placed outside the school and pavements were improved; this resulted in fewer pupils being brought to school by car, with a consequent reduction in traffic through the village.

A local Arthurian legend has grown up, fostered by amateur historian Alan Wilson, who claims, in his 1986 book Artorius Rex Discovered, to have discovered a cave in Coed-y-Mwstwr Forest, just behind the village of Coychurch, where King Arthur was buried secretly, for fear that the news of his death might split his kingdom. Some believe that the Holy Grail was brought to the area by Joseph of Arimathea. A manuscript owned by "Thomas Hopkin of Coychurch" was used by the antiquary Iolo Morganwg to provide "genealogies" of the British saints and a pedigree of Taliesin.

The Coed-y-Mwstwr Hotel, named after the wood, is a Grade II listed building and the former home of MP Arthur John Williams and his wife Rose (the daughter of Robert Thompson and Rose Mary Crawshay). Their many guests at the house included David Lloyd George and Ivor Novello. Following Arthur Williams' death, his wife Rose financed the building of the Williams Memorial Hall in 1920, creating a trust that is now administered by Coychurch Lower Community Council.

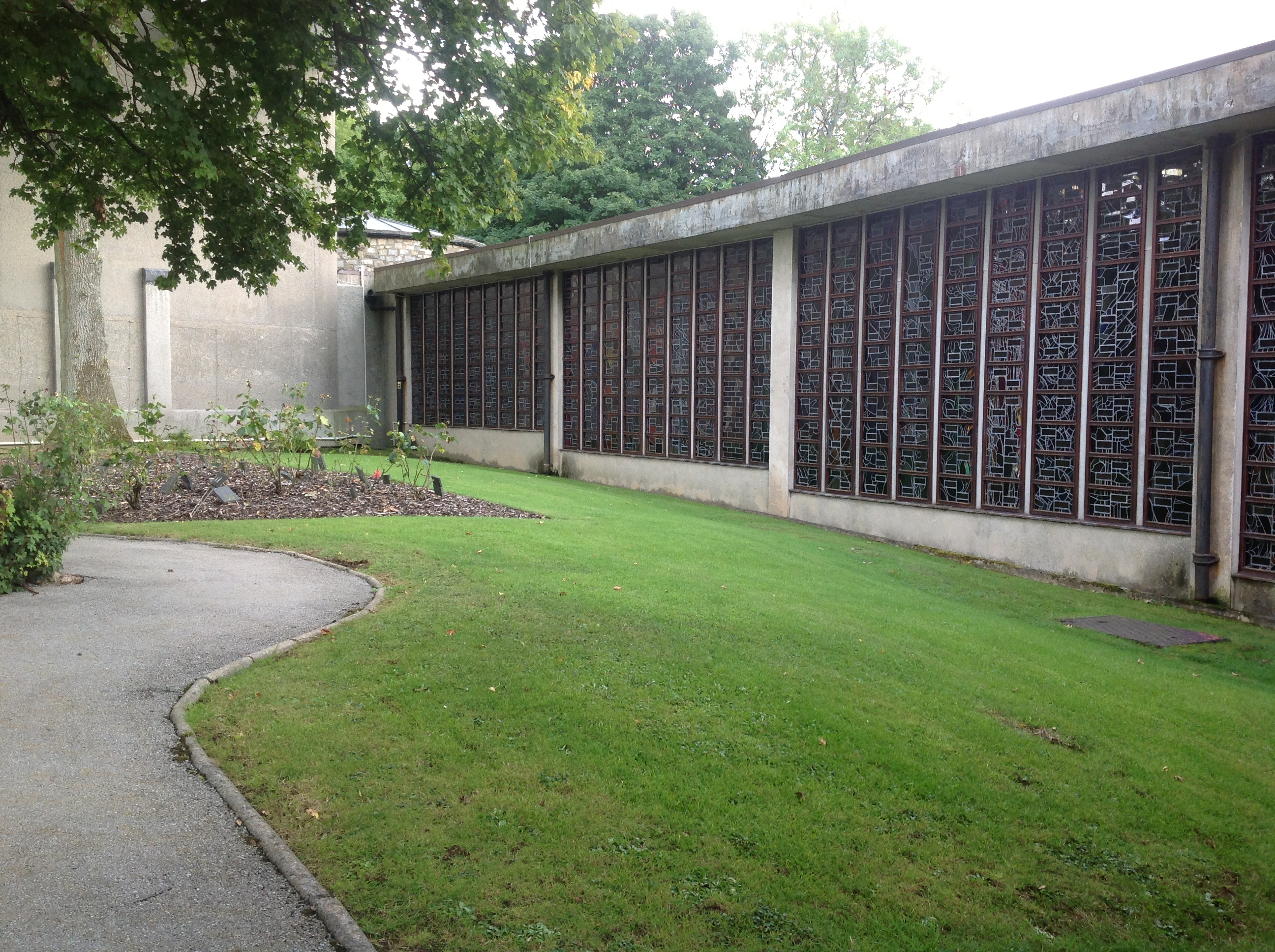
Capel Crallo, Coychurch Crematorium

The crematorium, which serves the Bridgend area, was built in 1970 and was the last design of modernist architect Maxwell Fry, with stained-glass windows produced by Swansea School of Art. It became a Grade II* listed building in 2001. It is administered by Bridgend County Borough Council.
