= Bridgend Industrial Estate =

Coordinates: 51°29′59″N 3°33′10″W

Bridgend Industrial Estate is a large industrial park complex in Bridgend, Wales.

It is made up of three adjoining Industrial Estates, being Waterton, Bridgend, and North Road and incorporating a retail park in Waterton.

It was built on the site of the former ROF Bridgend, on which South Wales Police Headquarters also stands.

Bridgend Industrial Estate is inhabited (amongst others) by such companies as Ford, though other large companies such as Sony have recently moved out of the estate. It is also occupied by a number of smaller firms.

On 19 January 2024 at around 20:00 GMT, a large fire broke out in the area of the industrial estate at Formaction Limited.
