= Pontyclun railway station =

Railway station in Rhonda Cynon Taff, Wales

Pontyclun Welsh: Pont-y-clun
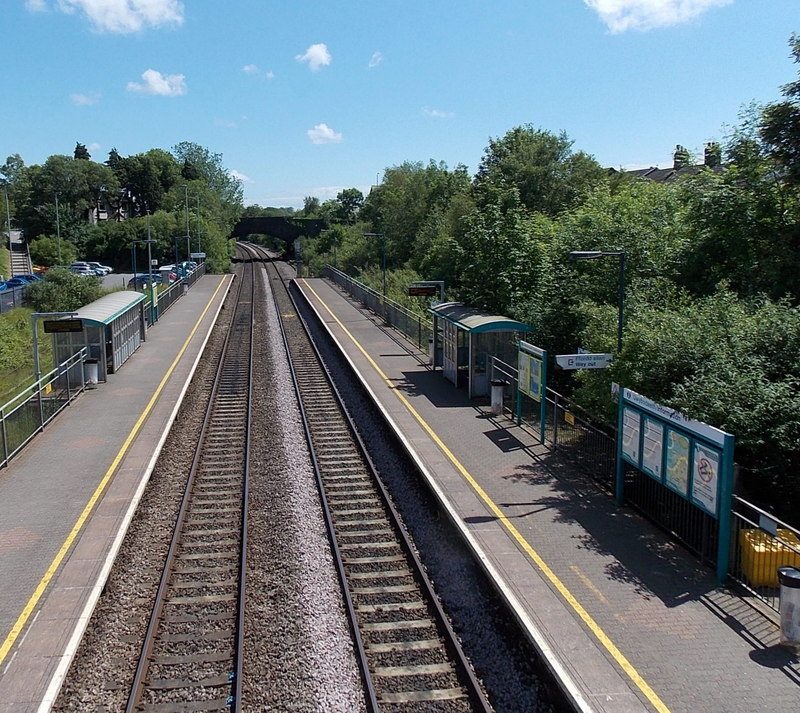
- Pontyclun Railway Station, June 2014

General information
- Location: Pontyclun, Rhondda Cynon Taf; Wales
- Coordinates: 51.5239°N 3.3921°W
- Grid reference: ST035815
- Managed by: Transport for Wales Rail
- Platforms: 2

Other information
- Station code: PYC
- Classification: DfT category F2

History
- Original company: South Wales Railway / Cowbridge Railway
- Pre-grouping: Great Western Railway / Taff Vale Railway
- Post-grouping: Great Western Railway

Key dates
- 18 June 1850: SWR station opened as Llantrissant for Cowbridge
- 18 September 1865: Cowbridge Rly station opened as Llantrissant
- c. 1866: GWR (ex-SWR) station renamed Llantrissant
- by 1902: both stations renamed Llantrisant
- 21 September 1925: Stations amalgamated
- 2 November 1964: Closed
- 28 September 1992: Reopened as Pontyclun

Passengers
- 2020/21: ▼41,636
- 2021/22: ▲0.155 million
- 2022/23: ▲0.211 million
- 2023/24: ▲0.256 million
- 2024/25: ▲0.278 million
Location
Notes
- Passenger statistics from the Office of Rail and Road

Pontyclun railway station is an unstaffed, minor railway station in Pontyclun, in the County Borough of Rhondda Cynon Taf, South Wales. The station is at street level, on Station Approach, Pontyclun. It is a stop on the South Wales Main Line, served by trains on the Maesteg Line, and occasionally by the Swanline Cardiff to Swansea regional services, as well as one early-morning daily service to Manchester and a late-night daily service to Carmarthen. The station and all trains are operated by Transport for Wales Rail. It is 181 miles 40 chains (292.1 km) from the zero point at London Paddington, measured via Stroud.

The station was rebuilt and reopened under British Rail as Pontyclun on 28 September 1992. It was previously called Llantrisant station and was originally two separate railway stations that were merged in 1925, those originally belonging to the South Wales Railway and the Cowbridge Railway, whose successors, the Great Western Railway and the Taff Vale Railway respectively, had amalgamated in 1922.

== History ==
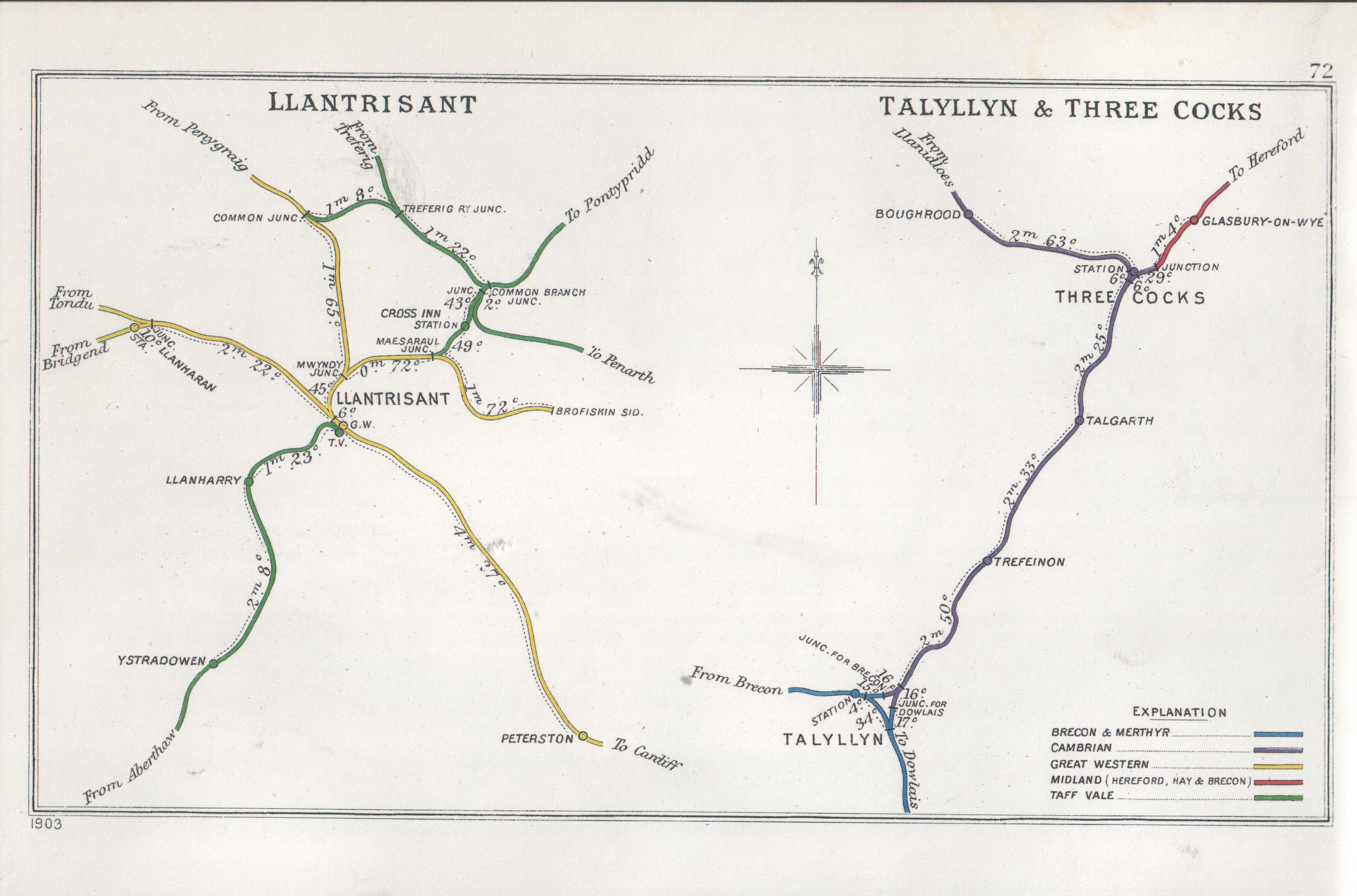
A 1903 Railway Clearing House junction diagram showing (left) railways in the vicinity of Pontyclun (shown here as Llantrisant). GWR in yellow; TVR in green.

The first section of the South Wales Railway (SWR), that between Chepstow and Swansea, opened on 18 June 1850. The original stations on that line included one named Llantrissant for Cowbridge.

The station became a junction with the opening of the first section of the Ely Valley Railway (EVR) to Tonyrefail on 2 August 1860, although passenger services along that line did not begin until 1 August 1865. The EVR opened a branch to Brofiskin Colliery in 1862, and another railway, the Llantrisant and Taff Vale Junction Railway, which opened in December 1863, intended to use part of that branch to gain access to Llantrisant via a connection at Maesaraul Junction, but in order to do this, the Brofiskin branch had to be altered to mixed gauge – this occurred in December 1864.

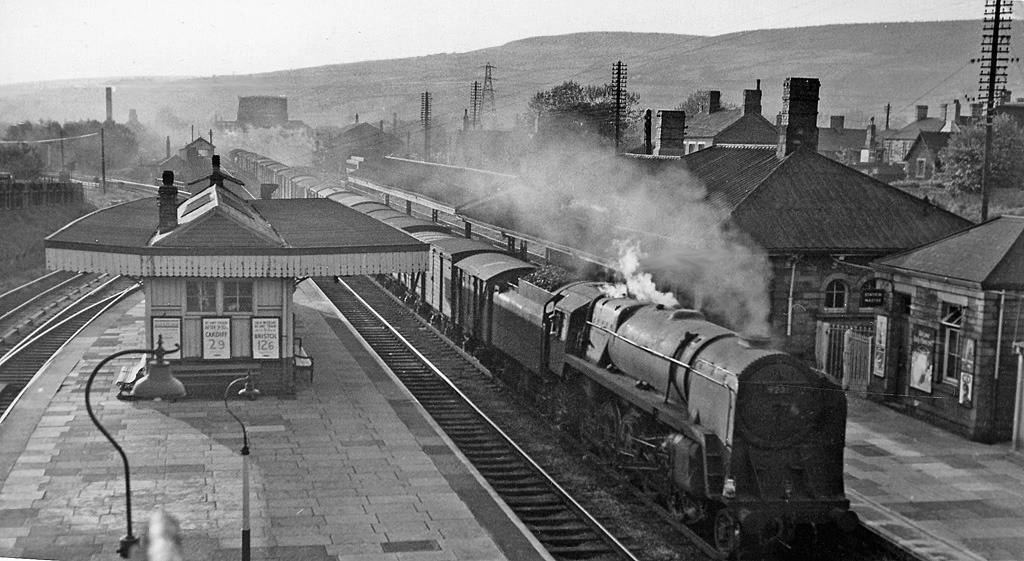
The former Llantrisant station in 1962

The station name was simplified to Llantrissant c. 1866, by which time the SWR had amalgamated with the Great Western Railway (GWR) in 1863. Adjacent to this station was the terminus of the Cowbridge Railway, which opened on 18 September 1865, originally being named Llantrissant. The Cowbridge Railway was leased by the Taff Vale Railway (TVR) in 1876, and absorbed by that concern in 1889. Both the GWR and TVR stations had their names amended to Llantrisant by 1902. The TVR in its turn amalgamated with the GWR on 1 January 1922, and on 21 September 1925 their respective stations were merged as a single station.

Llantrisant was a major intermediate station on the South Wales Main Line. It consisted of two central through platforms and bays for the Ely Valley line, the Llantrisant & Taff Vale Junction line and the branch to Cowbridge and Aberthaw. The station was closed on 2 November 1964. Under the auspices of Regional Railways sector of British Rail and Mid Glamorgan the station was reopened. The station was rebuilt and reopened as Pontyclun on 28 September 1992.

Extensive sidings existed around the station for the coal and mineral traffic generated by the mines in the area. At least the line to Cwm Colliery was in regular use until 1984.

=== Cwm Colliery branch line ===
A single track railway runs north from Pontyclun station - the remnants of the Llantrisant and Taff Vale Junction Railway. The track turns east at Talbot Green to run roughly parallel to the Afon Clun, alongside the north of the A473, which runs between Pontypridd and Bridgend. At Cross Inn the track turns north east, running south of Llantrisant and north of Caerau Hillfort, an Iron Age enclosure. Originally, it ran to the Cwm Coking Works at Tynant, Beddau, just past the former station Llantwit Fardre, although the track has been totally dismantled and the trackbed is now a cycle path that currently terminates at Westfield Crescent, Cross Inn. None of the original railway paraphernalia remains intact between Talbot Green and Pontyclun, apart from a footbridge with cages above the former track (to prevent people throwing things (or themselves) onto the trains, tracks or coal wagons) that crosses the A473 where it meets the A4222 near Leekes. The track remains embedded in the road where it crosses the A473, and warning lights were at the roadside and road signs warned drivers to stop if they saw warning lights flash at the level crossing but these were removed during construction of the cycle path. A consultative study in 2006 (Sewta Rail Strategy Study) considered the possibility of reopening the Pontyclun to Beddau branch line, as a passenger line rather than just for freight. This would require new stations at Talbot Green, Llantrisant, Gwaun Meisgyn and Beddau (Tynant).

=== Llantrisant locomotive depot ===
A locomotive depot, known as Llantrisant, was situated between the station and Mwyndy Junction, on the eastern side of the curve. It housed around 20 locomotives, and closed in October 1964.

== Facilities ==
Pontyclun station is unstaffed. It has neither ticket gates nor barriers. The station has no ticket office. passengers can purchase tickets from the station platform self-service ticket machine, on board trains or at their destination. Both platforms have shelters. The station car park is free-of-charge to rail users.

== Platform layout ==
The station has 2 platforms:

- Platform 1, for westbound trains towards Maesteg;
- Platform 2, for eastbound trains towards Cardiff.

== Services ==
Mondays to Saturdays there is an hourly service eastbound to Cardiff Central, with most continuing to Newport, Chepstow, Lydney, Gloucester and Cheltenham Spa, as well as an early-morning service to Manchester via Cardiff, Newport and the Welsh Marches Line via Hereford, Shrewsbury and Crewe. Westbound, services continue to Bridgend and Maesteg. These services are operated mainly by Class 170 Turbostar units.

On Sundays the service decreases slightly. There is roughly a 2-hourly service to Maesteg however there are also four services a day to Manchester Piccadilly via Hereford and Shrewsbury, the latter of which is usually operated by either Class 158 Express Sprinter or Class 175 Coradia units.

A few early morning and late evening services take the spur to Ninian Park to continue onto Cardiff Central alongside Canton sidings, to retain route knowledge.

Preceding station	National Rail	Following station
Cardiff Central	Transport for Wales; Maesteg Line	Llanharan
Ninian Park limited service	Transport for Wales; Maesteg Line	Llanharan
Cardiff Central	Transport for Wales; South Wales Main Line	Pencoed
	Disused railways	
Terminus	Great Western Railway; Ely Valley Railway	Coed Ely; Line and station closed
Terminus	Llantrisant and Taff Vale Junction Railway; Pontypridd-Llantrisant	Cross Inn; Line and station closed
Terminus	Taff Vale Railway; Llantrisant-Aberthaw	Llanharry; Line and station closed
	Historical railways	
Peterston; Line open, station closed	Great Western Railway; South Wales Main Line	Llanharan; Line and station open
