= Llanharan railway station =

Railway station in Rhondda Cynon Taf, Wales

Llanharan
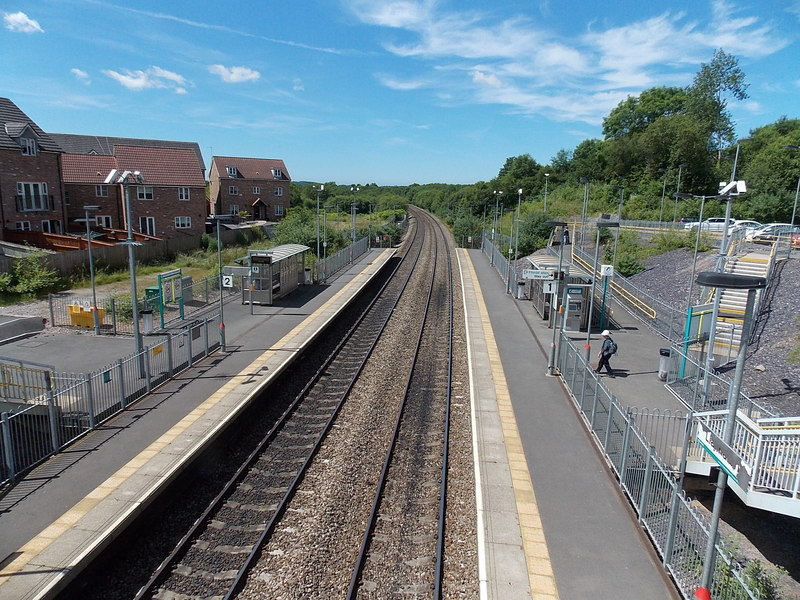
- Llanharan railway station from footbridge

General information
- Location: Llanharan, Rhondda Cynon Taf; Wales
- Coordinates: 51.538°N 3.441°W
- Grid reference: ST001830
- Managed by: Transport for Wales Rail
- Platforms: 2

Other information
- Station code: LLR
- Classification: DfT category F2

History
- Original company: South Wales Railway
- Pre-grouping: Great Western Railway

Key dates
- 1850: Opened
- 2 November 1964: Closed
- 10 December 2007: Reopened

Passengers
- 2020/21: ▼23,652
- 2021/22: ▲76,922
- 2022/23: ▲0.106 million
- 2023/24: ▲0.117 million
- 2024/25: ▲0.125 million
Location
Notes
- Passenger statistics from the Office of Rail and Road

Llanharan railway station serves the village of Llanharan in south Wales. Funded in part by SEWTA and at a cost of £4.3 million, it opened in December 2007. It is 183 miles 72 chains (296.0 km) from the zero point at London Paddington, measured via Stroud.

== History ==
A former station was on the site until 1964, when it was closed under the Beeching Cuts. Following local campaigning from residents with backing from the MP and AM. EC funding was secured and a new station was agreed and work began in 2007.

== Facilities ==
The station has two platforms connected by a footbridge and small shelters for passengers. It is unstaffed but features CCTV and help points. A car park is next to the station.

The approved design features Corus Modular Platforms. The Modular Platform was selected as the majority of the structure can be erected with trains still running. Alternative forms of construction would have required extended blockage of the line (with associated disruption to through services on the South Wales Main Line).

The principal contractor for construction was Galliford Try Water & Rail, utilising local subcontractors where possible.

== Services ==
The station has an hourly service westbound to Bridgend and Maesteg and eastbound towards Cardiff Central, with some services continuing on towards Newport, Chepstow, Gloucester and Cheltenham Spa. These services are operated mainly by Class 170 Turbostar units.

On Sundays the service decreases slightly. There is roughly a 2-hourly service to Maesteg however there are also four services a day to Manchester Piccadilly via Hereford and Shrewsbury, the latter of which is usually operated by either Class 158 Express Sprinter or Class 175 Coradia units.

A few early morning and late evening services take the spur to Ninian Park to continue onto Cardiff Central alongside Canton sidings, to retain route knowledge.

Preceding station	National Rail	Following station
Pontyclun	Transport for Wales; Maesteg Line	Pencoed
