= Litchard =

Suburb in Bridgend County Borough

Coordinates: 51.525°N 3.575°W

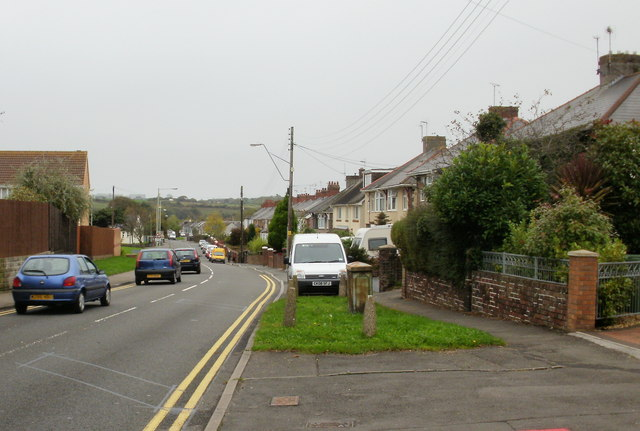
Litchard Terrace

Litchard (Welsh: Llidiard) is a village and residential district north of Bridgend, Wales. It is also an electoral ward in the Coity Higher community, as well as a former ward to Bridgend County Borough Council.

== Description ==
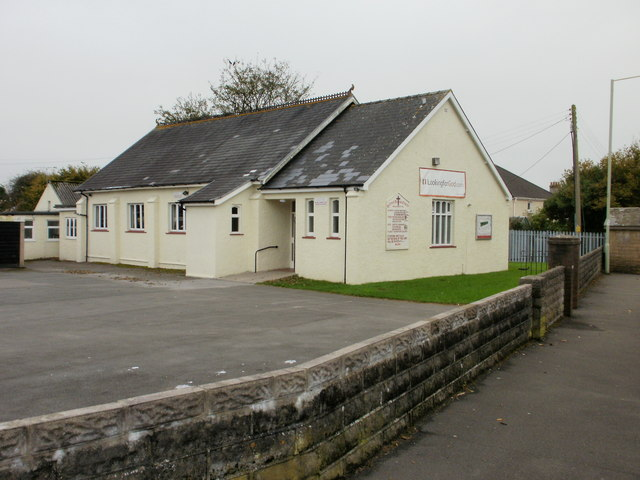
Litchard Mission Church

The village of Coity lies to the east, Pendre to the south, Wildmill and the River Ogmore to the west. Litchard is described as being in top 10% of most privileged areas of Wales, according to the Welsh Index of Multiple Deprivation, with many of its houses privately owned.

According to the 2011 UK Census, the population of the Litchard ward was 2,147.

The village has playing fields, a primary school and a mission church. Wildmill railway station is located at the bottom of Litchard Terrace.

== Electoral ward ==
=== Mid Glamorgan County Council ===
Litchard was created as a ward to Mid Glamorgan County Council, by The County of Mid Glamorgan (Electoral Arrangements) Order 1988, taking effect from the 1989 elections. It elected a Labour county councillor at the 1989 and 1993 elections.

=== Bridgend County Borough Council ===
Litchard subsequently became an electoral ward to Bridgend County Borough Council, effective from the 1999 elections. A Labour councillor was elected in 1999. In 2004 Conservative, Don Brett, was elected. He left the Conservatives and was elected as an Independent in 2008. In 2012 the ward returned to Labour.

Following a 2019 local government boundary review, the wards of Coity, Litchard and Pendre were combined to form a Coity Higher ward, effective from the 2022 local elections. The Coity Higher ward elects three county borough councillors.

=== Coity Higher Community Council ===
Coity Higher elects a community council and Litchard is one of the three community wards to Coity Higher Community Council. In 2022 the community council increased in size but, to balance the representation between the three wards, the number of councillors elected from Litchard was reduced from five, to four.

== See also ==
- List of electoral wards in Bridgend County Borough
