= Pencoed railway station =

Railway station in Bridgend, Wales

Pencoed
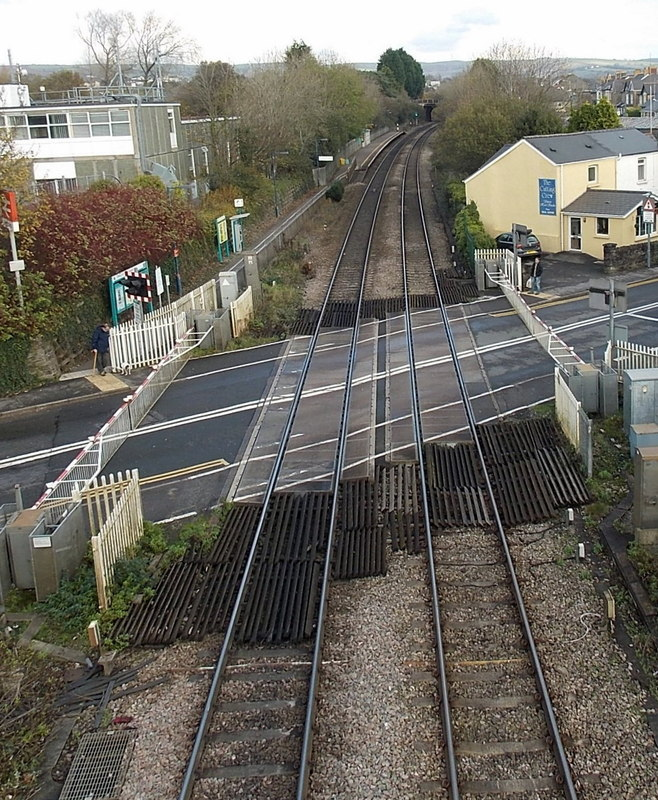

General information
- Location: Pencoed, Bridgend; Wales
- Coordinates: 51.5233°N 3.5022°W
- Grid reference: SS958815
- Manager: Transport for Wales Rail
- Platforms: 2

Other information
- Station code: PCD
- Classification: DfT category F2

History
- Opened: 19 June 1850; 176 years ago
- Closed: 2 November 1964; 62 years ago
- Original company: South Wales Railway
- Pre-grouping: Great Western Railway
- Post-grouping: Great Western Railway

Key dates
- 11 May 1992: Reopened

Passengers
- 2020/21: ▼44,862
- 2021/22: ▲0.126 million
- 2022/23: ▲0.153 million
- 2023/24: ▲0.213 million
- 2024/25: ▲0.232 million
Location
Notes
- Passenger statistics from the Office of Rail and Road

Pencoed railway station is a minor station in Pencoed, Bridgend County Borough, south Wales. The station is located at street level at The Square in Pencoed.

It is a stop on the South Wales Main Line, served by trains on the Maesteg Line, and occasionally by Swanline Cardiff to Swansea regional services, as well as the peak time Manchester to Carmarthen service. All trains are operated by Transport for Wales Rail.

== History ==
The present station was one of two reopened between Cardiff and Bridgend by British Rail in September 1992 as part of the Maesteg Line reinstatement scheme, the previous station here having succumbed to the Beeching Axe in November 1964 (along with many other smaller stations on the Cardiff to Swansea main line).

== Facilities ==
The station has 2 platforms:

- Platform 1, for westbound trains towards Swansea
- Platform 2, for eastbound trains towards Cardiff

The station is unstaffed - there is no ticket office nor are there any platform entry barriers. Passengers must purchase tickets on board trains or from a self-service ticket machine near the station entrance on platform 2. The two platforms are offset from each other, with platform 2 (Cardiff-bound) to the east of the level crossing that bisects the site and platform 1 (West Wales) to the west of it. Each platform has a waiting shelter, CIS display, and timetable posters, whilst there is also a customer help point at the entrance to platform 1. Though the station footbridge has steps, level access to both sides is possible via the road crossing.

Platform 2 can accommodate a five-coach train and is 186 miles 49 chains (300.3 km) from the zero point at London Paddington, measured via Stroud; the level crossing is at 186 miles 55 chains (300.4 km); whilst platform 1 can accommodate a four-coach train and is at 186 miles 60 chains (300.5 km).

== Incidents ==
In June 2008, a 16-year-old girl Sophie Harris was struck by a train and killed. Harris had been drinking.

== Services ==
The station has an hourly service westbound to Bridgend and Maesteg and eastbound towards Cardiff Central, with some services continuing on towards Newport, Chepstow, Gloucester and Cheltenham Spa. These services are operated mainly by Class 170 Turbostar units.

On Sundays the service decreases slightly. There is roughly a 2-hourly service to Maesteg however there are also four services a day to Manchester Piccadilly via Hereford and Shrewsbury, the latter of which is usually operated by either Class 158 Express Sprinter or Class 175 Coradia units.

A few early morning and late evening services take the spur to Ninian Park to continue onto Cardiff Central alongside Canton sidings, to retain route knowledge.

Preceding station	National Rail	Following station
Llanharan	Transport for Wales; Maesteg Line	Bridgend
Pontyclun	Transport for Wales; South Wales Main Line	Bridgend
