= Sarn railway station =

Railway station in Bridgend, Wales

Sarn
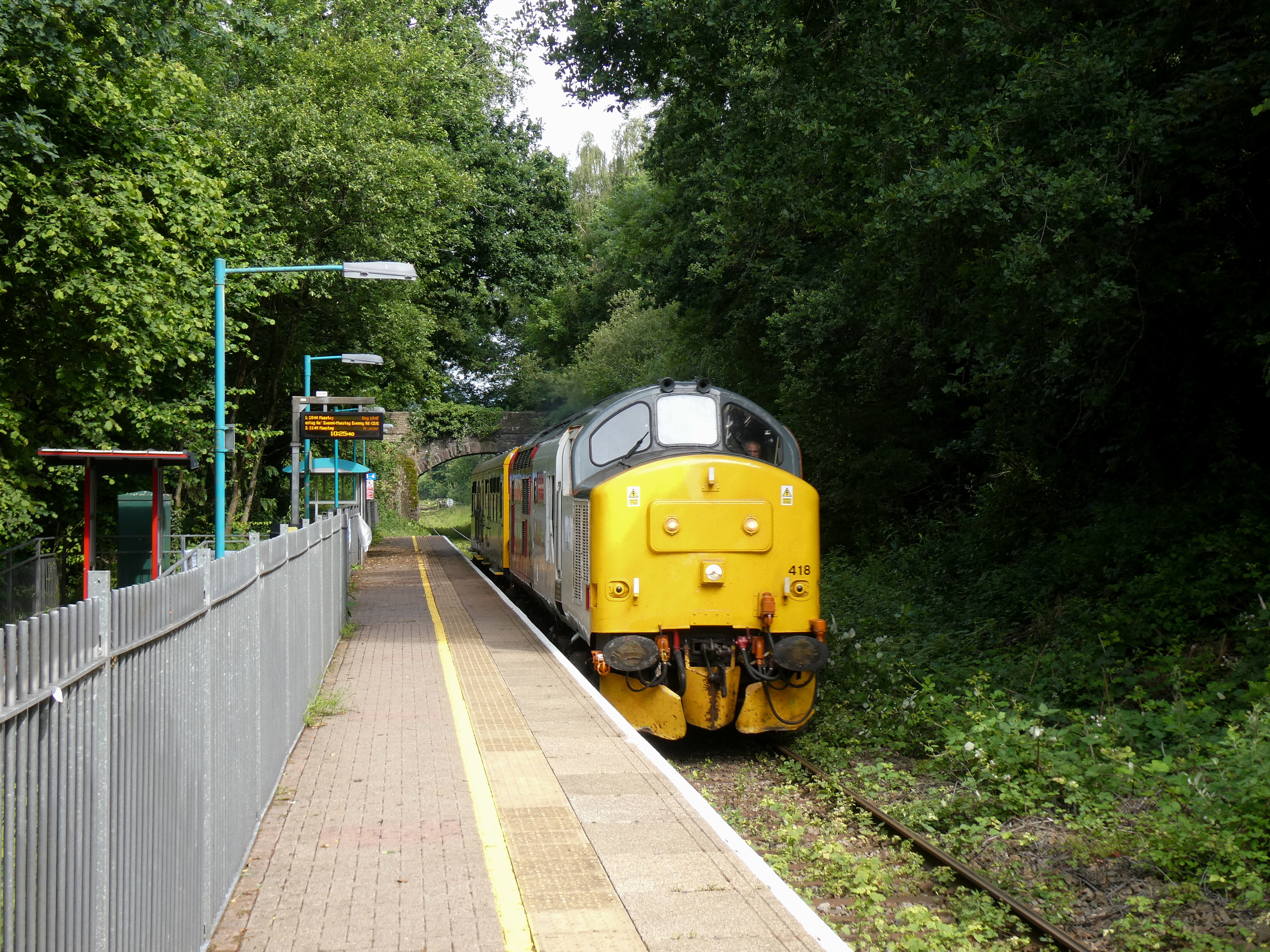

General information
- Location: Sarn, Bridgend; Wales
- Coordinates: 51.5388°N 3.5898°W
- Grid reference: SS898834
- Manager: Transport for Wales
- Platforms: 1

Other information
- Station code: SRR
- Classification: DfT category F2

History
- Original company: British Rail

Key dates
- 28 September 1992: Station opened

Passengers
- 2021/22: ▲33,834
- 2022/23: ▲46,410
- 2023/24: ▲53,102
- 2024/25: ▲56,976
- 2025/26: ▲60,820
Location
Notes
- Passenger statistics from the Office of Rail and Road

Sarn railway station is a railway station serving the village of Sarn, South Wales. It is located on the Maesteg Line from Cardiff via Bridgend.

The station was opened by British Rail on 28 September 1992.

Passenger services are operated by Transport for Wales as part of the Valley Lines network for local services.

Preceding station	National Rail	Following station
Wildmill	Transport for Wales; Maesteg Line	Tondu
