= Cross Inn railway station =

Former railway station in Wales

Cross Inn
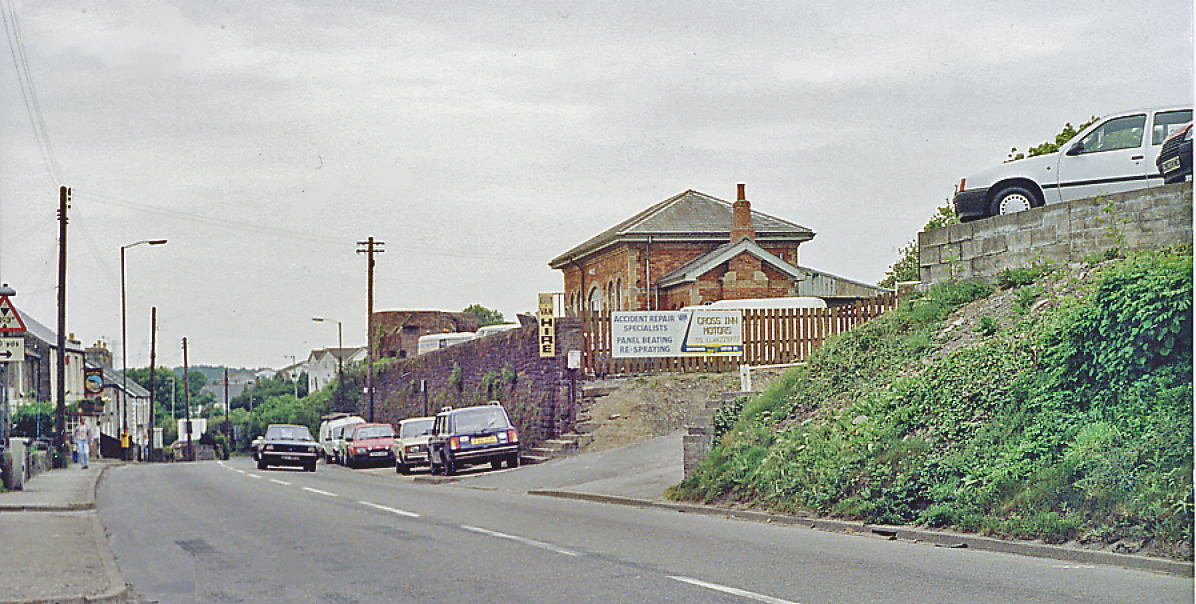
- Remains of the station in 1990

General information
- Location: Llantrisant, Rhondda Cynon Taf; Wales
- Coordinates: 51.5393°N 3.3633°W
- Grid reference: ST055831
- Platforms: 1

Other information
- Status: Disused

History
- Original company: Llantrisant and Taff Vale Junction Railway
- Pre-grouping: Taff Vale Railway
- Post-grouping: Great Western Railway

Key dates
- 21 January 1875: Station opened
- 31 March 1952: Station closed
Location

Cross Inn railway station was situated on the line between Treforest and Llantrisant, Wales, about half a mile (0.8 km) to the east of Llantrisant village. Typically for this line, the station had a single passenger platform a few goods sidings.

== Today ==
The platform and buildings still exist – although now in private use - alongside the mothballed Pontyclun to Cwm Colliery line over which trains ran regularly until 1984.

Preceding station	Disused railways	Following station
Beddau Halt; Line and station closed	Llantrisant and Taff Vale Junction Railway; Pontypridd-Llantrisant	Llantrisant; Line closed, station open
