= Wildmill railway station =

Railway station in South Wales

Wildmill Welsh: Y Felin Wyllt
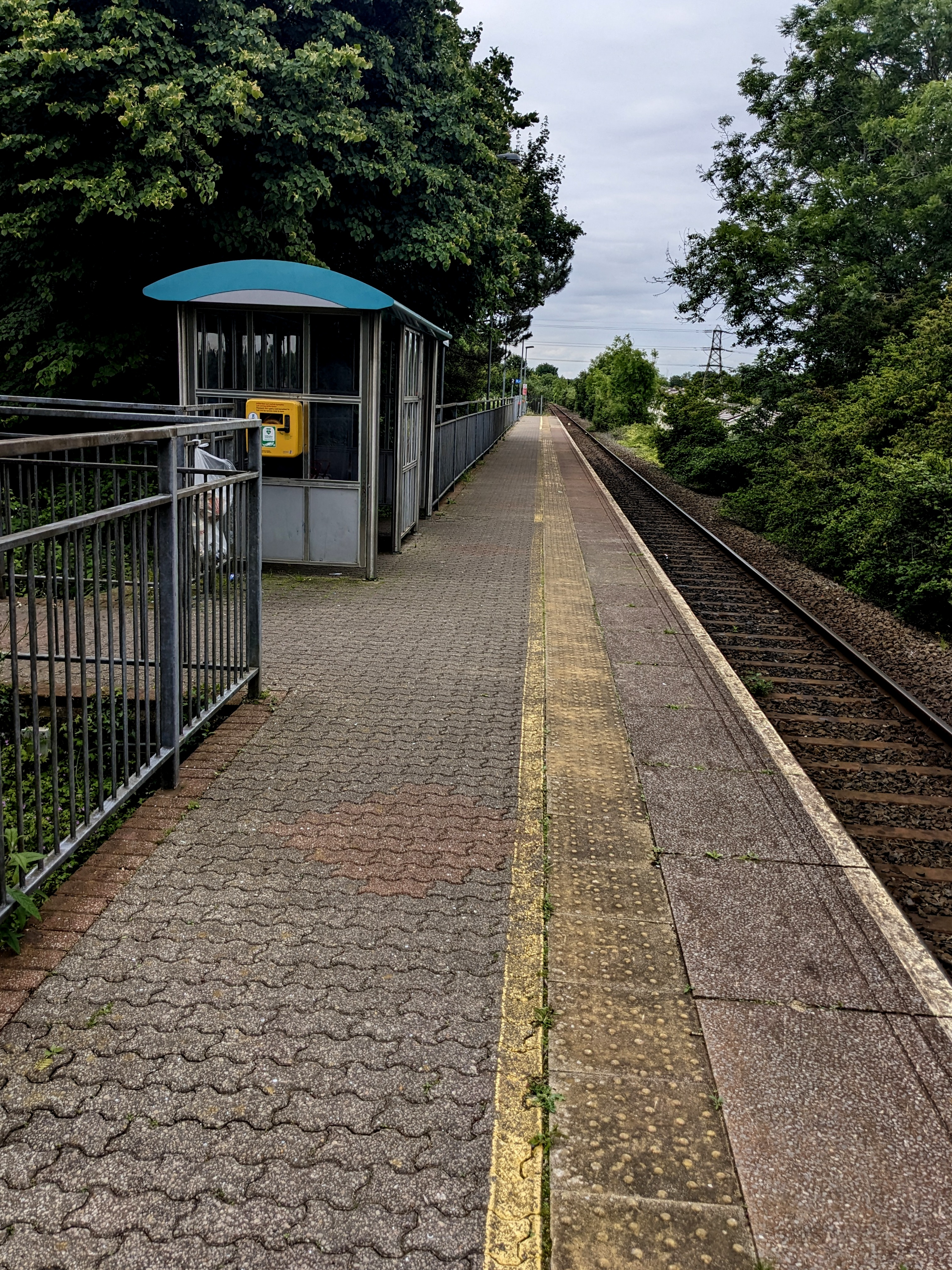

General information
- Location: Bridgend, Bridgend; Wales
- Coordinates: 51.5199°N 3.5803°W
- Grid reference: SS904812
- Manager: Transport for Wales Rail
- Platforms: 1

Other information
- Station code: WMI
- Classification: DfT category F2

History
- Original company: British Rail

Key dates
- 16 November 1992: Opened
- 16 November 1992: Closed
- 12 December 1992: Reopened

Passengers
- 2021/22: ▲15,258
- 2022/23: ▲23,648
- 2023/24: ▲31,566
- 2024/25: ▼28,878
- 2025/26: ▲33,048
Location
Notes
- Passenger statistics from the Office of Rail and Road

Wildmill railway station is a railway station serving the district of Wildmill, Bridgend, South Wales. It is located on the Maesteg Line from Cardiff via Bridgend.

== History ==
The railway line between Bridgend and Maesteg had been in operation since 1866, but closed to passenger trains in 1970. Following campaigning in the 1980s and 1990s, the line reopened in 1992, with new stations in Wildmill, Sarn, Tondu, and Garth, as well as two in Maesteg (Ewenny Road and Castle Street). The cost of the new stations were funded by the Mid Glamorgan County Council. Services began running to Maesteg in September, and the line was officially opened in October by Prince Richard, Duke of Gloucester.

Wildmill station was one of the later stations to be opened, and initially operated on a trial basis to gauge demand. The initial opening by British Rail took place on 16 November, but the station had to be closed after just a few hours, due to the station shelter being one inch too close to the platform edge. Health and Safety Executive officers also demanded changes to the overhang on the shelter roof, which was five inches too near to the end of the platform. It was reopened nearly four weeks later, on 12 December 1992.

== Service ==
Passenger services are operated by Transport for Wales Rail as part of the Valley Lines network for local services.

Preceding station	National Rail	Following station
Bridgend	Transport for Wales; Maesteg Line	Sarn
