= Beddau Halt railway station =

Railway station in Rhondda Cynon Taf, Wales, UK

Beddau Halt

General information
- Location: Beddau, Rhondda Cynon Taf; Wales
- Coordinates: 51.5476°N 3.3476°W
- Grid reference: ST066840
- Platforms: 1

Other information
- Status: Disused

History
- Original company: Taff Vale Railway
- Pre-grouping: Taff Vale Railway
- Post-grouping: Great Western Railway

Key dates
- July 1910: Opened as Beddau Platform
- 1 October 1923: Renamed Beddau Halt
- 31 March 1952: Closed
Location

Beddau Halt railway station was a railway station at Beddau, Rhondda Cynon Taf, Wales.

It consisted of a single platform and shelter reached by steps leading from the road over which the line crossed. Its position was quite a distance from Beddau which limited its patronage, though all trains stopped at the station as a matter of course.

== Modern Day ==
The station site exists on the mothballed Pontyclun-Cwm Colliery line over which trains ran regularly until 1984. While some railway infrastructure still exists such as the sleepers no trace of the platform is evident.

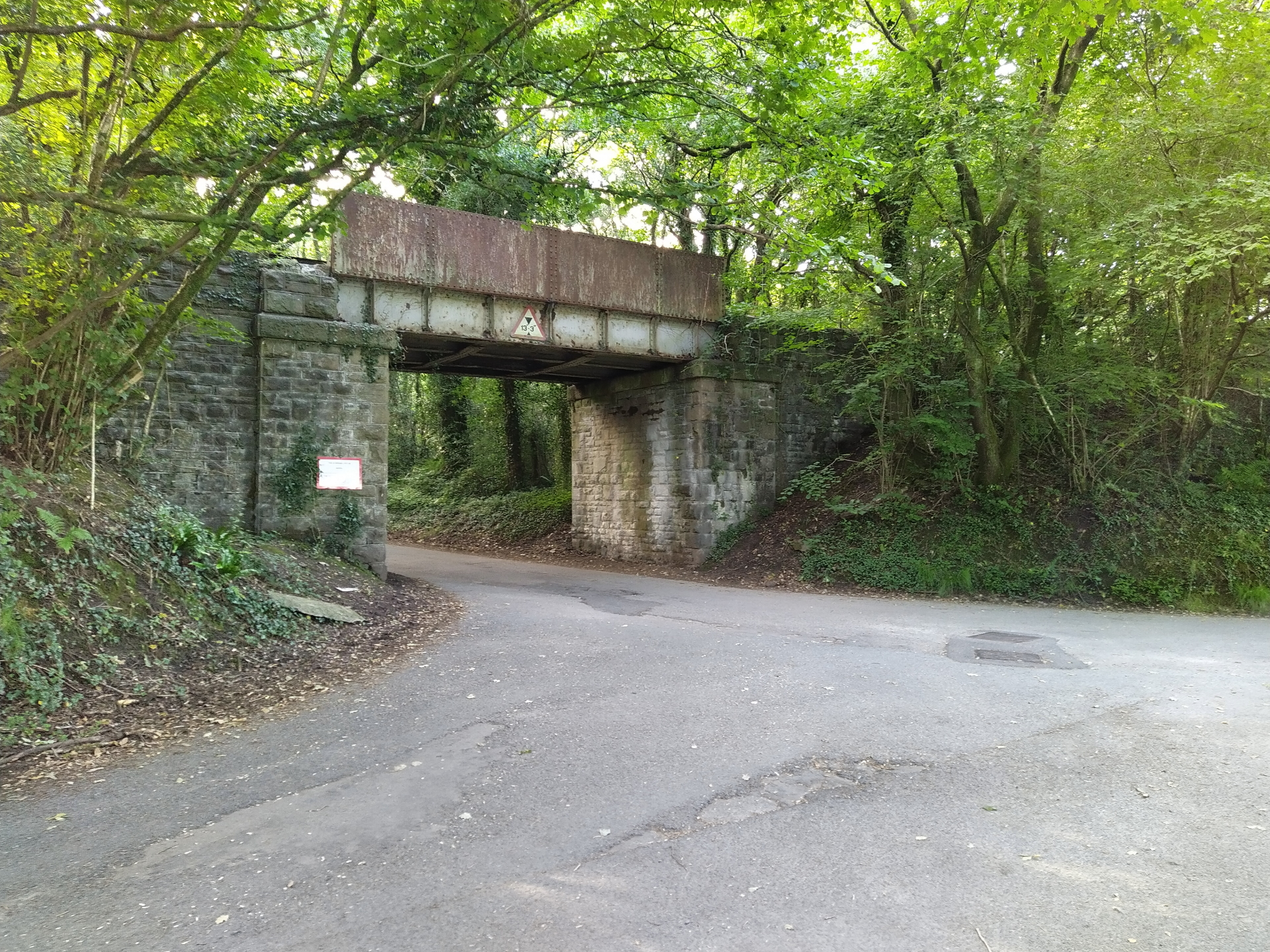
Site of Beddau Halt (2020)

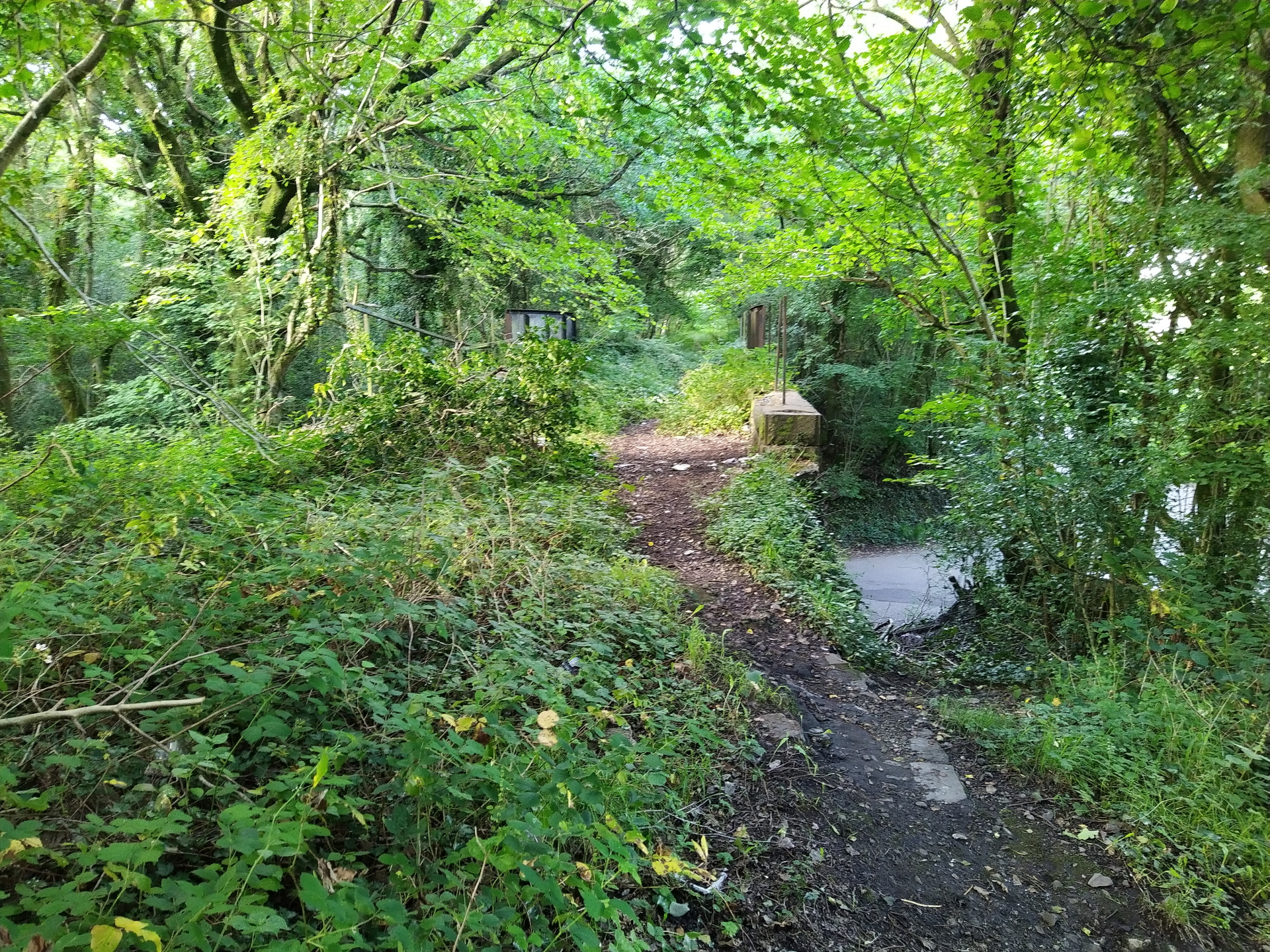
Site of Beddau Halt (2020)

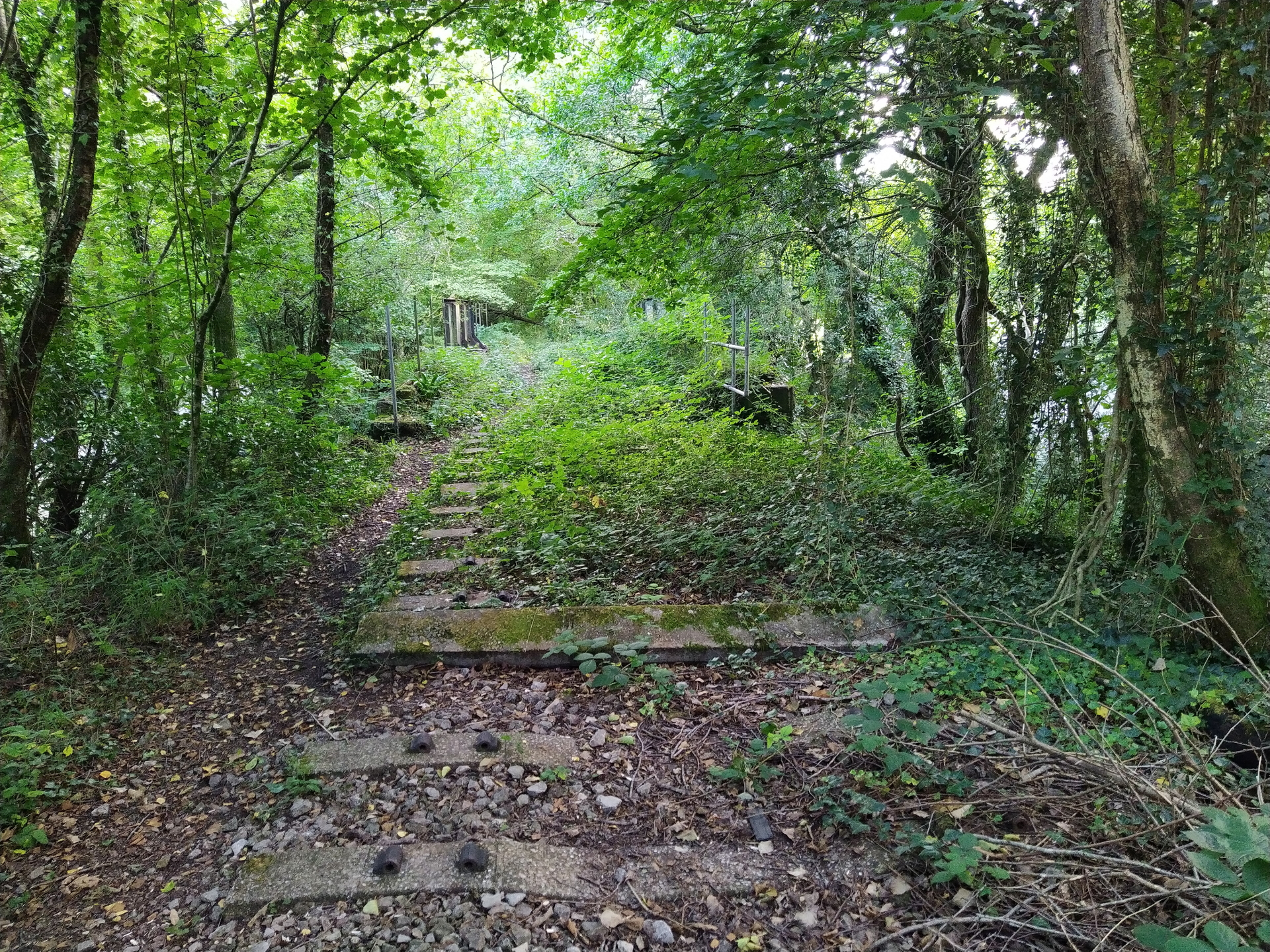
Site of Beddau Halt (2020)

Preceding station	Disused railways	Following station
Llantwit Fardre; Line and station closed	Llantrisant and Taff Vale Junction Railway; Pontypridd-Llantrisant	Cross Inn; Line and station closed
