= Llantwit Fardre railway station =

Former railway station in Wales

Llantwit Fardre

General information
- Location: Llantwit Fardre, Rhondda Cynon Taf; Wales
- Coordinates: 51.5586°N 3.3321°W
- Grid reference: ST077852
- Platforms: 1

Other information
- Status: Disused

History
- Original company: Llantrisant and Taff Vale Junction Railway
- Pre-grouping: Taff Vale Railway
- Post-grouping: Great Western Railway

Key dates
- 21 January 1875: Station opened as Llantwit
- 8 October 1936: Renamed Llantwit Fardre
- 31 March 1952: Station closed
Location

Llantwit Fardre was a station on the Llantrisant and Taff Vale Junction Railway.

The station consisted of a single platform and station buildings. A small bridge crossed over Crown Hill to the west of the station followed by the Dyffryn Red Ash Colliery sidings and a spur to Cwm Colliery. There were numerous tramways for coal workings in this area. One of the sidings consisted of a weigh bridge. To the west of the station existed sidings for the Dyffryn Red Ash Colliery.

== Modern day ==
No trace of the railway station and track exists anymore. The railway bridge to the west on Crown Hill of the station was removed in the 1990s. The Dyffryn Red Ash Colliery sidings have now been built upon and no traces of the tramways exist.

Preceding station	Disused railways	Following station
Church Village Halt; Line and station closed	Llantrisant and Taff Vale Junction Railway; Pontypridd-Llantrisant	Beddau Halt; Line and station closed
