= Wildmill =

Cymraeg (Y Felin Wyllt)

Coordinates: 51.5183°N 3.5821°W

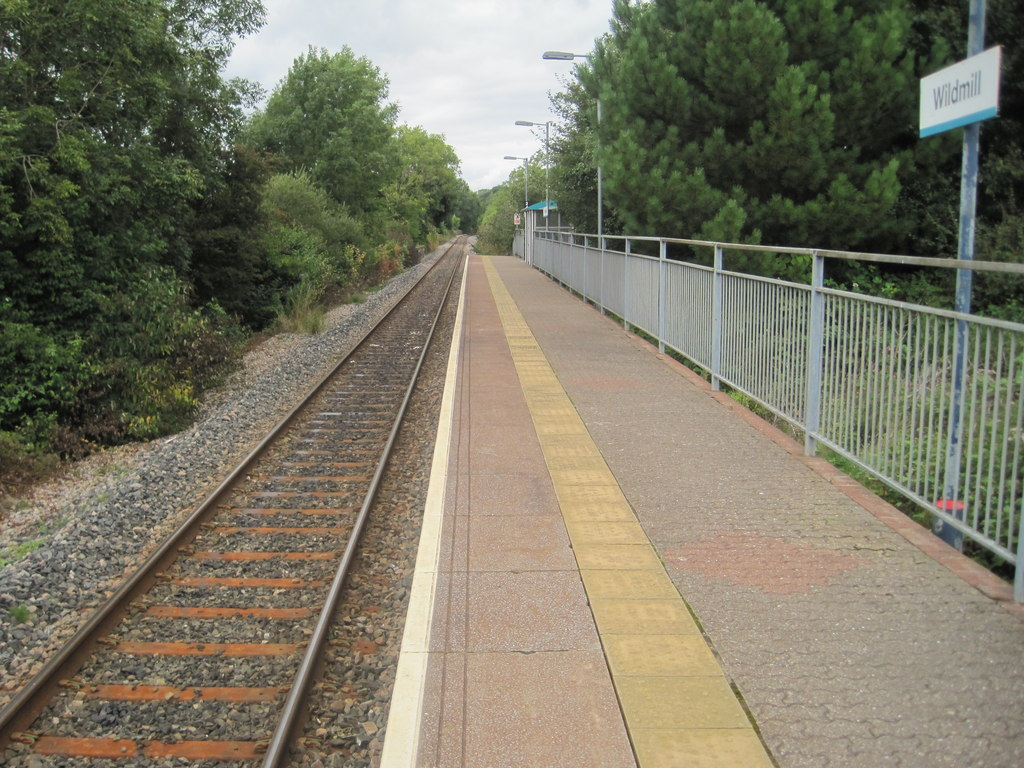
Wildmill railway station, Bridgend

Wildmill or Wild Mill (Welsh: Y Felin-wyllt) is a district in the town of Bridgend, south Wales.

The initial housing estate was built in the late 1960s, using the Radburn design.

The area is served by Wildmill railway station.

Wildmill has often been associated with the working class.
