= Bridgend railway station =

Railway station in Bridgend, Wales

Bridgend Welsh: Pen-y-bont
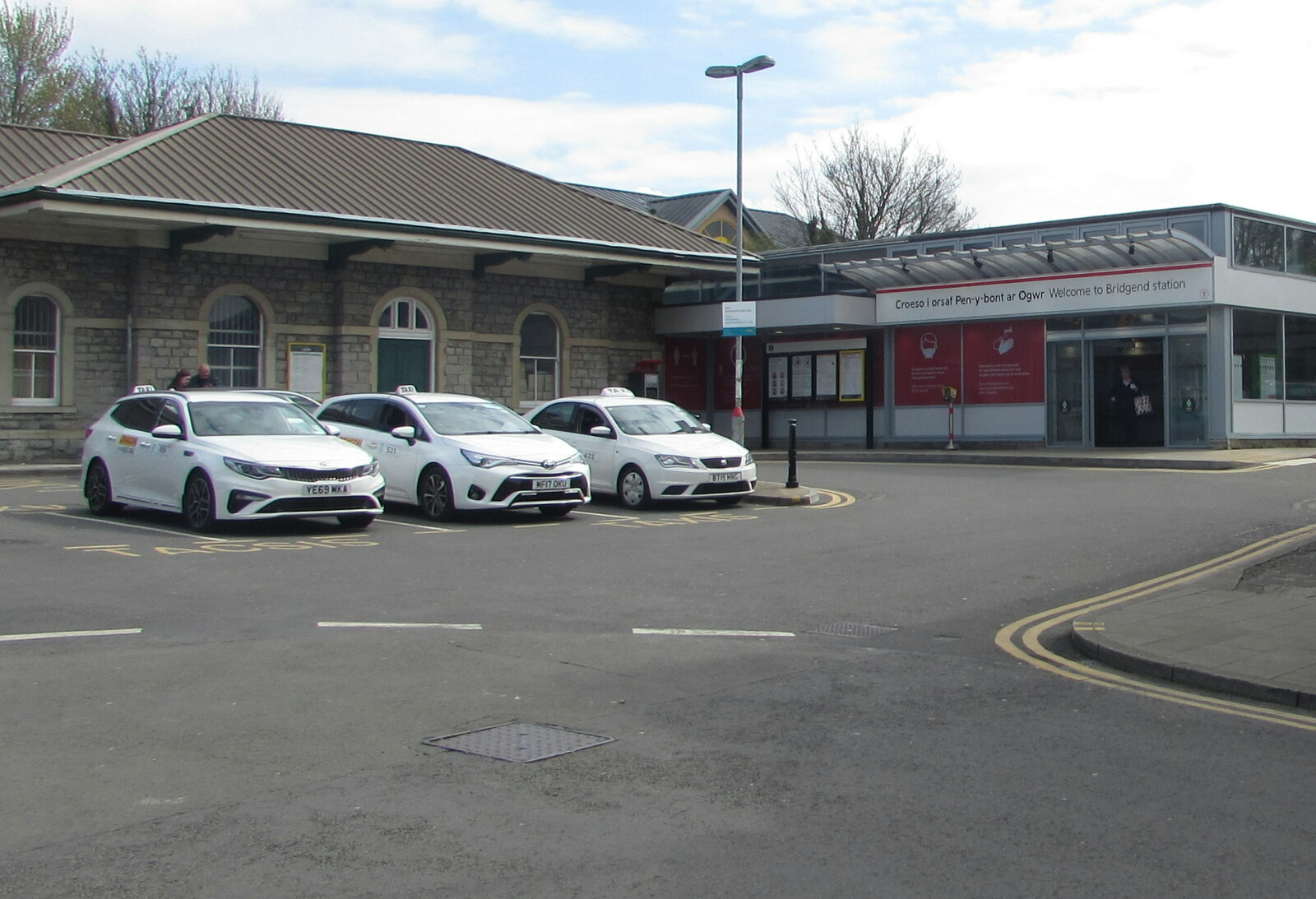
- Station entrance, April 2021

General information
- Location: Bridgend, Bridgend county borough Wales
- Coordinates: 51°30′25″N 3°34′30″W
- Grid reference: SS907798
- Manager: Transport for Wales Rail
- Platforms: 4

Other information
- Station code: BGN
- Classification: DfT category C2

Key dates
- 19 June 1850: Station opened

Passengers
- 2020/21: ▼0.322 million
- Interchange: ▼8,839
- 2021/22: ▲0.937 million
- Interchange: ▲27,812
- 2022/23: ▲1.133 million
- Interchange: ▲33,063
- 2023/24: ▲1.278 million
- Interchange: ▲59,079
- 2024/25: ▲1.380 million
- Interchange: ▼55,517

Listed Building – Grade II
- Feature: Bridgend Railway Station (W.Platform Building)
- Designated: 29 September 1986
- Reference no.: 11306
Location
Notes
- Passenger statistics from the Office of Rail and Road

Bridgend railway station (Welsh: Gorsaf Pen-y-bont) is a main line station serving the town of Bridgend, south Wales. It is located approximately halfway between Cardiff Central and Swansea stations, at the point where the Maesteg Line diverges from the South Wales Main Line; it is also the western terminus of the Vale of Glamorgan Line from Cardiff. It is 190 miles 45 chains (306.7 km) measured from the zero point at London Paddington, via Stroud.

It is the fifth-busiest station in Wales, after Cardiff Central, Newport, Swansea and Cardiff Queen Street.

== History ==
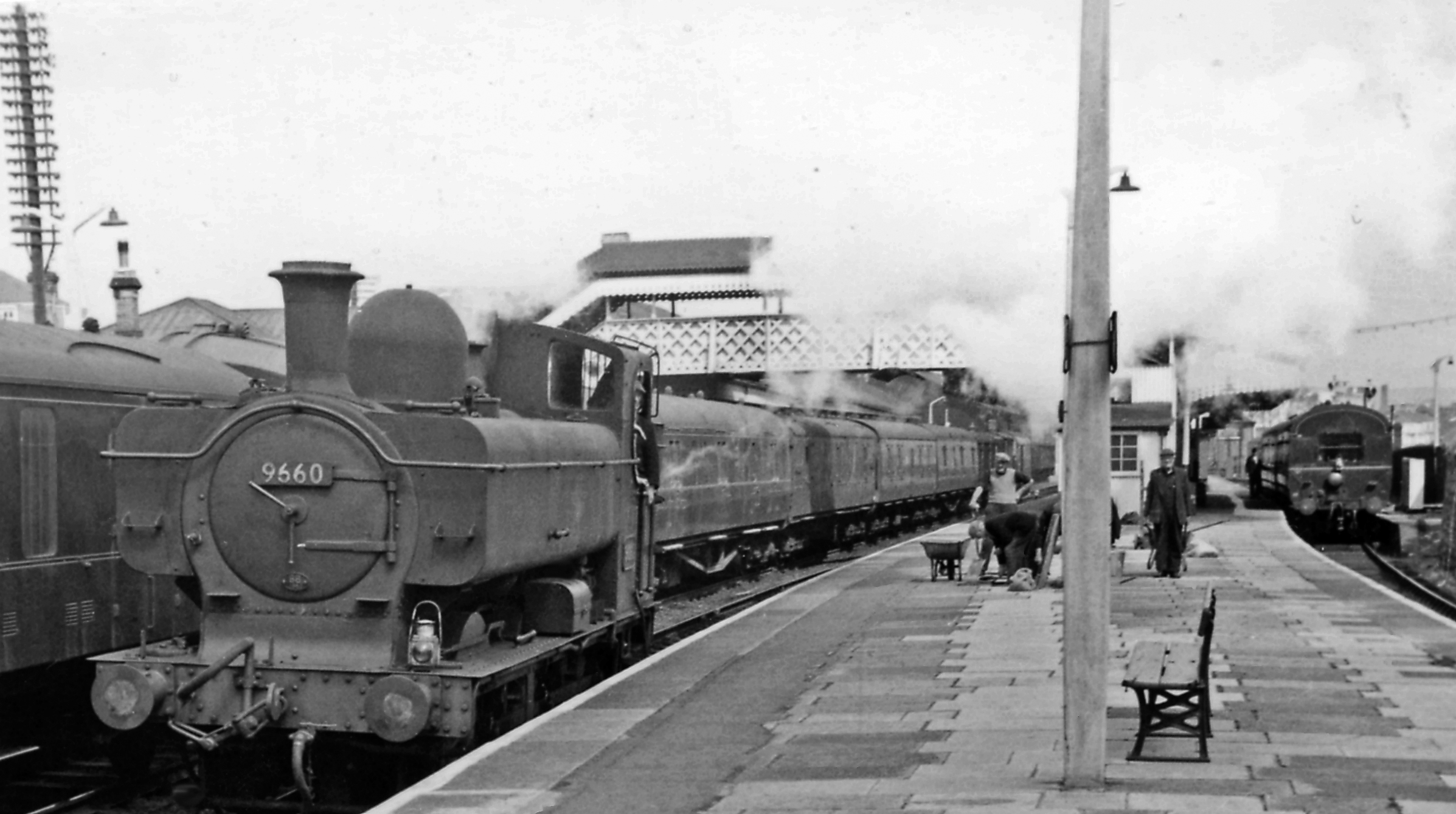
View from the east end of platforms 2 and 3 in 1962

The station was opened on 18 June 1850, and both the main platform building and the 1877 pedestrian bridge are Grade II listed. The station was designed by Isambard Kingdom Brunel.

In 1945, German Field Marshal Gerd von Rundstedt arrived at the station when he was transferred to the Island Farm prisoner of war camp.

Services on both branch lines from the station were withdrawn for a time in the 1960s and early 1970s (trains on the Vale of Glamorgan line fell victim to the Beeching cuts in June 1964, whilst Maesteg trains were withdrawn in July 1970), but because the lines remained in-situ due to coal traffic for the Aberthaw Power Station, each one has since been reopened to passenger services.

Platform 3 was a full-length platform running east-to-west until the 1970s when it was removed following the closure of the Maesteg line to passenger traffic. The cafe/waiting area of platform 2 now occupies land where the track used to sit.

Platform 1A was opened in June 2005 by Andrew Davies to act as the terminus for the newly reopened Vale of Glamorgan Line, with trains now running through to and from Aberdare.

A second, and fully accessible footbridge, was built in 2012 at a cost of £2.4 million and the main station ticket hall and entrance was refurbished in 2018 at a cost of £1.5 million.

== Facilities ==
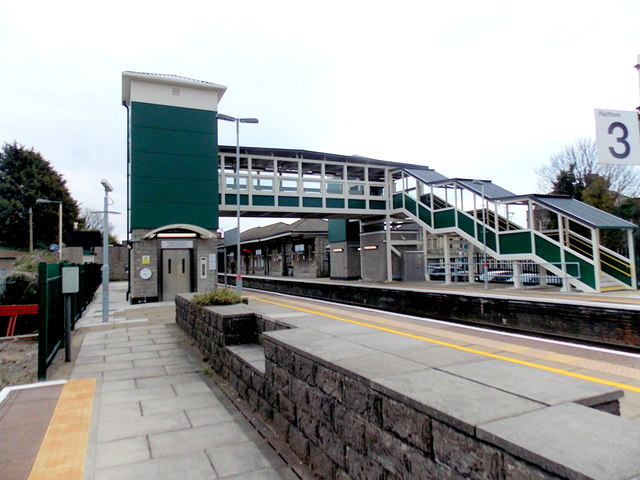
New fully accessible footbridge which was built in 2012

The station is fully staffed throughout the week, with the ticket office on platform 1 open from early morning until mid-evening. A self-service ticket machine is also provided for use and for the collection of prepaid tickets. There is a waiting room and photo booth in the main building on platform 1, whist the amenities on platform 2 include toilets and a coffee shop. Train running details are offered via CIS displays, automatic announcements and timetable posters. Step-free access is available to all platforms via lifts in the accessible footbridge at the northern end.

== Services ==
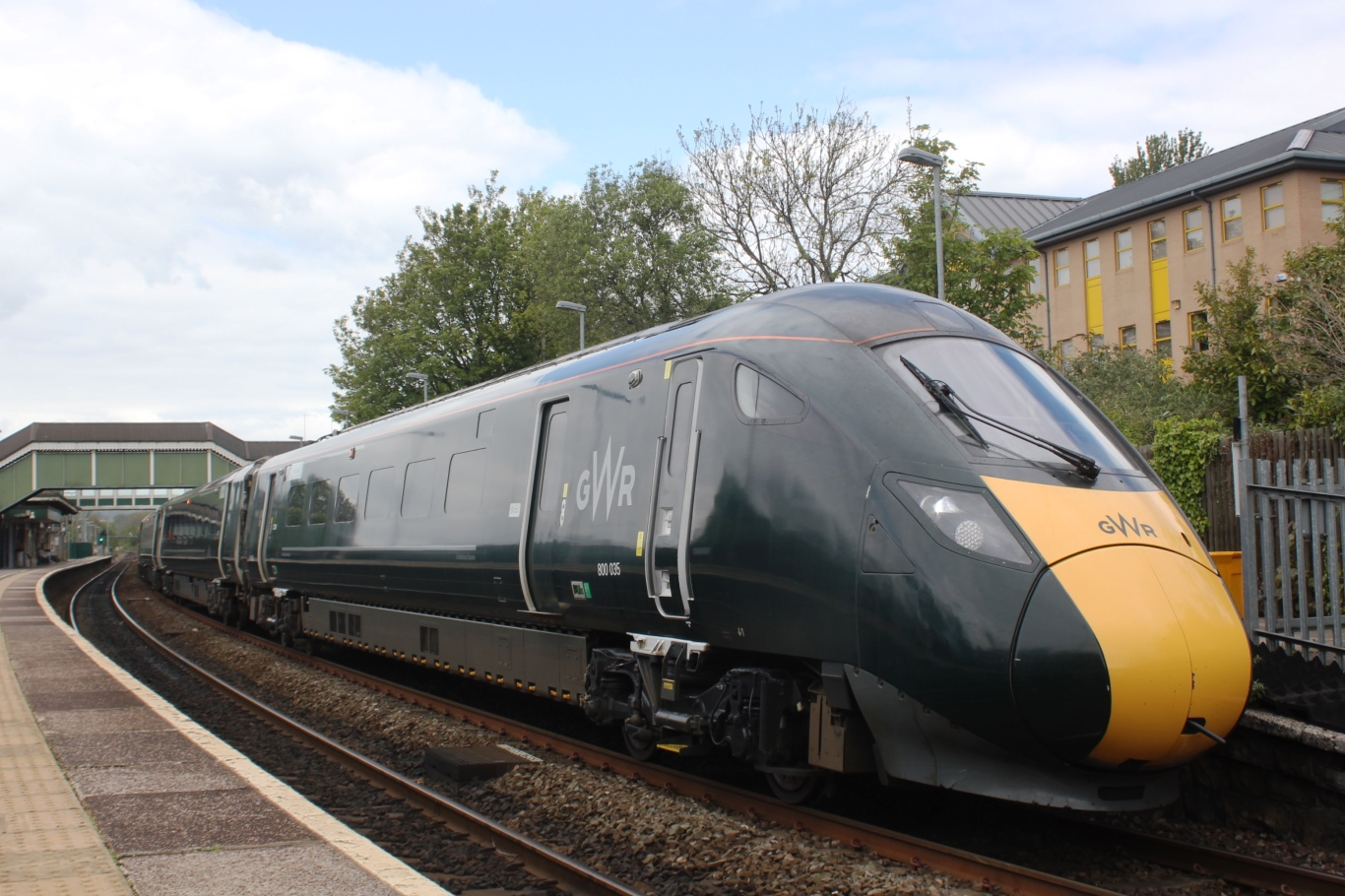
GWR Class 800 service to London

Passenger services are operated by Great Western Railway to and from London Paddington and Swansea, with some services extended to Carmarthen; and by Transport for Wales to destinations across Wales.

To the west, Transport for Wales trains run along the South Wales Main Line and West Wales Line to Swansea and then to Carmarthen, Pembroke Dock, Milford Haven or Fishguard Harbour.

Mainline services to Swansea and London run hourly (with extra services at peak hours), whilst the regional trains to Manchester Piccadilly via Shrewsbury and local trains to Maesteg and over the Vale of Glamorgan Line also run hourly; the Swanline local stopping trains to/from Swansea run every two hours.

Preceding station	National Rail	Following station
Pencoed	Transport for Wales; Maesteg line	Wildmill
Llantwit Major	Transport for Wales; Vale line	Terminus
Cardiff Central	Transport for Wales; Swanline	Pyle
Pencoed	Transport for Wales; South Wales Main Line	Port Talbot Parkway
Cardiff Central	Great Western Railway; London – Swansea	Port Talbot Parkway
	Historical railways	
Southerndown Road; Line open; station closed	Barry Railway; Vale of Glamorgan Railway	Terminus

== Platforms ==
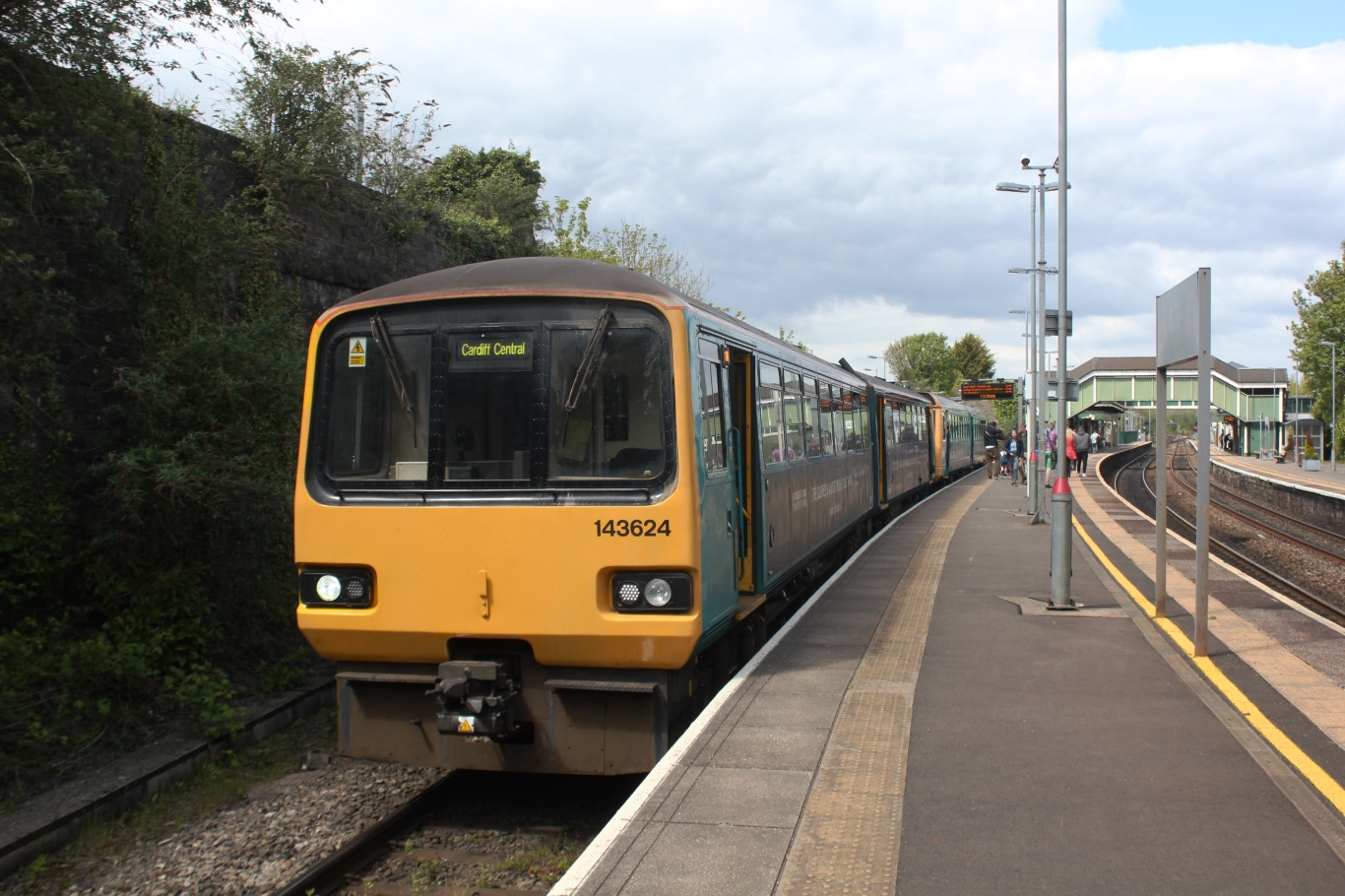
Class 143 in platform 1A

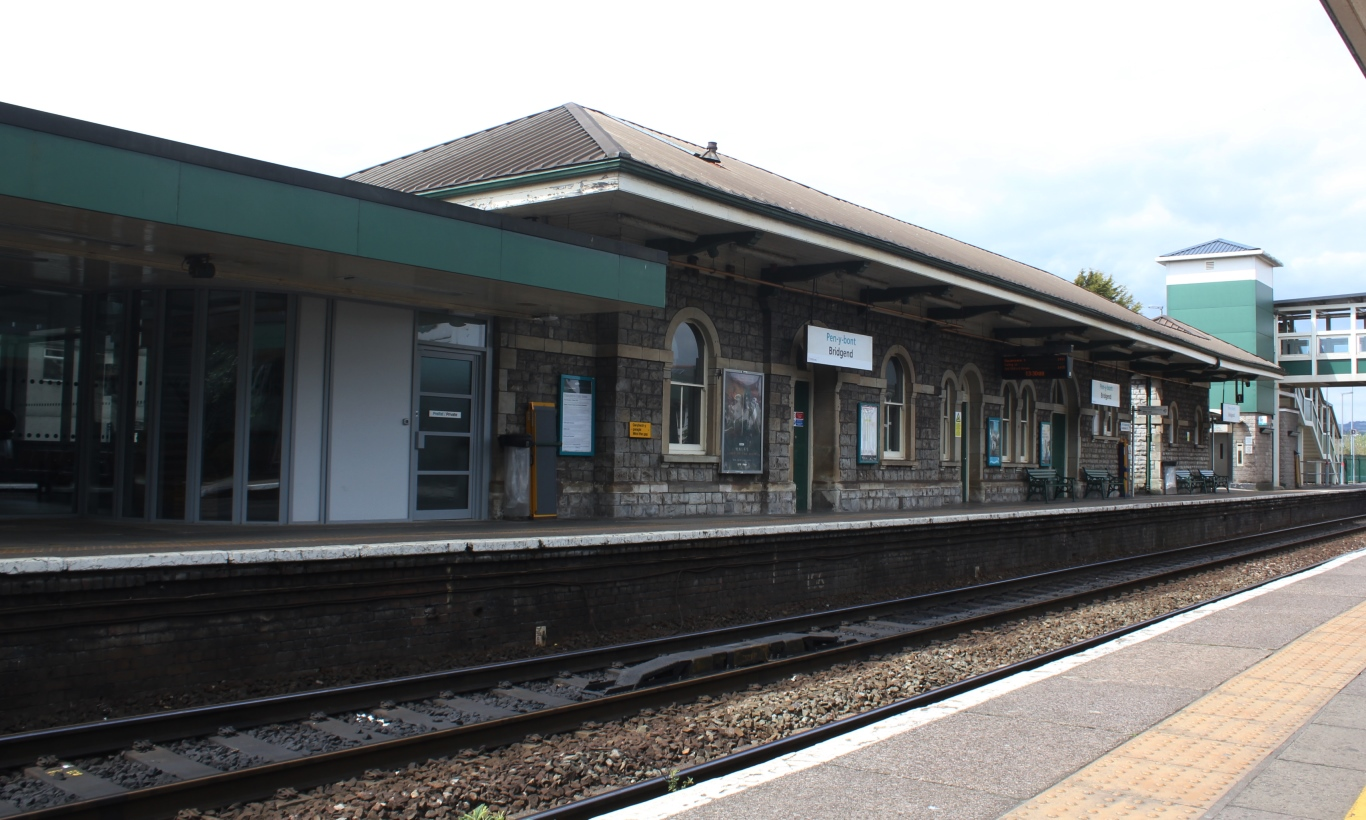
Platform 1

- Platform 1A
  - Transport for Wales:
    - Aberdare via Llantwit Major, Barry and Cardiff Central (some services terminate at Cardiff Central).
    - Terminating services from Rhymney and Cardiff Central. One morning service terminates here from Caerphilly
- Platform 1
  - Great Western Railway:
    - Swansea via Port Talbot Parkway and Neath.
    - Carmarthen via Swansea.
  - Transport for Wales & Swanline:
    - Swansea via Port Talbot Parkway and Neath.
    - Maesteg via Wildmill.
    - Milford Haven via Carmarthen from either Cardiff Central or Manchester Piccadilly
    - Pembroke Dock via Carmarthen from either Cardiff Central or Manchester Piccadilly
    - Fishguard Harbour via Carmarthen from either Cardiff Central or Cheltenham Spa
    - Shrewsbury via Swansea on the Heart of Wales Line (limited service).

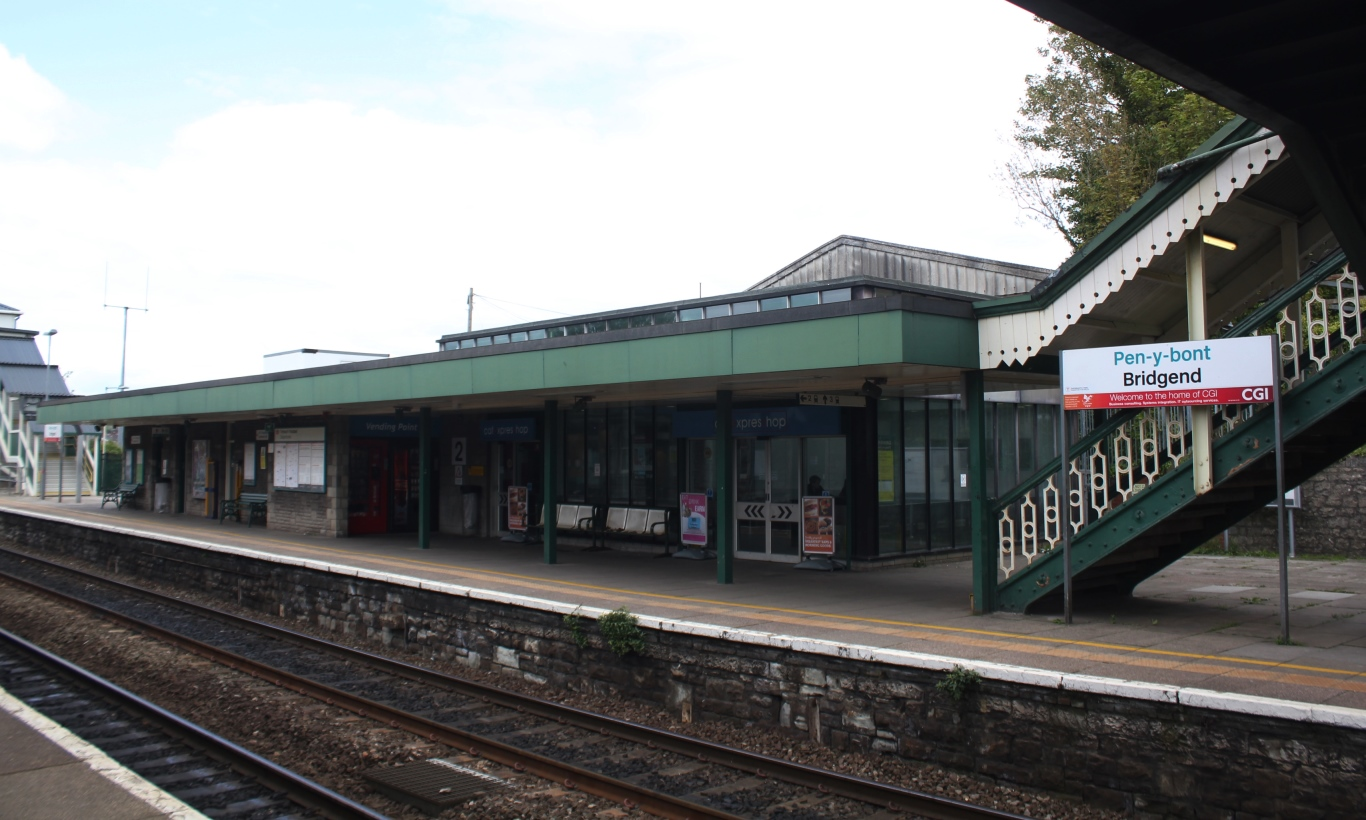
Platform 2

- Platform 2
  - Great Western Railway:
    - London Paddington via Cardiff Central and Reading.
  - Transport for Wales & Swanline:
    - Cardiff Central services that start at Swansea.
    - Manchester Piccadilly via Crewe.
    - Cheltenham Spa via Newport & Gloucester from Maesteg.

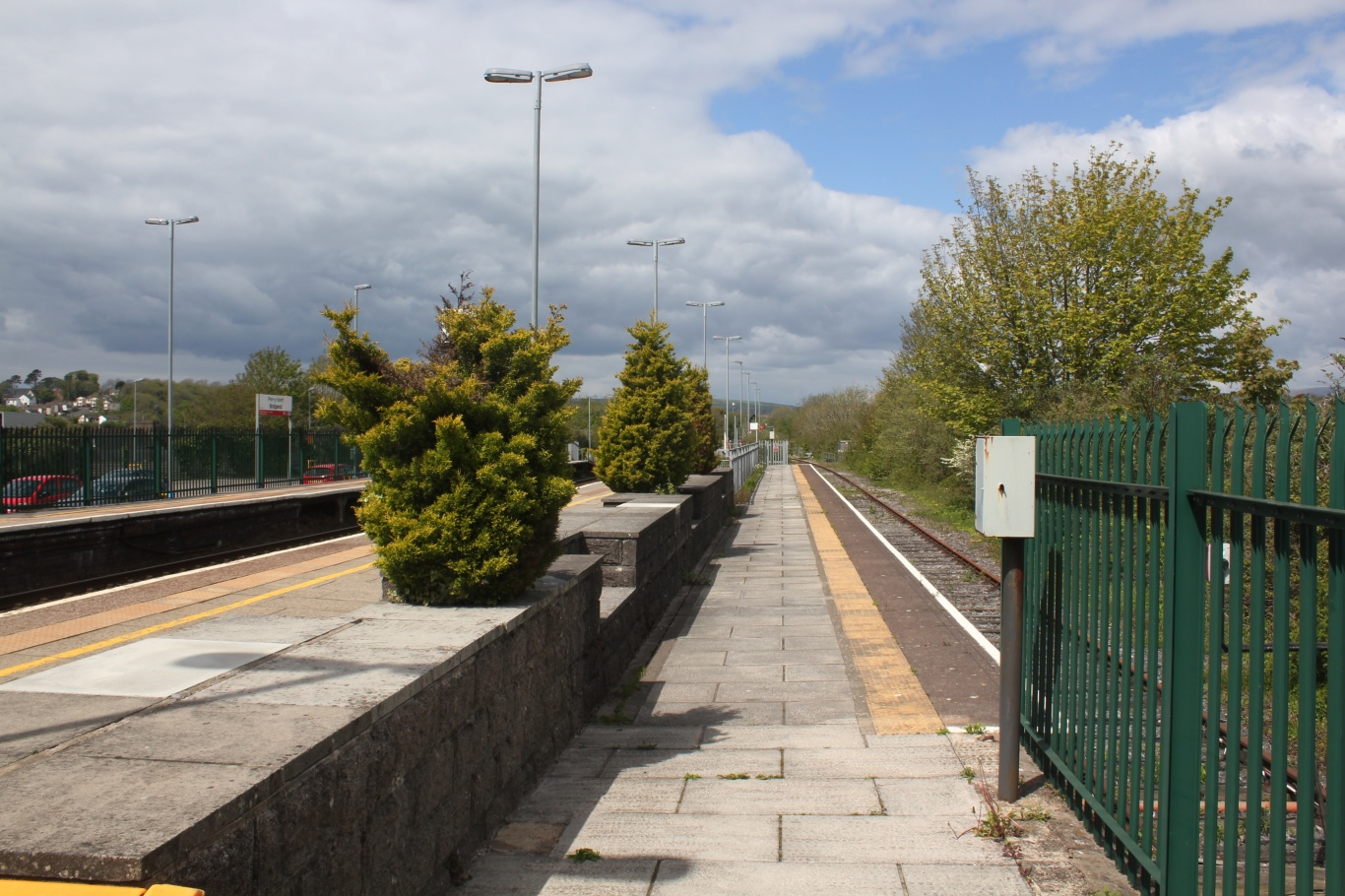
Platform 3

- Platform 3
  - Transport for Wales:
    - Maesteg via Wildmill.
    - Terminating services from Maesteg.

Platforms 1 and 2 are full length platforms used for all long-distance services on the South Wales Main Line.

Platform 1A was opened in 2005 and is a bay platform which acts as the terminus for the Vale of Glamorgan Line.

Platform 3 was briefly recommissioned in the early 2000s as an overflow bay platform facing west (it was previously the through outer face of an island platform until removal in the mid-1970s), and was used for services from Maesteg, although has since fallen into non-use.

== Accidents and incidents ==
- In December 1965 a fatal collision occurred with a derailed Class 47, D1671, and D6983 travelling to Swansea, as the result of a landslip. The damage was so severe that D6983 was the first EE Type 3 to be withdrawn and as a result, the only locomotive in the entire class not to receive a TOPS number. The wreckage blocked the South Wales mainline and the Vale of Glamorgan line. Trains had to be diverted via the Vale of Neath line until unluckily a landslip blocked that route also. After the lines reopened, the remains of both locomotives were sold to local scrap merchants R.S. Hayes and cut up the following year.
- On 5 May 2012, a dead body was found on the railway, near the station. The death was treated as unexplained.
