= Llantrisant and Taff Vale Junction Railway =

Former Welsh railway company

The Llantrisant and Taff Vale Junction Railway (L&TVJR) was a railway company that constructed a standard gauge line in South Wales, connecting Llantrisant and the Taff Vale Railway near Treforest. It ran through thinly populated country, and linked to a number of iron mines, collieries and other mineral sites. It opened in stages in 1863 and 1864. In 1865 through passenger trains from the Cowbridge Railway ran over the line, to Pontypridd, although for some time there were no passenger stations on its own network. At the Llantrisant end, it was reliant on broad gauge railway companies which were not always friendly to it. The company leased its line to the Taff Vale Railway in 1870.

In 1866 it seemed likely that coal from the Ogmore Valley would be conveyed on a new line across the L&TVJR area, and powers were obtained to build the line, but the opportunity passed and when the line was finally built, in 1886, but its potential traffic had almost vanished.

The Treferig Railway opened its line in 1883 branching off the L&TVJR to serve mineral sites in Nant Mychydd. Also short of money, it leased its line to the Taff Vale Railway in 1884.

In 1952 the passenger traffic on the line was discontinued, and as the mineral activity in the area declined, so did the use of the line. It closed completely in 1987.

== Before the railway ==
The iron industries of Dowlais and Merthyr needed transport systems to take their products to market, and to bring raw materials to them. At first the raw materials were found locally, and brought in on the backs of animals, and later by primitive mineral tramroads. The conveyance of their output away mostly involved getting it to Cardiff for coastal shipping, and at first this was done by animal power too.

The Glamorganshire Canal was opened in stages between 1792 and 1794, and its authorising act of Parliament, the Glamorganshire Canal Act 1790 (30 Geo. 3. c. 82), included a general permission to build tramroads as feeders from mines within four miles of the canal: the so-called "four-mile clause", (Note: The canal's authorising act of Parliament included clauses permitting the construction of tramroads from pits with four miles of the canal, to connect to the canal itself. No further legislation was required and landowners were not permitted to obstruct the construction over their land, provided compensation was paid.) which did much to foster mineral working in the area.

There was workable coal south of Treforest and by 1810 a tramroad had been made from the canal at Pont Maesmawr to Maesbach. From Pont Maesmawr it ran east, immediately crossing the River Taff by a floating bridge, that is, a ferry, at the ford just below Upper Boat. The pit had mixed fortunes but by 1842 it had enlarged considerably, employing 157 persons.

== Taff Vale Railway ==
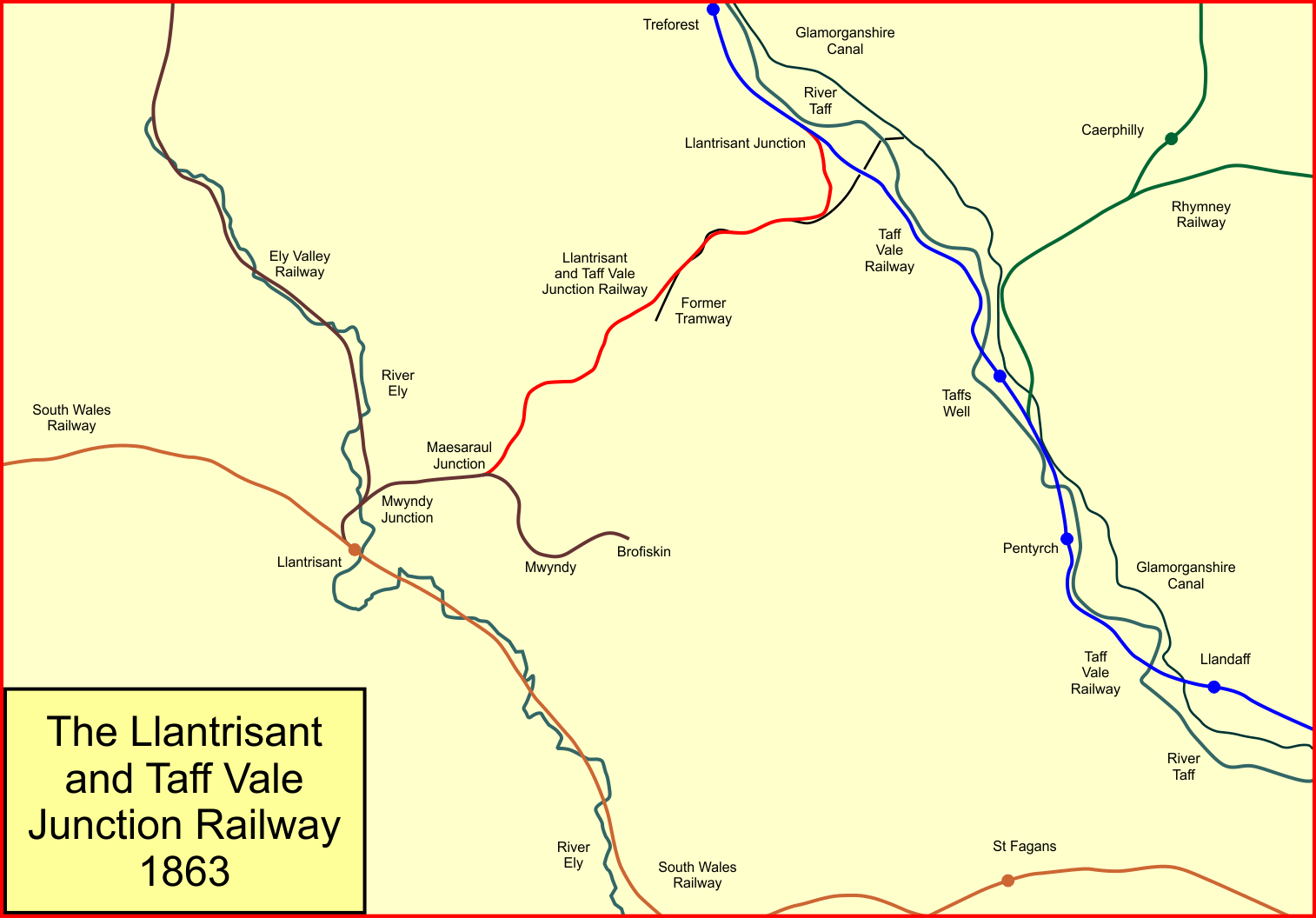
The Llantrisant and Taff Vale Junction Railway

In time the canal became overwhelmed by the volume of traffic, and encouraged by the successful opening of railways with more advanced technology than the horse tramways of previous years, the Taff Vale Railway was promoted. It was authorised by Parliament in 1836 and it opened between Merthyr and Cardiff docks in 1841. The line passed close to the Maesmawr workings but did not make a connection.

== Powell's tramroad ==
Thomas Powell had extensive colliery interests in Monmouthshire and Glamorganshire, and he needed to get a transport link to pits he owned at Llantwit Fardre. Failing to generate interest elsewhere, he determined to build a railway himself to the Glamorganshire Canal at Maesmawr from Llantwit Fardre. This was known as the Dihewyd Railway or the Llantwit Fardre Railway. It was completed by 28 December 1843 and a connection to the Taff Vale Railway was opened on 25 April 1844, when a train of Powell's coal was taken to Cardiff. His line climbed out of Maesmawr on a 297-yard self-acting incline at a gradient of 1 in 6.6. The line was later extended to Ystradbarwig colliery.

== Broad gauge railways ==
A trunk railway came to the area when the South Wales Railway opened between Chepstow and Swansea on 18 June 1850; it was a broad gauge line allied to the Great Western Railway. A Llantrisant station was opened on the line, although it was located nearly two miles from the town. The town of Cowbridge, which had been on the route of a mail coach for many years, felt the disadvantage of being by-passed keenly, and there was much discussion of how a branch line railway might be built; these talks were not fruitful for some years, however.

On the north side of the South Wales Railway route matters were more successful, for the Ely Valley Railway was incorporated by the Ely Valley Railway Act 1857 (20 & 21 Vict. c. xli). This railway was primarily intended to reach the mineral districts close to Llantrisant, with branches to Glanmychydd (or Castellau), and Gellyrhaidd, near Hendreforgan. In 1858 further authority was obtained to build a branch to Mwyndy and Broviskin (Brofiscin). These were broad gauge lines, allied to the South Wales Railway, but this proved to be a considerable disadvantage, frustrating easy access to Cardiff Docks and the ironworks of Merthyr and Dowlais.

The Ely Tidal Harbour and Railway had been incorporated in 1856, and the following year it changed its name to the Penarth Harbour Dock and Railway, on getting authority to construct a dock at Penarth. It was constructing a railway from the Taff Vale Railway at Radyr; (Note: The passenger station was not opened until 1883.) the intention was to provide an alternative to Cardiff Docks and the railways approaching them, which were exceedingly congested. The railway part of this was complete on 18 July 1859, although the dock construction took considerably longer. In January 1859 the Penarth company, seeing a commercial opportunity, approached the Ely Valley Railway proposing a physical connection between their lines, enabling Ely Valley production to be shipped at Penarth. Under this scheme, the Ely Valley Railway Company would convert its gauge to narrow (standard) gauge.

The Ely Valley Railway Company found favour in the proposals; the cheapest way to make the physical connection would be over the South Wales Railway main line between Llantrisant and a point immediately west of Cardiff station, joining the Penarth line there. The talks seemed to be progressing well, but were abandoned by the Ely Valley company abruptly, and shortly afterwards the Great Western Railway (not the South Wales Railway) leased the Ely Valley line, in order to secure access to its locomotive coal colliery at Gyfeillon. Daniel Gooch wrote:

"Our object in taking the line would be chiefly for getting a connection to our own colliery and also to get, some day, into the steam coal not yet opened out."

The lease was effective from 1 January 1861. On 2 August 1860 the Ely Valley Railway had opened its main line from Llantrisant to Penrhiwfer.

== The Llantrisant and Taff Vale Junction Railway ==
The issue of conveyance of the iron ore of the district to market remained unresolved, and on 12 September 1860, a Merthyr solicitor named W. Simons approached the Taff Vale Railway (TVR) board. He said that he had acquired the Llantwit Vardre tramroad for £9,000, and was prepared to make that the core of a new railway from Llantrisant to the Taff Vale line. He wanted a premium for his trouble, and to be appointed solicitor to the scheme. The TVR general superintendent, George Fisher, was instructed to investigate the matter; he found that the idea was plausible, although not all of the Llantwit Vardre line was required, and a new junction with the TVR north of the tramroad junction would need to be made, avoiding the steep incline. The cost of the line would be £30,000.

If a new company, the Llantrissant and Taff Vale Junction Railway, (Note: This was the spelling at the time.) were authorised, the TVR would contribute £10,000 to the share issue. Mwyndy to Merthyr would be 19 miles, one-third of the route via Neath currently in use, (Note: Broad gauge traffic reached Merthyr over the South Wales Railway to Neath and then the Vale of Neath Railway.) and easy access to Penarth Docks would be available. In fact Simons' title to the Llantwit Vardre Tramroad turned out to be defective, but the L&TVJR scheme went ahead anyway. The capital requirement was increased to £40,000 now that acquisition of some of the land was more difficult. One third of the sum would be subscribed by the TVR; and Simons was invited to sever his connection with the L&TVJR.

In November 1860 plans were deposited for the parliamentary bill. The main line would run from a junction somewhat to the north of the Llantwit Vardre connection to the TVR near Treforest, with a line closely paralleling the tramroad connection alongside the incline also available as an alternative. The main line ran to a junction with the Ely Valley Railway near Cross Inn; the junction was to become Maesaraul Junction. There were also a Mine Works Branch to the Bute iron ore mine, and the Llantrisant Common Branch to pits there.

Powell was still the apparent owner of the Llantwit Vardre Railway, and although he opposed the L&TVJR bill in Parliament, afterwards he offered to sell the line to the L&TVJR, and this was agreed. In committee, the Mine Works Branch was removed from the powers, and use of the Ely Valley Railway's Mwyndy branch was inserted, with running powers for the L&TVJR and of course mixed gauge installed. At this stage there were no running powers into Llantrisant station: these were added through negotiation concerning the Cowbridge Railway, on the south side of the South Wales Main Line, by agreement dated 9 January 1864.

Llantrissant and Taff Vale Junction Railway Act 1861
- Act of Parliament
- Parliament of the United Kingdom
- Long title: An Act for making a Railway from the Taff Vale Railway in the Parish of Lantwit Vardre in the County of Glamorgan to Llantrissant in the same County, with Branches therefrom, to be called "The Llantrissant and Taff Vale Junction Railway;" and for other Purposes.
- Citation: 24 & 25 Vict. c. li

Dates
- Royal assent: 7 June 1861

The Llantrissant and Taff Vale Junction Railway was incorporated by the Llantrissant and Taff Vale Junction Railway Act 1861 (24 & 25 Vict. c. li) of 7 June 1861; it was to acquire the Llantwit Vardre Railway; capital was set at £40,000, and the company could arrange for the Taff Vale Railway to work its line.

== Opening ==
On 17 September 1863 the line was opened between Llantrisant Junction (near Treforest) and the Llantwit collieries. (Note: From Chapman; Barrie says all the original lines opened December 1863.) By 29 January 1864 the line was extended to a new colliery to the west of Llantwit, and on to Llantwit Dynevor Colliery and Cross Inn, just short of Maesaraul Junction. The provision of mixed gauge on the Mwyndy branch was much delayed by the GWR, only being ready on 5 December 1864, from which date the majority of the iron ore traffic was able to take the new route.

== Cowbridge Railway ==
The residents of Cowbridge had long yearned for a railway connection, and on 29 July 1862 the Cowbridge Railway was authorised. The Taff Vale Railway was to contribute £10,000 to the subscription list. The Cowbridge Railway was to cross the South Wales Railway main line and come north as far as Maesaraul junction, joining the Llantrisant and Taff Vale Junction Railway there. However it became obvious that the Cowbridge company was going to have serious trouble securing the capital it needed, and a compromise was reached. It would build its line between Cowbridge and Llantrisant only, and the Great Western Railway would mix the gauge on the section of the Ely Valley line between Llantrisant and Maesaraul Junction. This would enable the Cowbridge narrow (standard) gauge trains to run through to Pontypridd over the L&TVJR and the Taff Vale Railway.

The approval of the Board of Trade inspecting officer was required to open the line for passenger traffic, and there were a succession of shortcomings in the arrangements at Maesaraul and on the Cowbridge Railway. Nevertheless, by 16 January 1865 a Taff Vale engine was run through from Pontypridd to Cowbridge and a revenue-earning mineral train ran through on 30 January 1865. The Llantrisant and Taff Vale Junction Railway was passed for passenger traffic on 29 August 1865.

There was now a through passenger service between Cowbridge and Pontypridd, but there was no station on the L&TVJR line, causing criticism. Succumbing to the pressure, the Company opened a station at Llantwit Fardre, ready by January 1867. Cross Inn station followed on 6 September 1869, this being intended to be the station for Llantrisant. (The South Wales Railway station was some distance away.)

The Cowbridge Railway had been built to a shoddy standard and was desperately short of money before and after opening. The Taff Vale Railway was working the line and became concerned that it would suffer in the event of an accident, and it pressed the Cowbridge company to undertake improvement work, which it could not afford. Under pressure, the Cowbridge company gave notice that it would operate the line itself, which it did from 4 April 1870.

The L&TVJR had been working the trains, but did not have powers to operate over the Ely Valley line, having done so as agent for the Cowbridge company only. A legalistic impasse seemed to be developing, but in fact the L&TVJR ran its trains into the Cowbridge Railway station at Llantrisant, paying a rental of £200 annually to the GWR for using the line from Maesaraul Junction, and £70 for the share of station expenses at Llantrisant. The through working from Pontypridd to Cowbridge could not, for the time being, continue.

The change of working did nothing to improve the physical state of the Cowbridge Railway, and its financial situation worsened. In desperation, in 1875 the company was obliged to ask the Taff Vale Railway to take it over, on the TVR's terms. This was done, and through working of passenger trains from Cowbridge to Pontypridd was resumed.

== Leased to the Taff Vale Railway ==
Llantrissant and Taff Vale Junction Railway Act 1870
- Act of Parliament
- Parliament of the United Kingdom
- Long title: An Act to authorise the Llantrissant and Taff Vale Junction Railway Company to abandon the construction of a certain railway authorised by "The Llantrissant and Taff Vale Junction Railway Act, 1866;" and to extend the time for the completion of another railway authorised by the same Act; and to lease their undertaking to the Taff Vale Railway Company; and for other purposes.
- Citation: 33 & 34 Vict. c. lxxiii

Dates
- Royal assent: 20 June 1870

Text of statute as originally enacted

The L&TVJR had always been a dependency of the Taff Vale Railway, and in 1870 this was formalised, when the Llantrissant and Taff Vale Junction Railway Act 1870 (33 & 34 Vict. c. lxxiii) of 20 June 1870 authorised the lease of the line to the Taff Vale for 999 years. (The residual Llantrisant and Taff Vale Junction Railway Company was absorbed by the Taff Vale Railway by the Taff Vale Railway (Amalgamation and Capital) Act 1889 (52 & 53 Vict. c. cxciii) of 26 August 1889.)

== Developments in the Ogmore Valley ==
In 1863 John Brogden and Son leased extensive coal bearing areas in the Ogmore Valley, to the north-west of Llantrisant; the intention was to export the bituminous coal through Porthcawl Harbour. However the harbour there was seriously deficient in its capacity, notwithstanding improvement works costing £250,000 in 1867. In any case the principal market for the mineral output was at the ironworks at Merthyr, Dowlais and nearby. The Ogmore Valley Railway was opened in 1865 to convey the minerals to Tondu, joining there the Llynvi Valley Railway; the two railways combined to form the Llynvi and Ogmore Railway in 1866. The Ogmore Valley Railway had been built as a narrow (standard) gauge line, and the Llynvi line and other nearby lines were broad gauge lines. The OVR urgently needed a narrow gauge connection, and the Taff Vale was the obvious partner to supply it. However relations were not friendly, and competing parliamentary bills were presented in successive sessions, also by the Great Western Railway and the Ely Valley Railway.

Llantrissant and Taff Vale Junction Railway Act 1866
- Act of Parliament
- Parliament of the United Kingdom
- Long title: An Act to enable the Llantrissant and Taff Vale Junction Railway Company to make Railways to join the Railway of the Penarth Harbour, Dock, and Railway Company, and the Ely Valley Railway, and to form an additional Junction with their Llantrissant Common Branch; and for other Purposes.
- Citation: 29 & 30 Vict. c. ccxlviii

Dates
- Royal assent: 23 July 1866

Text of statute as originally enacted

The L&TVJR won this battle, securing the Llantrissant and Taff Vale Junction Railway Act 1866 (29 & 30 Vict. c. ccxlviii) on 23 July 1866. It would build a new line on a north-west to south-east diagonal, from the Ely Valley Railway at Ynysmaerdy to Waterhall Junction south of Radyr. (Note: The proposed section from Common Branch Junction to Waterhall Junction was referred to as "Railway No. 1" in the authorising legislation, and the term became frequently used.)

The GWR had given an assurance in the parliamentary committee that the company would install mixed gauge between Hendreforgan, where there was a junction with the Ogmore Valley Railway, and Ynysmaerdy (Llantrisant Common Junction) and so OVR trains could reach the L&TVJR from the north-west.

Waterhall Junction was to be built on the line of the Penarth Harbour Dock and Railway, giving direct access to Penarth Harbour. (The Waterhall Junction was originally planned to be triangular, allowing trains to turn north and reach the lower part of the Taff Vale Railway system, but this was not built.)

This new diagonal line would pass through the Common Branch, and at Common Branch Junction the trains would also be able turn north to reach Pontypridd.

This looked like excellent business for the L&TVJR: a new heavy flow of minerals from Ogmore Valley to Penarth and to Pontypridd would pass right across its system. In fact there was a serious financial crisis in 1866 – 1867, and construction work had to be suspended for the time being. The time allowed for construction expired, and the company had to go to Parliament for an extension of time; it had to undertake to haul minerals via Llantrisant Junction (near Treforest) at the same rate (to traders) as if the Waterhall line had actually been built.

Further obstructive manoeuvering frustrated early completion of the through route, and eventually it was the gauge conversion of the Great Western Railway lines that unblocked the difficulty.

== The end of broad gauge ==
The broad gauge group of railways in South Wales converted their gauge to narrow (standard) gauge in May 1872, bringing to an end the need for transshipment of goods and minerals at Llantrisant.

This had significant implications for the New Lines diagonal route. It had been conceived to carry the Ogmore coal to Penarth, but now that the South Wales Main Line was standard gauge, the traffic went by that route, and it was clear that if the diagonal route to Waterhall Junction were built, it would not carry much traffic. The TVR wished to abandon the construction of it, but there were heavy penalty clauses in the authorising act of Parliament in this event; moreover a new colliery had been opened on the route and it was likely that the proprietor would successfully seek compensation if the line was not built.

Perhaps the most important factor was that the presumed construction of the line was important in negotiating apportionment (as between the TVR group of railways and the GWR group) of through rates for the mineral traffic from the Ogmore Valley.

Llantrissant and Taff Vale Junction Railway (Extension of Time) Act 1877
- Act of Parliament
- Parliament of the United Kingdom
- Long title: An Act for further extending the time for the completion of Railway No. 1 authorised by the Llantrissant and Taff Vale Junction Railway Act, 1866.
- Citation: 40 & 41 Vict. c. cxxxvii

Dates
- Royal assent: 2 August 1877

Text of statute as originally enacted

An extension of time for construction of Railway No. 1 (the Waterhall Junction line) was obtained in the Llantrissant and Taff Vale Junction Railway (Extension of Time) Act 1877 (40 & 41 Vict. c. cxxxvii) and the intention was to return to Parliament the following year and apply for abandonment. In fact the negotiations on rate apportionment dragged on, and a further extension of time for construction of Railway No. 1 had to be obtained in 1880.

In 1880 however, the picture began to change; a new branch line, the Treferig Railway, was being planned and it might bring traffic to the line. The west curve at Common Branch Junction had been lifted, probably without ever having passed a train over it, and a new junction to the future Railway No. 1 was made. Nevertheless progress was very slow on the new line; the application to form Waterhall Junction was only submitted in 1886, and the line was opened on 11 September 1886.

Very little traffic used the new line; in 1910 the general manager of the TVR said:

"There is very little traffic on it and it need never have been constructed."

== The Treferig Railway ==
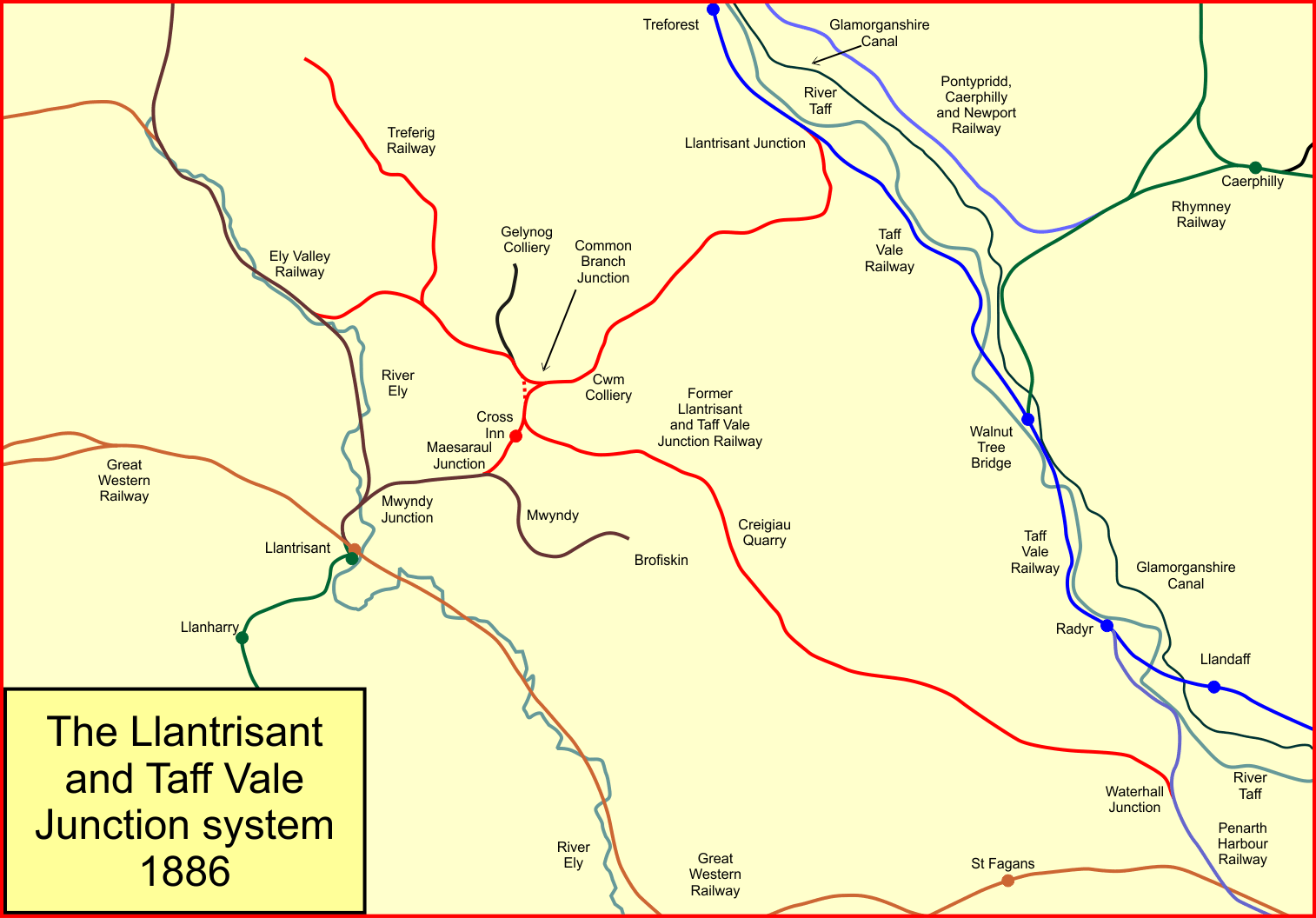
The system in 1886

Nant Mychydd extends north-westwards from Llantrisant Common, and appeared to have potential for mining coal, and in 1823 a primitive tramroad was built to convey the output to market. This project had only limited success, but in the mid-1870s Glyn Colliery was established near Tonyrefeil.

The proprietor and others in the valley promoted the Treferig Railway, which was to join the L&TVJR's Common Branch. A parliamentary bill was deposited in November 1878. As the line was close to the Ely Valley lines of the Great Western Railway (GWR), it became important to the TVR and the GWR to attract the new railway to their own group. This led to the bill being opposed in Parliament by both of the larger railways, but the Treferig promoters agreed to a clause in their bill banning discrimination in freight rates against either party. Accordingly the Treferig Valley Railway Act 1879 (42 & 43 Vict. c. clxvi) was passed on 21 July 1879, with capital of £15,000.

The Treferig Railway found it almost impossible to raise funds for its construction, and the TVR, thinking the line had potential, agreed to guarantee 4% on the line's capital. This was objected to by the GWR, but an accommodation was reached with them. The Treferig still found it difficult to get all the money it needed for the construction, and the TVR provided a loan. There was some urgency as a stockpile of coal was accumulating at Glyn Colliery, waiting for transport away. The steep gradients meant that trains were always propelled up the branch.

The line opened by 30 August 1883, (Note: Barrie says April 1883.) but although business was brisk (due to the Glyn backlog) the company still lacked money for ordinary operational purposes, and a lease to the TVR was discussed. The talks proved successful, and a lease was authorised by the Treferig Valley Railway (Lease) Act 1884 (47 & 48 Vict. c. cxxxix) of 14 July 1884, ratifying the effective date of 5 May 1884.

Full absorption was evidently sensible, and this was authorised the Taff Vale Railway (Amalgamation and Capital) Act 1889 (52 & 53 Vict. c. cxciii) of 26 August 1889; the takeover was effective from 1 July 1889. Glyn Colliery was the only significant development in the valley, and even its aspirations for expansion were in vain.

In 1892 the management of the Glyn Colliery on the Treferig branch approached the TVR, asking for a workmen's train service to be run by contract. This was operated from April 1892, without obtaining the sanction of the Board of Trade for passenger operation. The trains ran to and from Treferig Junction; there was no platform and the miners walked to and from Llantrisant, a mile away, though later the trains were extended to run from Common Road bridge.

In 1898 the miners' train derailed at Treferig and a passenger was injured; this brought the Board of Trade into the picture, but the feared (by the TVR) major enhancement of safety measures was not insisted on, when the TVR gave an assurance that the service would be run with proper regard to safety of the passengers.

== New passenger station and services ==
The thinly populated terrain through which the L&TVJR line passed had gradually been built up, and pressure arose for additional stations. This was generally resisted by the Taff Vale company, but on 1 October 1887 a new station at Church Village was opened.

In 1892 a moderate increase in the passenger service on the main line took place, with five trains each way; six ran each way from 1893.

== Common Branch Junction ==
The west curve of the triangle at Common Branch Junction had been abolished in the early days, never having seen much traffic. Now the mineral trains from Glyn Colliery to Penarth and Newport required the missing link: without it they had to be routed via Llantrisant Junction at Treforest. In late 1894 and again in 1898 it was proposed that the curve be reinstated, but this seems not have been done.

Chapman is ambiguous about this, page 49:

"[The TVR Traffic Manager] asked that facilities be provided at Common Branch Junction to enable trains to make use of the direct route. Nothing was done, however, until 12th June, 1894, when substantial alterations were authorised at Common Branch Junction…"

"These [alterations] involved the abolition of Common Branch Junction West, with Llantrisant No. 1 Railway being extended to run parallel to the main Llantrisant branch to Common Branch Junction East, where a new loop was provided."

The reference to Common Branch Junction West refers to the signal box at the Llantrisant apex; there was no physical junction there at this time. Llantrisant No. 1 Railway was the line from Waterhall Junction and Penarth; and "the main Llantrisant branch" really means the main line. Evidently the West Curve was not reinstated for Chapman says on page 81 that in 1898 the TVR:

"… accepted a recommendation to restore the west curve at Common Branch Junction, but, in the event, the new work was restricted to a dead-end siding off the Common branch, and the connection with the Llantrisant branch [that is, the main line] at the site of Common Branch Junction West was not restored."

== Motor cars (railmotors) ==
At the turn of the century the passenger stations on the main line were at Church Village, Llantwit and Cross Inn.

In 1903 the Taff Vale Railway experimented with what it called "motor cars"—railmotors, that is, single passenger coaches with an integrated small steam engine. The intention was to provide a passenger service in remote areas by setting up low-cost stopping places; these were generally 40-feet long timber platforms without shelter or any other facility. After trials on the Penarth branch the system was adopted throughout the TVR system, and from 1 May 1905 the motor cars operated most of the passenger services in an enhanced timetable between Pontypridd and Aberthaw, reversing at Llantrisant and continuing over the Cowbridge Railway and the Cowbridge and Aberthaw Railway. A new motor car platform was provided at Tonteg. The motor cars could not convey tail traffic so some conventional trains were run, but they could not call at the motor car platforms.

Beddau Platform was opened in July 1910, and both it and Tonteg were lengthened subsequently to allow two-coach conventional trains to call.

== From 1923 ==
The government passed the Railways Act 1921 which mandated the "grouping" of most of the railways of Great Britain into one or other of four new large companies. In fact in the area the Great Western Railway name continued; the old Great Western Railway was of course the largest constituent of it, but the Taff Vale Railway was a significant constituent company. Although the grouping is generally considered to have taken place at the beginning of 1923, the necessary negotiations resulted in the Taff Vale's transfer to the new GWR effective from January 1922.

In this period bus competition became exceptionally fierce and there was a catastrophic collapse of use of the passenger trains. At first this was not matched by service reductions. At the same time some of the largest collieries on the line closed, and although there was still considerable colliery activity, volumes reduced.

The upper end of the Trefreig branch had long been dormant, and it was successively cut back to Castellau siding by 1933, and closing completely in 1935. The eastern end of the Common Branch closed with it, leaving only a stub at the extreme western end, used as a wagon storage siding. (That closed on 1 July 1951.)

The Barry Railway had opened its line from Trehafod (in the Rhondda Valley) through its own station at Pontypridd, to Barry in 1889. Near Tonteg this line ran close to the former L&TVJR line from Llantrisant Junction (Treforest). The Great Western Railway took the opportunity to simplify the railway arrangements there: the Barry Railway line would be closed between Trehafod and Tonteg, and trains from Pontypridd would travel on a new connecting line between the TVR line and the Barry line. The old L&TVJR line would also be closed at this point, with the Llantrisant trains being routed over the new connection to Tonteg, there diverging from the Barry line. This connection was more gently graded at 1 in 69 than the 1 in 40 of the original. A new Tonteg Halt to replace the old one was built at the junction with the Barry line. Llantrisant line trains started to run on the new line from 5 May 1930; the Barry line trains transferred on 10 July 1930.

== From 1948 ==
On 1 January 1948 the network of the Great Western Railway passed into national ownership, under British Railways. Passenger business on the L&TVJR system was extremely poor, while the parallel bus service operated at a 30 minute frequency. With no prospect of a recovery, the passenger service was withdrawn from 31 March 1952. Porthcawl excursions ran over the line until 1959. In the following years the ordinary goods service collapsed also, being discontinued by 1964.

Only two sources of traffic now remained on the system: Creigiau Quarry, on Llantrisant No 1 Railway, served from Radyr via Waterhall Junction, and Cwm Colliery, served from Treforest. Common Branch Junction to Creigiau had no traffic and was closed from 17 June 1963.

A reorganisation of the mineral workings, now based on Llantrisant, resulted in Creigiau being served from there, with the Waterhall Junction end of that line now closing, and the western end being re-opened. These changes took place on 28 September 1964. Both the remaining branches were worked as long sidings.

The Creigiau line ceased to carry traffic on 31 January 1978, although it was held dormant until 1 January 1981. The final mineral train from Cwm Colliery ran on 2 March 1987, although an enthusiasts' special passenger train ran on the line on 11 April 1987. The railway use of the former Llantrisant and Taff Vale Junction Railway was at an end.

== Location list ==
Llantrisant and Taff Vale Junction Railway
Overview
- Locale: Wales
- Dates of operation: 1863–1964/1984

Technical
- Track gauge: 4 ft 8 1/2 in (1,435 mm)

- Treforest Junction; divergence from Pontypridd to Taffs Well line;
- Church Village; opened 1 October 1887; later renamed Church Village Halt; closed 31 March 1952;
- Llantwit; opened January 1867; renamed Llantwit Fardre 1936; closed 31 March 1952;
- Beddau Platform; opened by July 1910; renamed Beddau Halt 1923; closed 31 March 1952;
- Common Branch Junctions; triangle to Treferig Branch and divergence of Llantrisant No 1 Branch;
- Cross Inn; opened 6 September 1869; closed 31 March 1952;
- Maesaraul Junction; convergence with Ely Valley Railway;
- [Llantrisant].
