= Maesteg railway station =

TfW railway station in Bridgend County Borough, Wales

Maesteg
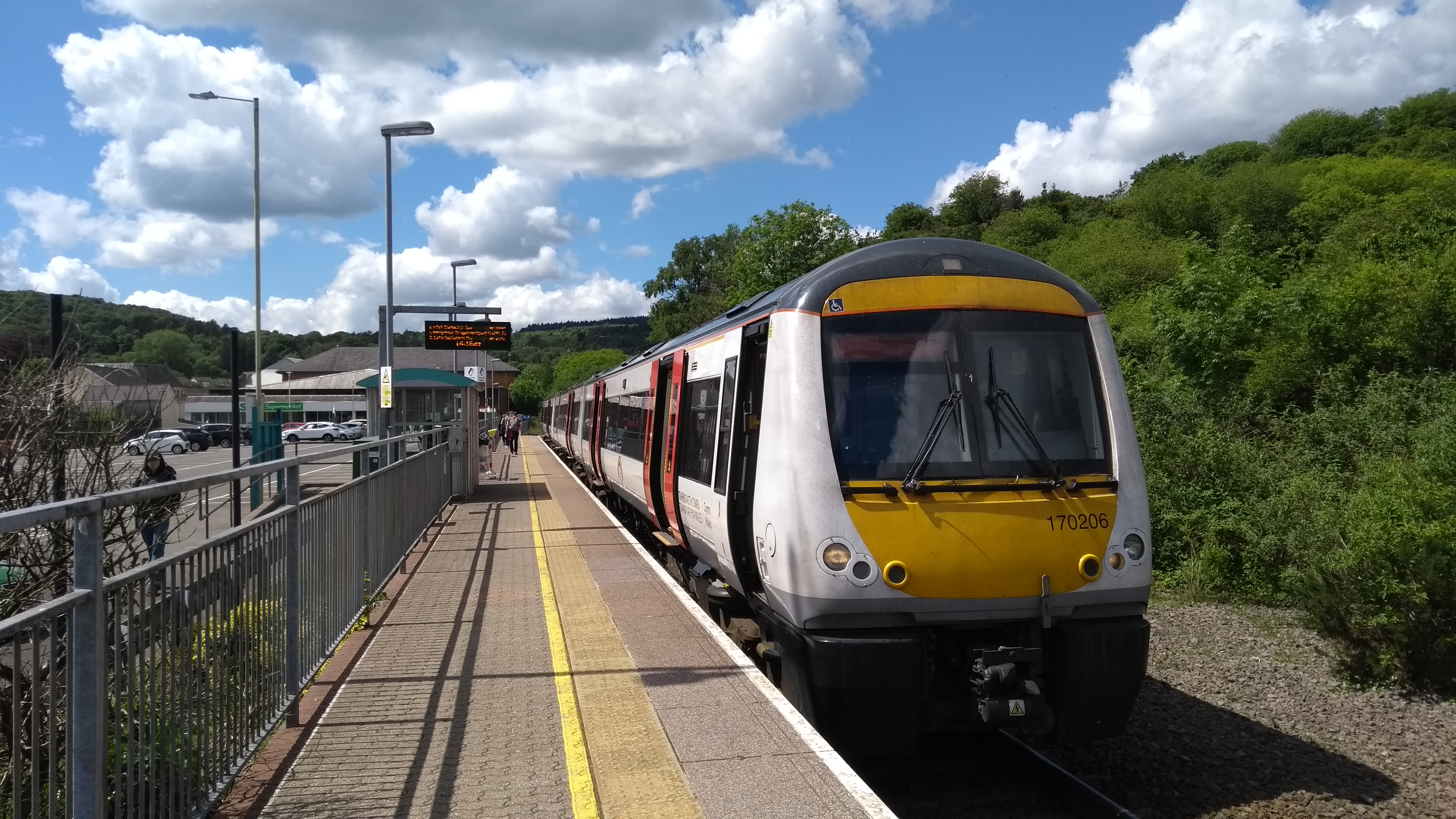

General information
- Location: Maesteg, Bridgend; Wales
- Coordinates: 51.6096°N 3.6547°W
- Grid reference: SS855913
- Manager: Transport for Wales Rail
- Platforms: 1

Other information
- Station code: MST
- Classification: DfT category F1

History
- Opened: 1992

Key dates
- 25 February 1864: Opened
- 1 July 1924: Name changed to Maesteg Castle Street
- 6 May 1968: Name changed to Maesteg
- 22 June 1970: Closed to public
- 14 July 1970: Last school train
- 28 September 1992: Reopened by British Rail
- 2008: Platform lengthened to accommodate 4 car trains.

Passengers
- 2021/22: ▲0.107 million
- 2022/23: ▲0.142 million
- 2023/24: ▲0.154 million
- 2024/25: ▲0.156 million
- 2025/26: ▲0.174 million
Location
Notes
- Passenger statistics from the Office of Rail and Road

Maesteg railway station is one of two railway stations that serves the town of Maesteg in Wales. The British Rail 1992 built station is located in the centre of the town, adjacent to the Asda Supermarket store and on former sidings 8 1/4 miles (13.3 km) north of Bridgend. Passenger services are operated by Transport for Wales.

== History ==
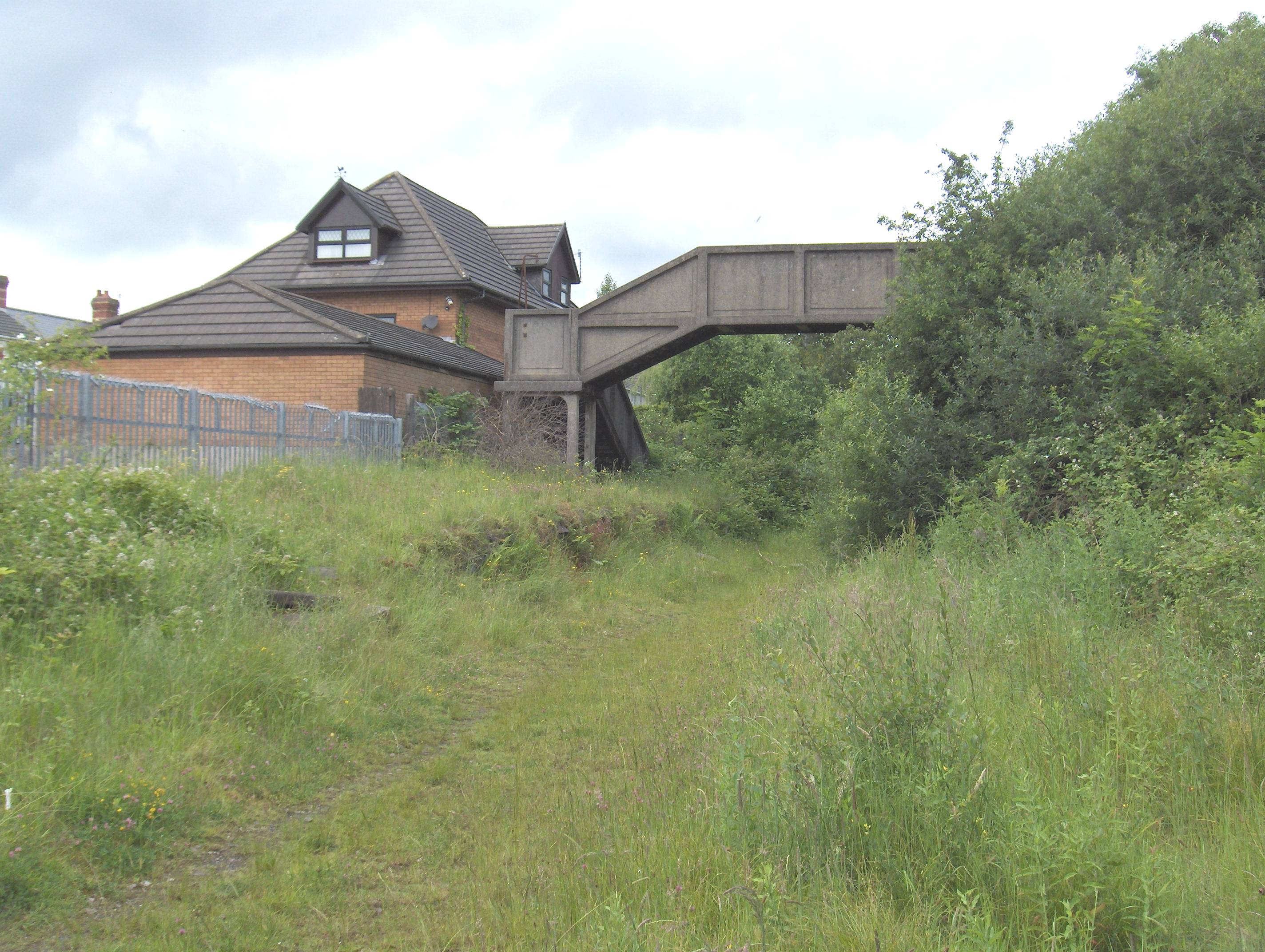
The footbridge of the old Castle Street station, a few hundred yards further up the line.

The station is now the terminus of the Maesteg Line from Cardiff via Bridgend. Previously the line continued northbound through the old Maesteg Castle Street railway station (opened in 1864), which closed with the withdrawal of passenger services in 1970. Mineral traffic had continued to several collieries in the areas until November 1985 (with the route remaining open past Llynfi North Junction as far north as Nantyffyllon to serve the NCB Maesteg Central Washery as well as the three pits) but the closure of the last remaining mine at St John's and the washery saw the line fall into disuse traffic ceasing in 1993.

The former station platforms and footbridge still exist, although the track has now been removed and there is heavy tree and plant growth at the location.

== Facilities ==
The station is unstaffed and has a single platform with waiting shelter, CIS display, customer help point, timetable information board and self-service ticket machine next to the main entrance. The latter can be used for collecting pre-paid tickets as well as for purchasing tickets prior to travel. Level access is available between the car park and platform. The platform was lengthened in 2008 to allow four-car trains to operate busier services. This was funded by the Welsh Assembly Government and the European Union.

== Services ==
The general service pattern is one train per hour to Cardiff Central via Bridgend, with most trains extended to Ebbw Vale town as of December 2024. This service is reduced to a mostly 2-hourly service on Sundays. but these often only run to Cardiff Central

Preceding station	National Rail	Following station
Maesteg (Ewenny Road)	Transport for Wales; Maesteg Line	Terminus
	Disused railways	
Nantyffyllon	Great Western Railway; Llynvi and Ogmore Railway	Garth
