= Maesteg Line =

Commuter rail line in South Wales

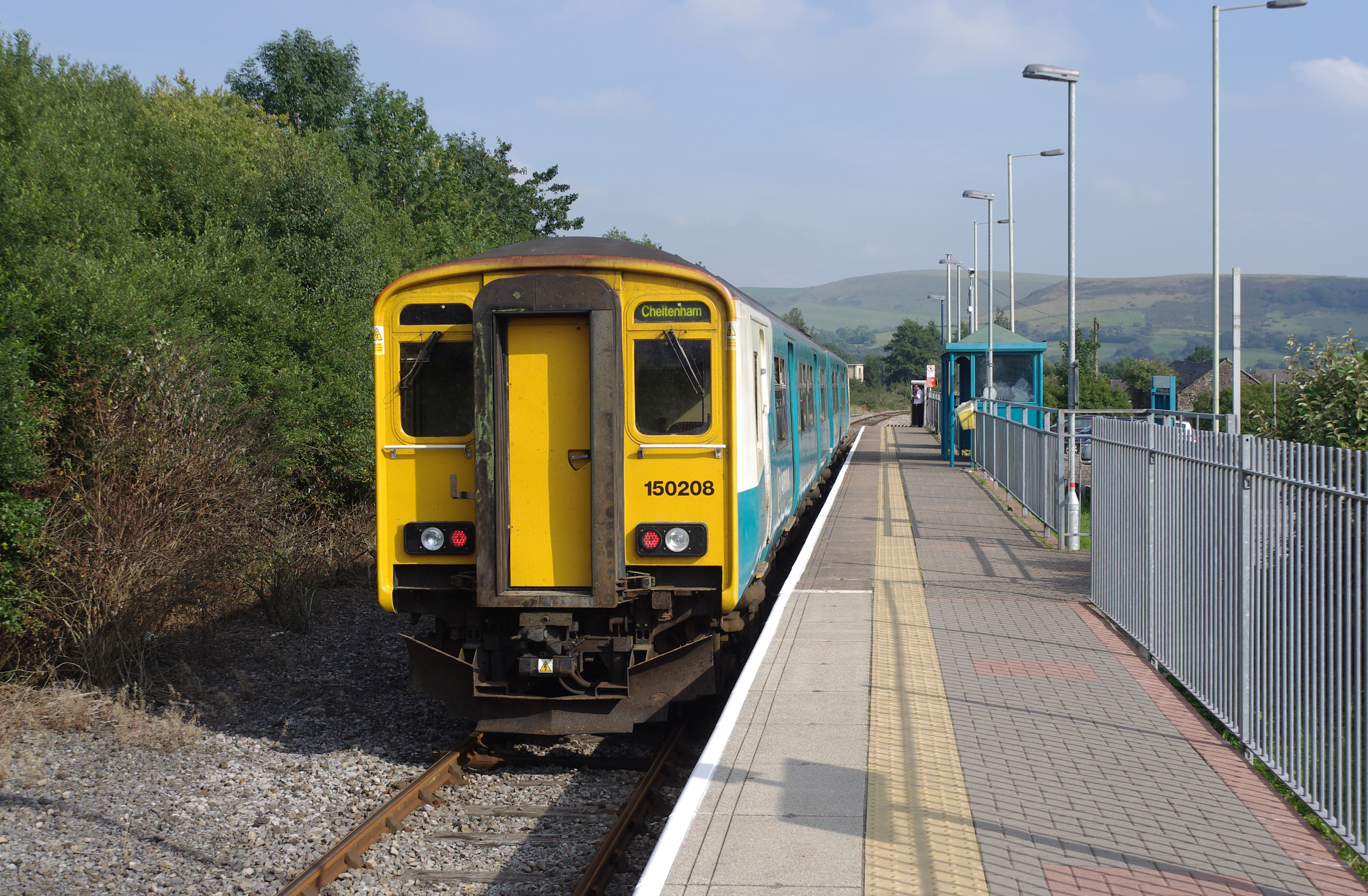
- An Arriva Trains Wales Class 150 stands at Maesteg with a terminating service from Cheltenham

Overview
- Owner: Network Rail
- Locale: Bridgend County Borough
- Termini: Bridgend; Maesteg
- Stations: 7

Service
- Type: Heavy rail
- System: National Rail
- Operator(s): Transport for Wales Rail
- Rolling stock: Class 150, Class 153, Class 158, Class 197

History
- Opened: 28 June 1866; 159 years ago

Technical
- Line length: 8 miles 29 chains (13.5 km)
- Number of tracks: Single track
- Track gauge: 4 ft 8 1/2 in (1,435 mm) standard gauge
- Electrification: None
Route map
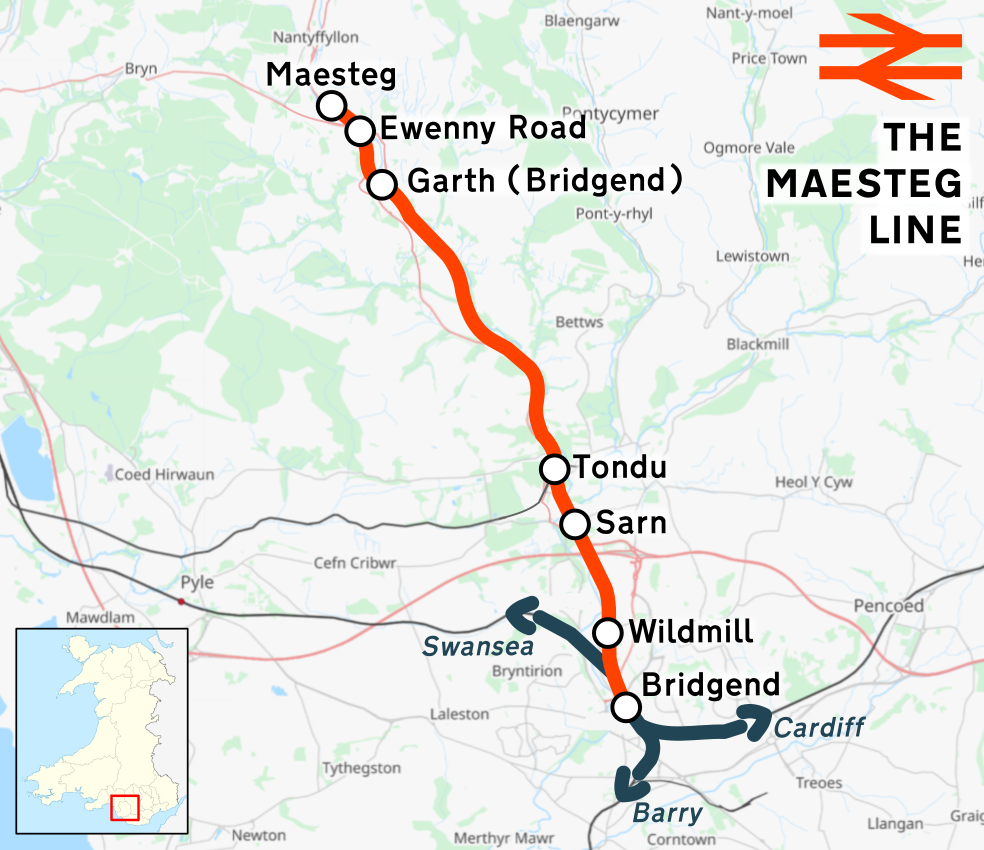
(Click to expand)

The Maesteg Line is a commuter rail line in South Wales from Bridgend to Maesteg. Services usually operate hourly from Maesteg to Ebbw Vale Town via Cardiff Central, using the South Wales Main Line, followed by the Ebbw Valley Railway.

Electrification by 2019 was announced in the Department for Transport's High Level Output Specification of 2012, but later cancelled.

== History ==
The Llynfi and Ogmore Railway (L&OVR) was formed on 28 June 1866 (itself the amalgamation of earlier lines); a standard gauge line as opposed to the main line. On 1 July 1873 the GWR took over the L&OVR.

The line from Bridgend originally operated beyond Maesteg through Caerau and the Cymmer Tunnel, known locally as the 'Gwdihw', to passenger stations in Cymmer, known as Cymmer General and further to Abergwynfi. The lines also connected collieries in Abergwynfi and Glyncorrwg. Junctions at both Tondu and Cymmer connected with east–west routes across the Llynfi and Afan valleys.

The Maesteg branch was closed to passenger trains in 1970 (though it remained in use for coal traffic until 1993), and the link with the Afan Valley was lost due to the closure of the Cymmer Tunnel.

A long campaign in the late 1980s and early 90s, resulted in the reopening of the line in 1992 as far as Maesteg by British Rail and Mid Glamorgan County Council. The new stations and line were officially opened by Prince Richard, Duke of Gloucester and a plaque was unveiled at Maesteg station.

The railway north of Maesteg continued to exist until 2004, however it was removed as part of the Maesteg Washery reclamation scheme. The track to the north of Llynfi North Junction, including the former Nantyffyllon and Caerau stations, have been part of a major housing developments. Reconnection with Cymmer (Afan Valley) is financially unviable to reinstate;– the tunnel portal is still visible at the Caerau end but it is completely buried at the Cymmer end.

Since 2021, the line has been operated by Transport for Wales Rail. Since December 2024, the regular service pattern has consisted of an hourly service to and from Ebbw Vale Town to Maesteg via Cardiff Central and Bridgend, as part of the Valley Lines network. The services are usually operated using Class 197 Trains on the line along with the soon to be phased out British Rail Class 150, Class 153 and Class 158 DMUs. but it is expected that eventually services on the line will be operated using Class 231 FLIRT units. However. before December 2024, the service typically ran to and from Cheltenham Spa via Newport and Gloucester; these services now terminate at Cardiff Central. TfW Rail replaced the previous franchises Keolis Amey Wales, who ran the service from 2018 to 2021, Arriva Trains Wales who ran the service from 2003 to 2018 and Wales & Borders who operated the service until 2003.
