= Garth =

Garth may refer to:

== Places ==
=== Canada ===
- Garth, Alberta

=== United Kingdom ===
- Garth, Bridgend, a village in south Wales

- Garth railway station (Bridgend)

- Garth, Ceredigion, small village in Wales
- Garth, Treflys, Powys, a village in mid-Wales
  - Garth railway station (Powys)
- Garth, Knighton, Powys, a former village now incorporated into the town of Knighton, in east-central Wales on the border with Shropshire, England
- Garth Hill, the Garth, or Garth Mountain, a mountain near Cardiff, Wales
- Garth, one of many other minor place names in the United Kingdom

=== United States ===
- Garth, Michigan, an unincorporated community

== Buildings and structures ==
=== United Kingdom ===
- Garth (Guilsfield), a historic house and estate in Montgomeryshire, Powys, north-east Wales; also known as the Garth
- Castle Garth, a medieval fortification in Newcastle upon Tyne, England
- Garth Pier, a Grade II listed structure in Bangor, Gwynedd, north Wales
- Garth Castle, home to Clan Stewart of Atholl, north-west of Aberfeldy, Scotland
- The Garth, former school building on Marygate in York

== Arts and entertainment ==
- Garth (comic strip), published in the British newspaper Daily Mirror from 1943 to 1997
- Planet Garth, setting of David Brin's novel The Uplift War

== People and fictional characters ==
- Garth (name), a list of people and fictional characters with the given name, nickname or surname
- Garth (comics), a DC Comics superhero
- Sir Charles Lloyd, 1st Baronet, of Garth (died c. 1678), Welsh merchant and politician
- Sir John Edwards, 1st Baronet, of Garth (1770–1850), British Member of Parliament

== Other uses ==
- HMS Garth (L20), a Royal Navy destroyer
- Garth (architecture), a cloister garden of a medieval monastery
- Garth Stadium, a former greyhound racing track in Taff's Well, near Cardiff, Wales
- HM Prison Garth, a prison in Lancashire
- Garth School, Georgetown, Kentucky, United States

== See also ==
- John MacDonald of Garth (1771–1866), Canadian fur trader
- Garth-eryr, Site of Special Scientific Interest near Llangedwyn in Powys, Wales
- Gwaelod-y-Garth, a village in the parish of Pentyrch, Cardiff, Wales
- Rhos-y-garth, hamlet in Ceredigion, Wales
