= List of United Kingdom locations: Gao-Gar =

The United Kingdom

This is part of the list of United Kingdom locations: a gazetteer of place names in the United Kingdom showing each place's locality and geographical coordinates.

== Ga (continued) ==
=== Gao-Gar ===
Location	Locality	Coordinates (links to map & photo sources)	OS grid reference
Gappah	Devon	50.58°N 03.61°W	SX8677
Garbhallt	Argyll and Bute	56.11°N 05.18°W	NS0296
Garbh Allt Shiel	Aberdeenshire	56.99°N 03.33°W	NO1990
Garbh Eilean	Western Isles	57.47°N 07.19°W	NF887550
Garbh Eilean	Highland	57.69°N 05.50°W	NG914723
Garbh Lingay	Western Isles	57.00°N 07.36°W	NF743033
Garboldisham	Norfolk	52.39°N 00.93°E	TM0081
Garden City	Blaenau Gwent	51.75°N 03.21°W	SO1607
Garden City	Flintshire	53.21°N 03.01°W	SJ3269
Gardeners Green	Berkshire	51.38°N 00.82°W	SU8266
Gardenstown	Aberdeenshire	57.66°N 02.33°W	NJ8064
Garden Village	Swansea	51.65°N 04.03°W	SS5997
Garden Village	Leeds	53.78°N 01.33°W	SE4432
Garden Village	Sheffield	53.47°N 01.60°W	SK2698
Garden Village	Wrexham	53.06°N 03.00°W	SJ3352
Garderhouse	Shetland Islands	60.21°N 01.40°W	HU3348
Gardham	East Riding of Yorkshire	53.87°N 00.55°W	SE9542
Gardie (Yell)	Shetland Islands	60.60°N 01.08°W	HU5091
Gardie (Unst)	Shetland Islands	60.77°N 00.86°W	HP6211
Gare Hill	Wiltshire	51.15°N 02.31°W	ST7840
Garelochhead	Argyll and Bute	56.07°N 04.84°W	NS2391
Garey	Isle of Man	54.32°N 04.43°W	SC4295
Garford	Oxfordshire	51.66°N 01.39°W	SU4296
Garforth	Leeds	53.78°N 01.37°W	SE4132
Gargrave	North Yorkshire	53.98°N 02.10°W	SD9354
Gargunnock	Stirling	56.12°N 04.09°W	NS7094
Gariob	Argyll and Bute	56.04°N 05.56°W	NR7889
Gariochsford	Aberdeenshire	57.44°N 02.56°W	NJ6640
Garizim / Gerizim	Conwy	53.25°N 03.96°W	SH6975
Garker	Cornwall	50.35°N 04.75°W	SX0454
Garlandhayes	Devon	50.92°N 03.18°W	ST1715
Garlands	Cumbria	54.87°N 02.88°W	NY4354
Garleffin	South Ayrshire	55.08°N 05.01°W	NX0881
Garlic Street	Norfolk	52.40°N 01.24°E	TM2183
Garlieston	Dumfries and Galloway	54.78°N 04.36°W	NX4846
Garliford	Devon	51.01°N 03.78°W	SS7525
Garlinge	Kent	51.37°N 01.34°E	TR3369
Garlinge Green	Kent	51.22°N 01.02°E	TR1152
Garmelow	Staffordshire	52.84°N 02.31°W	SJ7927
Garmond	Aberdeenshire	57.55°N 02.33°W	NJ8052
Garmondsway	Durham	54.70°N 01.48°W	NZ3334
Garmouth	Moray	57.66°N 03.12°W	NJ3364
Garmston	Shropshire	52.65°N 02.59°W	SJ6006
Garn	Powys	52.41°N 03.32°W	SO1081
Garnant	Carmarthenshire	51.80°N 03.91°W	SN6813
Garndiffaith	Torfaen	51.73°N 03.07°W	SO2604
Garndolbenmaen	Gwynedd	52.97°N 04.25°W	SH4944
Garnett Bridge	Cumbria	54.38°N 02.74°W	SD5299
Garnetts	Essex	51.82°N 00.36°E	TL6317
Garnfadryn	Gwynedd	52.87°N 04.55°W	SH2834
Garnkirk	City of Glasgow	55.88°N 04.12°W	NS6768
Garnlydan	Blaenau Gwent	51.80°N 03.21°W	SO1612
Garnsgate	Lincolnshire	52.77°N 00.08°E	TF4122
Garn-swllt	Swansea	51.76°N 04.00°W	SN6209
Garn-yr-erw	Torfaen	51.78°N 03.11°W	SO2310
Garrabost	Western Isles	58.21°N 06.25°W	NB5033
Garrachan	Highland	57.42°N 06.60°W	NG2447
Garrafad	Highland	57.62°N 06.20°W	NG4967
Garras	Cornwall	50.06°N 05.21°W	SW7023
Garreg	Flintshire	53.28°N 03.30°W	SJ1377
Garreg	Gwynedd	52.94°N 04.07°W	SH6141
Garret's Green	Birmingham	52.46°N 01.79°W	SP1485
Garrigill	Cumbria	54.76°N 02.40°W	NY7441
Garriston	North Yorkshire	54.32°N 01.77°W	SE1592
Garroch Head	Argyll and Bute	55.72°N 05.03°W	NS097522
Garrochtrie	Dumfries and Galloway	54.70°N 04.93°W	NX1138
Garros	Highland	57.58°N 06.20°W	NG4963
Garrowby	East Riding of Yorkshire	54.01°N 00.79°W	SE7957
Garrowhill	City of Glasgow	55.85°N 04.12°W	NS6764
Garrygall	Western Isles	56.95°N 07.48°W	NL6798
Garrygualach	Highland	57.05°N 05.01°W	NH1700
Garrynamonie	Western Isles	57.11°N 07.38°W	NF7416
Garsdale	Cumbria	54.29°N 02.40°W	SD7489
Garsdale Head	Cumbria	54.32°N 02.33°W	SD7892
Garsdon	Wiltshire	51.58°N 02.05°W	ST9687
Garshall Green	Staffordshire	52.90°N 02.06°W	SJ9634
Garsington	Oxfordshire	51.71°N 01.16°W	SP5802
Garstang	Lancashire	53.89°N 02.77°W	SD4945
Garston	Hertfordshire	51.67°N 00.39°W	TQ1199
Garston	Liverpool	53.34°N 02.90°W	SJ4084
Garswood	St Helens	53.48°N 02.67°W	SJ5599
Gartcosh	North Lanarkshire	55.88°N 04.09°W	NS6968
Garth	Bridgend	51.59°N 03.64°W	SS8690
Garth	Ceredigion	52.43°N 04.00°W	SN6484
Garth	Monmouthshire	51.62°N 02.95°W	ST3492
Garth	City of Newport	51.57°N 03.06°W	ST2687
Garth (Knighton)	Powys	52.34°N 03.07°W	SO2772
Garth (Treflys)	Powys	52.12°N 03.53°W	SN9549
Garth	Shetland Islands	60.26°N 01.15°W	HU4754
Garth	Flintshire	53.31°N 03.30°W	SJ1381
Garth	Denbighshire	52.97°N 03.11°W	SJ2542
Garth	Gwynedd	53.23°N 04.12°W	SH5873
Garthamlock	City of Glasgow	55.86°N 04.14°W	NS6666
Garthbrengy	Powys	51.98°N 03.39°W	SO0433
Garthdee	City of Aberdeen	57.11°N 02.15°W	NJ9103
Garthorpe	North Lincolnshire	53.66°N 00.73°W	SE8419
Garthorpe	Leicestershire	52.77°N 00.77°W	SK8320
Garth Owen	Powys	52.50°N 03.32°W	SO1090
Garth Row	Cumbria	54.36°N 02.74°W	SD5297
Garth Trevor	Denbighshire	52.97°N 03.10°W	SJ2642
Gartlea	North Lanarkshire	55.85°N 03.98°W	NS7664
Gartloch	City of Glasgow	55.87°N 04.11°W	NS6867
Gartly	Aberdeenshire	57.37°N 02.79°W	NJ5232
Gartmore	Stirling	56.14°N 04.38°W	NS5297
Gartnagrenach	Argyll and Bute	55.77°N 05.52°W	NR7959
Gartness	North Lanarkshire	55.85°N 03.95°W	NS7864
Gartness	Stirling	56.04°N 04.40°W	NS5086
Gartocharn	West Dunbartonshire	56.04°N 04.53°W	NS4286
Garton	East Riding of Yorkshire	53.79°N 00.08°W	TA2635
Garton on the Wolds	East Riding of Yorkshire	54.01°N 00.50°W	SE9859
Gartsherrie	North Lanarkshire	55.87°N 04.06°W	NS7166
Gartymore	Highland	58.10°N 03.68°W	ND0114
Garvald	East Lothian	55.92°N 02.67°W	NT5870
Garvald	South Lanarkshire	55.72°N 03.45°W	NT0949
Garvard	Argyll and Bute	56.03°N 06.24°W	NR3691
Garve	Highland	57.61°N 04.69°W	NH3961
Garvellachs	Argyll and Bute	56.23°N 05.78°W	NM656111
Garvestone	Norfolk	52.62°N 00.98°E	TG0207
Garvie	Argyll and Bute	56.06°N 05.16°W	NS0390
Garvock	Aberdeenshire	56.82°N 02.42°W	NO7470
Garvock Hill	Fife	56.06°N 03.44°W	NT1087
Garway	Herefordshire	51.89°N 02.78°W	SO4622
Garway Hill	Herefordshire	51.92°N 02.81°W	SO4425
