= Hudson Way =

10-mile footpath in northern England

The Hudson Way
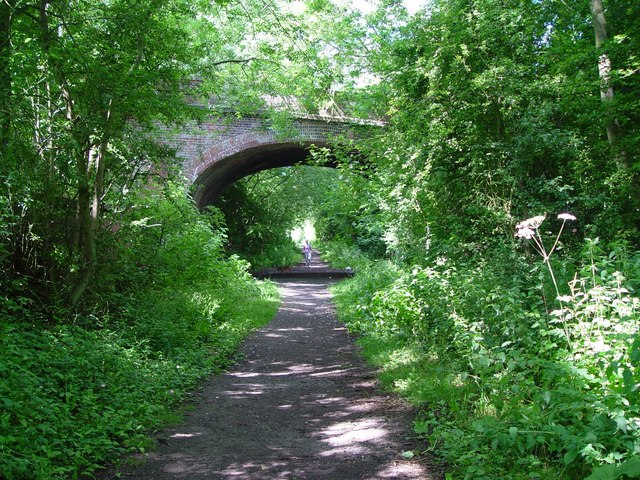
- Red Lane Bridge over the Hudson Way
- Length: 10.3 mi (16.6 km)
- Location: East Riding of Yorkshire, England
- Trailheads: Market Weighton; 53.865447°N 0.668220°W; Beverley; 53.848551°N 0.438252°W
- Use: Hiking
- Highest point: 60 ft (18 m)
- Difficulty: Very Easy
- Hazards: Road crossing

The Hudson Way is a 10 miles (16 km) walking and cycling route in the East Riding of Yorkshire, England. The route follows a disused railway line between the market towns of Market Weighton and Beverley.

== History ==
The path follows the route of the York to Beverley Line that was opened in 1865 and later connected at Beverley Junction to the Hull to Scarborough Line to provide a direct route between York and Kingston upon Hull. The line closed in 1965 as part of the Beeching report. The route is named after George Hudson, the railway engineer who built the first part of the line between York and Market Weighton, before his downfall.

== Route ==
The route can be walked from either direction. From Market Weighton Market Place car park, the route goes up Londesborough Road and Hall Road until it reaches the signposted disused rail track. The path crosses a minor road that is used by the Yorkshire Wolds Way at Rifle Butts Quarry. This area is part of a nature reserve managed by the Yorkshire Wildlife Trust and a site of international geological importance. Just a short way along the track is another Yorkshire Wildlife Trust Nature Reserve at Kiplingcotes Chalk Pit. Around the bend in the track is the old Kiplingcotes station building, platforms and signal box that still survive unaltered, as does the station master's house. The track passes to the north of the hamlet of Gardham and continues past the village of Cherry Burton. Originally walkers could traverse the bridge over the B1248 road on the approach to Cherry Burton Station but the bridge has now been demolished. After passing under the A164 road, the track ends at the pedestrian bridge over the A1035 on the outskirts of Beverley. The path continues into Beverley, where it meets the Minster Way, ending just short of where the old rail junction used to be.

== Images ==
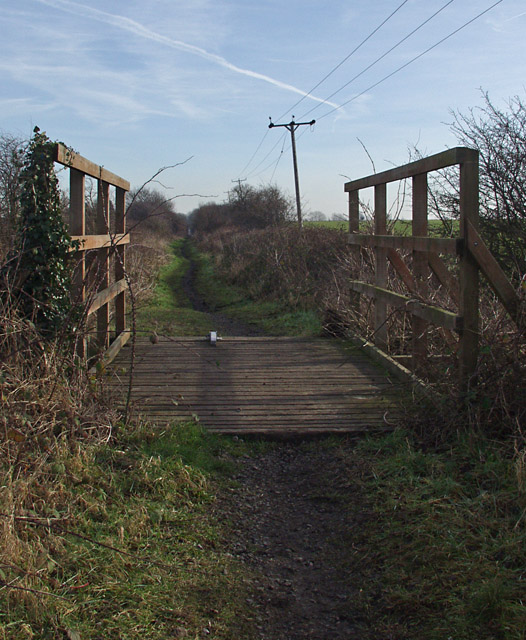
Hudson Way footbridge

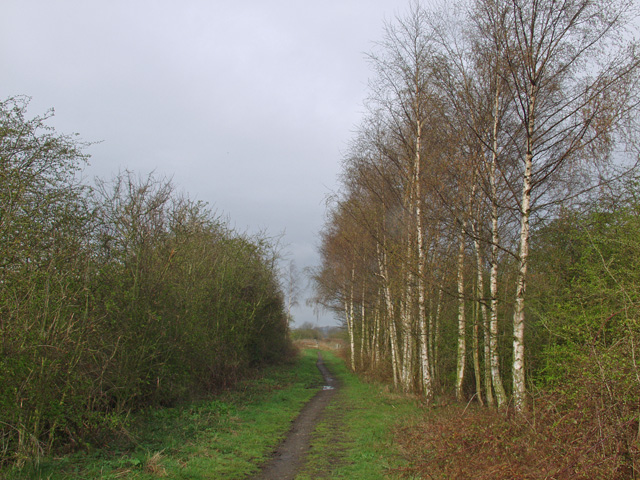
The Hudson Way, near Gardham

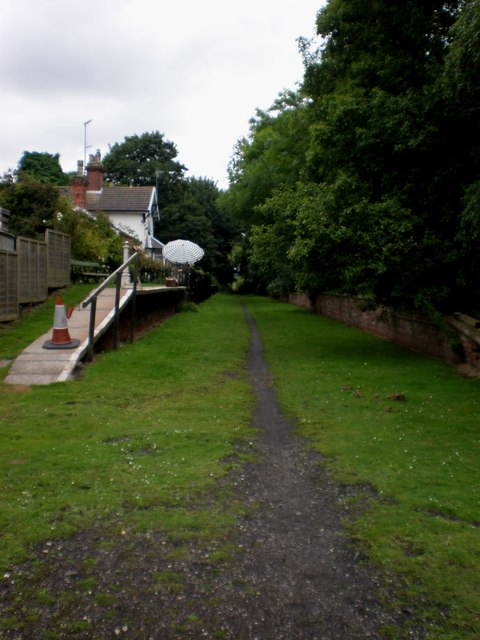
The Hudson Way at Kiplingcotes

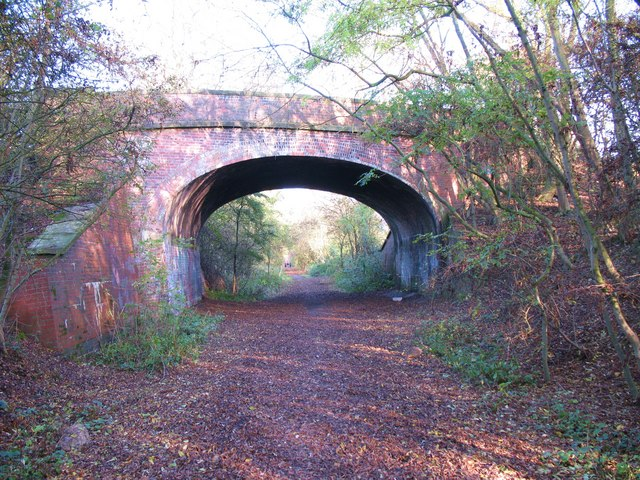
Bridge over the Hudson Way

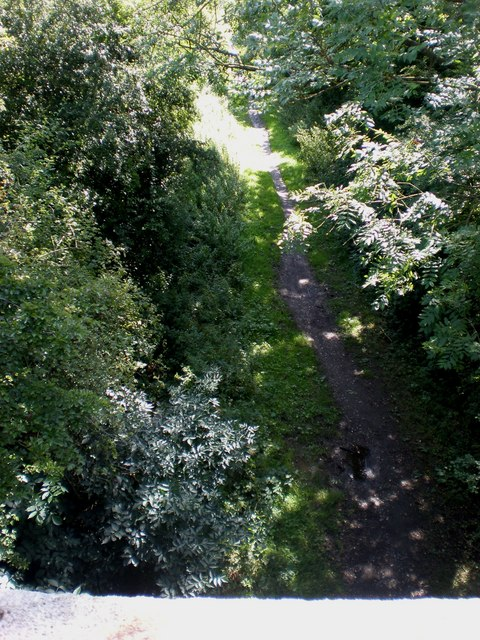
Looking down on the Hudson Way near Cherry Burton
