= Listed buildings in Cherry Burton =

Cherry Burton is a civil parish in the county of the East Riding of Yorkshire, England. It contains seven listed buildings that are recorded in the National Heritage List for England. All the listed buildings are designated at Grade II, the lowest of the three grades, which is applied to "buildings of national importance and special interest". The parish contains the village of Cherry Burton and the surrounding countryside. All the listed buildings are in the parish, and consist of houses and a church.

== Buildings ==
| Name and location | Photograph | Date | Notes |
|---|---|---|---|
| Highgate Farmhouse; 53.86462°N 0.50176°W | — | Mid-18th century | The house is in colourwashed red brick, with a dentilled brick eaves cornice, and a pantile roof with raised coped gables with on shaped stone kneelers. There are two storeys and three bays. The central doorway has a rectangular fanlight, and the windows are sashes under flat gauged brick arches. |
| 2, 4 and 6 Main Street; 53.86596°N 0.49939°W | | Late 18th century | A terrace of three houses in red brick, with a stepped brick eaves cornice, and a pantile roof with raised coped gables on shaped stone kneelers. There are two storeys and four bays. The doorways have rectangular fanlights, the windows are sashes, and all the openings are under flat gauged brick arches. |
| Park Farmhouse; 53.86624°N 0.49719°W | | Late 18th century | The house is in red brick, with a dentilled brick eaves cornice, and a double-span pantile roof with tumbled-in brickwork on the gable ends. There are two storeys, three bays, and a lower parallel rear range. The central doorway has pilasters and a fanlight, and the windows are sashes. The ground floor openings are under segmental gauged brick arches, and on the upper floor the windows have flat gauged brick arches. |
| The Old School House; 53.86587°N 0.49976°W | | Late 18th century | The house is in brown brick, with a dentilled brick eaves cornice, and a pantile roof, hipped on the left, and with tumbled-in brickwork on the right gable end. The doorway has a divided rectangular fanlight and the windows are sashes. The ground floor openings are under cambered gauged brick arches. |
| Elmtree Farmhouse; 53.86610°N 0.50006°W | — | Early 19th century | The house is in brown brick with a hipped slate roof. There are two storeys and three bays. The doorway has pilasters, and the windows are sashes under cambered wedge lintels. |
| Cherry Burton House; 53.86533°N 0.49065°W | — | 1829 | The house is in light brown brick, with a floor band, a low parapet, and hipped slate roofs. The main block has two storeys and five bays, there is a recessed three-storey two-bay wing to the right, and a single-storey three-bay wing further to the right. In the centre of the main block is a tetrastyle Ionic portico, and a doorway with a fanlight and side windows. The windows in all parts are sashes, some with flat gauged brick arches, and others under segmental gauged brick arches. |
| St Michael's Church; 53.86438°N 0.49162°W | | 1852–53 | The church is in sandstone, with limestone dressings and slate roofs. It consists of a nave with a clerestory, a north aisle, a north porch, a chancel with a south vestry, and a west tower. The tower has three stages, a moulded plinth, buttresses, a northwest octagonal stair turret, a trefoil-headed window, a clock face, a string course, two-light pointed bell openings with hood moulds, a ball flower cornice, and an embattled parapet. |
