= Cherry Burton =

Village and civil parish in the East Riding of Yorkshire, England

Coordinates: 53°51′54″N 0°29′48″W

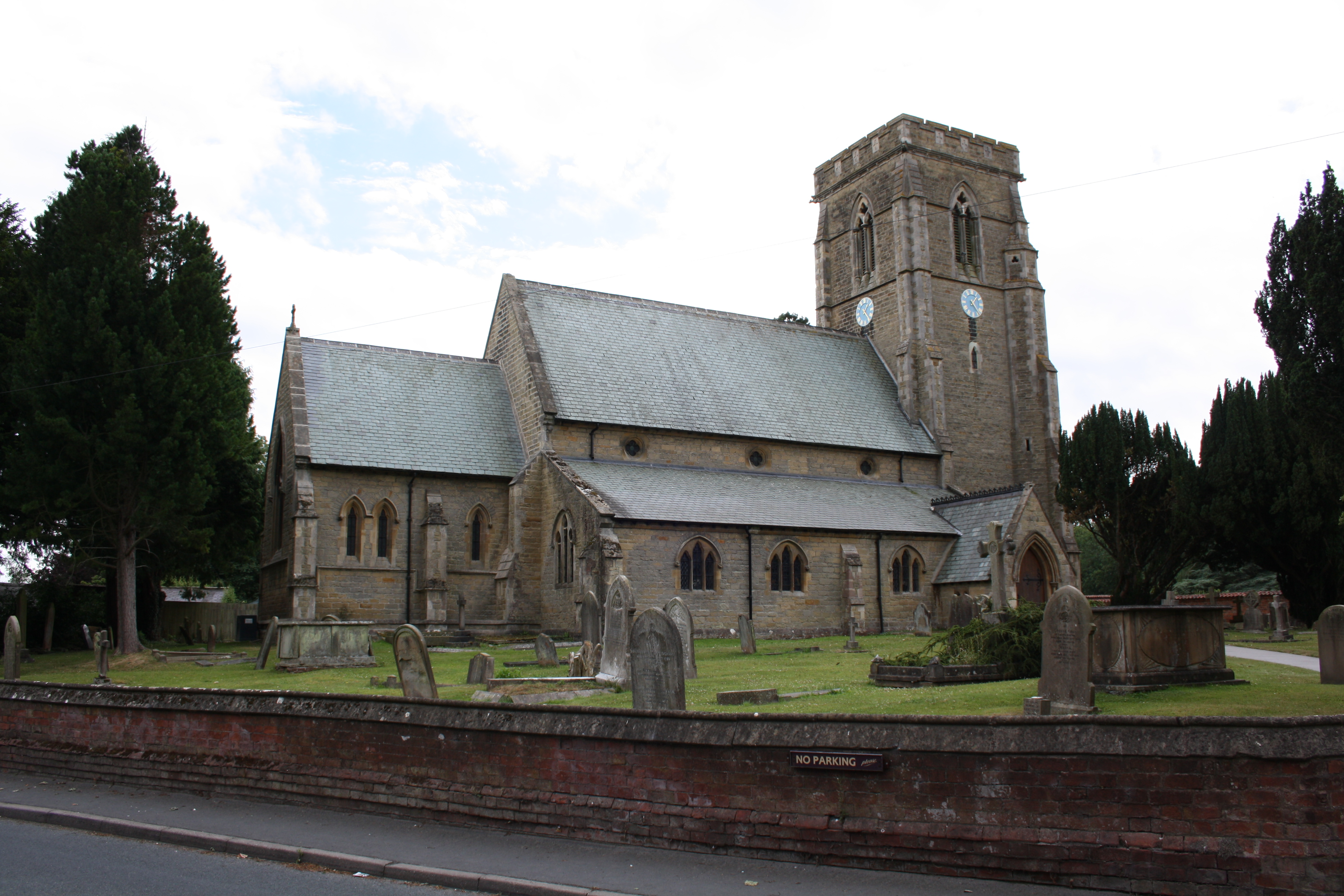
- St Michael and All Angels Church

- Location within the East Riding of Yorkshire
- Population: 1,392 (2011 census)
- OS grid reference: SE989420
  - London: 165 mi (266 km) S
- Civil parish: Cherry Burton
- Unitary authority: East Riding of Yorkshire
- Ceremonial county: East Riding of Yorkshire
- Region: Yorkshire and the Humber
- Country: England
- Sovereign state: United Kingdom
- Post town: BEVERLEY
- Postcode district: HU17
- Dialling code: 01964
- Police: Humberside
- Fire: Humberside
- Ambulance: Yorkshire
- UK Parliament: Beverley and Holderness

Cherry Burton is a village and civil parish in the East Riding of Yorkshire, England. It is approximately 3 miles (5 km) north-west of the market town of Beverley, 9 miles (14 km) east of Market Weighton and 11 miles (18 km) south west of Driffield. The village lies on the eastern edge of the Yorkshire Wolds and lies to the west of the B1248 road.

== History ==
The village is mentioned in the Domesday Book as Burtone, and belonging to the then Archbishop of York. The name derives from a combination of Old and Middle English; Burh-tūn and Chiri, which means a fort enclosure; a farm with a palisade and a cherry tree. Due to its location, some 1.2 miles (2 km) north of Bishop Burton, the village was sometimes known as North Burton (or even rarer, as Sheriff Burton).

Historically in the Wapentake of Harthill, the village also came under the Beverley for its local district. Until rapid housebuilding in the 1960s and 1970s, the village mostly consisted of one long main street as laid down in the 18th and 19th centuries with farmhouses.

The civil parish is formed by the village of Cherry Burton and the hamlets of Gardham and High Gardham. According to the 2011 UK Census, Cherry Burton parish had a population of 1,392, a reduction on the 2001 UK Census figure of 1,473.

The village has a Costcutter shop which also acts as a post office and a village hall which holds live musical events and hosts an annual local pantomime. The village pub, The Bay Horse, holds events each week. The village has a primary school which has ties with the local church. Its rating by OFSTED is good.

Sports in the village include cricket, football, tennis, and rounders. Clubs for cricket and football have junior sections. Just outside of the village is a golf course and leisure park currently under development. A Wesleyan Methodist chapel was built in 1824, followed by a Primitive Wesleyan Methodist chapel in 1851; both have ceased being used for worship with the Wesleyan chapel now being the village hall. St Michael's Church, Cherry Burton was built in 1852, which is now grade II listed. It was built on the site of a previous undated church.

The village is one of the few in the UK awarded Fairtrade Village status for promoting fairtrade and local produce. It gained this status on 22 July 2003 and was the second village to do so. In 2011–2012, a flood alleviation scheme was implemented with funding from DEFRA. Like many other places in the East Riding of Yorkshire, Cherry Burton was subject to severe flooding in the 2007 floods.

Cherry Burton was served by Cherry Burton railway station on the York to Beverley Line between 1865 and 1959, with the station remaining open for another five years for the inward and outward transportation of agricultural produce. The line closed completely in 1965. In 2018, a new footpath from the village to the old railway line opened, which allowed the inhabitants of Cherry Burton to access the Hudson Way, a foot and cycle path built on the formation of the old railway line. Previous to this, to access the path, villagers needed to negotiate the main road out of the village which had no footpaths and where traffic could travel at 60 miles per hour (97 km/h).

== See also ==
- Listed buildings in Cherry Burton

== Gallery ==
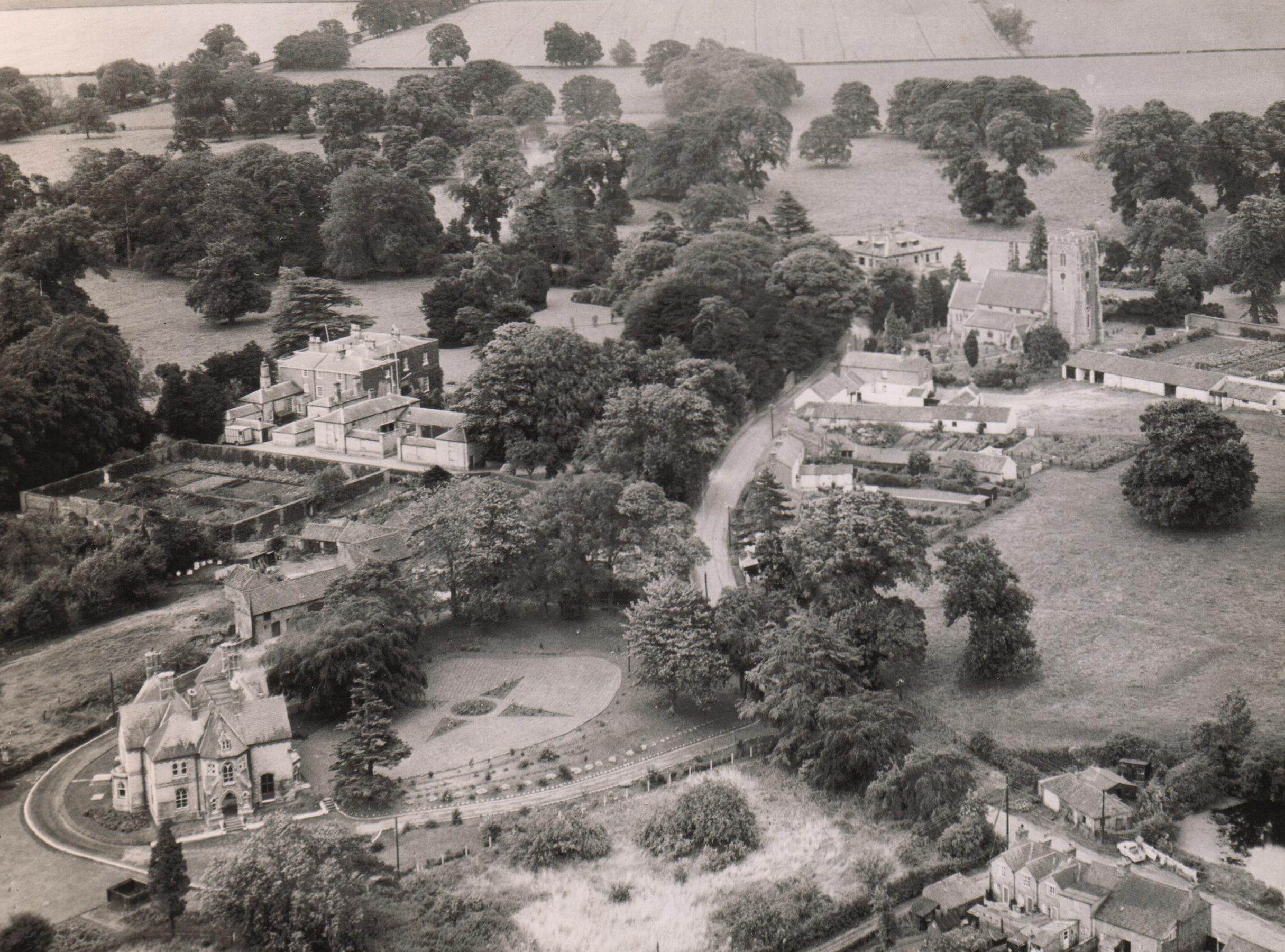
Aerial Photo Cherry Burton c. 1960

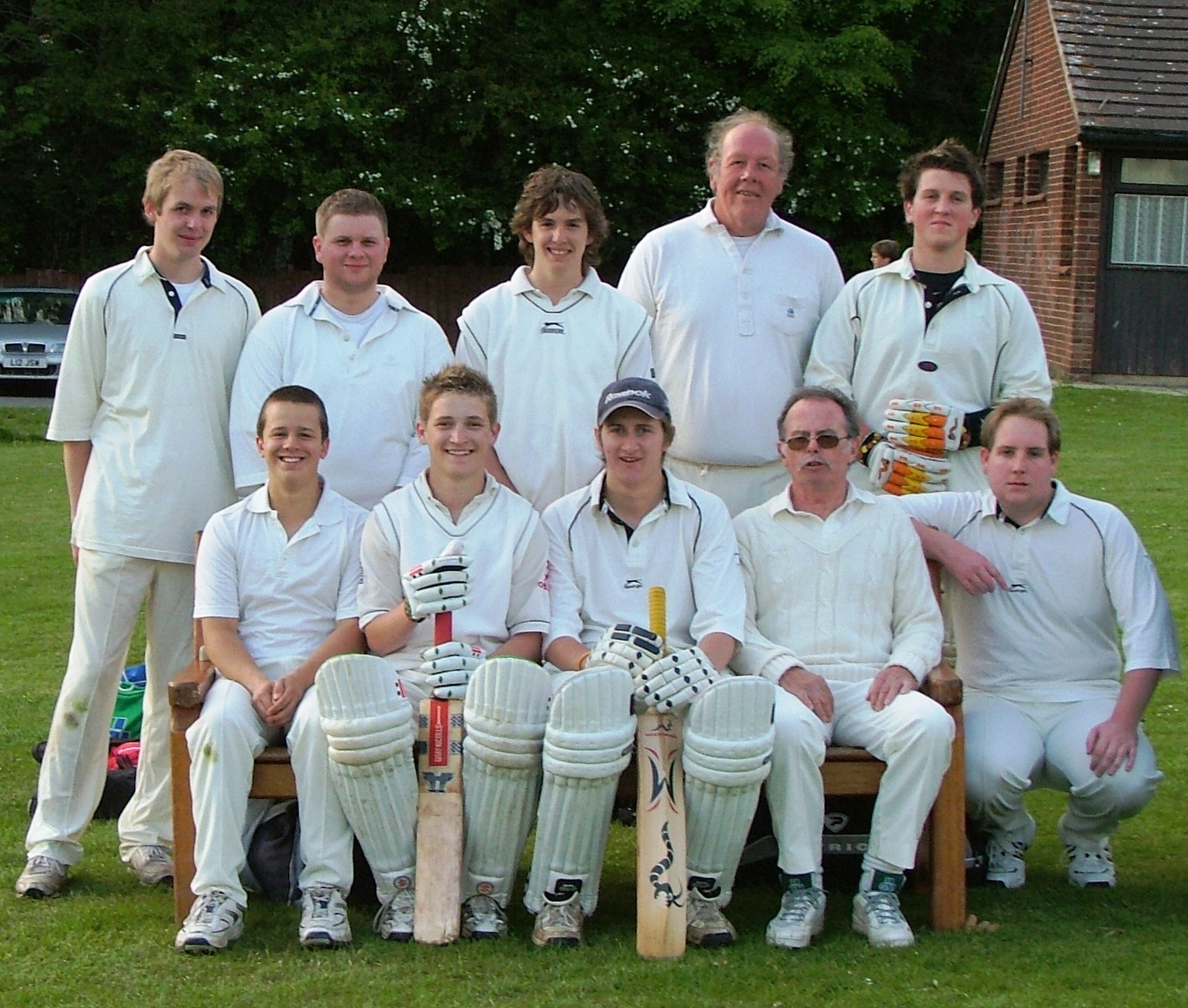
Cherry Burton Cricket Club team photo, 15 May 2008

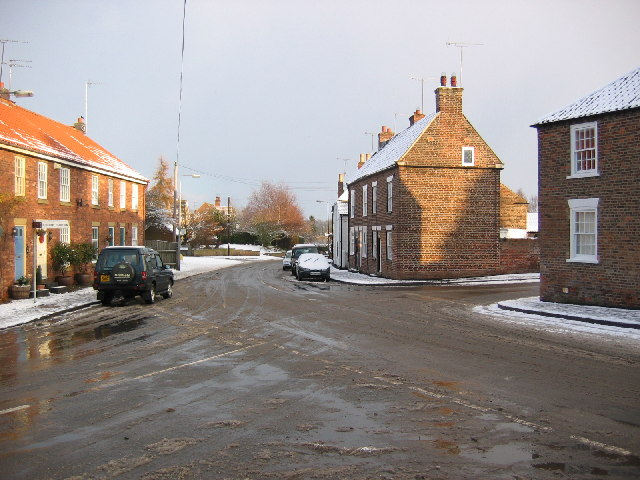
A winter day in Cherry Burton

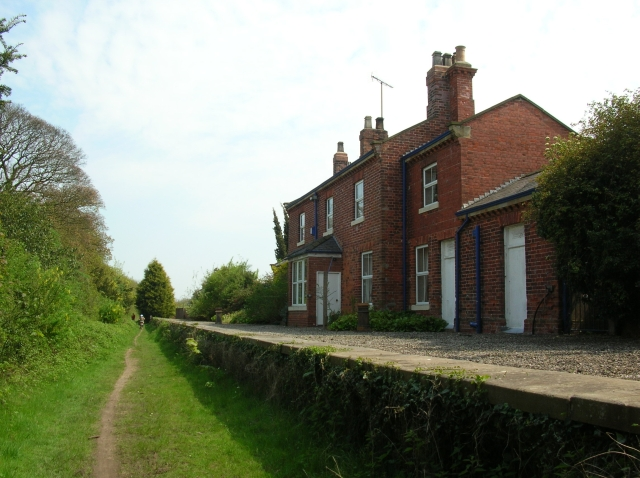
Cherry Burton railway station

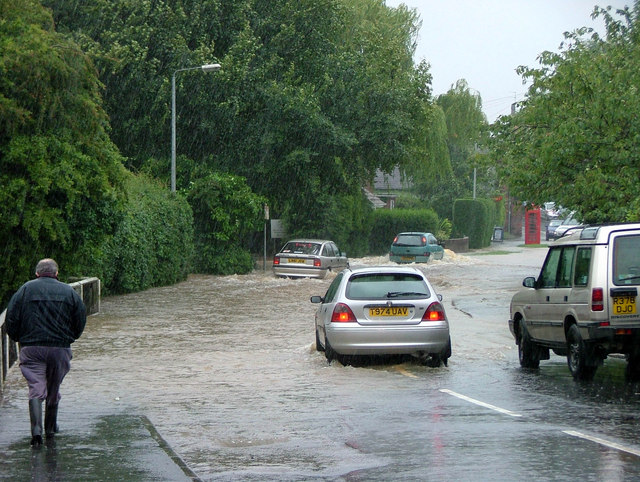
Cherry Burton in the 2007 floods
