= Tondu railway station =

Railway station in Bridgend, Wales

Tondu
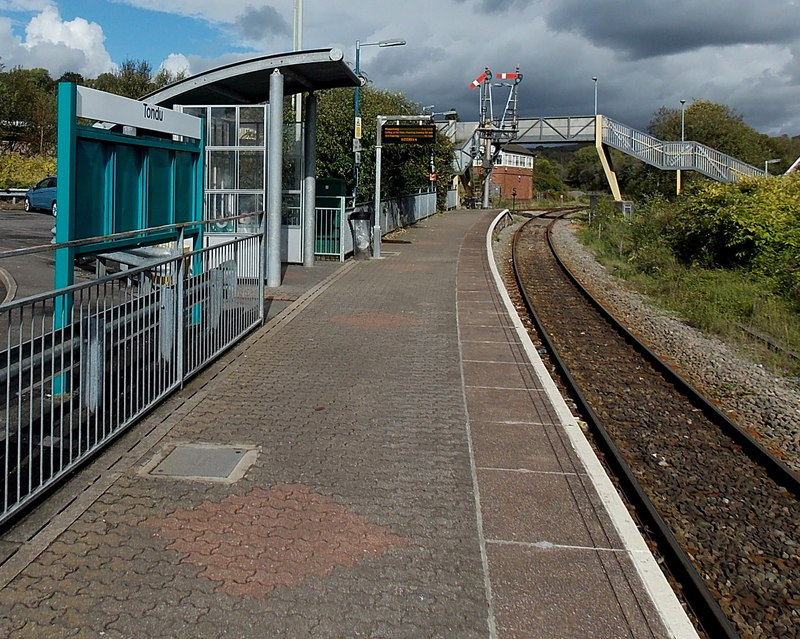
- Looking north along the platform towards Maesteg.

General information
- Location: Tondu, Bridgend; Wales
- Coordinates: 51.5474°N 3.5952°W
- Grid reference: SS894843
- Manager: Transport for Wales Rail
- Platforms: 1

Other information
- Station code: TDU
- Classification: DfT category F1

History
- Original company: Llynvi Valley Railway
- Pre-grouping: Great Western Railway
- Post-grouping: Great Western Railway

Key dates
- 25 February 1864: Opened
- 22 June 1970: Closed
- 28 September 1992: Reopened

Passengers
- 2021/22: ▲28,370
- 2022/23: ▲39,936
- 2023/24: ▲47,238
- 2024/25: ▲49,950
- 2025/26: ▲52,974
Location
Notes
- Passenger statistics from the Office of Rail and Road

Tondu railway station is a railway station serving the village of Tondu, Bridgend county borough, South Wales. It is located on the Maesteg Line from Cardiff via Bridgend.

Passenger services are operated by Transport for Wales Rail as part of the Valley Lines network for local services.

== History ==
The station was opened by the Llynvi Valley Railway on 25 February 1864. Originally developed as part of the Duffryn Llynvi and Porthcawl Railway, it was a junction of six railway lines:

- The Duffryn Llynvi and Porthcawl Railway from Porthcawl to Maesteg and Abergwynfi
- The Maesteg Line to Bridgend, connecting to the South Wales Main Line
- The Ogmore Valley Railway to Brynmenyn & Nantymoel
- The Port Talbot Railway and Docks Company to Port Talbot docks and Pontyrhyl
- The Garw Valley Railway to Blaengarw and onwards to the Blaengarw and International collieries

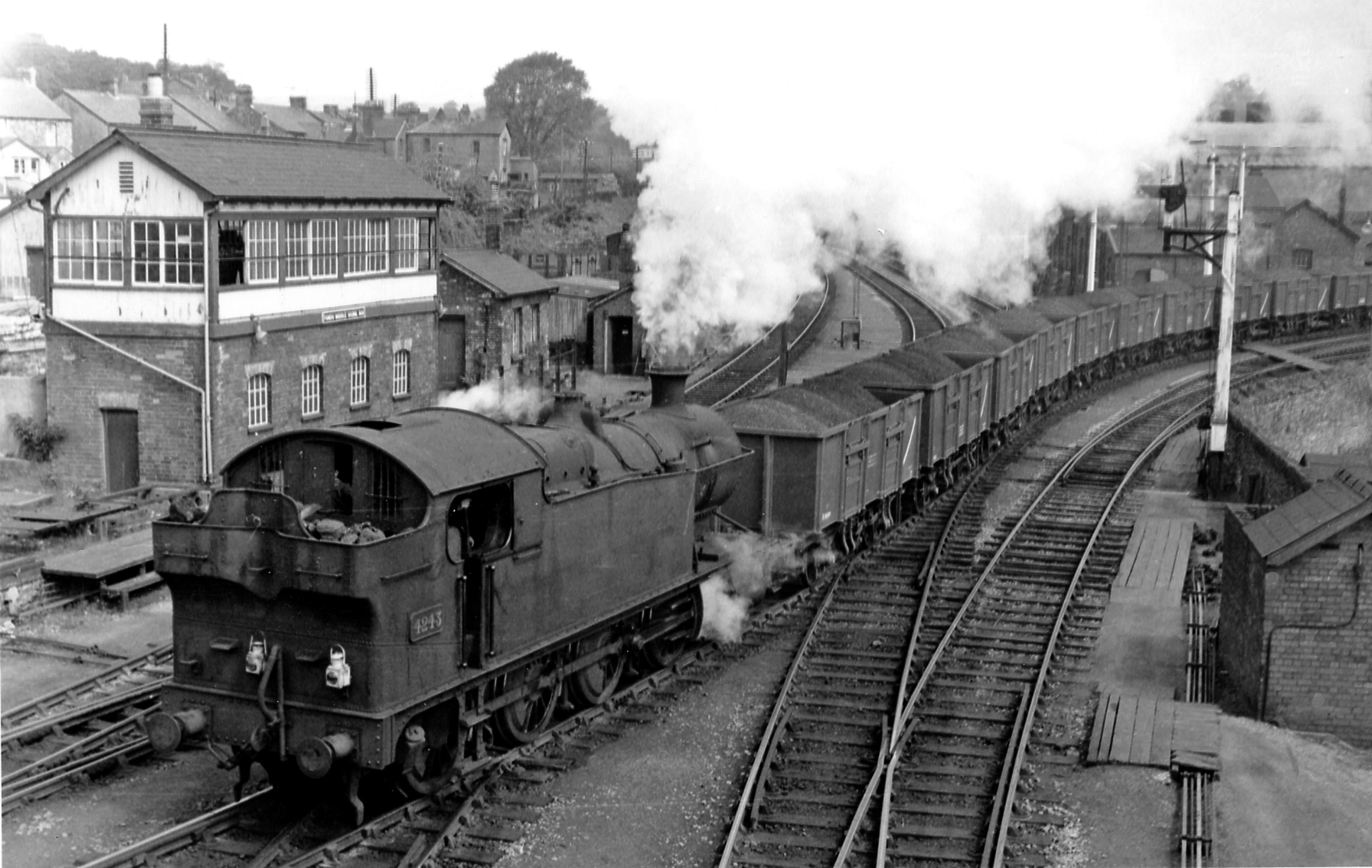
Coal train from the Ogmore Valleys passing Tondu in 1962

It hence had an extensive set of railway workshops, and was also the junction access point for the Tondu Ironworks. Enough traffic flowed through the junction to warrant a sizable locomotive shed. The original Ogmore Valley Railway shed was demolished in 1889 to make way for a roundhouse shed, which later became home to various Great Western Railway allocated tank engines.

The ironworks shut from 1895 onwards, but the previous developments meant that it remained an important junction with the installation of a wagon works for the collieries in the area. After British Railways closed most of the branch lines to passengers in the 1950s and early 1960s and the demise of the Blaengarw and International collieries in the late 1980s, the station and lines were greatly rationalised. The locomotive shed closed in the late-sixties. Tondu station was closed on 22 June 1970 (with the end of passenger trains over the old L&O route to Cymmer Afan) and was reopened on 28 September 1992. British Rail and Mid Glamorgan County Council reopened the line.

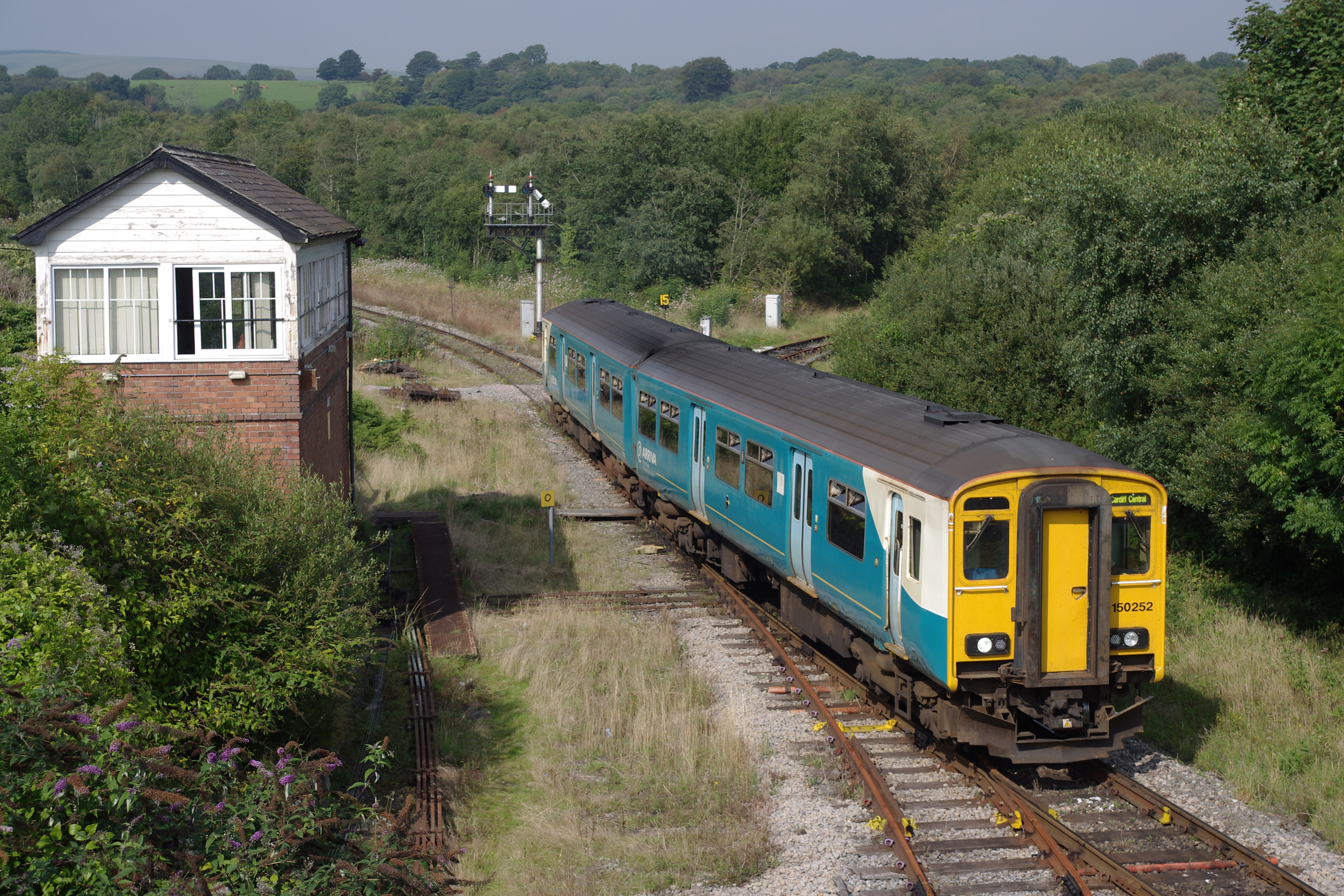
Arriva Trains Wales 150252 passes the Tondu Junction signal box with a service to Cardiff Central.

The current passing loop is still controlled by the former Tondu junction signal box, which manually controls the line using semaphore signals. As well as the former Maesteg Line, the former Port Talbot Railway and Docks Company line exists as a freight-only by-pass line to Margam. Passenger trains would sometimes be diverted through this branch-line whenever the main-line between Bridgend and Port Talbot was closed for engineering work. Trains were diverted to travel via and reverse at Tondu. Nowadays, when the main-line is closed, bus services will replace train services as the old branch has speed restrictions of 5-15 mph in force.

== Services ==
A basic hourly service is in operation, northbound to Maesteg and southbound to Bridgend and Cardiff Central. Most southbound trains continue onwards from Cardiff to Newport, Gloucester and Cheltenham Spa.

Preceding station	National Rail	Following station
Sarn	Transport for Wales; Maesteg Line	Garth
	Historical railways	
Kenfig Hill; Line open, station closed	Great Western Railway; Maesteg Line	Llangynwyd; Line open, station closed.
