= Bishop Burton =

Village and civil parish in the East Riding of Yorkshire, England

Coordinates: 53.845042°N 0.498802°W

- Location within the East Riding of Yorkshire
- Population: 696 (2011 census)
- OS grid reference: SE988398
  - London: 160 mi (260 km) S
- Civil parish: Bishop Burton
- Unitary authority: East Riding of Yorkshire
- Ceremonial county: East Riding of Yorkshire
- Region: Yorkshire and the Humber
- Country: England
- Sovereign state: United Kingdom
- Post town: BEVERLEY
- Postcode district: HU17
- Dialling code: 01964
- Police: Humberside
- Fire: Humberside
- Ambulance: Yorkshire
- UK Parliament: Beverley and Holderness

Bishop Burton is a village and civil parish in the East Riding of Yorkshire, England. It lies on the A1079 road approximately three miles (5 km) to the west of the market town of Beverley. Another "Burton" is Cherry Burton, a mile or so to the north.

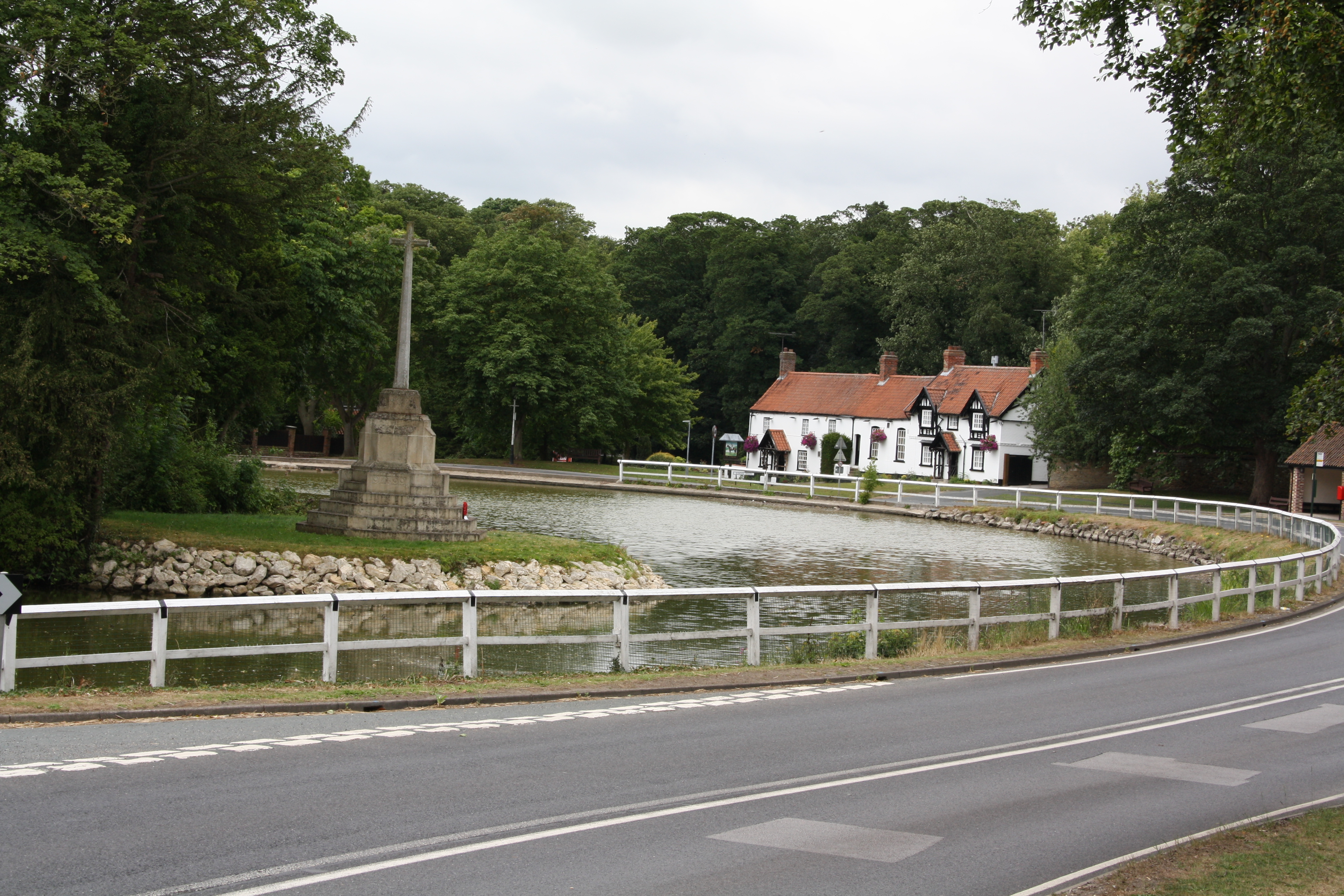
The Mere in Bishop Burton

== Name and residents ==
According to the 2011 UK census, Bishop Burton parish had a population of 696, an increase on the 2001 UK census figure of 628.

There has been human activity in Bishop Burton for at least 10,000 years, with traces left from the Mesolithic, Neolithic, Bronze Age, Iron Age and Romano-British eras.

The village (whose name may derive from Burtone, meaning fortified farmstead) is mentioned in the Domesday Book as belonging to the Archbishop of York and the site of Archbishop's Manor House continued to be the site of Manor Houses up to the demolition of High Hall in 1952.

== Features ==
The parish church, All Saints' Church, Bishop Burton, is a Grade II* listed building and its earliest parts date from the late 12th century. The only other surviving religious building is the Wesleyan Methodist Chapel, dating from 1840, which is now a house.

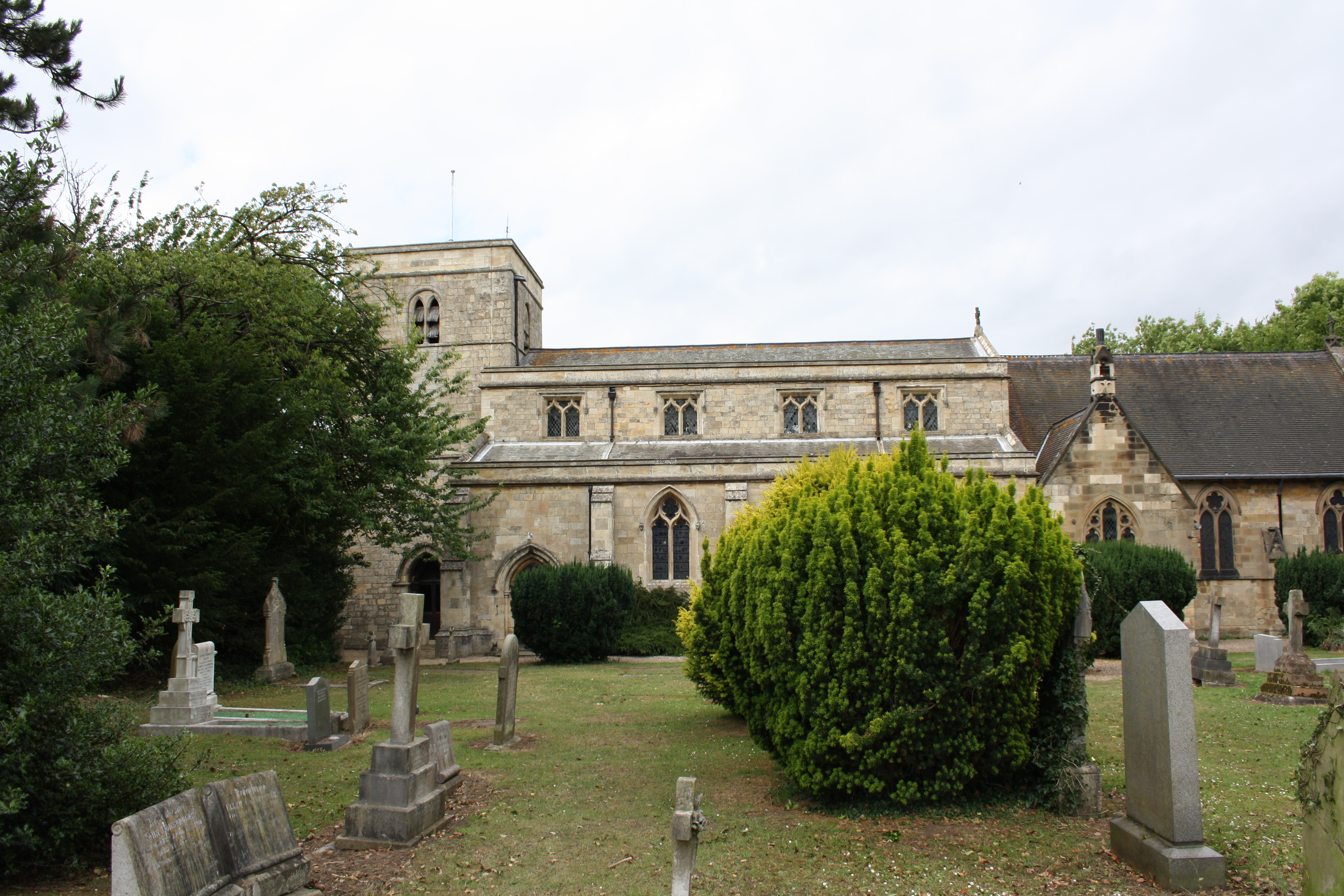
All Saints Church

There was a school in the village from 1743 to 1986.

In a field to the east of the village is one of the medieval stone boundary markers for the sanctuary of Saint John of Beverley that is now a Scheduled Ancient Monument.

The look and feel of the village - black and white colour scheme, rustic porches and clay pantiles - are the result of improvements to estate housing carried out by ERB Hall-Watt and Richard Hall-Watt (see below) in the late 19th and early 20th centuries. Subsequent development has often followed this architectural style to retain the unified feel of the village. It is readily apparent when it has not.

Bishop Burton is home to Bishop Burton College, a further education and higher education college specialising in agriculture and equine studies.

Bishop Burton is also the home to Bishop Burton United Football Club, formed in 2008 as Wilberforce & Larkin Football Club before moving to the village at the start of the 2009–10 season and changing the name to Bishop Burton United so as to emphasise their link with the village and their new home. Bishop Burton United play in the East Riding County Football League Division 3 with matches taking place on Saturdays with a 2 pm kick off. United's home ground is the 4G artificial surface at Bishop Burton College. United's local rivals are nearby sides Molescroft Rangers and Market Weighton United. United have a reputation as a progressive and ambitious football club with the lofty aim of gaining semi-professional status within the next 7 years. The club is also known for its broad multicultural mix with Polish, Latvian, French, Indonesian and Nigerian players in their squad.

== The Gee and Watt families of Bishop Burton ==
=== History ===
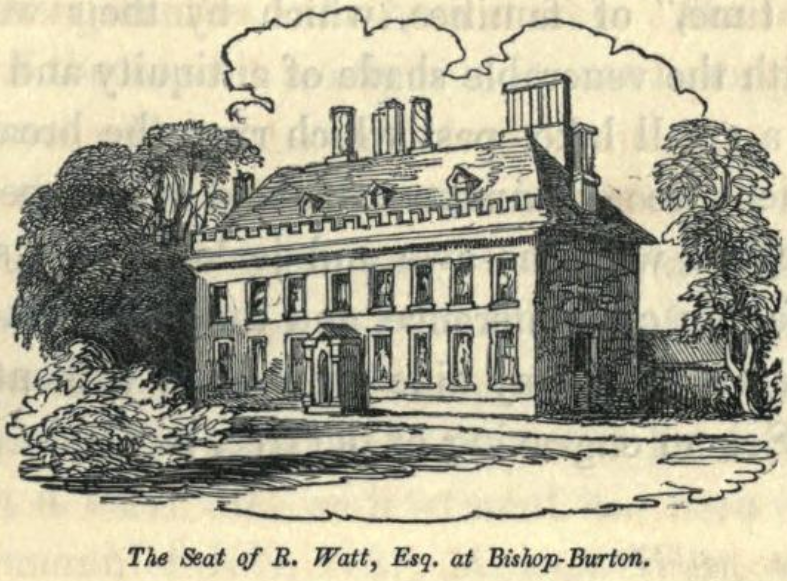
Bishop-Burton Hall, Beverley, Yorkshire, the seat of R. Watt Esq. in 1829

The Gee family were associated with Arthur Pearson-Gee, the brother of Karl Pearson. The Gees came from Rothley in Leicestershire.

- Henry Gee was the common ancestor of a senior branch of the family who remained in Rothley and the father of William Gee who first moved to Hull as a master mariner.
- William Gee (1561–1611) became a Merchant of the Staple and acquired great wealth. He was sheriff of Hull in 1560 and mayor in 1562, 1573 and 1582. He was the benefactor of Hull Grammar School and founded a hospital for ten poor women.
- His eldest son, William Gee (b.1562), was secretary of the Council of the North and Keeper of the Signet from 1604. He purchased the Bishop Burton estate in 1603 and built a hall.
- The estate and hall both subsequently descended in the Gee family until being bought by Richard Watt (1751–1798) in 1783. Richard Watt had started life as a stable boy and coach driver at the village inn before joining a merchant ship bound for the West Indies. There he bought a plantation and exploited slave labour to produce rum and sugar. Some of his estate accounts for Jamaica are in the collection.
- When Richard Watt (d.1798) died his estates were inherited by his nephew, Richard Watt (d.1812) and then his grandnephew, also Richard Watt (1786–1855). The latter was a horse breeder who had four winners of the St Leger.
- When Richard Watt died in 1855, the estates passed to two of his sons before lying unoccupied until 1886 when they passed to Ernest Richard Bradley Hall-Watt (1865–1908). He was an early motoring enthusiast and died in a car accident.
- He was succeeded by his son, Richard Hall-Watt (1898–1917), who was killed during the First World War.
- Richard Hall-Watt was succeeded by his brother, Alvery Digby Hall-Watt (1901–1961), who sold the estate in 1930. It is now Bishop Burton Agricultural College.

=== Monument and archives ===
Monument to Rachel and Elizabeth Gee

This alabaster monument was found in an old vault under the floor of the chancel in 1865 and restored to its position in the church. It is to Rachel, wife of William Gee Esq. of the Bishop Burton Estate.

Rachel was the daughter of Thomas Parker of Ratton, and she died in 1649 aged 33. William Gee Esq. (d 1683) was the grandson of Sir William Gee of Bishop Burton (d.1611), secretary to James I (r.1603–25). Sir William, then of Beverley, bought the estate after it was surrendered to the crown in 1543, being part of the Archbishop of York's estate.

The memorial now consists of the shrouded figure of Rachel, full length with her face, one arm and hand exposed, and the small figure of a child which kneels at her head. These two items are thought to have been part of a larger monument, which has probably been destroyed.

The Gee family archives in the Brynmor Jones Library of the University of Hull ( contain:

- estate papers dating from 1194 relating to land at Bishop Burton and the immediate surrounds of Cherry Burton and Walkington
- a few papers of the Watt family relating to their land at Speke in Lancashire and Georges Plain in Jamaica (1849–1861)
- manorial records for the manor of Bishop Burton
- a seventeenth-century volume of surveys and assessments for sewers at Ottringham
- papers for Walkington of John Lockwood and family.

== See also ==
- Listed buildings in Bishop Burton
