= St Michael's Church, Cherry Burton =

Church in Cherry Burton, East Riding of Yorkshire, England

Coordinates: 53.8644°N 0.4917°W

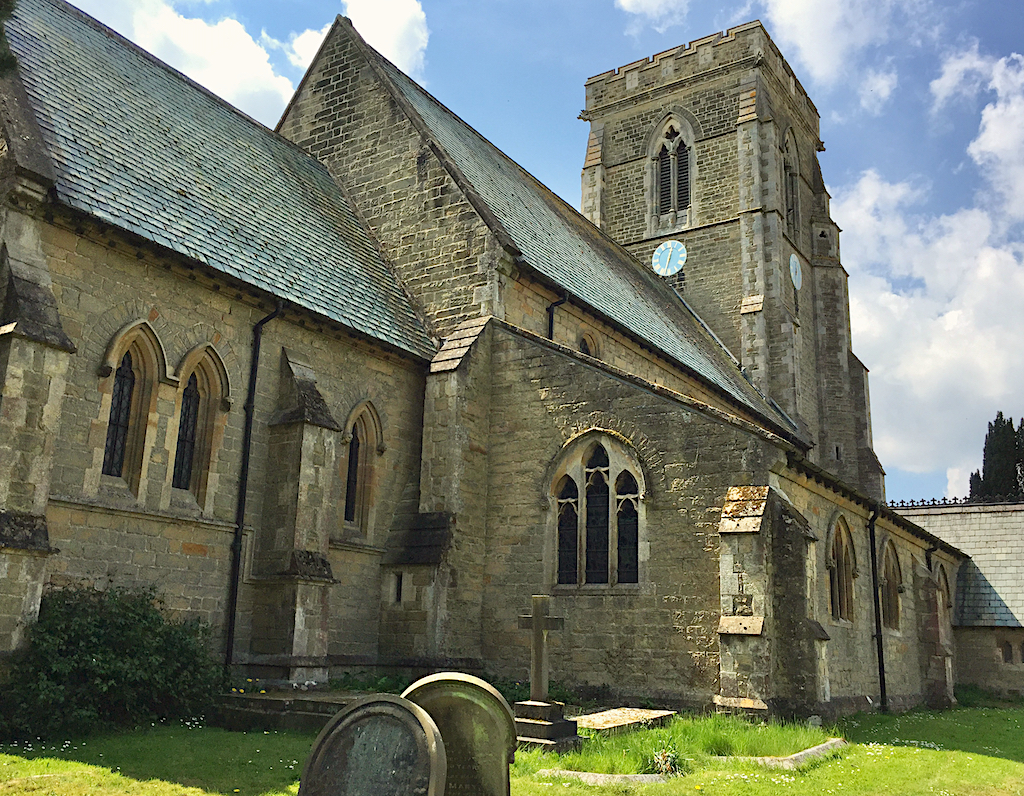
The church, in 2020

St Michael's Church is the parish church of Cherry Burton, a village in the East Riding of Yorkshire, in England.

There was a church in Cherry Burton in the mediaeval period, described in 1848 as "a small ancient edifice with a square tower, [with] traces of Norman and early English architecture". It was repaired in 1842, but between 1852 and 1853 it was demolished and a new church in the Gothic revival style built. It was designed by Charles Vickers, and the construction was co-ordinated by Horace Jones. The building was grade II listed in 1968.

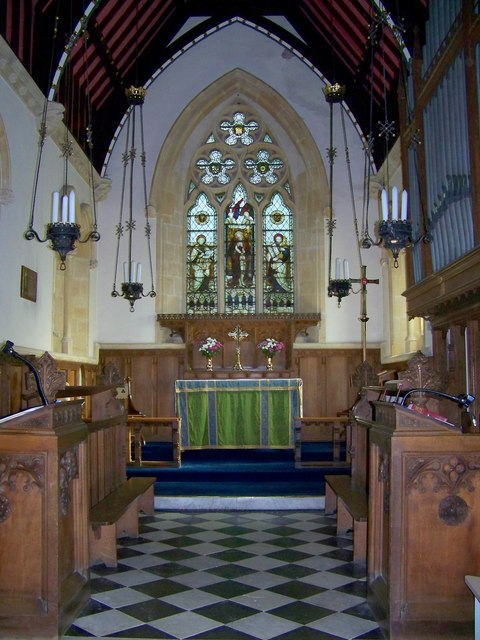
The interior, looking east

The church is built of sandstone, with limestone dressings and slate roofs. It consists of a nave with a clerestory, a north aisle, a north porch, a chancel with a south vestry, and a west tower. The tower has three stages, a moulded plinth, buttresses, a northwest octagonal stair turret, a trefoil-headed window, a clock face, a string course, two-light pointed bell openings with hood moulds, a ball flower cornice, and an embattled parapet. Inside, there is a five-sided carved stone pulpit, and a circular font on an octagonal pier. The choir stalls were installed in 1891 and were designed by Temple Moore, and there are several stained glass windows designed by Charles Eamer Kempe.

== See also ==
- Listed buildings in Cherry Burton
