= Listed buildings in Bishop Burton =

Bishop Burton is a civil parish in the county of the East Riding of Yorkshire, England. It contains 16 listed buildings that are recorded in the National Heritage List for England. Of these, one is listed at Grade II*, the middle of the three grades, and the others are at Grade II, the lowest grade. The parish contains the village of Bishop Burton and the surrounding countryside. Most of the listed buildings are houses and farmhouses, and the others include a church, a water pump, a lodge and a war memorial.

== Key ==
Grade	Criteria
II*	Particularly important buildings of more than special interest
II	Buildings of national importance and special interest

== Buildings ==
Name and location	Photograph	Date	Notes	Grade
All Saints' Church; 53.84442°N 0.49606°W		Early 13th century	The church has been altered and extended through the centuries. The oldest part is the west tower, the church was partly rebuilt in 1820–23, and the chancel was rebuilt in 1864–65 by J. L. Pearson. The church is built in stone with slate roofs, and consists of a nave with a clerestory, north and south aisles, a chancel with a south vestry, and a west tower. The tower has three stages, a chamfered plinth, north and south doorways with pointed arches, string courses, a north clock face, two-light bell openings, and a low parapet with moulded coping.	II*
Killingwoldgraves; 53.84274°N 0.47965°W	—	c. 1700	The house is in colourwashed brick, with a cogged brick eaves cornice and a tile roof. There are two storeys and attics, and five bays. The central doorway has pilasters and a fanlight, and the windows are sashes under flat gauged brick arches. On the roof are two gabled dormers with casements.	II
13 and 14 The Green; 53.84623°N 0.49723°W		Early 18th century	A house, later two cottages, in stone, with some brick, oversailing eaves and a pantile roof. There is one storey and attics, and three bays. The doorways are paired in a rustic timber porch, and the windows are horizontally sliding sashes under segmental brick arches. Above are three gabled dormers.	II
Lings Farmhouse; 53.84743°N 0.54518°W	—	Early 18th century	The farmhouse is in colourwashed and lined rendered brick and chalk, and it has a pantile roof with raised coped gables and shaped kneelers. There are two storeys and five bays. In the centre is a rustic timber porch, and the windows are sashes in architraves.	II
Callais Farm House; 53.84364°N 0.49689°W		Mid-18th century	The farmhouse is in orange brick, and has a pantile roof with tumbled-in brickwork to the raised gables. There are two storeys and attics, and four bays. The doorway has a fanlight, above it is a painted window, and the other windows are sashes; all the openings have flat gauged brick arches. On the roof are two gabled dormers.	II
Old Farmhouse; 53.84735°N 0.49592°W		Mid-18th century	The farmhouse is in dark red brick, with a stepped brick eaves cornice, and a pantile roof with tumbled-in brick on the gables. There are two storeys and four bays. The doorway has a fanlight, and the windows are sashes. The ground floor windows are paired under segmental brick arches, and on the upper floor they have cambered gauged brick arches.	II
Eastfield Farm House; 53.84646°N 0.49608°W		Late 18th century	The farmhouse is in colourwashed brick, with a stepped brick eaves cornice, oversailing eaves, and a two-span pantile roof. There are two storeys, a double depth plan, three bays, and a single-storey single-bay wing on the left. In the centre is a gabled porch, and a doorway with an architrave and a fanlight. The windows on the main block are sashes, and on the wing is a casement window under a segmental brick arch.	II
Forge Cottage; 53.84654°N 0.49654°W		Late 18th century	The house is in colourwashed brick, with oversailing eaves and a pantile roof. There are two storeys and three bays. The central doorway has a divided fanlight, and the windows are sashes, those on the ground floor with cambered gauged brick arches.	II
North End Farmhouse; 53.84824°N 0.49606°W		Late 18th century	The farmhouse is in red brick, with a stepped brick eaves cornice, and a pantile roof with coped gables and stone shaped kneelers. There are two storeys and four bays. The doorway has a fanlight with radial glazing, and the windows are sashes with wedge lintels.	II
Northview; 53.84477°N 0.49746°W		Late 18th century	The house is in colourwashed brick with oversailing eaves and a pantile roof. There are two storeys and three bays, and a single-storey single-bay wing on the right. In the centre is an open timber porch and a doorway with a fanlight. The windows are sashes, those on the ground floor with channelled wedge lintels and louvered shutters.	II
Westfield Farmhouse; 53.84613°N 0.49550°W	—	Late 18th century	The farmhouse is in brown brick, with a stepped brick eaves cornice, and a pantile roof. There are two storeys and three bays. The central doorway has a fanlight, and the windows are sashes with cambered wedge lintels and raised keystones.	II
Bishop Burton Grange; 53.83966°N 0.48870°W		Early 19th century	The farmhouse is in red brick with a hipped slate roof. It consists of a main block with two storeys and three bays, flanked by two-storey one-bay links, each under a sloping roof, to pavilions with two storeys, one bay and a pyramidal roof. In the centre is a doorway with pilasters, a rectangular fanlight and a hood. Most of the windows are sashes, each linking bay has an oculus on the upper floor, and the pavilions have casement windows.	II
Red House; 53.84629°N 0.49602°W		Early 19th century	The house is in red brick on a plinth, with stone dressings and a slate roof. There are two storeys and three bays. The central doorway has pilasters and a fanlight. The windows are sashes under cambered channelled wedge lintels with feathered keystones.	II
Village pump 53.84534°N 0.49602°W		Mid-19th century	The water pump is adjacent to the village pond. It is in cast iron and has a circular vertical pump chamber, and a curved spout with a wooden extension. The handle is in wood, and it has an iron connecting rod.	II
Former High Hall Entrance Lodge; 53.84553°N 0.50036°W		1888	The lodge at the entrance to the grounds of Bishop Burton College has a ground floor in red brick on a chamfered plinth, with applied timber framing above, and tile roofs with gables. There are two storeys, the upper storey jettied, and an L-shaped plan. Most of the windows are casements, on the west front is an upper floor oriel window, and the porch has wooden columns.	II
War memorial 53.84549°N 0.49670°W		1922	The war memorial, designed by Temple Moore and Moore, is on a peninsular extending into The Mere. It is in sandstone, and consists of a Latin cross with a chamfered and tapering shaft, on a stepped octagonal and square pedestal, on a four-stepped, octagonal base. On the south face of the pedestal is a stone panel with the names of those who were lost in the First World War.	II
