= Kenfig Hill railway station =

Disused railway station in Kenfig Hill, Bridgend County Borough

Kenfig Hill

General information
- Location: Kenfig Hill, Glamorgan; Wales
- Coordinates: 51.5364°N 3.6753°W
- Grid reference: SS839832
- Platforms: 2

Other information
- Status: Disused

History
- Original company: Llynvi and Ogmore Railway
- Pre-grouping: Great Western Railway
- Post-grouping: Great Western Railway

Key dates
- 1 August 1865: Opened as Cefn
- 1 August 1885: Name changed to Kenfig Hill
- 5 May 1958: Closed
Location

Kenfig Hill railway station served the village of Kenfig Hill, in the historical county of Glamorgan, Wales, from 1865 to 1958 on the Llynvi and Ogmore Railway.

== History ==
The station was opened as Cefn on 1 August 1865 by the Llynvi and Ogmore Railway. Its name was changed on 1 August 1885 to avoid confusion with a station of the same name in Wrexham. The station closed on 5 May 1958. No traces remain.

| Preceding station | Disused railways | Following station |
|---|---|---|
| Tondu; Line partially open, station open | Llynvi and Ogmore Railway | Pyle; Line partially open, station closed |
