= David Stewart of Garth =

British general (1772–1829)

Major-General David Stewart of Garth CB FRSE FSA Scot FLS
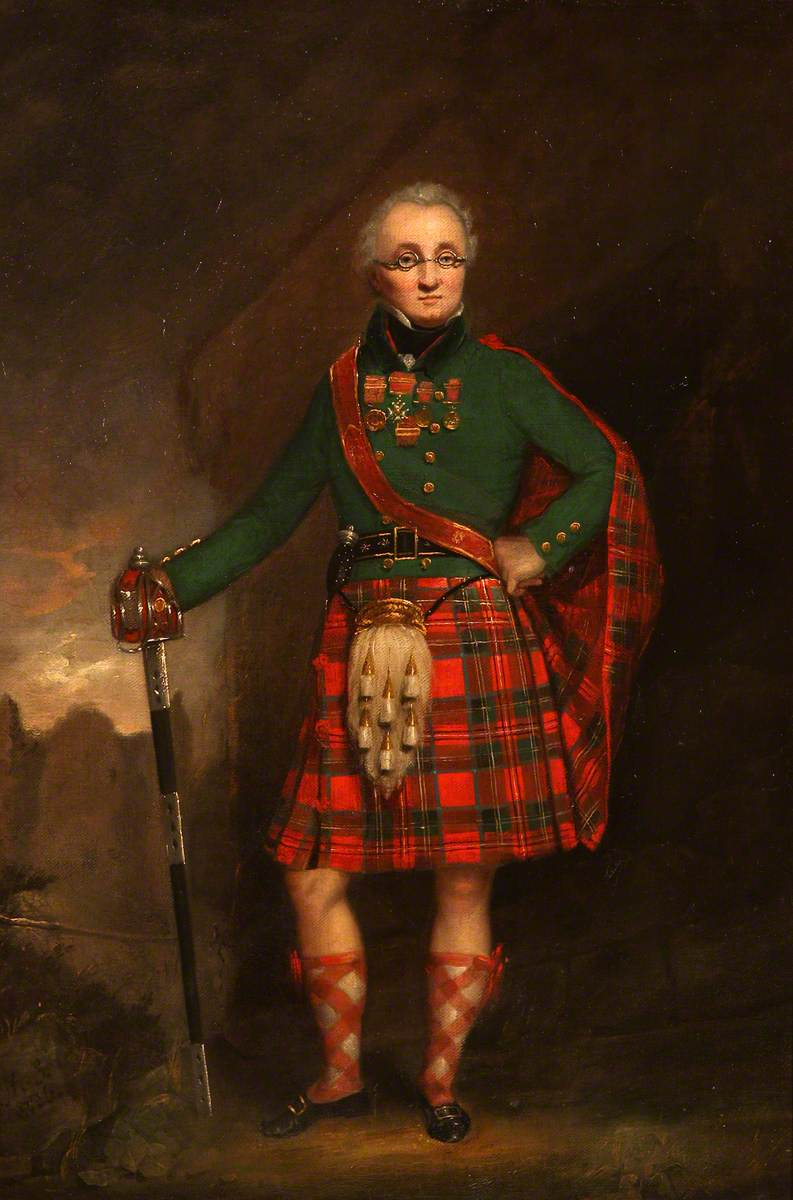
- Stewart in the dress uniform of the Black Watch
- Born: 12 April 1772; Drumcharry House or Kynachan, Fortingall, Perthshire
- Died: 18 December 1829 (aged 57); St. Lucia
- Burial place: St. Lucia
- Military career
- Allegiance: Scotland
- Branch: British Army
- Service years: 1783 to 1815
- Rank: Major-General
- Nickname: Davie
- Units: 42nd Regiment of Foot, Black Watch
- Commands: Battle of San Juan (1797); Capture of Minorca (1798); Battle of Alexandria; French Revolutionary Wars

David Stewart of Garth CB FRSE FSA Scot FLS (12 April 1772 – 18 December 1829) was a Scottish soldier and later author and antiquarian, whose book, Sketches of the Character, Manners, and Present State of the Highlanders of Scotland published in two volumes by Archibald Constable and Co in Edinburgh in 1822, was responsible for largely creating the modern image of the Highlander, the clans and Scottish regiments and is considered the foundation for all subsequent work on Highlanders, clans and Scottish regiments system.

He held commissions in several Highland regiments, notably the 42nd Royal Highland Regiment, (The ‘Black Watch’) from 1787 to 1804. Ultimately he rose to the rank of Major General. In 1819, he was elected a Fellow of the Royal Society of Edinburgh. His proposers were Lord Gray, Sir George Steuart Mackenzie and Sir David Brewster.

== Personal life ==
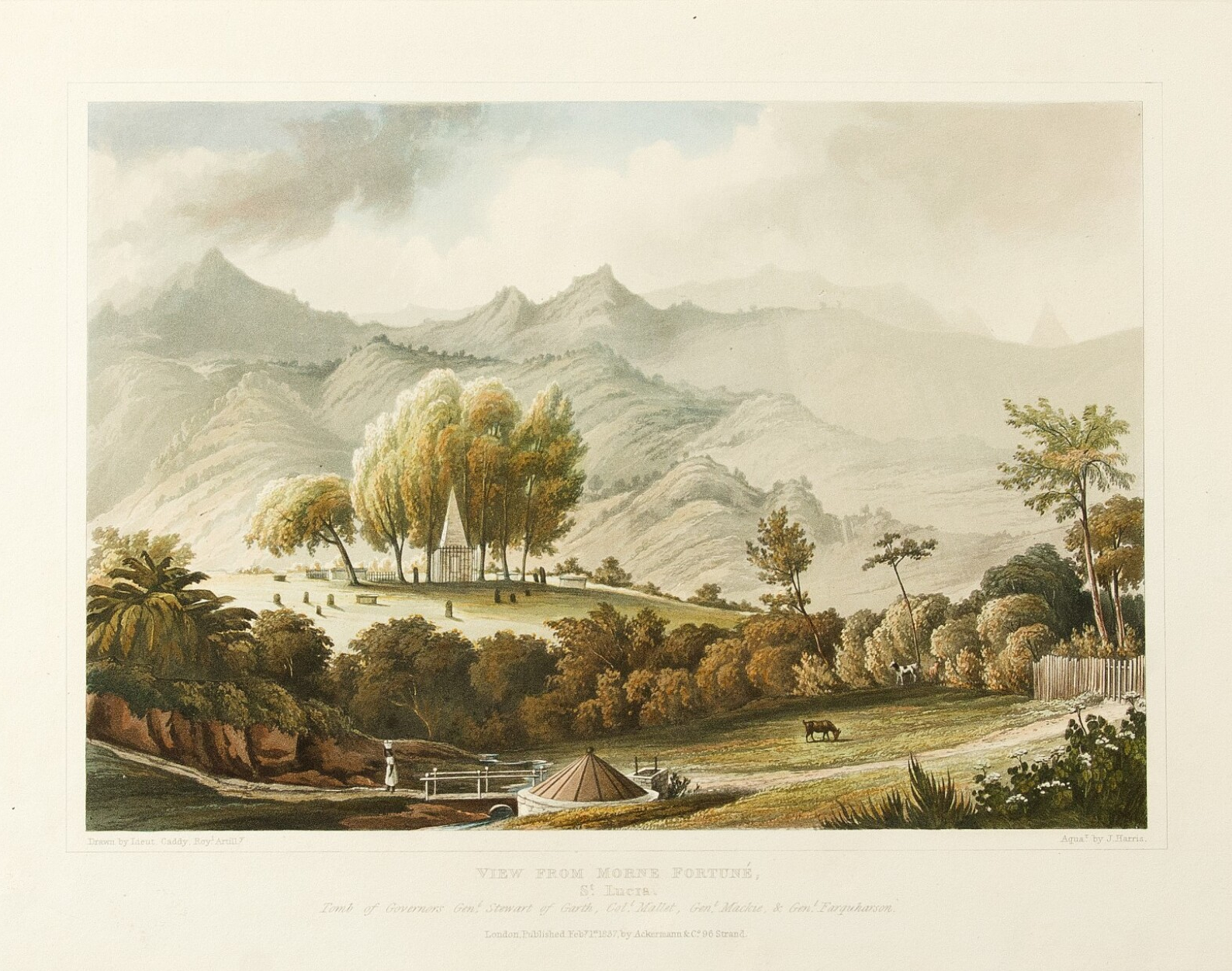
Stewart's tomb at Morne Fortune, St. Lucia

Stewart was born at Drumcharry House in the Parish of Fortingall or at Kynachan in the Parish of Dull on 12 April 1772, the second son of Robert Stewart of Garth, Perthshire, and was descended from James Stewart (grandson of Robert II) who built Garth Castle, north-west of Aberfeldy, as a home for the chieftain of Clan Stewart of Atholl at the end of the fourteenth century. His mother was Janet Stewart of Kynachan, who died when he was 13. In July 1822, after publishing his book, he succeeded to the heavily indebted estates of Garth, Drumcharry, Kynachan and Inchgarth by the death of his elder brother William. When George IV visited Edinburgh in August 1822, Stewart helped Sir Walter Scott in the reception arrangements, headed the Celtic club in the procession, adjusted the royal plaid for the levée, and pronounced the king ‘a very pretty man’ (Lockhart). He was promoted to major-general on 27 May 1825, and in 1829 he was appointed governor of Saint Lucia. On 18 December 1829 he died of fever on St Lucia.

== Military life ==
His father purchased for him a commission as ensign in the 77th, (Atholl Highlanders) on 21 April 1783, but that regiment was disbanded soon afterwards. He joined the 42nd highlanders (later Black Watch) on 10 August 1787, and became lieutenant on 8 August 1792, and captain-lieutenant on 24 June 1796. He served with the 42nd in Flanders in 1794 during the French Revolutionary Wars under the Duke of York, and went with it to the West Indies in October 1795. As part of the Napoleonic wars, he took part in the capture of the French colonies of St. Lucia and St. Vincent. He was also in the unsuccessful expedition against Porto Rico (Battle of San Juan) in 1797.

Stewart returned to Europe with his regiment, and garrison at Gibraltar. Stewart embarked there with the expedition which resulted in the capture of Minorca in November 1798. But he was taken prisoner at sea, and was detained for a total of five months in Spain before he was exchanged. He went to Egypt with Abercromby's expedition, and was severely wounded at the battle of Alexandria on 21 March 1801. Three months before this, on 15 December 1800, he had obtained a company in the 90th (Perthshire volunteers), but he returned to the 42nd on 23 July 1802.

He obtained a majority in the 78th Highlanders, on 17 April 1804, by raising recruits for the second battalion which was then being formed, a thing which his popularity in the Highlands made easy to him. His men were so much attached to him that when he was at Shorncliffe army barracks, in the following year, Sir John Moore interposed to prevent his being sent to India to join the 1st battalion. He went with the 2nd battalion to the Mediterranean in September 1805, and shared in the descent on Calabria. At Maida, on 4 July 1806, under General John Stuart, he commanded a battalion of light companies and ensuring the defeat of the French under Jean Reynier outside the town. He was again severely wounded. He was appointed lieutenant-colonel of the West India rangers on 21 April 1808, and took part in the capture of Guadaloupe in 1810. He received a medal with one clasp for this and the operation at Maida, and in 1815 he was awarded Companion of the Most Honourable Order of the Bath He was promoted colonel in the army on 4 June 1814, and in the following year he was placed on half-pay.

== Book ==
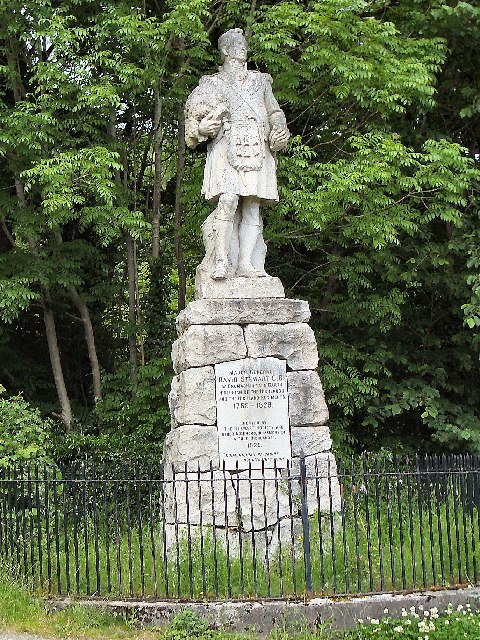
Monument to Major General David Stewart at Keltneyburn

In 1817, the officer commanding the 42nd, applied to Stewart for information regarding the history of the regiment, as its records had been lost. The inquiries which were undertaken by the request gradually developed into the Sketches of the Character ... book, which was published in two volumes at Edinburgh in 1822. John Stuart Blackie stated of the book: "whose excellence shines forth on every page", has been the foundation of all subsequent works on the clans. The first two parts of it, dealing with the country and the people, occupy about half of the first volume; the remainder is devoted the annals of Scottish regiments.

Remarks on Colonel Stewart's Sketches of the Highlanders were published at Edinburgh in 1823, admitting its merits, but objecting to its Jacobite sympathies. Stewart had thoughts of writing a history of the rebellion of 1745, but gave it up.

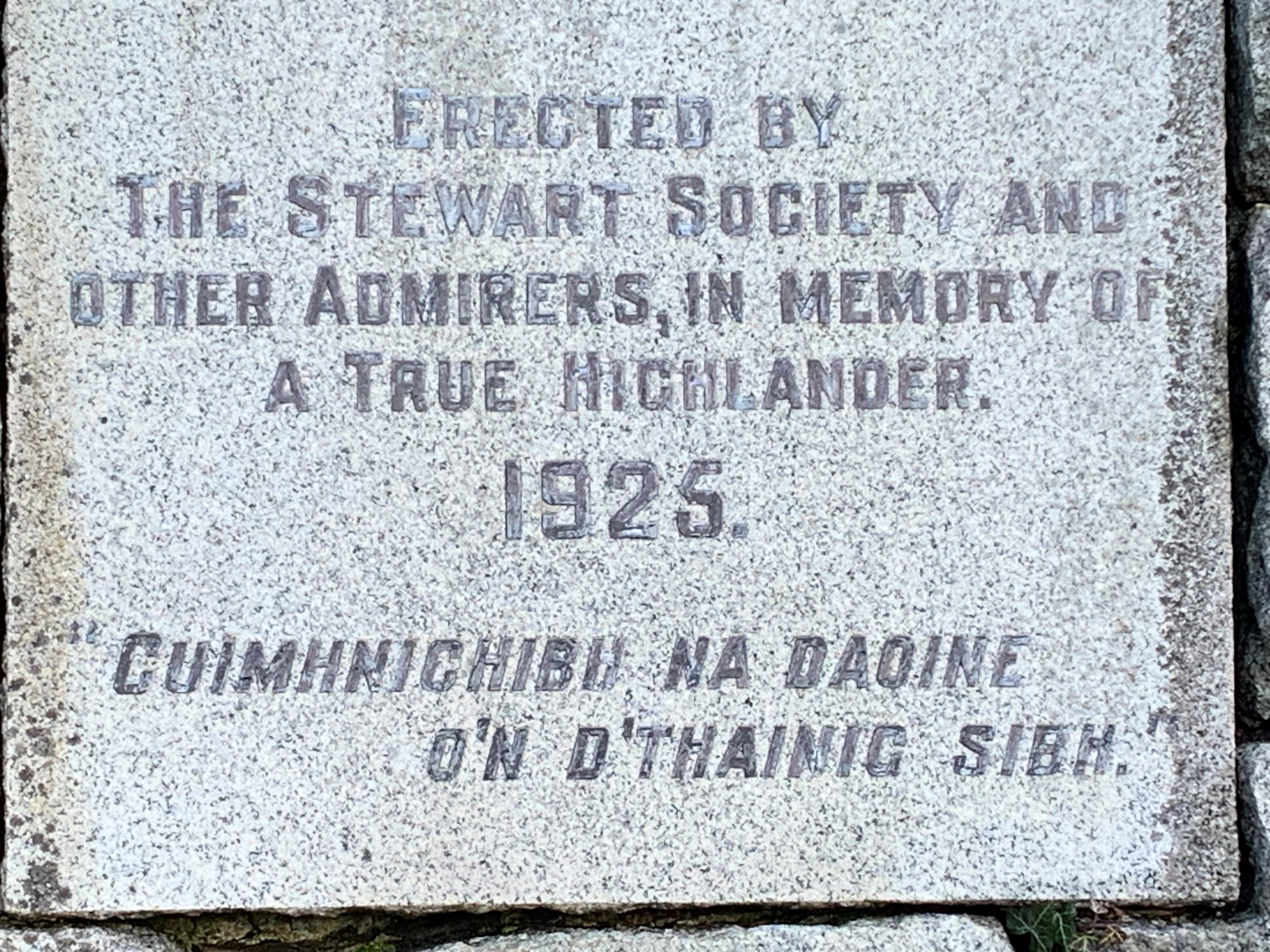
Wording on General David Stewart of Garth's memorial near Aberfeldy
