= High Gardham =

Hamlet in the East Riding of Yorkshire, England

Coordinates: 53.851833°N 0.561499°W

- Location within the East Riding of Yorkshire
- OS grid reference: SE947404
  - London: 160 mi (260 km) S
- Civil parish: Cherry Burton
- Unitary authority: East Riding of Yorkshire
- Ceremonial county: East Riding of Yorkshire
- Region: Yorkshire and the Humber
- Country: England
- Sovereign state: United Kingdom
- Post town: BEVERLEY
- Postcode district: HU17
- Dialling code: 01964
- Police: Humberside
- Fire: Humberside
- Ambulance: Yorkshire
- UK Parliament: Beverley and Holderness

High Gardham is a small hamlet in the East Riding of Yorkshire, England. It is situated approximately 5.5 miles (9 km) west of Beverley town centre and 3 miles (5 km) west of the village of Cherry Burton. It lies to the south of the A1079 road.

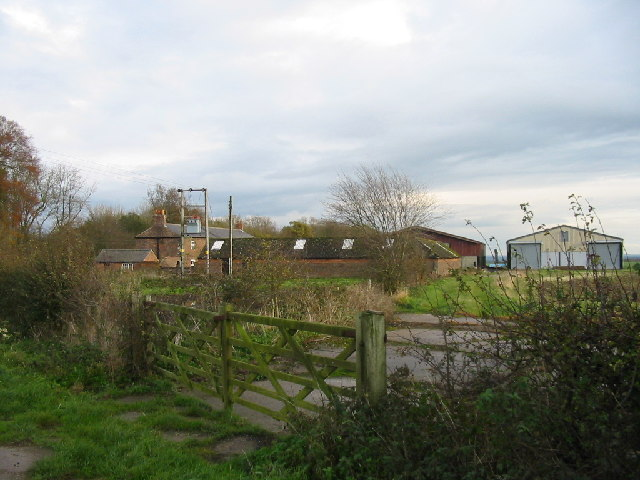
High Gardham Farm

High Gardham forms part of the civil parish of Cherry Burton.
