= Llangynwyd railway station =

Former railway station in Wales

Llangynwyd
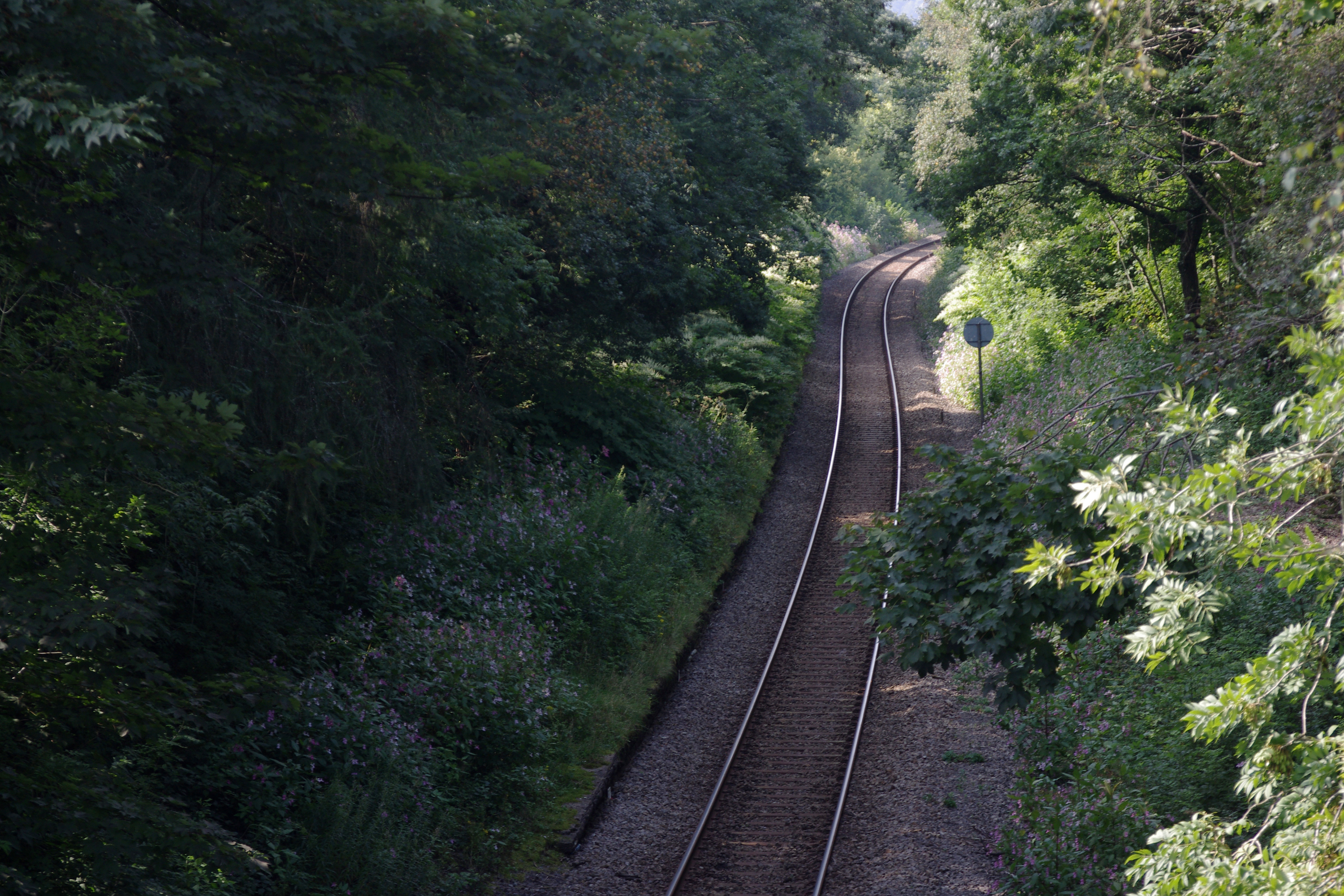
- The old overgrown platform by the reopened Maesteg Line.

General information
- Location: Llangynwyd, Bridgend; Wales
- Coordinates: 51.5887°N 3.6311°W
- Grid reference: SS870890
- Platforms: 1

Other information
- Status: Disused

History
- Original company: Llynvi Valley Railway
- Pre-grouping: Great Western Railway
- Post-grouping: Great Western Railway

Key dates
- 25 February 1864: Station opened as Llangonoyd
- 1 January 1917: Station closed
- 1 January 1919: Station reopened
- March 1935: Renamed Llangynwyd
- 15 July 1970: Station closed
Location

Llangynwyd railway station is on the Maesteg Line in Bridgend County Borough, Wales. It was closed to regular passenger trains on 22 June 1970 but continued to be served by school trains until 15 July 1970, The line through the station reopened in 1992 by British Rail.

Preceding station	Historical railways	Following station
Tondu; Line and station open	Great Western Railway	Garth; Line and station open
