= All Saints' Church, Bishop Burton =

Church in Bishop Burton, East Riding of Yorkshire, England

Coordinates: 53.8444°N 0.4962°W

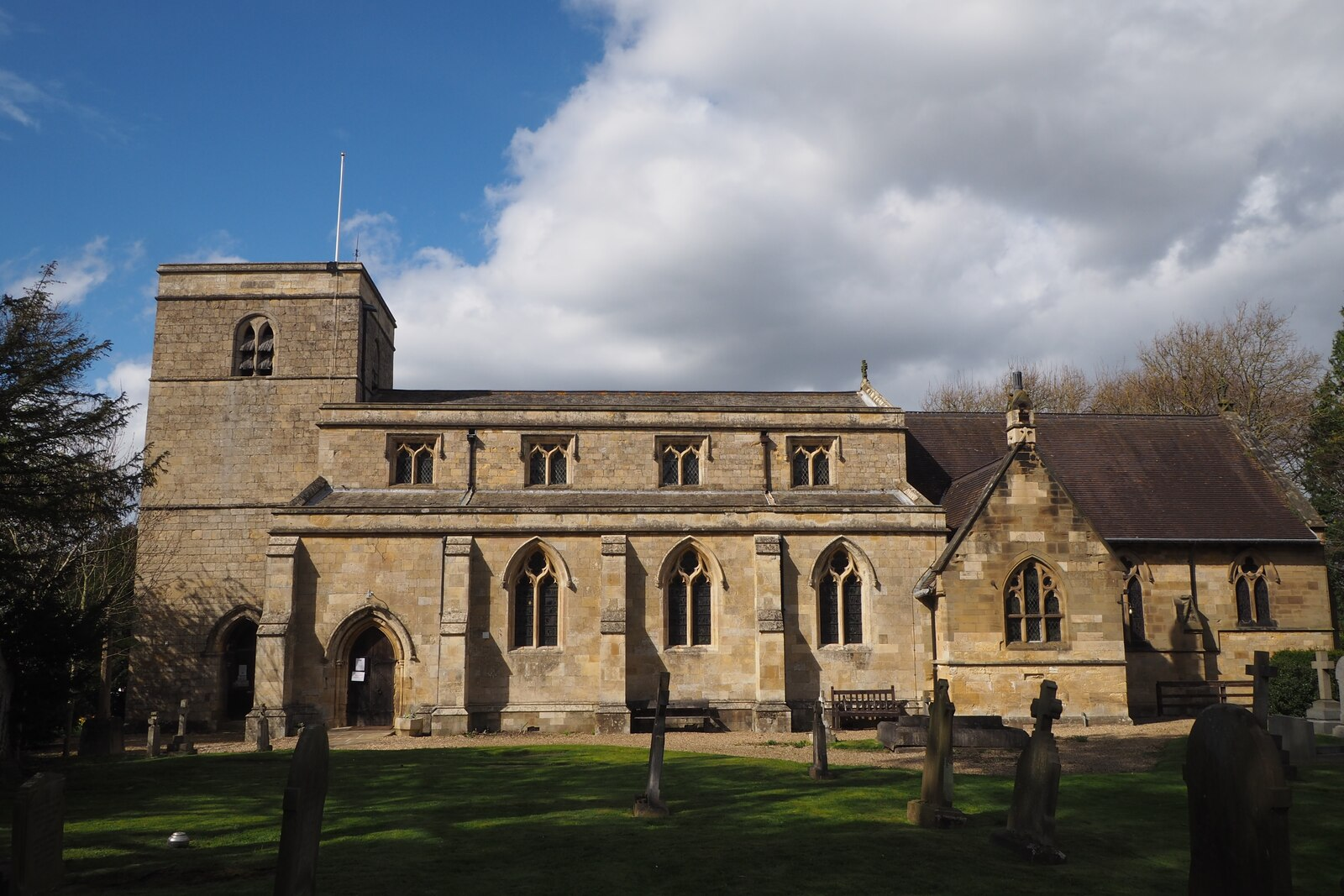
The church, in 2022

All Saints' Church is the parish church of Bishop Burton, a village in the East Riding of Yorkshire, in England.

The first church in Bishop Burton is thought to have been dedicated by John of Beverley in the early 8th century. The oldest parts of the current building are parts of the nave and tower, which date from the early 13th century. Aisles were added to the nave in the 14th century. The tower was largely rebuilt in 1663, then the aisles were rebuilt in 1821. From 1864 to 1865, a chancel and vestry were built by John Loughborough Pearson. The building was grade II* listed in 1968.

The church is built of stone with slate roofs, and consists of a nave with a clerestory, north and south aisles, a chancel with a south vestry, and a west tower. The tower has three stages, a chamfered plinth, north and south doorways with pointed arches, string courses, a north clock face, two-light bell openings, and a low parapet with moulded coping. Inside, there is a 14th-century piscina, a 12th-century carved stone figure, and an 18th-century font. There is a black marble tablet memorial to Tobias Hodson, who died in 1664, and an alabaster chest tomb for Rachel Gee, who died in 1684. There are two 15th-century brass memorials and one from the early 16th century.

== See also ==
- Grade II* listed buildings in the East Riding of Yorkshire
- Listed buildings in Bishop Burton
