= Garth railway station (Bridgend) =

Railway station in Bridgend, Wales

Garth (Bridgend)
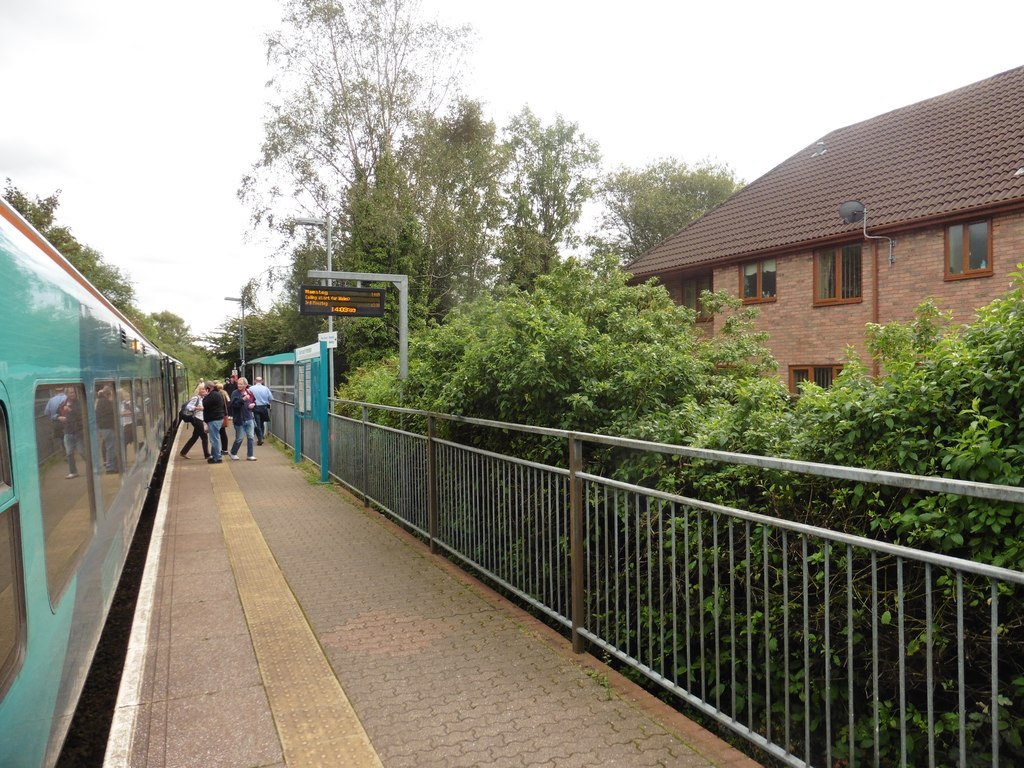

General information
- Location: Garth, Bridgend; Wales
- Coordinates: 51.5967°N 3.6428°W
- Grid reference: SS863899
- Manager: Transport for Wales
- Platforms: 1

Other information
- Station code: GMG
- Classification: DfT category F2

History
- Original company: British Rail

Key dates
- 28 September 1992: Opened as Garth

Passengers
- 2021/22: ▲11,144
- 2022/23: ▲14,492
- 2023/24: ▲18,140
- 2024/25: ▲22,396
- 2025/26: ▲27,350
Location
Notes
- Passenger statistics from the Office of Rail and Road

Garth railway station (Bridgend) is a railway station serving the village of Garth, Bridgend, Wales. It is located on the Maesteg Line from Cardiff via Bridgend. The station is known as Garth (Bridgend) in order to differentiate it from Garth (Powys).

== History ==
It replaced a previous station, south of the current location, which was known as 'Troedyrhiw Garth', which closed in 1970. When the current station opened with the restoration of passenger services in 1992 by British Rail, there was much local debate whether to call the station 'Troedyrhiw Garth' once more because of the potential confusion with Garth Railway Station on the Heart of Wales Line in Powys. Upon opening on 28 September 1992 the new station was named simply Garth.

== Service ==
Passenger services are operated by Transport for Wales as part of the Valley Lines commuter rail network.

| Preceding station | National Rail | Following station |
|---|---|---|
| Tondu | Transport for Wales; Maesteg Line | Maesteg (Ewenny Road) |
| | Historical railways | |
| Llangynwyd; Line open, station closed. | Great Western Railway; Maesteg Line | Maesteg |
