= Garth Castle =

14th-century castle in Perth and Kinross, Scotland

Coordinates: 56°37′43″N 4°01′00″W

Garth Castle (Scottish Gaelic: Caisteal a' Chuilein Churta, transl. Castle of the fierce wolf) is a 14th-century castle in the form of a tower house and keep, located close to Coshieville in Glen Lyon in the council area of Perth and Kinross. Although the castle has a long and storied existence, it is Alexander Stewart, Earl of Buchan, the Wolf of Badenoch who is most associated with it, having died there in 1396.

== History ==
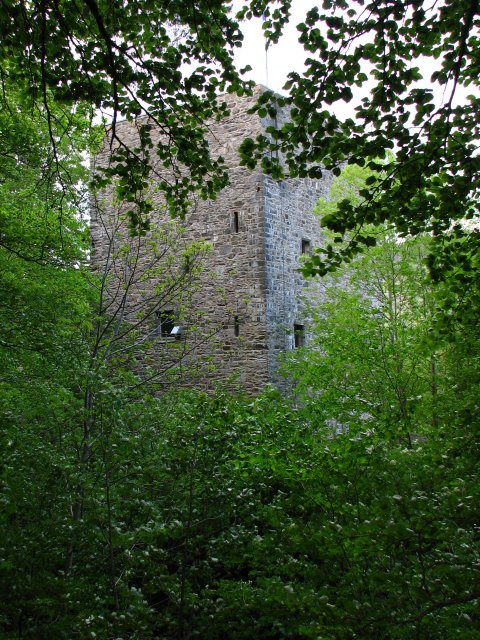
Garth Castle

Ruins of Garth Castle, painted by Andrew Brown Donaldson in 1849–1850

Garth Castle was built in 1384 by 1st Earl of Buchan, Alexander Stewart, who was 4th son of Robert II and grandson of Robert the Bruce. Major General David Stewart who suggested in his book Sketches of the Highlanders that James Stewart, of Fortingall & Garth, was the builder. For a century, the denizens of the castle were loyal to the Stewart kings, until the time of Neil "Gointe" Stewart, who became 4th laird of Fothergill, Garth and Kilbrochan in 1502.

On 31 January 1499, Neil Stewart, the 2nd Laid of Forthergill, died in Garth Castle and was buried in the graveyard of Dunkeld Cathedral. He was succeeded by Neil Stewart II, known as "The Red" Neil of Forthergill, i.e the 3rd Laid of Neil Stewart II, Mariota Stewart née M'Quein, second wife was swept away in a torrent in the Keltnie burn that protects the castle, on 16 August 1545. Neil Stewart II had two children, John Stewart and Marie Stewart. John Stewart succeeded him, as 4th Laird of Forthergill on 29 November 1554.

Fortifications would have likely surrounded the castle. However, in 1653 the Royalist revolt in Scotland against the Protectorate of Oliver Cromwell known as the Glencairn's rising began. A year later, Royalist Colonel Henry Wogan along with 30 of his men occupied that castle. The castle was put under siege by Cromwell and fired upon by cannon. Colonel Wogan and his men surrendered without much resistance. The castle drawbridge was destroyed along with the roof, which was burnt, resulting in the castle falling into ruin. It remained a ruin for more than 300 years. The inaccessibility of the castle, and large size of the stones used in its construction preserved the castle structure, unlike the fate that was suffered by similar dwellings and Clachan's in the Atholl area.

In 1880, the lands and estate of Garth Castle and the ruins of the castle itself along with Garth House were bought by Scottish ship magnate, Donald Currie. On 16 December 1880, Currie launched SS Garth Castle, a steamer built in Glasgow by Barclay, Curle & Co, and named in honour of the castle. Currie partially restored the castle by replacing walls that were badly damaged, in the natural style of the castle itself.

In the 1960s Garth Castle was purchased by a Mr Fry of Fry's chocolate for restoration as a holiday home. Little was known about him. The work was completed by a firm of local architects in Aberfeldy to Mr Fry's own design but was found by Fry to be unsatisfactory and the English architect Leonard Manasseh was employed, late in the project, to create a more acceptable result.

== Construction ==
Garth castle is built on a small grass covered knoll, which is nearly isolated from the adjacent fields by two deep ravines, through which flow two minor, but fast flowing streams, that are tributaries of the Keltnie burn. These streams unite a few yards below, or to the south of the promontory on which the castle stands; and the conjoint stream thence flows for several hundred metres through a finely wooded and picturesque ravine, unit it rejoins the Keltnie, about a mile above where the Keltnie burn joins the River Lyon.

The tower is square in design, an architecture style termed donjon (keep), with walls constructed of a mix of unhewn boulders and quarried stones. The walls range from 6 1/2 to 12 feet (2.0 to 3.7 m) in thickness, rising to the parapet height at 60 feet (18 m).
