= Garker =

Hamlet in Cornwall, England

Coordinates: 50.360°N 4.754°W

Garker: Cornish: Karker
- Hamlet
- Location within Cornwall
- Unitary authority: Cornwall
- Region: South West
- Country: England
- Sovereign state: United Kingdom
- Police: Devon and Cornwall
- Fire: Cornwall
- Ambulance: South Western

Garker (Cornish: Karker) is a hamlet situated 3 miles (4.8 km) north-east of St Austell in Cornwall, England. Garker lies close to the western edge of the Eden Project visitor attraction. Garker is in the civil parish of Treverbyn.
