= Garth, Ceredigion =

Village in Ceredigion, Wales

Coordinates: 52.439070°N 3.987890°W

Garth
- Location within Ceredigion
- OS grid reference: SN 6497 8420
  - Cardiff: 74.6 mi (120.1 km)
  - London: 176.3 mi (283.7 km)
- Community: Trefeurig
- Principal area: Ceredigion
- Country: Wales
- Sovereign state: United Kingdom
- Post town: Aberystwyth
- Postcode district: SY23
- Police: Dyfed-Powys
- Fire: Mid and West Wales
- Ambulance: Welsh
- UK Parliament: Ceredigion Preseli
- Senedd Cymru – Welsh Parliament: Ceredigion

Garth is a small village in the community of Trefeurig, Ceredigion, Wales, which is 74.6 miles (120.1 km) from Cardiff and 176.3 miles (283.7 km) from London. Garth is represented in the Senedd by Elin Jones (Plaid Cymru) and is part of the Ceredigion Preseli constituency in the House of Commons.

== See also ==
- List of localities in Wales by population
