= Garth, Bridgend =

Village in Bridgend County Borough, Wales

Coordinates: 51.602°N 3.640°W

Garth: Welsh: Garth
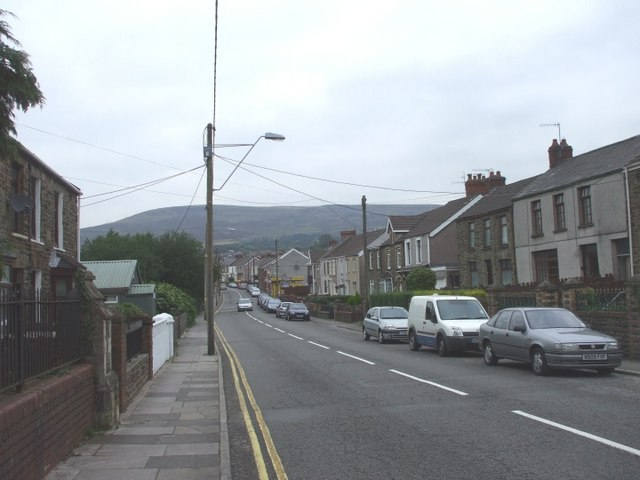
- Bridgend Road, Garth, 2008

- Location within Bridgend
- OS grid reference: SS865905
- Community: Maesteg
- Principal area: Bridgend
- Preserved county: Mid Glamorgan
- Country: Wales
- Sovereign state: United Kingdom
- Post town: MAESTEG
- Postcode district: CF34
- Dialling code: 01656
- Police: South Wales
- Fire: South Wales
- Ambulance: Welsh
- UK Parliament: Aberafan Maesteg
- Senedd Cymru – Welsh Parliament: Ogmore

Garth is a village in Bridgend County Borough, Wales. Garth is situated to the east of the town of Maesteg, and lies at the northernmost end of the Llynfi Valley. During the 19th century Garth was an industrial coal-mining village which contained its own colliery, the Garth Merthyr Colliery.

== History ==
Before the 19th century, Garth like much of the Llynfi Valley was a rural area with sparsely populated farmhouses and labouring settlements. With the opening of two ironworks at Maesteg at the start of the century, the gradual industrialization saw the construction of villages in the area, including Garth. Garth built up as a series of terrace houses to the east of the larger settlement of Maesteg, on the eastern bank of the River Llynfi, mainly to provide home for the labourers of the emerging coal industry at two local collieries Garth and Oakwood.

In 1864 John Brogden & Sons leased the land at Garth and bought Garth Fach and Cwmdu Canol Farms. On that land they sank a colliery in 1865 and constructed a large number of coke ovens at the surface. An underground explosion occurred at the mine in 1867, and although no one was injured the mine was closed for a year. The company continued to work the mine until the long depression forced the mines closure in 1877. The mine re-opened under the ownership of the Tondu and Ogmore coal and Iron company. But by 1884 it again swapped hands, form this point being run by the Garth Merthyr Colliery Company. In an 1896 report by the Inspector of Mines, the colliery is named as the Garth Merthyr Colliery and was recorded as employing 504 men, extracting both house and steam coal.

On 11 June 1897 nine men and boys were killed in a colliery disaster caused by a cage drop. The cage carrying the men leaving their shift overwound as it reached the top causing the cable lifting the cage to snap. There was nothing left to support the cage and plummeted 350 yards to the bottom of the shaft. Five men and four boys were killed instantly. It was reported that one man, Thomas Rees, survived the accident after being pushed out of the cage before it began its ascent.

The proximity of the Garth and Oakwood mines saw them link underground from 1901. The Garth pit was used as the downcast shafts and the Oakwood as the upcast shafts to provide ventilation for the miners of both collieries. Oakwood, which also began work in 1864, had its pithead located to the west of the River Llynfi. Although not located in Garth, the Oakwood Pit explosion of 1872 which killed 11 repairers, included members of the Garth community.

In 1908, at its peak, the Garth colliery had a workforce of 1,075. The number of people employed gradually decreased over the next two decades, with 730 in 1918 and 688 in 1923. In 1930 Garth Colliery closed for good, two years after the cessation of mining in nearby Oakwood.

== Transport ==
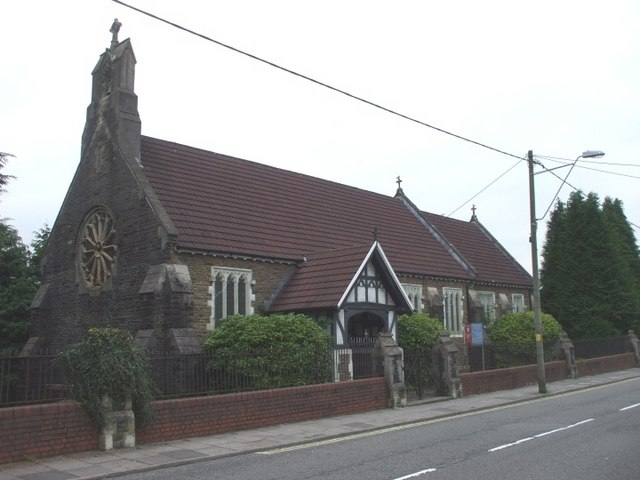
St Mary the Virgin

The main road through Garth is the B4282, which consists of Mill Road, Bridgend Road and Castle Street. It connects at both ends to the A4063. In 1970 Troedyrhiew Garth, the village sole railway station was closed down. A new station was opened at a different location in 1992, known as Garth or sometime Garth (Bridgend).

== Buildings of note ==
Newman selects two structures of note within Garth, both religious buildings. St Mary the Virgin (1891) is described as a 'pretty little stone faced building' with stained glass windows in the grisaille style with lilies on the borders. The west window centres on the Name of Jesus. Libanus Welsh Calvinistic Methodist Church was built in 1871. It is stone faced and classical in style. The interior has galleries on three sides and on the fourth, behind the pulpit, there is dramatic double-depth arch on marbled columns.

== Bibliography ==
- Newman, John (1995). Glamorgan. London: Penguin Group. ISBN 0140710566.
