= Gardham =

Hamlet in the East Riding of Yorkshire, England

Coordinates: 53.868304°N 0.548387°W

- Location within the East Riding of Yorkshire
- OS grid reference: SE955423
  - London: 160 mi (260 km) S
- Civil parish: Cherry Burton
- Unitary authority: East Riding of Yorkshire
- Ceremonial county: East Riding of Yorkshire
- Region: Yorkshire and the Humber
- Country: England
- Sovereign state: United Kingdom
- Post town: BEVERLEY
- Postcode district: HU17
- Dialling code: 01964
- Police: Humberside
- Fire: Humberside
- Ambulance: Yorkshire
- UK Parliament: Beverley and Holderness

Gardham or Low Gardham is a small hamlet in the East Riding of Yorkshire, England. It is situated approximately 5 miles (8 km) west of Beverley town centre and 2 miles (3.2 km) west of the village of Cherry Burton. 1.5 miles (2.4 km) to the north-east lies Etton.

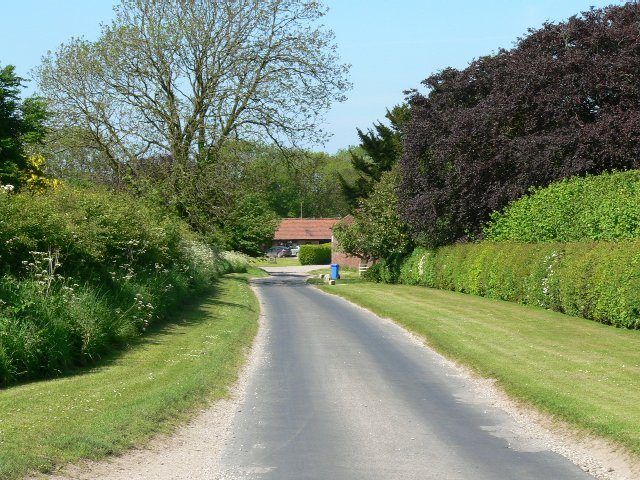
Entering Gardham

Gardham forms part of the civil parish of Cherry Burton.
