= Cheltenham railway station =

Cheltenham railway station or Cheltenham station may refer to:

- 79th Street/Cheltenham station in Chicago, Illinois, United States
- Cheltenham station (SEPTA) in Cheltenham, Pennsylvania, United States
- Cheltenham railway station, Melbourne, Victoria, Australia
- Cheltenham railway station, Sydney, New South Wales, Australia
- Cheltenham railway station, Adelaide, South Australia
- Cheltenham Spa railway station, in the United Kingdom
- Cheltenham Racecourse railway station, Adelaide, South Australia (closed)
- Cheltenham Racecourse railway station (now on the Gloucestershire Warwickshire Railway), in the United Kingdom
- Disused railway stations in the United Kingdom:
  - Cheltenham High Street railway station
  - Cheltenham High Street Halt railway station
  - Cheltenham South and Leckhampton railway station
  - Cheltenham Spa Malvern Road railway station
  - Cheltenham Spa St. James railway station
