= Churchdown =

Village in Gloucestershire, England

Coordinates: 51.88°N 02.17°W

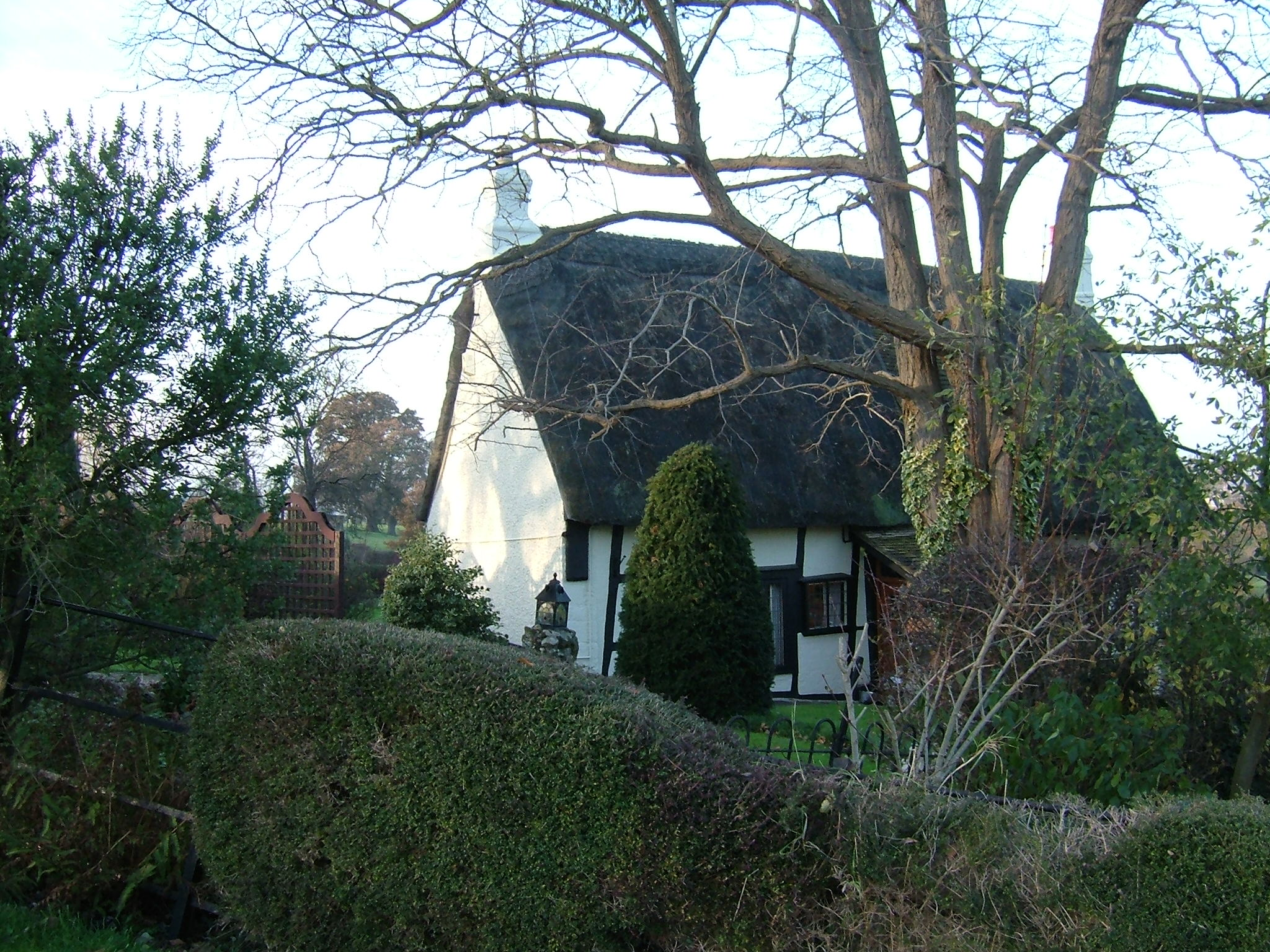
- The Old School House building at The Green in Churchdown

- Location within Gloucestershire
- Population: 10,990 (2011)
- OS grid reference: ST779869
- District: Tewkesbury
- Shire county: Gloucestershire
- Region: South West
- Country: England
- Sovereign state: United Kingdom
- Post town: GLOUCESTER
- Postcode district: GL3
- Dialling code: 01452
- Police: Gloucestershire
- Fire: Gloucestershire
- Ambulance: South Western
- UK Parliament: North Cotswolds

Churchdown is a large village in Gloucestershire, England, situated between Gloucester and Cheltenham in the south of the Tewkesbury Borough.

The village has two centres. The older (Brookfield or "village") centre is in Church Road near St Andrew's Church; the more suburban centre is in St John's Avenue near St John's Church. Churchdown is a relatively large village, with a population of 11,261 (2001), reducing to 10,990 at the 2011 census. The village has a size of approximately 16.5 km^{2} (exactly 4,076 acres). Accordingly, the population density is 666 persons/km^{2}.

== Location ==
Churchdown is located in a semi-rural environment; so close to Gloucester and Cheltenham, but surrounded on three sides by open countryside. Churchdown borders Imjin Barracks and the district of Innsworth to the North West.

== Etymology ==
The name Churchdown is first attested in the Domesday Book of 1086, as Circesdvne, with forms such as Chyrchesdoun appearing from the twelfth century. Scholars agree that the second element of the name is the Old English word dūn ("hill"). Traditionally, the first element has been taken to be a Brittonic word corresponding to Proto-Welsh *crüc ("hillock"), in which case the name is tautological: English-speakers encountered a hill known in Brittonic as crüc, took it as a place-name, and added their own word for "hill". However, the 2004 Cambridge Dictionary of English Place-Names argues that "the parish church is on top of a hill which does not have the distinctive profile of the kind of hill called cryc from PrW *crüc", arguing instead that the name comes from a masculine variant of the Old English feminine noun cirice ("church") and thus that it meant "church's hill".

== Churchdown Hill ==
A local landmark is Churchdown Hill (also known locally as Chosen Hill), which rises to 155 metres (510 ft) above sea level and has views across the Severn Vale and to the Cotswolds, Gloucester, Cheltenham, the Malvern Hills, and into Worcestershire.

The hill is home to the historic sites of Mussell Well, the "Roman" Steps, St Bartholomew's Church, also an analogue and now a DAB radio transmitter broadcasting BBC Radio Gloucestershire and two reservoirs operated by Severn Trent Water.

Churchdown Hill is supported by a local group called The Friends of Churchdown Hill. The Friends were active in the establishment of the Woodland Trust's Churchdown Hill Nature Reserves and have published a walking guide and map to the hill.

=== Nature reserves ===
Parts of Churchdown Hill are managed by the Woodland Trust and are open freely to the public.

=== Administrative ===
Churchdown is within the parliamentary constituency of North Cotswolds. At a local government level, Churchdown is represented as two wards - Churchdown Brookfield (the southern half of Churchdown also known locally as Churchdown Village) and Churchdown St John's (the northern half near St John's church). The boundary between the two wards is the A40 Golden Valley Bypass road. Prior to Brexit in 2020, it was in the South West Region for the European Parliament.

== Transport and travel ==
Churchdown has long benefited from a convenient location along routes between larger settlements. The Gloucester and Cheltenham Tramroad brought prosperity to the northern (St John's) end of the village. This was succeeded by a road between Cheltenham and Gloucester along a similar route (called Cheltenham Road East as it traverses Churchdown), which was once part of the main trunk road from London to Fishguard. This road now provides access to Cheltenham and Gloucester, and also to the M5 via the Golden Valley Bypass section of the A40. There are some Segregated Bicycle Paths but there are sections which do not connect with each other and have poor design.

=== Rail ===
From 1874 until 1964 Churchdown was served by a Churchdown railway station on the main line between Birmingham and Bristol. There are some remains of the station itself next to what is now Station Close, but only through rail traffic continues today on the Cross Country Route for example.

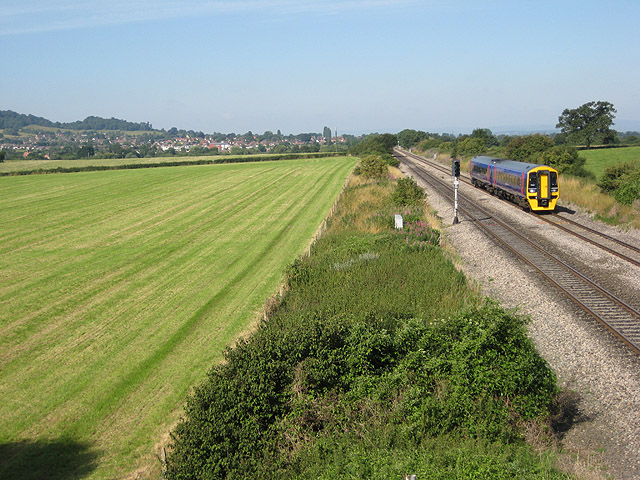
Travelling by train from Gloucester to Cheltenham Spa and not calling at the currently closed Churchdown railway station.

=== Air ===
Churchdown is adjacent to Gloucestershire Airport, still known locally as Staverton. Light aircraft are a regular feature in the skies above the village, and occasionally military aircraft past and present. For the last ten years, the airport is regularly used as a helicopter training base for police and military purposes.

=== Bus ===
Local bus services are operated by Stagecoach West. Three services pass through Churchdown: The 94 between Cheltenham and Gloucester passes through on Cheltenham Road east, every 10 minutes. There are also the 97/98 routes, which also run between Cheltenham and Gloucester, but take a different, longer route between the two towns. In the village, the 97 runs via Parton Road and the 98 via Pirton Lane.

== Local information ==
=== Magazines ===
Residents enjoy the Churchdown Magazine, which is produced bimonthly and is delivered free of charge to 5,100 households. It includes articles of local interest, advertisements and details of local events, and has been in print since 1974.

Since 2010, residents also receive MyChurchdown magazine, delivered free of charge and bi-monthly. This full colour glossy magazine is accompanied by a website and social media presence, sharing news, events, adverts, notices and articles and features of interest to local residents.

== Education ==
See also List of schools in Gloucestershire

Churchdown has six schools, including two secondary schools - Churchdown School Academy and Chosen Hill School. There are also several primary schools; Churchdown Parton Manor Infant and Junior Schools, St Mary's Catholic School and Churchdown Village Infant and Junior Schools.

== Sport and leisure ==
Churchdown has an eighteen-hole golf course and driving range on its outskirts at Brickhampton, and an inline and skateboard facility at Churchdown Park. Churchdown also boasts numerous football pitches and rugby pitches, as well as sports halls at both Churchdown and Chosen Hill schools.

Youth football is active through the Churchdown Panthers, who play mostly in the Cheltenham FA league.

The Chosen Hill Former Pupils rugby club first team plays in the South West League and has an active youth section.

Prior to the First World War, a golf course operated between the railway line and Churchdown Hill, with a club house adjacent on Pirton Lane. The area is now open farmland. The nine golf holes had names; The Gate, The Spinney, Spion Kop, The Crab, Khyrats Oak, Oystershells Green, The Saddle, Rabbits Hill and The Railway Home.

== Churches ==
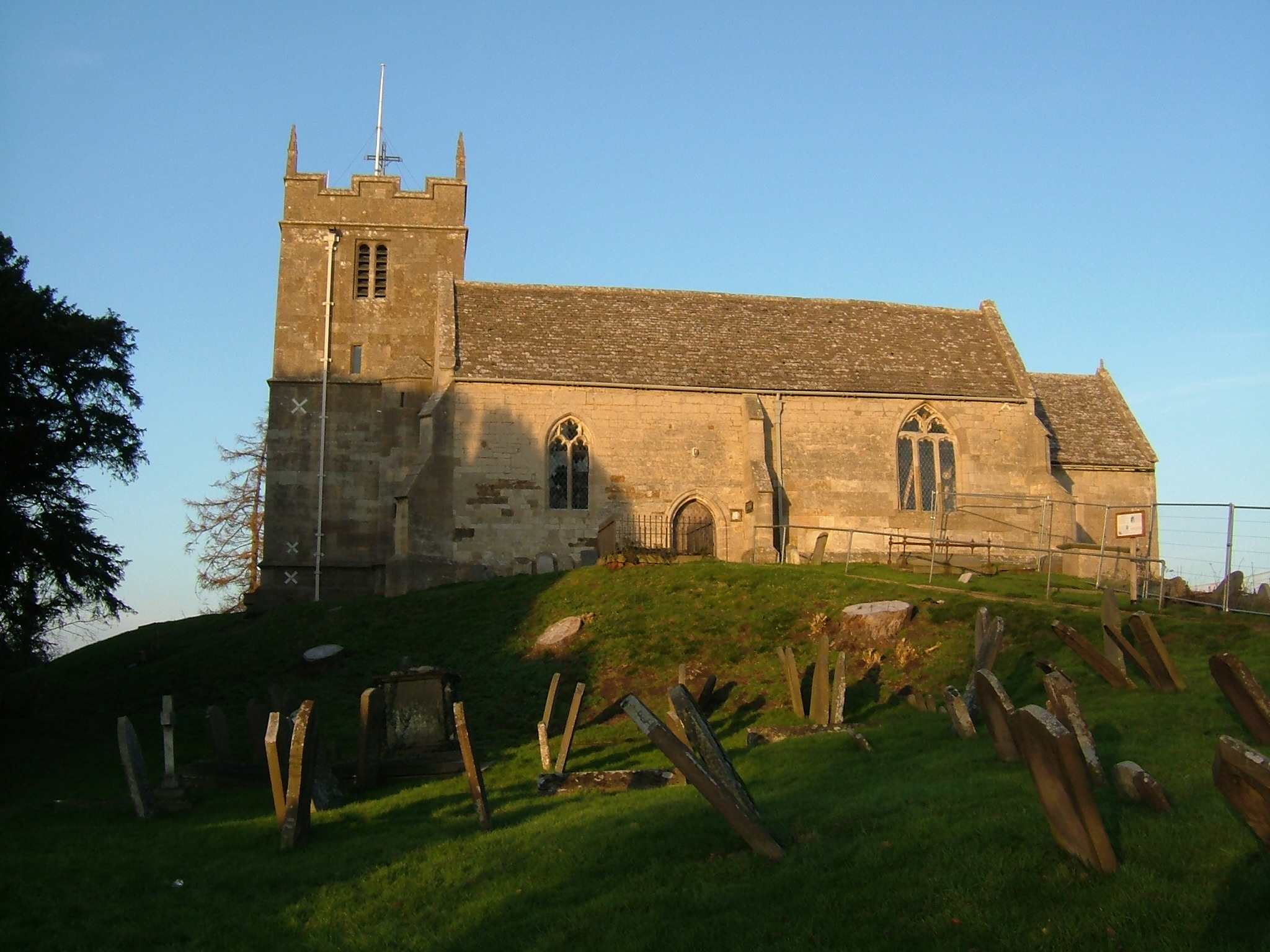
St Bartholemew's Church, on top of Churchdown Hill

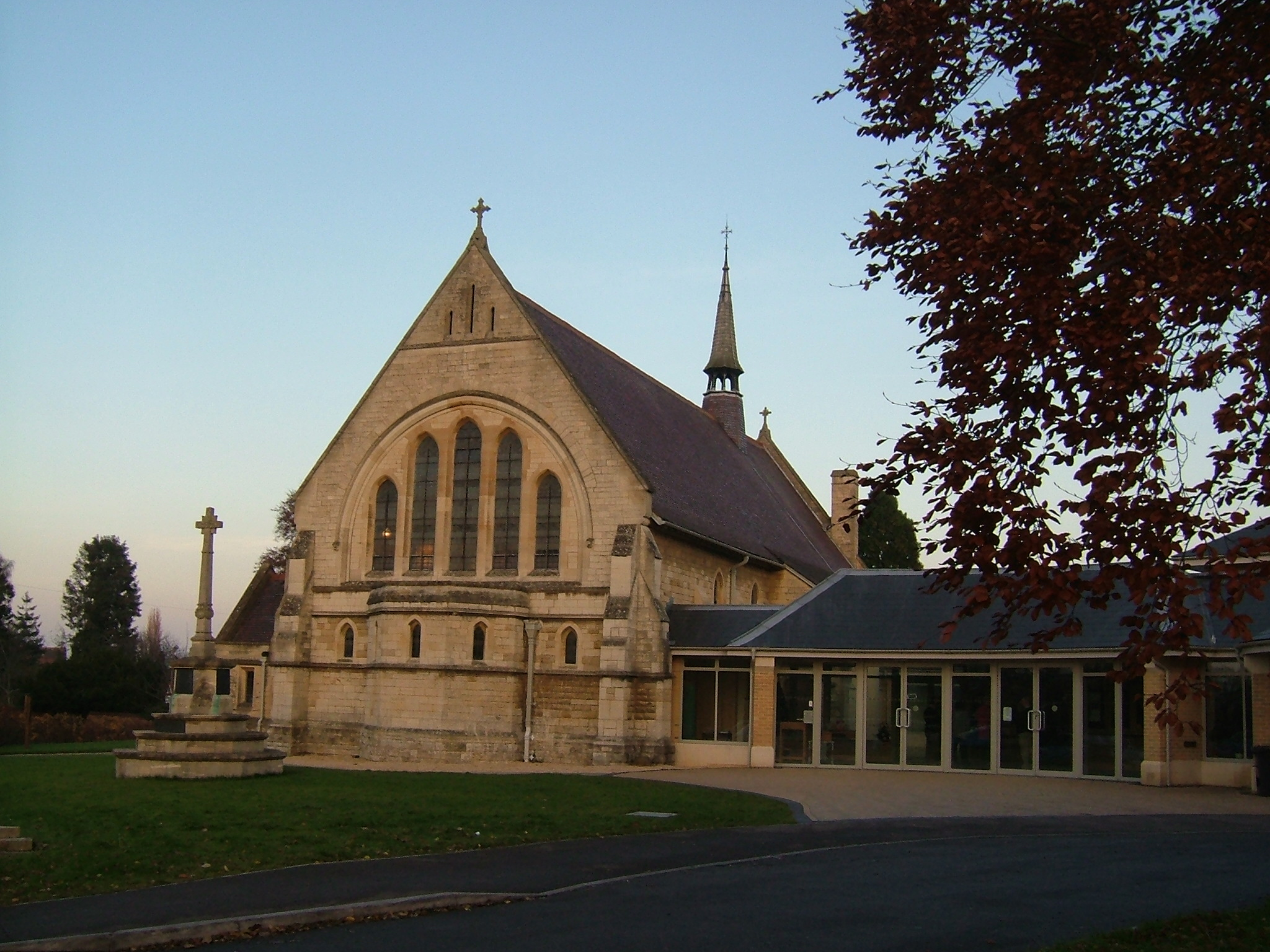
St Andrew's Church, in Churchdown Village

See also List of churches in Gloucestershire

Churchdown has three Church of England Churches: St John's, St Andrew's and St Bartholomew's. There is also the Catholic Church of Our Lady of Perpetual Succour on Cheltenham Road East, and Churchdown Methodist Church on Chapel Hay Lane. St Bartholomew's is on the top of Churchdown Hill, built upon the site of a pre-Christian, Iron Age settlement.

== Historic buildings ==
Churchdown has several interesting old structures including the Old School House on The Green, where the first village school was held, Ye Old House on Sandfield Road (thought to have been built in the 16th century), Dunstan Cottage in Chapel Hay Lane and The Cottage on Oldbury Orchard.

On The Green stands a house where Beatrix Potter stayed, when she visited Gloucester in 1901, hence her famous story The Tailor of Gloucester.

== Other information ==
The village has two main rows of shops and two pubs - the Hare and Hounds near St John's, and the Old Elm near St Andrew's. There is also a Social Club (Churchdown Club) located in Church Road where games of bowls skittles and tennis take place, and Churchdown Community Centre on Parton Road which houses Churchdown Social Club, and in which various functions are held and skittles on two alleys. The formerly thriving row of shops on St. John's Avenue are known locally as "The Avey". This road is also where the local GP practise used to be. There was also a branch of HSBC, a Co-operative shop and many years ago there was also a greengrocers called Tredgetts, where local children who attended Churchdown Parton Manor infants school would go to purchase their fruits for their breaktime snack.

Composer Herbert Howells dedicated his Piano Quartet "to the hill at Chosen and Ivor Gurney who knows it", referring to Churchdown Hill. The hill was also the direct inspiration for his 'Chosen Tune', dedicated to his fiancée who lived at Churchdown.

It is often assumed that the boundary between Churchdown and Innsworth is at the Hare and Hounds public house at the Parton Road / Cheltenham Road (B 4063) junction. However, this is an incorrect assumption. Innsworth actually begins at the roundabout where Innsworth Lane and Highgrove Way branch off. I.e. H., all of the housing development south-west of Imjin Barracks and between Innsworth Lane and Cheltenham Road is still part of Churchdown.

== Publications ==
- "Churchdown Gloucester - Official Guide" 1 363642002X5 hardback, also paperback, 1975, "by order of the Parish Council", Forward Publicity Ltd, no author marked, copy held at Churchdown library
- "The Story of Churchdown", Gwen Waters, ISBN 0-904586-04-9, Gloucester Reprints, 1999
