= Cleeve railway station =

Former railway station in Gloucestershire, England

Cleeve
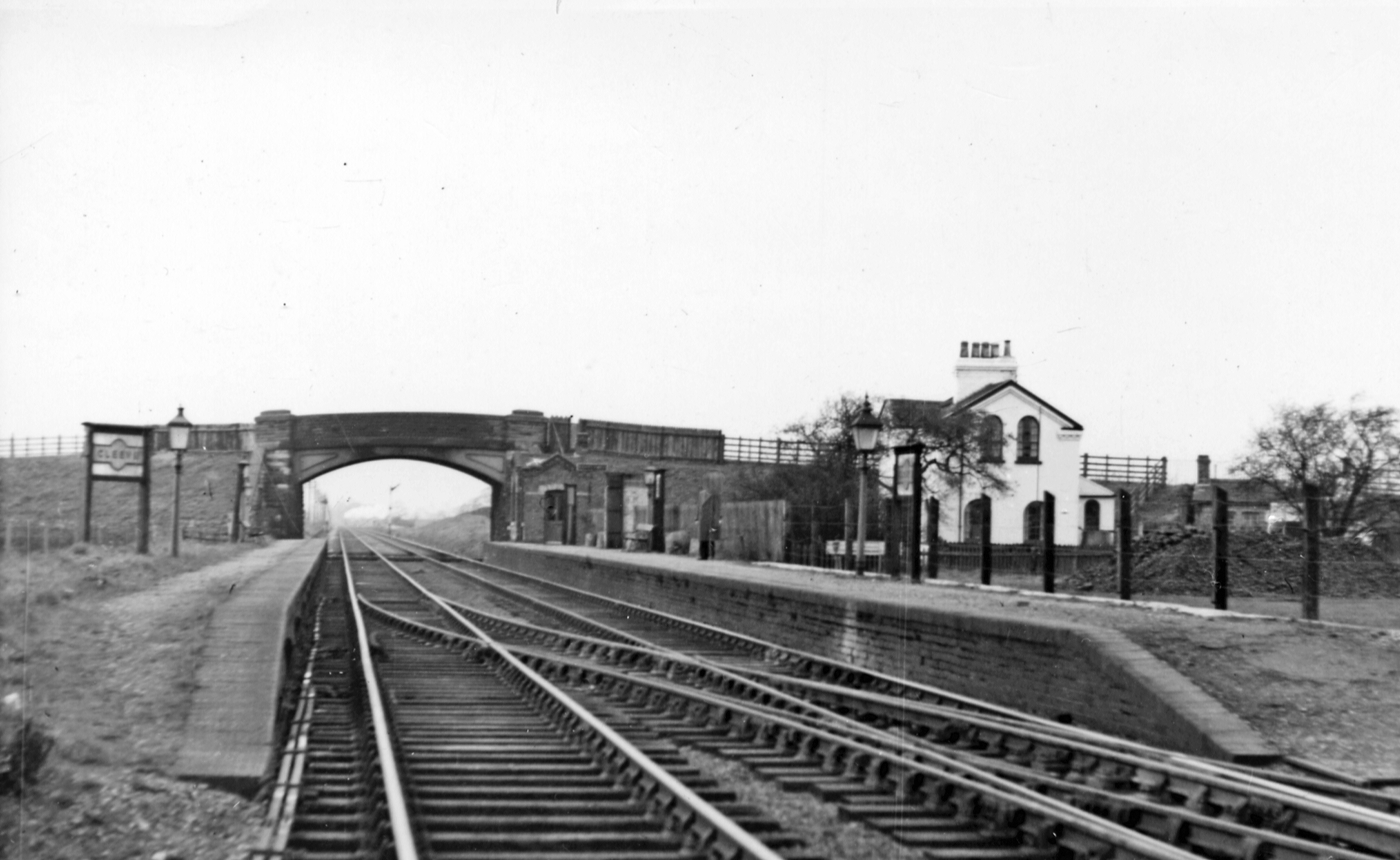
- Cleeve station, 1950

General information
- Location: Stoke Orchard, Gloucestershire; England
- Coordinates: 51.9500°N 2.0990°W
- Grid reference: SO932279
- Platforms: 2

Other information
- Status: Disused

History
- Original company: Birmingham and Gloucester Railway
- Pre-grouping: Midland Railway
- Post-grouping: London, Midland and Scottish Railway

Key dates
- 1841: Opened
- 20 February 1950: Closed to passengers
- 1960: Closed for freight
Location

Cleeve railway station was a station in Stoke Orchard, Gloucestershire, England. The station was named for the nearby village of Bishop's Cleeve.

== History ==
The station was opened in 1841, closed to passengers in 1950 and closed completely in 1960.

== Stationmasters ==
- Mr. Mayhew ca. 1850
- W. Overbury until 1860
- J. Furniss from 1861
- H. Mabbott until 1877
- James Hadley 1877- 1903
- F.A. Done 1903 - 1905
- J. Harford 1905 - 1908
- W. Sugars from 1908
- Herbert Best 1909 - 1911 (afterwards station master at Rubery)
- Leslie Jones ca. 1946

Preceding station	Disused railways	Following station
Swindon (Glos)	Birmingham and Gloucester Railway	Ashchurch
Cheltenham High Street	London, Midland and Scottish Railway	Ashchurch
