= Badgworth railway station =

Short-lived railway station in Badgeworth, Gloucestershire

Coordinates: 51.8843°N 2.1425°W

Badgeworth

General information
- Location: Badgeworth, Gloucestershire; England

Other information
- Status: Disused

History
- Original company: Birmingham and Gloucester Railway
- Pre-grouping: Midland Railway

Key dates
- 22 August 1843: Opened
- October 1846: Closed

Badgworth railway station served the village of Badgeworth, Gloucestershire, England, from 1843 to 1846 on the Birmingham and Gloucester Railway.

== History ==
The station was opened on 22 August 1843 by the Birmingham and Gloucester Railway. It was a short-lived station, closing three years later in October 1846.

Preceding station	Disused railways	Following station
Churchdown	Birmingham and Gloucester Railway	Lansdown (Cheltenham Spa)
