= Churchdown railway station =

Former railway station in England

Coordinates: 51.88075°N 2.16714°W

Churchdown
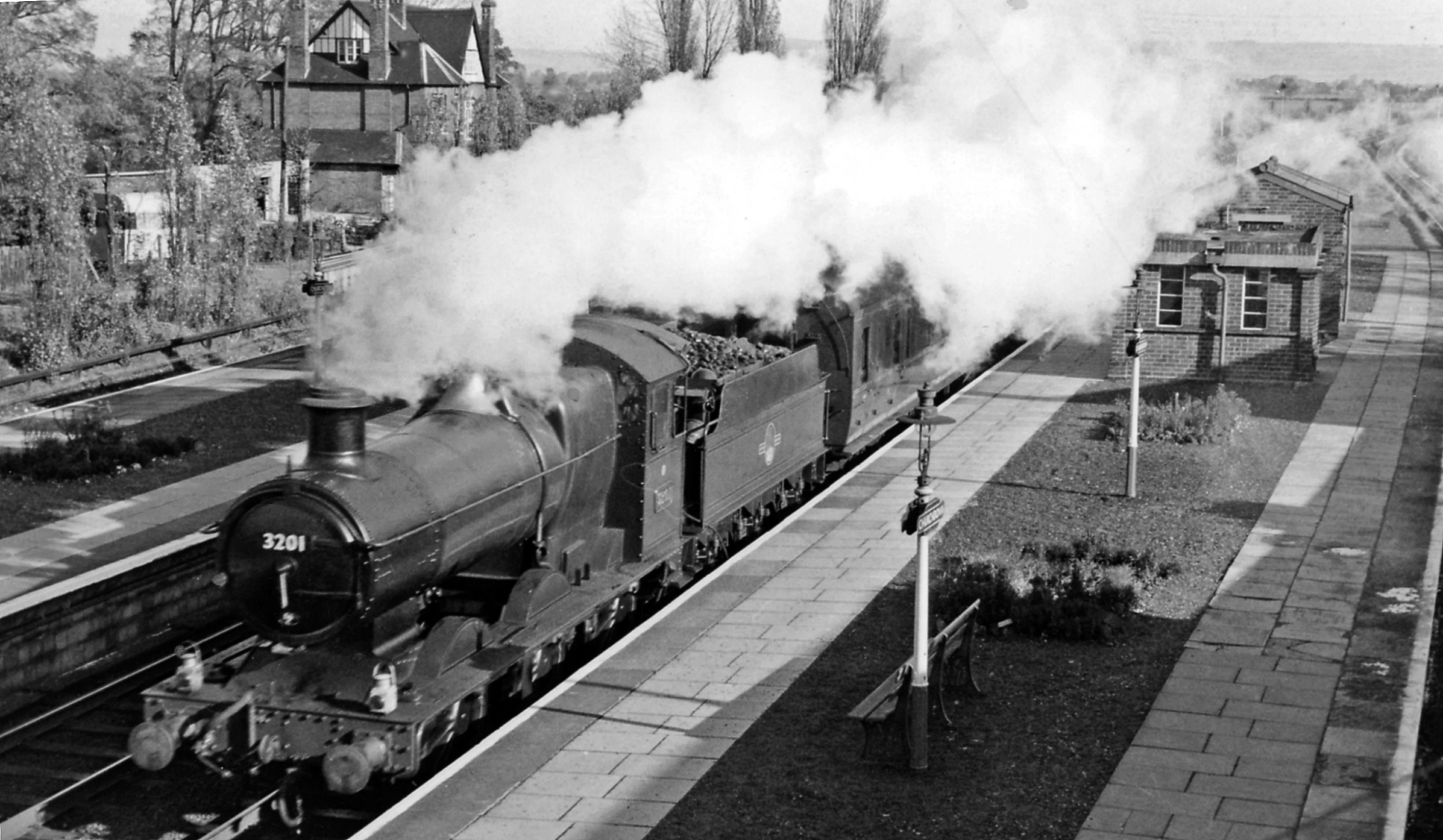
- Cheltenham - Paddington express passing Churchdown station in 1961

General information
- Location: Churchdown, Tewkesbury; England
- Grid reference: SO886202
- Platforms: 4

Other information
- Status: Disused

History
- Original company: Birmingham and Gloucester Railway
- Pre-grouping: Midland Railway/Great Western Railway
- Post-grouping: London, Midland and Scottish Railway/Great Western Railway

Key dates
- 9 August 1842: Opened
- 27 September 1842: Closed
- 2 February 1874: Re-opened
- 2 November 1964: Closed
Location

Churchdown railway station was situated on the main line between Gloucester and Cheltenham Spa. It served Churchdown and surrounding areas.

== History ==
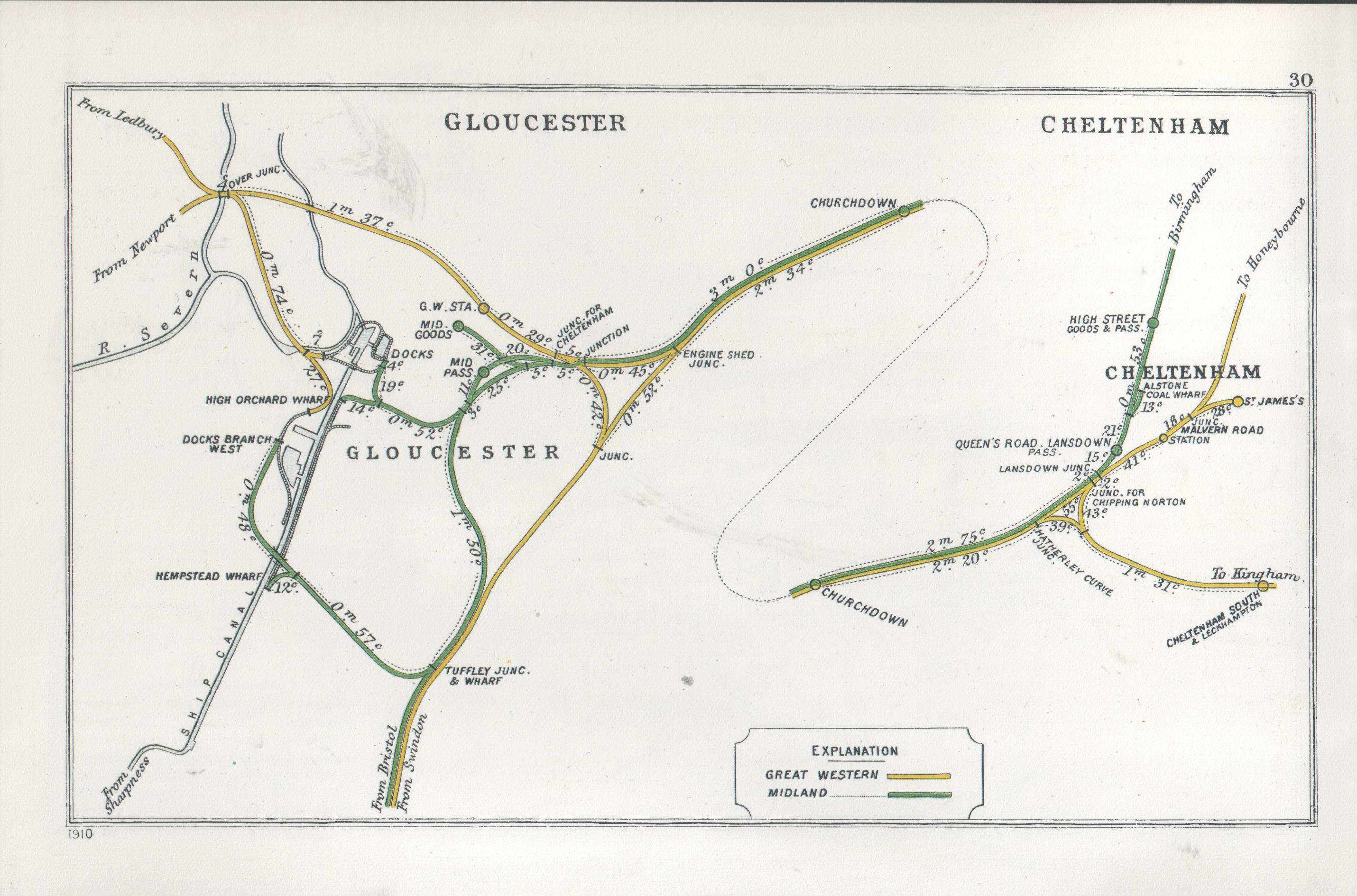
A 1910 Railway Clearing House map of railways in the vicinity of Churchdown

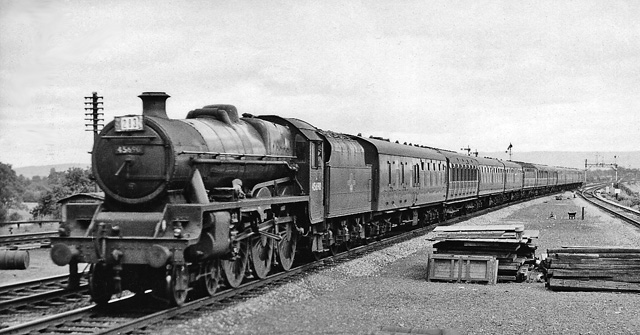
'Jubilee' Class 4-6-0 'Leander' passing Churchdown in 1960

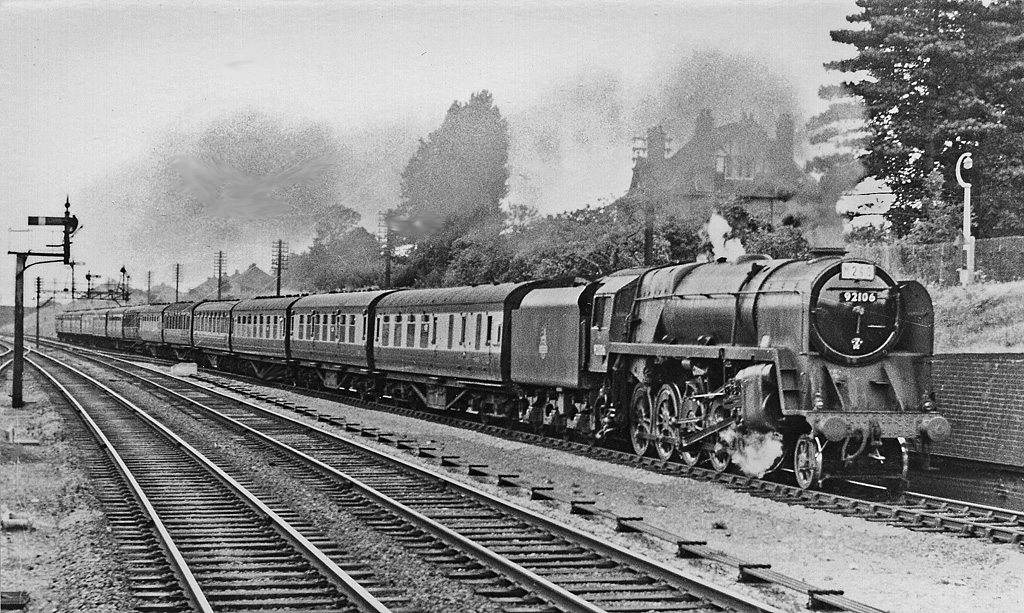
Up holiday express from Torbay near Churchdown in 1957

The railway line between Cheltenham and Gloucester opened on 4 November 1840, the final section of the Birmingham and Gloucester Railway (B&G) which had been authorised in 1836. At first, there were no intermediate stations, but on 9 August 1842 the first station at Churchdown was opened by the B&G; it proved to be temporary, being closed again on 27 September. Less than a year later, on 22 August 1843, a station opened closer to Cheltenham at nearby Badgworth. Both stations were built in response to request from the residents of Badgeworth for a station closer than Cheltenham or Gloucester; Churchdown was the first choice of the railway company since it was closer to the half-way point between the two towns.

The permanent station at Churchdown was opened on 2 February 1874, and was the joint property of the Midland Railway (successor to the B&G) and the Great Western Railway, who had shared the line since 1847.

The station closed on 2 November 1964, as part of the reshaping of British Railways or more commonly known as the Beeching Axe by Dr Beeching.

The site of the station is 89 miles 65 chains (144.5 km) from Derby. Little remains of the station itself next to what is now Station Close, but through traffic continues on the line.

Preceding station	Disused railways	Following station
Cheltenham Malvern Road	Great Western Railway; Cheltenham and Great Western Union Railway	Gloucester
Gloucester	Birmingham and Gloucester Railway	Badgworth
Gloucester Eastgate	Midland Railway	Cheltenham Spa (Lansdown)
