= Cheltenham Leckhampton railway station =

Former railway station in Gloucestershire, England

Coordinates: 51.88307°N 2.07777°W

Cheltenham Leckhampton
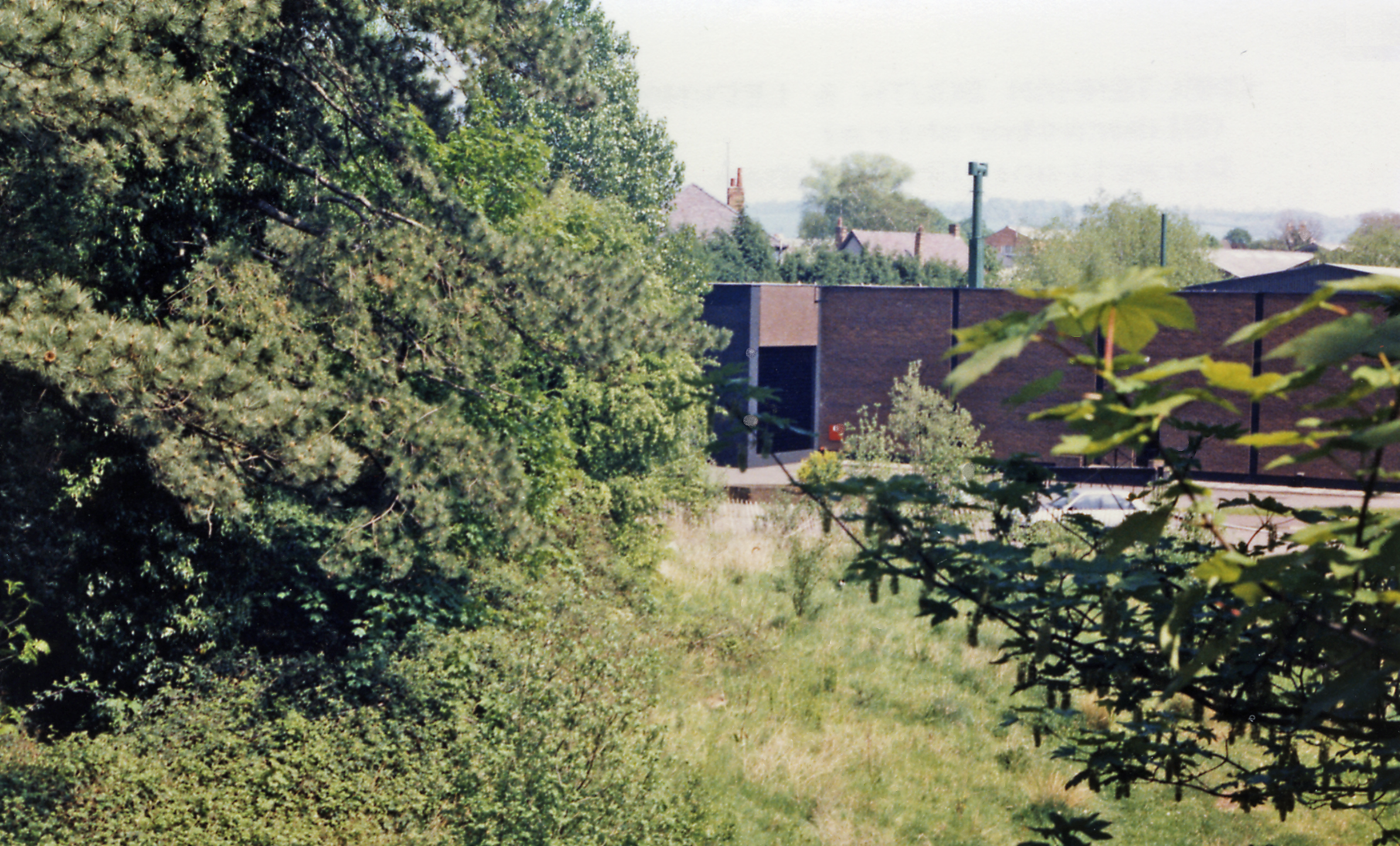
- Site of Cheltenham Leckhampton station in May 1987

General information
- Location: Leckhampton, Cheltenham; England
- Grid reference: SO948204
- Platforms: 2

Other information
- Status: Disused

History
- Original company: Banbury and Cheltenham Direct Railway
- Pre-grouping: Great Western Railway
- Post-grouping: GWR

Key dates
- 1 June 1881: Opened as Leckhampton
- 1 May 1906: Renamed Cheltenham South and Leckhampton
- April 1952: Renamed Cheltenham Leckhampton
- 15 October 1962: Closed
Location

Cheltenham Leckhampton railway station in Gloucestershire served the village of Leckhampton and the southern outskirts of Cheltenham Spa.

== History ==
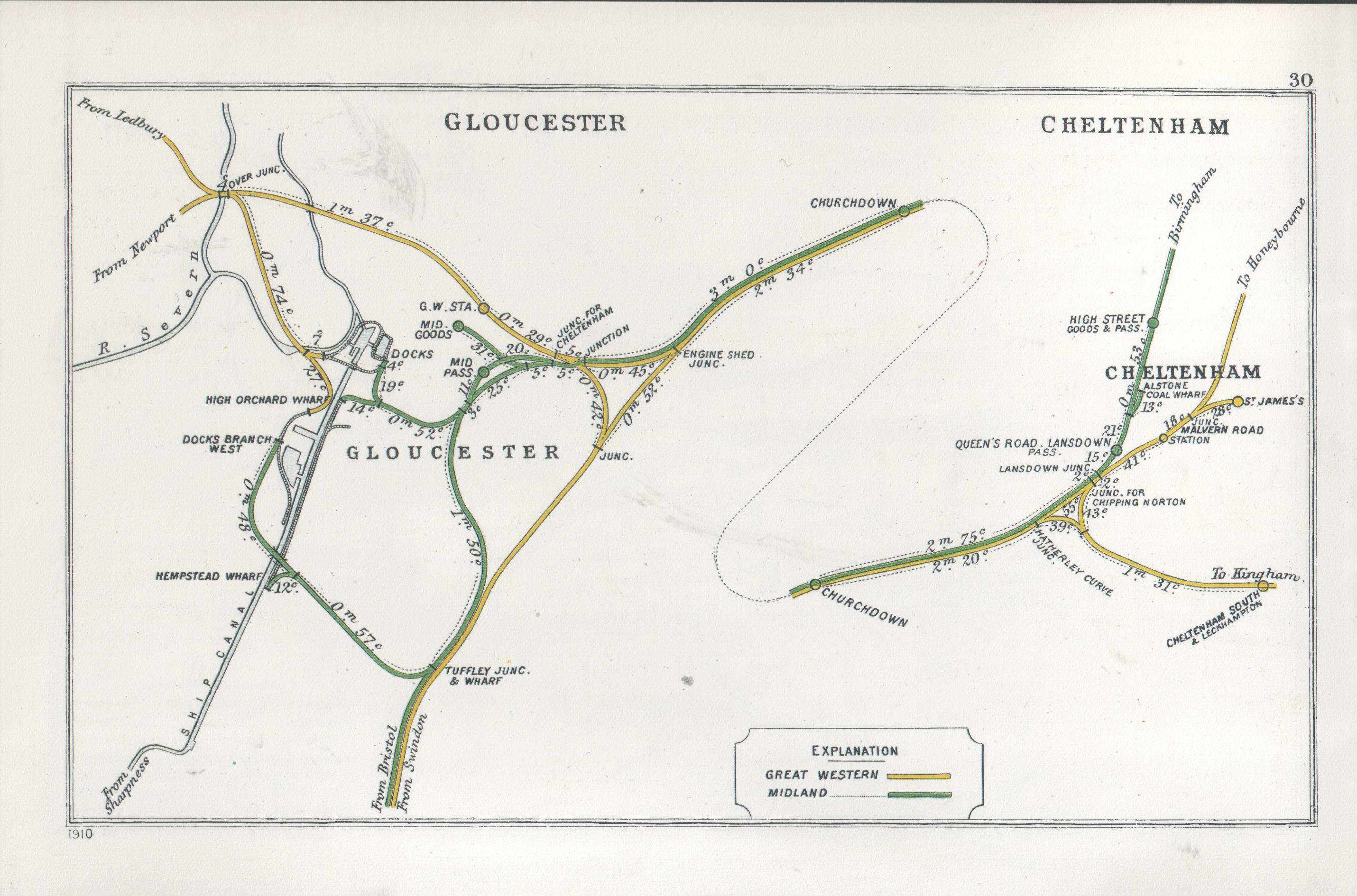
A 1910 Railway Clearing House map of railways in the vicinity of Cheltenham South and Leckhampton

The station began operating in 1881 with the opening of the Bourton-on-the-Water to Cheltenham section of the Banbury and Cheltenham Direct Railway. This was run by the Great Western Railway which thereafter took over full responsibility for it.

From 1891 the station was also served by trains on the Midland and South Western Junction Railway line, which branched off the Banbury and Cheltenham line at Andoversford, forming a north–south link from Cheltenham to Swindon, Andover and the south coast. The M&SWJR had running rights over the GWR line.

The station was originally called Leckhampton, acquiring its longer name in 1906. This was due to the through express train service between Newcastle and Swansea that was routed along the Banbury to Cheltenham line: the express did not pass through any of the main Cheltenham stations, and the renaming of Leckhampton was intended to show passengers that there was a Cheltenham service on the train. It was renamed Cheltenham Leckhampton in 1952.

It was a small station with a brick building. The line through it was particularly busy during the First World War and the Second World War with heavy troop and machinery movements on the M&SWJR. Traffic declined rapidly thereafter.

The M&SWJR line closed to passenger traffic in September 1961, and services on the Banbury to Cheltenham line were withdrawn on 15 October 1962, when the station closed. The site of the station is now occupied by Leckhampton Place, a residential development, and Liddington Park Industrial Estate; both accessed via Old Station Drive.

Preceding station	Disused railways	Following station
Cheltenham Lansdown; Line closed, station open	Great Western Railway; Midland and South Western Junction Railway	Charlton Kings; Line and station closed
Cheltenham (Malvern Road); Line and station closed	Great Western Railway; Banbury and Cheltenham Direct Railway	Charlton Kings; Line and station closed
