= Cheltenham Spa railway station =

Railway station in Gloucestershire, England

Cheltenham Spa
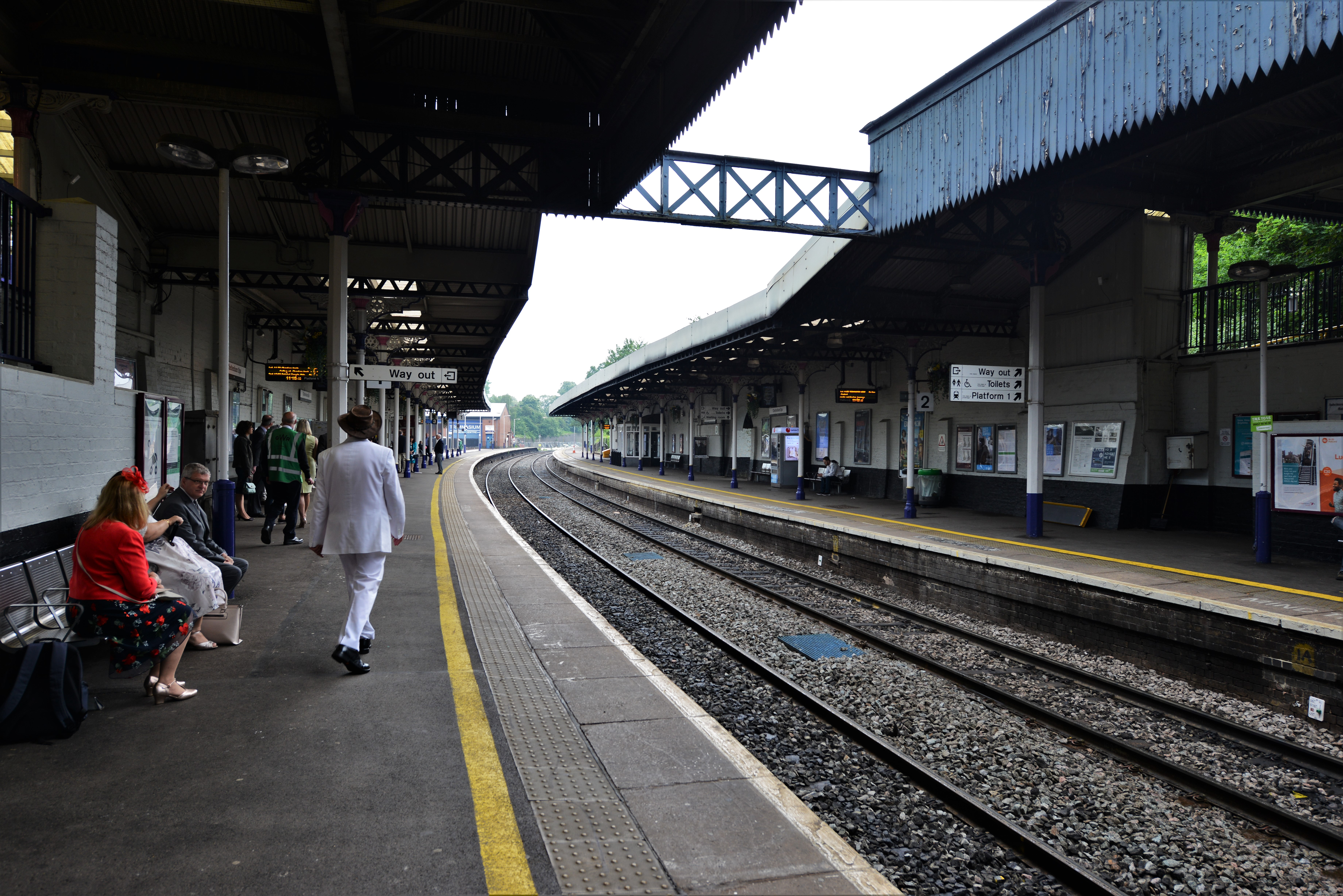
- Platforms at Cheltenham Spa station in June 2018

General information
- Location: Cheltenham, Gloucestershire; England
- Coordinates: 51.897°N 2.100°W
- Grid reference: SO931220
- Managed by: Great Western Railway
- Platforms: 2

Other information
- Station code: CNM
- Classification: DfT category C1

History
- Original company: Birmingham and Gloucester Railway
- Pre-grouping: Midland Railway
- Post-grouping: LMS

Key dates
- 24 June 1840: Opened as Cheltenham
- 1 February 1925: Renamed Cheltenham Spa (Lansdown)
- 1 January 1948: Renamed Cheltenham Spa

Passengers
- 2020/21: ▼0.462 million
- Interchange: ▼41,713
- 2021/22: ▲1.794 million
- Interchange: ▲0.169 million
- 2022/23: ▲1.965 million
- Interchange: ▲0.222 million
- 2023/24: ▲2.045 million
- Interchange: ▲0.235 million
- 2024/25: ▲2.418 million
- Interchange: ▲0.276 million
Location
Notes
- Passenger statistics from the Office of Rail and Road

Cheltenham Spa railway station serves the spa town of Cheltenham, in Gloucestershire, England. Situated on the Bristol–Birmingham main line, it is managed by Great Western Railway, although most services are operated by CrossCountry. The station is about one mile from the town centre. The official name of the station is Cheltenham; however, when the station was renamed in 1925, the London, Midland and Scottish Railway chose to add Spa to the station name. It is a regional interchange and the busiest station in Gloucestershire, as well as one of the busiest railway stations in South West England.

== History ==
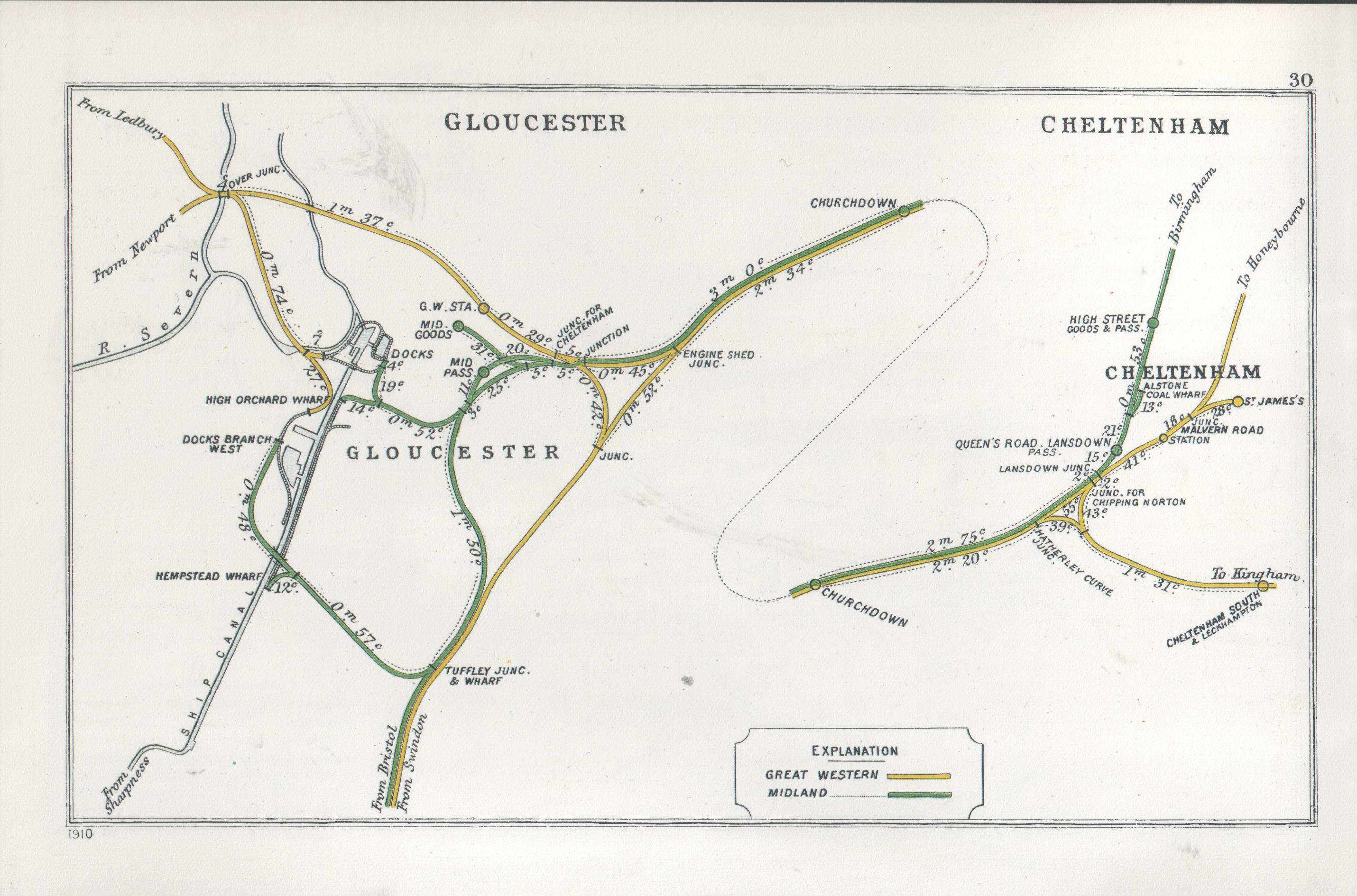
A 1910 Railway Clearing House map of railways in the vicinity of Cheltenham Spa (shown here as Queen's Road, Lansdown)

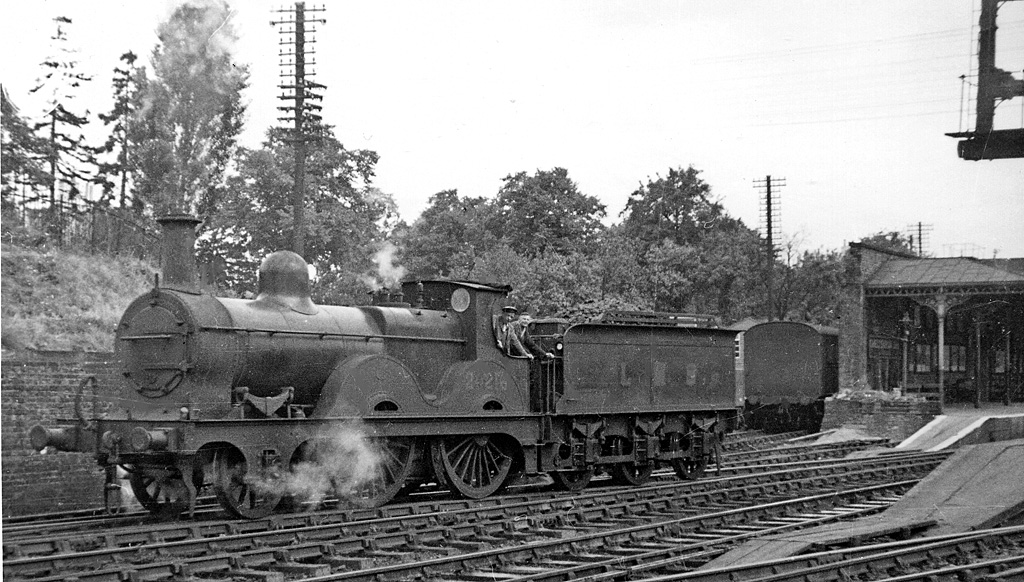
Former MR Johnson 1P 2-4-0 20216 at Cheltenham Spa station in July 1949

The first railway to Cheltenham was the broad-gauge Cheltenham and Great Western Union Railway (C&GWUR), authorised by Act of Parliament in 1836, and opened between Cheltenham and Gloucester in 1840. In the same year, the Birmingham and Gloucester Railway (B&GR) opened its line between Cheltenham and Bromsgrove, whence trains ran on mixed-gauge tracks to Gloucester. Both railways had their own stations, but the B&GR station, which was then on the edge of the town and was named Lansdown after a housing development in that area, is the only one remaining. The buildings were designed by the architect Samuel Daukes and the station was opened by the B&GR on 24 June 1840.

The C&GWUR was taken over by the Great Western Railway (GWR) in 1844, and the B&GR by the Midland Railway in 1846. Within the town, there were three other passenger railway stations: Malvern Road, St James's and Cheltenham South and Leckhampton; there was also High Street Halt and the Racecourse Platform, open only on race days.

From 1892, there was a route from Cheltenham to the docks at Southampton, via Andoversford and the Midland and South Western Junction Railway.

The station was renamed Cheltenham Spa (Lansdown) on 1 February 1925 by the London, Midland and Scottish Railway and renamed again as Cheltenham Spa by British Railways at some point after 1 January 1948.

=== Stationmasters ===
- William Turnbull 1844–1872 (discharged for failing to report his ticket collector for fraud)
- Joseph Vizard Bendall 1872–1900 (formerly station master at Harpenden)
- Henry Ward 1900–1907 (afterwards station master at Bedford)
- Horace E. Horne 1907–1909 (formerly station master at Harpenden)
- Charles Williams 1910–1913 (formerly station master at Hay)
- G.Preston Heggs 1913–1914 (afterwards station master at Sheffield)
- Henry Pitt 1914-1918 (formerly station master at Rushden)
- Arthur Ernest Chandler 1918–1928 (afterwards station master at Burton upon Trent)
- John Richard Needham from 1956 (formerly station master at Lancaster Green Ayre)

== Services ==
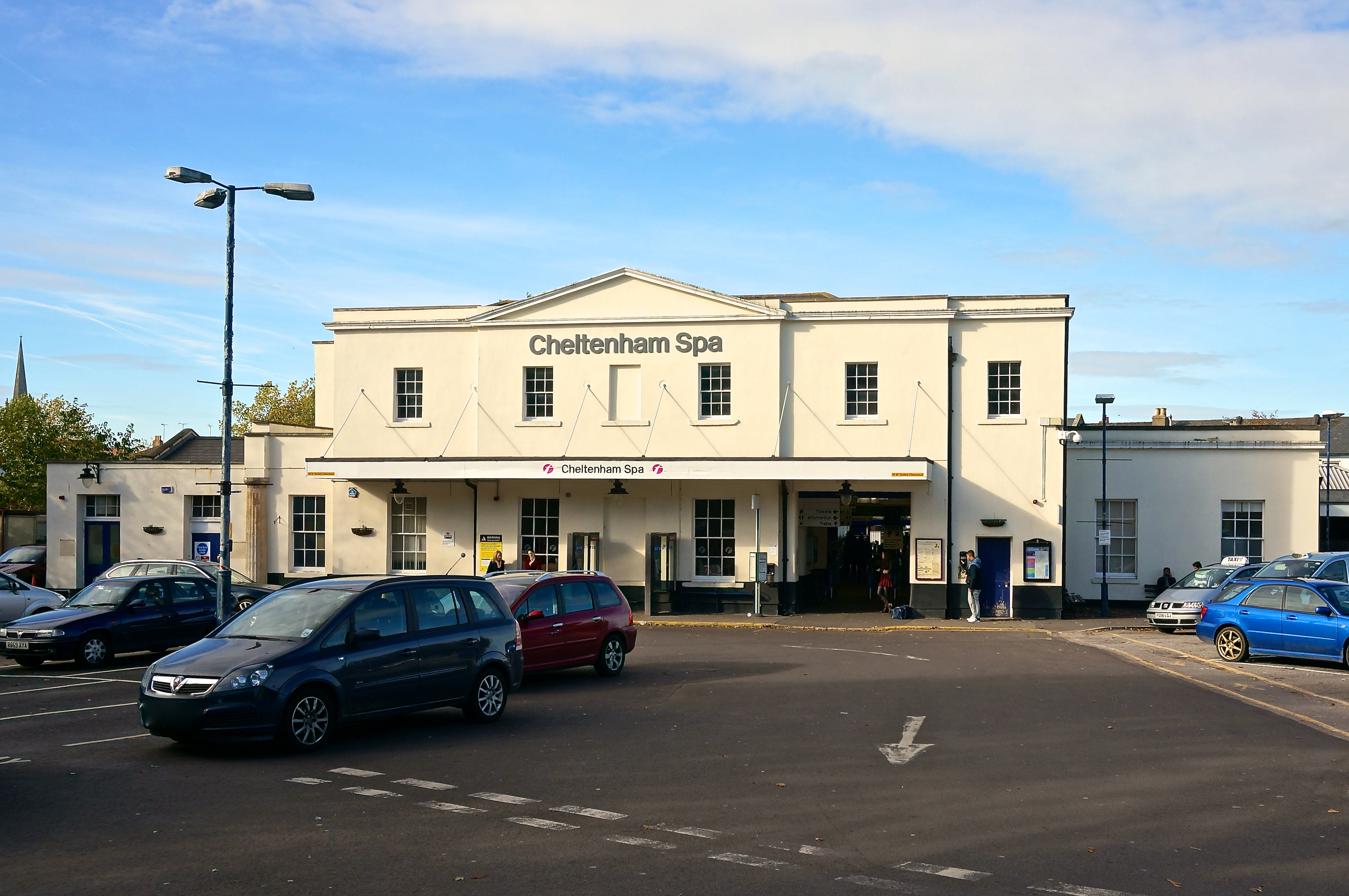
The south entrance to the station in October 2013

Cheltenham Spa station is served by 8 to 12 trains every hour during the daytime on Mondays to Saturdays; services are less frequent on Sundays. Three train operating companies services stop here:

- Great Western Railway operates approximately hourly trains to Swindon, via Gloucester; some services extend through to Didcot Parkway, Reading and London Paddington. One train to/from London Paddington per day is extended to Worcester Shrub Hill, calling additionally at Ashchurch for Tewkesbury. GWR also operates local services on the Bristol (Temple Meads/Parkway) to Gloucester and Worcester Shrub Hill route; these serve Cheltenham every two hours each way, with some southbound services continuing onwards to Westbury and Weymouth.
- CrossCountry trains call on three routes: Cardiff Central to Birmingham New Street/Nottingham; the longer-distance Penzance/Plymouth - Glasgow Central route, with extensions to Aberdeen; and Bristol Temple Meads – Manchester Piccadilly. All three of these services run hourly each way, giving a net half-hourly service to Bristol Temple Meads and three departures per hour to/from Birmingham New Street. CrossCountry also operate a morning service to Stansted Airport and summer Saturday trains to Newquay.
- Transport for Wales (TfW) operate approximately hourly trains on a route to Cardiff Central, via Gloucester and Newport. TfW also run a service between Chepstow and Gloucester. Before December 2024, the service continued through Cardiff Central to Maesteg via Bridgend.

Preceding station	National Rail	Following station
Gloucester	Transport for Wales; Cardiff - Cheltenham	Terminus
Gloucester	CrossCountry; Cardiff – Nottingham	Worcestershire Parkway or Ashchurch for Tewkesbury
Bristol Parkway	CrossCountry; South West – North East and Scotland	Birmingham New Street
Bristol Parkway	CrossCountry; Bristol – Manchester	Birmingham New Street
Gloucester	Great Western Railway; Cheltenham – London/Swindon	Terminus
Gloucester	Great Western Railway; Worcester Foregate Street - Bristol Temple Meads	Ashchurch for Tewkesbury
Disused railways
Badgeworth	Birmingham and Gloucester Railway	Swindon (Glos)
Churchdown	Midland Railway	Cheltenham High Street
Terminus	Great Western Railway; Midland and South Western Junction Railway	Leckhampton; Line and station closed
Proposed extension
Preceding station	Heritage railways	Following station
Terminus	Gloucestershire Warwickshire Railway	Cheltenham Spa Malvern Road towards Broadway

== Redevelopment proposals ==
In early 2012, Cheltenham Council released a concept statement promoting various enhancements at the station. In March 2013, the Gloucestershire Local Transport Body (LTB) asked for bids from the local area for transport projects which could be funded in the period 2015 to 2019. A proposal to significantly enhance the station with new passenger facilities, and install a new south-facing bay platform to enable trains to reverse and increase capacity, was put forward.

During the development phase of the submission, it was found that two new bay platforms were required. This configuration formed the basis of a station regeneration proposal that was submitted to the Gloucestershire Local Transport Body for consideration in early March 2013. Following short-listing to stage 2, a second funding proposal was submitted in May 2013. Proposals for the station and various other transport schemes were published for public consultation on the LTB website in the same month, and the LTB allocated £3.3 million to the scheme, which had an estimated total cost of £20 million.

In February 2014, the scheme was shelved after both Network Rail and train operator First Great Western refused to back the portion of the proposals relating to the additional platforms. They were supportive of the need to upgrade other passenger facilities, including the station building, taxi/bus interchange and car parking improvements.
