= Cheltenham High Street railway station =

Former railway station in Gloucestershire, England

Coordinates: 51.9096°N 2.0937°W

Cheltenham High Street

General information
- Location: Cheltenham, Cheltenham; England
- Grid reference: SO936234
- Platforms: 2

Other information
- Status: Disused

History
- Original company: Midland Railway
- Pre-grouping: Midland Railway

Key dates
- 1 September 1862: Opened as Cheltenham Tewkesbury Road Bridge
- 1 October 1862: Renamed Cheltenham High Street
- 1 July 1910: Closed
Location

Cheltenham High Street railway station was built by the Midland Railway to serve the north-western part of Cheltenham.

== History ==
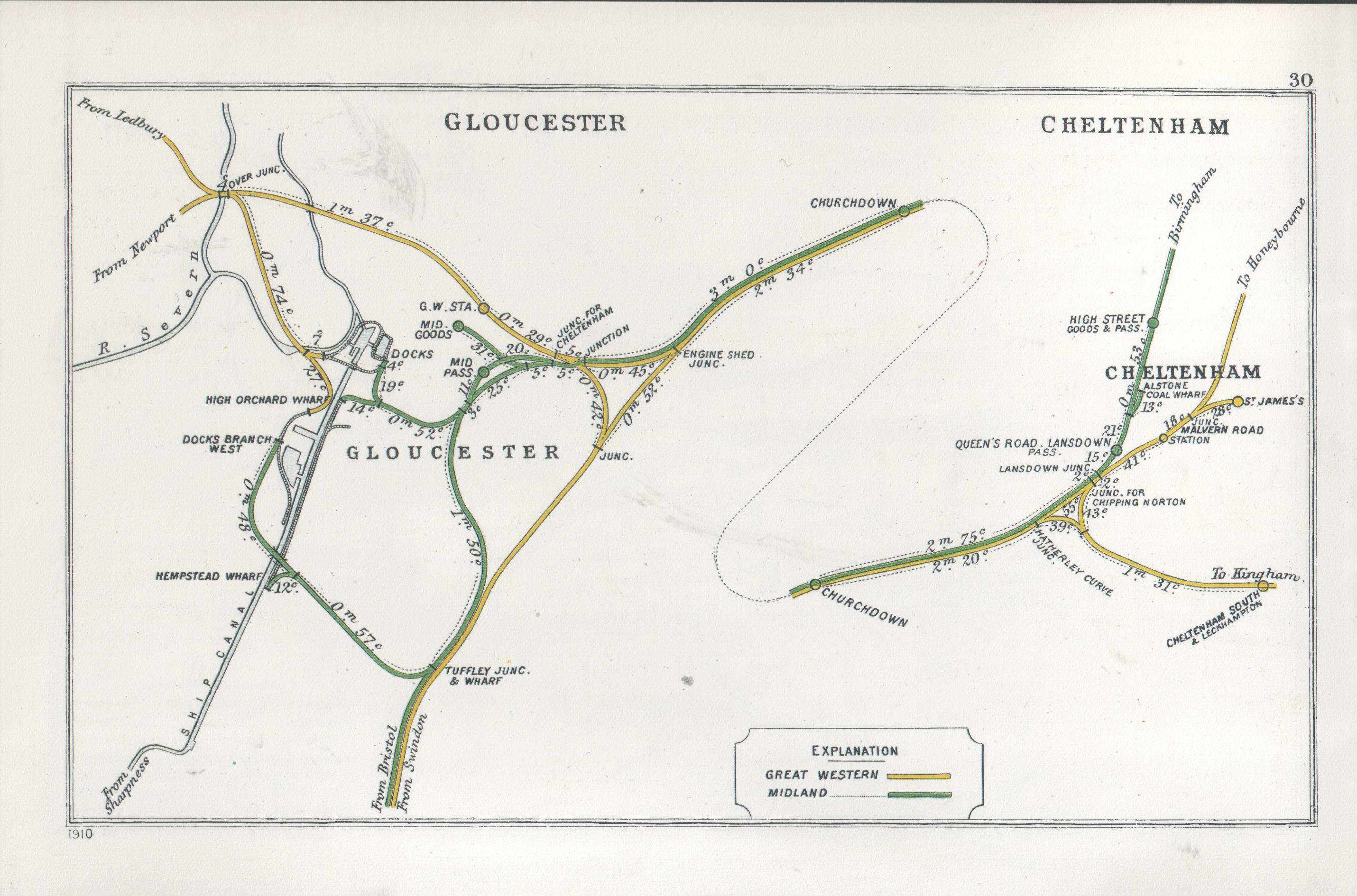
A 1910 Railway Clearing House map of railways in the vicinity of Cheltenham High Street

The station was situated on the main Birmingham to Bristol railway line, to the south of the bridge where the line passes beneath Tewkesbury Road in Cheltenham, which is a continuation of, but quite remote from that known as the High Street.

It was opened on 1 September 1862 as Cheltenham Tewkesbury Road Bridge, and a month later, on 1 October, was renamed Cheltenham High Street.

The Midland and South Western Junction Railway (MSWJ) had reached Cirencester in 1883. On 1 August 1891 the MSWJ opened an extension from Cirencester to Andoversford, which connected with the existing Banbury and Cheltenham Direct Railway; the MSWJ obtained permission to use that line to reach Cheltenham. The MSWJ passenger trains ran to Cheltenham (Lansdown), whereas the goods trains continued a little further north, to Cheltenham High Street. The MSWJ built a locomotive depot adjacent to High Street station.

The station closed to passengers on 1 July 1910. The line remains open for passenger services between Birmingham New Street and Cheltenham Spa, but these do not call at Cheltenham High Street.

=== Stationmasters ===
- William Raggett 1862 - 1875
- E. Bradley 1875 - 1877 (afterwards station master at Stretton)
- William Raggett 1875 - 1890
- Thomas Lee 1891 - 1893
- William Willson 1893 - 1902
- T.A. Aune 1902 - 1903
- T.R. West 1903 - 1905
- H.G. Cooper 1905 - 1906
- G.H. Goscombe 1906 - 1909 (afterwards station master at Haresfield)

From 1909 until closure the station was managed by the station master at Lansdown Road)

== Route ==
Preceding station	Historical railways	Following station
Cleeve; Line open, station closed	Midland Railway; Birmingham and Gloucester Railway	Cheltenham Spa; Line and station open
