= Cheltenham Spa St. James railway station =

Former railway station in England

Coordinates: 51.901904°N 2.083468°W

Cheltenham Spa St. James
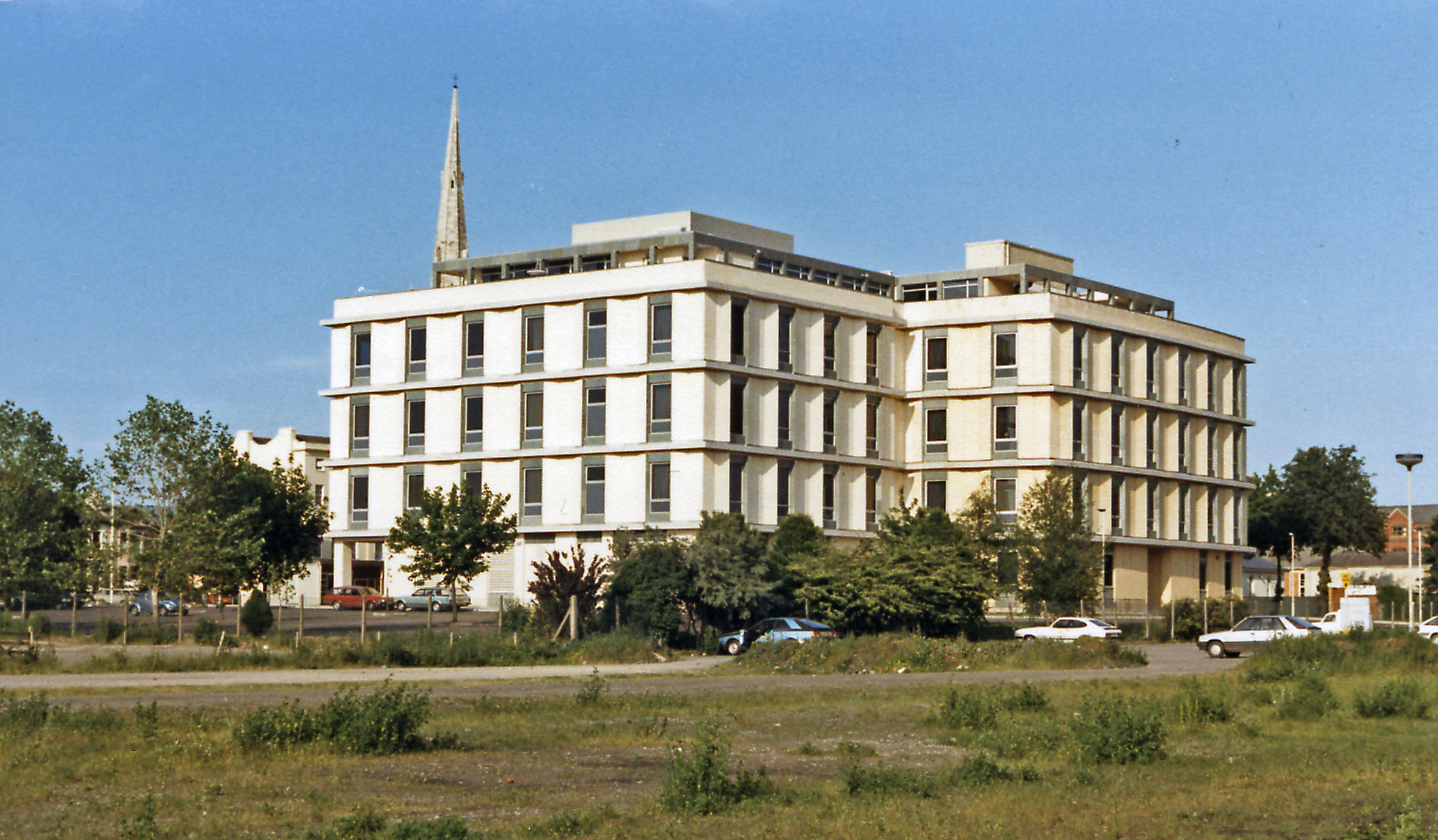
- Site of Cheltenham Spa St James' station in June 1986

General information
- Location: Cheltenham, Cheltenham; England
- Grid reference: SO944225
- Platforms: 4

Other information
- Status: Disused

History
- Original company: Cheltenham and Great Western Union Railway
- Pre-grouping: Great Western Railway
- Post-grouping: Great Western Railway

Key dates
- 23 October 1847: Opened as Cheltenham
- 9 September 1894: Closed and replaced by new station nearby
- 11 May 1908: Renamed Cheltenham St. James
- 1 February 1925: Renamed Cheltenham Spa St. James
- 3 January 1966: Closed to passenger traffic
- 31 October 1966: Closed for goods traffic
Location

Cheltenham Spa St. James railway station was a station in the town of Cheltenham.

== History ==
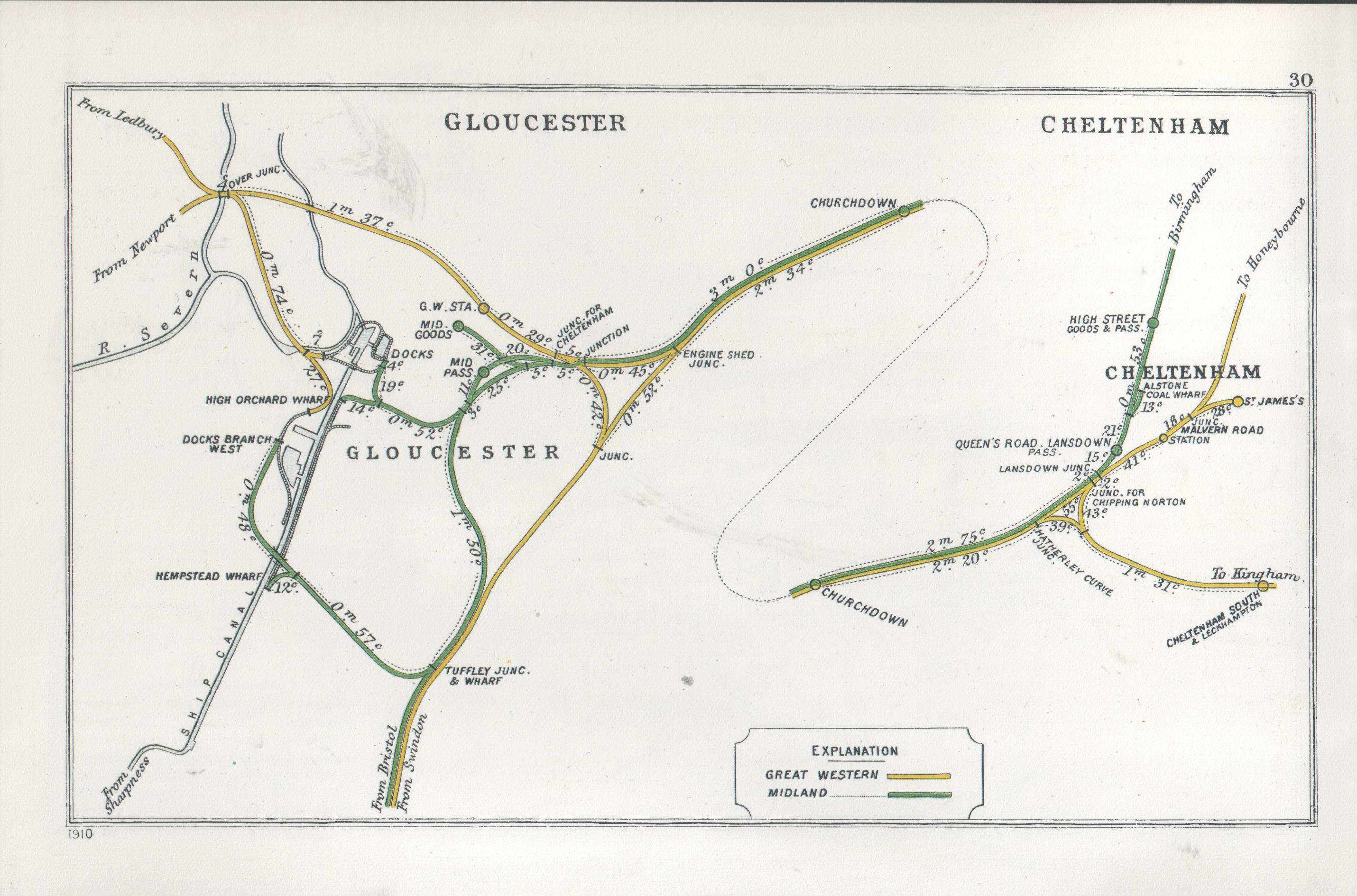
A 1910 Railway Clearing House map of railways in the vicinity of Cheltenham Spa St. James

The first station was opened by the Cheltenham and Great Western Union Railway (C&GWU) on 23 October 1847, as Cheltenham. It was the terminus of the final section of that company's line from a junction with the Great Western Railway (GWR) at Swindon, which had opened in stages: to Kemble (and Cirencester) on 31 May 1841; to Gloucester on 12 May 1845, and finally to Cheltenham on 23 October 1847. In the meantime, the C&GWU had been purchased by the GWR on 1 July 1843. Originally, the station was laid to the broad gauge, but this was converted to standard gauge in May 1872.

On 9 September 1894 it was replaced by another station also named Cheltenham, on a nearby site, slightly to the east, which had two curved semi-island platforms; two more were added later. An imposing brick-built station building was constructed with a covered carriage approach fronting St. James' Square, whilst a 204 ft (62 m) goods shed was constructed to the north of the site in a yard capable of accommodating 475 wagons. In 1904 the station was able to handle goods, passengers, parcels, furniture vans, carriages, portable engines, machines on wheels, livestock, horse boxes, prize cattle vans and private carriages; there was a crane capable of lifting 8 long tons (8,100 kg). The station was renamed twice, to Cheltenham St. James on 11 May 1908, and Cheltenham Spa St. James on 1 February 1925. It was from this station that the GWR inaugurated the Cheltenham Flyer on 9 July 1923 which ran to London via Swindon. The express covered the 77.3 miles (124.4 km) between Swindon and London in 56 minutes 47 seconds at an average speed of 81.7 miles per hour (131.5 km/h) on 6 June 1932, then the fastest-timed train in the world.

Although the GWR had absorbed the Midland and South Western Junction Railway (MSWJR) at the 1923 Grouping, the MSWJR trains from Andover, Swindon and Cirencester continued to run to the LMS (ex-Midland Railway) station at Cheltenham (Lansdown). It was not until the British Railways period that these were eventually diverted to the former GWR stations at St. James and Malvern Road, this occurring from 3 November 1958, but less than three years later, on 9 September 1961, the services along the MSWJR line ceased entirely. Closure of the route from Kingham followed on 15 October 1962. The remaining services using St. James were insufficient to make the station's retention a viable proposition and, as Birmingham to Gloucester services could not use it, Cheltenham Spa St. James station closed to passengers on 3 January 1966, with the remaining passenger services being diverted to the less-convenient Cheltenham Spa (Lansdown). General freight ceased at the same time, but coal continued until 31 October 1966; by this time the station was worked as a long siding from Malvern Road East Signal Box after the closure in June of that year of St. James's Box. The station site remained served by several bus routes for many years despite little need to do so.

== Route ==
Preceding station	Disused railways	Following station
Cheltenham Spa Malvern Road; Line and station closed	Great Western Railway; Cheltenham and Great Western Union Railway	Terminus

== Present day ==
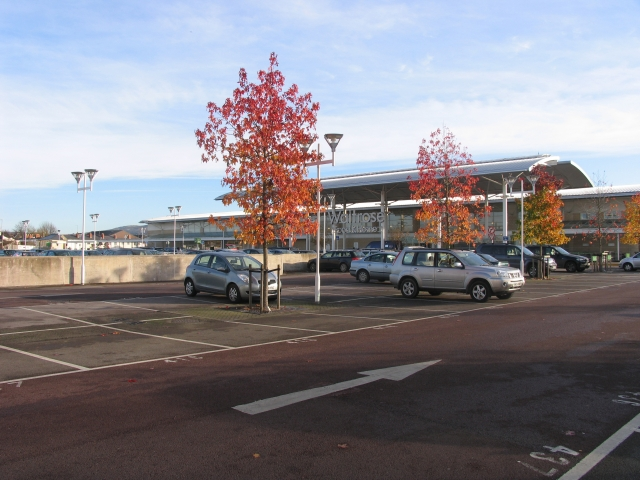
Waitrose supermarket constructed on St. James station site which photo taken in November 2008.

A Waitrose supermarket now stands on the site of St. James station. A plaque has been affixed to the entrance of the store by Cheltenham Civic Society to commemorate the now-demolished terminus. Prior to the construction of the superstore, which opened in 2002, the trackbed was used as a cyclepath linking the town with Cheltenham Leisure Centre, and so when planning permission for the redevelopment of the station site was granted, a condition was imposed that the developer construct a new pedestrian bridge to ensure continued access to the remaining trackbed. The bridge follows a section of former railway embankment which was removed to provide road access to the new store. St James House also occupies part of the site.
