= Cheltenham Spa Malvern Road railway station =

Former railway station in England

Coordinates: 51.899316°N 2.093375°W

Cheltenham Spa (Malvern Road)
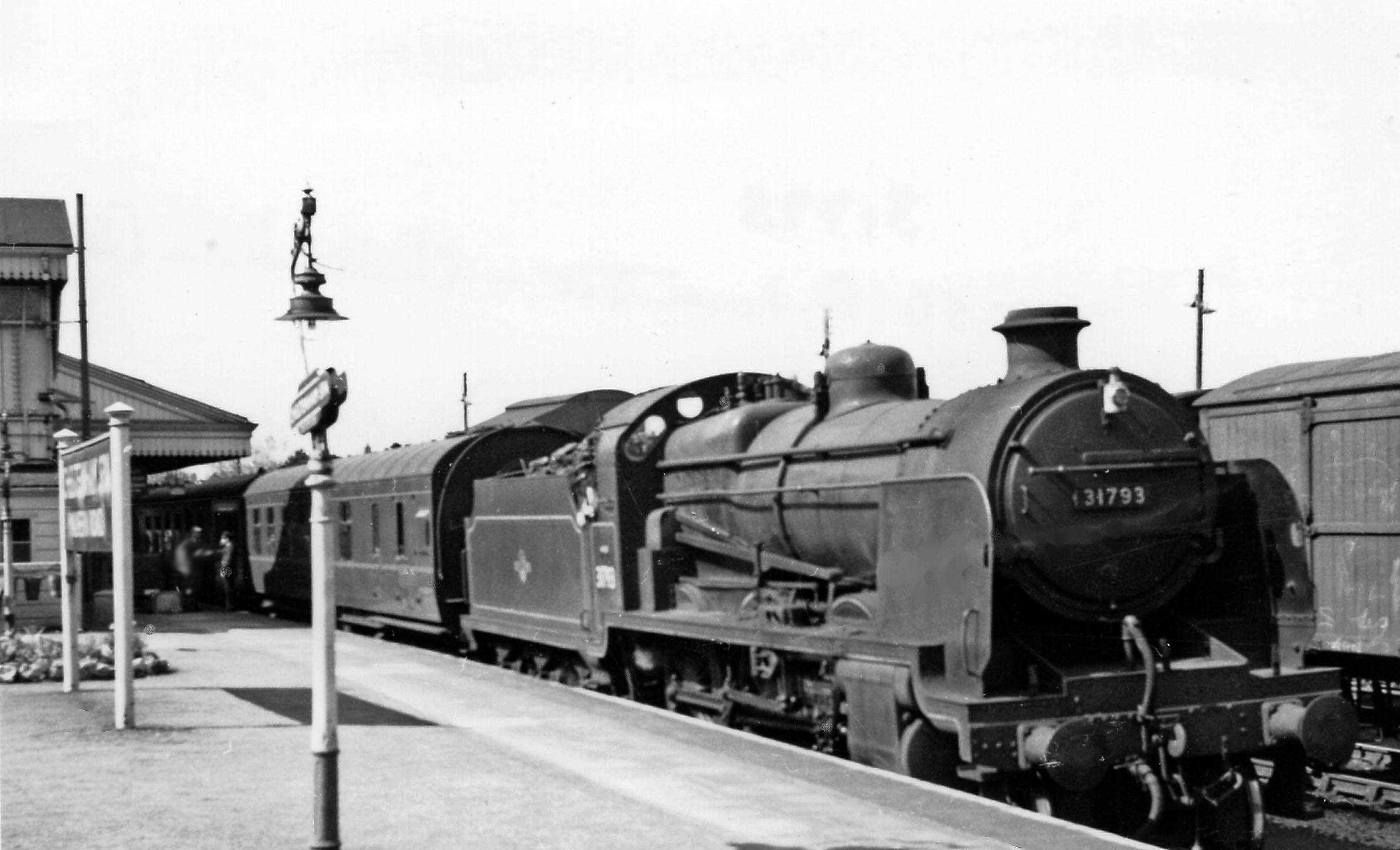
- The station in April 1959

General information
- Location: Cheltenham, Cheltenham; England
- Grid reference: SO936223
- Platforms: 3

Other information
- Status: Disused

History
- Original company: Great Western Railway
- Post-grouping: Great Western Railway; Western Region of British Railways

Key dates
- 30 March 1908: Opened as Cheltenham Malvern Road
- 1 January 1917: Closed
- 7 July 1919: Re-opened
- 1 February 1925: Renamed Cheltenham Spa Malvern Road
- 3 January 1966: Closed
Location

Cheltenham Spa Malvern Road railway station was a station in the town of Cheltenham.

== History ==
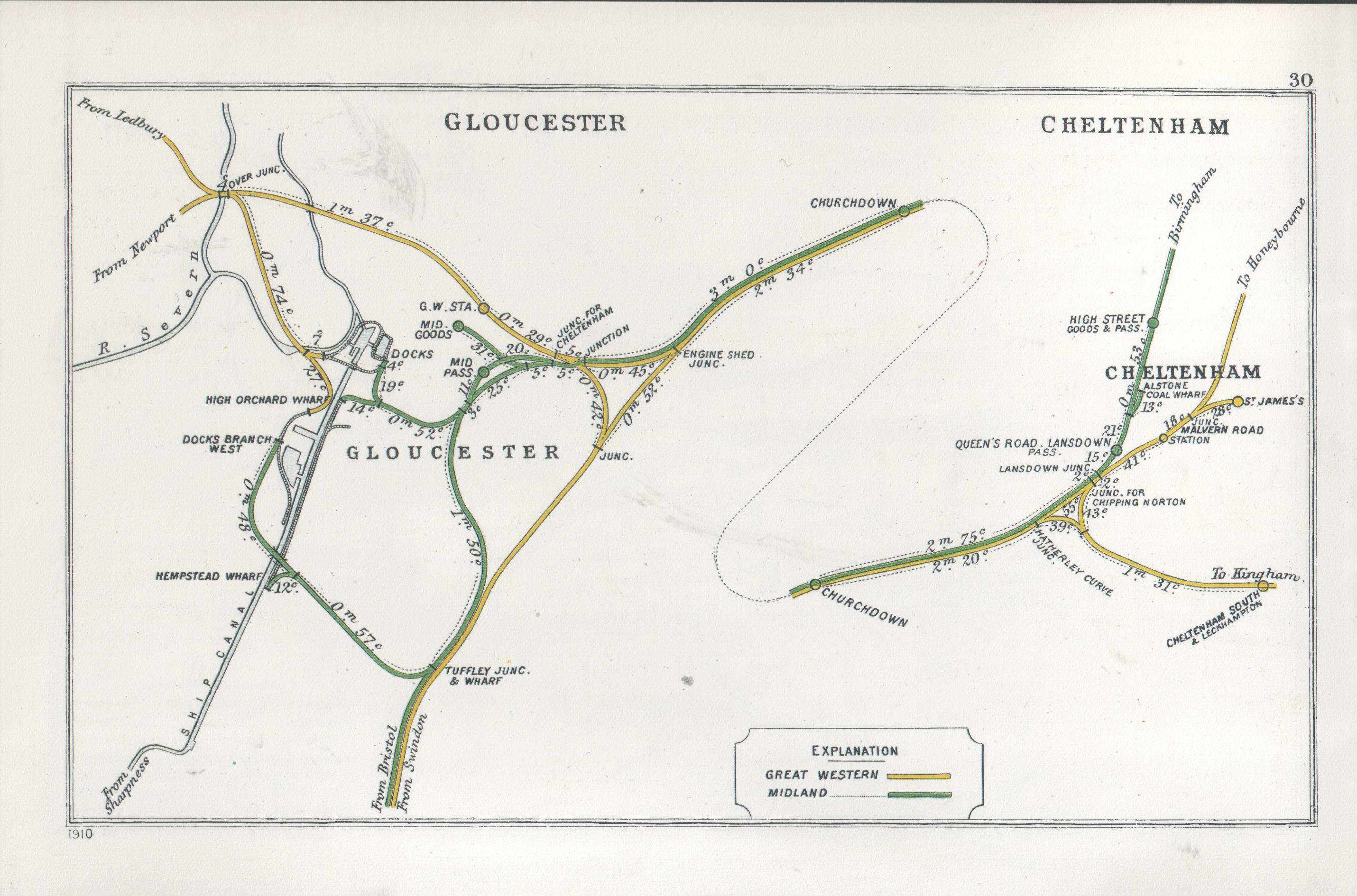
A 1910 Railway Clearing House map of railways in the vicinity of Cheltenham Spa Malvern Road

The station was opened by the Great Western Railway on 30 March 1908, as Cheltenham Malvern Road. It was provided so that trains along the line to Stratford-upon-Avon would not have to start and terminate at Cheltenham Spa St. James, which involved a reversal. The station took its name from the road to the north from which a long driveway provided the main means of public access. Unlike the other stations on the line, Malvern Road had a single island platform, 860 feet (260 m) long on the Up side and 702 feet (214 m) on the Down side, which was reached by means of a covered footbridge leading from the booking office. The platform served both main running lines, together with a bay at the north end into which local branch railmotor services to and from Honeybourne reversed before returning to the St. James terminus, which was much closer to Cheltenham town centre. Malvern Road did not have a resident stationmaster, and it was placed under the responsibility of the St. James stationmaster who also took charge of Cheltenham High Street Halt and Cheltenham Racecourse stations. Stone from the Cleeve Hill quarries was used in the station buildings, while the platform copings were sourced from Pontypridd.

Regular through services from Birmingham Snow Hill to the West of England via Stratford and Malvern Road commenced on 1 July 1908 upon the opening of the North Warwickshire Line. These services covered the distance in just over 2½ hours, but did not run to St. James to which a connecting service was provided by Honeybourne locals or the services to Kingham and Gloucester. By April 1910, The Cornishman express was calling at Malvern Road as part of its Wolverhampton to Penzance service. The suspension of long-distance services for a period towards the end of the First World War led to the temporary closure of Malvern Road as an economy measure between 1 January 1917 and 7 July 1919. Not long after reopening, the station was renamed Cheltenham Spa Malvern Road on 1 February 1925.

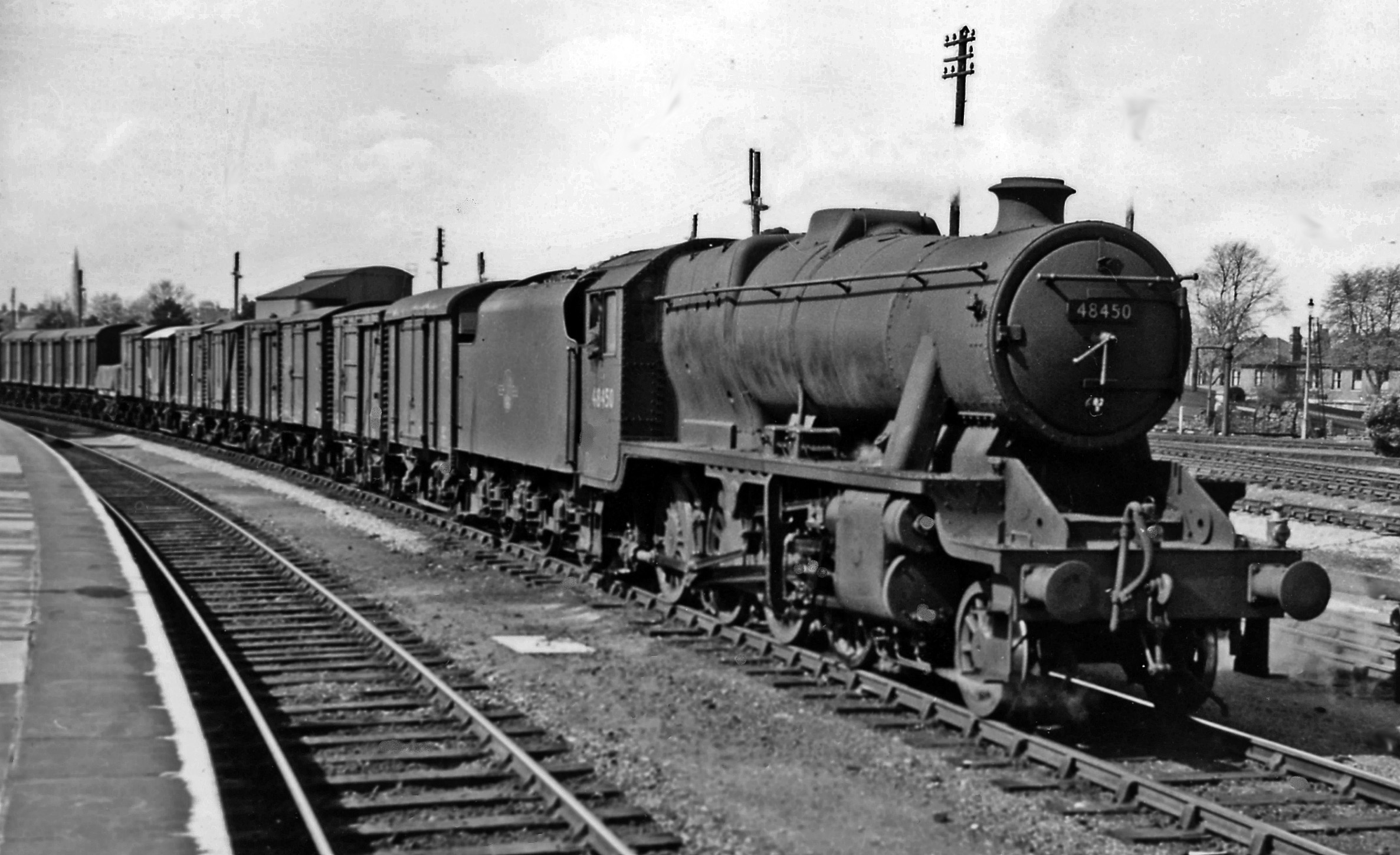
Down freight on the ex-GWR main line from Birmingham in April 1959

To the west of Malvern Road lay several loop sidings serving a two-road engine shed and coaling stage. Access to these facilities was controlled by two signal boxes - Malvern Road East to the north, and Malvern Road West to the south. The East box was opened on 15 July 1906 and had 49 levers; it had replaced the Bayshill signal box which had controlled access to a locomotive shed demolished when the line was extended to Honeybourne. The West box was open by June 1908 and had 37 levers; it replaced a temporary box dating from August 1906. The station saw very little goods traffic as most were handled at St. James; a 15-ton weighbridge was nevertheless provided in the yard.

High-speed services between Bristol Temple Meads and Birmingham on the Birmingham to Gloucester line led to a decline in traffic on the Honeybourne line which closed to local passenger services from 7 March 1960. Malvern Road closed on 3 January 1966 to goods and passengers. The Cheltenham to Honeybourne stretch remained open for passenger trains until 1968 and occasional freight traffic until 25 August 1976 when the derailment of a coal train at Winchcombe caused damage to the Down line which was considered uneconomic to repair. Malvern Road West Signal Box had closed on 5 June 1966, with the East Signal Box lasting until 3 November 1970.

== Present day ==
The station was demolished after closure but part of the trackbed is now a footpath. . A long-term goal of the Gloucestershire Warwickshire Railway is to extend their services towards the present station at Cheltenham Spa (Lansdown) (with the intention of offering interchange with rail services on the Cross Country Route), which would involve passing the site of Malvern Road.

== Route ==
Disused railways
Cheltenham Spa St. James; Line and station closed	Great Western Railway; Banbury and Cheltenham Direct Railway	Cheltenham Leckhampton; Line and station closed
Cheltenham Spa St. James; Line and station closed	Great Western Railway; Cheltenham and Great Western Union Railway	Churchdown; Line partly open, station closed
Cheltenham High Street Halt; Line and station closed	Great Western Railway; Honeybourne Line	Churchdown; Line partly open, station closed
Preceding station	Heritage railways	Following station
Proposed extension
Cheltenham Spa Terminus	Gloucestershire Warwickshire Railway	Cheltenham Race Course towards Broadway
