= Cheltenham High Street Halt railway station =

Railway station in Cheltenham, England

Coordinates: 51.904933°N 2.084433°W

Cheltenham High Street Halt

General information
- Location: Cheltenham, Cheltenham; England
- Grid reference: SO942229
- Platforms: 2

Other information
- Status: Disused

History
- Original company: Great Western Railway

Key dates
- 1 October 1908: Opened
- 30 April 1917: Closed
Location

Cheltenham High Street Halt was a railway station on the Great Western Railway's Honeybourne Line between Cheltenham and Birmingham via Stratford-upon-Avon. It opened on 1 October 1908 and closed on 30 April 1917 due to the First World War, never to be reopened.

Situated on top of an embankment, the halt was a late addition to a site upon which something much larger and grander had originally been planned but was never built which was Townsend Street Station, whose ornate facade would have occupied almost all of the East side of Townsend Street, a thoroughfare to the west of the line.

== Facilities ==
The Halt had a pagoda-style shelter on each platform, and was unstaffed. Nothing exists today, save the steel bridge which still spans the road, now (2015) carrying a footpath.

Preceding station	Disused railways	Following station
Cheltenham Spa Malvern Road; Line and station closed	Great Western Railway; Honeybourne Line	Cheltenham Race Course; Line closed, station open
