= Ewenny Road drill hall, Maesteg =

Military building in Maesteg, Wales

Ewenny Road drill hall
- Maesteg
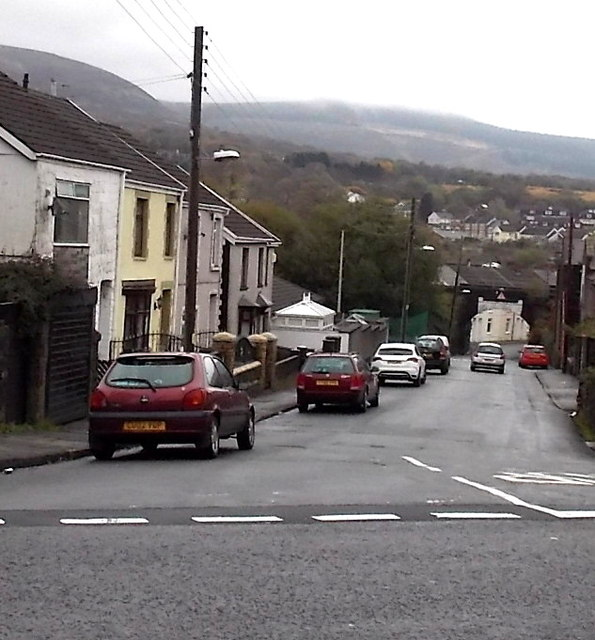
- Ewenny Road, Maesteg

Site information
- Type: Drill hall

Location
- Location within Bridgend County Borough
- Coordinates: 51.60573°N 3.64659°W

Site history
- Built: Early 20th century
- Built for: War Office
- In use: Early 20th century - Present

The Ewenny Road drill hall is a former military installation in Maesteg, Bridgend, Wales.

== History ==
The building was designed as the headquarters of the Glamorgan Yeomanry and was completed in the early 20th century. The regiment was mobilised at the drill hall in August 1914 before being deployed to Egypt. After the war the drill hall was decommissioned and converted for industrial use.
