= Glamorgan Yeomanry =

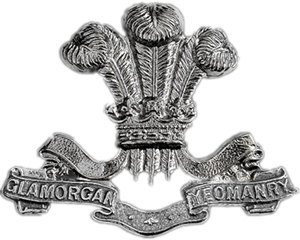
- Glamorgan Yeomanry cap badge
- Active: 1797–1831; 1861–1873 (Light Horse Volunteers); 1901–present
- Country: Kingdom of Great Britain (1794–1800); United Kingdom (1801–Present)
- Branch: Territorial Army
- Type: Yeomanry
- Size: Regiment
- Engagements: Merthyr Rising; Second Boer War; World War I; Sinai and Palestine campaign; [[Hundred Days offensive[Hundred Days campaign]]; World War II; Normandy campaign; North West Europe campaign

Commanders
- Notable commanders: Col Windham Wyndham-Quin

The Glamorgan Yeomanry was a Welsh auxiliary cavalry regiment of the British Army originally raised in the late 18th century as a result of concern over the threat of invasion by the French. It was used for aiding the civil powers in South Wales in the early part of the 19th Century until it was disbanded in 1831. Re-raised in the Second Boer War it saw service in both World War I and (as artillery) World War II. The lineage is maintained by C (Glamorgan Yeomanry) Troop, 211 (South Wales) Battery, 104th Regiment Royal Artillery.

== French Revolutionary and Napoleonic Wars ==
After Britain was drawn into the French Revolutionary Wars, Prime Minister William Pitt the Younger proposed on 14 March 1794 that the counties should form a force of Volunteers that could be called on by the King to defend the nation against invasion or by the Lord Lieutenant to subdue any civil disorder within the county. The government was particularly interested in units of Gentlemen and Yeoman Cavalry (Yeomanry) both for their mobility and their political reliability as landowners and their tenant farmers. By the end of the year 27 counties had raised Yeomanry, but Glamorgan was backward, only one infantry unit being formed by 1796. However, the attempted French landing in South Wales in February 1797 (the Battle of Fishguard) gave renewed impetus to the recruitment of yeomanry. The following units were raised in Glamorgan:

- Neath Troop of Gentlemen and Yeomanry, raised by Captain John Nathaniel Miers, accepted May 1797 (1 Troop of about 40 men)
- Swansea Troop of Gentlemen and Yeomanry, first proposed 1792; raised 1 May 1797 by Capt John Llewelyn of Penllergaer but not accepted until May 1798 when commanded by Capt Thomas Morgan (1 Troop of 40–50 men)
- Cardiff Troop of Gentlemen and Yeomanry, raised 26 June 1798 by Capt William Vaughan (1 Troop of 47 men)
- Fairwood Troop of Gentlemen and Yeomanry, raised in the Gower Peninsula 27 June 1798 by Capt Sir Gabriel Powell (1 Troop of 30–50 men)

In April 1800 the Swansea Troop was called out in aid of the civil power when corn riots broke out in Neath and Swansea, and its arrival on the scene was sufficient to persuade the rioters to disperse. There was more trouble at Merthyr Tydfil, and here the Cardiff Troop used the flats of their swords and assisted other military units in arresting 50 rioters with no loss of life.

On 25 July 1800 the Swansea Troop was combined with three companies of infantry volunteers in the area to form the Swansea Legion, with Capt Morgan being promoted to lieutenant-colonel to command it, handing over the yeomanry troop to Capt Edward Hughes.

The Treaty of Amiens signed on 25 March 1802 appeared to have ended the war, and the yeomanry and volunteers were stood down, though shortly afterwards the government offered new terms to yeomanry units that were prepared to continue. All the volunteer infantry units in Glamorgan disbanded. Amongst the yeomanry, the Neath Troop disbanded in April 1802 but the Swansea Legion Cavalry continued in service, as did the Cardiff and Fairwood Troops.

When the Peace of Amiens broke down and the war was resumed in 1803, new volunteer infantry were formed and the three yeomanry units continued as the Cardiff Cavalry (Capt John Wood), Fairwood Cavalry (Sir Gabriel Powell) and the Swansea Cavalry (two troops under Capt Edward Hughes) in the reformed Swansea Legion. Lieutenant-Col Morgan died in March 1804 and the Legion broke up into its constituent units.

Over the following years the yeomanry carried out paid training or 'permanent duty' most years. In 1804 the Swansea Legion (which now also included artillery) combined with the West Glamorgan Infantry Volunteers and the Glamorgan Riflemen in a realistic anti-invasion exercise at Swansea, exchanging blank fire with a landing force provided by Royal Navy warships in the bay. In 1808 the volunteer infantry were replaced by the Glamorgan Local Militia, leaving the yeomanry troops as the only entirely volunteer force in the county. In the round of annual inspections and training the two Swansea troops and the neighbouring Fairwood cavalry tended to act together. In 1813 the government encouraged smaller yeomanry corps to amalgamate into larger regiments and the Swansea & Fairwood Troops under Major Edward Hughes combined with the Cardiff Troop to form the Glamorgan Yeomanry Cavalry, though the three captains-commandant exercised almost total autonomy.

== 19th Century ==
The Volunteers and Local Militia were stood down after the Battle of Waterloo, but the Yeomanry continued. Although they generally allowed to decline, some units were still occasionally used in support of the civil power.

In mid-October 1816 a series of strikes at the ironworks of the eastern valleys of South Wales led to violence when the master of the Dowlais Ironworks together with special constables and loyal workers was besieged in Dowlais House. After a magistrate was injured the besieged opened fire on the attacking mob, killing one and wounding others. They were relieved by the arrival at Merthyr Tydfil of the permanent staff of the Royal Glamorgan Light Infantry Militia (RGLI), and the mob dispersed. The Cardiff Troop and a detachment of the Swansea & Fairwood Cavalry arrived shortly after, together with a detachment of 120 men of the 55th Foot. However, attempts to re-light the ironworks furnaces led about 8000 strikers to gather outside the Castle Inn at Merthyr to confront the military. When they refused to disperse after the Riot Act had been read, the magistrates ordered the Yeomanry to disperse them. This they accomplished without bloodshed using only the flat of their swords, and around 30 arrests were made. Two days later the Swansea Cavalry moved to the north Monmouthshire valleys where with the Monmouthshire Yeomanry they were able to prevent the workers assembling. Later the Swansea detachment moved to Newport, where their presence kept the peace.

For this service the Glamorgan Yeomanry received praise from the Home Secretary, Viscount Sidmouth, but he warned that the county's force was too small. The Lord Lieutenant of Glamorgan, the Marquess of Bute, sought proposals for the formation of two new troops, one in central Glamorganshire and one at Llantrisant. The Central Glamorgan Troop was soon recruited, under the command of John Nicholl of Merthyr Mawr, and Nicholl went in to raise a second, both troops assembling for their first training on Ogmore Down on 19 October 1820. Captain Richard Fowler Rickards of Llantrisant House raised the troop there before the end of the year. By September 1824 the Glamorgan Yeomanry was organised as follows:

- Swansea & Fairwood Corps (3 Trps) – Maj Hughes
- Central Glamorgan & Llantrisant Corps (3 Trps, headquarters at Bridgend) – Maj Rickards
- Cardiff Troop – Capt Whitlock Nicholl

In December 1824 the western troops of the Central Glamorgan & Llantrisant Corps provided detachments to prevent looting of a shipwreck on Sker Beach. In May 1825 a detachment of the same corps was called out in aid of the civil power in Bridgend, but their presence was enough to deter trouble. From October 1824 a dispute arose between Capt Nicholls of the 1st Central Trp and Maj Rickards over the latter's drawing pay for his son as a cornet in the corps despite him being in India and never present for training. This dispute escalated and in 1827 Rickards offered to resign but was supported by the Marquess of Bute; Nicholls resigned instead and was later succeeded by . In February 1828 the Llantrisant Trp separated from the Central Glamorgan Trps and instead amalgamated with the and Cardiff Trp as the Eastern Corps, Glamorgan Yeomanry, under the command of Maj Rickards, who attempted unsuccessfully to raise a third troop. The three 'divisions' of the regiment, Eastern, Western and Central, trained separately.

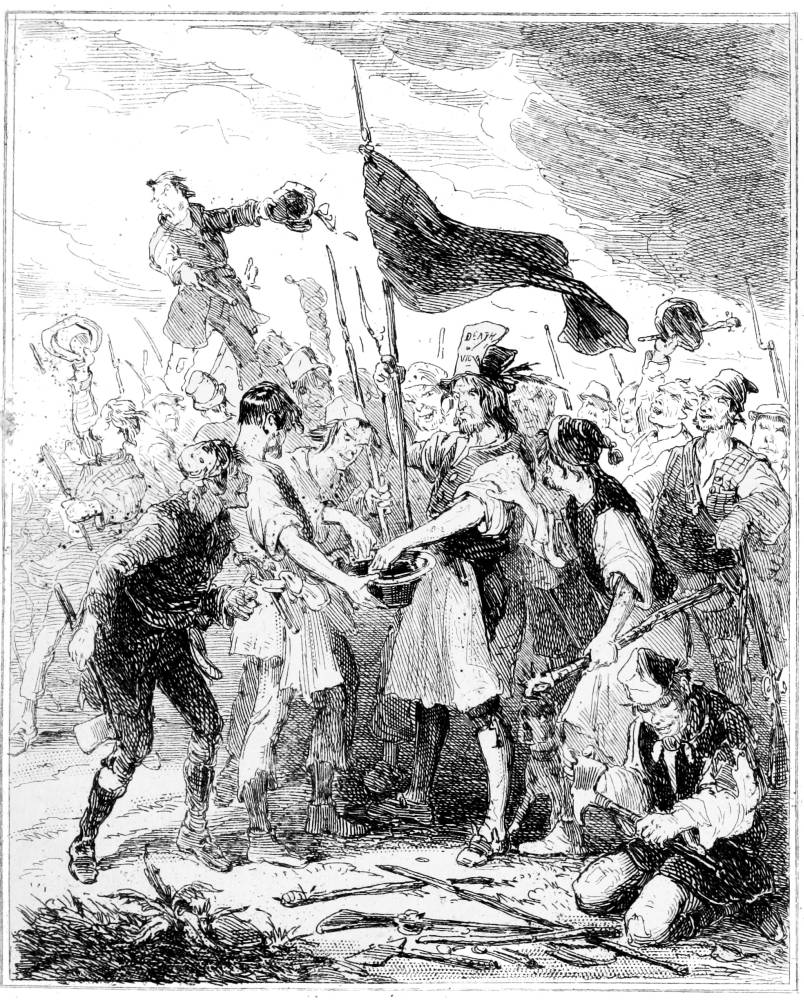
Later depiction of the Merthyr Rising, with armed rioters raising the red flag.

A serious outbreak of rioting (the Merthyr Rising) arose in June 1831. Starting in Aberdare on 1 June it spread to Merthyr next day, bringing all iron production to a standstill. The magistrates appealed for military assistance and on the morning of 3 June a detachment of the 93rd Highlanders arrived from Brecon at the Cyfarthfa Ironworks. A confrontation had followed outside the Castle Inn, where rioters tried to disarm the Highlanders, who opened fire, killing and wounding many in the crowd, while suffering several wounded themselves. Reinforced by the permanent staff and a few recruits of the RGLI rushed up in coaches from their training, the Highlanders withdrew to Pen y Darren House and formed a perimeter. The three divisions of the Glamorgan Yeomanry had been called out and ordered to proceed to Merthyr with all speed. On 4 June Capt Moggeridge of the Eastern Division with 40 troopers attempted to escort in the Hghlanders' ammunition waggons from Brecon but was confronted by rioters in the steep valley at Cefn-coed-y-cymmer. Having just reached Pen y Darren with the Central Division, Lt-Col Thomas Morgan ordered Maj Rickards with 100 troopers to rescue the convoy. Unable to deploy his men in the valley and under a barrage of stones and a few musket shots, Rickards was forced to withdraw, but Moggeridge had got the waggons through to Merthyr by a different route at the expense of one man wounded and one disarmed. A more serious setback occurred on the road from Hirwaun to Merthyr, where Maj Penrice with a half-troop of 36 men acting as the advance guard of the Western Division was ambushed by armed rioters. His men were disarmed and allowed to withdraw, warning the main bod of the Westen Division, which reached Merthyr by a longer route on 6 June. The mob had approached Pen y Darren but found it too well defended. Sunday 5 June passed quietly, but the rioters approached again on 6 June. Lieutenant-Col Morgan moved out and deployed to meet them at Dowlais Pond. The rioters having ignored the reading of the Riot Act and appeals to disperse, Lt-Col Richard Morgan of the RGLI, giving the words of command slowly and clearly, ordered the Highlanders and Militia to load, and the Yeomanry to draw sabres. At this the rioters gave way and were dispersed by the Yeomanry without further casualties. Regular cavalry arrived on 7 June as the ringleaders were hunted, and the Glamorgan Yeomanry returned home, the Swansea & Fairwood Troops being urgently required to deal with trouble among coal miners in the Clydach and Cwm Tawe valleys. The yeomanry were dismissed to their homes on 10 June.

The growing civil unrest of 1830–31 persuaded the government to support a revival of the militia. The Marquess of Bute proposed to disband the existing Glamorgan Yeomanry and re-raise it as three troops (Western, Central and Eastern). This clumsy arrangement alienated the officers, and having disbanded their troops on or about 5 September as ordered, Bute could find none who were prepared to raise the replacement troops. His proposal was dropped in 1832, and Glamorgan had no further yeomanry presence for a generation.

== Light Horse Volunteers ==
The enthusiasm for the rifle volunteer movement following another invasion scare in 1859 saw the creation of many units composed of part-time soldiers eager to supplement the regular British Army in time of need. Among these was the 1st Glamorgan Light Horse Volunteers, formed at Cardiff on 15 February 1861. (Note: Strictly speaking, the Light Horse Volunteers were not Yeomanry, but both were raised under the Yeomanry and Volunteers Consolidation Act 1804 until the Volunteer Act 1863 came into force.) This unit was attached to the 1st Administrative Brigade of Glamorganshire Artillery Volunteers in 1863. It was disbanded in 1873 and there were no more yeomanry or volunteer cavalry in the county for the rest of 19th century.

== Imperial Yeomanry ==
=== Second Boer War ===
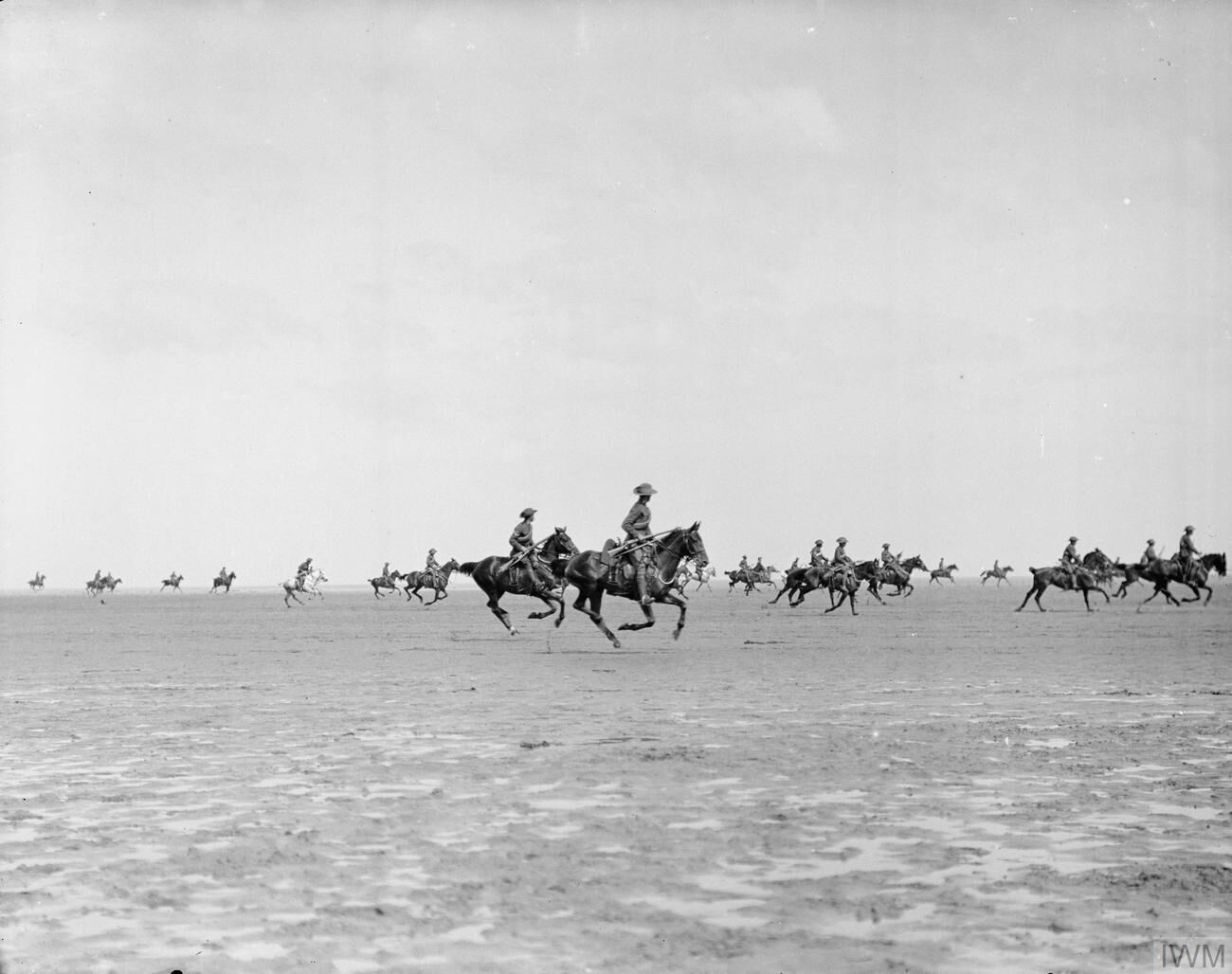
Imperial Yeomanry galloping over a plain during the Second Boer War.

Following a string of defeats during Black Week in early December 1899, the British government realised that it would need more troops than just the regular army to fight the Second Boer War, particularly mounted troops. On 13 December, the War Office decided to allow volunteer forces to serve in the field and a royal warrant was issued on 24 December that officially created the Imperial Yeomanry (IY). This was organised as county service companies of approximately 115 men enlisted for one year. Volunteers (mainly middle and upper class) quickly filled the new force, which was equipped to operate as mounted infantry. Although there were strict requirements, many volunteers were accepted with substandard horsemanship or marksmanship skills, and there was little time for training before the first contingent embarked for South Africa.

Among the first IY units raised was 4th (Glamorgan) Company, one of the few companies in the first contingent that was not sponsored by an existing yeomanry regiment. It was raised by Windham Wyndham-Quin, member of parliament for South Glamorganshire, a retired major in the 16th Lancers who had seen active service in the First Boer War. His efforts were supported by the Western Mail newspaper. The men were selected from over 300 applicants by 2 February and kitted out in khaki by 10 February. Windham-Quin was re-commissioned as a captain in the IY on 14 February 1900 The men underwent brief training at Raglan Barracks, Newport, then left by rail on 28 February for Liverpool, where they embarked at Canada Dock aboard SS Cymric for Cape Town.

4th (Glamorgan) Company landed at Cape Town on 23 March and moved to the IY camp and training depot at Maitland. Here it joined 1st Battalion, IY, alongside the 1st and 2nd (Wiltshire) and 3rd (Gloucestershire) Companies. After a short period of acclimatisation and further training at Maitland, the battalion moved up to Bloemfontein to join 16th Brigade, 8th Division, in Sir Leslie Rundle's column. When Lord Roberts renewed his advance from Bloemfontein in early May 1900, Rundle's column had the job of preventing any Boers from re-entering the south-eastern Orange Free State (OFS). In July Roberts's columns drove the OFS commandos into the Brandwater Basin where on 20 July 4th (Glamorgan) Co was present when Gen Marthinus Prinsloo and a large force of Boers were forced to surrender at Fouriesburg. The company carried out seemingly endless patrols and skirmishes while riding the flanks of the column. At first, the inexperienced yeomen were roughly handled by the Boers, but by October they were doing good work in the advanced guard of Rundle's column as it advanced on Harrismith.

After the first IY contingent returned home at the end of their year's service, Major Wyndham-Quin was awarded a DSO, and later (after he had been promoted to lieutenant-colonel in the IY), he was awarded the honorary rank of colonel.

=== Glamorganshire Imperial Yeomanry ===
The Imperial Yeomanry concept was considered a success and before the war ended the existing yeomanry regiments at home were converted into Imperial Yeomanry, and new regiments raised from returned veterans of the South African War. One of these was the Glamorganshire Imperial Yeomanry, approval for which was given on 14 June 1901. It was raised in August 1901 and included many of the returned members of 4th Company, which it was considered to perpetuate. Under the command of Lt-Col Wyndham-Quin, with Maj Charles Dillwyn-Venables-Llewelyn as second-in-command, it comprised:

- Regimental headquarters (RHQ) at 31 Ewenny Road in Maesteg, Bridgend
- A Squadron at Swansea
- B Squadron at Bridgend
- C Squadron at Cardiff
- D Squadron at Pontypridd, raised 1902
- Machine gun section

In 1904 the new regiment carried out its annual training alongside the Pembroke Imperial Yeomanry, and in 1906 all four Welsh IY regiments (the others being the Denbighshire and the Montgomeryshire) trained together as a brigade at Llangammarch in mid-Wales. The regiment's annual camp in 1907 was held at Penally, Pembrokeshire.

== Territorial Force ==
The Imperial Yeomanry were subsumed into the new Territorial Force (TF) under the Haldane Reforms of 1908. The Glamorgan Yeomanry was designated as a dragoon regiment and formed part of the TF's South Wales Mounted Brigade (SWMB) with the following organisation:

- A Squadron at 7 Rutland Street, Swansea, with detachments at Quay Road, Neath, Port Talbot and Reynoldston
- B Squadron at 31 Ewenny Road, Bridgend, with detachments at Maesteg, Cowbridge and Porthcawl
- C Squadron at Newport Road, Cardiff
- D Squadron at Pontypridd, with detachments at Nelson, Llwynypia, Caerphilly, Mountain Ash, Aberdare and Brecon Road, Merthyr

== World War I ==
=== Mobilisation ===
The Glamorgan Yeomanry was mobilised at Bridgend on the outbreak of war on 4 August 1914 under the command of Lt-Col J.I.D. Nicholl, who had only taken command on 20 June 1914. It joined the SWMB at Hereford on 12 August. Under the Territorial and Reserve Forces Act 1907, the TF was intended to be a home defence force for service during wartime and members could not be compelled to serve outside the country. However, on 10 August, TF units were invited to volunteer for overseas service. In the SWMB the Glamorgan and Montgomeryshire Yeomanry signed up en masse at Hereford, though the Pembroke Yeomanry were less enthusiastic (many were later persuaded to change their minds and sign up). On 15 August the War Office issued instructions to separate those men who had signed up for Home Service only, and form these into reserve units. On 31 August, the formation of a reserve or 2nd Line unit was authorised for each 1st Line unit where 60 per cent or more of the men had volunteered for Overseas Service. The titles of these 2nd Line units would be the same as the original, but distinguished by a '2/' prefix. In this way duplicate battalions, brigades and divisions were created, mirroring those TF formations being sent overseas. Later, the 2nd Line was prepared for overseas service and a 3rd Line was formed to act as a reserve, providing trained replacements for the 1st and 2nd Line regiments.

=== 1/1st Glamorgan Yeomanry ===
By the end of August 1914 the 1/1st SWMB including the 1/1st Glamorgan Yeomanry joined the 1st Mounted Division in the Thetford area of Norfolk. 1/1st Glamorgan Yeomanry then moved to Aylsham and in October 1915 to Cromer. While training in East Anglia the division at the same time formed part of the defence forces for the East Coast, and there were numerous false invasion alarms.In November 1915 the 1/1st SWMB was dismounted.

The 1/1st SWMB embarked at Devonport on 4 March 1916, with the 1/1st Glamorgan Yeomanry aboard the SS Arcadian, and sailed to Egypt in company with the 1/1st Welsh Border Mounted Brigade from 1st Mtd Division. They disembarked at Alexandria on 14–15 March and on 20 March the two brigades were merged to form the 4th Dismounted Brigade. At first this was placed in the Suez Canal defences under 53rd (Welsh) Division, but in April it came under the command of Western Frontier Force (WFF).

Following the Senussi campaign of 1915, the WFF was left guarding Egypt's western and southern frontier against any further incursions. 4th Dismounted Brigade covered the Bahariya front with patrols and outposts, though any Senussi activity was further north, so the brigade saw no fighting. A number of officers and men of the 4th Dismounted Bde volunteered to transfer to the Imperial Camel Corps (ICC) and later a Glamorgan Yeomanry detachment joined an ICC motorised unit.

=== 24th (Pembroke and Glamorgan Yeomanry) Battalion, Welsh Regiment ===
At the beginning of 1917 the Egyptian Expeditionary Force (EEF) was preparing to advance across Sinai into Palestine and required additional infantry. The dismounted brigades on the western frontier began to move east. In January 1917 the dismounted yeomanry of 4th Dismounted Bde were permanently re-roled as infantry. The brigade became 231st Brigade, which joined 74th (Yeomanry) Division on its formation in March 1917.

Cavalry regiments were smaller than infantry battalions, so the dismounted yeomanry regiments were paired to form effective battalions and these were affiliated to infantry regiments. On 2 February, 1/1st Glamorgan Yeomanry amalgamated with 1/1st Pembroke Yeomanry to form 24th (Pembroke and Glamorgan Yeomanry) Battalion, Welsh Regiment. (Note: The Welsh Regiment often used the spelling 'Welch', but this was not officially adopted until 1921.)

As part of the 74th Yeomanry Division, the battalion was in reserve in the Second Battle of Gaza, and took part in the Third Battle of Gaza, the Battle of Beersheba, the capture and defence of Jerusalem and the Battle of Tell 'Asur. In May 1918, the Division moved to the Western Front, and the battalion saw action in the Hundred Days Offensive, including the Second Battle of Bapaume, the Battle of Épehy, and the final advance in Artois and Flanders. The 24th Welch entered Ath on 11 November 1918, only two and a half hours before hostilities ceased.

The battalion was disembodied on 5 July 1919 at Carmarthen.

=== 2/1st Glamorgan Yeomanry ===
The 2nd Line regiment was formed on 10 September 1914. In January 1915, it joined the 2/1st South Wales Mounted Brigade and by July it was in the Dorchester area. In September 1915, it moved with the brigade to Suffolk and joined the 1st Mounted Division. On 31 March 1916, the remaining Mounted Brigades were ordered to be numbered in a single sequence and the brigade became 4th Mounted Brigade.

In July 1916, there was a major reorganisation of 2nd Line yeomanry units in the United Kingdom. All but 12 regiments were converted to cyclists and as a consequence the regiment was converted to cyclists and the brigade became 2nd Cyclist Brigade (and the division became 1st Cyclist Division) at Yoxford. Further reorganisation in November 1916 saw the 1st Cyclist Division broken up and the regiment departing for the 1st Cyclist Brigade where it was amalgamated with the 2/1st Pembroke Yeomanry as the 2nd (Pembroke and Glamorgan) Yeomanry Cyclist Regiment. The regiment resumed its separate identity as 2/1st Glamorgan Yeomanry in March 1917 at Leiston. It moved to Benacre in July and to Worlingham near Beccles in 1st Cyclist Brigade at the end of the year. It was disbanded at Beccles on 29 October 1918 just before the end of the war.

=== 3/1st Glamorgan Yeomanry ===
The 3rd Line regiment was formed in 1915 and in the summer it was affiliated to a Reserve Cavalry Regiment at The Curragh. In the summer of 1916, it was dismounted and because its 1st Line was serving as infantry it was attached to the 3rd Line Groups of the Welsh Division. The regiment was disbanded in about February 1917 with the personnel transferring to the 2nd Line or to the 4th (Reserve) Battalion of the Welsh Regiment at Milford Haven.

== Interwar ==
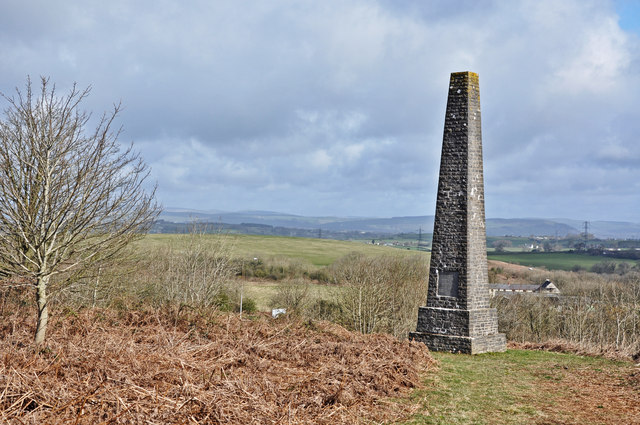
Glamorgan Yeomanry memorial unveiled in 1922 on Stalling Down Common, near Cowbridge.

The Glamorgan Yeomanry was reformed at Bridgend on 7 February 1920. However, wartime experience proved that there were too many mounted units, and when the TF was reconstituted as the Territorial Army (TA), only the 14 most senior Yeomanry regiments were retained as horsed cavalry, the remainder being converted to other roles, mainly artillery. On 1 November 1920, the Glamorgan Yeomanry was converted to artillery and became 324 (Glamorgan) Battery at Bridgend in 81st (Welsh) Brigade, Royal Field Artillery (RFA). The battery's title was changed to 324 (Glamorgan Yeomanry) Battery in June 1923. In 1924, the RFA was subsumed into the Royal Artillery (RA), and in 1938 the RA adopted the unit designation of regiment rather than brigade.

== World War II ==
=== Mobilisation ===
Formation sign of the 53rd (Welsh) Division.

The TA was doubled in size following the Munich Crisis of 1938, with existing units splitting to form duplicates before the outbreak of the Second World War. 81st (Welsh) Field Regiment was reorganised as two regiments, 81st and 132nd, with 324 (Glamorgan Yeomanry) Field Bty remaining as part of 81st. The regiment mobilised in 53rd (Welsh) Infantry Division.

Elements of 53rd (Welsh) Division were sent to Northern Ireland from October 1939, and the regiment joined it there in March 1940, remaining until April 1941, after which it returned to mainland Britain. By now, the batteries consisted of eight 25-pounder guns towed by Quad tractors. In 1942, the division joined XII Corps, training for the Allied invasion of Normandy (Operation Overlord).

=== North West Europe ===
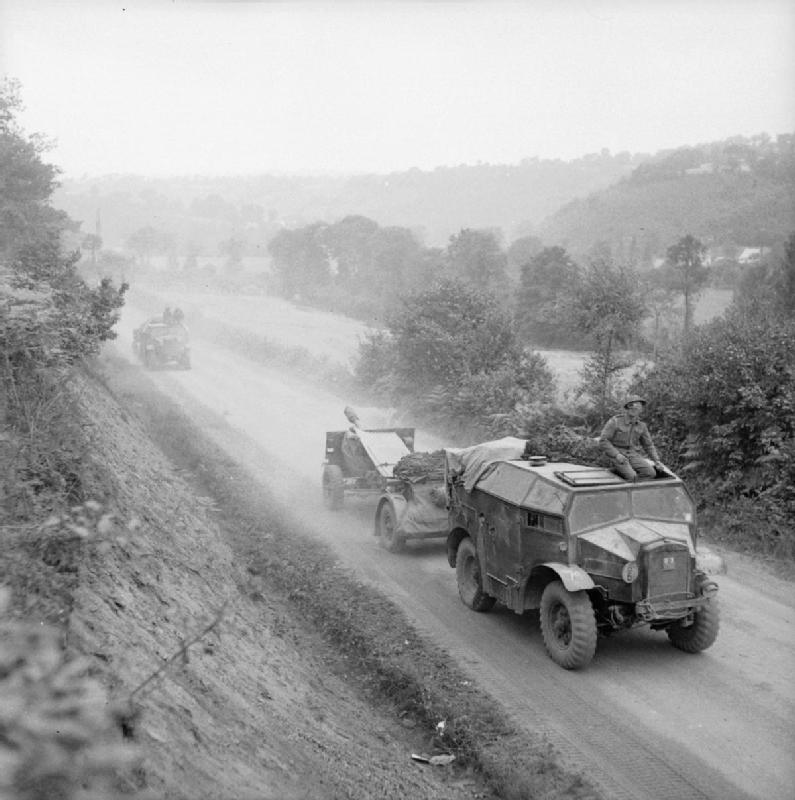
25-pounders and Quad tractors advancing in Normandy August 1944.

53rd (Welsh) Division was among the follow-up troops arriving after D-Day and completed its landing on 27 June. It was involved in the Second Battle of the Odon. When the breakout from the Normandy beachhead began in early August, 53rd Division helped in closing the Falaise Pocket. By late August, its units were across the Seine and driving over open country towards the River Somme.

The division had an important subsidiary role in Operation Market Garden, protecting the west flank of XXX Corps' main thrust. There was particularly hard fighting at Wintelre, west of Eindhoven, which the Germans held for two days, with the regiment firing several barrages and taking some casualties from return fire. 324 Battery fired from Veldhoven in direct support of 4th Royal Welsh Fusiliers' attack and afterwards of 7th Royal Welsh Fusiliers. During the fighting, the battery commander's half-track took a direct hit; he was unhurt, but the two men with him were killed. The divisional artillery's flank was open and on 1 October a party of Germans penetrated the positions and were engaged by the men of 324 Bty. On 7 October, the regiment moved into the Nijmegen bridgehead captured during Market Garden. On the afternoon of 11 October, the regiment's commanding officer was visiting 324's battery position when he was wounded by anti-personnel bombs dropped by Luftwaffe aircraft and had to be evacuated.

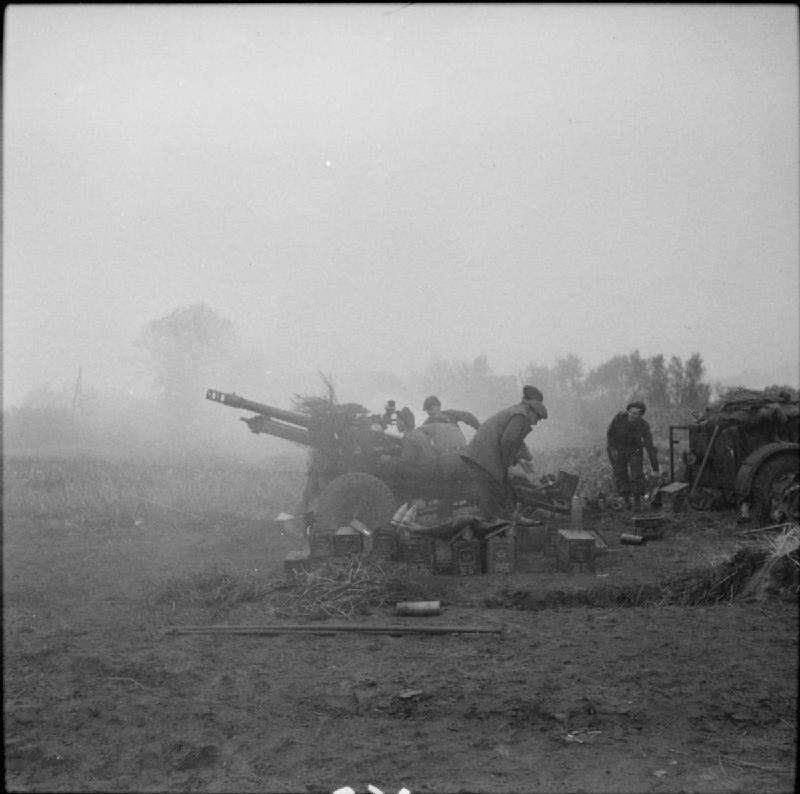
25-pounders in action during the advance on 's-Hertogenbosch, 23 October 1944.

After the failure of Market Garden, XII Corps was ordered to advance westwards towards 's-Hertogenbosch. The attack on s'Hertogenbosch (Operation Alan) began at 06.30 on 22 October, the infantry advancing behind a timed programme fired by the guns. The capture of the town took four days of house-to-house fighting, while the artillery fired on the Germans' escape routes.

Next, 81st Field Rgt moved to Wessem with 71 Brigade to relieve the Independent Belgian Brigade on the canal. 324 Battery's Observation Post (OP) was with C Squadron of the divisional Reconnaissance Regiment. On 14 November, the division crossed the Wessem canal (Operation Mallard) with support from the guns, and on 16 November the regiment struggled across the temporary bridges with 71 Bde, ending the day in front of the defended locality of Roermond. 71 Brigade attempted an assault crossing of the River Maas towards Roermond on the night of 21/22 November. Bridging operations were held up until the divisional artillery was able to suppress the German guns. 4th RWF, supported only by 81st Fd Rgt, made several abortive attempts to cross the anti-tank ditch, but 1st Oxfordshire and Buckinghamshire Light Infantry succeeded, aided by a smokescreen fired by 81st Fd Rgt.

Further operations were halted by winter weather. 71 Brigade Group including 81st Fd Rgt went for rest in Bocholt, Belgium. In December, the regiment was required to transfer some of its men to the infantry to make up for losses in the campaign so far. On 20 January 1945, the division moved to the Eindhoven area to refit and train for a special operation.

This operation, the Battle of the Reichswald (Operation Veritable), opened at 05.00 on 8 February with the heaviest concentration of artillery employed by the British Army so far in the war. 81st Field Rgt fired in support of 71 Bde as usual. 53rd Division's objectives were in the northern part of the Reichswald. Opposition was not strong but the terrain was difficult. By 02.00 on 9 February, the leading units were through the Siegfried Line defences and next day the division pushed on to the edge of the forest. It was hard to get guns and vehicles along the muddy forest tracks, 81st Field Rgt reporting that the second-in-command's OP tank had to be used to tow out bogged guns and tractors ('its only use; in all other respects it was an infernal nuisance'). Goch fell on 21 February.

53rd Division was not involved in the assault crossing of the Rhine (Operation Plunder) on 23/24 March, but crossed on 26 March and took part in the drive to the Elbe. The German surrender at Lüneburg Heath, ending the fighting on 21st Army Group's front, came on 4 May.

81st (Welsh) Field Regiment and its batteries were placed in suspended animation in 1946.

== Postwar ==
The regiment reformed at Port Talbot as 281st (Welsh) Field Regiment in 53rd (Welsh) Division.

281st (Welsh) Regiment still had a Glamorgan Yeomanry battery, and on 30 September 1953 the regiment was redesignated 281st (Glamorgan Yeomanry) Field Regiment, effectively ending the Glamorgan Artillery Volunteers lineage. On 31 October 1956, the regiment absorbed the Glamorgan batteries of 408 (Glamorgan and Pembroke) Coast Rgt and 887 Locating Battery, which had been formed in Cardiff in 1947.

This was followed on 1 May 1961 by amalgamation with 282nd (Welsh) Heavy Anti-Aircraft Rgt and 283rd (Monmouthshire) Field Rgt to form:

282nd (Glamorgan and Monmouthshire) Field Regiment, RA

- P (Glamorgan Yeomanry) Bty – from 281st Fd Rgt
- Q (Welsh) Bty – from 282nd HAA Rgt
- R (1 Monmouth) Bty – from 283rd Fd Rgt
- 509 (Motor Transport) Company, Royal Army Service Corps (RASC) – from surplus personnel of P Bty, 281st Fd Rgt, 282nd HAA Rgt Workshop, Royal Electrical and Mechanical Engineers, and 533 Co RASC

Finally, when the TA was reduced into the TAVR in 1967, the combined regiment became 211 (South Wales) Battery, Royal Artillery at Newport in 104 Light Air Defence Regiment, including:

- D (Monmouthshire) Troop at Newport
- E (Glamorgan Yeomanry) Troop at Cardiff
- F (Brecknockshire and Monmouthshire) Troop at Ebbw Vale

In 1986, 211 Bty provided a cadre for a new 217 (County of Gwent) Bty at Cwmbran, but this was reabsorbed by 211 Bty in 1992, when the battery was reduced to:

- C (Glamorgan Yeomanry) Troop at Cardiff
- D (Brecknockshire and Monmouthshire) Troop at Abertillery.

211 (South Wales) Bty continues in 104th Regiment Royal Artillery (Volunteers) in the Army Reserve today, currently as a close support unit equipped with the L118 light gun at Ty Llewellyn Army Reserve Centre in Cardiff.

== Heritage and ceremonial ==
=== Uniforms and insignia ===
The early yeomanry troops in Glamorgan wore Tarleton helmets and red jackets, the latter with black facings for the Swansea Troop and yellow for the Fairwood Troop. By 1815 the Cardiff Troop wore Shell jackets with yellow facings with bars of white cord across the front; the Talleton helmet had a leopardskin turban and a white plume. In 1820 the uniform was updated to Light Dragoon style with a blue Coatee and a Shako (black for officers, blue cloth for other ranks). The Central Glamorgan Corps wore white facings, the Llantrisant Corps buff.

When the Glamorgan Imperial Yeomanry was formed in 1901 it wore a khaki uniform with a Slouch hat turned up on the left side, with a white feather for dress parades.

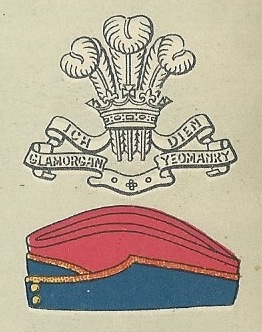
Glamorgan Yeomanry cap badge and Royal Artillery service cap, ca 1941.

Although designated as a dragoon regiment when it joined the TF, the uniform of the Glamorgan Yeomanry was influenced by lancer styling. The full dress uniform for officers of the Glamorgan Yeomanry in 1909 consisted of a blue shell jacket with white lancer-style plastron front and cuffs, worn with blue overalls carrying double white stripes, and a lancer-style gold and crimson striped waist girdle. The head-dress was a white sun helmet of doeskin-covered cork, wrapped in a white pugri and carrying a brass spike. A white leather cross-belt was worn carrying a black leather pouch. Other ranks had a parade or substitute full dress consisting of a dark blue tunic with pockets, silver shoulder chains and a silver leek collar badge, worn with a blue Peaked cap with white band and piping, and a brown bandolier. All ranks wore the universal khaki service dress with peaked cap introduced in 1902. The collar badge was a Welsh dragon, and the brass shoulder titles were 'T' over 'Y' over 'GLAMORGAN'. During World War I the 1/1st Glamorgan Yeomanry were re-badged when they joined 24th (P&GY) Bn Welsh Regiment, but the 2/1st and 3/1st continued to wear the yeomanry badges.

Between 1920 and about 1941, the officers and men of 324 (Glamorgan Yeomanry) Bty continued to wear the Glamorgan Yeomanry's cap badge. As collar badges, the officers wore gilt Welsh leeks on their blue patrol jackets and bronze regimental cap badges in service dress, while the other ranks wore Welsh Dragon badges. During and after the Second World War, the whole of 81st and 281st Field Rgts wore RA badges, but after 1967 their successors in the Glamorgan Yeomanry Troop of 211 (South Wales) Bty of 104th Light Air Defence Rgt were allowed the regimental collar badge in No 1 uniform.

=== Standards ===
The swallow-tailed standards of two of the early yeomanry units have been preserved. That of the Cardiff Troop is gold with the title 'CARDIFF YEOMANRY CAVALRY' within a wreath of roses and thistles; in opposite corners the White Horse of Hanover appears in a gold surround, in the other corners a rose and thistle motif. The absence of shamrock in the wreath and motif indicates that it predates the Acts of Union 1800. The standard was carried until disbandment in 1831. The standard of the Central Glamorgan Yeomanry is buff with the Red dragon of Wales on a green field within a Union wreath (including shamrock); in opposite corners the white horse on a red field surrounded in silver, in the other corners the intertwined letters CGY on a red ground. It was probably presented in 1820–1, and carried until disbandment.

=== Battle honours ===
The regiment was awarded the following Battle honours for its service in World War I (those in bold would have been inscribed on the standard):

- Somme, 1918
- Bapaume, 1918
- **Hindenburg Line**
- **Épehy**
- **Pursuit to Mons**
- **France and Flanders, 1918**
- **Egypt, 1916–17**
- **Gaza**
- **Jerusalem**
- **Jericho**
- **Tell 'Asur**
- **Palestine, 1917–18**

The Royal Artillery does not receive battle honours (its motto, Ubique ('Everywhere') granted by William IV in 1833 is deemed to cover all engagements), so none were awarded for World War II.

=== Honorary colonel ===
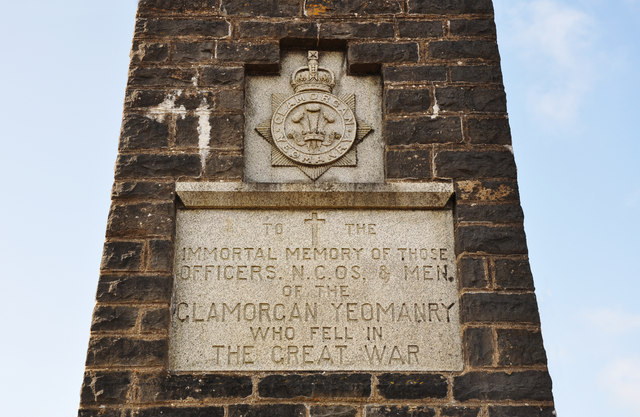
Detail of the Glamorgan Yeomanry's memorial obelisk.

Colonel Robert Windsor-Clive, 1st Earl of Plymouth, was appointed honorary colonel of the unit on 3 August 1901. He died in 1923.

=== Memorial ===
A memorial obelisk to the dead of the regiment in the First World War was erected at Stalling Down Common, near Cowbridge, and unveiled by the Earl of Plymouth on 2 November 1922.

== See also ==
- Imperial Yeomanry
- List of Yeomanry Regiments 1908
- Yeomanry
- Yeomanry order of precedence
- British yeomanry during the First World War
- Second line yeomanry regiments of the British Army
- List of British Army Yeomanry Regiments converted to Royal Artillery

== Bibliography ==
- L.S. Amery (ed.), The Times History of the War in South Africa 1899-1902, London: Sampson Low, Marston, 6 Vols 1900–09
- Anon, Regimental Badges and Service Caps, London: George Philip & Sons, 1941.
- Maj A.F. Becke,History of the Great War: Order of Battle of Divisions, Part 2a: The Territorial Force Mounted Divisions and the 1st-Line Territorial Force Divisions (42–56), London: HM Stationery Office, 1935/Uckfield: Naval & Military Press, 2007, ISBN 1-847347-39-8.
- Maj A.F. Becke,History of the Great War: Order of Battle of Divisions, Part 2b: The 2nd-Line Territorial Force Divisions (57th–69th), with the Home-Service Divisions (71st–73rd) and 74th and 75th Divisions, London: HM Stationery Office, 1937/Uckfield: Naval & Military Press, 2007, ISBN 1-847347-39-8.
- Ian F.W. Beckett, Riflemen Form: A Study of the Rifle Volunteer Movement 1859–1908, Aldershot: Ogilby Trusts, 1982, ISBN 0 85936 271 X.
- Col John K. Dunlop, The Development of the British Army 1899–1914, London: Methuen, 1938.
- Major L.F. Ellis, History of the Second World War, United Kingdom Military Series: Victory in the West, Vol I: The Battle of Normandy, London: HM Stationery Office, 1962/Uckfield: Naval & Military, 2004, ISBN 1-845740-58-0.
- Major L.F. Ellis, History of the Second World War, United Kingdom Military Series: Victory in the West, Vol II: The Defeat of Germany, London: HM Stationery Office, 1968/Uckfield: Naval & Military, 2004, ISBN 1-845740-59-9.
- Gen Sir Martin Farndale, History of the Royal Regiment of Artillery: The Years of Defeat: Europe and North Africa, 1939–1941, Woolwich: Royal Artillery Institution, 1988/London: Brasseys, 1996, ISBN 1-85753-080-2.
- J.B.M. Frederick, Lineage Book of British Land Forces 1660–1978, Vol I, Wakefield: Microform Academic, 1984, ISBN 1-85117-007-3.
- J.B.M. Frederick, Lineage Book of British Land Forces 1660–1978, Vol II, Wakefield: Microform Academic, 1984, ISBN 1-85117-009-X.
- Brig E.A. James, British Regiments 1914–18, London: Samson Books, 1978, ISBN 0-906304-03-2/Uckfield: Naval & Military Press, 2001, ISBN 978-1-84342-197-9.
- Steven John, Welsh Yeomanry at War: A History of the 24th (Pembroke & Glamorgan Yeomanry) Battalion, The Welsh Regiment, Barnsley: Pen & Sword, 2016, ISBN 978-1-47383-362-3.
- Norman E.H. Litchfield, The Territorial Artillery 1908–1988 (Their Lineage, Uniforms and Badges), Nottingham: Sherwood Press, 1992, ISBN 0-9508205-2-0.
- Norman Litchfield & Ray Westlake, The Volunteer Artillery 1859–1908 (Their Lineage, Uniforms and Badges), Nottingham: Sherwood Press, 1982, ISBN 0-9508205-0-4.
- William McElwee, The Art of War, Littlehampton Book Services, 1975, ISBN 978-0-29776865-4.
- Mileham, Patrick (1994). The Yeomanry Regiments; 200 Years of Tradition. Edinburgh: Canongate Academic. ISBN 1-898410-36-4.
- Bryn Owen, Glamorgan – Its Gentlemen and Yeomanry, 1797 to 1908, Newport, Gwent: Starling Press, 1983, ISBN 0-903434-61-X.
- Bryn Owen, History of the Welsh Militia and Volunteer Corps 1757–1908, Vol 2: The Glamorgan Regiments of Militia, Caernarfon: Palace Books, 1990, ISBN 1-871904-01-3.
- Bryn Owen, History of the Welsh Militia and Volunteer Corps 1757–1908. Vol 3: Glamorgan Part 2: Volunteers and Local Militia, 1796–1816; Yeomanry Cavalry, 1808–31, Wrexham: Bridge Books, 1994, ISBN 1-872424-34-1.
- Rinaldi, Richard A (2008). Order of Battle of the British Army 1914. Ravi Rikhye. ISBN 978-0-97760728-0.
- Col H.C.B. Rogers, The Mounted Troops of the British Army 1066–1945, London: Seeley Service, 1959.
- Edward M. Spiers, The Army and Society 1815–1914, London: Longmans, 1980, ISBN 0-582-48565-7.
- Philip Talbot, 'The English Yeomanry in the Nineteenth Century and the Great Boer War', Journal of the Society for Army Historical Research, Vol 79, No 317 (Spring 2001), pp. 45–62.
- War Office, A List of the Officers of the Militia, the Gentlemen & Yeomanry Cavalry, and Volunteer Infantry of the United Kingdom, 11th Edn, London: War Office, 14 October 1805/Uckfield: Naval and Military Press, 2005, ISBN 978-1-84574-207-2.
- Steve Watt, 'The Imperial Yeomanry, Part 1 – 1900', South African Military History Society, Military History Journal, vol 13, no. 6, December 2006.
- Who was Who, 1951–1960, London: A&C Black 1961.
- Robert and Christopher Wilkinson-Latham, Cavalry Unifoms of Britain and the Commonwealth, Including Other Mounted Arms, London: Blandford, 1969, ISBN 0-7137-0134-X.

=== External links ===
- Anglo Boer War
- Mark Conrad, The British Army, 1914 (archive site)
- British Army units from 1945 on
- The Drill Hall Project
- Great War Centenary Drill Halls.
- Imperial War Museum, War Memorials Register
- The Long, Long Trail
- Orders of Battle at Patriot Files Archived 26 March 2023 at the Wayback Machine
- The Regimental Warpath 1914–1918 (archive site)
- Land Forces of Britain, the Empire and Commonwealth – Regiments.org (archive site)
- Royal Artillery 1939–1945
- Royal Artillery Units Netherlands 1944–1945
- Graham Watson, The Territorial Army 1947
