= Ysgol Gyfun Gymraeg Llangynwyd =

Location
- Maesteg, Bridgend, CF34 9RW; Wales; 51.5825°N 3.6333°W

Information
- Type: State secondary school
- Motto: Dysg ... Dawn ... Dyfodol (Learning ... Talent ... Future)
- Religious affiliation: None
- Established: 2008
- Local authority: Bridgend
- Chair: Andrew Lewis
- Head teacher: Catrin Evans
- Gender: Coeducational
- Age: 11 to 18
- Language: Welsh language
- Houses: Garw (Red), Ogwr (Blue), Llynfi (Green), Lluest, Ffaldau, Cwmdu, Garth
- Colours: Turquoise and light grey White and dark grey (Sixth Form)
- Website: YGG Llangynwyd

Ysgol Gyfun Gymraeg Llangynwyd is a Welsh-medium secondary school for pupils aged between 11 and 18. The school is based in the village of Llangynwyd in the borough of Bridgend, Wales. The school opened on 3 September 2008 on the site of the former Maesteg Comprehensive Upper School in Llangynwyd. It is the only secondary school in the borough of Bridgend to use the Welsh language as the primary medium of education.

As of 2023, there were a total of 712 pupils on roll at the school, with 111 in the sixth form. In 2023, 30.7% of pupils come from Welsh-speaking households.

The school is fed from the four Welsh medium primary schools in Bridgend County Borough:

- Ysgol Cynwyd Sant, Maesteg
- Ysgol Bro Ogwr, Brackla
- Ysgol y Ferch o'r Sger, Cornelly
- Ysgol Calon y Cymoedd, Bettws

The school's motto is "Dysg ... Dawn ... Dyfodol" (Learning ... Talent ... Future). Pupils in Key Stage 3 and Key Stage 4 are currently grouped into three houses: Garw, Ogwr, and Llynfi. These houses represent the main valleys and rivers that form the catchment area of the school. This changes when the pupils move onto the sixth form, where the four houses are instead Lluest, Ffaldau, Cwmdu, and Garth, which represent other various locations in South Wales. Unlike the non-sixth form houses, these houses do not have representative colours.

== Notable alumni ==
- Owen Watkin
- Dewi Lake
