= Ysgol Maesteg School =

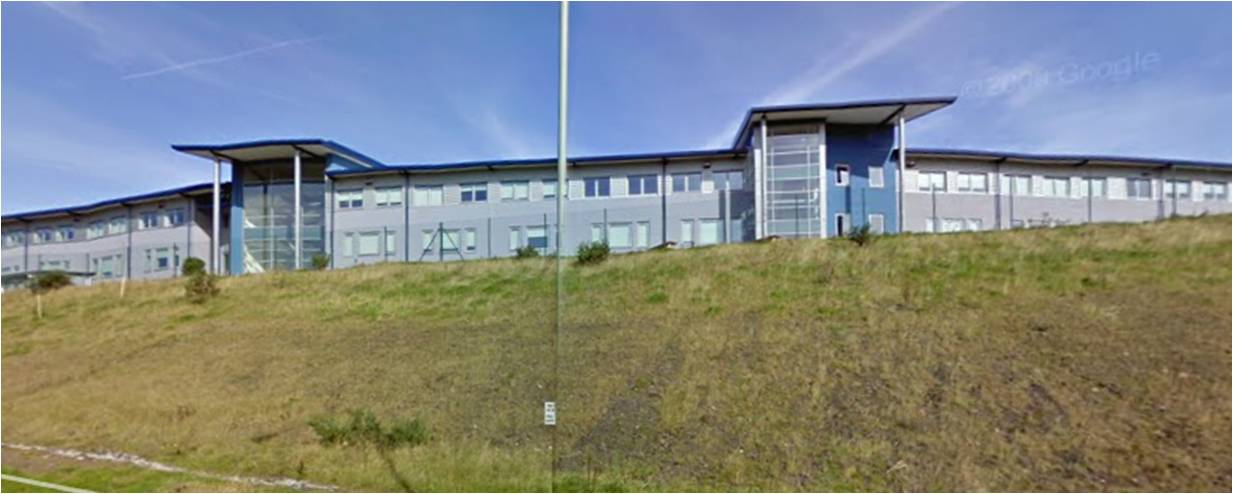

Location
- Ffordd Dysgu; Maesteg, Bridgend, CF34 0LQ; Wales
- Coordinates: 51°36′43″N 3°39′08″W

Information
- Type: Comprehensive School
- Motto: Motivated to Strive
- Established: 2008; 18 years ago (At the new site)
- Local authority: Bridgend
- Department for Education URN: 401791 Tables
- Ofsted: Reports
- Headteacher: Helen Jones
- Age: 11 (year 7) to 19 (year13/14)
- Houses: Cadrawd (Yellow), Daren(Green), Cynwyd(Red), Llynfi(Blue)
- Colours: Black and Amber
- Website: maestegcs.bridgend.sch.uk

Ysgol Maesteg School is an English language comprehensive school situated in the town of Maesteg in the South Wales Valleys of south-eastern Wales. The former and more commonly used name of the school is Maesteg Comprehensive School, or Ysgol Gyfun Maesteg. Its uniform shows the name as Ysgol Maesteg.

As of September 2017, Maesteg Comprehensive School introduced a mobile phone ban to prevent cyberbullying and changed the uniform.

The school's old site was taken over by the newly established Welsh medium school, Ysgol Gyfun Gymraeg Llangynwyd, on 3 September 2008 and has recently been downgraded from being a green rated school down 2 spaces to an amber. The school was rated band 2 (one of the higher performing schools in Wales) after being recently upgraded from band 3 as part of the Welsh governments school banding system, with over 55% of its pupils living in the 20% most deprived areas of Wales. 42% of its students achieved 5 A*-C GCSEs including English or Welsh + Maths in 2010.

As of 2020/2021, the school has 82.5% of students in the school on the ALN list.

The school was originally a split site, with a site at Llwynderw, which has since been demolished and is now a residential estate.

== Feeder schools ==
- Caerau Primary School
- Plasnewydd Primary School
- Garth Primary School
- Cwmfelin Primary School
- Nantyfyllon Primary School
- Llangynwyd Primary School
