= Sidney Wilcox =

Welsh cricketer

Personal information
- Full name: Sidney Charles Wilcox
- Born: 28 February 1893; Maesteg, Glamorgan, Wales
- Died: 21 October 1973 (aged 80); Maesteg, Glamorgan, Wales
- Batting: Right-handed
- Role: Wicket-keeper

Domestic team information
- Years: Team
- 1930: Wales
- 1921–1934: Monmouthshire

Career statistics
Competition	First-class
Matches	1
Runs scored	7
Batting average	7.00
100s/50s	–/–
Top score	6
Balls bowled	–
Wickets	–
Bowling average	–
5 wickets in innings	–
10 wickets in match	–
Best bowling	–
Catches/stumpings	3/1
- Source: Cricinfo, 30 August 2011

Sidney Charles Wilcox (28 February 1893 – 21 October 1973) was a Welsh cricketer. Wilcox was a right-handed batsman who fielded as a wicket-keeper. He was born in Maesteg, Glamorgan.

Wilcox made his debut for Monmouthshire in the 1921 Minor Counties Championship against Cornwall. He played Minor counties cricket for the county from 1921 to 1934, making 90 appearances. During his career he played a single first-class match for Wales against the Minor Counties in 1930. In Wales first-innings he was dismissed for 7 runs by Eric Stroud, while in their second-innings he was unbeaten on 1. Behind the stumps he took 3 catches in the match and made a single stumping.

He died in the town of his birth on 21 October 1973.
