= Maesteg Town Hall =

Municipal Building in Maesteg, Wales

- Neuadd y Dref Maesteg (Welsh)
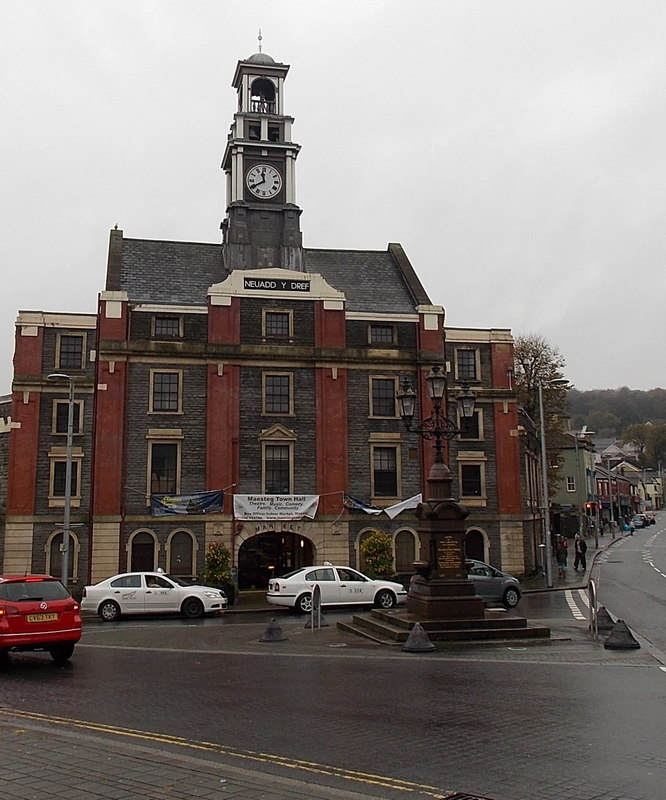
- Maesteg Town Hall

- Shown in Bridgend County Borough
- 51.6090°N 3.6583°W
- Location: Talbot Street, Maesteg

History
- Built: 1881

Site notes
- Architect: Henry Harris
- Architectural style: Neoclassical style

Listed Building – Grade II
- Official name: Town Hall
- Designated: 14 July 1997
- Reference no.: 18494

Maesteg Town Hall (Welsh: Neuadd y Dref Maesteg) is a municipal structure in Talbot Street, Maesteg, Wales. The town hall is a Grade II listed building.

== History ==
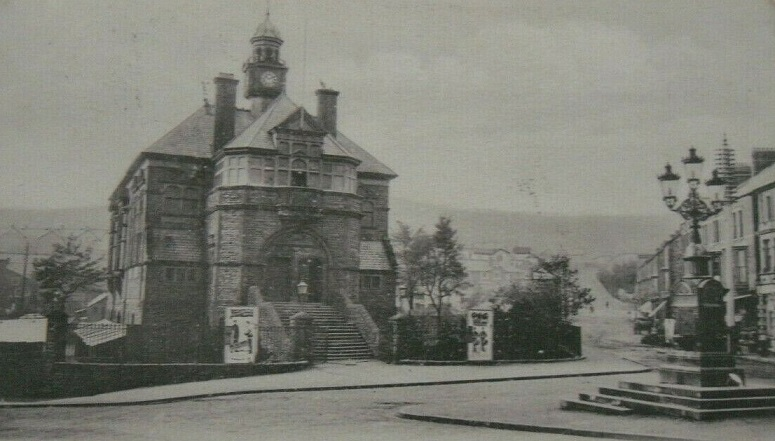
The town hall as it appeared in the early 20th century

In the 1870s, the local board of health decided to procure a purpose-built municipal building for the town: the building was financed by public subscription with the local member of parliament, C. R. M. Talbot, contributing £500 and the local miners donating a day's wages. The foundation stone for the new building was laid by Talbot, in his capacity of Lord Lieutenant of Glamorgan, on 31 October 1880. It designed by Henry Harris of Cardiff in the Queen Anne Revival style, built by G. Thomas & Sons in rubble masonry at a cost of £3,000 and was officially opened by the chairman of the Llynfi, Tondu and Ogmore Coal and Iron Company, David Chadwick, on 22 October 1881. The original design involved a symmetrical main frontage with three bays facing onto the Market Square; the central bay, which projected forward and was canted, featured a flight of steps leading up to a round headed opening containing two doors. There was a bay window on the floor above, a central pediment at attic level and a tower with a belfry and a dome at roof level. Internally, the principal room was the main hall.

Following significant population growth, largely associated with coal mining, the area became an urban districtin 1894. A lamp and fountain to commemorate the life of the local doctor and benefactor, William Hopkin Thomas, was designed by W. H. Rees and unveiled outside the town hall in 1900. The suffragette, Emmeline Pankhurst, spoke at a rally held in the town hall in April 1912.

The new civic leaders decided to increase the height of the building to four floors in order to accommodate an enlarged covered market and also to provide increased massing to the building which was at the lower end of the Market Square: following completion of the remodelling work, which was carried out in the neoclassical style by S. J. Harper, the building was officially re-opened on 25 November 1914. The new design involved a symmetrical main frontage with five bays facing onto the Market Square; the central bay featured a wide entrance to the new covered market and was flanked by a series of round headed windows. On the upper floors there were a series of sash windows flanked by red brick pilasters supporting a pediment containing the words "Neuadd y Dref" (English: town hall). There was a clock tower with a belfry and a dome at roof level.

Queen Mary attended a social services function at the town hall in April 1938, the actor, Richard Burton, performed as a child at a local eisteddfod in the building in 1939 and the contralto singer, Kathleen Ferrier, made an appearance on 13 May 1944. Another visitor was the actor and politician, Arnold Schwarzenegger, who performed at a bodybuilding contest there in 1967.

In 2016, Bridgend County Borough Council announced plans to refurbish the building and, based on a design by Purcell Architecture, to convert it into a community hub at a cost of £6 million. Once the last of the market traders had left the market hall in April 2018, an extensive programme of refurbishment works, which included the construction of a new glass atrium and an extension to accommodate a new café, commenced in March 2020. Works of art in the town hall include seven paintings by the local artist, Christopher Williams.
