= James Morgan (actor) =

Welsh actor (born 1985)

- Born: 8 August 1985 (age 40); Maesteg, Wales, UK
- Occupation: Actor
- Years active: 2002–present

James Morgan (born 8 August 1985) is a Welsh actor.

== Career ==
=== Stage ===
Morgan was born in Maesteg, South Wales on 8 August 1985. He began acting in 1996, at the age of ten, when he was cast in the role of Charlie Bates in the Maesteg Amateur Operatic Society production of Oliver!. He built up a reputation through acting in pantomime and musical theatre performances in the local community. He began to accrue significant roles on stage including Chino in West Side Story and Cosmo in Singin' in the Rain for Bridgend County Youth Theatre.

This led to the role of Mark Anthony in A Chorus Line at the Sherman Theatre in Cardiff as part of the International Festival of Musical Theatre in 2005.

In 2008 Morgan joined the Swansea Little Theatre - the company that once counted Dylan Thomas as a member - playing George Milton in John Steinbeck's Of Mice and Men at the Dylan Thomas Theatre. The production received favourable reviews, earning him a Best Actor nomination at the Glammie Awards in South Wales.

In 2010 he returned to Swansea, playing the role of Ethan in the musical adaptation of The Full Monty. With positive reviews after a full house run at the Dylan Thomas Theatre the show was transferred to the Grand Theatre, Swansea for a one-off final performance.

2019 saw Morgan back at the Dylan Thomas Theatre, this time playing Dylan Thomas in the play 3 Knights and 2 Welshmen, about the friendship between the Welsh poet and actor Richard Burton. Inspired by actual events, the play was set in an Austrian hotel during the production of eight-hour epic Wagner (which also featured Sir John Gielgud, Sir Ralph Richardson, and Sir Laurence Olivier, who all appear as characters in the play). He followed this up with a turn as John Proctor in Arthur Miller's The Crucible at the Grand Theatre, Swansea, a performance which was described as "faultless" by the UK's National Operatic and Dramatic Association, and earned him a NODA Wales & Ireland award for Best Individual Performance in a Drama.

2020 saw Morgan make his London West End debut in The Man Whose Hair Grew Black playing the role of Brian Thomas for Gurnwah Productions at the Leicester Square Theatre in February.

=== Screen ===
Away from the stage, Morgan has taken a series of roles in television, with parts in the ITV Wales shorts What Goes on Tour and Covered - the latter winning him the Best Actor prize at the It's My Shout Awards in South Wales in 2004.

In 2010 Morgan appeared on BBC1 in The Indian Doctor, a period comedy-drama set in the 1960s, with a cast that included Sanjeev Bhaskar, Ayesha Dharker, Mark Williams and Beth Robert. 2012 saw his return to show playing the role of minor Harri. In 2011 he appeared in the lead role of Jason Rees in the Seraphim Pictures short film The Final Punchline. In 2014 he made a return to television in 24: Live Another Day as a DSS Agent for 1 episode, and followed this up in 2016 playing Morgan in "The Corpse Series" which was released through Crypt TV in the US in 2017.

In 2018 he was cast in Human Resources, the first episode of the Watchers Productions series Strange Tales, playing the role of Noah.
