= Cwmdu =

Cwmdu may refer to several locations in Wales:

- Cwmdu, Carmarthenshire, a United Kingdom location
- Cwmdu, Powys
- Cwmdu, Swansea
