= Maesteg =

Town and community in Wales

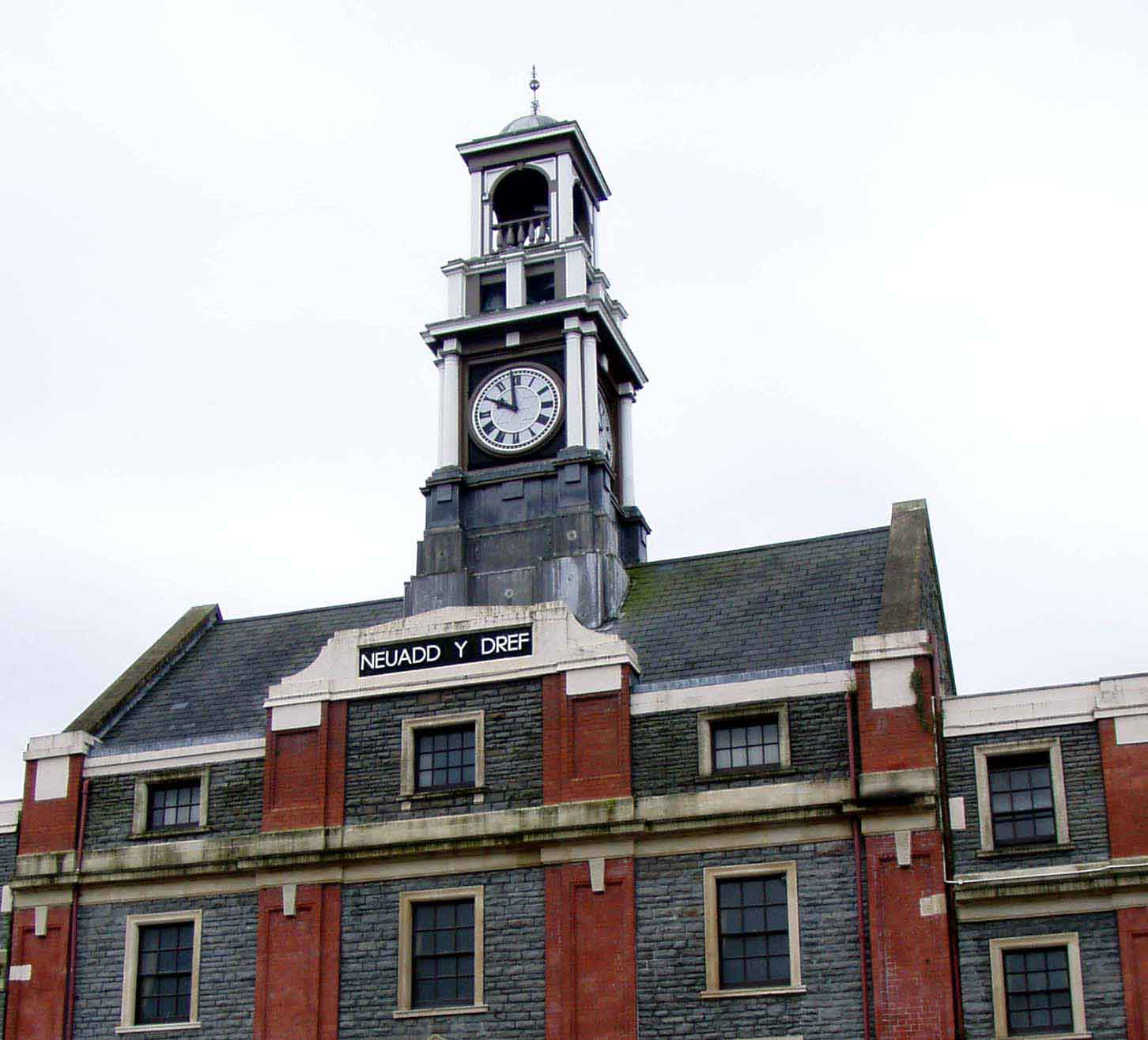
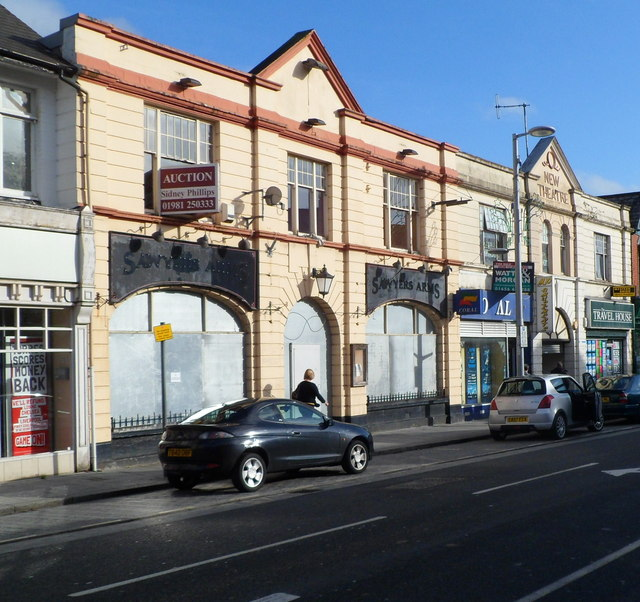
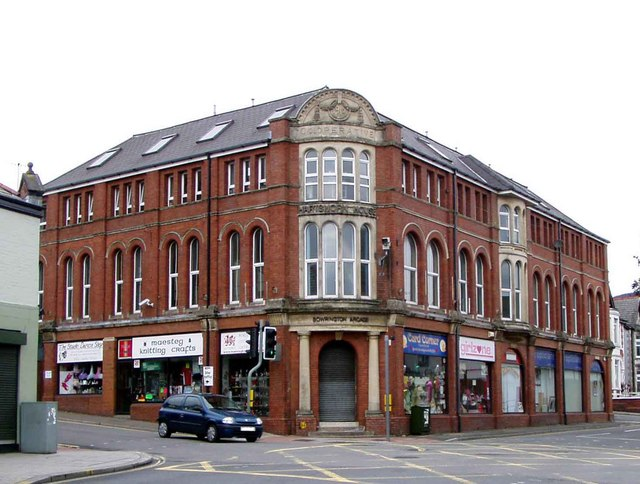
- From the top, Maesteg Town Hall, Commercial Street, Hartshorn House

- Location within Bridgend
- Population: 21,000 (2011)
- OS grid reference: SS855915
  - Cardiff: 27.5
  - London: 173.0
- Community: Maesteg
- Principal area: Bridgend
- Preserved county: Mid Glamorgan
- Country: Wales
- Sovereign state: United Kingdom
- Post town: MAESTEG
- Postcode district: CF34
- Dialling code: 01656
- Police: South Wales
- Fire: South Wales
- Ambulance: Welsh
- UK Parliament: Aberafan Maesteg
- Senedd Cymru – Welsh Parliament: Afan Ogwr Rhondda
- Website: maestegcouncil.org
- List of places UK Wales Bridgend 51.61°N 3.65°W Map of the community

Maesteg (English: /ˌmaɪsˈteɪɡ, -tɛɡ/; Welsh: [maisˈteːɡ]) is a town and community in Bridgend County Borough, Wales. Maesteg lies at the northernmost end of the Llynfi Valley, close to the border with Neath Port Talbot. In 2011, Maesteg had a population of 20,612. The English translation of Maesteg is 'fair field'.

Maesteg officially became a town in 1826 and is celebrating its bicentenary in 2026 with organised events and celebrations being organised by a committee of residents and local groups and businesses.

Historically a part of Glamorgan, the growth of the town started with the opening of ironworks in the 1820s and 1830s. Once a coal mining area, the last pit closed in 1985. With the decline of the coal industry and, more recently, the closure of one large factory producing cosmetics and another manufacturing vehicle components, the valley has become a residential/dormitory area for the Port Talbot, Bridgend and Cardiff journey to work areas. 11% (1,867 out of 20,702) of the town's population speak Welsh with 27.9% of 3-15 year olds speaking the language. It is one of the few areas of Wales where the traditional Mari Lwyd is still celebrated during Christmas.

The community of Maesteg had a population of 17,580 in the 2011 census and includes Nantyffyllon. The built-up area having a population of 21,000.

== History ==
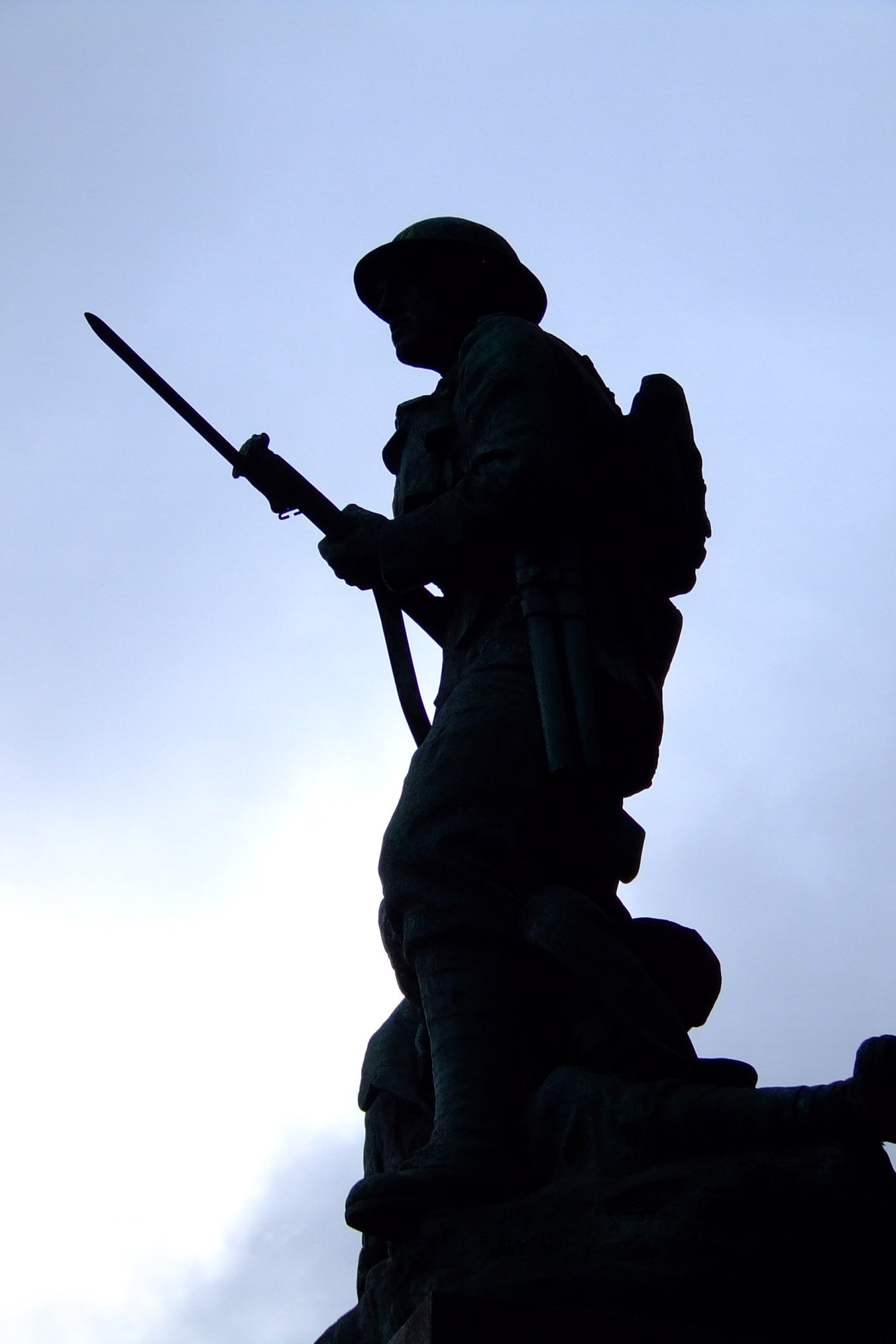
The war memorial in Maesteg town centre.

Before the development of industry in the 1820s, the Llynfi Valley was a sparsely populated area of scattered farms. The nearest settlement was the village of Llangynwyd, located on the hillside about two miles (three kilometres) south of the present-day town centre of Maesteg. Close to Llangynwyd is an extensive earthwork known as Y Bwlwarcau ("the bulwarks"), an Iron Age enclosure that is probably a remnant of the earliest settlement in the Llynfi district.

During the Middle Ages, the valley was part of Tir Iarll (the Earl's Land), an area "famous for its game coverts, its woods and sparkling streams" that was set aside as a hunting reserve by Robert Fitzhamon, Earl of Gloucester, the Norman conqueror of Glamorgan. Up to the 18th century, many of the farms of the Llynfi Valley were centres of local culture. For example, Llwydarth, the home of the influential Powell family, was a centre for writers and poets in Glamorgan in the 17th century.

According to the Daily Telegraph, Maesteg was the first place in the UK where Japanese knotweed was spotted in the wild, sometime before 1886.

== Industrial history ==
The origins of the present-day community in the Llynfi Valley date from the late 1820s, when the area's considerable coal and iron ore resources were developed on an industrial scale for the first time. In 1828, a 15-mile (24-kilometre) horse-drawn railway was completed between Porthcawl and Garnlwyd in the Llynfi Valley. This was the Dyffryn Llynfi and Porthcawl Railway (DLPR); it was extended to the Coegnant district near the head of the valley in 1830. The railway opened up the district and led to the formation of an iron company, which began building a works on Maesteg Uchaf Farm, near the site of the present-day town centre, in 1826. The Maesteg Ironworks Company took its name from the farm, and by 1831 two blast furnaces were in operation and the first rows of workers' housing had been completed near the Maesteg Ironworks. Around the same time, one of the first zinc smelters in Wales was set up on Coegnant Farm near the northern terminus of the DLPR.

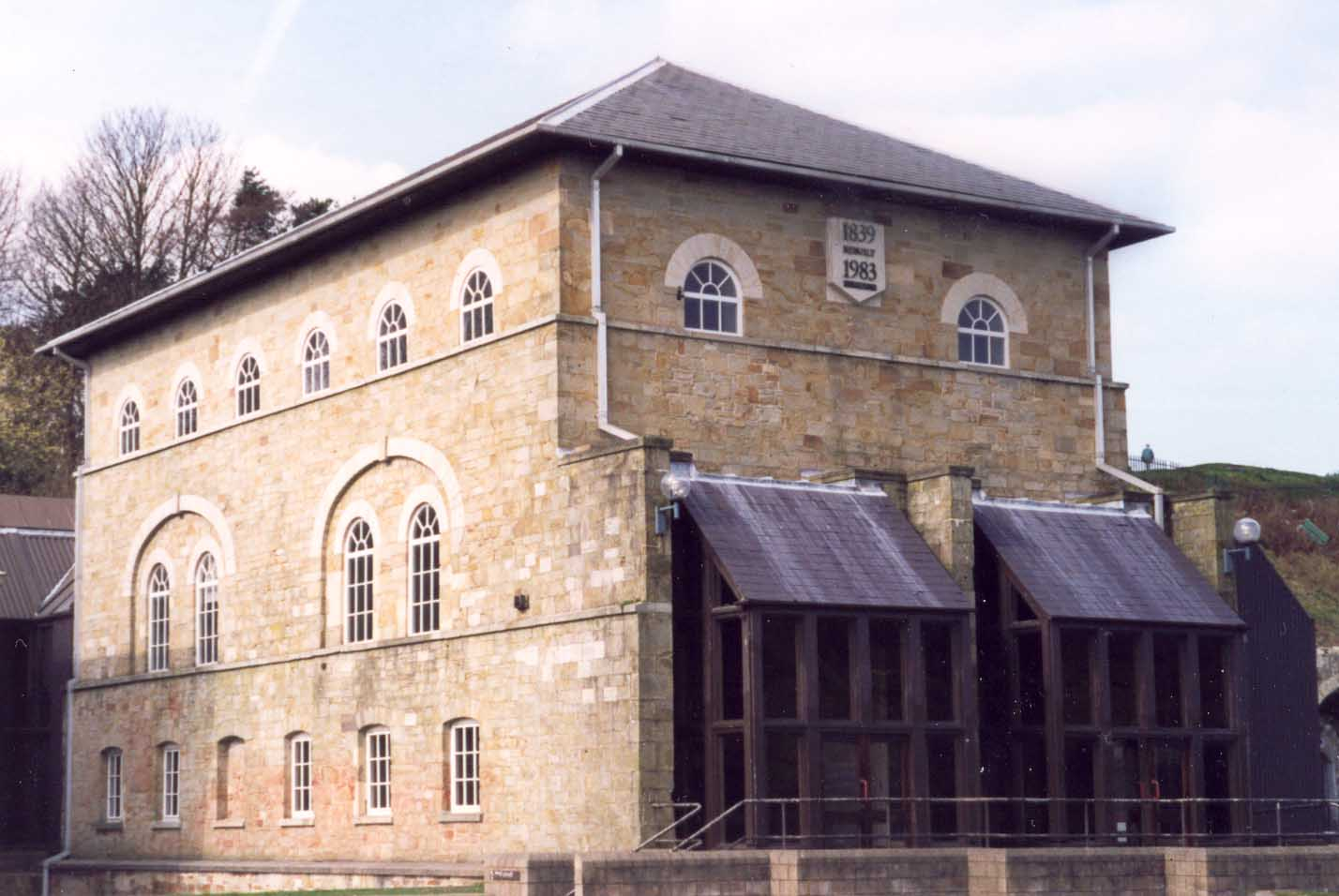
Part of the Maesteg Sports Centre.

In 1839, work on a second, larger, ironworks commenced at Nantycrynwydd Farm on a site now largely occupied by the Tesco store and car park. The works, which became known as the Llynfi Ironworks (or "The New Works"), was started by the unsuccessful Cambrian Iron and Spelter Company and was bought by the ambitious Llynvi Iron Company in 1845. The Cornstores section of the Maesteg Sports Centre and the adjoining base of a blast furnace remain as links to the Llynfi Works and the valley's significant 19th century iron industry. The two ironworks, with associated collieries and new housing, transformed an area of scattered farms with a population of about 400 in 1821 into a growing township with a population of 4,000 by 1841.

The Cambrian/Llynfi Works attracted investment capital from a number of prominent figures of the early Victorian period, including the poet William Wordsworth, who was a Cambrian shareholder in the early 1840s, the gin distiller Sir Felix Booth, and the writer and radical politician Dr John Bowring. Bowring invested heavily in the Llynfi Works in the mid-1840s and, for a number of years, that part of the valley around his works was known as Bowrington. During his association with the Maesteg district, he campaigned in Parliament for a decimal system of coinage and was largely responsible for the introduction of Britain's first decimal coin, the florin or two shilling piece (now the ten pence piece). John Bowring lost his capital in the trade depression of the late 1840s, although the iron company continued trading. After his Llynfi venture, John Bowring became British Consul in Canton, China, and was Governor of Hong Kong from 1854 to 1859.

The iron industry in Maesteg continued, with varying degrees of success, until wrought iron making was replaced by the manufacture of cheaper, mass-produced steel during the 1870s. In its heyday, after the opening of the broad gauge, steam-hauled Llynfi Valley Railway in 1861, the Llynfi Works had a reputation for producing high-quality iron. In the mid-Victorian period there was a flourishing export trade to Southern Italy and Turkey; rails were exported to the United States and Llynvi "Navy Quality" No.3 Cable Iron was highly regarded by the makers of Admiralty-tested anchor chains. However, as the Llynfi site could not be adapted for the production of steel, iron making ceased in the Maesteg area in 1885.

During the mid-1880s, with the closure of the Llynfi Works and its associated collieries, the Maesteg district, with a population of about 10,000, faced an uncertain future. However, the local coal industry then began to expand with the formation of North's Navigation Collieries Ltd in 1889. The colliery company was led by Colonel North, the "Nitrate King". In 1900, another company, led by Sir Alfred Jones of the Elder Dempster shipping line, also developed collieries in the valley. Due to the expansion programme set in motion by the two mining companies, two of the local, former iron company collieries (Coegnant and Garth) were modernised, and two new large collieries were sunk at Caerau and St John's (Cwmdu). With the development of the coal industry, the local population increased from about 10,000 in 1891 to almost 30,000 in 1921.

Between 1890 and 1925, the valley gained a worldwide reputation as a producer of Admiralty-grade steam coal, high quality coking coal and what was regarded as the best house coal in South Wales. Due to the quality of the steam coal, North's Imperial Navigation coal was included on the prestigious Admiralty List of the twenty–six best Welsh steam coals. In 1908, the Cunard liner Mauretania was entirely fired by Llynfi coal when the ship established a new record for crossing the Atlantic. By the early 1920s there were over 7,000 miners at work in the valley. However, as the area depended to such a large extent on the coal export trade, it was seriously affected by the trade depression of 1928–38. During that period of acute poverty and large-scale unemployment, the population of the Llynfi Valley decreased by almost a third as many left the district to seek employment in the new light industries growing up in areas such as West London and the English Midlands.

For many years after the Second World War, the local coal industry employed well over 2,000 workers and new jobs were created in local government-built factories and in new industries in the Port Talbot and Bridgend journey-to-work areas. Due to the buoyant coal industry and the success of the new factories during the years 1950–75, the population of Maesteg and district stabilised at about 20,000, roughly the figure today. With the creation of more jobs in the Bridgend and Port Talbot districts, the Llynfi Valley gradually became a residential area, a process which speeded up with the terminal decline of the coal industry during the period 1977 to 1985.

Llynfi Valley metal-working centres

Name	In Production	Maximum Workforce
Coegnant Spelter (zinc) Works	1830–1847	95 in 1839
Maesteg Iron Works	1828–1860	561 in 1841
Llynfi Iron Works	1839–1885	2,000 in 1870
Llwydarth Tinplate Works	1868–1900	470 in 1886

Llynfi Valley collieries

Name	Sinking Commenced	Year of Closure	Maximum Workforce
Garth	1864	1930	1,007 in 1907
Oakwood (Davis's Pit)	1868	1928	495 in 1899
Coegnant,	1881	1981	2,182 in 1914
Caerau	1890	1977	2,432 in 1922
Maesteg Deep	1868	1930	671 in 1910
St John's (Cwmdu)	1908	1985	1,479 in 1920

== Demography ==
2011 Census
Population of Maesteg Community (all ages) (17,580)	100%
Number of people speaking Welsh (Maesteg) (1,867)	11%
:Average in Wales	19%
Number born in Wales (Maesteg) (16319)	92.8%
:Average in Wales	73%
Number in work between 16 and 74 years of age(Maesteg) (3,412)	45.2%
:Average in Wales	67.1%

== Economy ==
=== Maesteg Market ===
Maesteg Market was situated at the ground floor level of Maesteg Town Hall and offered a variety of goods until the final stallholder left in 2018. This space has now home to Maesteg's library.

== Transport ==
=== Railway ===
Maesteg has three railway stations, all on the Maesteg Line. Services are operated by Transport for Wales and run directly to Cardiff Central via Bridgend. The services usually continue to Cheltenham Spa via Newport and Gloucester with one early morning service to Ebbw Vale Town. Previous, long-distance extensions to London Waterloo and Wrexham General were short lived. The terminus station is Maesteg; the other two stations are the most recently built Maesteg (Ewenny Road), and Garth station which serves the Garth and Cwmfelin villages situated just outside Maesteg. The Rail linc bus service used to replace a withdrawn rail service from Maesteg to Caerau, but it was removed in January 2012 due to council cutbacks.

In the past, there were other railway stations in Maesteg. Llangynwyd Station used to lie on the Maesteg line a few miles east of where Garth Station is today, and Maesteg (Neath Road) was on the old Port Talbot Railway Line, but these are now closed.

The original Maesteg station was situated a few yards west of the terminus that is there today. Remains of the original station remain behind the Asda supermarket, including the platforms and the bridge joining the two platforms. The old track was removed in 2007 during a land reclamation project. The present stations were reopened by British Rail in 1992.

=== Buses ===
Maesteg bus station is situated to the rear of the town hall. First Cymru operate the majority of the services from this station. Services run to Bridgend, Swansea via Port Talbot, Caerau Park, Llangynwyd and Cymmer.

== Welsh language ==
In common with the rest of Wales, the town has two official languages, English and Welsh. The majority of people in Maesteg are native English speakers, but there is a Welsh-speaking minority. The 2011 census reported that 11% of people over the age of 3 spoke Welsh. However, there were large discrepancies between age groups. 27.9% of 3-15 year olds spoke Welsh, 8.6% of 16-64 year olds spoke Welsh, and the lowest proportion was among the over 65s at 5.3%.

Primary and secondary education is available through the medium of Welsh, there are Welsh-language chapels, and the headquarters of Menter yr Iaith Pen-y-bont ar Ogwr is based in the town. The Welsh-language author and Welsh-medium education campaigner Norah Isaac was born and raised in Caerau. She was described as 'the most influential individual in the history of Welsh-medium education' by Iolo Wyn Williams in his book Our Children's Language: The Welsh-Medium Schools of Wales, 1939-2000. Wales' first ever Welsh-language nursery was opened in Maesteg in 1949.

== Education ==
Maesteg has six English language state primary schools: Cwmfelin, Plasnewydd, Caerau, Nantyffyllon, Llangynwyd and Garth. Plasnewydd is one of the biggest primary schools in the Llynfi Valley, with just over 400 pupils, and is an Eco-School. There is also a Catholic primary school, St. Mary's and St. Patrick's, and a Welsh-medium school, Ysgol Cynwyd Sant.

There are two comprehensive schools in Maesteg. The English-medium Ysgol Maesteg School, previously known as Maesteg Comprehensive School, recently moved to a new site, at a cost of £17,000,000. The Welsh-medium Ysgol Gyfun Gymraeg Llangynwyd then relocated to the former school's previous premises.

The pupils of St. Mary's and St. Patrick's pursue their secondary education in Archbishop McGrath Catholic Comprehensive School, located in Brackla, a few miles to the south.

== Healthcare ==
Maesteg Community Hospital is run by Cwm Taf Morgannwg University Health Board.

== Maesteg Town Council ==
Maesteg Town Council has seventeen representatives covering the four electoral wards of Maesteg East (5), Maesteg West (5), Nantyffyllon (3) and Caerau (4). Until recently, there had been a majority of Labour members for over forty years. Following mass resignations from the local Labour Party as a result of an internal row over candidate selections, several Councillors resigned from the party and now sit as independents. The make-up of the council as of June 2019 is 9 Labour and 8 Llynfi Independents members.

== Religion ==
The largest religion in the valley is Christianity; the majority of denominations are Nonconformist. There are many churches and chapels in the Maesteg area, several of which have been converted into flats because they are no longer used for religious purposes. There is a Kingdom Hall of Jehovah's Witnesses in one of Maesteg's villages, Nantyffyllon.

== Culture ==
Maesteg has a tradition of music and theatre, including a rich tradition of singing. At present, there are two male voice choirs – Cor Meibion Maesteg A'r Cylch (Maesteg and District Male Voice Choir) and Maesteg Gleemen Male Voice Choir. Regarding competitions and awards, Maesteg Gleemen is the most successful MVC in the Llynfi Valley and Bridgend County Borough Council area.

There is also a women's choir: Harmony Ladies Choir. There are two mixed groups, Noteworthy Choir and Take Note contemporary vocal group.

Maesteg Musical Theatre Society (previously Maesteg Amateur Operatic Society) is a multi-award winning society which performs a musical and concert every year in Maesteg.

Maesteg Children's Choir hosts many concerts throughout the year, and Curtain Up Youth Theatre has been performing musicals since the turn of the millennium.

The rock band Funeral for a Friend originates from Maesteg.

The Welsh national anthem "Hen Wlad Fy Nhadau" was first performed in Maesteg, in the vestry of the original Capel Tabor which is now Maesteg Workingmen's Club.

The artist Christopher Williams was born in Maesteg in 1873: seven of his paintings are on display in the town hall.

== Media ==
As part of Bridgend County Borough, the local commercial radio station is Bridge FM. Maesteg is also on the fringes of the broadcast area of the Swansea-based local commercial radio stations Hits Radio South Wales, its sister station Greatest Hits Radio South Wales and Swansea Bay Radio, as well as local Internet based station, Radio Maesteg. The town is also served by three local newspapers: The Glamorgan Gazette, published weekly, has its main office in Bridgend, but prints news related to Maesteg; The Gem, formerly The Recorder, a free weekly, printed in Cowbridge, and The Llynfi News, a free monthly paper, based in Maesteg.

== Sport ==
Maesteg is home to Maesteg Park A.F.C. an association football team founded in 1945 and affiliated to the Football Association of Wales. There are four Welsh Rugby Union teams in Maesteg. The oldest is Maesteg RFC, founded in 1877, while Maesteg Harlequins RFC was formed in the 1920s. Other rugby union teams from the area include Nantyffyllon RFC and Maesteg Celtic RFC. For a time, Maesteg was also home to the now-defunct rugby league team South Wales Scorpions.

The town is home to two cricket clubs. Maesteg Cricket Club was founded in 1846 and won the South Wales Cricket Association League Cup in 2016. Maesteg Celtic Cricket Club is based at Garth Welfare Park; they have won the Welsh Cup three times and the first division of the South Wales Cricket Association on seven occasions, including a record four times consecutively. Both clubs play in the South Wales Cricket Association Division 1.

== Notable people ==
See Category:People from Maesteg

- Billy Banks (1925-1991), Wales and Great Britain rugby league player
- Allan Bateman, Wales and British Lions rugby union and rugby league player
- Dave Bowen (1928–1995), Arsenal and Wales, footballer and football manager
- Henry Bracy (1846–1917), opera singer, director and producer
- Gwyn Evans, Wales and British Lions rugby union player
- Howell Evans (1928-2014), actor
- Chico Hopkins, Wales and British Lions rugby union and rugby league player
- Norah Isaac (1915-2003), author and pioneer of Welsh-language education
- George Jeffries (1889–1972), founder of the worldwide Elim Pentecostal Church
- Siân Lloyd (1958-), ITV weather presenter
- James Morgan (1985-), actor
- Sir Rhys Hopkin Morris (1888–1956), Liberal politician, stipendiary magistrate and first director of the Welsh Region BBC
- Sir William Beddoe Rees MP (1877–1931), Welsh chapel architect, town-planner and politician
- Brinley Richards (1904–1981), Archdruid of Wales 1972–75
- Menna Richards, Controller of BBC Wales, 2000–2011
- David Emlyn Thomas (1892–1954), politician and trade unionist
- Rees Thomas (1926-1984), rugby league player
- Thomas Llyfnwy Thomas (1912–1983), U.S.-based singer and TV personality
- Sidney Wilcox (1893–1973), cricketer
- Christopher Williams (1873–1934), painter
- John J. Williams (1948–2020), Wales and British Lions rugby union player and international athlete
